= Colby Donaldson =

American actor (born 1974)

- Born: April 1, 1974 (age 52)
- Occupations: Television personality, actor
- Known for: Survivor: The Australian Outback (runner-up); Survivor: All-Stars; Survivor: Heroes vs. Villains; Survivor 50: In the Hands of the Fans
- Spouse: Britt Bailey (m. 2016)

Colby Donaldson (born April 1, 1974) is an American television personality and actor. He finished as the runner-up on Survivor: The Australian Outback (2001). He then competed on three more Survivor seasons, Survivor: All-Stars (2004): Survivor: Heroes vs. Villains (2010), and Survivor 50: In the Hands of the Fans (2026). He has also hosted reality competition shows, such as Top Shot, Top Guns, The Butcher and Alone, all on the History network.

== Early life and education ==
Donaldson grew up in Christoval, Texas. He played high school football for and graduated in 1992 from Christoval High School. He earned a college degree in business marketing from Texas Tech University in 1996. Then he briefly worked as an HMO's sales representative and then became a self-employed car tuner in San Angelo. He moved his business to Dallas in late 2000.

Donaldson's father, an architect in San Angelo, and mother divorced a few years before Survivor.

== Survivor: The Australian Outback ==
Donaldson first appeared on Survivor: The Australian Outback (2001) as part of the Ogakor tribe, which was divided between two alliances: one led by bartender/actress Jerri Manthey, whose flirtations Donaldson grew weary of; and another including Keith Famie and Tina Wesson. His Texan flag was notoriously used as a rooftop for the tribe's camp.

After two Ogakor members were voted off, in the season's fourth Tribal Council (and Ogakor's third), Manthey's alliance voted against Famie, but Donaldson voted alongside Wesson's alliance against a member of Manthey's alliance and singer-songwriter Mitchell Olson, leading to the 3–3 tie and then the 2–2 retie. Votes cast in prior Councils weighed in to break the deadlock. Famie was not voted before, but Olson was voted once, leading to Olson's elimination.

When the Ogakor and Kucha tribes merged into the Barramundi tribe, ten overall contestants remained—five each of their own tribe. (Note: A Kucha member Michael Skupin was medically evacuated before the merger due to burn injuries from falling into a campfire after passing out.) Furthermore, the former Ogakor tribe was still divided between the two alliances. One of ex-Ogakor members Keith Famie won the season's first Individual Immunity challenge, (Note: In the season's first Individual Immunity challenge, ten remaining contestants stood on their own pillars at a river. After ten hours and eighteen hours passed, only Famie and Tina Wesson remained until she stepped down from the challenge, leading him to win the Individual Immunity necklace.) making ex-Kucha members unable to vote against Famie. In Barramundi's first Tribal Council, the ex-Ogakors, despite division among them, voted against an ex-Kucha member Jeff Varner, but ex-Kucha members, still unable to vote against Famie, voted against an ex-Ogakor member Colby Donaldson, leading to the 5–5 tie and then the 4–4 retie. To break the second tie, Varner was eliminated based on votes cast against him in prior Councils, while votes against Donaldson had never been cast previously.

The ex-Ogakors held majority advantage and voted out another ex-Kucha member. Then heavily disliked Manthey was voted off. Then eliminations of other remaining ex-Kucha members (Note: Before Jerri Manthey was voted off the tribe, the Ogakor alliance primarily targeted one of remaining ex-Kucha members Nick Brown. Brown won the Individual Immunity necklace from one challenge, making Brown immune from elimination until the next immunity challenge.) and another ex-Ogakor member Amber Brkich, who still aligned with Manthey post-merge, followed. When three players remained, Donaldson won the season's final immunity challenge, "Fallen Comrades", the quiz about eliminated contestants. This was his fifth consecutive individual immunity win, making him the first constestant in the history of the show to win five immunity challenges.

As the only player eligible to vote while possessing the Individual Immunity necklace, Donaldson voted off Famie, whom Donaldson found unworthy to be one of the final two, placing Famie third, and kept Wesson as promised. (Note: Keith Famie stated that, if he won the "Fallen Comrades" immunity challenge, he would have voted out Donaldson as a potential threat. Tina Wesson stated that, if she won the challenge, she would have voted out Famie and kept Donaldson as promised, figuring that Donaldson would be popular to viewers.)

In the Final Tribal Council, Donaldson and Wesson revealed onscreen to the jury their own core alliance that helped maintain the Ogakor tribe's strength. They both further revealed using and holding Famie as part of their voting strategy from Olson's elimination to the final three. Donaldson became the runner-up to winner Tina Wesson by the 3–4 jury vote. (Note: One of the three jurors who voted for Donaldson, Nick Brown, cited Donaldson's challenge winnings. Another who voted for Donaldson, Rodger Bingham, cited his "play[ing] the game a little bit harder".) For the runner-up placement, Donaldson earned $100,000 (equivalent to $182,000 in 2025). (Note: Tina Wesson stated that Donaldson "deserved to win" for his gameplay, that she felt more like a runner-up than a winner, and that the final result was "unfair".)

In 2001, Donaldson traded a maroon Pontiac Aztek, a different color from the yellow one seen in one of the season's reward challenges, for a two-year-old GMC Yukon Denali at a Pontiac/GMC dealership. Since then, he had used the Yukon Denali for four or five years.

== Post-Australian Outback appearances ==
After The Australian Outback, Donaldson appeared alongside other Survivor players in the May 8, 2001, episode of The Rosie O'Donnell Show and received from Rosie O'Donnell a Harley-Davidson motorcycle, one of his answers he made in The Australian Outback Final Tribal Council. (Note: By no later than August 2001, The Australian Outback winner Tina Wesson bought him another Harley-Davidson motorcycle as promised.) He was one of Australian Outback players appearing on Hollywood Squares on the week of May 14, 2001. He was a representative and spokesman for a Make-A-Wish Foundation fundraising event at its West Texas branch (Permian Basin) on May 16, 2002. He appeared in a Saltgrass Steak House commercial.

Donaldson moved from Dallas to Los Angeles in summer 2001 and then began taking acting lessons. He debuted his acting career in a television film Another Pretty Face, which first aired on PAX on November 8, 2002. In the film, his character has marital issues and is the son-in-law of its main character (Mel Harris), a middle-aged newscaster who is fired from a news station for being too old and then, after makeover and plastic surgery, poses as a younger woman for her new job in another news station.

Donaldson narrated an IMAX film Texas: The Big Picture, which premiered in the IMAX Theatre of the Bullock Texas State History Museum on May 3, 2003. He also appeared in televised Schick commercials by no later than early 2004.

== Survivor: All-Stars ==
Donaldson competed in Survivor: All-Stars (2004) as part of the original Mogo Mogo tribe. Mogo Mogo and Chapera absorbed the remaining members of the Saboga tribe, which dissolved after finishing last in a rowing challenge. Then Donaldson secretly arranged to oust the Borneo winner and another Mogo Mogo tribe member Richard Hatch, whom Donaldson perceived as a threat, making Hatch the fifth player eliminated. After asserting leadership for Mogo Mogo, Donaldson was eliminated by the 3–2 vote due to his potential threat status, despite his efforts to oust The Australian Outback returnee Jerri Manthey. (Note: The Australian Outback player Jerri Manthey appeared in All-Stars as a Saboga tribe member.) (Note: After the Chapera tribe won a tribal immunity challenge, Chapera selected one Mogo Mogo player Kathy Vavrick-O'Brien to temporarily join the Chapera until after Mogo Mogo's Tribal Council, which Kathy could not participate at the time.) At the reunion show, Donaldson was voted the sexiest Survivor male player.

== Post-All-Stars appearances ==
Donaldson portrayed himself in "The Survivor" (2004), an episode of American sitcom Curb Your Enthusiasm. In the episode, he is mistaken for a Holocaust survivor, and he and an actual Holocaust survivor argue at a dinner table over whose survival experience was tougher to endure than the other. He portrayed also a high school sweetheart of one of leading characters in the Good Girls Don't episode that aired on Oxygen on July 9, 2004, He portrayed a cop, unbeknownst to a main character Bridget (Kaley Cuoco) who entered a club with a fake ID card and became attracted to him there, in the 8 Simple Rules episode that aired on ABC on November 12, 2004. That same year, he portrayed a love interest of Brittany Hodges (Lauren Woodland) in The Young and the Restless and a dim actor and rival of Joey Tribbiani (Matt LeBlanc) in three episodes of Joey.

Donaldson was among People magazine's "50 Hottest Bachelors" of 2004. He was one of celebrity judges for Animal Planet's Nuts for Mutts, a contest for mixed-breed dogs, that same year.

Donaldson and Survivor host Jeff Probst made guest appearances on Mad TV in 2005. He and singer Gloria Gaynor hosted an episode of fourteen-part Animal Planet series The A-List (2007) covering survival of strong animals. Donaldson frequently appeared in talk show Rachael Ray. He hosted Speed's American Thunder in 2009 and appeared at a Make-A-Wish Foundation motorcycle-based fundraiser "Rumble to the Summit" on June 12–13, 2009.

== Other Survivor seasons ==
=== Heroes vs. Villains ===
Donaldson competed for the third time in Survivor: Heroes vs. Villains (2010) as part of the Heroes tribe, which early in the season lost its four members as result of losing four of five tribal immunity challenges. Donaldson's original alliance with Survivor: Palau contestants Tom Westman (Palau winner) and Stephenie Lagrossa was reduced to only him before he was accepted into the Heroes Alliance. With ten players remaining—five Heroes and five Villains—both tribes merged. Unfortunately, the remaining Heroes were systematically eliminated. (Note: Three votes against a Hero member J. T. Thomas, who gave a Hidden Immunity Idol to a Villain member Russell Hantz, were cast. Two Hidden Immunity Idols, including one given by J. T., were used by Parvati Shallow to nullify votes against returnees Jerri Manthey and Sandra Diaz-Twine of the Villain tribe, leading to Thomas's elimination.) Donaldson was the last Hero voted out, finishing in fifth place and as the eighth member of the jury.

=== Survivor 50: In the Hands of the Fans ===
Donaldson competed in Survivor 50: In the Hands of the Fans (2026) alongside his Heroes vs. Villains competitors—Stephenie LaGrossa Kendrick, Cirie Fields, and Benjamin "Coach" Wade—and All-Stars contestant Jenna Lewis-Dougherty. On day 4, Donaldson lost the Journey challenge to Survivor 49 winner Savannah Louie, leading to him losing his vote. Donaldson avoided going to tribal council during the pre merge. After the three tribes merged, the merged tribe was re-divided into three newer groups of five by a rock draw for a reward/immunity challenge. The newer post-merge teal group voted out Donaldson, who lost the challenge, at the series's very first three-Tribal Council night called the Blood Moon. As Fields asserted, he was in charge of the alliance on the other side. He finished fifteenth and narrowly missed out the jury.

== Other post-Survivor appearances ==
Donaldson hosted reality competition series Top Shot (2010–2013), The Butcher (2019), and Mountain Men: Ultimate Marksman (2022–), all on the History network. He was one of three celebrity judges for the fifth annual Pennzoil Victory Burnout Challenge, part of the 2012 NASCAR Sprint All-Star Race.

== Personal life ==
In 2016, Donaldson married long-time girlfriend Britt Bailey. Donaldson and his wife reside in Austin, Texas.

Donaldson inspired Survivor: Caramoan contestant Sherri Biethman to name her son after him. It is estimated that over 2,000 babies were given the name Colby in 2001 because of Donaldson's popularity.

== Filmography ==
Main source: The Dallas Morning News (2004)

=== Television ===
Year	Title	Role	Notes
2001	Survivor: The Australian Outback	Contestant	Runner-up
2001	Hollywood Squares	Panelist	2 episodes
2001	Politically Incorrect	Self	1 episode
2002	Just Shoot Me!	Tad	"Halloween? Halloween!"
2002	Reba	Trent	"Ring-a-Ding" (2002)
2004	Survivor: All-Stars	Contestant	Eliminated; 12th place
2004	Curb Your Enthusiasm	Himself	"The Survivor" (Season 4, episode 9)
2004	Good Girls Don't	Chuck	1 episode
2004	The Young and the Restless	Jason	1 episode
2004	8 Simple Rules	Shawn	"Secrets"
2004	JAG	Navy Lt. Brendan Slattery	"One Big Boat"
2005	Joey	Gunnar	3 episodes
2005	Mad TV	Himself	Season 10, Episode 15
2005	Rodney	Walter	1 episode
2005	Las Vegas	Trey Cooper	"Whatever Happened to Seymour Magoon?"
2005	The Contender	Self	1 episode
2006	Bones	Dr. Graham Legiere	"The Man in the Morgue"
2006	Pepper Dennis	Sleazy Man	1 episode
2007–2010	Rachael Ray	Self	34 episodes
2010	Survivor: Heroes vs. Villains	Contestant	Eliminated; 5th place
2010–2013	Top Shot	Host	5 Seasons/61 episodes
2012	Top Guns	Host	10 episodes
2013	Spartan Race	Host	
2019	The Butcher	Host	6 episodes
2021	Alone	Host	Season 7/11 episodes
2022	Mountain Men: Ultimate Marksman	Host	Season 1/8 episodes
2026	Survivor 50: In the Hands of the Fans	Contestant	Eliminated; 15th place

=== Movies ===
Year	Title	Role	Notes
2002	Another Pretty Face	Pete Deco	Alternative title: Time and Again
2003	Texas: The Big Picture	Narrator	IMAX Film
2005	Red Eye	Keefe's head bodyguard	
2005	Dirty Love	Mike	

== Notes ==
Preceded by Kelly Wiglesworth	Runner-Up of Survivor; Survivor: The Australian Outback	Succeeded by Kim Johnson
