= Jennifer Lyon =

American actress and TV personality

- Born: Jennifer Jane Lyon; February 27, 1972; Boulder City, Nevada, U.S.
- Died: January 19, 2010 (aged 37); Sublimity, Oregon, U.S.
- Television: Survivor: Palau

Jennifer Jane Lyon (February 27, 1972 – January 19, 2010) was an American actress and television personality best known for her appearance on Survivor: Palau.

== Early life ==
Jennifer Lyon was born in Nevada, but grew up in Washington and The Dalles, Oregon. She enjoyed hiking, playing soccer, and photography. At the age of 18, Jennifer learned Spanish when she participated in the foreign exchange program around 1990. After graduating from high school, Jennifer spent a year in Spain and two years in London working as a nanny. When Jennifer returned to the U.S., she attended Portland State University and spent a year there until she later attended Western Oregon State College before she was sent to Oregon State University. She later received a Bachelor of Science Degree in nutrition and food management.

== Survivor ==
In 2004, Lyon was selected for Survivor: Palau, the tenth overall season of Survivor. The season aired in Spring 2005. The game started with all 20 players on the same beach. During the tribe division, she was chosen by Gregg Carey to be on the Koror tribe. She in turn picked Coby Archa to join the tribe. Koror ended up being the dominant tribe, winning every tribal immunity challenge. During this time she developed a showmance with Carey. She also developed a rivalry with Ulong member Stephenie LaGrossa, who was constantly beating her in challenges. Eventually, LaGrossa, the last remaining Ulong, was absorbed into Koror, but Lyon outlasted her when LaGrossa was voted out in seventh place. At the Final Four, when Lyon was expected to be voted out, she convinced Tom Westman to vote for Ian Rosenberger for thinking about betraying their alliance, while Rosenberger and Katie Gallagher, the only other players left, voted for Lyon. A re-vote was unsuccessful in breaking the tie, so Lyon was put in the first ever Final Four fire making tie-breaker challenge against Rosenberger. She lost the challenge, which caused her to be the 17th person eliminated from Survivor: Palau, putting her on the jury, ultimately placing fourth in the competition. At the Final Tribal Council, she gave her vote to Westman to win the game.

At the reunion show, it was revealed that her relationship with Carey only lasted on the island, although they remained friends afterwards.

== Death ==
In 2005, while living in Encino, California, Lyon was diagnosed with stage three breast cancer, and subsequently began blogging about her disease and treatment. Lyon got involved with the Me and My Two Friends Foundation, which focuses on the early detection and prevention of breast cancer through education and awareness. It was founded by Alisa Unger, who designed jewelry and planned to donate a portion of the proceeds to fund breast cancer education projects. In 2006, Lyon was the grand marshal for the 11th annual Walk for the Cause, a breast cancer fundraiser in Albany, Oregon. In December 2009, Lyon opened a Christmas tree lot with her boyfriend, Dion, mother and father, Larry and Jane Lyon, and her two nephews, Tyler Lyon and Mikel Lyon, and donated all the profits to the Susan Love Cancer Research Foundation. In January she moved to a spot on the Hood River in Oregon.

On January 19, 2010, Lyon died from cancer, which had come back from remission and had metastasized to the bone. She became the first former Survivor contestant to die. The special Surviving Survivor, which aired Thursday, February 4, 2010, just over two weeks after her death, was dedicated to her memory. The reunion episode of Survivor: Heroes vs. Villains showed a video montage of moments from Lyon's appearance on Survivor: Palau.

== Filmography ==
Year	Title	Role	Notes
2005	Survivor: Palau	Contestant	Eliminated; 4th place
2007	Daddy Day Camp	Mrs. Simmons	
2008	Long Pig	Miranda	
