= Tom Westman =

American firefighter (born 1964)

- Born: Thomas Westman; January 4, 1964 (age 62); Sayville, New York, U.S.
- Television: Survivor: Palau (winner); Survivor: Heroes vs. Villains
- Spouse: Bernadette Westman
- Children: 3

Thomas Westman (born January 4, 1964) is an American firefighter and television personality best known as the winner of the tenth season of the American reality show Survivor, Survivor: Palau.

== Survivor ==
=== Palau ===
At the beginning of the game, Westman was not immediately targeted. It was revealed later in the show that when the game began with all 20 castaways on the same island, Westman was in an early alliance with Ian Rosenberger, Katie Gallagher and Stephenie LaGrossa. However, when it came time to pick tribes, LaGrossa ended up on Ulong, whereas Westman, Rosenberger, and Gallagher all ended up on Koror. This three-way alliance stayed strong on Koror. Originally planning to hide behind the younger males of his tribe, Westman soon became known for leadership skills. Koror won every single tribal immunity challenge; but in Episode Five, both tribes faced Tribal Council regardless of the challenge outcome, and Westman joined the rest of his tribe to vote out Willard Smith.

As Ulong's numbers dwindled until only LaGrossa remained, she joined Koror in Episode Nine in an unofficial merge. Together with LaGrossa, Westman's alliance controlled the game and voted out Coby Archa. At the Final Eight, Westman's allies Gregg Carey and Jennifer Lyon decided to vote out LaGrossa, despite Westman's campaigning for her. But Janu Tornell unexpectedly quit the game at Tribal Council after LaGrossa broke down once. At the next Tribal Council, LaGrossa tried to organize an alliance of women against Westman, but Caryn Groedel would not commit and informed him of the plan, leading to LaGrossa being unanimously voted out.

At the Final Three, heavy arguments took place, especially between Rosenberger and Westman. Rosenberger felt as if he had betrayed his friends, and protested that he did not come to play the role of the villain. In the endurance immunity challenge, after close to 12 hours, Rosenberger agreed to step down and be voted off in a sign of repentance for betraying Westman and Gallagher. Westman accepted and Rosenberger was voted out. This immunity win was Westman's fifth out of only seven individual immunity challenges, matching the record for individual immunity wins set by Colby Donaldson (Survivor: The Australian Outback), and since matched only by Terry Deitz (Survivor: Panama), Ozzy Lusth (Survivor: Cook Islands), Mike Holloway (Survivor: Worlds Apart), and Brad Culpepper (Survivor: Game Changers).

In the end, Westman defeated Gallagher in a 6–1 vote to become the Sole Survivor. He managed to gain the votes of everyone on the jury except Archa.

=== Heroes vs. Villains ===
In Survivor: Heroes vs. Villains, the series's twentieth season, Westman was cast into the Heroes tribe. At the beginning of the game, he made an alliance with Colby Donaldson and fellow Palau contestant Stephenie LaGrossa. The tribe beat the Villains at the first reward challenge, but lost at immunity. On Day Three, Westman and the rest of the tribe voted out Jessica "Sugar" Kiper. After going to Tribal Council a second time, he was one of only three people who attempted to vote out Amanda Kimmel. Before voting, Heroes member James Clement (Survivor: China and Survivor: Micronesia) verbally attacked LaGrossa over her performance at the immunity challenge and her alliance with Westman. (Note: Leslie Snyder of The Dallas Morning News attributed James Clement's inability "to listen to" J.T. Thomas (Survivor: Tocantins) to the Heroes' loss at the second tribal immunity challenge. Snyder noted Clement's willingness to, on the contrary, still hold Stephenie LaGrossa responsible.) Westman and Donaldson defended LaGrossa, who then became the second contestant eliminated.

Westman later found the hidden immunity idol at the Heroes campsite and thus got a target on his back. At the fourth Tribal Council (third for the Heroes), he played the idol which negated three votes cast against him, sending Cirie Fields home instead. After James Clement had injured his leg at the following reward challenge, Westman attempted to ensure the elimination of Clement. After losing their fourth immunity challenge, Westman attempted to vote out Clement, but the Heroes tribe elected to keep Clement over Westman, and he was voted out 5–2.

=== Reception ===
Westman was labeled in 2005 by the TV Guide magazine one of the "Sexiest Men" on television. In 2011, he was officially inducted into the Xfinity "Survivor Hall of Fame," alongside Cook Islands castaway Ozzy Lusth and Panama contestant Cirie Fields.

In a 2015 Parade magazine article, host Jeff Probst named Westman one of his top ten all-time favorite Survivor winners and one of his top six all-time favorite male winners.

== Filmography ==
=== Television ===
Year	Title	Role	Notes
2005	Survivor: Palau	Contestant	Winner
2010	Survivor: Heroes vs. Villains	Contestant	Eliminated; 16th place

== Personal life ==
A New York City firefighter for twenty years, Westman retired from Ladder Company 108 in 2005 and then became an executive for the Hartford Financial Services Group (Manhattan). He put the money he won towards his motivational speaking and charity. He has three children, including a deaf daughter.

== Notes ==
Preceded by Chris Daugherty	Winner of Survivor; Survivor: Palau	Succeeded by Danni Boatwright
