= Survivor: Palau =

- Season 10
- Region 1 DVD cover
- Presented by: Jeff Probst
- No. of days: 39
- No. of castaways: 20
- Winner: Tom Westman
- Runner-up: Katie Gallagher
- Location: Koror, Palau
- No. of episodes: 15

Release
- Original network: CBS
- Original release: February 17 – May 15, 2005

Additional information
- Filming dates: November 1 – December 9, 2004

Season chronology
- ← Previous; Vanuatu — Islands of Fire Next → Guatemala — The Maya Empire

Survivor: Palau is the tenth season of the American CBS competitive reality television series Survivor. The season filmed from November 1, 2004, through December 9, 2004, and premiered on February 17, 2005. Filming took place in Koror, Palau. Hosted by Jeff Probst, it consisted of the usual 39 days of gameplay with 20 competitors, the most the series had ever begun with up to that point.

Fire lieutenant Tom Westman defeated advertising executive Katie Gallagher in a 6–1 jury vote to become the Sole Survivor.

== Format ==
Survivor is a reality television show created by Mark Burnett and Charlie Parsons and based on the Swedish show Expedition Robinson. The series follows a number of participants who are isolated in a remote location, where they must provide food, fire, and shelter for themselves. Every three days, one participant is removed from the series by majority vote, with challenges being held to give a reward (ranging from living and food-related prizes to a car) and immunity from being voted off the show. The last remaining player is awarded a prize of $1,000,000.

== Contestants ==
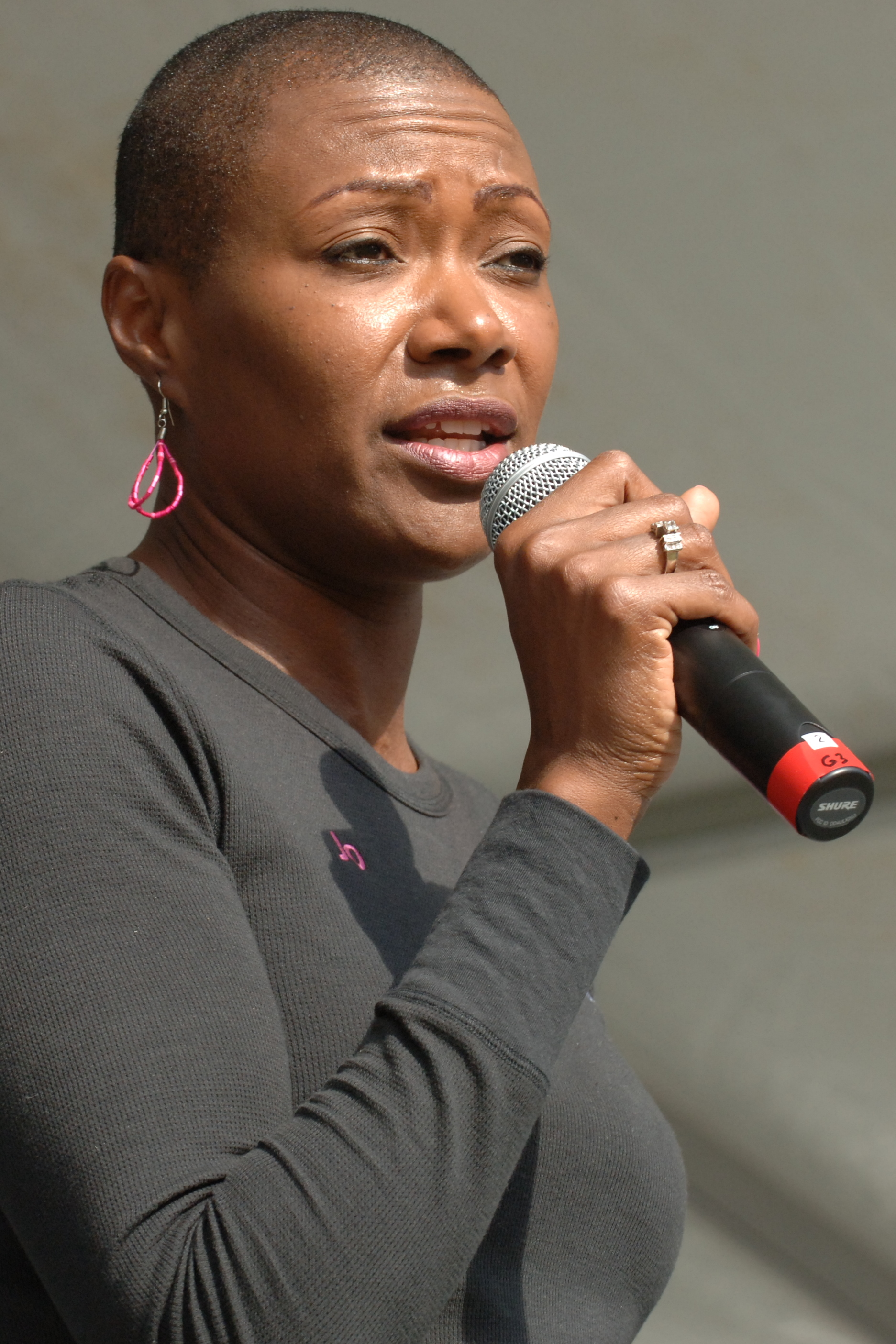
Jolanda Jones

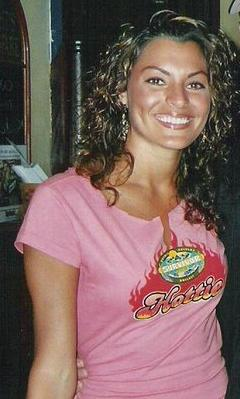
Stephenie LaGrossa

The two tribes were named Ulong (named after Ulong Island, one of Palau's tourist spots) and Koror (named after the capital city of Palau at the time). This was the first (and only) season in Survivor history not to have a merged tribe.

Notable contestants include Miss USA 2002 competitor and Miss Ohio USA 2002 Kim Mullen, Actress Jennifer Lyon, and eventual Texas House of Representatives member, Jolanda Jones.

List of Survivor: Palau contestants
| Contestant | Age | From | Tribe | | Finish | |
| Contestant | Age | From | Original | Absorbed | Placement | Day |
|---|---|---|---|---|---|---|
| Jonathan Libby | 23 | Dallas, Texas | None (Note: Jonathan and Wanda were not selected for either tribe, and were thus eliminated immediately.) | | Eliminated | Day 2 |
| Wanda Shirk | 55 | Ulysses, Pennsylvania | None | | Eliminated | Day 2 |
| Jolanda Jones | 38 | Houston, Texas | Ulong | | 1st voted out | Day 3 |
| Ashlee Ashby | 22 | Easley, South Carolina | Ulong | | 2nd voted out | Day 6 |
| Jeff Wilson | 21 | Ventura, California | Ulong | | 3rd voted out | Day 8 |
| Kim Mullen | 25 | Huber Heights, Ohio | Ulong | | 4th voted out | Day 11 |
| Willard Smith | 56 | Bellevue, Washington | Koror | | 5th voted out | Day 12 |
| Angie Jakusz | 24 | New Orleans, Louisiana | Ulong | | 6th voted out | Day 12 |
| James Miller | 33 | Mobile, Alabama | Ulong | | 7th voted out | Day 15 |
| Ibrehem Rahman | 27 | Birmingham, Alabama | Ulong | | 8th voted out | Day 18 |
| Bobby Jon Drinkard | 27 | Troy, Alabama | Ulong | | Eliminated (Note: Due to the Ulong tribe going to Tribal Council with only two players remaining, there was no vote. Instead, Bobby Jon and Stephenie competed in a fire-making challenge, which Bobby Jon lost.) | Day 21 |
| Coby Archa | 32 | Athens, Texas | Koror | Koror | 9th voted out 1st jury member | Day 24 |
| Janu Tornell | 39 | Las Vegas, Nevada | Koror | Koror | Quit; 2nd jury member | Day 27 |
| Stephenie LaGrossa | 24 | Toms River, New Jersey | Ulong | Koror | 10th voted out 3rd jury member | Day 30 |
| Gregg Carey | 27 | Chicago, Illinois | Koror | Koror | 11th voted out 4th jury member | Day 33 |
| Caryn Groedel | 46 | Solon, Ohio | Koror | Koror | 12th voted out 5th jury member | Day 36 |
| Jenn Lyon | 32 | Encino, California | Koror | Koror | Eliminated; 6th jury member | Day 37 |
| Ian Rosenberger | 23 | Ambridge, Pennsylvania | Koror | Koror | 14th voted out 7th jury member | Day 38 |
| Katie Gallagher | 29 | Merced, California | Koror | Koror | Runner-up | Day 39 |
| Tom Westman | 40 | Sayville, New York | Koror | Koror | Sole Survivor | Day 39 |

=== Future appearances ===
Bobby Jon Drinkard and Stephenie LaGrossa competed again in Survivor: Guatemala. LaGrossa and Tom Westman competed in Survivor: Heroes vs. Villains on the Heroes tribe. LaGrossa also competed on Survivor 50: In the Hands of the Fans.

Outside of Survivor, LaGrossa competed on the USA Network reality competition series Snake in the Grass. LaGrossa also competed on the first season of the Peacock reality TV series The Traitors.

== Season summary ==
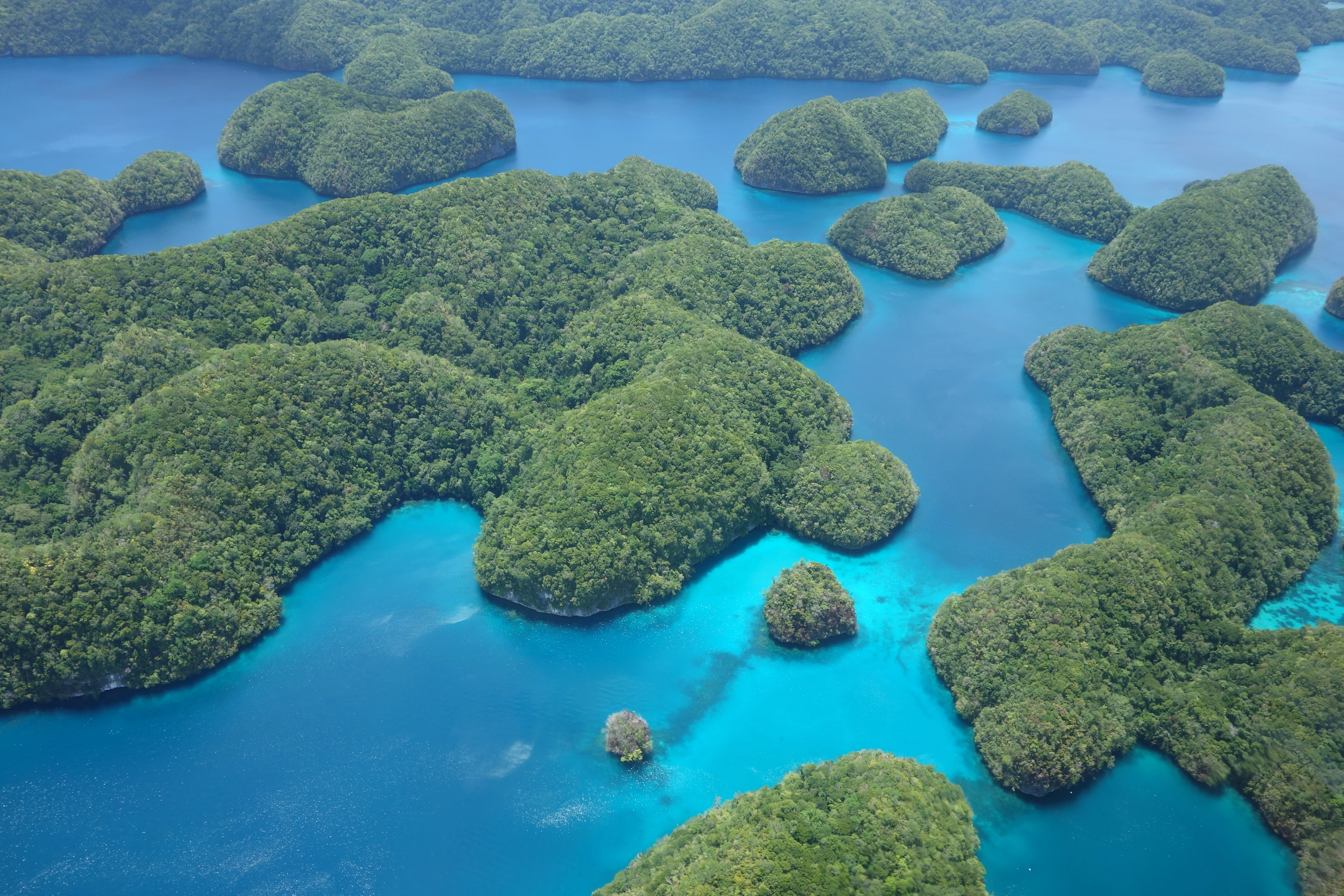
The season was filmed on the island of Koror in Palau.

The twenty players began the game by rowing a boat to shore, with the first player of each gender to reach shore to win immunity. The next day, Jeff Probst announced that they would now pick tribes via a schoolyard pick, with those who had won immunity getting first pick. In addition, the last male and female remaining would immediately leave the game. The two tribes, Koror and Ulong, then participated in the first reward/immunity challenge, with the winner, Koror, deciding to leave their present beach to another one they had not seen.

As the challenges continued, it quickly became apparent that Ulong was the weaker tribe, while strong leadership by Tom and Ian at Koror kept the tribe intact. Ulong would win no immunity challenges and few reward challenges, and Koror's only visit to tribal council was the result of a double-elimination twist. Stephenie and Bobby Jon, the last two members of Ulong, lost the final tribal immunity challenge. Since they were unable to vote, the two faced off in a fire-making challenge with Stephenie emerging victorious. After spending the night alone, she was instructed to travel to Koror, and was absorbed into their tribe.

Koror developed a core group of five – Tom, Ian, Gregg, Jenn, and Katie – and those on the outside saw them as a threat but were unable to break them. Despite making an immediate strong impression on her new tribe, Stephenie was quickly identified as a target due to her strength and for being the outsider. In a twist that would eventually lead to its use in later seasons, one individual immunity challenge required the first player to drop out to spend a night alone on an isolated island. Janu was exiled and found the experience liberating, choosing to quit the game at the next tribal council, effectively sparing Stephenie from being voted out. However, her safety would not last and Stephenie was subsequently voted out.

With six players remaining, Tom and Ian decided to spare Caryn, the last remaining outsider, instead plotting with her to eliminate Gregg for potentially strengthening a bond with Katie after going on a reward together. Despite voting Gregg out, Katie felt betrayed by Ian, and her feelings worsened when Ian took Tom with him on a reward instead of her as he had promised. Ian attempted to make amends but Katie still held harsh feelings towards him. After disposing of Caryn, the final four players opted to allow the next vote to end in a tie between Jenn and Ian, and Ian won the subsequent fire-making challenge.

The final immunity challenge required players to stand on buoys for as long as possible; Katie dropped out early, but both Tom and Ian remained for nearly 12 hours. Ian opted to quit the challenge, conceding immunity to Tom, after Tom played on his remorse for hurting Katie's feelings and breaking his promises to her. Forgoing the usual tribal council, Tom voted Ian out of the game on the spot. At the final tribal council, Tom's leadership and physical ability against Katie's less dominant gameplay led the jury to award Tom the title of Sole Survivor by a vote of 6–1.

Challenge winners and eliminations by episode
| Episode | | | Challenge winner(s) | | Eliminated | |
| No. | Title | Original air date | Reward | Immunity | Tribe | Player |
|---|---|---|---|---|---|---|
| 1 | "This Has Never Happened Before!" | February 17, 2005 | None | Ian (Note: Ian and Jolanda were the first man and woman, respectively, to arrive at the beach on Day 1, and thus earned the right of first pick for the tribe selection on Day 2, which meant they could not be eliminated that day.) | None | Jonathan |
| 1 | "This Has Never Happened Before!" | February 17, 2005 | None | Jolanda | None | Wanda |
| 1 | "This Has Never Happened Before!" | February 17, 2005 | Koror | | Ulong | Jolanda |
| 2 | "Love is in the Air, Rats Are Everywhere" | February 24, 2005 | Ulong | Koror | Ulong | Ashlee |
| 3 | "Dangerous Creatures and Horrible Setbacks" | March 3, 2005 | Ulong | Koror | Ulong | Jeff |
| 4 | "Sumo at Sea" | March 10, 2005 | Koror | Koror | Ulong | Kim |
| 5 | "The Best and Worst Reward Ever" | March 16, 2005 | Koror | | Koror | Willard |
| 5 | "The Best and Worst Reward Ever" | March 16, 2005 | Koror | Ibrehem (Note: The Koror tribe was instructed to vote for one of the Ulong members to earn immunity from that night's vote; they selected Ibrehem.) | Ulong | Angie |
| 6 | "Jellyfish 'N Chips" | March 23, 2005 | Ulong | Koror | Ulong | James |
| 7 | "The Great White Shark Hunter" | March 31, 2005 | Koror | Koror | Ulong | Ibrehem |
| 8 | "Neanderthal Man" | April 7, 2005 | Koror | Koror | Ulong | Bobby Jon |
| 9 | "I Will Not Give Up" | April 14, 2005 | None (Note: There was no reward challenge due to Stephenie joining the Koror tribe.) | Tom | Koror | Coby |
| 10 | "Exile Island" | April 21, 2005 | Caryn, Gregg, Janu, Tom | Tom | Koror | Janu |
| 11 | "I'll Show You How Threatening I Am" | April 28, 2005 | Survivor Auction | Ian | Koror | Stephenie |
| 12 | "We'll Make You Pay" | May 5, 2005 | Gregg [Jenn, Katie] | Ian | Koror | Gregg |
| 13 | "It Could All Backfire" | May 12, 2005 | Ian [Tom] | Tom | Koror | Caryn |
| 14 | "The Ultimate Shock" | May 15, 2005 | None | Tom | Koror | Jenn |
| 14 | "The Ultimate Shock" | May 15, 2005 | None | Tom | Koror | Ian |
| 15 | "The Reunion" | May 15, 2005 | | | | |

In the case of multiple tribes or castaways who win reward or immunity, they are listed in order of finish, or alphabetically where it was a team effort; where one castaway won and invited others, the invitees are in brackets.

== Episodes ==
| No. overall | No. in season | Title | CBS recap | Original release date | U.S. viewers (millions) | Rating/share (18–49) |
|---|---|---|---|---|---|---|
| 138 | 1 | "This Has Never Happened Before!" | Recap | February 10, 2005 | 23.66 | 9.1/23 |
As the twenty castaways paddled to shore, host Jeff Probst started the game by announcing an impromptu individual immunity challenge.: Individual immunity challenge: The newly marooned castaways must jump off their boat, swim across the sea and reach the drop-off beach where two individual immunity necklaces, one for each gender, are waiting.; Though shocked by the twist as they were not divided into tribes yet, the castaways raced to the shoreline. Jonathan and Stephenie jumped off the boat and tried to outswim it, but the boat went far ahead of them. In the end, Ian and Jolanda each won individual immunity. The next day, Jeff Probst informed the castaways that Ian and Jolanda, as winners of the Immunity necklaces, would initiate the schoolyard-style tribe selection process, and that one man and one woman would not be chosen for tribes, and be automatically eliminated. Jonathan and Wanda were not selected. Therefore, they were forced to leave the game for good. After they left, the two tribes were given their buffs: Ian's tribe, Koror, was given brown, and Jolanda's tribe, Ulong, was given blue.: Reward/Immunity challenge: Castaways will be on an obstacle course involving a jungle race, a cargo net crawl and a tire run. The tribe members would then arrive at a supply dump, where they would gather valuable supplies. The tribes would choose which items they want to race with. The next obstacle was a 10-foot (3.0 m) wall that the Survivors would need to get themselves and their supplies over. They would then wade through a waist-deep swamp before dropping the supplies on beach mats. The final leg would be an outrigger race on the water to retrieve their tribe flag. The first tribe to cross the finish line with their tribe flag wins all supplies they chose from the supply dump as well as Immunity; In the first immunity challenge, the younger Ulong struggled as Jolanda insisted to take everything in the supply dump, leaving the elderly Koror, who only took the flint, with the lead and the eventual challenge win. Koror was also given the chance to stay into their old camp or to start fresh; they chose a new one, leaving the old camp solely to Ulong. Though having won the flint as well as Immunity, Koror had a mishap as their outrigger capsized and their newly acquired crate full of fire-making essentials sank in deep water. While in Ulong, Jolanda and Angie were to blame for the loss (Angie deemed as a weak link and Jolanda insisting to take all the supplies). But in the end, despite being a strong competitor, Jolanda's overly domineering attitude sealed her fate.
| 139 | 2 | "Love is in the Air, Rats Are Everywhere" | Recap | February 17, 2005 | 21.64 | 7.9/20 |
Now living at their new campsite, Koror's new home proved terrible when they learned that their camp is infested with rats. To make things worse, their flint is still underwater after their boat capsized while paddling to their new beach.: Reward challenge: Castaways were to run through a "gauntlet" bridge, requiring them to cross several floating obstacles over water in order to collect flags on the other side. As they were crossing, two opposing tribe members would be hurling swinging bags of sand at them all the while. If knocked off, the player would be forced to go back to the beginning. The first tribe to collect all 10 of their flags wins fishing spear, and a snorkeling set; if Ulong wins, they will receive flint.; Angie from Ulong still felt isolated after deemed as a weak link from last challenge but quickly gained the respect of her teammates by singlehandedly winning the reward challenge for Ulong. While Ulong chowed down a handful of fish, Koror had to get the hard-earned flint that was still lying underwater. Despite the angry tides, Ian became victorious as he brought the flint back at camp. In both camps, romances emerged at Koror (Jenn and Gregg) and Ulong (Kim and Jeff Wilson).: Immunity challenge: Two heavy foot lockers, filled with mess kits, were resting on the ocean floor. Each tribe must swim out to a marker buoy, dive down, find a rope attached to the foot locker, then pull it 50 feet (15 m) across the ocean floor. Once the foot locker reaches the start point, the tribes must unlatch the lockers, thus releasing the mess kits. Each tribe member would retrieve one mess kit, then swim back to the beach. Each mess kit had a Morse code letter inscribed on it. The first tribe to decipher the Morse code and spell out the mystery word ("immunity") wins Immunity.; During the immunity challenge, Kim performed very badly and it seemed that she was throwing the challenge, while Koror's "buddy system" brought them to another Immunity win. Facing another Tribal Council, Ulong discussed voting out Ashlee, who had a questionable desire to stay and was plagued with sickness, while Kim's laziness as well as her weak performance in challenges also put her on the chopping block. But in the end, ailing Ashlee paid the price and was voted out.
| 140 | 3 | "Dangerous Creatures and Horrible Setbacks" | Recap | February 24, 2005 | 21.80 | 8.5/ |
At Ulong, James became suspicious of Jeff Wilson and Kim's undeniable closeness and saw it as distraction, especially when Ulong needed to win immunity. Meanwhile, the still complete Koror started to get tired of each other, as Caryn and Katie bickered when they repair their shelter.: Reward challenge: Members from each tribe would race into the water to retrieve a safety ring. The first tribe member to fight off the opposition and swim the ring to their designated buoy would get a point. The battles would be one-on-one as well as two-on-two. The first tribe to score three wins a sewing kit.; At the reward challenge, Ulong defeated Koror in another reward challenge blow-out. In an attempt to feed their hungry teammates, Ian and Tom killed a snake and tried to use its blood as bait for sharks, but failed. At Ulong, Jeff Wilson twisted his ankle when he accidentally stepped into a stray coconut.: Immunity challenge: The tribes would partake in a beach run, clipped to each other by a rope and carrying backpacks with 20 pounds of sandbag weight. The tribes would begin at opposite sides of an oval course. After Jeff Probst's go-signal, the tribes would race to catch up to one another. Any tribe members who fell behind could unclip from the rope and drop out of the race, but they would be forced to pass their sandbag to another player, who must carry the extra weight. The first tribe to catch up to the other tribe and tag them would gain Immunity. A variation on this challenge was used in Survivor: Cook Islands and Survivor: Caramoan.; At the immunity challenge, Jeff Wilson's injured ankle was too much to bear as he bailed himself out from the challenge. Koror won Immunity again, and Ulong faced their third successive Tribal Council. Jeff Wilson confessed that his ankle was too much torture for him and asked his team to vote him out, despite Bobby Jon and James' insistence that they oust lazy Kim. At Tribal Council, the others decided to grant Jeff Wilson's wish to leave the competition.
| 141 | 4 | "Sumo at Sea" | Recap | March 3, 2005 | 21.80 | 8.1/22 |
Ulong returned to camp from Tribal Council, with Stephenie's spirits going an all-time low and James angry and sarcastic about losing immunity challenges.: Reward challenge: Tribes will be given a crate full of tools (courtesy of Home Depot) and will be tasked to create a bathroom for their camp. Host Jeff Probst and Survivor production designer Jesse will then judge both bathrooms. The tribe that has the better bathroom wins a new shelter, picnic table and a patio.; For the reward challenge, the tribes were instructed to elect a leader. Koror chose Ian to be the leader of the project, and Ulong chose steelworker James. When both projects were judged, it was Koror who won a deluxe shelter, further frustrating James.: Immunity challenge: Tribes would face off in a series of one-on-one sumo-style battles. The Survivors would use padded duffel bags to knock their adversaries out of a ring and into the sea. The first tribe to win six bouts would take Immunity.; In the immunity challenge, Koror had an early lead, but Ulong made a slight comeback. However, in the final winner-takes-all round, James was defeated by Coby, thus giving Koror another victory. With another Tribal Council coming, Kim was still perceived as a weak link as well as lazy at camp, but she tried to shake things up when she tried to pull the other Ulong girls to an alliance. In the end, though worried of gender imbalance afterwards, Angie and Stephenie joined the guys in voting out Kim.
| 142 | 5 | "The Best and Worst Reward Ever" | Recap | March 10, 2005 | 18.42 | 6.9/19 |
After another Tribal Council, things got worse for Ulong as they got lost in the dark on their way back to camp. While having not to visit Tribal Council for winning all the immunity challenges, Gregg and Tom complained about Willard's poor work ethic and how he seemed to enjoy having a "free ride" as his tribe continue to win challenges while he sat out most of the time. Before introducing the reward challenge, Jeff Probst announced that both tribes would go to Tribal Council to vote someone out.: Reward challenge: The tribes will race to salvage sake bottles from a shipwreck. One player at a time would be pulled to the shipwreck on a raft by their tribemates. Once the player arrived, they must dive down to retrieve a sake bottle. The first tribe to bring back six bottles wins beef stew and root beer, but to be eaten while watching the losing team's Tribal Council. However, one member will be voted out from the winning tribe before the reward is distributed.; Though Ulong had an early lead, Ibrehem had difficulty in swimming, thus giving another win for Koror. At Koror, the alliance of Tom, Ian, Gregg, Jenn, and Katie targeted Willard as Tom thought that Willard would take one of the spots at the Final Tribal Council, but Coby and Willard wanted to vote out Katie. Later that day, Gregg approached Coby about joining forces with Janu and Jenn to eventually blindside Tom and Ian, which Coby agreed to. Later at Koror's first Tribal Council, Willard was perceived as weak and a freeloader and was voted out unanimously. While watching Ulong's fifth straight Tribal Council, it was revealed that Koror will vote again, this time to give immunity to one of the Ulong. Knowing Ibrehem was Ulong's worst performer in the reward challenge, Koror granted Ibrehem individual immunity in a 3–2–2–1 vote (with Bobby Jon and Stephenie both have 2 votes and Angie with 1). Ulong's vote was originally a tie as Angie and Stephenie voted against Bobby Jon, Bobby Jon and James voted against Angie, and Ibrehem against James, causing a revote. In the end, Ibrehem and Stephenie changed their votes to Angie and she was voted out unanimously. She left in good spirits, saying she was glad she was not the first person voted out.
| 143 | 6 | "Jellyfish 'N Chips" | Recap | March 17, 2005 | 19.15 | 7.3/19 |
At Ulong, everyone was upset about Ibrehem being voted by Koror for Immunity last Tribal Council. At Koror, things were lively as the yet-impenetrable team had to do some chores around camp.: Reward challenge: Using an old authentic machine gun, tribe members would take turns shooting tribe-colored tiles. The first tribe to take out eight of their targets would win an excursion to a stinger-free jellyfish lake with a feast of Pringles and Mai Tai.; In a closely fought reward challenge, both teams seized seven targets, but, after Stephenie shot the eighth for Ulong, Caryn was unable to tie the score for Koror, giving Ulong the victory. Back at Koror, Janu's severe shivering annoyed some tribe members, particularly Tom.: Immunity challenge: Tribes will be given wood and rope and 20 minutes to construct an impenetrable fortress to protect the already-bound foot locker. After 20 minutes, the tribes would race to break into the fortress constructed by the opposing tribe and rescue their flag. The first tribe to capture their flag and hoist it up a flagpole wins Immunity.; At the immunity challenge, Ulong again took the lead, but Koror's Janu worked through her fragile state and managed to give her tribe another Immunity win. With their sixth successive Tribal Council looming, Bobby Jon and Stephenie made an alliance and pointed out James's strength was weakening and Ibrehem was weak all throughout and his anomalous Immunity last Tribal Council. Despite their alliance, Bobby Jon and Stephenie cast separate votes: Bobby Jon and Ibrehem voted against James, and Stephenie and James voted against Ibrehem. In a revote, Stephenie changed her vote to James, sending him home.
| 144 | 7 | "The Great White Shark Hunter" | Recap | March 24, 2005 | 20.89 | 7.7/21 |
With their roster down to only three members, camaraderie in Ulong became even closer; but Bobby Jon and Stephenie reaffirmed their alliance. At Koror, Ian and Tom competed against each other in a fishing contest. Ian brought a giant clam; not to be outdone, Tom slayed a giant shark, dazzling his tribemates.: Reward challenge: Tribes must construct an SOS signal. The most creative yet recognizable signal wins a plane that will airdrop a crate full of additional camping supplies, some food and sewing supplies.; At the reward challenge, Ulong dismantled their shelter and spelled out their tribe name, while Koror's more comical "Got Food?" signal won and gave them additional camping supplies. After days of starvation, Bobby Jon brought a giant clam for his tribe hoping that it would help them win the next immunity challenge.: Immunity challenge: Two tribemates must manipulate a giant sliding puzzle while the last tribe member will act as their caller. The first team to finish their puzzle (a sea star) wins Immunity.; In the immunity challenge, Ulong struggled again as Bobby Jon gave up as their caller and gave the job to Stephenie. Though Stephenie made Ulong's work progress, Coby's puzzle prowess gave Koror another win to send the Ulong trio back to Tribal Council. At Ulong, Stephenie was unsure if Bobby Jon was still committed to his pact with her. Ultimately, Bobby Jon was true to his word to Stephenie and Ibrehem was voted out.
| 145 | 8 | "Neanderthal Man" | Recap | March 31, 2005 | 19.75 | 7.0/20 |
Now only a duo, Bobby Jon and Stephenie felt discomfort in losing challenges but were still eager to win. In Koror, Coby became infuriated about his female tribemates' laziness.: Reward challenge: The participating contestants would partake in a balut eating competition. There would be four rounds, starting with 1 balut, with each round adding another one. It was not a race, and the contestants would switch off each round In the case of tie, the two strongest eaters would go head-to-head to eat 5 balut. The tribe to finish their balut first would win bath essentials and a portable shower containing 55 gallons of potable water.; At the reward challenge, Bobby Jon struggled to swallow as he put all his servings in his mouth, but Tom strategically ate one egg at a time, thus granting Koror another victory. Back at Koror, their reward became a controversy as tribe leader Tom insisted to use the portable shower (containing drinkable water) for drinking purposes only. At Ulong, Bobby Jon became angry and blamed himself for the loss, which scared Stephenie. At Koror, Tom revealed to Ian that he has a secret alliance with Stephenie way before the tribes were created.: Immunity challenge: The tribes must race out to a series of floating platforms, swim under them in order to collect puzzle pieces, swim back to shore, and drop off the puzzle pieces on the beach. Once they have collected all the pieces, the tribes must assemble the puzzle and solve a word jumble using the pieces. The first tribe to correctly unscramble the mystery word ("victory at sea") wins Immunity.; At the immunity challenge, it was a close race, but Coby and Gregg solved their puzzle first, Koror prevailed once more. With only two members remaining it was impossible to vote either Ulong member off, so Bobby Jon and Stephenie competed in an elimination challenge at Tribal Council, where they confessed that they were uncomfortable with the idea of them being adversaries.: Elimination challenge: At Tribal Council, the two remaining members of Ulong must create a fire high enough to light their elevated torch. The loser will be eliminated from the game.; In the elimination challenge, though skeptical about her fire-making abilities, Stephenie narrowly defeated Bobby Jon, securing her place in the game and eliminating Bobby Jon. Stephenie had to go back to Ulong camp alone.
| 146 | 9 | "I Will Not Give Up" | Recap | April 7, 2005 | 20.00 | 7.1/ |
At Koror, Coby constantly complained about the others being dysfunctional, such as Janu's drama, Jenn and Katie's inactivity, and Tom's machismo. At Ulong, with all her tribemates gone, Stephenie tearfully struggled to fend for herself. But after receiving a sealed canister in the Tree Mail, she was instructed to go to the Koror camp and gleefully left her now desolate campsite. It was revealed that the canister holds a brown buff and she officially joins Koror^{1}, while the challenges from there on out will be individual. Tired of each other, Stephenie was welcomed by Koror with open arms, but most of the tribe agreed that she was a major threat after seeing her confidence and strength. Then, two Palauan natives, Edwin and Joe, taught Koror how to fish, gave them additional fishing equipment, and held a feast. Meanwhile, Coby got fed up with everyone for leaving him out of the "fun" (Gregg, Ian, and Tom were chosen to go fishing instead of him) and openly told Stephenie about the others' strategies and alliances, angering most of his tribemates.: Immunity challenge: The Survivors must stand on a perch under the changing weather conditions for as long as they can. Meanwhile, Jeff will occasionally tempt players with food. The last person standing will win Individual Immunity.; At the first Individual immunity challenge, Coby for the second time, revealed Koror's secrets. After the others, including the obviously vulnerable Stephenie, bailed out for various food items, Tom was the last person standing and won Immunity. At Tribal Council, Coby again openly spilled all strategies and problems of his tribe; which prompted everyone except Janu to vote against him instead of Stephenie. In the end, Coby's jealousy of Ian and Tom's leadership, constant complaining and revealing too much of the tribe dynamics to Stephenie, resulted in his elimination as he became the first member of the Jury.
| 147 | 10 | "Exile Island" | Recap | April 14, 2005 | 18.66 | 6.4/ |
Janu clashed with Gregg and Katie because of the former's work ethic and her dramatic demeanor.: Reward challenge: Koror will be split into two teams of 4. The teams must race into the water to erect a custom tower using scaffolding. The first team to construct their tower, climb it, retrieve a flag and race the flag back to the beach wins an authentic Palauan Feast.; In the reward challenge, the heavy scaffolding proved stress for the survivors, but the worn out team of Caryn, Gregg, Janu, and Tom won a Palauan feast. At the feast, Janu vomited, angering her fellow winners. Returning from the feast, Gregg gave Ian's team some leftovers from the feast, but Janu and Caryn impolitely ate some of it, annoying Katie.: Immunity challenge: A steel cage would be set up in the water at low tide, with the castaways huddled inside under a steel tier. With the rising tide, the Survivors must fight for air, and the last player to stay under the cage would win Immunity. In a twist, the first castaway to bail out from the challenge will be sent to an untouched beach.; In the immunity challenge, Janu was the first to give up and was sent to an uninhabited island, while Tom won Immunity again. In seclusion, Janu became happy as she was away from the others that alienated her. After many hours, Janu created fire and danced joyously. Back at Koror camp, the tribe was torn between Janu, who no one liked but several people wanted to keep around because she was not a threat and could be gotten rid of whenever the stronger players wanted, and Stephenie who was popular and a fierce competitor but also a huge threat to win if she could reach the final Tribal Council. In a heated Tribal Council, Janu revealed that she was fed up with the others and the game so she decided to "throw a wrench" to the probable plan of voting out Stephenie and voluntarily left the competition, joining Coby on the jury.
| 148 | 11 | "I'll Show You How Threatening I Am" | Recap | April 21, 2005 | 19.34 | 6.8/ |
After another lucky reprieve, Stephenie tried to shake things in Koror as she conspired with the women to get rid of the males (Tom, Ian and Gregg) and take advantage of their gender majority.: Survivor Auction: Each contestant will be given US$500. The items available in the auction will be remained covered after someone takes them. Players may share money and the item. Auction will end without further notice and included food and drink items as well as letters from home.; After a series of food items, Jeff then revealed letters from home in which the tribe (except Ian and Jenn) bought and declared the auction closed after. Back at camp, the castaways temporarily put the game aside and took a moment from themselves as they read their letters.: Immunity challenge: Players must stand behind a line in front of 35 multicolored ceramic tiles, each color representing a different Survivor. The Survivors must toss coconuts at their tiles, trying to smash them. If a castaway smashed an opponent's tile by accident, the opponent would get the benefit. The first Survivor to smash (or to have smashed by others) all five of their tiles would win Immunity.; In the immunity challenge, Tom accidentally hit one of Ian's colored tiles, which gave Ian Immunity. Despite strong lobbying, the six original Koror members ultimately turned on Stephenie, as the last Ulong standing, and she was voted out.
| 149 | 12 | "We'll Make You Pay" | Recap | April 28, 2005 | 20.07 | 7.1/21 |
With Ulong completely obliterated, the six remaining Koror members started to scramble as Tom, a physical threat, and Caryn, being on the outs, talked about their voting options and future schemes.: Reward challenge: Each player would be assigned a fire wok suspended over the water. Each time a Survivor correctly answers a question about Palauan culture/history, they may lower an opponent's wok. The last person with their flame still burning would win a yacht trip with two other castaways of the winner's choice.; In the quiz-type reward challenge where Gregg won, he revealed his true colors as he selected Jenn and Katie over Caryn, Ian, and Tom on a luxury yacht trip, angering the trio. Back at camp, knowing she was next to go, Caryn agreed to be a new wheel with Tom and Ian for dismantling their five-person alliance with Gregg, Jenn, and Katie. At the yacht trip, Gregg, Jenn, and Katie were enjoying their massage therapy, their loved ones (Gregg's best friend, Jenn's sister, and Katie's brother-in-law) appeared as an additional reward.: Immunity challenge: Players will compete through a series of obstacles they have already seen in previous challenges: navigating a net maze, solving a miniature version of the sea star puzzle, eating balut, unleashing lock-boxes and target shooting. One player would be eliminated at each round, and the last castaway standing wins Immunity.; At the immunity challenge, Ian and Tom were on even ground, up until the final round, where Ian successfully hit his three targets and retain Immunity in his possession. Back at camp, Ian approached Katie about blindsiding Gregg to prevent a possible tie, much to Katie's shock. In the end, Katie avoided the possible tie and joined Caryn, Ian, and Tom in voting out Gregg.
| 150 | 13 | "It Could All Backfire" | Recap | May 5, 2005 | 19.30 | 6.9/ |
After Koror disposed Gregg, his sweetheart Jenn was shocked yet kept calm after the predicament. Meanwhile, Tom talked to Caryn about his distrust with Katie. Ian promised Katie that if he wins the reward challenge, he will take her.: Reward challenge: Survivors would race into the lagoon on bamboo rafts and collect a series of mileage markers. Once all the markers were collected, they must be placed under the sign marker designating the distance from Palau to various big cities. The first player to place all the markers correctly would win a Chevrolet Corvette, and an overnight stay in a hillside Palauan mansion where he will feast together with a companion of their choice.; After Ian won the reward challenge, Katie was offended as Ian took Tom with him instead of her. Angered by the move and with the absence of the boys, Katie approached the other remaining girls, plotting another women's alliance. After their reward, Ian confronted Katie of his deception, but Katie got emotional and deemed him untrustworthy. Ian then begged for forgiveness, which Katie eventually accepted.: Immunity challenge: Survivors must traverse a watercourse to get reference to an arrangement of various icons on a puzzle grid. Next, they must make their way back to the start to rearrange their own icons on a blank grid to match what they had seen on the course. The players must repeat the watercourse until one of them replicated their grid exactly in order to win Immunity.; At the immunity challenge, Tom was not at his prime, forgetting the appearance of his grid and constantly stumbling throughout the course, but ultimately won the challenge and secured his spot in the final four. Back at camp, Ian and Tom speculated that while they were gone for the Reward, the women may have made an alliance. Ian reaffirmed his alliance with Katie and insisted to vote out Caryn. At Tribal Council, Caryn spilled out everyone's strategies and alliances, hurting Ian, Jenn, Katie, and Tom, who retaliated by unanimously voting Caryn out.
| 151 | 14 | "The Ultimate Shock" | Recap | May 12, 2005 | 20.80 | 7.8/18 |
After a series of prickly vote-outs, the four remaining members of Koror contemplated that amidst the game-playing, unpredictable weather and intense challenges, all agreed that their closeness was unmatched. In a conversation with Jenn and Katie, Ian said that, should Tom lose the immunity challenge, he would break his deal with Tom and vote him out in order to maximize his chances of making the final two.: Immunity challenge: Survivors must race along a tire crawl, then navigate through a series of vertical escape hatches to reach the top of a three-story tower. Once at the top of the tower, the Survivors must use grappling hooks to retrieve keys that unlock a hatch covering a flag, which they must raise. The first two players to finish would race down a flying fox into the ocean and retrieve a combination lock box containing another flag. After figuring out the box's combination, the Survivors must retrieve the flag and raise it. The first to raise this final flag wins Immunity.; At the immunity challenge, Tom and Ian were neck-and-neck once again, but Tom triumphed for his fourth collective individual immunity win. Back at camp, the four agreed publicly that Jenn was going home, with Tom deciding to stay loyal to the final three pact he had made with Ian on day two. That night, Ian let slip to Tom that he was happy Tom won Immunity, because it would have been a hard decision for Ian if he had won. Tom was baffled by the fact that his longtime ally would have had a "hard decision," so he talked to Jenn, who informed him that Ian had indeed said he would turn on Tom. At a late-night Tribal Council, all of the controversy came out in the open, with Tom and Katie hurt by Ian's lies. Katie and Ian stuck to the final three pact and voted against Jenn, but Jenn and Tom – realizing that Ian wouldn't have been true to him – voted against Ian, leaving a 2–2 tie. They were still deadlocked 1–1 after Tom and Katie re-voted. It was revealed that a challenge between Ian and Jenn would take place to resolve the tie.: Tiebreaker challenge: At Tribal Council, Ian and Jenn must create a fire high enough to burn through an elevated rope which will raise a flag. The loser will be eliminated from the game.; Though the challenge started on even ground, Ian was the first to get the fire high enough to burn through a rope and raise a red flag, and Jenn was eliminated from the game. Back at camp, Tom and Katie accused Ian of being two-faced for not honoring their alliance, while the latter exclaimed that they are in a competition. After a tribute to their fallen castaways, the three remaining contestants took part in the final immunity challenge.: Immunity challenge: The Survivors must each grab onto a navigational buoy and hang on while the buoy swayed from side-to-side. The last player left hanging on would win Final Immunity.; Katie stepped down after almost 5 hours while Ian and Tom held onto their buoys even as the challenge approached the 12-hour mark. But with the feeling of guilt after Tom and Katie's accusations against him, Ian stepped down and asked the now-immune Tom to vote him out as a sign of integrity. Since the challenge ended at late night and it was too late to conduct a Tribal Council, Ian was verbally eliminated by Tom. The next day, Katie and Tom ceremoniously burned their shelter and everything that helped them survive the past 39 days. In the Final Tribal Council, Tom was commended for his dominance in challenges and leadership skills; but was berated for being overbearing and a sexist. Katie on the other hand praised for her honesty, but was lambasted for being two-faced, weak in challenges and riding on Ian and Tom's coattails. When Jury member Janu asked Katie to state 3 adjectives, both positive and negative, to describe her gameplay, Katie simply told Janu she didn't expect to get her vote and she was not going to answer her. Katie also responded sharply to a critical question from Caryn.
| 152 | 15 | "Reunion" | N/A | May 19, 2005 | 21.70 | 8.3/18 |
Months later, the votes were read. With six votes to one, Tom was declared the tenth Sole Survivor over Katie. The castaways return to discuss the season with Jeff Probst.

== Voting history ==
| | No tribes | | Original tribes | | | | | | | | | | | Absorbed tribe | | | | | | | | |
| Episode | 1 | | | 2 | 3 | 4 | 5 | | | 6 | | 7 | 8 | 9 | 10 | 11 | 12 | 13 | 14 | | | |
|---|---|---|---|---|---|---|---|---|---|---|---|---|---|---|---|---|---|---|---|---|---|---|
| Day | 2 | | 3 | 6 | 8 | 11 | 12 | | | 15 | | 18 | 21 | 24 | 27 | 30 | 33 | 36 | 37 | | | 38 |
| Tribe | None | | Ulong | Ulong | Ulong | Ulong | Koror | Ulong | | Ulong | | Ulong | Ulong | Koror | Koror | Koror | Koror | Koror | Koror | | | Koror |
| Eliminated | Jonathan | Wanda | Jolanda | Ashlee | Jeff | Kim | Willard | Tie (Note: The first Tribal Council vote resulted in a tie. Per the rules, a second vote was held where the castaways involved in the tie would not vote and the remaining castaways could only vote for those who tied.) | Angie | Tie | James | Ibrehem | Bobby Jon | Coby | Janu | Stephenie | Gregg | Caryn | Tie | Tie (Note: The second Tribal Council vote also resulted in a tie. As there were only four castaways remaining, the two tied castaways would compete in a fire making challenge to resolve the tie.) | Jenn | Ian |
| Votes | Eliminated (Note: Neither Jonathan nor Wanda were chosen for either of the two tribes and were therefore eliminated.) | | 6–3 | 6–1–1 | 4–2–1 | 5–1 | 8–1 | 2–2–1 | 3–0 | 2–2 | 2–0 | 2–1 | Challenge (Note: No vote; As there were only two players remaining in the Ulong tribe, they competed in a fire-making challenge to resolve the elimination. Bobby Jon lost the challenge to Stephenie.) | 7–1–1 | Quit (Note: No vote; Janu decided to quit the game.) | 6–1 | 4–2 | 4–1 | 2–2 | 1–1 | Challenge (Note: Jenn lost the fire-making tiebreaker to Ian.) | 1–0 |
| Voter | Vote | | | | | | | | | | | | | | | | | | | | | |
| Tom | | | | | | | Willard | | | | | | | Coby | | Stephenie | Gregg | Caryn | Ian | Ian | | Ian |
| Katie | | | | | | | Willard | | | | | | | Coby | | Stephenie | Gregg | Caryn | Jenn | Jenn | | None (Note: Ian and Katie were not eligible to vote as the only eligible players they could vote for were each other.) |
| Ian | | | | | | | Willard | | | | | | | Coby | | Stephenie | Gregg | Caryn | Jenn | None (Note: This player was not eligible to vote in the second round of voting.) | Won | None |
| Jenn | | | | | | | Willard | | | | | | | Coby | | Stephenie | Caryn | Caryn | Ian | None | Lost | |
| Caryn | | | | | | | Willard | | | | | | | Coby | | Stephenie | Gregg | Ian | | | | |
| Gregg | | | | | | | Willard | | | | | | | Coby | | Stephenie | Caryn | | | | | |
| Stephenie | | | Jolanda | Ashlee | Jeff | Kim | | Bobby Jon | Angie | Ibrehem | James | Ibrehem | Won | Coby | | Caryn | | | | | | |
| Janu | | | | | | | Willard | | | | | | | Stephenie | Quit | | | | | | | |
| Coby | | | | | | | Willard | | | | | | | Janu | | | | | | | | |
| Bobby Jon | | | Angie | Ashlee | Kim | Kim | | Angie | None | James | James | Ibrehem | Lost | | | | | | | | | |
| Ibrehem | | | Angie | Kim | Jeff | Kim | | James | Angie | James | None | Stephenie | | | | | | | | | | |
| James | | | Jolanda | Ashlee | Kim | Kim | | Angie | Angie | Ibrehem | None | | | | | | | | | | | |
| Angie | | | Jolanda | Ashlee | Jeff | Kim | | Bobby Jon | None | | | | | | | | | | | | | |
| Willard | | | | | | | Katie | | | | | | | | | | | | | | | |
| Kim | | | Jolanda | Ashlee | Jeff | James | | | | | | | | | | | | | | | | |
| Jeff | | | Jolanda | Ashlee | James | | | | | | | | | | | | | | | | | |
| Ashlee | | | Jolanda | Jeff | | | | | | | | | | | | | | | | | | |
| Jolanda | | | Angie | | | | | | | | | | | | | | | | | | | |
| Wanda | Eliminated | | | | | | | | | | | | | | | | | | | | | |
| Jonathan | Eliminated | | | | | | | | | | | | | | | | | | | | | |

Jury vote
| Episode | 15 | |
|---|---|---|
| Day | 39 | |
| Finalist | Tom | Katie |
| Vote | 6–1 | |
| Juror | Vote | |
| Ian | Yes | |
| Jenn | Yes | |
| Caryn | Yes | |
| Gregg | Yes | |
| Stephenie | Yes | |
| Janu | Yes | |
| Coby | | Yes |

== Reception ==
Survivor: Palau has generally received praise from fans and critics alike, particularly for the gameplay of winner Tom Westman, and such memorable moments as the "bah-bah-buoy" challenge that lasted almost 12 hours (the longest challenge in American Survivor history), as well as the first-ever "tribe of one" in Survivor history. Host Jeff Probst ranked it as his 4th-favorite in 2010, citing the memorability of the buoy challenge and also calling Westman "one of our greatest winners." Andrea Deiher of Zap2it similarly ranked Palau as #4, saying that LaGrossa "became maybe the toughest woman ever to play the game," and called the buoy challenge "the most epic immunity challenge ever." Tom Santilli of Examiner.com ranked it 7th, saying that it "was one of the strongest [seasons], and featured a very memorable overall cast," adding that the "tribe of one" incident "may be one of the saddest moments in history, and cemented Stephanie in the hearts of many fans." Entertainment Weekly's Dalton Ross ranked it as the ninth-best season of the series, saying that he "loved watching one tribe decimate the other...the challenges may have been Survivors best ever," and although he claimed that everyone "knew Tom would win from episode 1, it was still gripping nonetheless."

In 2014, Joe Reid of The Wire ranked it 10th, stating that Westman "went pretty much wire-to-wire in barnstorming this season," and played "Perhaps a perfect game," while also noting that "Stephanie and Bobby Jon won our hearts by surviving the longest on the decimated Ulong tribe, the losingest tribe of all time." In 2015, a poll by Rob Has a Podcast ranked Palau 13th out of 30 with Rob Cesternino ranking this season 9th. This was updated in 2021 during Cesternino's podcast, Survivor All-Time Top 40 Rankings, ranking 18th out of 40. Palau was also ranked 13th on "The Purple Rock Podcast," with the summary stating: "Palau has a lot of things going for it: great challenges, a good cast, an interesting way to start the game, and several great story arcs. All of those factors work into an interesting final episode that make the season memorable and result in an excellent winner." In 2020, Inside Survivor ranked this season 17th out of 40 citing "its wholly unique story—a story unlike any other season that came before or after" with the decimation of the Ulong tribe. In 2024, Nick Caruso of TVLine ranked this season 13th out of 47.

In addition to host Probst naming this as one of his favorite seasons, he stated that the final immunity challenge was his favorite immunity challenge from any season. He also said Palau was his favorite filming location. Survivor earned a Primetime Emmy Award nomination in 2005.
