= The Traitors (American TV series) season 1 =

The Traitors
- Season 1
- Promotional poster
- Presented by: Alan Cumming
- No. of contestants: 20
- Winner: Cirie Fields
- Runners-up: Quentin Jiles; Andie Vanacore
- Location: Ardross Castle, Scottish Highlands
- No. of episodes: 11

Release
- Original network: Peacock
- Original release: January 12 – February 28, 2023

Season chronology
- Next → Season 2

The first season of the American television series The Traitors premiered on Peacock on January 12, 2023, with all episodes being released. The season concluded on February 28, 2023 with Cirie Fields winning as a Traitor, while Quentin Jiles and Andie Vanacore placed as runners-up, as Faithfuls. The season won Outstanding Casting for a Reality Program at the 75th Primetime Creative Arts Emmy Awards.

== Format ==
The first season of the show retained the same format and challenges as the first season of The Traitors UK. The arrived contestants at the castle are referred to as the "Faithful," and among them are the "Traitors," a group of contestants secretly selected by the host, Alan Cumming. Each night, the Traitors would decide who to "murder," and that same contestant would leave the game. After the end of each day, where the contestants participated in various challenges to add money to the prize fund, they would participate in the Round Table, where they must decide who to banish from the game, trying to identify the Traitor.

If all the remaining players are Faithful, then the prize money is divided evenly among them. However, if any Traitors remain, they win the entire pot.

== Contestants ==
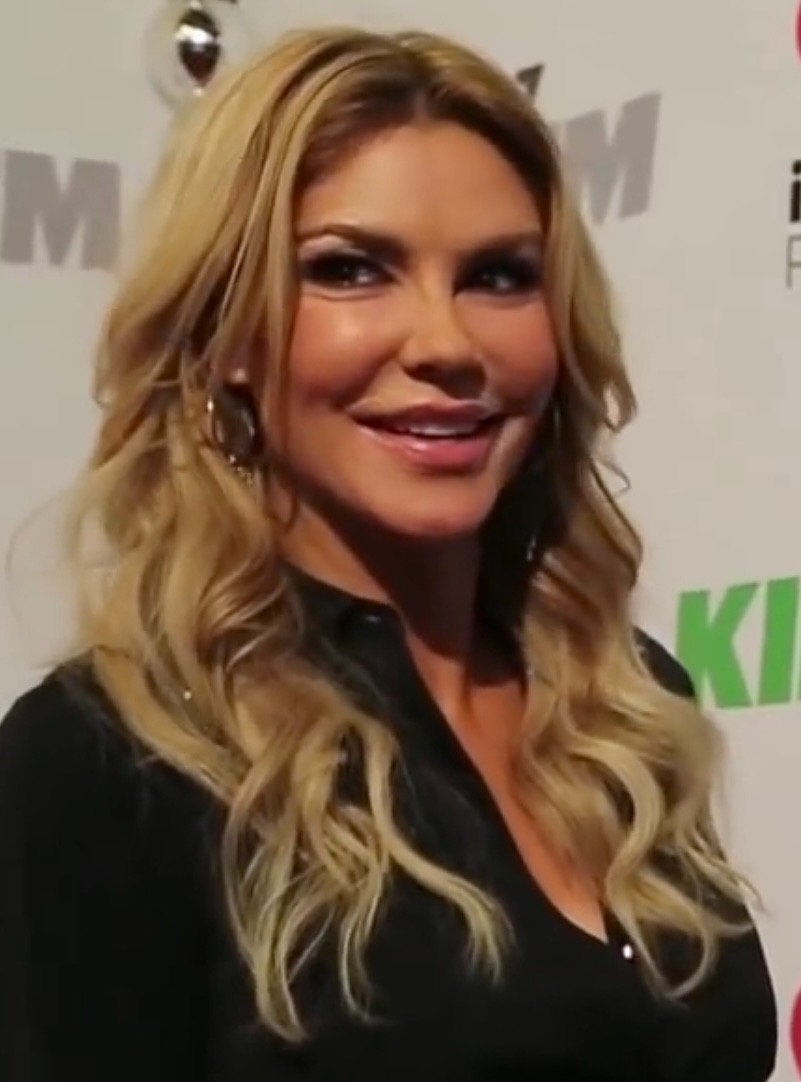
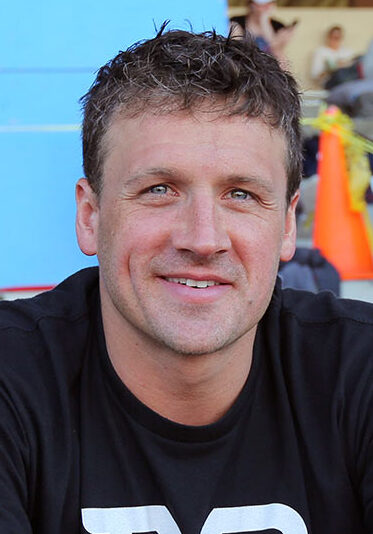
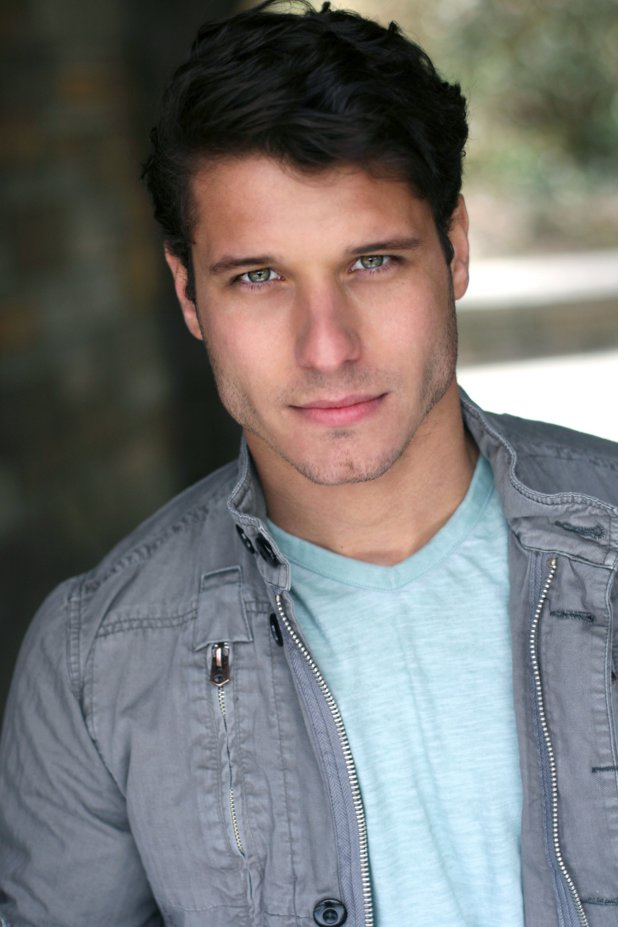
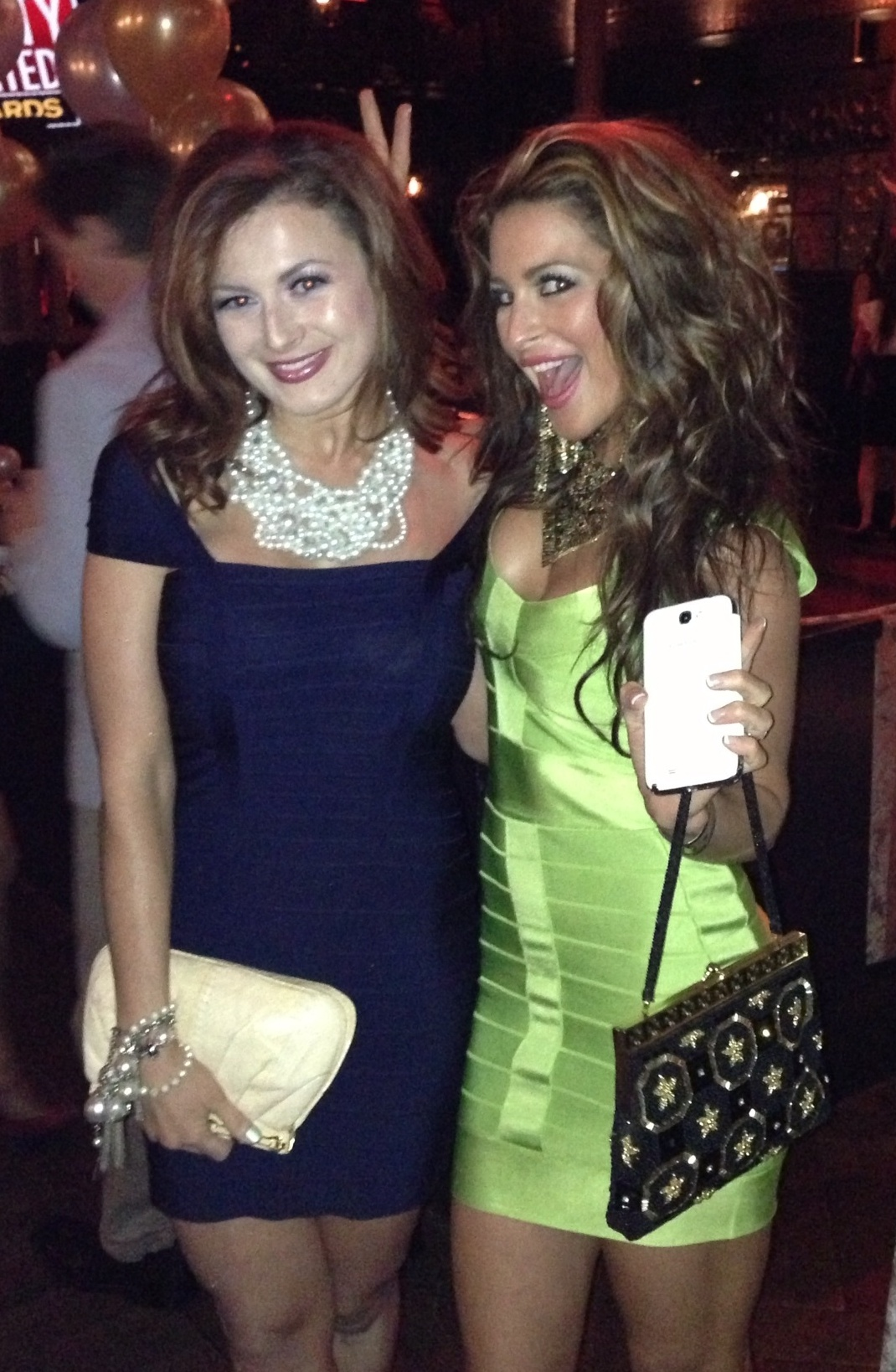
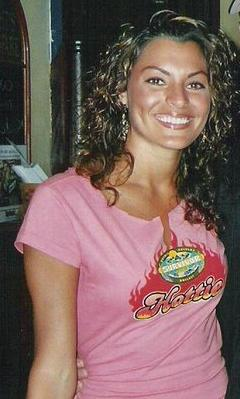
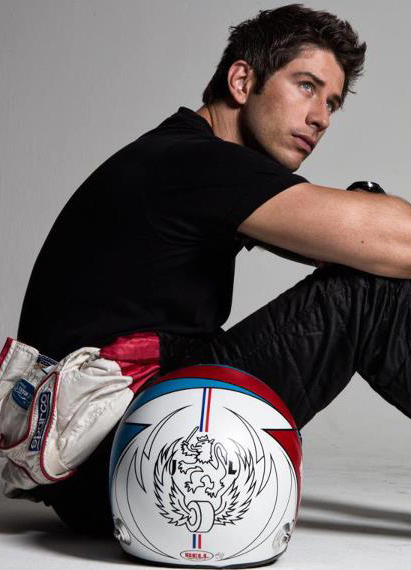
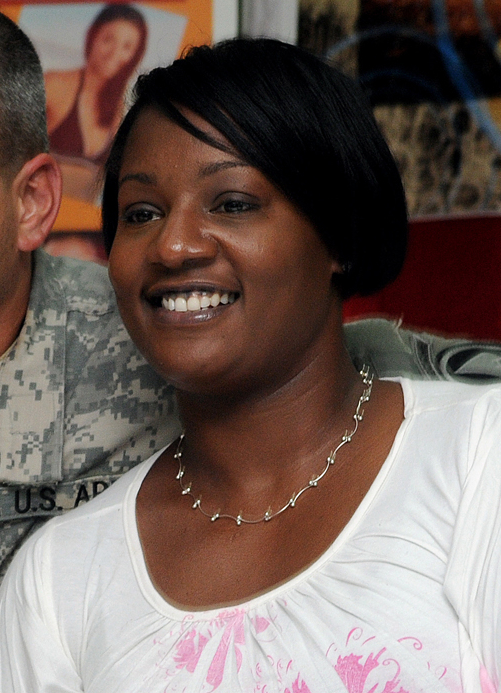
From left to right: Brandi Glanville, Ryan Lochte, Cody Calafiore, Rachel Reilly (left), Stephenie LaGrossa Kendrick, Arie Luyendyk Jr. and Cirie Fields

The cast was a mix of notable reality television personalities and non-celebrity people.

List of The Traitors contestants
Contestant	Age	From	Occupation/Original series	Affiliation	Finish
Reza Farahan	48	Los Angeles, California	Shahs of Sunset	Faithful	Murdered (Episode 2)
Geraldine Moreno	29	North Hollywood, California	Actress	Faithful	Banished (Episode 2)
Robert "Bam" Nieves	33	Rye, New York	Tech sales executive	Faithful	Murdered (Episode 3)
Brandi Glanville	49	Beverly Hills, California	The Real Housewives of Beverly Hills	Faithful	Banished (Episode 3)
Azra Valani	35	Los Angeles, California	Yoga instructor	Faithful	Murdered (Episode 4)
Michael Davidson	35	Oneida, Kentucky	DMV office manager	Faithful	Banished (Episode 4)
Ryan Lochte	37	Gainesville, Florida	Olympic swimming champion	Faithful	Murdered (Episode 5)
Kyle Cooke	39	New York City, New York	Summer House	Faithful	Banished (Episode 5)
Amanda Clark-Stoner	30	Carlisle, Pennsylvania	Emergency room nurse	Faithful	Walked (Episode 5) (Note: In Episode 5, Clark-Stoner left the game for "personal reasons." After the show, this was revealed to have been a positive test for COVID-19.)
Cody Calafiore	32	New York City, New York	Big Brother 16	Traitor	Banished (Episode 6)
Anjelica Conti	28	Staten Island, New York	Hair stylist	Faithful	Murdered (Episode 7)
Shelbe Rodriguez	31	Beaumont, Texas	Public affairs manager	Faithful	Banished (Episode 7)
Rachel Reilly	37	Birmingham, Alabama	Big Brother 12	Faithful	Banished (Episode 8)
Stephenie LaGrossa Kendrick	42	Dunedin, Florida	Survivor: Palau	Faithful	Murdered (Episode 9)
Christian de la Torre	28	Los Angeles, California	Veteran	Traitor	Banished (Episode 9)
Kate Chastain	39	Fort Lauderdale, Florida	Below Deck 2	Faithful	Banished (Episode 10)
Arie Luyendyk Jr.	40	Scottsdale, Arizona	The Bachelorette 8	Traitor (Note: Luyendyk Jr. was recruited as a Traitor in Episode 7.)	Walked (Episode 10) (Note: Luyendyk Jr. chose to remove himself from the game and admitted to being a Traitor before a vote was held.)
Quentin Jiles	32	Houston, Texas	Political analyst	Faithful	Runner-up (Episode 10)
Andie Vanacore	30	Reno, Nevada	Music services director	Faithful	Runner-up (Episode 10)
Cirie Fields	51	Jersey City, New Jersey	Survivor: Panama	Traitor	Winner (Episode 10)

== Episodes ==
The Traitors season 1 episodes
No. overall	No. in season	Title	Original release date
1	1	"The Game Is Afoot"	January 12, 2023
2	2	"Buried Alive"	January 12, 2023
3	3	"Murder They Wrote"	January 12, 2023
4	4	"Life or Death Situation"	January 12, 2023
5	5	"Getting Away with Murder"	January 12, 2023
6	6	"Suspicion and Sabotage"	January 12, 2023
7	7	"The Mask Is Slipping"	January 12, 2023
8	8	"Cabins in the Woods"	January 12, 2023
9	9	"Trust No One"	January 12, 2023
10	10	"The Grand Finale"	January 12, 2023
11	11	"Reunion"	February 28, 2023

== Elimination history ==
Key
The contestant was a Faithful
The contestant was a Traitor

Episode	2	3	4	5	6 (Note: The Traitors' decision and the mission took place in Episode 6, but the Round Table and Banishment Vote took place during Episode 7.)	7	8	9	10
Traitors' Decision	Reza	Bam	Azra	Ryan	Anjelica; Kate; Rachel	Anjelica	Arie	Stephenie	None
Traitors' Decision	Murder				On Trial (Note: Instead of selecting one Faithful to be murdered, the Traitors were asked to put three players on trial. The next night, only those three players would be up for elimination.)	Murder	Seduce (Note: In Episode 7, the remaining Traitors were given the opportunity to recruit a Faithful. The Faithful would then have the opportunity to accept or decline. Christian and Cirie chose Arie, and he accepted the offer.)	Murder	None
Shield	None				Arie	Arie	Arie	None	None
Banishment	Geraldine	Brandi	Michael	Kyle	Cody	Shelbe	Rachel	Christian	Kate
Vote	11–8	8–6–3	11–4	9–4	7–3–1	7–1–1	6–2	4–2 (Note: The deciding votes at the Round Table (cast by Andie and Cirie) were shown at the start of Episode 10.)	3–2
Cirie	Geraldine	Brandi	Kate	Kyle	Cody	Shelbe	Rachel	Christian	Kate
Andie	Michael	Brandi	Michael	Kyle	Cody	Shelbe	Rachel	Christian	Kate
Quentin	Geraldine	Kate	Kate	Kyle	Kate	Shelbe	Rachel	Kate	Kate
Arie	Michael	Brandi	Michael	Kyle	Cody	Shelbe	Rachel	Christian	Quentin
Kate	Michael	Michael	Michael	Kyle	Rachel	Rachel	Rachel	Christian	Quentin
Christian	Geraldine	Brandi	Kate	Kyle	Cody	Shelbe	Rachel	Kate	Banished (Episode 9)
Stephenie	Geraldine	Kate	Michael	Kate	Cody	Shelbe	Kate	Murdered (Episode 9)	
Rachel	Geraldine	Brandi	Michael	Kate	Cody	Shelbe	Kate	Banished (Episode 8)	
Shelbe	Michael	Michael	Michael	Kyle	Rachel	Stephenie	Banished (Episode 7)		
Anjelica	Michael	Michael	Michael	Kyle	Cody	Murdered (Episode 7)			
Cody	Geraldine	Michael	Michael	Kyle	Rachel	Banished (Episode 6)			
Amanda	Geraldine	Brandi	Michael	Kate	Quit (Episode 5)				
Kyle	Geraldine	Michael	Michael	Kate	Banished (Episode 5)				
Ryan	Geraldine	Kate	Michael	Murdered (Episode 5)					
Michael	Geraldine	Brandi	Kate	Banished (Episode 4)					
Azra	Michael	Brandi	Murdered (Episode 4)						
Brandi	Michael	Michael	Banished (Episode 3)						
Bam	Geraldine	Murdered (Episode 3)							
Geraldine	Michael	Banished (Episode 2)							
Reza	Murdered (Episode 2)								

=== End game ===
Episode	10			
Decision	Banish	Arie	End Game	Game Over; Traitor Win
Vote	1–3	No Vote (Note: After Cirie chose "Banish," Arie chose to remove himself from the game and admitted to being a Traitor before the vote was held.)	3–0	Game Over; Traitor Win
Cirie	Banish	No Vote	End Game	Winner
Andie	End Game	No Vote	End Game	Runners-up
Quentin	End Game	No Vote	End Game	Runners-up
Arie	End Game	No Vote	Quit	

== Missions ==
Episode	Title	Money available	Money earned	Total pot	Shield winner
1	"The Game Is Afoot"	$30,000	$30,000	$30,000	—N/a
Split into two groups, players must set fire to two giant wicker beasts. Half of the team must row into the loch where they will retrieve a flame and bring it back to shore. At the same time the remaining players must search through piles of debris to locate, prime, and build the fuse that connects to their effigies. The first team to complete the challenge will add $20,000 to the prize. If the second team also completes the mission, another $10,000 would be added to the pot.: Green Team: Andie, Anjelica, Arie, Brandi, Kate, Kyle, Michael, Reza, Ryan, and Stephenie; Blue Team: Amanda, Azra, Bam, Christian, Cirie, Cody, Geraldine, Quentin, Rachel, and Shelbe; The green team was the first to complete the mission, adding $20,000 to the pot. The Blue team also completed the challenge, adding $10,000.
2	"Buried Alive"	$30,000	$20,000	$50,000	—N/a
First, Alan asked the players for six volunteers. Amanda, Arie, Bam, Kyle, Shelbe, and Stephenie volunteered. They were then buried alive in underground graves at an undisclosed location. The remaining players split up into three teams. Each team was responsible for finding two of the buried players. The buried players each had a walkie talkie and a clue inside their coffin that could be used to communicate with the teams. Every player rescued from their grave was worth $5,000 for the prize fund, and the teams had 40 minutes to complete the mission.: Blue Team: Andie, Anjelica, Azra, Cirie (finding Arie and Stephenie); Red Team: Geraldine, Kate, Michael, Quentin (finding Shelbe and Amanda); Yellow Team: Brandi, Christian, Cody, Rachel, Ryan (finding Bam and Kyle); The Yellow Team rescued Bam and Kyle and added $10,000 to the prize fund. They then helped the Red Team free Amanda and Shelbe to another $10,000. The Blue Team didn’t free either of their players and didn't add any money to the pot.
3	"Murder They Wrote"	$25,000	$25,000	$75,000	—N/a
The contestants divided into two groups. The first group, consisting of seven players, had to ring the bells of the nearby chapel to play a tune. The remaining ten players stayed at the castle, where they had to match the music from the bells to a music box in Alan's collection. Each box has a figurine that corresponds to an item in the castle. Each round was five minutes, and every correct item brought back added $5,000 to the pot.
4	"Life or Death Situation"	$22,000	$19,900	$94,900	—N/a
Five contestants were randomly selected to be strapped to a revolving wheel, while the remaining contestants answered superlative-style questions. Each player on the wheel also answered the question. For each answer that matched what the group picked, $300 would be added to the pot. Players on the wheel could tap out, but they would receive an additional $5,000 if everyone stayed on for the entire round. In the first round, Andie, Anjelica, Christian, Kate, and Shelbe were selected to ride the wheel. They got 12 correct answers for a total of $3,600, and all five players stayed on the wheel for an additional $5,000. In round two, Amanda, Cody, Kyle, Michael, and Ryan were selected to ride the wheel. They gave 21 correct answers for $6,300, and once again all five players stayed on the wheel for a $5,000 bonus.
5	"Getting Away with Murder"	$20,000	$20,000	$115,000 (Note: The prize pot stood at $114,900, but Alan was "feeling generous" and rounded the pot up to $115,000.)	—N/a
The contestants were split into two teams and one at a time went into the confessional where Alan gave them a paragraph and line to find. They had to then bring that reference back to their team to find a riddle in a large book. The riddle would lead them to a clothing item worn by one member of the masked congregation. Only the first team to identify an item counted, and each correctly identified item earned $5,000 for the pot. Teams only had one guess per round, and there were 4 rounds.: Team 1: Amanda, Christian, Cirie, Quentin, Shelbe, Stephenie; Team 2: Andie, Anjelica, Arie, Cody, Kate, Kyle, Rachel; Team 1 won all four rounds and added $20,000 to the prize fund, while Team 2 added nothing to the pot.
6	"Suspicion and Sabotage"	$30,000	$16,800	$131,800	Arie
As a group, the contestants had 90 minutes to transport whisky barrels to an old distillery on the top of a nearby hill. Along the path were fifteen barrels valued between $600 and $10,000. Any barrels that made it across the finish line before time was up would add money to the prize. There were also three special barrels on the path that represented a pass to the Armory. If the group got all three Armory barrels across the finish line, then they could send three players to the Armory for a chance to win a Life Shield. If all three Armory barrels didn't cross the finish line, then no one would be allowed into the armory. The group got eight barrels across, including the three Armory passes. The group selected Rachel, Anjelica, and Arie.
7	"The Mask is Slipping"	$30,000	$2,000	$133,800	Arie
Split into three groups, the players would enter the Billiards Room, which had been filled with knick knacks, junk, and props. Each group would have a few minutes to take notice of everything in the room until the lights cut and the "spirits of past players" would change three things in the room. Each group would then have 60 seconds to identify what items were changed. If the group can identify one item, they add $1,000 to the pot, if they can identify two items they add $5,000, and three identified items would add $10,000. In addition the group that adds the most money to the pot would all have the chance to go to the armory and win a Life Shield.: Team 1: Kate, Shelbe, and Stephenie; Team 2: Andie, Cirie, and Rachel; Team 3: Arie, Christian, and Quentin; Team 1 and Team 3 identified one item each, while Team 2 didn’t identify any of the changes. Since Team 3 locked in their items faster, they were declared the winners, and Arie, Christian, and Quentin visited the Armory. Arie earned the Shield for the second time in a row.
8	"Cabins in the Woods"	$35,000	$35,000	$168,800	Arie
The remaining eight players were split into two teams, and each team was given an identical cabin for the mission. Teams had 30 minutes to escape from their cabin. Two players would be on either side, and they each had to solve puzzles that would give them the combination to the padlock on the other side. On the first side (Quentin and Christian for the Blue Team, and Arie and Stephenie for the Green Team) players had to count rats of different colors to decipher the first padlock, while the other two players had bugs rain down on them. Then the second pairs (Cirie and Kate for the Blue Team, and Rachel and Andie for the Green Team) had to put their heads in boxes filled with various creepy crawlies to find the second combination. Each team that escaped would add $17,500 to the pot. In addition whichever team completed the mission first would win a trip to the Armory.: Blue Team: Christian, Cirie, Kate, Quentin; Green Team: Andie, Arie, Rachel, Stephenie; Both teams escaped their cabins, earning a total of $35,000 for the prize fund. The Green Team escaped first, earning all four of them a trip to the Armory. For the third time in a row, Arie found the Shield.
9	"Trust No One"	$25,000	$13,000	$182,000 (Note: The prize pot stood at $181,800, but Alan was "feeling generous" and rounded the pot up to $182,000.)	—N/a
The contestants were given fifteen minutes to individually make their way through a room and steal artifacts which were protected by lasers. Each artifact was worth a set amount of money for the prize fund. After each attempt, another laser was added. If a player set off a laser, they were eliminated from the mission, any artifacts being carried would be lost, and one minute would be deducted from the timer. After all six contestants made an attempt, the remaining players were given a second opportunity. In the first round, Cirie, Quentin, and Andie made it through, adding $1,500, $8,000, and $2,000 respectively to the pot, while Christian, Kate, and Arie were unable to make it past the lasers. In the second round, Quentin and Cirie were unable to make it through the lasers, but Andie made it through and added another $1,500 to the prize fund.
10	"The Grand Finale"	$68,000	$68,000	$250,000	—N/a
Hidden around Loch Glass were three bags holding various amounts of money. The team had one hour to retrieve as many bags as possible. To start, two players (Arie and Kate) jumped out of a helicopter and swam to two buoys to get a combination that unlocked the keys to Alan's speedboat. The remaining players had to take the speedboat and a map to find all three bags. Meanwhile, once back on shore, the first two players were given a second padlock to crack which would give them the location of a fourth bag worth $43,000. The team retrieved all four bags, adding $68,000 to the pot and bringing the total prize to the full $250,000.

== Production ==
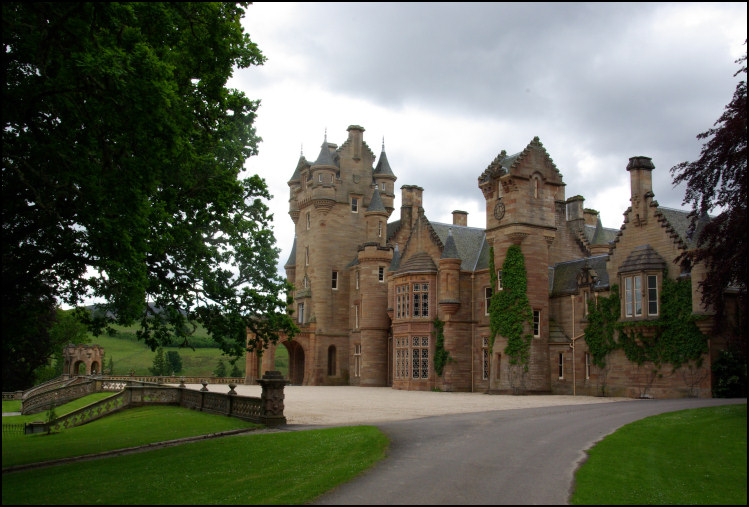
The season filmed at the Ardross Castle in a rural region of Scotland.

The season is produced similarly to its British counterpart, with the same production company, Studio Lambert, in the same location at Ardross Castle in the Scottish Highlands.

The first season of The Traitors featured ten former reality television participants and ten members of the general public. One player, Kevin Greene, was removed during the first day of the competition due to a positive COVID-19 test and the game was restarted with an alternate player, Geraldine Moreno, replacing him.

== Reception ==
The first season of the American edition of The Traitors received positive critical acclaim with many praising the show's cast, concept and setting. On review aggregator website Rotten Tomatoes, it holds an approval rating of 95% based on 20 reviews, with an average rating of 7.50/10. The site's critical consensus reads: "Hosted by Alan Cumming with theatrical relish, The Traitors deploys a rogues' gallery of reality television stars to make for a compelling murder mystery party." Alex Abad-Santos of Vox wrote that it "combines the acute pain of a corporate team-building exercise with some of the most emotionally fragile reality show celebrities that have ever been on television... and it's perfect." Alim Kheraj of The Guardian rated the show 4 out of 5 stars writing that "by the time you reach episode eight (which could already scoop the award for the year’s best hour of reality TV), the tension is so unbearable that you will be glad the last two episodes are there for binging." Linda Holmes of Pop Culture Happy Hour summarised the season as "Goofy, hyperdramatic, suspenseful and pretty entertaining." Dustin Rowles of Pajiba described the season as "A slickly produced version of Mafia set in a Scottish castle that features a number of contestants familiar to reality-show audiences and a number of newbies to make the whole enterprise more unpredictable." adding that "It’s really fun." Andy Dehnart of Reality Blurred wrote that "The Traitors had me a few seconds into its first episode, and only tightened its grip from there. This is outstanding competition reality TV, with all of the elements sliding confidently into place."
