= Rachel Reilly =

American actress and television personality

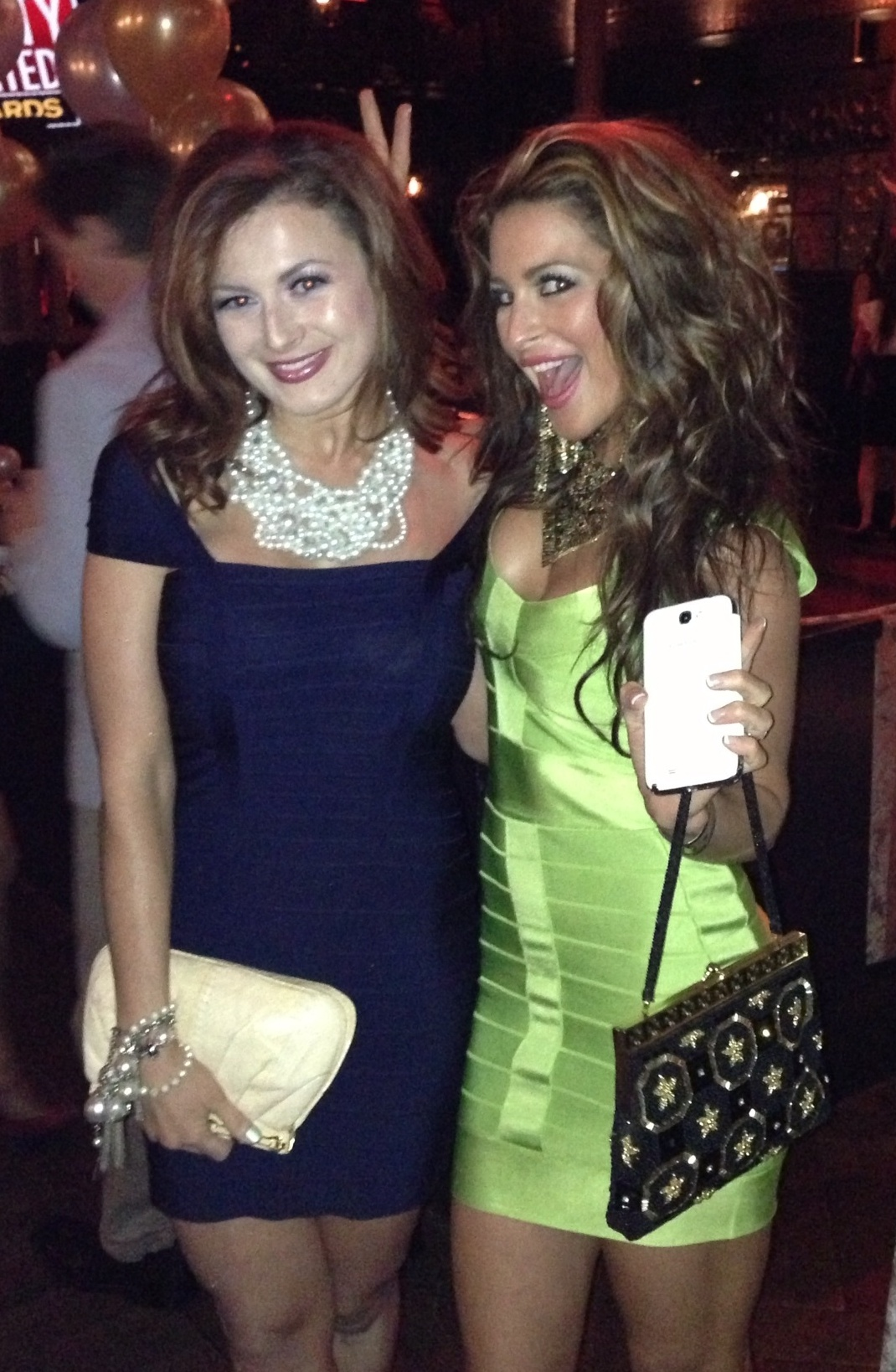
- Reilly (left) with sister Elissa Slater in 2013

Resident representative of the Van Nuys Neighborhood Council for Zone 2
- In office May 2019 – June 2023
- Succeeded by: Kathy Schreiner

Personal details
- Born: Rachel Eileen Reilly; October 16, 1984 (age 42) Concord, North Carolina, U.S.
- Spouse: Brendon Villegas (m. 2012)
- Children: 2
- Education: Western Carolina University
- Occupation: TV personality; talk show host; actress
- Known for: Big Brother 12; Big Brother 13 (winner); Big Brother 27; The Amazing Race 20; The Amazing Race 24; The Amazing Race 31; Celebrity Fear Factor (winner); Snake in the Grass (co-winner); The Traitors 1; Worst Cooks in America 28

Rachel Eileen Reilly Villegas (born October 16, 1984) is an American television personality and actress. After appearing as a HouseGuest on the twelfth season of the American edition of the reality series Big Brother in 2010, she returned for the thirteenth season in 2011, which she went on to win. She later returned as a HouseGuest on the twenty-seventh season in 2025.

She has also participated in two seasons of The Amazing Race with her husband Brendon Villegas, placing third both occasions. She participated in a third season with her sister Elissa Slater, placing seventh. She has also won Celebrity Fear Factor and Snake in the Grass.

== Early life ==
Rachel Eileen Reilly was born in Concord, North Carolina and attended First Assembly Christian School in Concord. She graduated from Northwest Cabarrus High School, also in Concord, in 2002. Reilly is a member of the Phi Mu sorority and graduate from Western Carolina University in Cullowhee, North Carolina with a bachelor's degree in chemistry in 2007.

Reilly has one sister, Elissa Slater, who competed on Big Brother's 15th season. Slater also appeared on The Amazing Race 31 with Reilly, where they placed 7th overall.

== Reality television ==
=== Big Brother ===
==== Season 12 ====
Reilly first appeared on Big Brother in its twelfth season, aired in the summer of 2010. Within the first week of the season, Reilly entered into a romantic relationship with fellow houseguest Brendon Villegas, leading to the pair becoming immediate targets. Despite being nominated in the first week, Reilly was spared when the rest of the house decided fellow nominee Annie Whittington was a bigger threat.

Reilly won two Head of Household competitions during her stay in the house, in the second and fourth weeks, resulting in the evictions of Monet Stunson and Kristen Bitting. Reilly was known for her many feuds during her stay, most notably with Ragan Fox and Britney Haynes. Eventually, Reilly and Villegas were nominated together in the fifth week of the season. Despite Villegas' attempts to get the other players to keep Reilly instead of him, Reilly was evicted unanimously. Reilly later returned to the house as a guest for one day as part of the "Pandora's Box" twist. As a result of her ninth-place finish, Reilly became the first member of the Big Brother 12 jury, and eventually voted for runner-up Lane Elenburg to win the $500,000 prize.

==== Season 13 ====
One year later, Reilly and Villegas (by then her fiancé) returned to Big Brother for its thirteenth season, as part of a "Returning Duos" twist. Reilly claimed she was returning to the show in a bid to redeem herself following her previous appearance. Reilly and Villegas quickly forged an alliance with the four other returning players, father and daughter, Dick and Daniele Donato of Big Brother 8 and fellow couple, Jordan Lloyd and Jeff Schroeder of Big Brother 11, as well as a side alliance with Porsche Briggs. The alliance, known as "the Veterans," dominated the house in the early weeks, with Reilly winning Head of Household (HoH) in the first and third weeks, as well as the Power of Veto in a two-person challenge with Villegas in the first week.

The alliance fell apart in the second of Reilly's HoH weeks, when Daniele was caught in her attempts to turn the two couples against each other. However, Daniele then proceeded to win the next HoH competition, nominating Reilly and Villegas against each other, sparking a long-running feud between the two women. After winning the Power of Veto, Villegas decided to use it on Reilly, effectively ensuring his own eviction. Reilly was nominated again the following week, but was spared when confusion about an upcoming twist caused Lawon Exum to volunteer to be evicted in her place, in the mistaken belief that it would give him an advantage in the game. In reality, the evicted player and the winner of an America's Choice vote would compete to return, with Villegas winning the vote and then beating Exum in the subsequent competition, regaining his place in the game. His stay was short lived however, as he was evicted at the hands of Donato once again a week later.

Reilly took revenge the following week, evicting Daniele after finding herself as the swing-vote. After narrowly surviving an eviction vote 3–2 against Schroeder, Reilly paired with Lloyd when the duos twist briefly returned, and won a key Veto competition that kept them both in the game at the expense of Shelly Moore. Reilly then followed up by winning HoH for the third time, resulting in the eviction of Kalia Booker. After failing to win the final Veto competition, Reilly reformed her early alliance with Briggs, and the pair worked together to make the final two, with Briggs evicting Lloyd in the final four stage, and then Reilly evicting Adam Poch the following week after she won HoH for the fourth time.

Reilly was crowned the winner of Big Brother 13 in a vote of 4–3 over Briggs, earning the jury votes of Villegas, Schroeder, Lloyd and Moore, and losing the votes of Donato, Booker and Poch. Reilly won $500,000 for winning the show.

==== Season 27 ====
Reilly returned to Big Brother as a surprise 17th houseguest for the 25th anniversary season that premiered July 10, 2025. She is the only returning houseguest on the season. She was eliminated on day 60 by losing in the "White Locust" competition and placed 9th overall and was the first member of the jury. Reilly went on to vote for fellow houseguest Ashley Hollis to win the game.

==== Other seasons ====
Reilly briefly returned to the house during Big Brother 14 as a Pandora's Box "prize" for Ian Terry. She then made a brief appearance in the premiere episode of Big Brother 15, giving her sister, Elissa, a key to the Big Brother house. She also appeared later in the season, offering her opinion on the season and her sister's gameplay. She appeared in a similar role during the closing stages of the second season of Big Brother Canada and Big Brother 16, discussing the game and prospects of the remaining HouseGuests. In Big Brother 20, she returned to the house to host a Power of Veto competition. In Big Brother 28, she entered the house as a Fake HouseGuest for the season's premiere.

==== Records ====
In being nominated for eviction five times and still making it to the end to win the $500,000 prize. Additionally, in winning the third part of the final Head of Household competition (which she won by providing the only correct answers), she tied Janelle Pierzina's record of multi-seasonal HoH competition wins at six. She is also tied with Drew Daniel, Pierzina, Hayden Moss, Ian Terry, Aaryn Gries and Caleb Reynolds for the most sole HOHs won in a season at four.

=== Post-Big Brother ===
The day following her Big Brother win, Reilly and Villegas appeared on CBS talk-show The Talk, co-hosted by Big Brother hostess Julie Chen Moonves. Reilly discussed her experiences on Big Brother during her appearance and won a vacation to Aruba, after competing in a Big Brother style challenge. In 2013, Reilly began appearing in a Hollywood production of The Real Drunk Housewives of San Fernando Valley, a musical parody of the television show.

Reilly is currently a fashion designer and TV Producer and Casting Agent.

=== The Amazing Race ===
==== The Amazing Race 20 ====
Reilly and Villegas were on the season 20 of The Amazing Race, which premiered on February 19, 2012. They ended up in 3rd place out of 11 teams in the final leg, losing to border patrol agents of Art Velez and J.J. Carrell (runners-up) and the married couple Rachel and Dave Brown Jr. (winners). During the competition, Reilly was shown breaking down into tears several times, and also got into arguments with competitor Vanessa Macias.

==== The Amazing Race 24 ====
After their marriage, Reilly and Villegas participated in The Amazing Race once more as part of its second All-Stars edition. Through the course of the season, the two won three legs, earning US$10,000 each and a trip to the Great Barrier Reef. However, they again finished the race in 3rd place. Reilly and Villegas are the first team to have completed all legs of the race on two separate seasons, with Reilly being the first woman competitor to complete this task (Eric Sanchez of seasons 9 and 11 had accomplished this earlier as the first male racer, but he had a new race teammate for his second season).

==== The Amazing Race 31 ====
Reilly participated for the third time of her career. This time, Reilly raced with her sister, Elissa Slater. They finished in 7th place. She also broke the all-time record for most legs raced ever on The Amazing Race during this season, which was later broken by Leo and Jamal. She still holds the female record for the most legs raced.

=== Celebrity Fear Factor ===
Reilly and Villegas participated in the episode titled "Royalty Rumble." Reilly and her husband climbed through cockroaches, snakes, frogs, crabs and maggots to complete a puzzle. They were immersed in a giant water tank upside down by their ankles to test their fear of drowning and how long they could handle the task. Finally, they completed the stunt of landing a helicopter on a moving 18-wheeler, disarming a bomb, and escaping before the truck blew up. Reilly and Villegas had the quickest time and won $50,000 for lung cancer charity.

=== Snake in the Grass ===
Reilly competed against fellow Big Brother and The Amazing Race alum Janelle Pierzina and former Survivor contestants Cirie Fields and Stephenie LaGrossa Kendrick for a chance to win $100,000. At the end of the episode, she, Pierzina, and Fields figured out that LaGrossa Kendrick was the Snake and the three of them split the grand prize money.

=== The Traitors ===
In 2023, Reilly competed on Peacock's reality TV series The Traitors alongside her fellow Snake in the Grass contestants Cirie Fields and Stephenie LaGrossa Kendrick. As a Faithful, she was banished from the game in the season's eighth episode, placing 8th overall.

=== Worst Cooks in America ===
In 2025, Reilly competed on Food Network's TV series Worst Cooks in America 28: Heroes Vs. Villains. She was placed on Antonia Lofaso's team, Team Villains. She placed 8th overall.

== Other television ==
Reilly has played a recurring role as a waitress on CBS's Emmy Award-winning soap opera The Bold and the Beautiful since 2010. She also landed a gig on Hollywood Today Live on FOX as their reality TV correspondent and the reality TV expert for the show.

Reilly's wedding to Villegas aired on WeTV, planned by celebrity wedding planner David Tutera.

== Political career ==
=== Van Nuys Neighborhood Council ===
On May 16, 2019, Reilly ran unopposed for the position of Zone 2 resident representative on the Van Nuys Neighborhood Council and was elected to a four year term with 178 votes. Reilly stated in an interview that she was driven by a desire to "be known for making an impact in LA" and also worked on community issues pertaining to homelessness, food bank efforts, beach cleanups, and tree planting events. She was succeeded in this seat in June 2023 by Kathy Schreiner.

== Personal life ==
Reilly met fellow Big Brother player Brendon Villegas while competing on the show's twelfth season. The two began a romance while on the show that continued after its completion. Villegas proposed on Valentine's Day 2011 and they married September 8, 2012.

In September 2015, Reilly and Villegas announced that she was pregnant with their first child together. Adora Borealis Villegas was born on April 8, 2016. In May 2020, Reilly and Villegas announced that she was pregnant with their second child together. Adler Mateo Villegas was born November 11, 2020.

== Filmography ==
=== Television - as self ===
Year	Title	Role	Notes
2011–12	The Brides of Beverly Hills	Guest	2 episodes
2012	Natural Born Sellers	Guest	Episode: "Buying a House Versus Buying a Condo"
2012	My Fair Wedding with David Tutera	Guest	Episode: "Brenchel"
2013	Hell's Kitchen	Dinner Guest	Season 11, episode 9
2014	Big Brother Canada	Guest	Season 2
2014	E Talk (Canada)	Guest	
2014	Hollywood Today Live	Correspondent – Segment Host	7 episodes
2018	Critics Choice Awards KTLA	Co-Host	Virtual Reality Segment
2018	Celebrity Big Brother	Guest	Season 1; Cameo musical number alongside Jodi Rollins, Jessie Godderz, Paul Abrahamian, Cody Nickson, and Jessica Graf.
2018	Off the Block with Ross and Marissa	Guest	2 episodes
2022	Better with the Brenchels	Host	8 episodes Bspoke TV network; executive producer
2026	Big Brother	Guest	Season 28; episode 1

=== Television - as actor ===
Year	Title	Role	Notes
2010–2014, 2025	The Bold and the Beautiful	Bikini Beach Waitress / Julie / Rachel	18 episodes
2011	The Consultant	Student	Video short
2022	Barbee Rehab	Fairy Barbie	12 episodes

=== Reality competition ===
Year	Title	Role	Results
2010	Big Brother 12	Contestant	9th Place
2011	Big Brother 13	Contestant	Winner
2012	The Amazing Race 20	Contestant	3rd Place
2014	The Amazing Race 24	Contestant	3rd Place
2018	Celebrity Fear Factor	Contestant	Winner
2019	The Amazing Race 31	Contestant	7th Place
2022	Snake in the Grass	Contestant	Co-Winner
2023	The Traitors 1	Contestant	8th Place
2025	Worst Cooks in America 28	Contestant	8th Place
2025	Big Brother 27	Contestant	9th Place

=== Films ===
Year	Title	Role	Notes
2015	AxeMan 2: Overkill	Breaker	
2016	Father aka Papa	Tiffany	
2016	The Letter Red	Abagail Wynter	
2017	Humble Pie	Lauren	
2022	Never Let Go	Rachel Monroe	
2026	The Other side of the Window	Rachel Red Carpet Host	
2026	Mistletoe Mansion	Rachel	
2026	Measure Twice	Chloe	

Preceded by Hayden Moss	Winner of Big Brother; Season 13	Succeeded by Ian Terry
