= Cirie Fields =

American nurse and reality TV personality

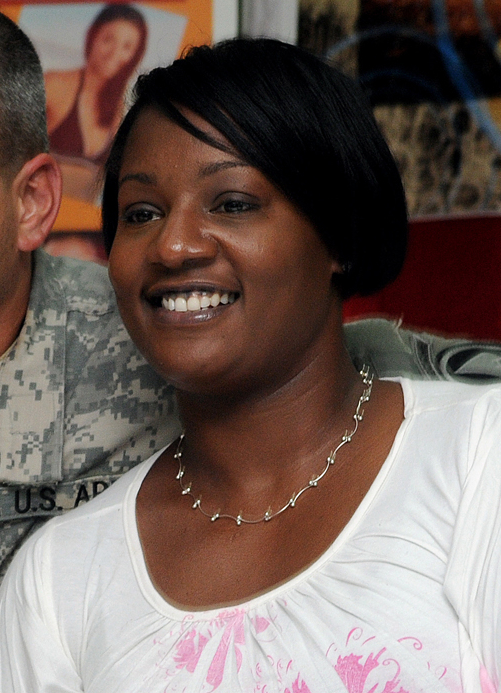
- Fields on a U.S. military tour in 2008
- Born: Cirie Tiffany Fields; July 18, 1970 (age 56); Brooklyn, New York, U.S.
- Television: Survivor: Panama; Survivor: Micronesia; Survivor: Heroes vs. Villains; Survivor: Game Changers; Snake in the Grass; The Traitors 1 Big Brother 25; Australian Survivor: Australia V The World; Survivor 50: In the Hands of the Fans
- Spouse: Clarencio "H.B." Hacker
- Children: 3

Cirie Tiffany Fields (/sɪˈriː/; born July 18, 1970) is an American reality television personality and nurse best known for competing on multiple seasons of Survivor. Fields holds the record for most appearances in the franchise.

In 2006, Fields appeared for the first time on Survivor: Panama, finishing in 4th place. In 2008, she returned and placed 3rd on Survivor: Micronesia. She made her third appearance on Survivor: Heroes vs. Villains in 2010, finishing 17th, and made her fourth appearance on Survivor: Game Changers, where she finished 6th and was eliminated without receiving a vote. In 2025, Fields represented the USA on the Australia V The World season of Australian Survivor, placing 4th, and in 2026, Fields returned to American Survivor for the sixth and final time to compete in Survivor 50: In the Hands of the Fans, finishing 6th.

In 2023, Fields competed on and won the first season of the American spin-off of The Traitors on Peacock. Later that year, she competed in the twenty-fifth season of Big Brother along with her son Jared Fields; she finished in 5th place. Fields was featured in Variety's 40 Most Powerful Women on Reality TV in 2023.

Although she has never won, she is often ranked among the greatest Survivor players. She was the first player to organize and carry out a successful plurality vote and the first to persuade another contestant to give up immunity. She is known for her persuasiveness and her ability to steer votes without drawing attention to herself.

== Early life ==
Fields was born on July 18, 1970, in Brooklyn. She grew up partially in Norwalk, Connecticut, with her sisters Karla and Cicely, and her brother Kenneth. She has worked as a surgical instrumentalist, home care provider, candy factory worker, and telemarketer. She studied nursing at St. Francis Nursing School in New Castle, Pennsylvania, where she earned her degree. She went on to work as a clinical coordinator at Norwalk Hospital Surgical Center.

== Survivor ==
Fields has participated in six different seasons of Survivor, including representing the United States on Australian Survivor: Australia V The World. She has been praised by series host Jeff Probst for being a self-proclaimed couch potato who "got up off the couch to live their adventure".

=== Panama ===
Fields first gained fame on Survivor: Panama — Exile Island. Originally cast as a member of Casaya, the tribe made up of the oldest women in the game, she was at risk of being the first one eliminated when her tribe lost the first Immunity Challenge. However, she used her persuasion skills to convince Melinda Hyder and Ruth-Marie Milliman to vote off Tina Scheer. When the four original tribes were contracted down to two, leaving only the La Mina and Casaya tribes in the contest, Fields was once again in the spotlight as one of the physically weakest competitors on the new Casaya tribe, but saved herself yet again on Day Six when Hyder was eliminated. Eventually, Fields was able to assimilate with her tribemates, and managed to make the merge.

With only four players in the game on Day 34, Danielle DiLorenzo and Terry Deitz teamed up to eliminate Fields after they were both sent to Exile Island by Aras Baskauskas, who would go on to win immunity on Day 36. Alone at camp, Fields and Baskauskas decided to vote out DiLorenzo (since Deitz probably had a hidden immunity idol and they did not want to risk it being used). Already predicting a draw and the subsequent fire-making challenge, Deitz coached DiLorenzo on starting a fire using flint, while Baskauskas did the same with Fields. At Tribal Council, the imminent tie vote happened and DiLorenzo and Fields were deadlocked at two votes each. The two faced off in the fire-making challenge where, using a flint and materials to support the fire (coconut shells, pieces of wood, straw, etc.), they were to create a bonfire high enough to burn through a rope. The first one to complete this task would survive, while the other would be sent to the jury. In this challenge, Fields lost and became the sixth member of the jury, placing fourth overall. In her final words following her elimination, Fields said that she was proud of having come so far in the competition.

At the Final Tribal Council, Fields voted for Baskauskas, over DiLorenzo, to win the prize of $1 million and the title of "Sole Survivor." During this season, Fields herself won a 2007 GMC Yukon pickup truck, for being voted most popular participant of the season by viewers.

=== Micronesia ===
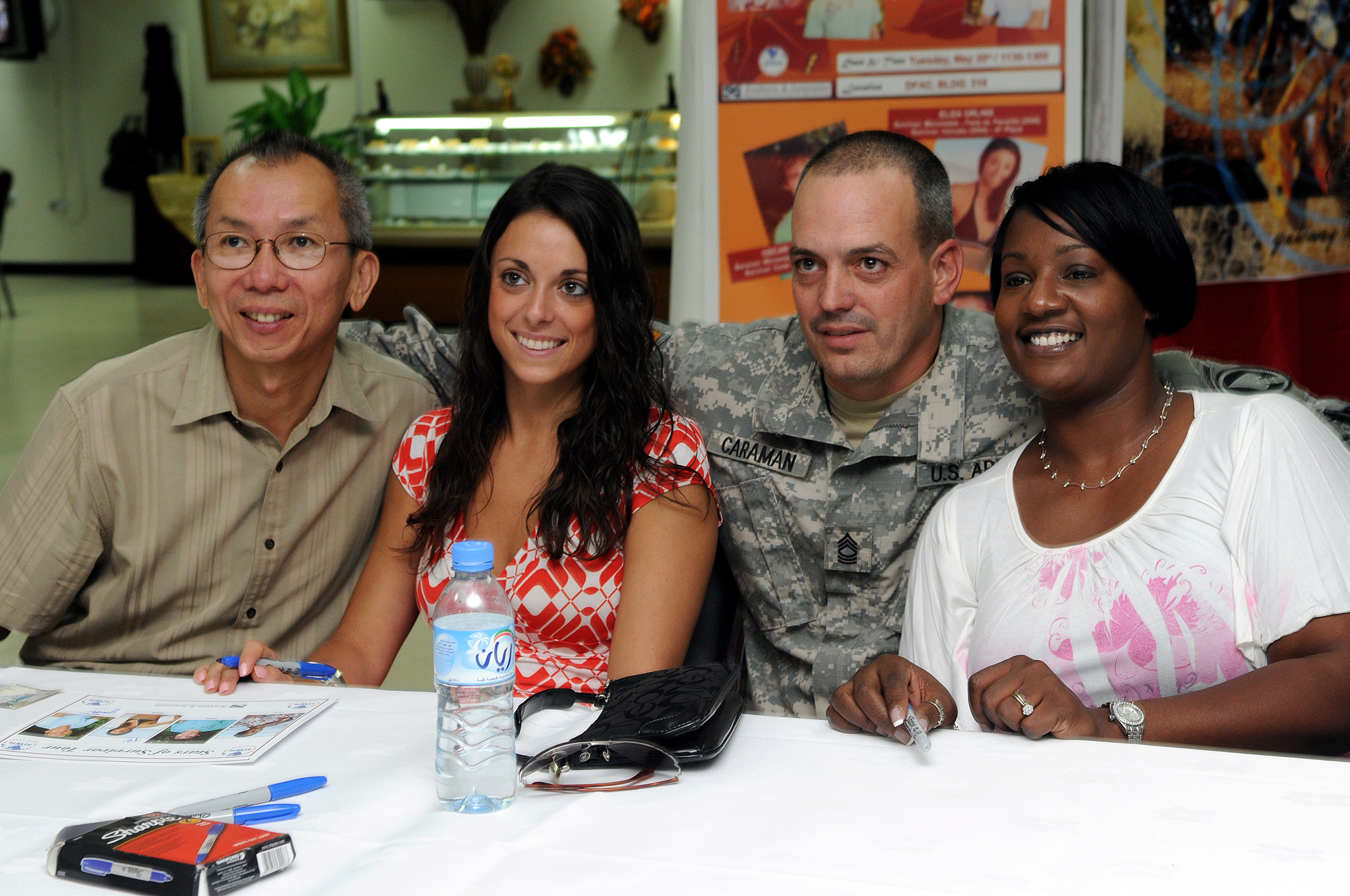
Fields (far right) and fellow Survivor: Micronesia castaways Yau-Man Chan (far left) and Eliza Orlins (second from left) with a fan in 2008

Two years after her first Survivor competition, Fields returned to the show for Survivor: Micronesia — Fans vs. Favorites, which premiered on February 7, 2008. She was initially assigned to Malakal, the tribe of "Favorites" or returning players, and floated between the two alliances within this tribe: one consisting of Ami Cusack, Eliza Orlins, Jonathan Penner and Yau-Man Chan; and the other consisting of Amanda Kimmel, James Clement, Oscar "Ozzy" Lusth and Parvati Shallow (with Jonny Fairplay also varying between both alliances). Fields volunteered to be sent to Exile Island with Kathy Sleckman of Airai, the tribe of "Fans" or first-time players in the game, after Malakal won the combined Reward/Immunity Challenge in Episode Two.

In the third episode of the season, she opted to join the alliance of Kimmel, Lusth, Clement, and Shallow after doubting the trustworthiness of Penner and Chan. Fields convinced her alliance to eliminate Chan instead of Orlins, as she considered him one of the biggest threats in the game. In Episode Four, Fields remained secure since her tribe had won Immunity. In the fifth episode the original tribes were switched and Fields ended up in the new Malakal tribe, formed by four Fans and four Favorites.

After the merge, Fields became part of the "Black Widow Brigade," an all-female alliance consisting of herself, Kimmel, Shallow, Natalie Bolton, and Alexis Jones. She concocted a plan to vote Ozzy out due to his being a physical threat and possessing an immunity idol. Cirie, along with Natalie, Alexis, Parvati, and Jason (who was slated to be eliminated) voted out Ozzy, and the women subsequently blindsided Jason with an idol in his pocket. The alliance was forced to vote out one of its own on day 33 after the lone surviving outsider, Erik Reichenbach, won his second straight immunity. That night, Fields, joined the majority of the tribe in voting against Kimmel, but to everyone's surprise Kimmel produced an immunity idol, which cancelled all the votes against her and sent Alexis Jones out of the game instead. On day 36 Reichenbach won immunity yet again, but Fields came up with a plan to keep the Black Widows intact. She would try to trick Reichenbach into thinking that he was considered untrustworthy and needed to give his immunity necklace to Bolton to re-earn the jury's respect. Fields even went so far as to assure him that she and Bolton would join him in voting out Shallow if he gave up immunity. The plan worked, and Reichenbach gave his immunity necklace to Bolton just before the vote. Without immunity, Reichenbach was unanimously voted out.

At that point, Fields was confident that she was just one Tribal Council away from securing a spot in the Final Tribal Council. But on day 38, following the elimination of Bolton, it was revealed that there would be one last immunity challenge and the Final Tribal Council would consist of two people instead of three. Kimmel won the final immunity, and Fields became the 18th person eliminated, ending in third place as the eighth and final member of the jury. Kimmel had feared that Fields would be extremely hard to beat and Shallow would be better opponent. Fields ended up casting her final jury vote for Shallow to win the $1 million prize and the title of "Sole Survivor," over Kimmel.

=== Heroes vs. Villains ===
For the third time in her career, Fields was chosen to participate in Survivor, this time for its 20th season, Heroes vs. Villains. As part of the Heroes tribe, she immediately became targeted for elimination by Tom Westman and Stephenie LaGrossa, but survived the first Tribal Council when the Heroes tribe unanimously eliminated Jessica "Sugar" Kiper, who was seen as the weakest and most emotional person on the tribe. In Episode Two, Fields and her tribemate, Candice Woodcock, became the decisive votes in eliminating LaGrossa by a 6–3 margin.

In Episode Four, after being given a clue to a hidden immunity idol and believing that Westman had found it, Fields devised a plan to eliminate a member of the opposing alliance and eventually the Immunity Idol. She wanted to split the votes between Westman and Colby Donaldson, but she did not count on J.T. Thomas, who had eavesdropped on her plans. At Tribal Council, Thomas betrayed his alliance and helped eliminate Fields after Westman used his idol. She was the fourth person eliminated from the season, placing 17th overall.

=== Game Changers ===
In 2017, Fields was featured in Survivor: Game Changers, her fourth time on the show, making her the third contestant, and the first female, to compete on Survivor four times. Initially placed on the Nuku tribe, she was eventually switched to the brand new Tavua tribe, then the Mana tribe, and finally, the merged Maku Maku tribe, making her the only player of the season to be on four different tribes. Fields was the only player to make it to the merge without having to attend a single Tribal Council, Following the merge, she aligned with Michaela Bradshaw. At the first post-merge Tribal Council, Bradshaw was targeted for elimination, but Fields managed to get Hali Ford voted out instead.

On Day 25, Fields struggled to finish the obstacle course featured in the reward challenge, but Jeff encouraged her to keep trying, and she eventually finished, albeit long after the challenge was decided. At that same challenge, Sarah Lacina had found a vote-stealer advantage hidden under a bench. A few days later, Lacina told Fields about this advantage. On Day 35, Lacina gave Fields custody of the advantage as a sign of trust, and Fields promised to give it back after Tribal Council was over. But at that night's Tribal Council, Fields tried to play the advantage, only to learn that it was non-transferable. Lacina, upset at Fields' attempt to usurp the advantage, immediately targeted Fields' ally Bradshaw, who was indeed voted out that night.

The following night, Brad Culpepper won immunity, and at Tribal Council, Fields joined Aubry Bracco and Tai Trang in voting against Lacina, while the rest of the tribe split their votes between Bracco and Trang. After the votes were cast, though, Trang played two idols: one for himself and one for Bracco. Lacina then played her Legacy Advantage, which gave her immunity at the Final Six. This prompted Troy "Troyzan" Robertson to play his own immunity idol as well. In the end, Fields, being the only one without any form of immunity, became the first player ever to be eliminated by default, despite having no votes cast against her that night, nor at any point during the entire season. She was the fifteenth person eliminated from the game, placing sixth overall and becoming the eighth member of the jury. As her torch was snuffed, Fields received a standing ovation from the jury members. At the Final Tribal Council, she voted for Lacina to win the $1 million prize over Culpepper and Robertson.

=== Australia V The World ===
In 2025, Fields competed on the world tribe of Survivor: Australia V The World. On the World tribe, she was joined by fellow Americans including two-time winner Tony Vlachos and her Micronesia ally, Parvati Shallow. She was also joined by Survivor NZ: Thailand winner and fan of Fields, Lisa Stanger, who developed an alliance with her. Similarly to her performance in Panama, Fields was again eliminated in fourth place after losing a fire-making challenge.

=== In the Hands of the Fans ===
Fields returned for the show's 50th season, Survivor 50: In the Hands of the Fans, in 2026. She was the 18th person voted out, finishing in 6th place. Due to her allies having some form of immunity, she was targeted and voted out by a margin of 4–2 on day 23, with close ally Rizo Velovic turning on her. At the Final Tribal Council, she voted for Aubry Bracco to win the $2 million prize over Jonathan Young and Joe Hunter. Following her elimination, Fields announced that In the Hands of the Fans would be her last season on Survivor, stating in an interview with Entertainment Weekly that "I have received so much more than I bargained for from this 20, 21-year experience, I don't really need to prove [anything]," but did not rule out competiting in other reality television competitions. At the reunion, it was revealed that the fans had voted for her to be awarded with the "Fan Favorite" prize of $100,000, as sponsored by the singer Sia.

=== Legacy ===
On December 12, 2011, Fields was inducted into Xfinity's Survivor Hall of Fame. In a 2011 Rob Has a Podcast community fan poll, Fields was ranked the 6th greatest contestant of all time. In a 2014 follow-up poll, she was ranked 7th. In a 2015 issue of CBS Watch magazine, commemorating the 15th anniversary of Survivor, she was voted by viewers as the tenth greatest contestant in the history of the series to date. In total, she has played the game of Survivor a total of 144 days (159 when including her 15 days on Australia v The World), making her one of only a handful of players to have passed the 100-day mark on Survivor.

When all twenty contestants of Survivor: Winners at War were asked to name the best player to have never won Survivor, Fields received the most support, with six winners choosing her: Natalie Anderson, Adam Klein, Yul Kwon, Rob Mariano, Parvati Shallow, and Nick Wilson.

== The Traitors ==
In 2023, she competed on the Peacock reality TV series The Traitors, on a cast that again included LaGrossa Kendrick and Reilly. Chosen to play as a traitor, she received the entire $250,000 prize pool for being the only traitor remaining at the end of the game.

She was chosen to be a Traitor; despite her preexisting reputation, she quickly made a lot of allies who trusted her during the game, protecting them and making sure they mostly went far. She kept a low profile, moving mainly when she needed things to go her way. Her skill in social strategy also allowed her to correctly judge the right moment to cut ties with allies, including other Traitors, Cody Calafiore and Christian de la Torre, to whom I betray and eliminate. In the end, Cirie scored a solo win by cornering her fellow Traitor, Arie Luyendyk Jr., and made it to the final three with two Faithfuls who fully trusted her.

== Big Brother ==
In 2023, Fields was cast on Big Brother 25 alongside her son Jared. She became the first former Survivor player to compete on Big Brother, and only the third ever to compete on both television shows.

She was evicted on day 93 by a vote of 2–0, finishing in 5th place.

== Other media appearances ==
In 2016, Fields appeared on a Survivor themed episode of The Price Is Right.

Fields was a contestant on the 2022 USA Network reality competition series Snake in the Grass alongside her former Heroes vs. Villains tribemate, Stephenie LaGrossa Kendrick. Fields split the $100,000 prize with Big Brother and The Amazing Race alums Janelle Pierzina and Rachel Reilly after they correctly determined that LaGrossa Kendrick was the Snake.

== Filmography ==
=== Television ===
Year	Title	Role	Notes
2006	Survivor: Panama — Exile Island	Contestant	4th place (16 episodes)
2006	Guiding Light	Internal Affairs Officer	Guest star (1 episode)
2008	Survivor: Micronesia — Fans vs. Favorites	Contestant	3rd place (16 episodes)
2010	Survivor: Heroes vs. Villains	Contestant	17th place (5 episodes)
2016	The Price Is Right	Contestant	Final Showcase (1 episode)
2017	Survivor: Game Changers — Mamanuca Islands	Contestant	6th place (13 episodes)
2022	Snake in the Grass	Contestant	Co-winner (1 episode)
2023	The Traitors 1	Contestant - Traitor	Winner (11 episodes)
2023	Big Brother 25	Contestant	5th place (39 episodes)
2023	The Bold and the Beautiful	Dr. Martin	Guest star
2024	Dirty Laundry	Herself (1 episode)	Episode: "Who Was Part of a Ritual to Ward Off Evil Spirits?"
2025	Survivor: Australia V The World	Contestant - World Tribe	4th place (10 episodes)
2026	Survivor 50: In the Hands of the Fans	Contestant	6th place (13 episodes)
2027	Extracted	Competitor	

Preceded by First	Winner of The Traitors; The Traitors 1	Succeeded by CT Tamburello, Trishelle Cannatella
