= Snake in the Grass (TV series) =

American reality television series

- Promotional poster
- Genre: Reality competition
- Presented by: Bobby Bones
- Country of origin: United States
- Original language: English
- No. of seasons: 1
- No. of episodes: 8

Production
- Executive producers: Craig Armstrong; David Garfinkle; Jay Renfroe; Mike Espinosa; Sam Hargrave
- Production location: Costa Rica
- Running time: 42 minutes
- Production companies: Red Shed Films; Renegade 83

Original release
- Network: USA Network
- Release: August 1 – September 17, 2022

Snake in the Grass is an American reality competition series broadcast on USA Network and hosted by Bobby Bones. Each episode features four contestants working together to complete challenges to win clues about the identity of the "Snake", a hidden saboteur within the group. At the end of each episode, the contestants vote for who they believe the Snake is and split a $100,000 prize if they successfully find the Snake, otherwise the Snake receives the prize money.

A special preview episode aired on July 26, 2022, on NBC, and the show officially premiered on USA Network on August 1 of the same year. On March 1, 2023, USA Network canceled the series after one season.

== Format ==
Each episode features a group of four players working together to complete a series of challenges. One of them has been secretly designated as the "Snake" and may attempt to sabotage the group's efforts while remaining undetected. At the start of the episode, host Bobby Bones meets with the group and gives them one clue to the Snake's identity. The group then attempts a challenge; completing it within a given time limit awards a second clue. Afterwards, the group spends the night at a campsite where they have the chance to find a third clue hidden in the area.

The following day, the group participates in a second challenge, receiving a fourth and final clue if they succeed. At the end of the day, the group meets at the "Snake Pit" where they discuss their thoughts on the Snake's identity. Each contestant then casts one vote as to who they believe the Snake is. If the three honest contestants vote correctly, they split $100,000 and the Snake receives nothing; if not, the Snake wins the entire prize.

== Contestants ==
The contestants were revealed on June 23, 2022. They include: Big Brother alumni Janelle Pierzina and Rachel Reilly; Survivor alumni Cirie Fields, Earl Cole, Malcolm Freberg, Stephenie LaGrossa Kendrick, Trish Hegarty and Yul Kwon; UFC Heavyweight fighter Todd Duffee, Naked and Afraid alumni Jeff Zausch and Lacey Jones; track and field athlete Alysia Montaño and Miss Massachusetts 2016 Alissa Musto.

Key
The Snake was declared the winner
The Snake was found and the honest contestants won
This contestant was The Snake

The Snake votes
Episode	Contestants				The Vote	Ref.
1	Alysia Montaño	John Gaber	Sean Williams	Trish Hegarty	Sean	
2	Alissa Musto	Andrew Muse	Ryan Anthony	Stephanie Ortiz	Stephanie	
3	Earl Cole	Jeff Zausch	Malcolm Freberg	Yul Kwon	Yul	
4	Elektra Nelson	Sam Ruebush	Wyatt Werneth	Xavier Williams	Sam	
5	Cirie Fields	Janelle Pierzina	Rachel Reilly	Stephenie LaGrossa Kendrick	Stephenie	
6	Brandon Horton	Chelsea Scott	Michael Steinbech	Piper “Nai” Knight	N/A (Note: This vote did not result in a majority of 3–1, thus The Snake was declared the winner.)	
7	Brett Kessinger	David Redmond	Lacey Jones	Rogerlyn Taylor	David	
8	Juliet Bell	Ryan McCune	Todd Duffee	Victoria Gusto	Todd	

== Episodes ==
No.	Title	Original release date	Prod. code	U.S. viewers (millions)
1	"You're Killing Me Bro!"	August 1, 2022	101	0.52
2	"I See You... Snake!"	August 8, 2022	102	0.48
3	"Masters of Gameplay"	August 15, 2022	103	0.50
4	"All Boys Are Snakes"	August 22, 2022	104	0.48
5	"Survivor vs. Big Brother"	August 29, 2022	105	0.48
6	"Bullying Behavior"	September 5, 2022	106	0.46
7	"Costa Rica Karen"	September 12, 2022	107	0.34
8	"Something Is Snakey Here"	September 17, 2022	108	0.27

== See also ==
- De Mol
