= Stephenie LaGrossa Kendrick =

American television personality (born 1979)

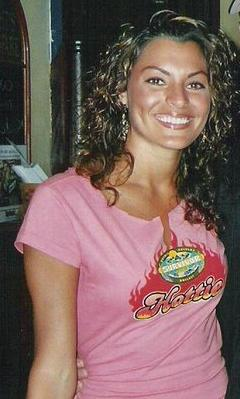
- LaGrossa Kendrick in 2005
- Born: Stephenie LaGrossa; December 6, 1979 (age 46); Philadelphia, Pennsylvania, U.S.
- Television: Survivor; Snake in the Grass; The Traitors
- Spouses: Michael Ward (m. 2006; div. 2007) Kyle Kendrick (m. 2010)
- Children: 3

Stephenie LaGrossa Kendrick (née LaGrossa; born December 6, 1979) is an American television personality best known for her multiple appearances on the American reality competition series Survivor. She first appeared on the show's tenth season, Survivor: Palau (2005), where she finished seventh and became a fan favorite. She was so popular among audiences that she was brought back the very following season, Survivor: Guatemala (2005), where she finished as the runner-up. She later competed on the show's twentieth season, Survivor: Heroes vs. Villains (2010), where she placed 19th. After marrying Philadelphia Phillies pitcher Kyle Kendrick in 2010, LaGrossa Kendrick took a twelve-year hiatus from reality television to focus on their family. She returned to the spotlight on Snake in the Grass in 2022, and went on to compete on the first season of The Traitors, finishing in seventh place. LaGrossa Kendrick returned to Survivor for a fourth time on its 50th season, Survivor 50: In the Hands of the Fans, in 2026 and placed 10th.

== Early life ==
Stephenie LaGrossa was born on December 6, 1979, to Stephen and Marguerite LaGrossa. She is the youngest of five children and the couple's only daughter. LaGrossa grew up in Glenolden, Pennsylvania. She attended Archbishop Prendergast High School, where she competed on the varsity lacrosse, field hockey and swimming teams. After graduating, she attended Temple University but later transferred to Monmouth University in Long Branch, New Jersey. She played Division One lacrosse at both institutions and was a four-year starter, captaining the team in her final year. She received athletic and academic scholarships and regularly appeared on the Dean's list for high-achieving students. She made the Northeast Conference Academic Honor Roll and was a three-time Northeast Conference All-Conference selection, Scholar/Athlete Award recipient, and nominee for Female Athlete of the Year. LaGrossa earned a Bachelor of Science degree in business administration, with concentrations in marketing and management.

== Television appearances ==
In January 2005, it was announced that LaGrossa had been cast on Survivor: Palau, the tenth season of the American reality competition series Survivor. Of the two tribes, Koror and Ulong, she was selected as a member of the Ulong tribe. Despite her strong individual performances in challenges, the Ulong tribe lost every immunity challenge, a first for the show, and were forced to vote their members out one by one. Once only two Ulong members remained, LaGrossa and Bobby Jon Drinkard, and the tribe lost again, they were told that the winner of a fire-making challenge would stay in the game while the loser would be eliminated. LaGrossa beat Drinkard in the challenge, becoming the last remaining member of Ulong. The next day, she was instructed to join Koror to commence the individual portion of the game. She was seen as a threat to win by her fellow competitors, so was later voted out, becoming the third member of the jury and receiving seventh place. At the Final Tribal Council, she cast her jury vote for Tom Westman, who went on to win the season over Katie Gallagher. After the season ended, she was noted for being one of the show's most popular contestants, (Note: Attributed to multiple references:) even being nominated for the Teen Choice Award for Female Reality/Variety Star in 2005.

In the premiere episode of the following season, Survivor: Guatemala, it was revealed that Drinkard and LaGrossa were returning to compete again, each being assigned to one of the two tribes: Nakúm and Yaxhá. LaGrossa was initially assigned to join Yaxhá. She survived the early stages of the game and reached the tribe switch, with LaGrossa being switched to Nakúm. By the time the two tribes merged into one, Xhakúm, LaGrossa had formed a six-person alliance of those who were members of the post-switch iteration of Nakúm. She managed to evade being voted out and ultimately reached the final two with Danni Boatwright, who was not a member of her alliance but had since infiltrated it, facing an angry jury that blamed her for their respective eliminations. The jury awarded Boatwright the million-dollar prize over LaGrossa, in a 6–1 jury vote.

In January 2010, LaGrossa was announced as one of twenty returning contestants on the cast of Survivor's twentieth season, Survivor: Heroes vs. Villains. The tribes were originally divided by the contestants' reputations from their previous seasons, with LaGrossa being a member of the Heroes tribe. After recovering from dislocating her shoulder in the first challenge of the season, LaGrossa found herself on the outside of a majority alliance and was consistently berated by her tribemate, James Clement. She was ultimately the second person voted out of the game, receiving 19th place.

After spending twelve years out of the spotlight to focus on her family, in June 2022, LaGrossa Kendrick was announced as a part of the cast of Snake in the Grass, appearing in one episode alongside Cirie Fields, and Big Brother alums Janelle Pierzina and Rachel Reilly. LaGrossa Kendrick was assigned the role of the snake, who secretly sabotages the group during challenges so they do not receive clues about the snake's identity. She lost the game as the other three correctly guessed the snake's identity at the end. Later in the year, LaGrossa Kendrick was confirmed as part of the cast of the first season of The Traitors, alongside Fields and Reilly. LaGrossa Kendrick was selected as a faithful, whose role is to identify the three selected traitors in the game and vote them out to win. LaGrossa Kendrick formed an alliance with Fields and Reilly and the three voted together throughout the game, unaware that Fields was one of the traitors the entire time. LaGrossa Kendrick was ultimately "murdered" (eliminated from the game) by the traitors, receiving seventh place.

LaGrossa Kendrick was cast on the 50th season of Survivor, Survivor 50: In the Hands of the Fans, which aired on February 25, 2026. She was voted out on the season's 10th episode, placing 10th. Rick Devens flipped a MrBeast coin, making the prize go up to 2 million dollars, and earned immunity and an immunity idol. She was then voted out in a 8-2 vote after using her Steal A Vote to take Rick Devens' vote and put two on Aubry Bracco, but it wasn't enough.

== Personal life ==
LaGrossa is Catholic. After graduating from Monmouth University, she remained a member of the Monmouth University Blue and White Club and worked with local high schools to help coach sports clinics. She resided in Toms River, New Jersey and worked as a territory sales representative for a pharmaceutical sales company and a part-time bartender before her initial appearances on Survivor. After her first two stints, she became an in-arena host for the Philadelphia Flyers, appeared in soap operas such as Guiding Light, briefly worked as a model and made personal and media appearances.

On Christmas Eve 2005, LaGrossa's longtime boyfriend, high school history teacher Michael Ward, proposed to her. After eight years of dating, they married on July 7, 2006. Their wedding took place in Seaside Heights, New Jersey, the town where they first met, and was attended by eight of LaGrossa's fellow Survivor castmates. LaGrossa and Ward ended their marriage after one year. After they divorced, LaGrossa became a co-owner of GIGI Restaurant & Lounge, a bar and restaurant in Old City, Philadelphia.

In July 2009, LaGrossa became engaged to Philadelphia Phillies pitcher Kyle Kendrick after a year of dating. They married on November 13, 2010. The wedding was held at the Silverado Resort and Spa in Napa County, California. The couple's home was burglarized in 2011, and Kyle's World Series ring was among the stolen items. All items were eventually recovered. In February 2011, LaGrossa announced that she was pregnant with their first child. Their first daughter, Sophia Marguerite, was born on September 3, 2011. Their second child, a son named Kyle Jr., was born on July 30, 2013. LaGrossa Kendrick gave birth to a third child, a daughter named Sloane Danielle, on October 27, 2018. LaGrossa Kendrick became a fitness enthusiast and, in partnership with Survivor: The Amazon contestant Heidi Strobel Hamels, became a co-host and personality for Reality Check Fitness, a health and fitness app.

In 2023, LaGrossa Kendrick and her family resided in Dunedin, Florida. During their marriage and her husband's years in baseball, LaGrossa Kendrick supported his schedule and frequently traveled with him. In a 2023 interview on The Jack Vita Show, she explained that early in their relationship, they agreed she would focus on supporting his career while he was playing, and that once he retired, she would pursue her own opportunities when the time was right. Following Kyle's eventual retirement from professional baseball, and ability to take on more responsibilities at home, LaGrossa Kendrick made the decision to return to reality television.

Stephenie co-hosted weekly recaps of second season of The Traitors on The Jack Vita Show, where she is a frequent contributor.

== Filmography ==
Year	Title	Role	Notes	Ref.
2005	Survivor: Palau	Contestant	7th place	
2005	Survivor: Guatemala	Contestant	Runner-up	
2010	Survivor: Heroes vs. Villains	Contestant	19th place	
2022	Snake in the Grass	Contestant (Snake)	Lost	
2023	The Traitors 1	Contestant (Faithful)	7th place	
2026	Survivor 50: In the Hands of the Fans	Contestant	10th place	

== Notes ==
Preceded by Katie Gallagher	Runner-Up of Survivor; Survivor: Guatemala	Succeeded by Danielle DiLorenzo
