= List of The Traitors (American TV series) contestants =

The following is a list of contestants that have appeared on the American version of The Traitors on Peacock. As of the fifth season, 108 contestants have entered the castle, two of whom; Kate Chastain and Dorinda Medley entered the castle twice.

== Contestants ==
=== The Traitors ===
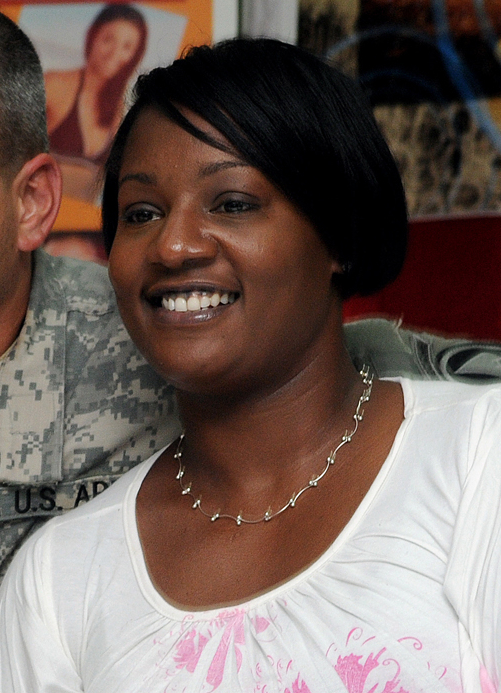
Cirie Fields, winner of The Traitors 1

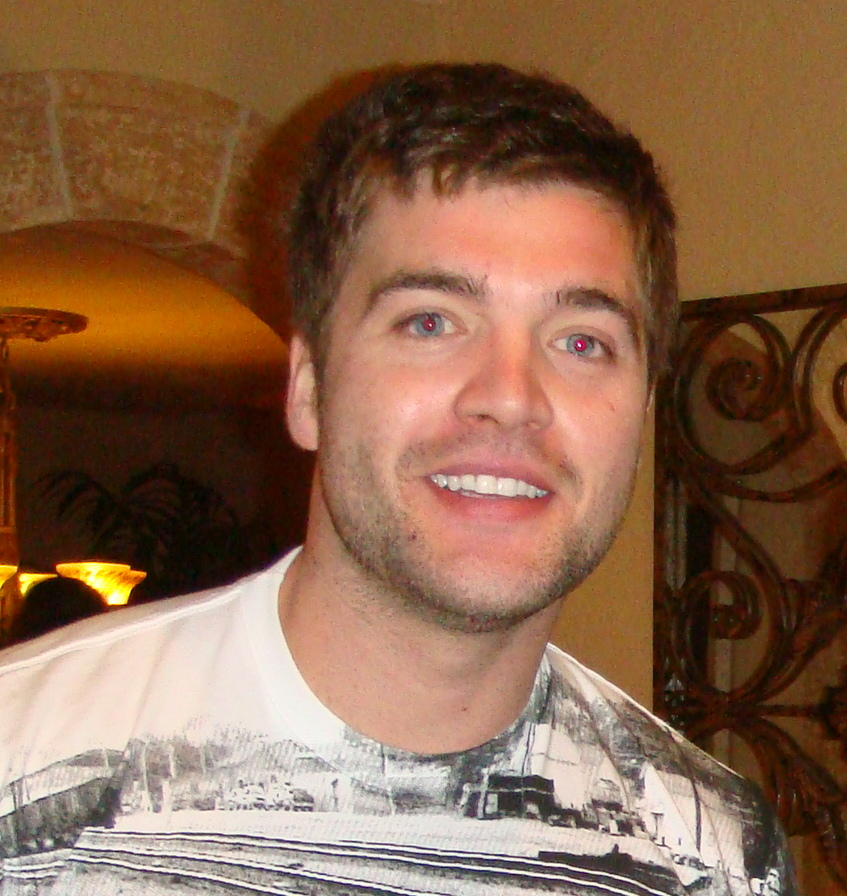
Chris "CT" Tamburello, co-winner of The Traitors 2

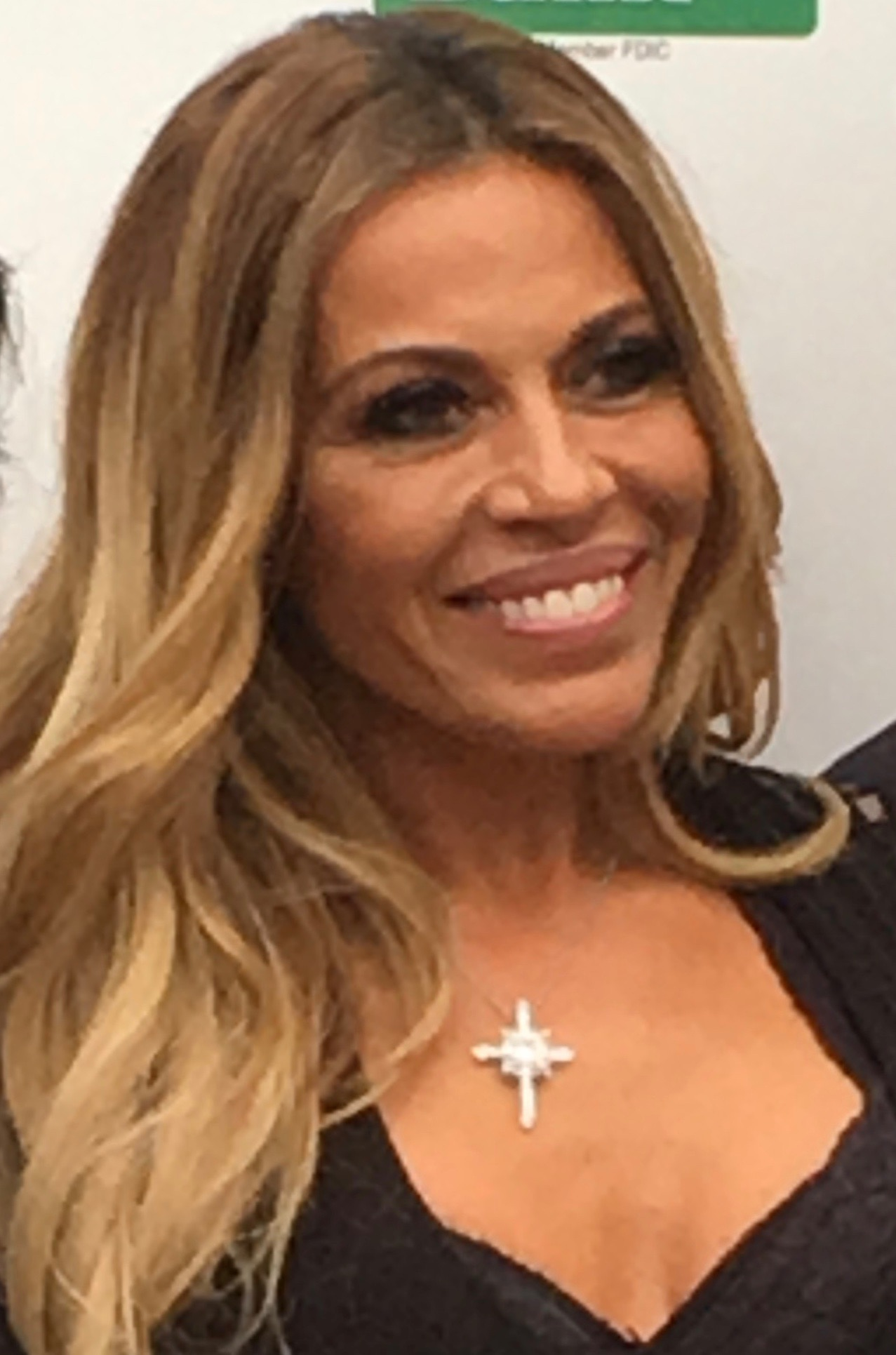
Dolores Catania, co-winner of The Traitors 3

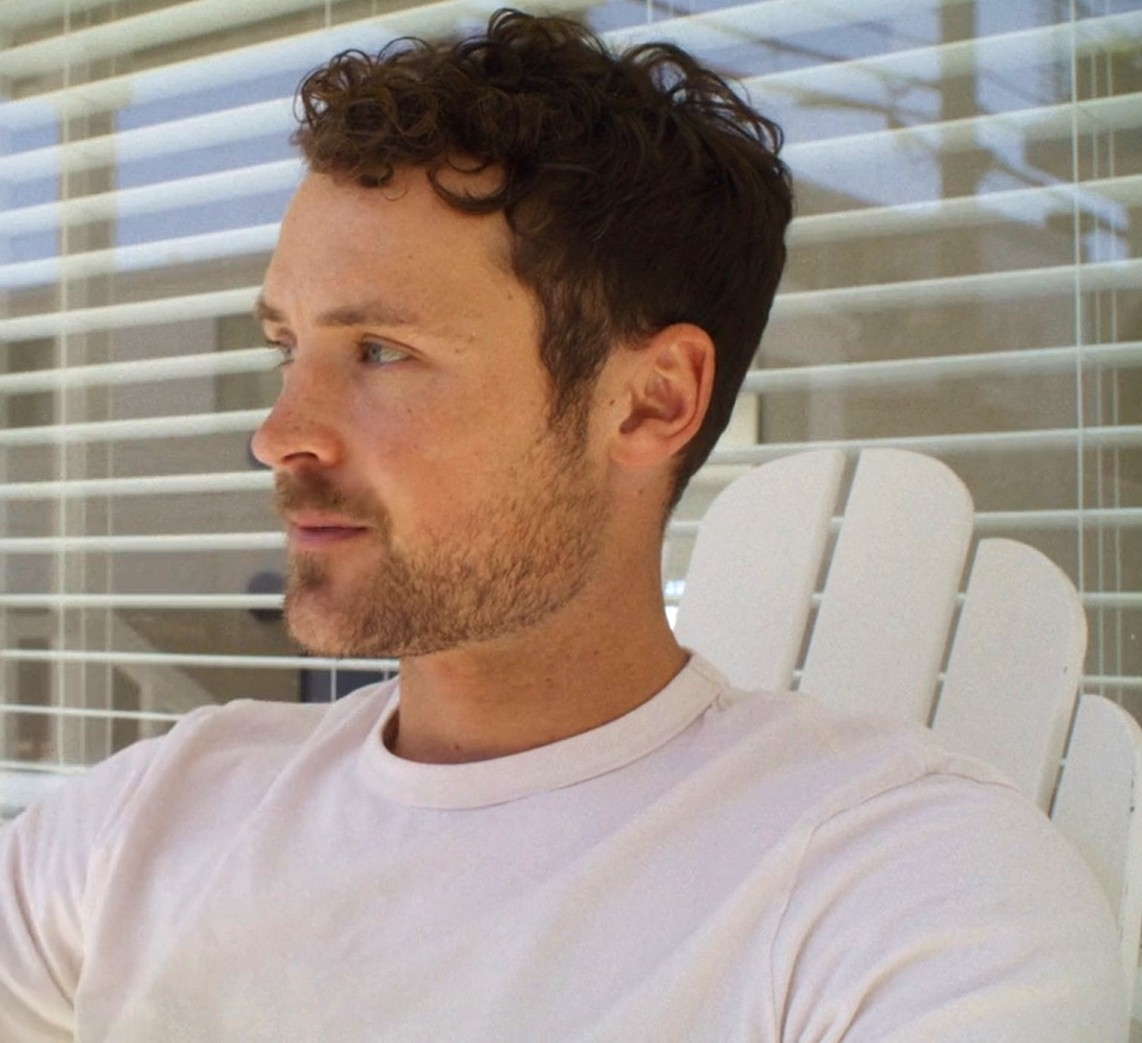
Dylan Efron, co-winner of The Traitors 3

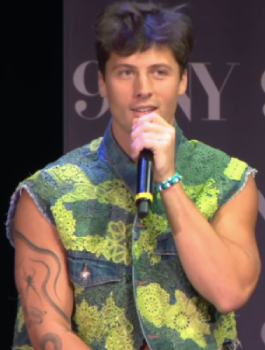
Rob Rausch, winner of The Traitors 4

Key
Winners
Runners-up
Contestant played the game for a second time

Name	Age	From	Occupation/Original series	Season	Status	Finish	Ref.
Reza Farahan	48	Los Angeles, California	Shahs of Sunset	Season 1	Murdered: Episode 1	20th	
Geraldine Moreno	29	North Hollywood, California	Actress	Season 1	Banished: Episode 2	19th	
Robert "Bam" Nieves	33	Rye, New York	Tech sales executive	Season 1	Murdered: Episode 3	18th	
Brandi Glanville	49	Beverly Hills, California	The Real Housewives of Beverly Hills	Season 1	Banished: Episode 3	17th	
Azra Valani	35	Los Angeles, California	Yoga instructor	Season 1	Murdered: Episode 4	16th	
Michael Davidson	35	Oneida, Kentucky	DMV office manager	Season 1	Banished: Episode 4	15th	
Ryan Lochte	37	Gainesville, Florida	Olympic swimming champion	Season 1	Murdered: Episode 5	14th	
Kyle Cooke	39	New York City, New York	Summer House	Season 1	Banished: Episode 5	13th	
Amanda Clark-Stoner	30	Carlisle, Pennsylvania	Emergency room nurse	Season 1	Walked: Episode 5	12th	
Cody Calafiore	32	New York City, New York	Big Brother 16	Season 1	Banished: Episode 6	11th	
Anjelica Conti	28	Staten Island, New York	Hair stylist	Season 1	Murdered: Episode 7	10th	
Shelbe Rodriguez	31	Beaumont, Texas	Public affairs manager	Season 1	Banished: Episode 7	9th	
Rachel Reilly	37	Birmingham, Alabama	Big Brother 12	Season 1	Banished: Episode 8	8th	
Stephenie LaGrossa Kendrick	42	Dunedin, Florida	Survivor: Palau	Season 1	Murdered: Episode 9	7th	
Christian de la Torre	28	Los Angeles, California	Veteran	Season 1	Banished: Episode 9	6th	
Kate Chastain	39	Fort Lauderdale, Florida	Below Deck 2	Season 1	Banished: Episode 10	5th	
Arie Luyendyk Jr.	40	Scottsdale, Arizona	The Bachelorette 8	Season 1	Walked: Episode 10	4th	
Quentin Jiles	32	Houston, Texas	Political analyst	Season 1	Co-runner-up: Episode 10	2nd	
Andie Vanacore	30	Reno, Nevada	Music services director	Season 1	Co-runner-up: Episode 10	2nd	
Cirie Fields	51	Jersey City, New Jersey	Survivor: Panama	Season 1	Winner: Episode 10	1st	
Johnny "Bananas" Devenanzio	41	Fullerton, California	The Real World: Key West	Season 2	Murdered: Episode 2	22nd	
Peppermint	43	New York City, New York	RuPaul's Drag Race 9	Season 2	Banished: Episode 2	21st	
Marcus Jordan	32	Miami, Florida	Fashion entrepreneur	Season 2	Murdered: Episode 3	20th	
Maksim "Maks" Chmerkovskiy	43	Los Angeles, California	Dancing with the Stars 2	Season 2	Banished: Episode 3	19th	
Deontay Wilder	37	Tuscaloosa, Alabama	Professional boxer	Season 2	Walked: Episode 4	18th	
Ekin-Su Cülcüloğlu	29	London, United Kingdom	Love Island UK 8	Season 2	Murdered: Episode 4	17th	
Larsa Pippen	49	Miami, Florida	The Real Housewives of Miami	Season 2	Banished: Episode 4	16th	
Tamra Judge	56	Orange County, California	The Real Housewives of Orange County	Season 2	Murdered: Episode 5	15th	
Janelle Pierzina	43	Lakeville, Minnesota	Big Brother 6	Season 2	Banished: Episode 5	14th	
Dan Gheesling	40	Dearborn, Michigan	Big Brother 10	Season 2	Banished: Episode 6	13th	
Carsten "Bergie" Bergersen	24	Cottage Grove, Minnesota	Love Island USA 5	Season 2	Murdered: Episode 8	12th	
Parvati Shallow	40	Los Angeles, California	Survivor: Cook Islands	Season 2	Banished: Episode 8	11th	
Kevin Kreider	40	Los Angeles, California	Bling Empire	Season 2	Murdered: Episode 9	10th	
Peter Weber	32	Westlake Village, California	The Bachelorette 15	Season 2	Banished: Episode 9	9th	
John Bercow	60	London, United Kingdom	Former Speaker of the House of Commons	Season 2	Murdered: Episode 10	8th	
Phaedra Parks	49	Atlanta, Georgia	The Real Housewives of Atlanta	Season 2	Banished: Episode 10	7th	
Shereé Whitfield	43	Atlanta, Georgia	The Real Housewives of Atlanta	Season 2	Murdered: Episode 11	6th	
Sandra Diaz-Twine	49	Fayetteville, North Carolina	Survivor: Pearl Islands	Season 2	Banished: Episode 11	5th	
Kate Chastain	40	Fort Lauderdale, Florida	Below Deck 2	Season 2	Banished: Episode 11	4th	
Mercedes "MJ" Javid	51	Beverly Hills, California	Shahs of Sunset	Season 2	Banished: Episode 11	3rd	
Trishelle Cannatella	43	New Orleans, Louisiana	The Real World: Las Vegas	Season 2	Co-winner: Episode 11	1st	
Chris "CT" Tamburello	43	Boston, Massachusetts	The Real World: Paris	Season 2	Co-winner: Episode 11	1st	
Dorinda Medley	59	New York City, New York	The Real Housewives of New York City	Season 3	Murdered: Episode 2	23rd	
Wells Adams	40	Los Angeles, California	The Bachelorette 12	Season 3	Banished: Episode 2	22nd	
Chanel Ayan	45	Dubai, United Arab Emirates	The Real Housewives of Dubai	Season 3	Murdered: Episode 3	21st	
Tony Vlachos	50	Allendale, New Jersey	Survivor: Cagayan	Season 3	Banished: Episode 3	20th	
Jeremy Collins	46	Foxborough, Massachusetts	Survivor: San Juan del Sur	Season 3	Murdered: Episode 4	19th	
Bob the Drag Queen	37	New York City, New York	RuPaul's Drag Race 8	Season 3	Banished: Episode 4	18th	
Robyn Dixon	45	Columbia, Maryland	The Real Housewives of Potomac	Season 3	Murdered: Episode 5	17th	
Nikki Garcia	40	Napa, California	Total Divas	Season 3	Banished: Episode 5	16th	
Bob Harper	58	New York City, New York	The Biggest Loser	Season 3	Murdered: Episode 6	15th	
Wes Bergmann	39	Leawood, Kansas	The Real World: Austin	Season 3	Banished: Episode 6	14th	
Derrick Levasseur	40	Providence, Rhode Island	Big Brother 16	Season 3	Murdered: Episode 7	13th	
Rob Mariano	48	Pensacola, Florida	Survivor: Marquesas	Season 3	Banished: Episode 7	12th	
Chrishell Stause	42	Los Angeles, California	Selling Sunset	Season 3	Murdered: Episode 8	11th	
Ciara Miller	28	New York City, New York	Summer House	Season 3	Banished: Episode 8	10th	
Sam Asghari	30	Los Angeles, California	Model / Actor	Season 3	Murdered: Episode 9	9th	
Carolyn Wiger	37	Hugo, Minnesota	Survivor 44	Season 3	Banished: Episode 9	8th	
Tom Sandoval	41	Los Angeles, California	Vanderpump Rules	Season 3	Murdered: Episode 10	7th	
Danielle Reyes	52	San Francisco, California	Big Brother 3	Season 3	Banished: Episode 11	6th	
Britney Haynes	36	Tulsa, Oklahoma	Big Brother 12	Season 3	Banished: Episode 11	5th	
Dolores Catania	53	Edgewater, New Jersey	The Real Housewives of New Jersey	Season 3	Co-winner: Episode 11	1st	
Dylan Efron	32	Manhattan Beach, California	Down to Earth with Zac Efron	Season 3	Co-winner: Episode 11	1st	
Ivar Mountbatten	61	Uffculme, United Kingdom	Aristocrat	Season 3	Co-winner: Episode 11	1st	
Gabby Windey	33	Los Angeles, California	The Bachelor 26	Season 3	Co-winner: Episode 11	1st	
Ian Terry	34	Houston, Texas	Big Brother 14	Season 4	Murdered: Episode 2	23rd	
Porsha Williams	43	Atlanta, Georgia	The Real Housewives of Atlanta	Season 4	Banished: Episode 2	22nd	
Rob Cesternino	46	Wake Forest, North Carolina	Survivor: The Amazon	Season 4	Murdered: Episode 3	21st	
Donna Kelce	72	Orlando, Florida	Mother of Jason and Travis Kelce	Season 4	Banished: Episode 3	20th	
Caroline Stanbury	49	Dubai, United Arab Emirates	Ladies of London	Season 4	Murdered: Episode 4	19th	
Tiffany Mitchell	44	Detroit, Michigan	Big Brother 23	Season 4	Banished: Episode 4	18th	
Monét X Change	35	New York City, New York	RuPaul's Drag Race 10	Season 4	Murdered: Episode 5	17th	
Michael Rapaport	55	Los Angeles, California	Actor / Comedian	Season 4	Banished: Episode 5	16th	
Ron Funches	42	Portland, Oregon	Actor / Comedian	Season 4	Banished: Episode 6	15th	
Yamil "Yam Yam" Arocho	38	San Juan, Puerto Rico	Survivor 44	Season 4	Murdered: Episode 7	14th	
Lisa Rinna	61	Beverly Hills, California	The Real Housewives of Beverly Hills	Season 4	Banished: Episode 7	13th	
Colton Underwood	33	Sherman Oaks, California	The Bachelorette 14	Season 4	Murdered: Episode 8	12th	
Candiace Dillard Bassett	38	Washington, D.C.	The Real Housewives of Potomac	Season 4	Banished: Episode 8	11th	
Dorinda Medley	60	New York, New York	The Real Housewives of New York City	Season 4	Murdered: Episode 9	10th	
Stephen Colletti	39	Los Angeles, California	Laguna Beach: The Real Orange County	Season 4	Banished: Episode 9	9th	
Kristen Kish	41	Austin, Texas	Top Chef: Seattle	Season 4	Murdered: Episode 10	8th	
Natalie Anderson	39	Edgewater, New Jersey	The Amazing Race 21	Season 4	Banished: Episode 10	7th	
Mark Ballas	39	Los Angeles, California	Dancing with the Stars 5	Season 4	Murdered: Episode 11	6th	
Johnny Weir	40	Greenville, Delaware	Olympic figure skater	Season 4	Banished: Episode 11	5th	
Tara Lipinski	43	Los Angeles, California	Olympic figure skater	Season 4	Banished: Episode 11	4th	
Eric Nam	37	Atlanta, Georgia	Musician / Actor	Season 4	Banished: Episode 11	3rd	
Maura Higgins	34	Longford, Ireland	Love Island UK 5	Season 4	Runner-up: Episode 11	2nd	
Rob Rausch	27	Florence, Alabama	Love Island USA 5	Season 4	Winner: Episode 11	1st	

=== The Traitors: New Blood ===
Name	Age	From	Occupation/Original series	Season	Status	Finish	Ref.
Kim Daily	37	Houston, Texas	Lawyer	Season 1	Murdered: Episode 2	22nd	
Madeline Kostopulos	26	San Diego, California	Construction manager	Season 1	Banished: Episode 2	21st	
Xavier Scruggs	38	Wesley Chapel, Florida	MLB analyst	Season 1	Murdered: Episode 3	20th	
Arisa Thomas	36	Los Angeles, California	Dog groomer	Season 1	Banished: Episode 4	19th	
Logan Smith	26	Gatlinburg, Tennessee	Realtor	Season 1	Murdered: Episode 4	18th	
Sherry Kuehl	65	Leawood, Kansas	Writer	Season 1	Banished: Episode 5	17th	
Niyyah Hayes	29	Indianapolis, Indiana	Therapist	Season 1	Murdered: Episode 6	16th	
Michael Foote	38	New York, New York	Lawyer	Season 1	Banished: Episode 6	15th	
Mark Zgoda	26	Phillipsburg, New Jersey	Personal trainer	Season 1	Murdered: Episode 7	14th	
Abby Lee	29	Saint Paul, Minnesota	Astrophysicist	Season 1	Murdered: Episode 8	13th	
Tomica Adams	54	Boston, Massachusetts	Pilot	Season 1	Banished: Episode 8	12th	
Morgan Cook	30	Midland, Michigan	Content creator	Season 1	Murdered: Episode 9	11th	
Joe Vanella	44	Wantagh, New York	Funeral director	Season 1	Banished: Episode 10	10th	
Ben McDonnell	34	Granbury, Texas	Barrel racer	Season 1	Murdered: Episode 10	9th	
Jay Vinnedge	36	Oklahoma City, Oklahoma	Physician	Season 1	Banished: Episode 11	8th	
Clyde Moser	32	Charleston, South Carolina	Teacher	Season 1	Murdered: Episode 11	7th	
Kriste Lewis	52	Hattiesburg, Mississippi	Realtor	Season 1	Banished: Episode 12	6th	
Katie Fites	23	Jacksonville, Florida	Marketing manager	Season 1	Banished: Episode 12	5th	
Victor Vollbrechthausen	26	New York, New York	Business executive	Season 1	Banished: Episode 12	4th	
Abbey Benjamin	37	Mangham, Louisiana	Nurse	Season 1	Co-runner-up: Episode 12	2nd	
Wyatt Gillespie	26	Ligonier, Pennsylvania	Designer	Season 1	Co-runner-up: Episode 12	2nd	
Shane Beatty	32	Staten Island, New York	Ironworker	Season 1	Winner: Episode 12	1st	
