= Penny Mountbatten =

English philanthropist

Lady Ivar Mountbatten
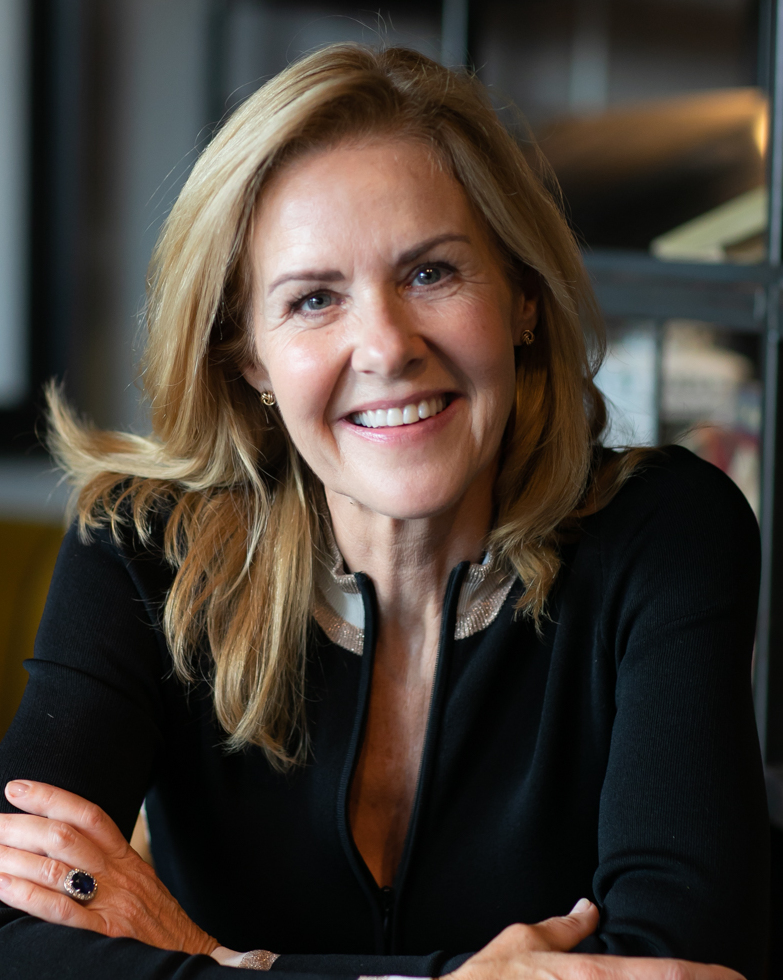
- Mountbatten in 2021
- Born: Penelope Anne Vere Thompson; 17 March 1966 (age 60)
- Noble family: Mountbatten (by marriage)
- Spouse: Lord Ivar Mountbatten (m. 1994; div. 2011)
- Issue: Ella Mountbatten; Alexandra Mountbatten; Louise Mountbatten
- Father: Colin Graham Thompson
- Mother: Rosemary Vere Edwards
- Occupation: philanthropist, businesswoman

Penelope Anne Vere, Lady Ivar Mountbatten (née Thompson; born 17 March 1966), known as Penny Mountbatten, is a British philanthropist and businesswoman. She served as the lady of the manor of Moyns Park and then Bridwell Park until her divorce from Lord Ivar Mountbatten in 2011.

== Biography ==
Mountbatten was born on 17 March 1966 to Colin Graham Thompson and Rosemary Vere Edwards, of Old Manor House, Sutton Veny, Wiltshire. Her parents later divorced and her mother remarried Tim Walker. She was educated at Royal High School, Bath.

On 23 April 1994 she married Lord Ivar Mountbatten, a third cousin-once removed of Elizabeth II, at St Peter and St Paul's Church, Clare in a ceremony attended by Princess Margaret, Countess of Snowdon and Prince Edward. They have three daughters:

- Ella Louise Georgina Mountbatten (born Cambridge, Cambridgeshire, 20 March 1996) – goddaughter of Prince Edward, Duke of Edinburgh
- Alexandra Alix Nada Victoria Mountbatten (born Bridwell Park, Uffculme, Devon, 8 May 1998) – goddaughter of Sophie, Duchess of Edinburgh.
- Louise Luli Xenia Rose Mountbatten (born Bridwell Park, 30 July 2002).

Mountbatten served as lady of the manor of her husband's country estate Moyns Park until 1997, when the couple purchased Bridwell Park. She and her husband separated in September 2010 and divorced amicably in November 2011. Her ex-husband, who came out as homosexual, later married James Coyle. Mountbatten gave her ex-husband away at the wedding.

Mountbatten serves as patron of Leukaemia Care, an organization that promotes cancer research and finding a cure for Leukaemia. She succeeded her ex-husband's first cousin once-removed, Lady Pamela Hicks, as patron. She is the patron of four other charities, including Devon Air Ambulance.

An avid cyclist, Mountbatten would bike to raise money for different charitable causes, including biking at the Great Wall of China.

Mountbatten owns and manages Penny Mountbatten London, a luxury brand representation and event management firm, which has several royal warranted labels.
