= The Traitors: New Blood =

- Genre: Reality; Game show
- Based on: De Verraders by: Marc Pos; Jasper Hoogendoorn
- Presented by: Alan Cumming
- Starring: The Traitors contestants
- Country of origin: United States
- Original language: English
- No. of seasons: 1
- No. of episodes: 12

Production
- Production locations: Ardross, Highland, Scotland
- Camera setup: Multi-camera
- Production company: Studio Lambert

Original release
- Network: NBC
- Release: September 17, 2026 – present

Related
- The Traitors (American TV series); International versions

The Traitors: New Blood is an American television series that is a spin-off of The Traitors. The series was announced on June 18, 2026. The first season premiered on September 17, 2026 on NBC with episodes releasing the next day on Peacock. The first season concluded on November 19, 2026, where Shane Beatty won as a Traitor, while Abbey Benjamin and Wyatt Gillespie placed as the runners-up, as Faithfuls. It was renewed for a second season in 2026.

== Format ==
The show retains a similar format and missions to the The Traitors UK and its US celebrity counterpart. The contestants, all ordinary people from the United States, are invited to the same castle in the Scottish Highlands to play this all-civilian version of the game. They are split into two particular groups: the "Faithful", who are tasked with playing the game and trying to avoid banishment or murder to make it to the end of the game and win the final prize pot, and the "Traitors", a group of contestants secretly selected by host Alan Cumming who work with the Faithful to raise money for the pot but are secretly working to win the prize themselves. Most nights, the Traitors decide who to eliminate from the game via a "murder" while working to remain undetected and avoid suspicion from the other players. On most days, the contestants participate in various missions to add money to the prize fund which can reach a maximum of $250,000.

In this version, there is an additional incentive: for every Traitor that is successfully banished from the game, before the finale, the team will add an additional $15,000 to the prize fund. At the end of each day, the players participate in the Round Table, where they must vote on who to banish from the game in the hope of identifying the Traitors. After each banishment, except for the last one before the endgame, the banished player must reveal their allegiance.

In the endgame, known as the "Fire of Truth", the remaining players must vote on whether to end the game or banish another player. The vote to end the game must be unanimous; any vote otherwise will result in another banishment. If only two players remain, the game ends immediately. If all remaining players are Faithful, the prize money is divided evenly among them. However, if any Traitors remain, they win the entire pot.

== Series overview ==
Series overview
Season	Contestants	Episodes	Originally released			Winner(s)	Runner(s)-up	Prize (out of $250,000)	Traitors
Season	Contestants	Episodes	First released	Last released	Network	Winner(s)	Runner(s)-up	Prize (out of $250,000)	Traitors
1	22	12	September 17, 2026	November 19, 2026	NBC	Shane Beatty (Traitor)	Wyatt Gillespie; Abbey Benjamin (Faithfuls)	$246,300	Joe Vanella Tomica Adams Katie Fites (from ep. 3) Shane Beatty (from ep. 10)

== Season 1 ==
=== Contestants ===
Promotional poster for season one.

Unlike the parent series (which featured celebrities and reality television personalities), this season's cast was composed entirely of civilian participants. Entertainment Weekly announced the 22 cast members on August 12, 2026.

In the first episode, Cumming revealed that two contestants would be recruited as "Accomplices". They would have to complete a series of tasks before the original Traitors would make a final decision on who would join them in the turret.

List of The Traitors contestants
Contestant	Age	Hometown	Occupation	Affiliation	Finish
Kim Daily	37	Houston, Texas	Lawyer	Faithful	Murdered (Episode 2)
Madeline Kostopulos	26	San Diego, California	Construction manager	Faithful	Banished (Episode 2)
Xavier Scruggs	38	Wesley Chapel, Florida	MLB analyst	Accomplice (Note: Katie and Xavier were selected as potential Traitors but had to complete a series of tests before receiving their cloak. Katie was selected to join the Traitors while Xavier was murdered.)	Murdered (Episode 3)
Arisa Thomas	36	Los Angeles, California	Dog groomer	Faithful	Banished (Episode 4)
Logan Smith	26	Gatlinburg, Tennessee	Realtor	Faithful	Murdered (Episode 4)
Sherry Kuehl	65	Leawood, Kansas	Writer	Faithful	Banished (Episode 5)
Niyyah Hayes	29	Indianapolis, Indiana	Therapist	Faithful	Murdered (Episode 6)
Michael Foote	38	New York, New York	Lawyer	Faithful	Banished (Episode 6)
Mark Zgoda	26	Phillipsburg, New Jersey	Personal trainer	Faithful	Murdered (Episode 7)
Abby Lee	29	Saint Paul, Minnesota	Astrophysicist	Faithful	Murdered (Episode 8)
Tomica Adams	54	Boston, Massachusetts	Pilot	Traitor	Banished (Episode 8)
Morgan Cook	30	Midland, Michigan	Content creator	Faithful	Murdered (Episode 9)
Joe Vanella	44	Wantagh, New York	Funeral director	Traitor	Banished (Episode 10)
Ben McDonnell	34	Granbury, Texas	Barrel racer	Faithful	Murdered (Episode 10)
Jay Vinnedge	36	Oklahoma City, Oklahoma	Physician	Faithful	Banished (Episode 11)
Clyde Moser	32	Charleston, South Carolina	Teacher	Faithful	Murdered (Episode 11)
Kriste Lewis	52	Hattiesburg, Mississippi	Realtor	Faithful	Banished (Episode 12)
Katie Fites	23	Jacksonville, Florida	Marketing manager	Traitor	Banished (Episode 12)
Victor Vollbrechthausen	26	New York, New York	Business executive	Faithful	Banished (Episode 12)
Abbey Benjamin	37	Mangham, Louisiana	Nurse	Faithful	Runner-up (Episode 12)
Wyatt Gillespie	26	Ligonier, Pennsylvania	Designer	Faithful	Runner-up (Episode 12)
Shane Beatty	32	Staten Island, New York	Ironworker	Traitor (Note: Shane was recruited as a Traitor in Episode 10 following an ultimatum.)	Winner (Episode 12)

=== Episodes ===
The Traitors: New Blood episodes
No. overall	No. in season	Title	Original release date
1	1	"A New Dawn Is Rising"	September 17, 2026
2	2	"I'm a Sweaty Boy"	September 17, 2026
3	3	"The Traitors Are Watching"	September 24, 2026
4	4	"The Death Parade"	September 24, 2026
5	5	"Wake of the Living Dead"	October 8, 2026
6	6	"A Murder of Necessity"	October 15, 2026
7	7	"It's Like Fighting Two Pigs Under a Blanket"	October 22, 2026
8	8	"A Bad Apple Spoils the Whole Bunch"	October 29, 2026
9	9	"Playing Chess"	November 5, 2026
10	10	"The Sun, the Moon and the Truth"	November 12, 2026
11	11	"I'm Fighting Till the End"	November 19, 2026
12	12	"Who Do You Truly Trust?"	November 19, 2026

=== Elimination history ===
Key
The contestant was a Faithful
The contestant was a Traitor
The contestant was an Accomplice
The contestant was ineligible to vote

Episode	1	2	3/4		5	6	7	8	9	10/11		11
Traitors' decision	Katie; Xavier	Kim	Katie	Xavier	Logan	Niyyah (Note: After the fourth Round Table, the Traitors were tasked to murder someone in plain sight, by having their victim catch a "poisoned" apple. Joe was successful to have a player, Niyyah, to catch it. The victim's identity was revealed in episode 6. The following morning, the players were told that the victim's identity would be revealed at the end of the "Wake".)	Mark	Abby L.	Morgan (Note: After the seventh Round Table, the Traitors were tasked to murder someone by poisoning one chalice following dinner. The contestants then had one minute to discuss and decide to keep their cup or trade with another player. If a Traitor were to drink the poisoned chalice, no one would be murdered. The Traitors were successful in poisoning a Faithful, Morgan.)	Shane	Ben	Clyde
Traitors' decision	Deem Accomplice	Murder	Recruit	Murder						Ultimatum (Note: Following Joe's banishment, Katie was offered the chance to meet a Faithful face-to-face and offer them an ultimatum: become a Traitor or be Murdered. She picked Shane, who accepted the offer.)	Murder	
Shield	Abby L.; Madeline; Victor	None	Clyde		Abbey B.; Ben; Jay; Katie; Michael; Shane; Wyatt (Note: In episode 4, during the mission, the contestants had to leave others behind causing those players to be shortlisted for possible murder. These players finished the mission without being shortlisted.)	None			Victor	Abbey B.; Jay; Wyatt		None
Banishment	None	Madeline	Arisa		Sherry	Michael	~~Victor~~ (Note: The winner of the mission, Shane, gained the ability to choose whether the banishment stands or whether he would remain. At the beginning of episode 8, Shane chose to pardon Victor.)	Tomica	Joe	Jay		Kriste
Vote	None	13–7–1	13–5–1		11–5–1	8–3–3–1	5–3–2– 1–1–1	10–2	6–3–1	7–1		4–2
Shane	No; Vote	Madeline	Victor		Jay	Michael	Victor	Tomica	Kriste	Jay		Kriste
Abbey B.	No; Vote	Madeline	Arisa		Sherry	Michael	Victor	Tomica	Joe	Jay		Kriste
Wyatt	No; Vote	Victor	Arisa		Sherry	Michael	Tomica	Tomica	Joe	Jay		Kriste
Victor	No; Vote	Kriste	Arisa		Michael	Tomica	Tomica	Tomica	Joe	Jay		Kriste
Katie	No; Vote	Victor	Arisa		Sherry	Michael	Tomica	Tomica	Wyatt	Jay		Victor
Kriste	No; Vote	Madeline	Arisa		Jay	Wyatt	Abby L.	Tomica	Wyatt	Jay		Victor
Clyde	No; Vote	Victor	Arisa		Sherry	Michael	Morgan	Tomica	Joe	Jay		Murdered (Episode 11)
Jay	No; Vote	Madeline	Victor		Sherry	Victor	Victor	Victor	Joe	Victor		Banished (Episode 11)
Ben	No; Vote	Victor	Arisa		Sherry	Michael	Katie	Tomica	Joe	Murdered (Episode 10)		
Joe	No; Vote	Victor	Victor		Sherry	Wyatt	Victor	Tomica	Wyatt	Banished (Episode 10)		
Morgan	No; Vote	Madeline	Victor		Sherry	Michael	Wyatt	Tomica	Murdered (Episode 9)			
Tomica	No; Vote	Madeline	Victor		Sherry	Victor	Victor	Victor	Banished (Episode 8)			
Abby L.	No; Vote	Madeline	Arisa		Sherry	Wyatt	Wyatt	Murdered (Episode 8)				
Mark	No; Vote	Madeline	Arisa		Jay	Michael	Murdered (Episode 7)					
Michael	No; Vote	Victor	Arisa		Sherry	Victor	Banished (Episode 6)					
Niyyah	No; Vote	Madeline	Arisa		Jay	Murdered (Episode 6)						
Sherry	No; Vote	Madeline	Arisa		Jay	Banished (Episode 5)						
Logan	No; Vote	Madeline	Arisa		Murdered (Episode 4)							
Arisa	No; Vote	Madeline	Michael		Banished (Episode 4)							
Xavier	No; Vote	Madeline	Murdered (Episode 3)									
Madeline	No; Vote	Victor	Banished (Episode 2)									
Kim	No; Vote	Murdered (Episode 2)										

==== End Game ====
Episode	12					
Decision	Banish	Katie	Banish	Victor	End Game	Game Over; Traitor Win
Vote	5–0	4–1	2–2	3–1	3–0	Game Over; Traitor Win
Shane	Banish	Katie	End Game	Victor	End Game	Winner
Abbey B.	Banish	Katie	Banish	Victor	End Game	Runners-up
Wyatt	Banish	Katie	Banish	Victor	End Game	Runners-up
Victor	Banish	Katie	End Game	Wyatt	Banished	
Katie	Banish	Victor	Banished			

=== Missions ===
Episode	Title	Time Limit	Money available	Money earned	Total pot	Shield winner
1	"A New Dawn is Rising"	25 minutes	$50,000	$50,000	$50,000	Abby L.
1	"A New Dawn is Rising"	25 minutes	$50,000	$50,000	$50,000	Madeline
1	"A New Dawn is Rising"	25 minutes	$50,000	$50,000	$50,000	Victor
The competitors are tasked with finding treasure chests on a ship in a time limit. Once the time ended, the ship would explode. The treasure chests could only be opened by clues around the ship.
3	"The Traitors Are Watching"	30 minutes	$30,000	$15,000	$65,000	Clyde
The competitors are tasked with running through the grounds to three crypt locations. With a battering ram, they would open the crypts. They would then have to decide who to send in, depending on what the crypt said. At each crypt, only two players could enter. While the first crypt held no shield, the second crypt held a shield while the third held information pertaining to the traitors.
4	"The Death Parade"	N/A	$24,000	$12,000	$77,000	Abbey B.
4	"The Death Parade"	N/A	$24,000	$12,000	$77,000	Ben
4	"The Death Parade"	N/A	$24,000	$12,000	$77,000	Jay
4	"The Death Parade"	N/A	$24,000	$12,000	$77,000	Katie
4	"The Death Parade"	N/A	$24,000	$12,000	$77,000	Michael
4	"The Death Parade"	N/A	$24,000	$12,000	$77,000	Shane
4	"The Death Parade"	N/A	$24,000	$12,000	$77,000	Wyatt
The competitors are tasked with taking barrels of gold up the hill without being caught by the death parade. Upon reaching the end, they must set a fire barrier which would stop the parade in its path. Those the parade catches would be up for a shortlist for murder. The first gate forced them to leave four players behind; those four are caught by the death parade. The second gate forced them to leave two players behind. The third gate forced them to leave four players behind.
6	"A Murder of Necessity"	30 minutes	$20,000	$20,000	$97,000	—N/a
The competitors are split into two teams for two different tasks. One team is inside going to see and listen to screams of former murdered contestants. The other team have to listen to graves screams to see if it matches what the other team has heard. Each correct answer adds $5,000 to the pot. The screams include Maura Higgins, Bob the Drag Queen, Phaedra Parks and Boston Rob.
7	"It's Like Fighting Two Pigs Under a Blanket"	15 minutes	Unknown	$15,300	$112,300	—N/a
The competitors must rip through the scare crows for money bags. They will not know what is in the bag and will place in with their named scarecrow. Players have the opportunity to sabotage other players if they come across a black heart and place it in the bin of another player. Whoever they sabotage retains the money, but will not be eligible to gain an advantage for the round table and is out of the challenge. The players sabotaged were Victor, Morgan, Wyatt and Katie. In episode 8, it is revealed that Shane banked the most money so he won the challenge.
9	"Playing Chess"	N/A	Unknown	$18,000	$145,300 (Note: $15,000 was added to the pot following Tomica's banishment in episode 8)	Victor
Players must guess what a spirit's last wish is from a code. Each right answer gives them money towards the prize pot. While they are trying to solve the clue, they are distracted by things going around in the cabin. For each wrong answer, the player is removed from the cabin and they do not win the money. There is also an option for a shield.
10	"The Sun, the Moon and the Truth"	Not shown	$26,000	$26,000	$186,300 (Note: $15,000 was added to the pot following Joe's banishment in episode 10)	Jay
10	"The Sun, the Moon and the Truth"	Not shown	$26,000	$26,000	$186,300	Wyatt
10	"The Sun, the Moon and the Truth"	Not shown	$26,000	$26,000	$186,300	Abbey
Players must race to build shields while being sabotaged by traitors. Whoever builds the shield first will be shielded from murder. Players who have completed shields, must also remain having full shields by the end of the challenge.
11	"I'm Fighting Till the End"	60 minutes	$60,000	$60,000	$246,300	—N/a
The players are split into two teams: one with four, the other with two. The team of four would be on the ground while the other two would be in a helicopter. The team in the air would be pointing out the bunkers, while the team on the ground must try to find all the money. The team in the sky is Katie and Abbey B.

== Production ==
Promotional poster for season 1

Similar to the previous seasons, this season was primarily filmed in Ardross Castle in the Scottish Highlands.

On June 9, 2026, Scottish newspaper The Press and Journal announced that filming had begun in late May. USA Today visited the cast on June 5. Cumming was photographed near a cafe on June 8.
