= Ekin-Su Cülcüloğlu =

English actress and reality television personality (born 1994)

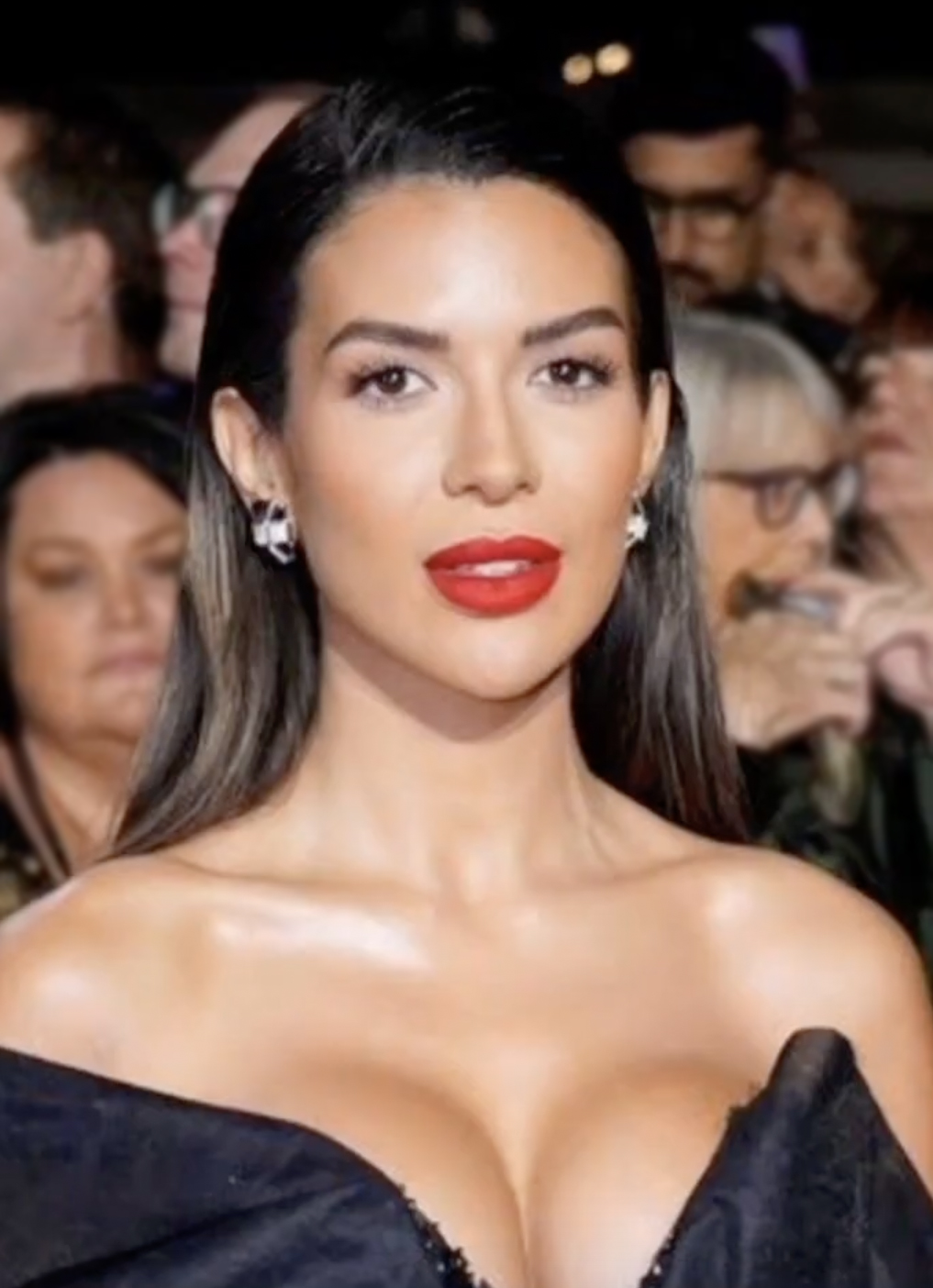
- Cülcüloğlu in 2022
- Born: 21 August 1994 (age 32); Islington, London, England
- Education: Epping Forest College
- Alma mater: University of Central Lancashire
- Occupations: Television personality; actress; model
- Television: Kuzey Yıldızı İlk Aşk; Love Island; Dancing on Ice; The Traitors US; Celebrity Big Brother; Love Island: All Stars; Cooking with the Stars; Inside: USA

Ekin-Su Cülcüloğlu (Turkish pronunciation: [e.cin.su dʒyl.dʒy.ɫoo.ɫu]; born 21 August 1994) is a British-born Turkish reality television personality, actress and model.

Born in Islington, she competed in various beauty pageants before going on to study performing arts at the University of Central Lancashire. After starring in the Turkish soap opera Kuzey Yıldızı İlk Aşk (2020), she won the eighth series of the ITV2 reality series Love Island (2022), along with Davide Sanclimenti. Following her win, she appeared on Dancing on Ice (2023), The Wheel (2023), The Traitors US (2024), Celebrity Big Brother (2024), Love Island: All Stars (2025), Cooking with the Stars (2025) and Inside: USA (2025).

In 2022, she became a brand ambassador to fashion retailer Oh Polly and makeup brand BPerfect Cosmetics.

== Early life ==
Cülcüloğlu was born on 21 August 1994 to Turkish parents in Islington, London. She moved to Loughton, Essex at the age of 10.

== Career ==
In 2011, Cülcüloğlu competed in Miss Asia Pacific World, representing Ireland. She competed in various other beauty pageants before going on to study performing arts at the University of Central Lancashire, graduating in 2015. At the beginning of her career, Cülcüloğlu went by the stage names Susie Hayzel, Su Hayzel and Su Ekin Cülcüloğlu.

In 2019, Cülcüloğlu appeared as a jury member on the Turkish iteration of singing competition All Together Now. Also on the jury was Turkish singer Seçil Gür with whom Cülcüloğlu released a single in 2018. In 2020, she returned for the show's second season. Also in 2020, Cülcüloğlu was cast in the Turkish television series Kuzey Yıldızı İlk Aşk, in which she portrayed Işıl, a photographer from London who saves the life of leading character Kuzey (İsmail Demirci). She also portrayed a serial killer in a Turkish soap opera.

In June 2022, Cülcüloğlu became a contestant on the eighth series of the reality dating show Love Island on ITV2. She entered the villa as a "bombshell" on Day 3 and won the series. Following her victory, she starred in a travel series with fellow winner Davide Sanclimenti on ITV2. Cülcüloğlu claimed she was offered the job of hosting Love Island after Laura Whitmore's departure, however this was debunked as false. She was in talks to become a Loose Women panelist. In September 2022, she signed a deal with fashion retailer Oh Polly to be their brand ambassador, walking for them at New York Fashion Week. She also signed a deal with makeup brand BPerfect Cosmetics to become their brand ambassador. The following month, it was announced that Cülcüloğlu would compete in the fifteenth series of Dancing on Ice in 2023. She was paired with Brendyn Hatfield. She was eliminated in Week 4. Cülcüloğlu was a celebrity expert (beauty) on The Wheel on 7 October 2023.

In 2023, Cülcüloğlu took part in a debate at the University of Oxford, speaking out in favour of the positive impact of influencers in society. She debated against Mark-Francis Vandelli; Lord Parkinson; and Sophia Smith Galer.

In 2024, Cülcüloğlu competed on the second season of the American version of The Traitors on Peacock. She was eliminated in episode 4. In March, she entered the Celebrity Big Brother house, taking part in the twenty-third series, and was the fourth housemate to be evicted. Multiple Ofcom complaints were made after Cülcüloğlu clashed with hosts and panelists during her post-eviction interview on Big Brother: Late & Live. Unlike other evicted housemates, she did not return for the live final. After her eviction, Lorraine Kelly claimed Cülcüloğlu had pulled out of a scheduled appearance on her show, Lorraine, at the last minute, however this was proven to be false. In August of that year Cülcüloğlu released her first book, Be Your Own Best Friend: And other lessons from a life in and out of the limelight, described as an "honest, unapologetic, and occasionally outrageous, guide to life."

In 2025, Cülcüloğlu entered the Love Island: All Stars villa as the first bombshell of the series. She coupled up with Curtis Pritchard and eventually finished in 3rd place. Following her exit, Cülcüloğlu walked the runway for fashion brand Helen Anthony at their London Fashion Week presentation. In August 2025, Cülcüloğlu starred in series five of Cooking with the Stars, with chef Poppy O'Toole as her mentor. She was the second contestant eliminated, finishing in 7th place. That same year, Cülcüloğlu was announced as a contestant on the American iteration of Inside, a reality show created by British YouTube group Sidemen for Netflix. She eventually finished in 6th place.

In 2026, Cülcüloğlu made a guest appearance on season 3 of American reality series Vanderpump Villa. She also joined the cast of podcaster Alex Cooper's reality series Unwell Winter Games on YouTube. Additionally, Cülcüloğlu is set to make a guest appearance in the upcoming season of fashion programme Project Runway.

Cülcüloğlu has appeared on the covers of Women's Health, Grazia, Alem and Blush magazine. Additionally, she has appeared on the cover of The Sun's Fabulous magazine four times, and on the covers of The Guardian's Saturday magazine and Daily Mail Weekend. Cülcüloğlu was the cover star for Vogue México y Latinoamérica's September 2025 issue.

== Personal life ==
Cülcüloğlu splits her time between Essex and Istanbul. Her hobbies include ice skating, reading, walking, and going to the gym.

In 2023, relatives of Cülcüloğlu were caught up in the 2023 Turkey–Syria earthquakes. Cülcüloğlu urged members of the public to help relief efforts following the earthquake. She donated money to the British Red Cross and took part in an appeal video for the organisation. She has since become an ambassador for the organisation. In 2025, Cülcüloğlu participated in a trek for breast cancer charity CoppaFeel! with actress Giovanna Fletcher and more than 100 other women, raising over £500,000 for the charity. In September 2025, Cülcüloğlu spoke at a United Nations panel on Creativity, Innovation & Next-Gen Leadership alongside global figures in philanthropy, finance and the arts.

In June 2023, Cülcüloğlu and fellow Love Island winner Davide Sanclimenti split up. They got back together in the same year before breaking up for a second time in January 2024. In January 2025, Cülcüloğlu and fellow Love Island: All Stars contestant Curtis Pritchard confirmed they were a couple. However, by 28 May that year, she announced on her Instagram that they had separated. In May 2026, Cülcüloğlu confirmed she was in a relationship with Christopher East, founder of a dog food brand.

== Filmography ==
Key
†	Denotes films that have not yet been released

Television

Year	Title	Role	Notes	Ref.
2019–2020	Benimle Söyle	Herself (jury member)	Two seasons; 26 episodes	
2020	Kuzey Yıldızı İlk Aşk	Işıl	Regular role; 7 episodes	
2022	Love Island	Contestant	Series 8 winner	
2022	Ekin-Su & Davide: Homecomings	Herself	Main role; 2 episodes	
2023	Dancing on Ice	Contestant	Series 15, 9th place	
2023	The Wheel	Celebrity expert	1 episode	
2023	Celebrity Antiques Road Trip	Guest	1 episode	
2024	The Traitors US	Contestant	Season 2, 17th place	
2024	The Weakest Link	Contestant	1 episode	
2024	Celebrity Big Brother	Contestant	Series 23, 9th place	
2024	What Happens When	Guest	1 episode	
2025	Love Island: All Stars	Contestant	Series 2, 3rd Place	
2025	Michael McIntyre's Big Show	Guest	Series 8, Episode 5	
2025	Cooking with the Stars	Contestant	Series 5, 7th place	
2025	Inside: USA	Contestant	Series 1, 6th place	
2026	Unwell Winter Games	Contestant	YouTube series; 4 episodes	
2026	Vanderpump Villa	Guest	Season 3	
2026	Project Runway	Guest	Season 22	

Guest appearance

Loose Women, 1 episode (08/08/2022)

The Big Breakfast, 1 episode (13/08/2022)

Lorraine, 4 episodes (15/08/2022, 09/09/2024, 21/02/2025 & 24/06/2025)

This Morning, 1 episode (05/09/2022)

Good Morning Britain, 4 episodes (25/11/2022, 09/05/2023, 08/06/2023 & 01/08/2025)

Love Island: Aftersun, 1 episode (Series 9, Episode 7)

Watch What Happens Live with Andy Cohen, 1 episode (27/09/2024)

Ireland AM, 3 episodes (03/09/2022, 04/04/2023 & 08/08/2025)

The 6 O'Clock Show, 1 episode (12/08/2025)

== Discography ==
Under the name "Su", Cülcüloğlu was featured on and appeared in the music video for the single "Yeniden Başlasın" by Turkish artist Seçil Gür.

Title	Year	Artists	Album	Ref.
"Yeniden Başlasın"	2018	Seçil Gür feat. Su	Non-album single	

== Bibliography ==
- Be Your Own Best Friend: And other lessons from a life in and out of the limelight (2024) ISBN 978-0-349-44007-1
