= Moyns Park =

Grade I listed Elizabethan country house

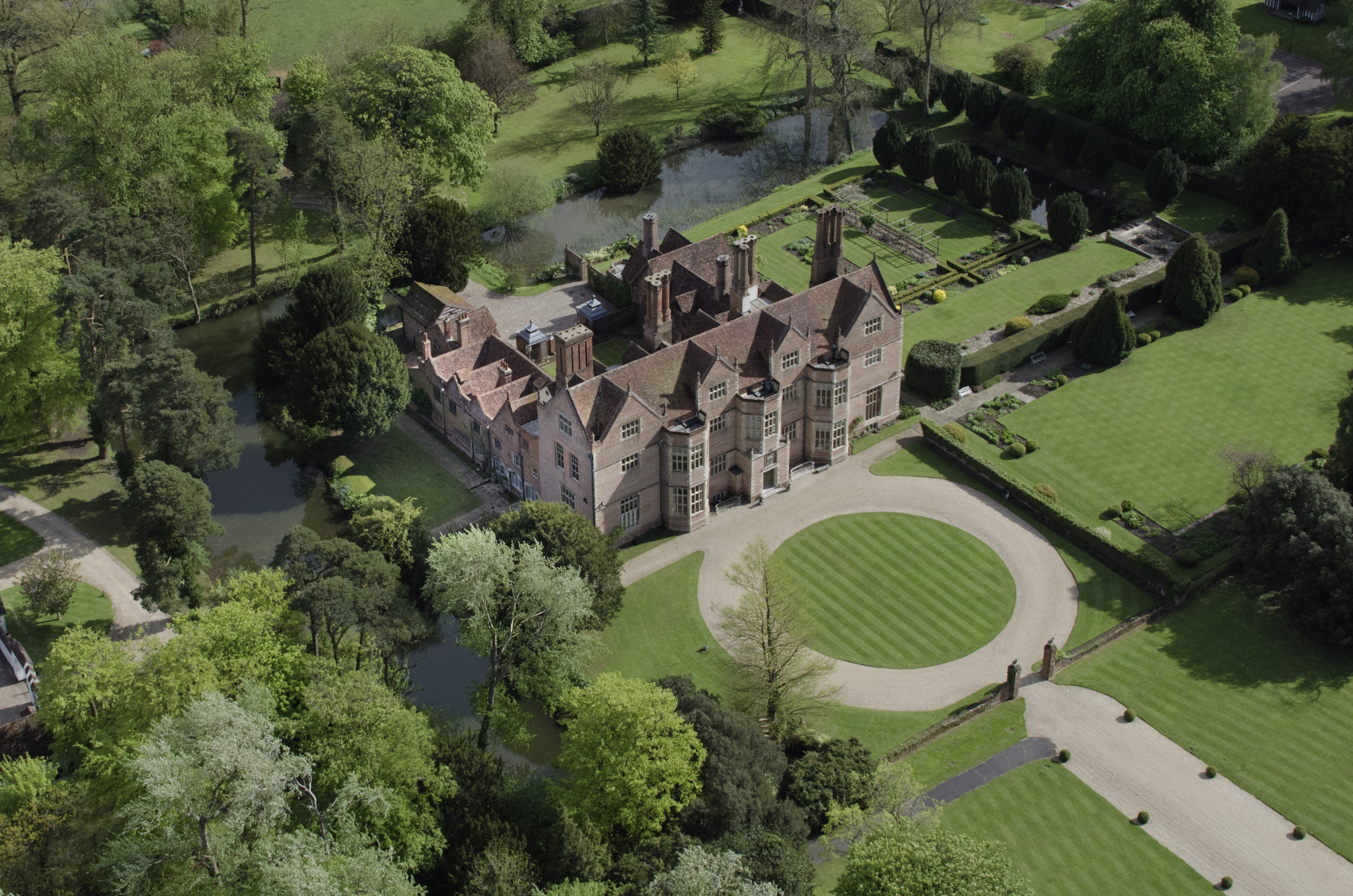
- Moyns Park aerial image

Additional information
Location within Essex
52°02′17″N 0°28′08″E
Type	Country house
Location	Steeple Bumpstead, Essex
Site notes
Architectural styles	Tudor and Elizabethan
Listed Building – Grade I
Official name	Moyns Park
Designated	7 August 1952
Reference no.	1338363

Moyns Park is a Grade I listed country house in Steeple Bumpstead, Essex.

== History ==
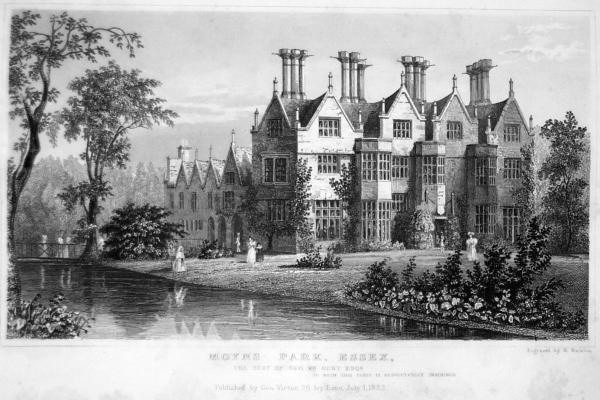
Engraving of Moyns Park, Essex, by Thomas Wright, in his History of Essex, published 1831

The home of the Gent family, until the late 19th century, was once owned by Major-General Cecil Robert St John Ives, maternal grandfather of Ivar Bryce, the next owner. Bryce was a close friend of the author Ian Fleming, who stayed at the house in the summer of 1956. When Bryce's wife, Josephine Hartford, an A&P heiress and sister of Huntington Hartford, died in 1992, she left the estate to Lord Ivar Mountbatten and George Mountbatten, 4th Marquess of Milford Haven. Ivar Bryce's first cousin Janet Mercedes Bryce had been married to David Mountbatten and was the mother of Ivar and George Mountbatten. Lord Ivar Mountbatten lived in the house with his wife, Penelope Thompson, before selling it in 1997. It is said that Fleming made final changes to his novel From Russia, with Love in the house. The house was also the location for several Hammer Horror films. The house was also used as a residential Riding School in and around 1949, with courses in dressage, show jumping and short B.H.S courses. The chief instructor was C. Coombs MBE.

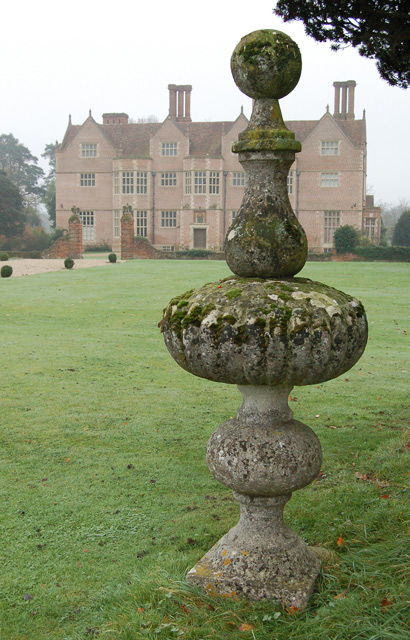
The house today

The area in the Le Moynes once had lands that encompassed Hedingham Castle and other villages over a swathe of Essex. The Gents held their first court at Moyns in the early 16th century and the estate grew and continued to do so under Sir Thomas Gent (Queen Elizabeth's Baron of the Exchequer, Sergeant-at-Law and later judge).

According to an article in The Essex Countryside of May 1965 by GC Harper, the house was once moated, and takes its name from its first owner who had it built, Robert de Fitzwilliam le Moigne in the early 14th century, but little but the SW wing remains from the 15th century. It remained in that family for 200 years, then passed by marriage to William Gent. His son Thomas became MP for Maldon in 1571 and a 'trusted assistant' to Sir Francis Walsingham, Elizabeth 1's Secretary of State and spymaster, whence he rose to 2nd Baron of the Exchequer. He sat in judgement at the trial of the conspirators of the Babington Plot to assassinate the Queen and replace her with Mary Queen of Scots. His wealth and status led him to rebuild the west front, completed by his son Henry, as he died in 1593.

Thomas signed a petition to Walsingham requesting he write to the governors of the Dutch congregation in Colchester and demand that 20–30 families return to Halstead to resume the cloth trade there, but to no avail. George Gent (d. 1818) was a magistrate for more than 60 years. The right to appoint the headmaster of the school in Steeple Bumpstead belonged until c.1835 to the owner of Moyns. The Moyns occupancy ceased in 1879 when it was sold to Major General Cecil Robert St John Ives, whose grandson John Bryce occupied it in the 1960s. The gardens of the 200-acre (81 ha) estate had yew topiary, and the paths were said to be planted to a plan by Lord Bacon, with a bowling green being one of the oldest.
