= Kate Chastain =

American television personality

- Born: Kathryn Dorothy Chastain; January 2, 1983 (age 43); Melbourne Beach, Florida, U.S.
- Education: University of Central Florida
- Occupations: Chief stewardess; tv personality; podcaster; author
- Television: Below Deck; The Traitors 1; The Traitors 2; House of Villains 3

Kathryn Dorothy Chastain (born January 2, 1983) is an American chief stewardess, television personality, author and podcaster. She is best known for her role as Chief Stewardess on the Bravo reality series Below Deck, on which she appeared from 2014 to 2020, becoming one of the franchise's most prominent cast members. Following her success on Below Deck, Chastain competed on the first and second seasons of The Traitors in the United States, and the third season of House of Villains.

== Early life and education ==
Kathryn Dorothy Chastain was born on January 2, 1983 in Melbourne Beach, Florida, United States.

She grew up in Florida and later moved for her education, graduating from El Camino Fundamental High School in Sacramento, California, California. Chastain attended the University of Central Florida, where she studied communications and developed an interest in hospitality and customer service. After graduating, she began working in the yachting industry, starting as a laundry stewardess and rising through the ranks to become a chief stewardess on luxury yachts, experience that later led to her casting on the reality television series Below Deck.

== Television ==
Chastain first rose to prominence on the Bravo reality series Below Deck, which chronicles the professional and personal lives of crew members aboard luxury charter yachts. She joined the show in its second season in 2014 as the chief stewardess, becoming one of the franchise's most recognisable cast members due to her sharp wit, leadership role, and candid confessionals. Over six seasons on the series, Chastain worked closely with multiple crews and captains, solidifying her status as a fan favourite before departing the show after its seventh season in 2020 to pursue land-based projects and broader media opportunities.

Chastain expanded her reality television career by competing on the American version of Peacock's reality game show The Traitors, joining the show's first season in 2023. In the series, a group of contestants work together to complete challenges while a hidden subset of "traitors" secretly work against the rest. In Season 1, Chastain played as a Faithful and finished in fifth place, gaining attention for her strategic gameplay and outspoken personality. She returned for the second season as a mid-season intruder, where she was later recruited as a Traitor and remained in the game until being banished at the endgame. In 2026, Chastain joined the cast of House of Villains season 3, a reality competition series hosted by Joel McHale in which well-known reality TV personalities compete in a series of challenges for a cash prize and the title of "America’s Ultimate Supervillain". Chastain placed third on the show.

In addition to her starring roles on reality competition series, Chastain has appeared in several other television programmes and projects, often as herself or as a host/commentator. Chastain served as the host and executive producer of the Bravo digital talk series Bravo's Chat Room in 2020, where she discussed Bravo franchise news and interviewed various personalities from the network's reality shows. She also appeared on Bravo's companion show Below Deck Galley Talk, providing commentary and analysis alongside other cast members. In 2023, Chastain co-hosted the series Couch Talk with Captain Lee and Kate with her former Below Deck costar Captain Lee Rosbach, where the duo broke down highlights and moments from Bravo programming. She has also been featured as herself on special programmes such as BravoCon Live with Andy Cohen! and made guest appearances on talk shows including Watch What Happens Live with Andy Cohen. Additionally, Chastain appeared on the television special The Traitors: Postmortem in 2024, a companion discussion series to The Traitors, where she offered insights on gameplay and behind-the-scenes moments.

== Personal life ==
Chastain previously resided in Fort Lauderdale, Florida, during her time working in the yachting industry. In 2016, Chastain was in a relationship with Rocío Hernández.

Chastain has a son whom she is raising as a single mother. She has publicly shared aspects of her parenting journey, including milestones such as his first steps. In early 2025, she revealed that Sullivan had begun school.

Chastain has also been involved in philanthropic efforts, including founding the nonprofit organisation Genesis Boutique, which provides professional clothing to women re-entering the workforce.

== Filmography ==
=== Television ===
Year(s)	Title	Role	Notes
2014–2020	Below Deck	Herself (Chief Stewardess)	96 episodes
2015–2024	Watch What Happens Live with Andy Cohen	Guest	19 episodes
2020–2021	Bravo's Chat Room	Host	28 episodes
2021–2023	Below Deck Galley Talk	Herself	46 episodes
2021	For Real: The Story of Reality TV	Herself	1 episode
2023	Couch Talk With Captain Lee and Kate	Herself (Co-host)	10 episodes
2023	Project Runway	Guest Judge	Season 20, 1 episode; Below Decked Out
2023–2025	The Traitors	Contestant Herself	5th place, season 1; 11 episodes 4th place, season 2; 8 episodes Guest, season 3; 2 episodes
2024	The Traitors: Postmortem	Herself	5 episodes
2024	Below Deck Mediterranean	Herself	1 episode
2025	The Real Housewives of Potomac	Herself	1 episode
2026	House of Villains	Contestant	3rd place
