= Dylan Efron =

American influencer (born 1992)

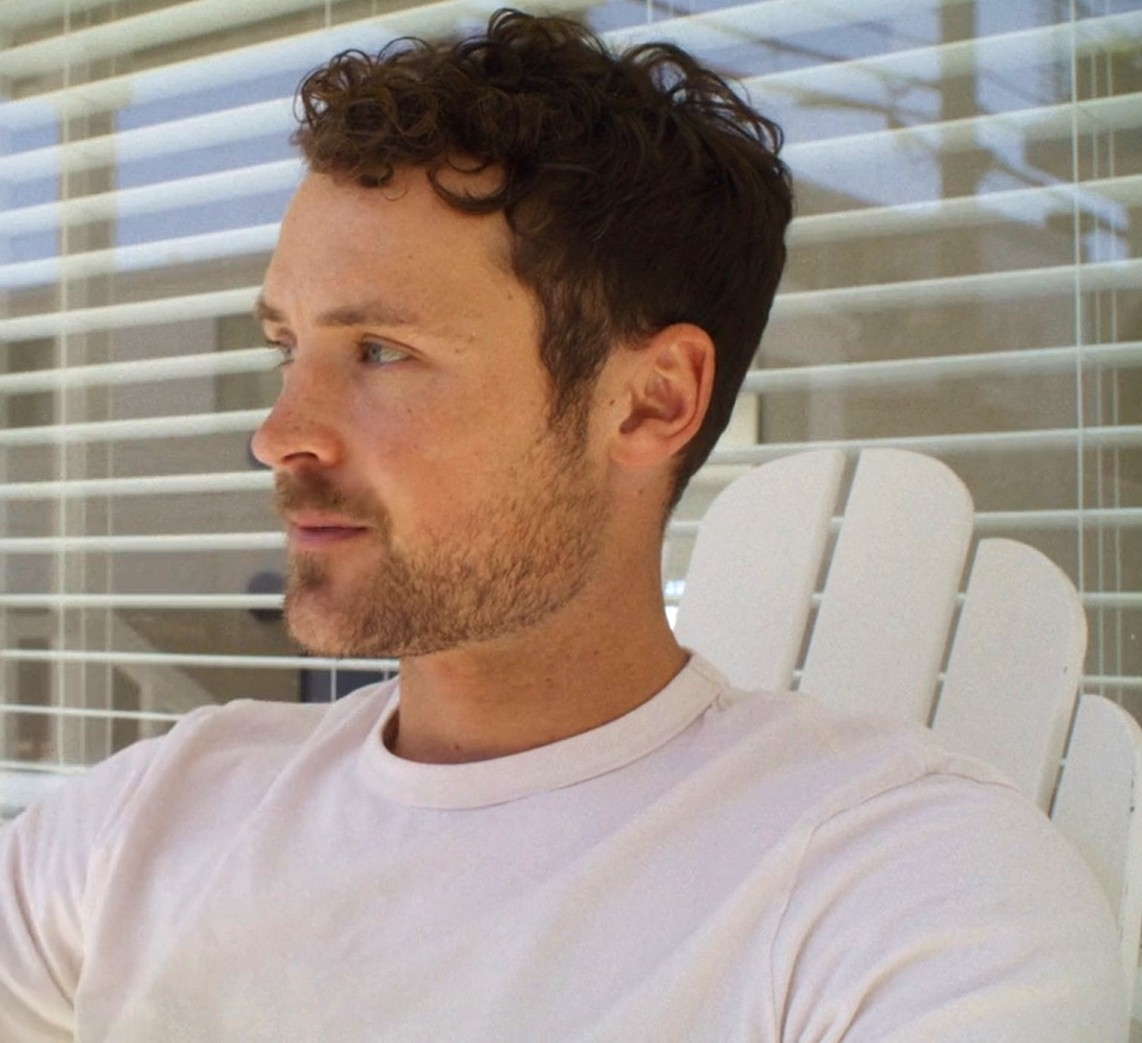
- Efron in 2025
- Born: Nicholas Dylan Harrison Efron; February 6, 1992 (age 34); San Luis Obispo, California, U.S.
- Education: California Polytechnic State University
- Occupations: Television personality; producer
- Relatives: Zac Efron (brother)

Nicholas Dylan Harrison Efron (born February 6, 1992) is an American television personality and production coordinator. He is the younger brother of actor Zac Efron.

== Early life ==
Efron was born on February 6, 1992 in San Luis Obispo, California. He was named after singer Bob Dylan. In addition to his older brother Zac, he has a younger sister and brother. He attended the California Polytechnic State University and graduated in 2013, where he earned his bachelor of science degree in economics.

== Career ==
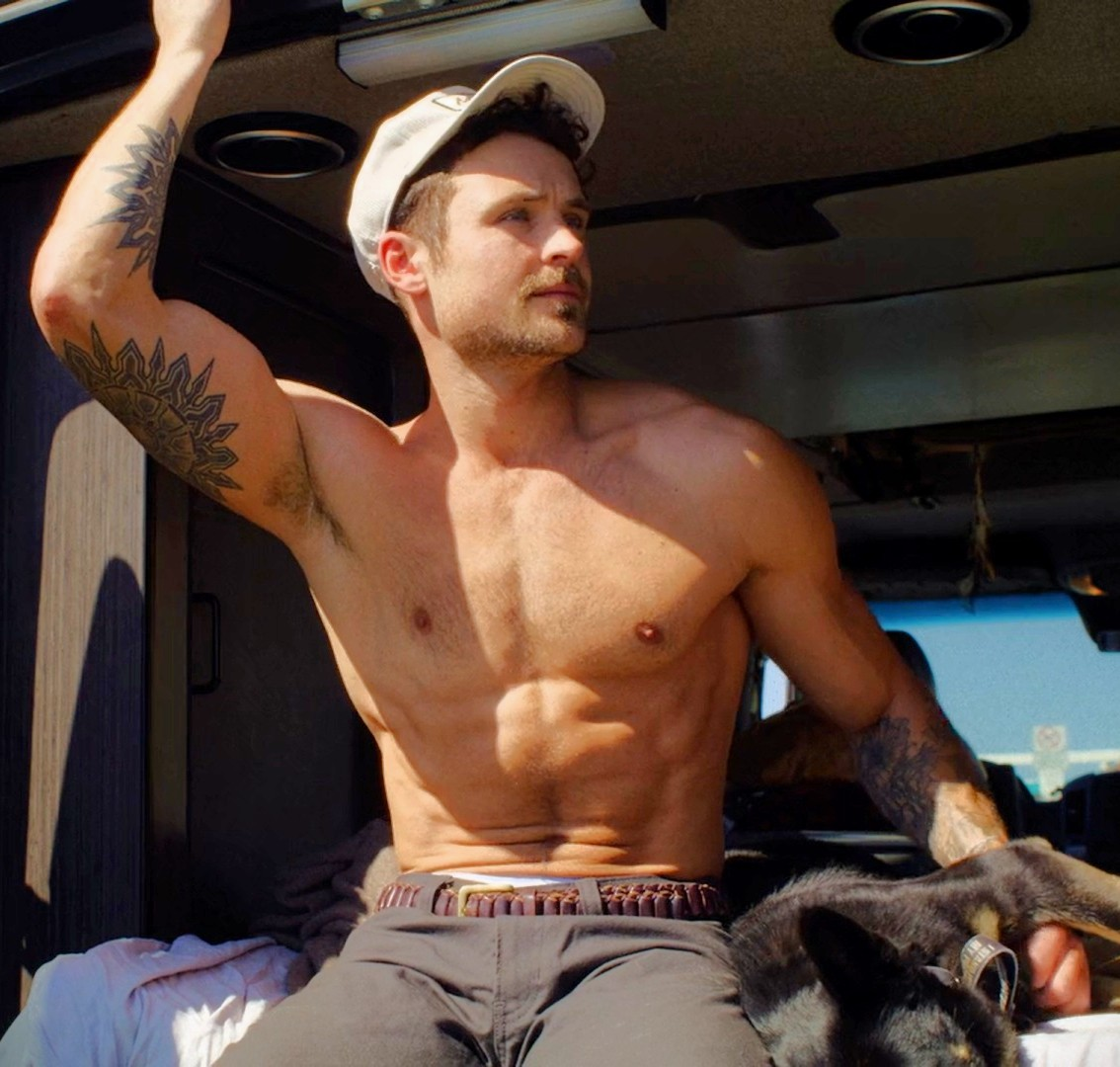
Efron, with dog, in 2025

Efron is a social media influencer on Instagram. As a production coordinator, he has worked on films such as Ready Player One, The Accountant, Live by Night, and American Sniper. He served as a producer of the Daytime Emmy Award-winning Down to Earth with Zac Efron, a travel documentary starring his brother. Since 2019, Efron has featured in Off the Grid, a series hosted on his brother's YouTube channel following the pair as they participate in outdoor activities and trips without electronic devices.

On June 5, 2024, it was announced that Efron would be a contestant on Peacock's third season of The Traitors. The season premiered in January 2025. Dylan, along with Lord Ivar Mountbatten, Dolores Catania, and Gabby Windey were declared winners as Faithfuls. On September 3, 2025, Efron was announced as a competitor on season 34 of ABC's Dancing with the Stars. Efron was partnered with Daniella Karagach for the competition and placed fourth in the season finale. In 2026, he starred in the music video of "Wish I Didn't" by country singer Megan Moroney.

== Personal life ==
Efron has been in a relationship with Courtney King, his high school sweetheart, since at least 2016.

== Filmography ==
Year	Title	Role	Notes	Ref.
2025	The Traitors	Contestant	Winner; season 3	
2025	Dancing with the Stars	Contestant	Fourth place; Season 34	
2025	The Voice	Co-Host	Finale preshow; Season 28	
