= Lord Ivar Mountbatten =

British noble (born 1963)

- Born: Ivar Alexander Michael Mountbatten; 9 March 1963 (age 63); London, England
- Noble family: Mountbatten
- Spouses: Penelope Anne Vere Thompson (m. 1994; div. 2011) James Coyle (m. 2018)
- Issue: Ella Mountbatten; Alexandra Mountbatten; Louise Mountbatten
- Father: David Mountbatten, 3rd Marquess of Milford Haven
- Mother: Janet Mercedes Bryce

Lord Ivar Alexander Michael Mountbatten (born 9 March 1963) is a British aristocrat, farmer, geologist, businessman, and reality television personality. A second cousin of King Charles III, he is the first member of the extended royal family to be openly in a same-sex relationship, and in 2018 became the first to have a same-sex wedding, marrying airline cabin services director James Coyle. He is a former director of SCL Group, the parent company of the now-defunct data analytics firm Cambridge Analytica.

== Early life and family ==
Ivar Alexander Michael Mountbatten was born on 9 March 1963 in London, England, the second son of David Mountbatten, 3rd Marquess of Milford Haven, and the former Janet Mercedes Bryce. His elder brother is George Mountbatten, 4th Marquess of Milford Haven. Queen Victoria was his great-great-great-grandmother, and he is a descendant of Alexander Pushkin and Abram Gannibal. He is also a second cousin of King Charles III through their respective fathers. His paternal grandfather was Prince George of Battenberg, through whom he is a morganatic descendant of the House of Hesse-Darmstadt. Mountbatten grew up at Moyns Park in Essex.

Mountbatten was educated at Gordonstoun School, attended by Prince Philip and Charles III, and graduated from Middlebury College in Vermont with a BA degree in geology.

In a June 2022 interview with Tatler, Mountbatten commented on the 1930s Gloria Vanderbilt child custody trial, where a maid made an allegation of a lesbian affair between the child's mother, Gloria Morgan Vanderbilt, and the Marchioness of Milford Haven, Mountbatten's grandmother. He stated she was a lesbian.

== Career ==
Mountbatten began his career as a geologist and spent significant time working in South America during his early career. Starting in 1995, he became involved in business pursuits, including serving as director of the UK subsidiary of DMX Music and working with Coldharbour Mill Working Wool Museum. He was later involved with SCL Group, the parent company of Cambridge Analytica. In 2009, Mountbatten was appointed Deputy Lieutenant of Devon.

In 2019, he began a career in reality television by starring in the 6th series of Treasure Island with Bear Grylls. He also appeared on Keeping up with the Aristocrats on ITV in 2022.

In October 2024, Mountbatten was announced as part of the third season of the American reality competition series The Traitors, which premiered on 9 January 2025. He was one of the season's Faithful winners, along with Dolores Catania, Dylan Efron, and Gabby Windey.

== Personal life ==
Mountbatten married Penelope Anne Vere Thompson (born Salisbury, Wiltshire, 17 March 1966), only daughter of Colin Graham Thompson of Old Manor House, Sutton Veny, Wiltshire, and Rosemary Vere Edwardes. The ceremony took place on 23 April 1994 at the Church of Saint Peter and Saint Paul in Clare, Suffolk. They have three daughters

- Ella Louise Georgina Mountbatten (born Cambridge, Cambridgeshire, 20 March 1996), married insurance broker Fergus Wright in September 2026; goddaughter of Prince Edward, Duke of Edinburgh.
- Alexandra 'Alix' Nada Victoria Mountbatten (born Bridwell Park, Uffculme, Devon, 8 May 1998), goddaughter of Sophie, Duchess of Edinburgh.
- Louise 'Luli' Xenia Rose Mountbatten (born Bridwell Park, 30 July 2002).

The couple divorced in 2011.

In September 2016, Mountbatten revealed that he was in a relationship with James Coyle, an airline cabin services director whom he met while at a ski resort in Verbier. On 22 September 2018, they were married in a private ceremony at Bridwell Park. Mountbatten's former wife walked him down the aisle and "gave him away" at the suggestion of their daughters.

Mountbatten is a godparent of Lady Louise Mountbatten-Windsor (born 2003), the daughter of Prince Edward and Sophie.

Mountbatten inherited Moyns Park in 1992 along with his brother, but in 1997 moved to Bridwell Park in Uffculme, Devon. Following his divorce, in 2015 he converted Bridwell Park into a venue for weddings, corporate functions, and business events, and in 2024 he sold the property.

Lines of succession
Preceded by Albie Dru	Succession to the British throne descended from Alice, daughter of Victoria	Succeeded by Ella Mountbatten
