= The Traitors (American TV series) season 2 =

The Traitors
- Season 2
- Promotional poster
- Presented by: Alan Cumming
- No. of contestants: 22
- Winners: Chris "CT" Tamburello; Trishelle Cannatella
- Runner-up: Mercedes "MJ" Javid
- Location: Ardross Castle, Scottish Highlands
- No. of episodes: 12

Release
- Original network: Peacock
- Original release: January 12 – March 7, 2024

Season chronology
- ← Previous; Season 1 Next → Season 3

The second season of the American television series The Traitors was announced on September 21, 2023. The first three episodes premiered on Peacock on January 12, 2024. The season concluded on March 7, 2024 where Chris "CT" Tamburello and Trishelle Cannatella won as Faithfuls, while Mercedes "MJ" Javid placed as a runner-up, also as a faithful.

== Format ==
The show retained the same format and challenges as the The Traitors UK. The arrived contestants at the castle are referred to as the "Faithful," and among them are the "Traitors," a group of contestants secretly selected by the host, Alan Cumming. Each night, the Traitors would decide who to "murder," and that same contestant would leave the game. After the end of each day, where the contestants participated in various challenges to add money to the prize fund, they would participate in the Round Table, where they must decide who to banish from the game, trying to identify the Traitor.

If all the remaining players are Faithful, then the prize money is divided evenly among them. However, if any Traitors remain, they win the entire pot.

== Contestants ==
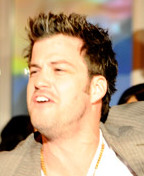
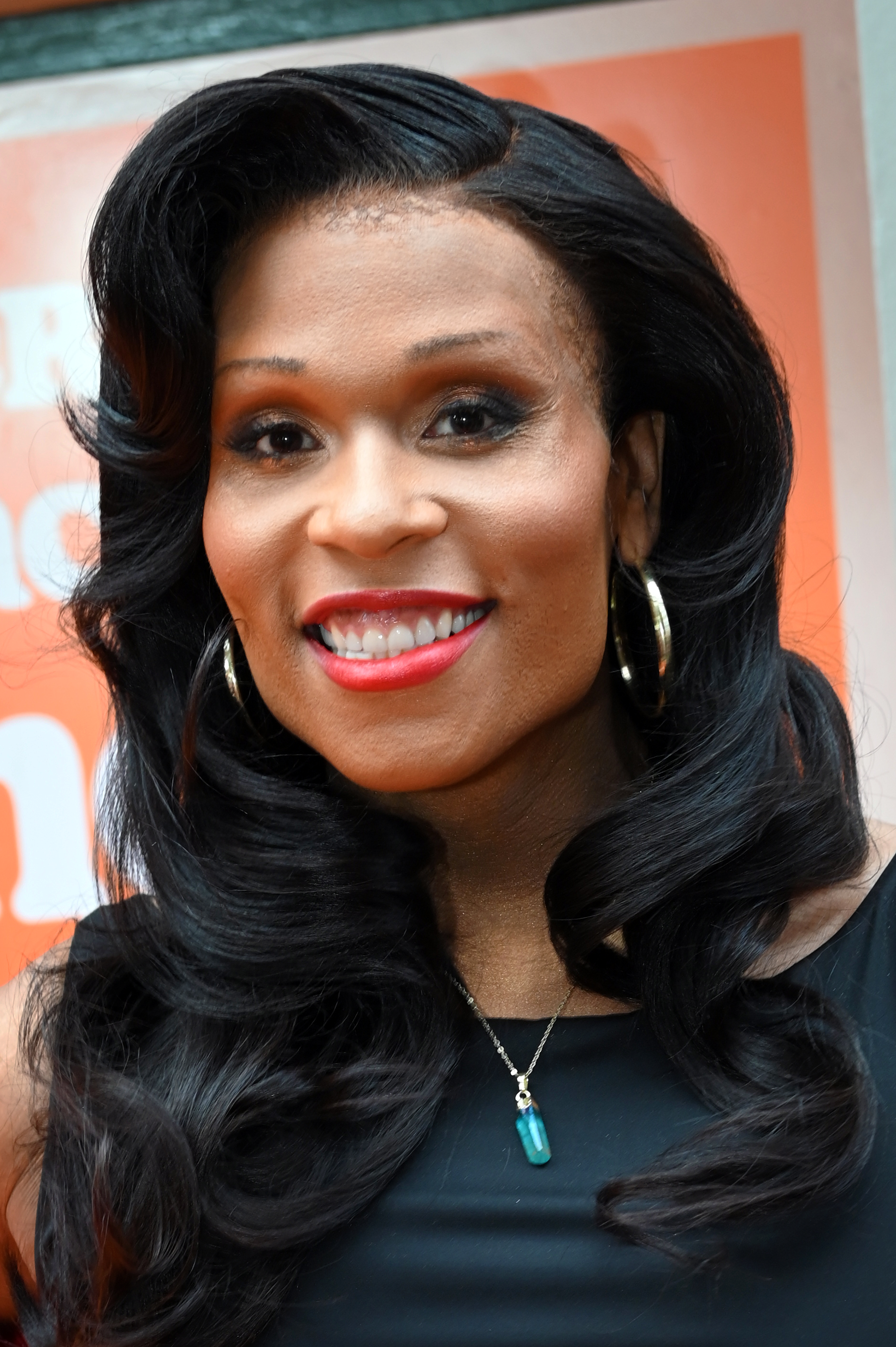
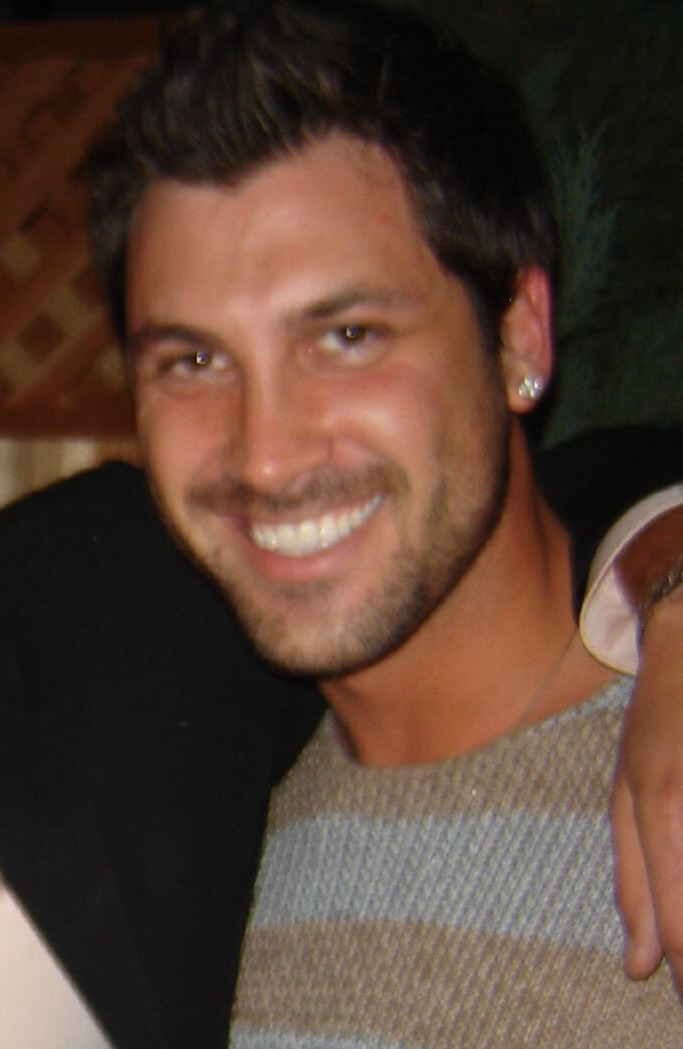
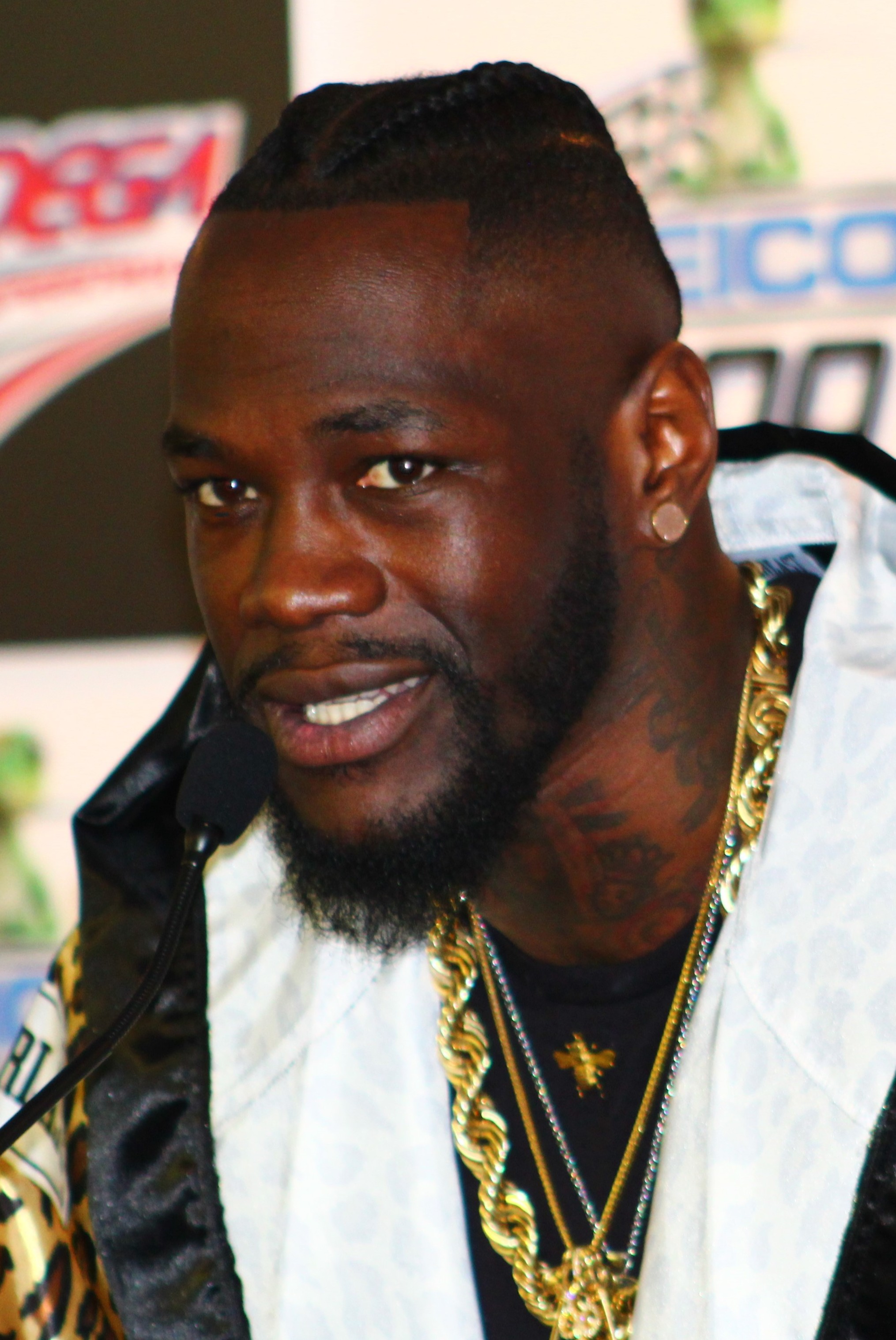
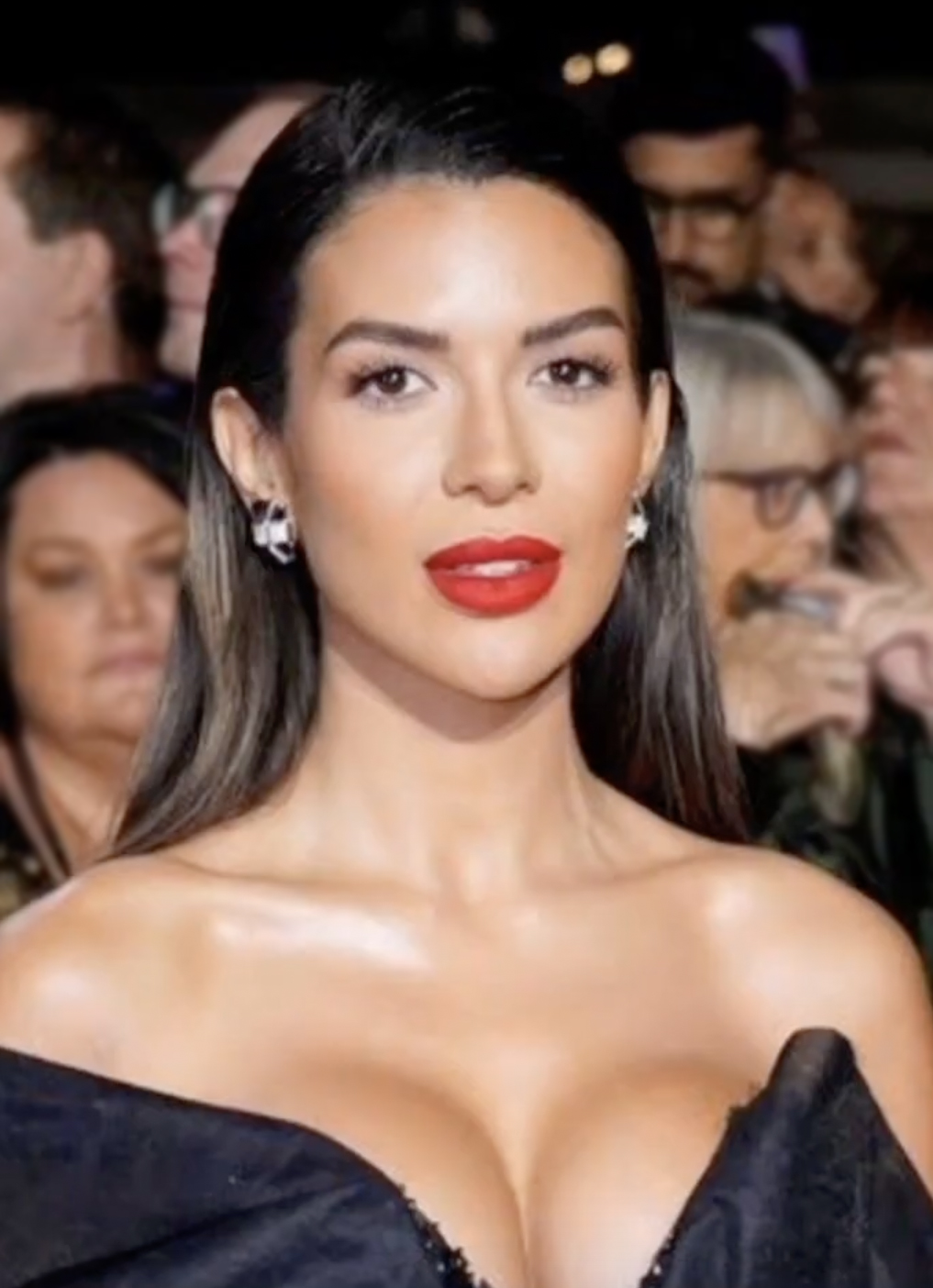
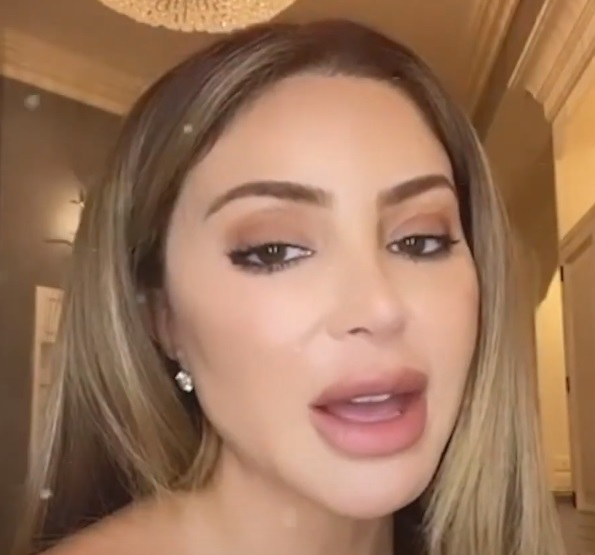
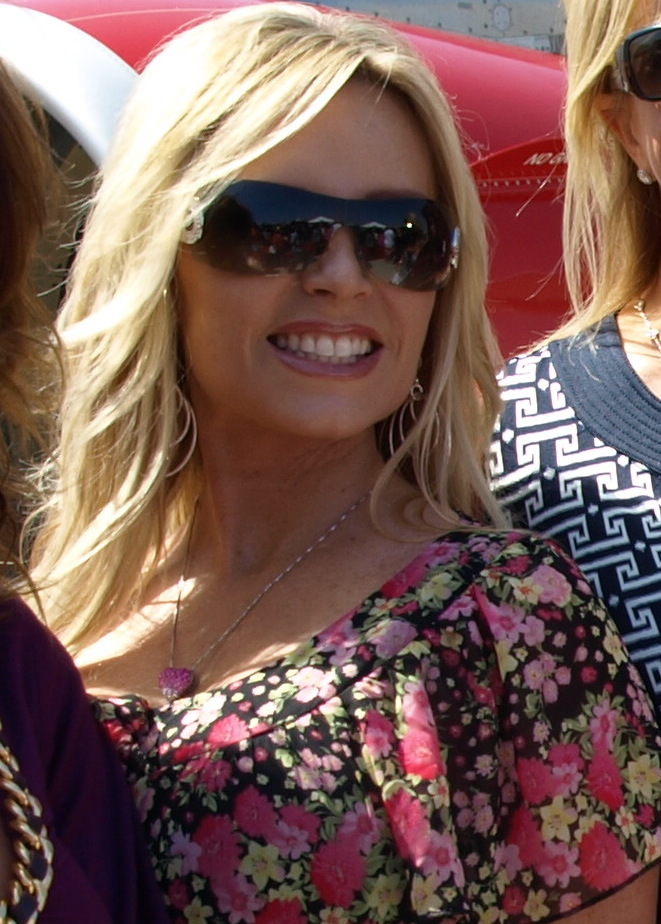
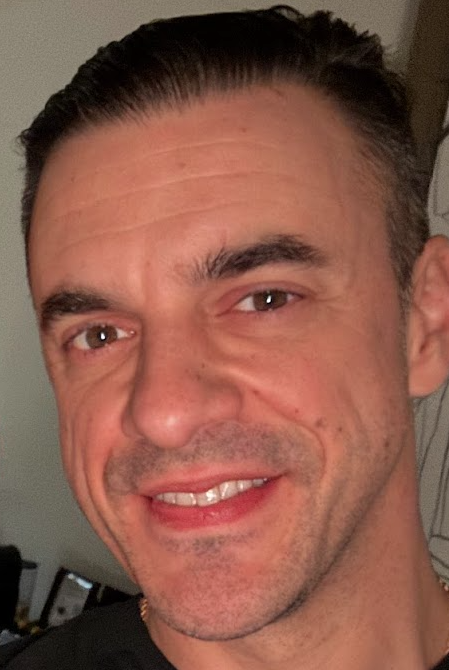
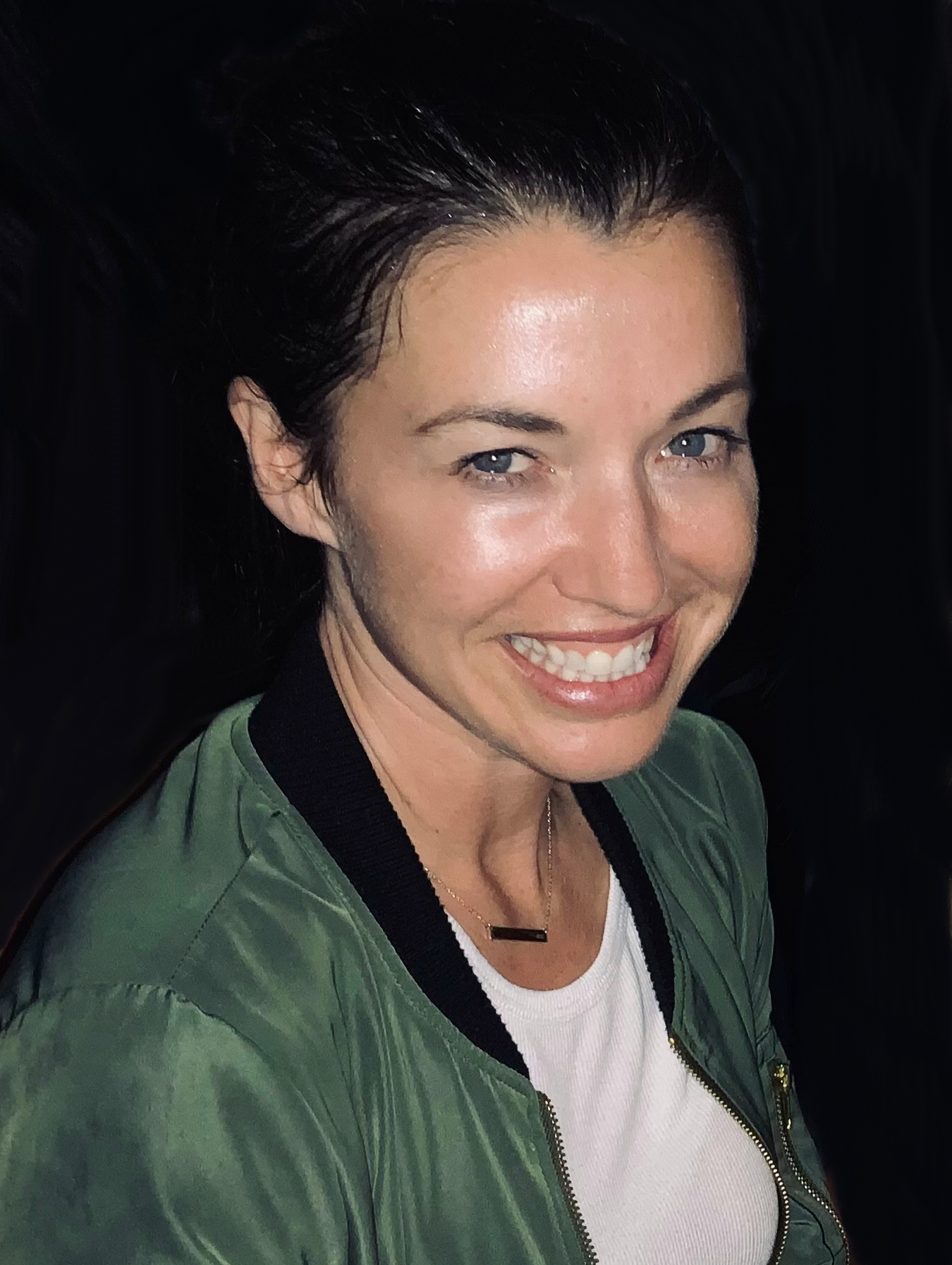
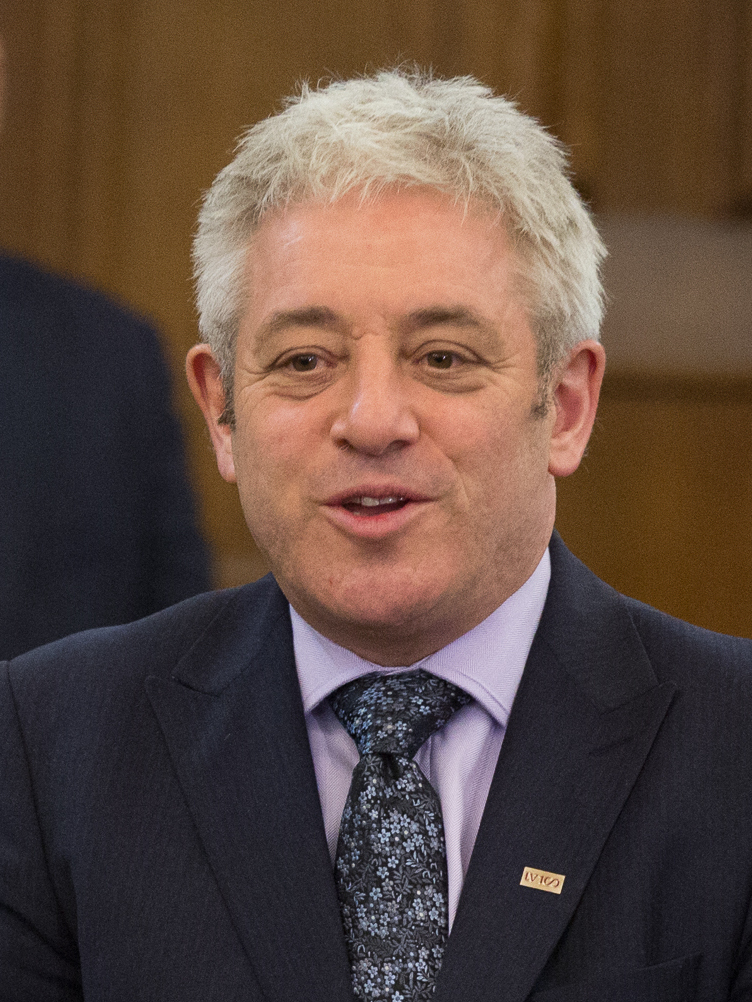
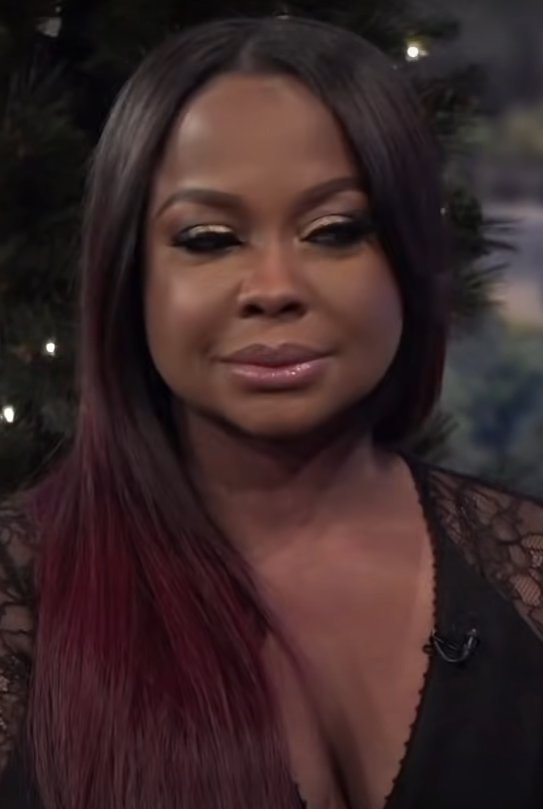
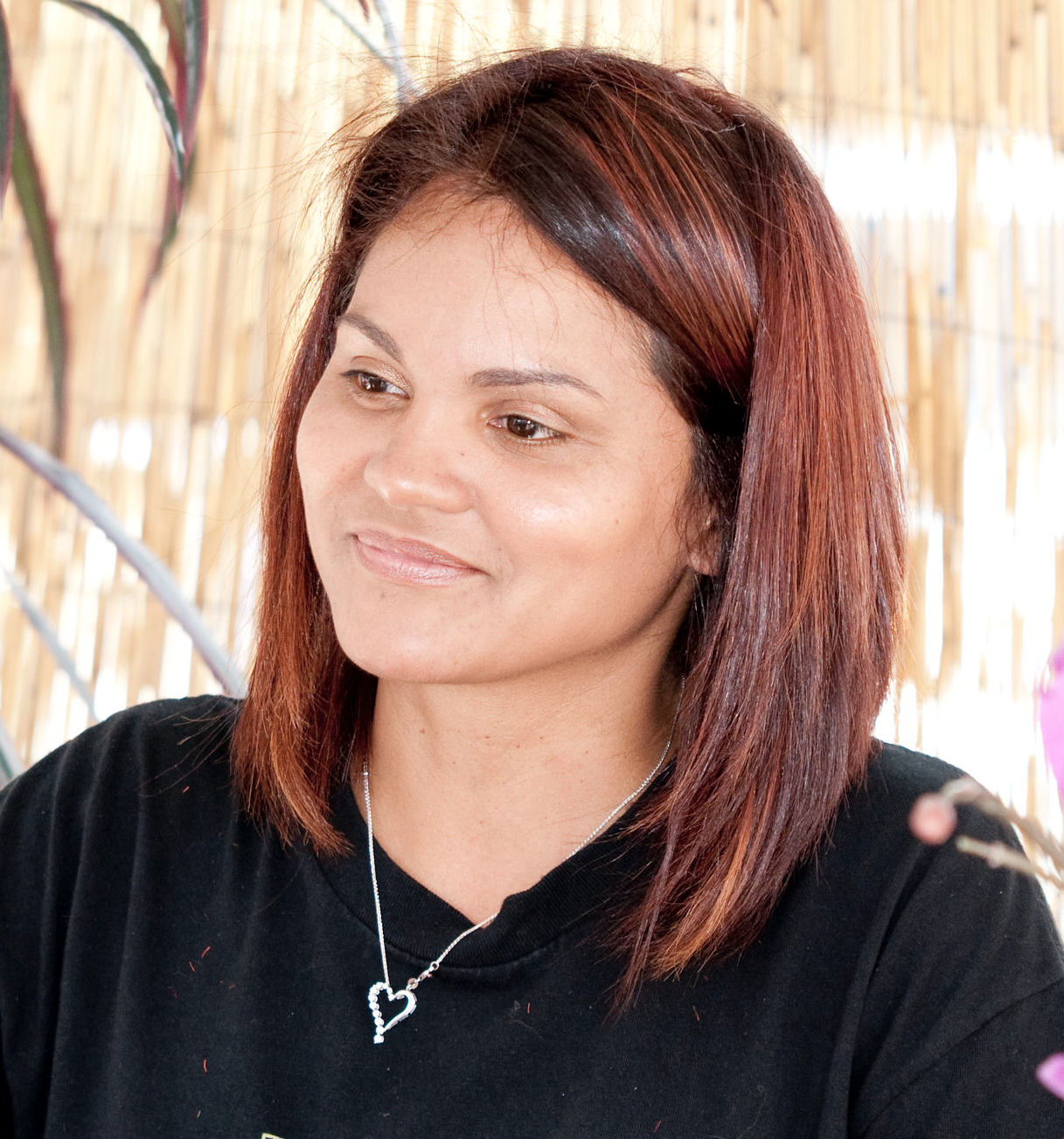
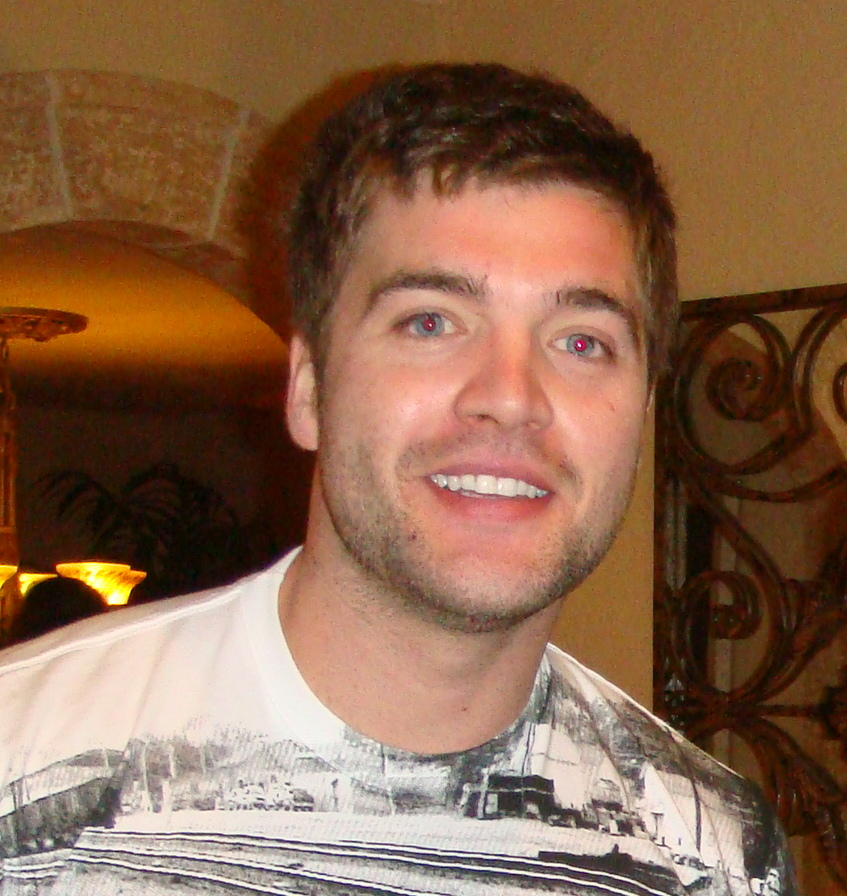
From left to right: Johnny "Bananas" Devenanzio, Peppermint, Maksim "Maks" Chmerkovskiy, Deontay Wilder, Ekin-Su Cülcüloğlu, Larsa Pippen, Tamra Judge, Dan Gheesling, Parvati Shallow, John Bercow, Phaedra Parks, Sandra Diaz-Twine, and CT Tamburello

Unlike the first season, this season's cast was composed entirely of reality show participants and public figures. In addition to the pre-existing relationships and rivalries between the contestants who have participated on the same show in the past, this season also includes a preexisting personal relationship between Larsa Pippen and Marcus Jordan, who were dating at the time of the show's production. It was revealed that season 1 contestant Kate Chastain would return as an intruder. Big Brother 2 winner Will Kirby made a cameo hosting a challenge.

List of The Traitors contestants
Contestant	Age	From	Notability/Debut series	Affiliation	Finish
Johnny "Bananas" Devenanzio	41	Fullerton, California	The Real World: Key West (Note: Cannatella, Devenanzio and Tamburello were credited on the show as being from The Challenge.)	Faithful	Murdered (Episode 2)
Peppermint	43	New York City, New York	RuPaul's Drag Race 9	Faithful	Banished (Episode 2)
Marcus Jordan	32	Miami, Florida	Fashion entrepreneur (Note: Jordan was credited as a fashion entrepreneur, but he is also a former collegiate basketball player and the son of Michael Jordan.)	Faithful	Murdered (Episode 3)
Maksim "Maks" Chmerkovskiy	43	Los Angeles, California	Dancing with the Stars 2	Faithful	Banished (Episode 3)
Deontay Wilder	37	Tuscaloosa, Alabama	Professional boxer	Faithful	Walked (Episode 4)
Ekin-Su Cülcüloğlu	29	London, United Kingdom	Love Island UK 8	Faithful	Murdered (Episode 4)
Larsa Pippen	49	Miami, Florida	The Real Housewives of Miami	Faithful	Banished (Episode 4)
Tamra Judge	56	Orange County, California	The Real Housewives of Orange County	Faithful	Murdered (Episode 5)
Janelle Pierzina	43	Lakeville, Minnesota	Big Brother 6	Faithful	Banished (Episode 5)
Dan Gheesling	40	Dearborn, Michigan	Big Brother 10	Traitor	Banished (Episode 6)
Carsten "Bergie" Bergersen	24	Cottage Grove, Minnesota	Love Island USA 5	Faithful	Murdered (Episode 8)
Parvati Shallow	40	Los Angeles, California	Survivor: Cook Islands	Traitor (Note: Shallow was recruited as a Traitor in Episode 1.)	Banished (Episode 8)
Kevin Kreider	40	Los Angeles, California	Bling Empire	Faithful	Murdered (Episode 9)
Peter Weber	32	Westlake Village, California	The Bachelorette 15	Faithful	Banished (Episode 9)
John Bercow	60	London, United Kingdom	Former Speaker of the House of Commons	Faithful	Murdered (Episode 10)
Phaedra Parks	49	Atlanta, Georgia	The Real Housewives of Atlanta (Note: Parks was credited as being from Married to Medicine)	Traitor	Banished (Episode 10)
Shereé Whitfield	53	Atlanta, Georgia	The Real Housewives of Atlanta	Faithful	Murdered (Episode 11)
Sandra Diaz-Twine	49	Fayetteville, North Carolina	Survivor: Pearl Islands	Faithful	Banished (Episode 11)
Kate Chastain (Note: Chastain entered the game in Episode 5.) The Traitors 1	40	Fort Lauderdale, Florida	Below Deck 2	Traitor (Note: Chastain was recruited as a Traitor in Episode 9 following an ultimatum.)	Banished (Episode 11)
Mercedes "MJ" Javid	51	Beverly Hills, California	Shahs of Sunset	Faithful	Banished (Episode 11)
Trishelle Cannatella	43	New Orleans, Louisiana	The Real World: Las Vegas	Faithful	Winner (Episode 11)
Chris "CT" Tamburello	43	Boston, Massachusetts	The Real World: Paris	Faithful	Winner (Episode 11)

== Episodes ==
The Traitors season 2 episodes
No. overall	No. in season	Title	Original release date
12	1	"Betrayers, Fakes and Fraudsters"	January 12, 2024
13	2	"Welcome to the Dark Side"	January 12, 2024
14	3	"Murder in Plain Sight"	January 12, 2024
15	4	"The Funeral"	January 18, 2024
16	5	"A Killer Move"	January 25, 2024
17	6	"Backstab and Betrayal"	February 1, 2024
18	7	"Blood on Their Hands"	February 8, 2024
19	8	"Knives at Dawn"	February 15, 2024
20	9	"A Game of Death"	February 22, 2024
21	10	"The Weight of Deceit"	February 29, 2024
22	11	"One Final Hurdle"	March 7, 2024
23	12	"Reunion"	March 7, 2024

== Elimination history ==
Key
The contestant was a Faithful
The contestant was a Traitor
The contestant was ineligible to vote
The contestant was immune at this Banishment and Murder

Episode	1	2	3	4	5	6	7	8	9		10	11
Traitors' Decision	Parvati	Bananas	Marcus	Ekin-Su (Note: After the Round Table in Episode 3, the Traitors were tasked to murder someone in plain sight, by getting their victim to drink from a "poisoned" chalice. Parvati was successful in getting a player, Ekin-Su, to drink from it. The following morning, the players were told that the victim's identity would be revealed at the end of the "Funeral Procession" challenge.)	Tamra	~~Bergie~~ (Note: At the end of episode 5, the Traitors decided to murder Bergie. However, Bergie secretly had won a shield during the previous mission and was spared from elimination.)	Peter	Bergie	Kate	Kevin	John	Shereé
Traitors' Decision	Offer (Note: In Episode 1, the Traitors were given the opportunity to recruit a Faithful. The Faithful would then have the opportunity to accept or decline. Dan and Phaedra chose Parvati, and she accepted the offer.)	Murder					Offer (Note: Instead of choosing to murder a player, the Traitors decided to offer Peter the opportunity to become a Traitor. He declined their offer.)	Murder	Ultimatum (Note: Following Parvati's banishment, Phaedra was offered the chance to meet a Faithful face-to-face and offer them an ultimatum: become a Traitor or be Murdered. She chose Kate, who accepted the offer.)	Murder		
Shield	CT; Deontay; Janelle	Dan	Janelle; Peter; Tamra	None	Bergie; Trishelle	Shereé	Kevin; Sandra; Shereé; Phaedra; CT; John; Peter (Note: There was no Banishment in this episode. Instead, as the Shield winners for the round, Kevin & Sandra, had to initiate a chain of safety by conferring immunity to Murder to another contestant of their choice, with that contestant then choosing someone else to make immune, until five other contestants were selected for immunity, while the rest would be vunerable to be murdered.)	Trishelle	CT		MJ	None
Banishment	None	Peppermint	Maks	Larsa	Janelle	Dan	None	Parvati	Peter		Phaedra	Sandra
Vote	None	17–2–1	10–2–2– 2–1–1	8–4–1– 1–1	9–5	11–1–1	None	7–4	5–4 (Note: Peter's banishment was revealed in Episode 10 after the vote ended on a cliffhanger in Episode 9.)		6–1	4–1
CT	No; Vote	Peppermint	Maks	Larsa	Janelle	Dan	No; Vote	Parvati	Phaedra		Phaedra	Sandra
Trishelle	No; Vote	Peppermint	Maks	Larsa	Dan	Dan	No; Vote	Phaedra	Phaedra		Phaedra	Sandra
MJ	No; Vote	John	Dan	Kevin	Janelle	Dan	No; Vote	Parvati	Peter		Phaedra	Sandra
Kate	Not in Game				Janelle (Note: Kate was introduced to the game in Episode 5. Upon her introduction, she could not be voted for or be murdered that night.)	Dan	No; Vote	Parvati	Peter		Phaedra	Sandra
Sandra	No; Vote	Peppermint	Maks	Larsa	Janelle	Dan	No; Vote	Parvati	Peter		Phaedra	Kate
Shereé	No; Vote	Peppermint	Janelle	John	Janelle	Dan	No; Vote	Parvati	Peter		Phaedra	Murdered (Episode 11)
Phaedra	No; Vote	Peppermint	Ekin-Su	Kevin	Janelle	Dan	No; Vote	Parvati	Peter		CT	Banished (Episode 10)
John	No; Vote	Peppermint	Maks	Kevin	Dan	Dan	No; Vote	Parvati	Phaedra		Murdered (Episode 10)	
Peter	No; Vote	Peppermint	Kevin	MJ	Dan	Parvati	No; Vote	Phaedra	Phaedra		Banished (Episode 10)	
Kevin	No; Vote	Peppermint	Peter	Larsa	Janelle	Dan	No; Vote	Phaedra	Murdered (Episode 9)			
Parvati	No; Vote	Peppermint	Kevin	Larsa	Janelle	Dan	No; Vote	Phaedra	Banished (Episode 8)			
Bergie	No; Vote	Peppermint	Maks	Larsa	Dan	Dan	No; Vote	Murdered (Episode 8)				
Dan	No; Vote	Peppermint	Maks	Larsa	Janelle	Phaedra	Banished (Episode 6)					
Janelle	No; Vote	Peppermint	Maks	Larsa	Dan	Banished (Episode 5)						
Tamra	No; Vote	Peppermint	Maks	Kevin	Murdered (Episode 5)							
Larsa	No; Vote	Peppermint	Dan	CT	Banished (Episode 4)							
Ekin-Su	No; Vote	Peppermint	Maks	Murdered (Episode 4)								
Deontay	No; Vote	Peppermint	Maks	Quit (Episode 4)								
Maks	No; Vote	John	Ekin-Su	Banished (Episode 3)								
Marcus	No; Vote	Peppermint	Murdered (Episode 3)									
Peppermint	No; Vote	Trishelle	Banished (Episode 2)									
Bananas	No; Vote	Murdered (Episode 2)										

=== End game ===
Episode	11					
Decision	Banish	Kate	Banish	Tie	MJ	Game Over; Faithfuls Win
Vote	3–1	3–1	2–1	1–1–1	2–1	Game Over; Faithfuls Win
CT	Banish	Kate	Banish	MJ	MJ	Winners
Trishelle	Banish	Kate	Banish	CT	MJ	Winners
MJ	Banish	Kate	End Game	Trishelle	Trishelle	Banished
Kate	End Game	Trishelle	Banished			

== Missions ==
Episode	Title	Money available	Money earned	Total pot	Shield winner
1	"Betrayers, Fakes and Fraudsters"	$30,000	$30,000	$30,000	CT Deontay Janelle
Together, the 21 contestants worked together to build a giant beacon and set it alight in the middle of a loch, by gathering and rearranging the puzzle pieces for the beacon first. To guide the group, a replica of the puzzle was also hidden among bottles scattered along the loch shore. In order to set it ablaze, all players must have left the water; however, they were first tied up to a pole, and needed to untangle themselves first, and deciding whether to go for a Shield (two in the loch and one on land), start the puzzle or help someone untie themselves first. Completing the Mission within 40 minutes would earn the group $30,000.
2	"Welcome to the Dark Side"	$20,000	$16,000	$46,000	Dan
The group of 21 contestants were split into three groups, each with their own marked paths. They encountered three questions about their fellow contestants based on a previously-completed questionnaire, with each possible option associated with a scarecrow that had a key on their neck. They had to guess the correct option, carry the scarecrow to a locked box and attempt to open it with the scarecrow's key. If they succeeded, they would be eventually guided to a 'field of gold' full of scarecrows, which they disassembled to try and find ten hidden gold coins. Additionally, three shields were hidden in scarecrows. The group had 30 minutes to complete entire mission and win up to $20,000.
3	"Murder in Plain Sight"	$20,000	$19,500	$65,500	Janelle Peter Tamra
The 20 contestants had 15 minutes to find the gold hidden in the various graves, crypts and tombs in the cemetery at night. To find the gold, the contestants needed to use tools scattered around the cemetery to break things open. The gold would only be counted if it was placed in a wheelbarrow at the cemetery entrance. To make things more difficult, searchlights traversed across the cemetery; any contestant caught in them were immediately eliminated from the game and any gold they were carrying. Only 9 players were allowed to search at a time so the rest of the players were a substitute in case a player is caught and eliminated from the game. 3 shields were also hidden somewhere in the cemetery.
4	"The Funeral"	$20,000	$0	$65,500	—N/a
The contestants took a long and slow walk to the murdered contestant's final resting place; along the way, they were given a series of questions hinting at who was safe, allowing those who were the correct answer(s) to enter the carriage instead of walking with the procession, and eliminating them from consideration. The three contestants left then stepped into coffins at the burial plot, with the group voting on who they believe was murdered. If the majority could correctly guess which contestant was murdered, they earned $20,000 for the prize pot.
5	"A Killer Move"	$15,000	$10,000	$75,500	Bergie Trishelle
The group of 13 contestants were split into three pairs of 'runners' who ran about the castle grounds with a marked map, and a group of seven that stayed behind in the castle. Within a time limit of 20 minutes, the runners located various stations, where they heard a bird call after blowing their whistles. They then imitated this call back to the castle group via radios; the castle group then had to search among various stuffed birds to find the one that made the right call, as well as where it could be found (with only one guess per bird call). Each correct bird call identified (with a maximum of 6) netted $2,500, alongside a bird in the Walled Garden that would net the runners that mimicked it shields if the castle group guessed it correctly.
6	"Backstab and Betrayal"	$20,000	$20,000	$95,500	Shereé
The 13 contestants had to make their way to an incomplete giant catapult, collecting catapult pieces along the way to fully assemble it. Once complete, they then had to fire a golden cannonball and make sure it hit the distant target to win $20,000. They had one hour to complete the Mission. Along the route, Shield cannonballs could also be collected, and each contestant holding these cannonballs would be eligible to fire them at the target as well. The contestant whose Shield cannonball came closest to the target bullseye would then win a Shield.
7	"Blood on Their Hands"	$25,000	$8,000	$103,500	Kevin Sandra
The twelve remaining contestants were split into six pairs, and tasked with carrying $25,000 worth of gold through the woods. While making their way through the woods, each pair would encounter trivia or puzzle questions with two options they could pick from. They then had to follow a rope course based on their choice and have one member attempt to pick up a scroll along the way; if they were correct, they could continue on, but if they were wrong, they would be stuck in a bog or booby trap. The gold would only be banked if at least one member of each pair completed the course successfully. In addition, the pair that banked their gold the fastest would win Shields.
8	"Knives at Dawn"	$20,000	$11,000	$114,500	Trishelle
The contestants were dropped off at a cabin in the woods and met legendary Big Brother player Will Kirby, where they found the entry to a network of escape tunnels, a map and instructions. Only five contestants could enter the tunnel at one time, while everyone else stayed behind to read the map, control the tunnel lights and communicate with those underground. The contestants had to locate gold hidden in various parts of the tunnel network, avoid any dead ends and escape the tunnels through a well within 30 minutes, all while avoiding a range of annoyances (both above and underground) meant to gross them out. Up to $20,000 could be discovered and won, but for every contestant left in the cabin or tunnels when time ran out (or chose to exit through the cabin door instead of the tunnel), $1,000 was deducted from the total. Additionally, a Shield was hidden in one of the tunnels.
9	"A Game of Death"	$25,000	$15,250	$129,750	CT
Each contestant had a stained glass window with their name on it. They then had to take turns to fire from a crossbow at a window of their choice. The contestants' task was to shatter all the windows except one - whoever's window was left standing would win a Shield. In the meantime, each missed crossbow shot before this was accomplished would cost the group $250 from a starting pot of $25,000.
10	"The Weight of Deceit"	$30,000	$28,350	$158,100	MJ
The seven contestants had to dig up golden nuggets from a huge pile of dirt worth $150 each. They then had to cross a series of floating platforms to the other side of a pond and deposit the nuggets on the plate of a balance scale. They had 20 minutes to dig up, transport and deposit as many nuggets as they could, with up to $30,000 worth of gold hidden in the dirt, and any gold dropped into the water lost forever. A Shield was also hidden in the dirt, which could be banked by depositing it on the balance scale as well.
11	"One Final Hurdle"	$50,000	$50,000	$208,100	—N/a
Follow the path to the boat and raise the flag for $50,000. The players could take diversions along the path to find more flags to take to the boat, with a possible extra $10,000. If the players collected all of the flags and raised the flag they received the whole prize of $50,000.

== Production ==
Similar to the previous season, primary filming took place in Ardross Castle in the Scottish Highlands, starting around September 21, 2023.
