= The Traitors (American TV series) =

American reality competition show

- Also known as: The Traitors US
- Genre: Reality; Game show
- Based on: De Verraders by: Marc Pos; Jasper Hoogendoorn
- Presented by: Alan Cumming
- Starring: The Traitors contestants
- Country of origin: United States
- Original language: English
- No. of seasons: 4
- No. of episodes: 47

Production
- Production locations: Ardross, Highland, Scotland
- Camera setup: Multi-camera
- Production company: Studio Lambert

Original release
- Network: Peacock
- Release: January 12, 2023 – present

Related
- The Traitors: New Blood; The Traitors (British TV series); International versions

The Traitors (also known as The Traitors US for outside of the United States) is an American reality competition series based on the Dutch series De Verraders.

Following the premise of De Verraders, the show features a group of contestants participating in a social deduction game similar to Mafia or Werewolf, set in and among the grounds of Ardross Castle in Scotland. During the game, a small group of contestants become the titular "Traitors", and work together to eliminate the other contestants to win a grand prize, while the remaining contestants become "Faithful" and are tasked to discover and banish the Traitors by voting to eliminate them to win the grand prize. While the first season featured civilian contestants and reality television personalities, subsequent seasons exclusively featured the reality television personalities and other celebrities.

It is hosted by Scottish actor Alan Cumming. The first season was released on Peacock on January 12, 2023. In February 2023, the series was renewed for a second season, and the first three episodes were released on January 12, 2024. In February 2024, the show was renewed for a third season. In August 2024, the show was renewed for two additional seasons through season 5. The fifth season is expected to premiere in January 2027. A spin-off, titled The Traitors: New Blood, featured and all-civilian cast and premiered on September 17, 2026, on NBC. One day before the premiere of New Blood, the show was renewed for three additional seasons.

The American show also acts as a sister show to the British version, with both being produced by Studio Lambert for the BBC and Peacock. They share the same location, props, and missions, with the main difference being the hosts.

== Format ==
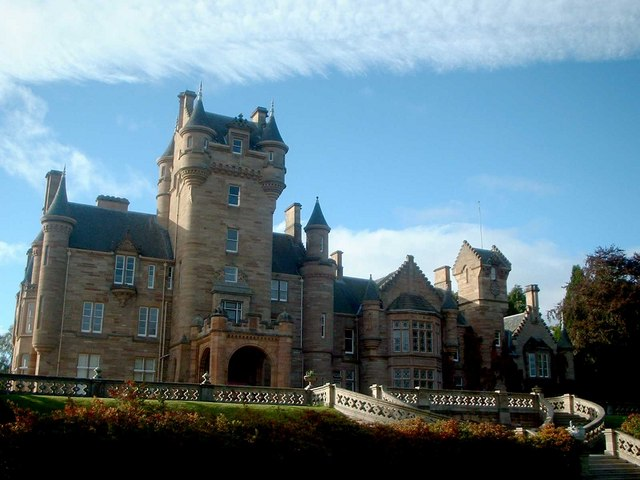
The series was filmed at Ardross Castle in Scotland (pictured in 2003)

Contestants arrive at a castle in the Scottish Highlands with a goal to win a cash prize that is added through missions. The players are known as the "Faithful" but among them are the "Traitors", a select few contestants selected by the host, whose goal is to eliminate the Faithfuls and claim the prize for themselves. If the Faithful contestants eliminate all the Traitors, they will share the prize fund, but if any Traitors remain at the end, they steal the money, which is divided amongst them.

Most nights, the Traitors come together meeting in the castle "turret" and decide upon one Faithful contestant to "murder", who must then leave the game immediately. The remaining Faithful contestants do not know who has been eliminated until the following day when that person does not enter the castle dining room for breakfast.

The murders usually occur after the banishments. The group then participates in a mission to add money to the prize fund. Some challenges also may offer an opportunity for players to win a "shield", which gives players immunity from being murdered that night, but not from the banishment vote. An attempted murder on the shield holder will result in no player being eliminated.

At the end of most days, the group participates in the Banishment Ceremony, where the players gather at the Round Table to discuss who they want to eliminate before individually voting for a player to banish. Players cast their votes privately before revealing their vote in turn to everyone, as they provide reasons for the votes. The person obtaining the most votes is banished from the game and must reveal their affiliation at the designated "Circle of Truth". Starting from season three, banished players do not reveal their affiliation on the final day. In a tied vote, a run-off vote occurs between those tied with the highest vote tallies. In season 5, if the players banish a Traitor, they will add $15,000 to the pot.

When a Traitor is eliminated, the host sometimes gives the remaining Traitors the opportunity to give a Faithful player of their choice an ultimatum: be recruited and join the traitors, or be murdered immediately.

=== End Game ===
At the end of each season, the remaining players will participate in the final challenge known as the "Fire of Truth". They are given a choice to "Banish Again" or to "End Game." A unanimous "End Game" vote concludes the game, while a single vote to "Banish Again" results in another banishment vote, followed by another choice between "Banish Again" or "End Game". If only two players remain, the game ends immediately. If all remaining players are Faithful, then the prize money is divided evenly among them. However, if any Traitors remain, they win the entire pot.

== Episodes ==
=== Series overview ===
Series overview
Season	Contestants	Episodes	Originally released		Winner(s)	Runner(s)-up	Prize (out of $250,000)	Traitors
Season	Contestants	Episodes	First released	Last released	Winner(s)	Runner(s)-up	Prize (out of $250,000)	Traitors
1	20	11	January 12, 2023	February 28, 2023	Cirie Fields (Traitor)	Andie Vanacore; Quentin Jiles (Faithfuls)	$250,000	Christian de la Torre Cirie Fields Cody Calafiore Arie Luyendyk Jr. (from ep. 7)
2	22	12	January 12, 2024	March 7, 2024	Chris "CT" Tamburello; Trishelle Cannatella (Faithfuls)	Mercedes "MJ" Javid (Faithful)	$208,100	Dan Gheesling Phaedra Parks Parvati Shallow (from ep. 2) Kate Chastain (from ep. 9)
3	23	12	January 9, 2025	March 6, 2025	Dolores Catania; Dylan Efron; Ivar Mountbatten; Gabby Windey (Faithfuls)	Britney Haynes (Traitor)	$204,300	Bob the Drag Queen Carolyn Wiger Danielle Reyes Rob Mariano (from ep. 2) Britney Haynes (from ep. 10)
4	23	12	January 8, 2026	February 26, 2026	Rob Rausch (Traitor)	Maura Higgins (Faithful)	$220,800	Candiace Dillard Bassett Lisa Rinna Rob Rausch Donna Kelce (Secret Traitor) Eric Nam (from ep. 9)
5	23	TBA	January 14, 2027	TBA	TBA	TBA	TBA	TBA

=== Season 1 ===
The Traitors season 1 episodes
No. overall	No. in season	Title	Original release date
1	1	"The Game Is Afoot"	January 12, 2023
2	2	"Buried Alive"	January 12, 2023
3	3	"Murder They Wrote"	January 12, 2023
4	4	"Life or Death Situation"	January 12, 2023
5	5	"Getting Away with Murder"	January 12, 2023
6	6	"Suspicion and Sabotage"	January 12, 2023
7	7	"The Mask Is Slipping"	January 12, 2023
8	8	"Cabins in the Woods"	January 12, 2023
9	9	"Trust No One"	January 12, 2023
10	10	"The Grand Finale"	January 12, 2023
11	11	"Reunion"	February 28, 2023

=== Season 2 ===
The Traitors season 2 episodes
No. overall	No. in season	Title	Original release date
12	1	"Betrayers, Fakes and Fraudsters"	January 12, 2024
13	2	"Welcome to the Dark Side"	January 12, 2024
14	3	"Murder in Plain Sight"	January 12, 2024
15	4	"The Funeral"	January 18, 2024
16	5	"A Killer Move"	January 25, 2024
17	6	"Backstab and Betrayal"	February 1, 2024
18	7	"Blood on Their Hands"	February 8, 2024
19	8	"Knives at Dawn"	February 15, 2024
20	9	"A Game of Death"	February 22, 2024
21	10	"The Weight of Deceit"	February 29, 2024
22	11	"One Final Hurdle"	March 7, 2024
23	12	"Reunion"	March 7, 2024

=== Season 3 ===
The Traitors season 3 episodes
No. overall	No. in season	Title	Original release date
24	1	"Let Battle Commence"	January 9, 2025
25	2	"Revenge Is a Dish Best Served Cold"	January 9, 2025
26	3	"Nail in a Coffin"	January 9, 2025
27	4	"I Will Bury You Under the Sand"	January 16, 2025
28	5	"All This Murderous Power"	January 23, 2025
29	6	"A Dysfunctional Family"	January 30, 2025
30	7	"Til Death Us Do Part"	February 6, 2025
31	8	"A B**** Is Lying"	February 13, 2025
32	9	"A Silent Assassin"	February 20, 2025
33	10	"The Power of the Seer"	February 27, 2025
34	11	"The Day of Reckoning Is Upon Us"	March 6, 2025
35	12	"Reunion"	March 6, 2025

=== Season 4 ===
The Traitors season 4 episodes
No. overall	No. in season	Title	Original release date
36	1	"Let the Cards Fall As They Will"	January 8, 2026
37	2	"The Death Conga"	January 8, 2026
38	3	"Show Me Your Faces"	January 8, 2026
39	4	"Cut the Head off the Snake"	January 15, 2026
40	5	"If You're Gonna Come for Me, I'll Finish You"	January 15, 2026
41	6	"Planning a Coup"	January 22, 2026
42	7	"The Black Banquet"	January 29, 2026
43	8	"A Queen Never Comes Off Her Throne"	February 5, 2026
44	9	"Think Outside the Box"	February 12, 2026
45	10	"Do You Know the Enemy?"	February 19, 2026
46	11	"Leap of Faith"	February 26, 2026
47	12	"Reunion"	February 26, 2026

== Spin-off ==
A spin-off titled The Traitors: New Blood was announced on June 18, 2026. The first season premiered on September 17, 2026 on NBC with episodes releasing the next day on Peacock. The first season concluded on November 19, 2026. The series was renewed for a second season in 2026.

== International broadcasts ==
In the United Kingdom, the series was acquired by the BBC as a companion to its British version, with episodes released on BBC iPlayer the day after the American release, January 13, 2023, and linear television airings for BBC Three and BBC One. However, since 2024, the series was moved to air in late January as the BBC moved the British version to early January, typically airing in the same slot on BBC Three as the British version.

In Australia, the series was made available to stream on 10 Play in March 2023, as a companion to the Australian version broadcast by Network 10. Starting in 2026, the Peacock edition mostly featuring celebrities and reality stars is billed in Australia as The Celebrity Traitors US, while the civilian New Blood season is billed as The Traitors US.

In Canada, the show is available to stream on Crave. The Canadian version of the series premiered on October 2, 2023 on CTV.

The series, as well as the British, Flemish and Australian versions of the show, are currently available to stream on Videoland in the Netherlands.

== Companion series ==
=== The Traitors Postmortem ===
During the second season, a web program titled The Traitors Postmortem was introduced, an after-show program featuring additional footage and interviews with eliminated contestants, episodes were released on Peacock and on Peacock's YouTube channel.

=== The Traitors Official Podcast ===
With the season 4 premiere, a companion podcast titled The Traitors Official Podcast was introduced and hosted by season 3 contestants Rob Mariano and Bob the Drag Queen. The podcast premiered on January 8, 2026, with weekly releases of audio and video episodes produced by USG audio. The podcast features guest interviews with the eliminated contestants each episode.

== Production ==
To emphasize the show's authentic Scottish Highlands setting at Ardross Castle, production utilizes live traditional musicians to frame dramatic events, missions, and contestant arrivals. Among the local musicians featured on-screen is James Mackenzie, Dingwall, a veteran bagpiper from Ross and Cromarty who performs with the Alness Pipe Band. Known for his mastery of traditional pibroch (classical pipe music), Mackenzie is dressed in traditional Highland attire, including the Mackenzie tartan, to provide the show's distinct, tense auditory backdrop.

The American show is a sister show to the British version, with both being produced by Studio Lambert for the BBC and Peacock. They both feature the same location, props, and missions, with the main difference being the hosts and the contestants.

== Reception ==
=== Television ratings ===
The Traitors became the number one original reality series on the streamer, with the premiere of the season being BBC Three's most-watched show since the relaunch of its linear television channel.

=== Awards and nominations ===
Award	Year	Category	Nominee(s)	Result	Ref.
The Astra Awards	2023	Best Streaming Reality or Competition Series	The Traitors	Nominated	
Critics' Choice Real TV Awards	2023	Best Competition Series	The Traitors	Nominated	
Critics' Choice Real TV Awards	2024	Best Competition Series	The Traitors	Won	
Critics' Choice Real TV Awards	2024	Best Ensemble Cast in an Unscripted Series	The Traitors	Won	
Critics' Choice Real TV Awards	2024	Best Show Host	Alan Cumming	Won	
Critics' Choice Real TV Awards	2024	Male Star of the Year	Alan Cumming	Won	
Critics' Choice Real TV Awards	2024	Female Star of the Year	Phaedra Parks	Nominated	
Critics' Choice Real TV Awards	2025	Best Competition Series	The Traitors	Won	
Critics' Choice Real TV Awards	2025	Best Ensemble Cast in an Unscripted Series	The Traitors	Won	
Critics' Choice Real TV Awards	2025	Best Show Host	Alan Cumming	Won	
Critics' Choice Real TV Awards	2025	Male Star of the Year	Alan Cumming	Nominated	
Critics' Choice Real TV Awards	2025	Male Star of the Year	Dylan Efron	Nominated	
Critics' Choice Real TV Awards	2025	Female Star of the Year	Gabby Windey	Nominated	
MTV Movie & TV Awards	2023	Best Competition Series	The Traitors	Nominated	
Primetime Emmy Awards	2024	Outstanding Reality Competition Program	Mike Cotton, Toni Ireland, Sam Rees-Jones, Stephen Lambert, Jack Burgess and Tim Harcourt, Ben Cook, Joe Evans, Laura Gallen, Chris Mannion, Emma Carroll and Deena Katz, Zoe Duerden, and Alan Cumming	Won	
Primetime Emmy Awards	2025	Outstanding Reality Competition Program	Mike Cotton, Sam Rees-Jones, Rosie Franks, Stephen Lambert, Jack Burgess and Tim Harcourt, executive producers; Emma Carroll, Zoe Duerden, Laura Gallen, Deena Katz, Chris Mannion and Claire O'Shea, co-executive producers; Alan Cumming, producer	Won	
Primetime Emmy Awards	2026	Outstanding Reality Competition Program	Stephen Lambert, Mike Cotton, Sam Rees-Jones, Rosie Franks, Tim Harcourt, Jack Burgess, Darrell Olsen and Alan Cumming, executive producers; Claire O'Shea, Chris Mannion, Laura Gallen, Zoe Duerden, Emma Carroll, Sarah Pack and Cally Marriage, co-executive producers	Won	
Primetime Creative Arts Emmy Awards	2023	Outstanding Casting for a Reality Program	Erin Tomasello, Jazzy Collins, Moira Paris, and Holly Osifat	Won	
Primetime Creative Arts Emmy Awards	2024	Outstanding Cinematography for a Reality Program	Siggi Rosen-Rawlings and Matt Wright (for "The Funeral")	Nominated	
Primetime Creative Arts Emmy Awards	2024	Outstanding Directing for a Reality Program	Ben Archard (for "Betrayers, Fakes and Fraudsters")	Nominated	
Primetime Creative Arts Emmy Awards	2024	Outstanding Host for a Reality or Reality Competition Program	Alan Cumming	Won	
Primetime Creative Arts Emmy Awards	2025	Outstanding Host for a Reality or Reality Competition Program	Alan Cumming	Won	
Primetime Creative Arts Emmy Awards	2025	Outstanding Cinematography for a Reality Program	Siggi Rosen-Rawlings, Matt Wright, Jack Booth, Alex Bruno, Ned Ellis-Jones, Ollie Green, Quin Jessop, Guy Linton, Joshua Montague, Paul Rudge, James Spencer, Matt Thomson, Alex Took, and Melvin Wright	Won	
Primetime Creative Arts Emmy Awards	2025	Outstanding Directing for a Reality Program	Ben Archard (for "Let Battle Commence")	Won	
Primetime Creative Arts Emmy Awards	2025	Outstanding Picture Editing for a Structured Reality or Competition Program	Patrick Owen and James Seddon-Brown (for "Let Battle Commence")	Won	
Primetime Creative Arts Emmy Awards	2026	Outstanding Production Design for a Variety or Reality Series	Stuart Frossell, Luke Fuller, Georgia Picton, Alex Robertson, Rosie Westwood, Celina Hodge (for "The Black Banquet")	Won	
Primetime Creative Arts Emmy Awards	2026	Outstanding Cinematography for a Reality Program	Siggi Rosen-Rawlings, Matt Wright, Will Antill, Jack Booth, Alex Bruno, Ollie Green, Quin Jessop, Guy Linton, Scott McKee, Joshua Montague, Hazel Palmer, Steve Peters, Paul Rudge, James Spencer, Matt Thomson, Alex Took and Melvin Wright	Won	
Primetime Creative Arts Emmy Awards	2026	Outstanding Costumes for Variety, Nonfiction, or Reality Programming	Sam Spector and Rikki Finlay (for "The Black Banquet")	Won	
Primetime Creative Arts Emmy Awards	2026	Outstanding Picture Editing for a Structured Reality or Competition Program	Patrick Owen and James Seddon-Brown (for "The Death Conga")	Won	
Primetime Creative Arts Emmy Awards	2026	Outstanding Directing for a Reality Program	Ben Archard (for "Let the Cards Fall as They Will")	Won	
Primetime Creative Arts Emmy Awards	2026	Outstanding Host for a Reality or Reality Competition Program	Alan Cumming	Won	
Television Critics Association Awards	2023	Outstanding Achievement in Reality	The Traitors	Nominated	
Television Critics Association Awards	2024	Outstanding Achievement in Reality	The Traitors	Won	
Television Critics Association Awards	2025	Outstanding Achievement in Reality	The Traitors	Won	

== See also ==
Other versions

- The Traitors Australia
- The Traitors Canada
- The Traitors Ireland
- The Traitors NZ
- The Traitors UK
- The Traitors France
- De Verraders

Similar shows

- Survivor
- Killer Camp
- Million Dollar Secret
- The Mole
- Whodunnit?
