= Ian Terry =

American Big Brother winner (born 1991)

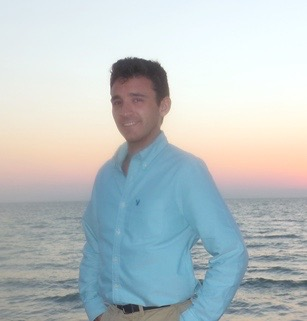
- Born: March 19, 1991 (age 35); Shaler Township, Pennsylvania, U.S.
- Occupation: Management consultant
- Television: Big Brother 14 (winner); Big Brother 22

Ian Patrick Terry (born March 19, 1991) is the winner of the American reality television show Big Brother 14 in 2012 and competed on Big Brother: All Stars in 2020. He was also a contestant on Reality Gamemasters in 2013 and season 4 of The Traitors.

== Education ==
Terry graduated from Shaler Area High School in the Pittsburgh suburb of Shaler.

== Big Brother ==
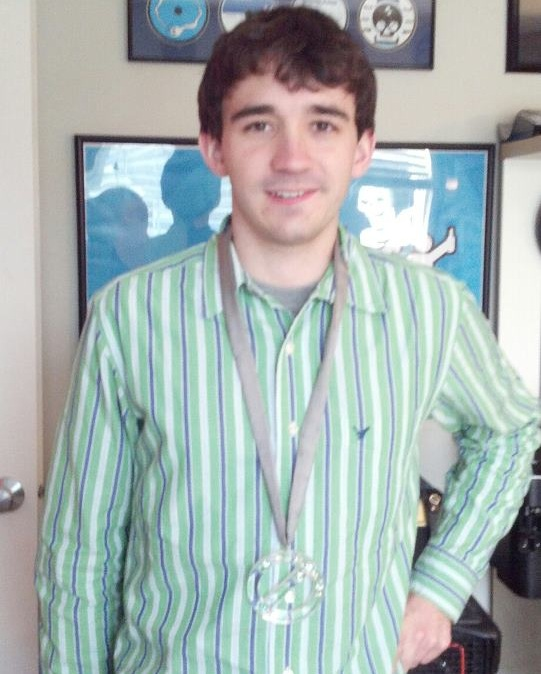
Terry in 2012

On Day 1, four coaches entered into the game to coach the houseguests. Ian was placed on Mike "Boogie" Malin's team. On Day 48, Ian won his first HoH competition. After that initial victory, he went on to win the rest of his eligible HoH competitions. With his win on finale night, he tied the record of the most HoHs in a season: four. On September 19, 2012, Terry won Big Brother 14 and the $500,000 prize after defeating Dan Gheesling, who was the winner of Big Brother 10 and one of the four returning coaches, by a vote of 6–1. Terry is one of ten HouseGuests, including Drew Daniel, Janelle Pierzina, Rachel Reilly, Aaryn Gries, Hayden Moss, Caleb Reynolds, Vanessa Rousso, Steve Moses and Vince Panaro in the show's history to win Head of Household four times in one season, and managed to avoid being nominated until Day 62, much to the collective chagrin of the house. Ian also holds the record for most consecutive HoH wins at 4. At 21 years and 6 months old at the time of his win, Terry became the youngest winner in American Big Brother history.

Terry re-entered the Big Brother house on August 5, 2020, to compete again in season 22, Big Brother: All-Stars. He was evicted on Day 44 by a 5–3 vote, finishing in 11th place, becoming the first Jury member. He voted for Cody Calafiore to win.

== Personal life ==
Terry currently resides in Houston, Texas and worked as a physics teacher at YES Prep Southeast before taking on a position at HighRadius Corporation. Additionally, Terry has made numerous appearances on Rob Has a Podcast and The Dom & Colin Podcast, usually discussing Survivor or Big Brother.

On Episode 3 of Big Brother 22: All-Stars, Terry disclosed to a group of HouseGuests that he is on the autism spectrum. During the live feeds of Big Brother 22: All-Stars on September 8, 2020, fellow HouseGuests, Memphis Garrett, Nicole Franzel, Dani Briones and Christmas Abbott were seen privately mocking Ian's quirks related to his autism diagnosis, specifically his rocking back and forth during conversations. This caused uproar from Big Brother fans on Twitter to admonish this behavior. Former Big Brother contestants also criticized the behavior of the other HouseGuests towards Terry on Twitter.

Terry was part of a team representing the United States in the 2021 World Backgammon Team Championship held in Trier, Germany.

== Filmography ==
=== Television ===
Year	Title	Role	Notes
2012	Big Brother 14	Contestant	Winner
2020	Big Brother: All-Stars	Contestant	Evicted; 11th place
2026	The Traitors	Contestant	Season 4; Eliminated, 23rd place

Preceded by Rachel Reilly	Winner of Big Brother; Season 14	Succeeded by Andy Herren
