= Cody Calafiore =

American television personality (born 1990)

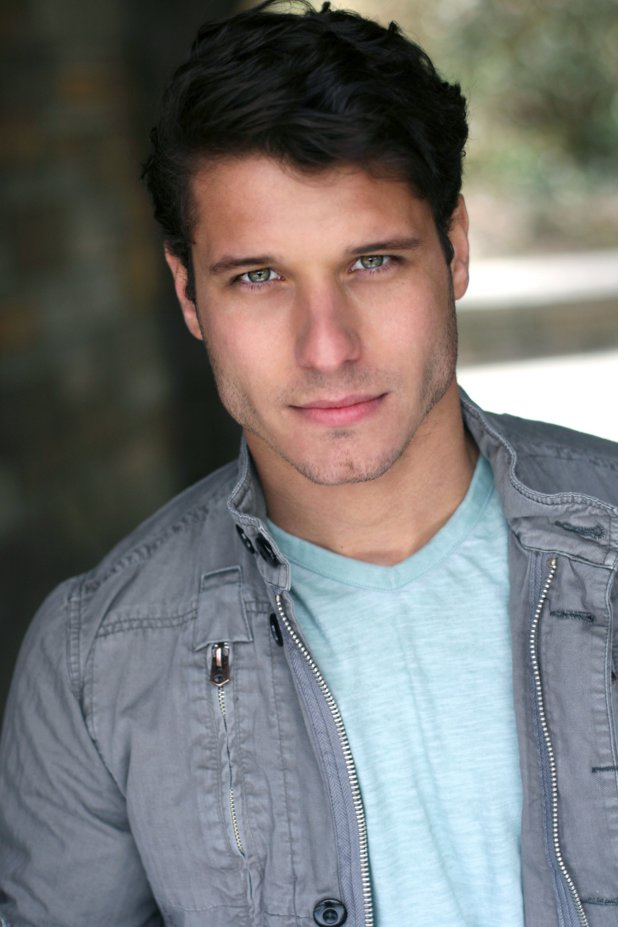
- Born: Cody Christopher Calafiore; December 13, 1990 (age 35); Hackensack, New Jersey, U.S.
- Education: Temple University
- Occupations: Actor, model, reality television personality
- Television: Big Brother 16 (runner-up); Big Brother 22 (winner); The Traitors; Big Brother: Reindeer Games
- Spouse: Cristie Laratta (m. 2024)

Cody Christopher Calafiore (born December 13, 1990) is an American reality television personality, actor and model. He was the runner-up on the reality television series Big Brother 16 in 2014. He was later crowned the winner of Big Brother 22: All-Stars in 2020. Finally, he was on Big Brother: Reindeer Games, where he placed 8th.

== Early life and education ==
Calafiore was born on December 13, 1990, in Hackensack, New Jersey.

Calafiore attended Monmouth University where he was a member of the soccer team before transferring to Temple University where he graduated from the Fox School of Business and Management with a Bachelors in business administration. He played for the Temple Owls soccer team from 2010 to 2012.

He trialed with the Columbus Crew in pre-season, before an ankle injury ended his soccer career.

== Big Brother ==
=== Season 16 ===
Calafiore entered the Big Brother house on Day 1 with the first group of contestants. On Day 2, he formed an alliance with Derrick Levasseur called "The Hitmen". Throughout the season, the two secretly worked together with the ultimate goal of being the final 2 players left in the game on finale night. Calafiore initially won the Head of Household (HOH) in Week 2, but his victory was rescinded after producers saw him touch the ground before he hit the buzzer. In week 4, Calafiore won HOH alongside Frankie Grande and nominated Victoria Rafaeli and Brittany Martinez for eviction. Calafiore's nominees lost the Battle of the Block competition, therefore, Calafiore remained HOH and Grande was dethroned.

In Week 8, Calafiore was nominated for eviction alongside Caleb Reynolds by HOH Grande. Calafiore and Reynolds lost the BOTB competition and remained on the block as a result. Calafiore was then nominated aside his former ally Zach Rance after Grande used the POV on Caleb and backdoored Rance. Calafiore survived eviction. In Week 9, he won his second HOH and became the first solo HOH of the season. He nominated Donny Thompson and Nicole Franzel for eviction. The same week, Calafiore won his first Power of Veto and chose to keep the nominations the same, which resulted in Thompson's eviction. In Week 11, Calafiore was nominated alongside Rafaeli by Grande, the HOH. However, due to a twist that reset the game by one week, both Calafiore and Rafaeli got off the block. In Week 12, Calafiore won his second and third Powers of Veto of the season. On Day 90, he was the sole vote to evict Reynolds. On Day 97, he won the final HOH of the season. He evicted Rafaeli and took his ally, Levasseur, to the final 2, a move considered by fans as one of the worst in the show's history. Calafiore became season's runner-up, losing to Levasseur on a 7–2 vote, winning $50,000.

Calafiore's older brother Paulie was a contestant on Big Brother 18, where he placed eighth.

=== Season 22 ===
In 2020, Calafiore returned to compete in the show's second All-Star season. He was HoH in weeks 1, 8, 9 and 12, giving him a total of 4 HoH victories and reigns. He won the PoV in weeks 3, 8, 9 and 11, giving him a total 4 PoV victories. He made it to the final 3 without being nominated. At the final 3, Calafiore won final HoH, becoming the first ever houseguest to win the final HoH twice, as well as the first ever houseguest to make it to the final 2 without ever going on the block. Calafiore won the show by a unanimous 9–0 vote. He became just the second houseguest in Big Brother American history to have won in the Final 2 (Big Brother 22) and to have lost in the Final 2 (Big Brother 16) after Dan Gheesling won Big Brother 10 and finished runner-up in Big Brother 14. He also became the second ever houseguest not to receive an eviction vote against him and received all the jury votes after Gheesling.

=== Reindeer Games ===
In 2023, Calafiore returned once again to compete in the show's holiday spin-off season. He was eliminated in the second episode.

== Career ==
In 2014, Calafiore appeared in an ad campaign for American underwear brand C-IN2 and was in several issues of Seventeen as part of their Hot Guys Panel. Prior to his television appearance, Calafiore spent two years as an event host at Total Entertainment in Hackensack, New Jersey. He was also a sales associate at ADP for six months in 2015. Following his appearance on Big Brother 16, Calafiore signed with New York-based modeling agency Soul Artist Management. He has since appeared in Winq Magazine, Men's Fitness, LOVE Magazine, Risbel Magazine, and three editorials for The Fashionisto. Calafiore has appeared in fashion shows as a model for Malan Breton, Gents, and Ricardo Seco. In 2016 Calafiore co-starred in the independent film What Happened Last Night. Calafiore joined Keller Williams Realty, representing Shrewsbury, New Jersey, in October 2019. In July 2021, he began a podcast with fellow Big Brother winner Derrick Levasseur called "The Winner's Circle" where they discuss the current season of Big Brother. In January 2023, Calafiore appeared as a contestant on the first season of Peacock's reality TV series The Traitors.

== Filmography ==
Film and television
Year	Title	Role	Notes
2014	Big Brother 16	Contestant	Runner-up (40 episodes)
2014	The Bold and the Beautiful	Himself	2 episodes
2015	Big Brother 17	Himself	Guest appearance; Episode 20
2016	What Happened Last Night	Joe Crosby	Independent Film
2016	Big Brother 18	Himself	Guest appearances; Episodes 1 & 14
2017	Set It Up	Duncan's Hook up	
2017	Clinton Road	Tyler	
2017	Live to Tell	Nick Styles	
2017	Days Like This	Mike	
2017	Stay	James	
2018	New Dogs, Old Tricks	Joe Crosby	Main role
2018	Fear Factor	Contestant	Runner-up with Zach Rance (aired July 31)
2019	Elementary	Jersey Shore	Episode: "The Latest Model"
2020	Big Brother 22	Contestant	Winner (37 episodes)
2020	Ivy & Mistletoe	Max Carson	Main role
2020	Joy & Hope	Gabriel Corsetti	Main role
2023	The Traitors (season 1)	Contestant	11th place (6 episodes, including reunion special)
2023	Big Brother 25	Himself	Guest appearance; 25th Anniversary Celebration Episode (aired July 26)
2023	Big Brother: Reindeer Games	Contestant	8th place (2 episodes)

== Personal life ==
On October 22, 2022, Cody announced his engagement to his girlfriend of seven years, Cristie Laratta, and they married on February 16, 2024.

Preceded by GinaMarie Zimmerman	Runner-up of Big Brother; Season 16	Succeeded by Liz Nolan

Preceded by Jackson Michie	Winner of Big Brother; Season 22	Succeeded by Xavier Prather
