= Big Brother 22 (American season) =

American reality-TV show season

Big Brother: All-Stars
- Season 22
- Big Brother 22 title card
- Hosted by: Julie Chen Moonves
- No. of days: 85
- No. of houseguests: 16
- Winner: Cody Calafiore
- Runner-up: Enzo Palumbo
- America's Favorite HouseGuest: Da'Vonne Rogers
- Companion show: BB Rewind
- No. of episodes: 37

Release
- Original network: CBS
- Original release: August 5 – October 28, 2020

Season chronology
- ← Previous; Season 21 Next → Season 23

Big Brother 22, also known as Big Brother: All-Stars, is the twenty-second season of the television reality program Big Brother. The season premiered on August 5, 2020, and is broadcast on CBS in the United States and simulcast on Global in Canada. The show chronicles a group of former contestants, known as HouseGuests, as they compete to be the last competitor remaining to win a grand prize of $500,000. Julie Chen Moonves is hosting the season. For the first time since Big Brother: Over the Top, the program featured a live premiere. CBS renewed Big Brother for an additional season on September 5, 2019, before the twenty-first season concluded and confirmed Chen Moonves would be returning as host. The start of the season was delayed six weeks due to the impacts of COVID-19. Hours before the season finale, Julie Chen Moonves made an official announcement for the show's renewal for a twenty-third season in 2021.

The season finale was broadcast on October 28, 2020, after 85 days of competition, where season 16 runner-up Cody Calafiore was named the winner, defeating Enzo Palumbo in a unanimous final jury vote of 9–0. Da'Vonne Rogers was named the season's America's Favorite HouseGuest, winning the $25,000 prize.

== Format ==
Big Brother follows a group of contestants, known as HouseGuests, who live inside a custom-built house outfitted with cameras and microphones recording their every move 24 hours a day. The HouseGuests are sequestered with no contact with the outside world. During their stay, the HouseGuests share their thoughts on their day-to-day lives inside the house in a private room known as the Diary Room. Each week, the HouseGuests compete in competitions in order to win power and safety inside the house. At the start of each week, the HouseGuests compete in a Head of Household (abbreviated as "HOH") competition. The winner of the HoH competition is immune from eviction and selects two HouseGuests to be nominated for eviction. Six HouseGuests are then selected to compete in the Power of Veto (abbreviated as "PoV") competition: the reigning HoH, the nominees, and three other HouseGuests chosen by random draw. The winner of the PoV competition has the right to either revoke the nomination of one of the nominated HouseGuests or leave them as is. If the veto winner uses this power, the HoH must immediately nominate another HouseGuest for eviction. The PoV winner is also immune from being named as the replacement nominee. On eviction night, all HouseGuests vote to evict one of the nominees, though the Head of Household and the nominees are not allowed to vote. This vote is conducted in the privacy of the Diary Room. In the event of a tie, the Head of Household casts the tie-breaking vote. The nominee with the most votes is evicted from the house. The last nine evicted HouseGuests comprise the Jury and are sequestered in a separate location following their eviction and ultimately decide the winner of the season. The Jury is only allowed to see the competitions and ceremonies that include all of the remaining HouseGuests; they are not shown any interviews or other footage that might include strategy or details regarding nominations. The viewing public is able to award an additional prize of $25,000 by choosing "America's Favorite HouseGuest". All evicted HouseGuests are eligible to win this award except for those who either voluntarily leave or are forcibly removed for rule violations.

=== Format changes and additions ===
==== Safety Suite ====
In the second episode, the Safety Suite twist was introduced. For each of the first three weeks, HouseGuests could opt to compete in a competition to earn immunity as well as immunity for one other player. Each HouseGuest could only compete in one of the three safety competitions by scanning the VIP Pass that was given to them on week 1. Once the Suite was activated, those who wanted to participate would have one hour to scan in. The players who chose to participate were revealed to all the remaining HouseGuests. The player who won the Safety Suite competition would be safe for the week and would have to choose a +1 to be safe along with them. However, the +1 would have to accept a unique punishment for the week in addition to immunity.

Week	Competitors	Winner	+1	+1's Punishment
1	Janelle, Kaysar	Kaysar	Janelle	Star Mascot Costume
2	Bayleigh, Christmas, Cody, Da'Vonne, David, Ian, Kevin	Christmas	Ian	BB's All-Star Wars
3	Dani, Enzo, Memphis, Nicole F.	Enzo	Christmas	All-Star Is Born

==== BB Basement ====
During episode 13, Julie revealed a new room in the house called the BB Basement. In this room, a competition would take place that would award three game-changing powers to HouseGuests.

Power	Winner	Description	Outcome
Blocker	Christmas	For the next three weeks, the power holder can prevent themselves or another HouseGuest of their choice from being the replacement nominee at a veto meeting.	Not used (Expired)
Disruptor	David	For the next three weeks, the power holder can save one of the nominees whom the HOH nominates and the HouseGuest chosen is safe for the entire week.	Used on himself (Week 6)
Replay	Dani	For the next three weeks, the outgoing HOH, be it the power holder or a HouseGuest of their choice, could play in the next week's HOH competition.	Used on Memphis (Week 8)

==== Neighbor's Week ====
During episode 22, it was revealed that Big Brother 2 winner and big brother 7 all stars housegust Will Kirby would move into the neighbor's house for the week and tempt the HouseGuests with prizes during the next HOH and veto competitions. Kirby showed up multiple times during the week to shake up the game.

==== Triple Eviction ====
For the first time in the American Big Brother's show history, a triple eviction occurred on day 58, during which the HouseGuests competed in two rounds of play following the first eviction.

== HouseGuests ==
The cast of the twenty-second season of Big Brother: All Stars. From left to right: David, Christmas, Kaysar, Enzo, Cody, Memphis, Bayleigh, Keesha, Janelle, Nicole A., Kevin, Da'Vonne, Dani, Nicole F., Tyler, and Ian

On July 23, 2020, CBS confirmed the season would be an All-Stars edition with previous HouseGuests. This was the second All-Stars edition in the history of the program after the seventh season in 2006. The HouseGuests were revealed during the live season premiere on August 5, 2020. The all-stars in order are Cody Calafiore from Big Brother 16, Enzo from Big Brother 12, Nicole Franzel from Big Brother 16 and who won Big Brother 18, Christmas Abbott from Big Brother 19, Robert "Memphis" Garrett from Big Brother 10, Tyler Crispen from Big Brother 20, Daniele "Dani" Briones from Big Brother 8 and Big Brother 13, David Alexander from Big Brother 21, Kevin Campbell from Big Brother season 11, Da'Vonne Rogers from Big Brother 17 and Big Brother 18, Ian Terry who won Big Brother 14, Bayleigh Dayton from Big Brother 20, Kaysar Ridha from Big Brother 6 and Big Brother 7: All-Stars, Janelle Pierzina from Big Brother 6, Big Brother 7: All-Stars and Big Brother 14, Nicole Anthony from Big Brother 21 and Keesha Smith from Big Brother 10.

Name	Age	Occupation	Residence	Result
Cody Calafiore Big Brother 16	29	Soccer coach	Howell, New Jersey	Winner; Day 85
Vincenzo "Enzo" Palumbo Big Brother 12	42	Insurance adjuster	Bayonne, New Jersey	Runner-up; Day 85
Nicole Franzel Big Brother 16 & Big Brother 18	28	Social media influencer	Ubly, Michigan	Evicted; Day 85
Christmas Abbott Big Brother 19	38	Fitness entrepreneur	Raleigh, North Carolina	Evicted; Day 79
Robert "Memphis" Garrett Big Brother 10	37	Restaurateur	Fort Lauderdale, Florida	Evicted; Day 72
Tyler Crispen Big Brother 20	25	Jewelry company co-owner	Hilton Head Island, South Carolina	Evicted; Day 65
Daniele "Dani" Briones Big Brother 8 & Big Brother 13	33	Stay-at-home mom	Orange County, California	Evicted; Day 58
David Alexander Big Brother 21	30	Senior sales representative	Los Angeles, California	Evicted; Day 58
Kevin Campbell Big Brother 11	40	Ad agency executive	San Diego, California	Evicted; Day 58
Da'Vonne Rogers Big Brother 17 & Big Brother 18	32	Acting coach	Inglewood, California	Evicted; Day 51
Ian Terry Big Brother 14	29	Management consultant	Houston, Texas	Evicted; Day 44
Bayleigh Dayton Big Brother 20	27	Model	Los Angeles, California	Evicted; Day 37
Kaysar Ridha Big Brother 6 & Big Brother 7: All-Stars	39	Biotech executive	Irvine, California	Evicted; Day 30
Janelle Pierzina Big Brother 6, Big Brother 7: All-Stars & Big Brother 14	40	Real estate agent	Minneapolis, Minnesota	Evicted; Day 23
Nicole Anthony Big Brother 21	25	Podcast host	Long Island, New York	Evicted; Day 16
Keesha Smith Big Brother 10	42	Waitress	Los Angeles, California	Evicted; Day 9

=== Future appearances ===
==== The Challenge ====
Enzo Palumbo and David Alexander competed on the first season of The Challenge: USA. Da'Vonne Rogers competed on the fifth season of The Challenge: All Stars.

==== The Traitors ====
Cody Calafiore competed on the first season of the Peacock reality competition series The Traitors. Janelle Pierzina competed on the second season and Ian Terry competed on the fourth season.

==== Big Brother ====
Kaysar Ridha made an appearance on Big Brother 25 where he broadcast messages to houseguests to announce the return of the Pressure Cooker and provided more information on prizes and punishments throughout the competition.

Calafiore alongside Nicole Franzel and Frankie Grande competed on the holiday themed spin-off Big Brother Reindeer Games. Calafiore made an appearance on Big Brother 27 Enzo Palumbo made a appearance in Big brother 28 to host the First Round in order for the houseguests to earn safety Calafiore also made appearance in Big brother 28 to host the second week 8 contest

==== The Amazing Race ====
Palumbo competed on The Amazing Race 38 partnered with his brother.

==== Other shows ====
Rogers appeared on the fifth season of MTV's Ex on the Beach and she competed on the Amazon FreeVee reality competition show, The Goat. Pierzina appeared as a contestant on the USA Network reality competition series Snake in the Grass. In 2026, Alexander competed on the fifth season of The Floor.

== Episodes ==
No. overall	No. in season	Title	Day(s)	Original release date	U.S. viewers (millions)	Rating (18–49)
Week 1
747	1	"Episode 1"	Day 1	August 5, 2020	3.64	1.0
16 All-Star Houseguests entered the house in four groups.: Head of Household Competition: The first HoH competition was played in two rounds.; First Round: Upon entering the house, the move-in groups of four would instantly compete in a competition. In the competition, an item would be shown on a screen in the backyard and HouseGuests would have to find the item in the house. They would then roll a ball through a maze, with the goal of landing the ball in the hole corresponding to the room the item was in. The first two HouseGuests in each heat to complete the puzzle would compete in the second round. Given the live nature of the competition, this competition also had a 4-minute time limit. Should a heat exceed four minutes, then only those who completed the table maze would move to the final round.; In the move-in group of Christmas, Da'Vonne, Dani and Nicole F., only Christmas advanced. Kevin and Ian advanced from the group of them, Tyler and Enzo. Nicole A. advanced from her group of her, Janelle, Keesha and Bayleigh. From the group of Cody, Memphis, David and Kaysar, Cody and Memphis advanced.: Final Round: The players who made it to the final round competed for one-by-one in a live competition. The HouseGuests would each have to race across a series of pedestals and make it to the other side of the yard, locking in their time with a buzzer. Some of these pedestals were not sturdy. If a HouseGuest fell off a pedestal, they would have to restart. The HouseGuest to complete the course in the fastest time would be the new Head of Household.; Cody completed the course fastest and became the first Head of Household of the season. The other five HouseGuest took an envelope each: Christmas won $5,000 while Ian, Kevin, Memphis and Nicole A. were named the first Have-Nots.
748	2	"Episode 2"	Days 1–3	August 9, 2020	2.95	0.8
For the next three weeks, the Safety Suite competition opened for any HouseGuest who wishes to compete for safety from the threat of eviction. Each may only participate in one competition and whoever wins will be granted safety for the week, plus another HouseGuest of their choice will also receive safety, but with a punishment.: Safety Suite Competition ("Don't Miss a Beat"): In this competition, the object was to put together sections of the Twinkle, Twinkle, Little Star remix by pressing seven buttons in the correct order after listening to the whole song. The HouseGuest who completed the task in the fastest time would be declared the winner.; Janelle and Kaysar were the only two HouseGuests to compete. Kaysar beat Janelle and subsequently named her as his +1. Along with her safety, Janelle had to wear a star unitard for her punishment. With two of his potential nominations now immune, Cody decided to put up two people he felt were "outcasts". On Day 2, he nominated Keesha and Kevin for eviction with Keesha as his main target.
749	3	"Episode 3"	Days 3–6	August 12, 2020	4.11	1.1
Alongside Cody, Keesha and Kevin, Enzo, Ian, and Tyler were drawn for the POV.: Power of Veto Competition ("Going Bananas"): Contestants had to rock back and forth on a giant banana to earn 90 seconds to stack the most fruit cutouts they can on a stand. To earn more time, you had to get back on the banana and rock back and forth before the timer reaches 0. If the timer reaches zero or they exceed the 30 minutes total time limit, whichever comes first, they earn zero points and are eliminated. In the contest, only Enzo locked in his stack with 18 items.; Enzo chose not to use the veto, keeping Cody's nominations the same.
750	4	"Episode 4"	Days 6–9	August 13, 2020	4.02	1.0
Cody and Enzo solidified their Final Two alliance, the Root, due to their similar upbringings and play style. Keesha aligned with Janelle and Kaysar, who tried to campaign for her. Keesha herself did a poor job of campaigning while Kevin set himself up in connections with Cody, Da'Vonne, and Nicole A. Ultimately, by a unanimous vote of 13-0, Keesha was the first HouseGuest evicted.: Head of Household Competition ("A Big Brother Watch Party"): The houseguests watched a short video skit of a dysfunctional family's video chat Big Brother watch party. Then Julie would ask the HouseGuest a series of True or False questions, with an incorrect answer resulting in a HouseGuest's elimination from the competition.; Memphis won the competition after six questions, being the only one to answer the sixth question correctly.
Week 2
751	5	"Episode 5"	Days 9–10	August 16, 2020	3.91	1.0
After each week, all of the Have-Nots will each have to name a replacement Have-Not, who can neither be the current Head of Household, nor one of last week's Have-Nots, meaning one cannot be subject to two consecutive weeks of Have-Not restrictions. Memphis chose David, Nicole A. chose Christmas, Nicole F. volunteered for Ian, and Kevin chose Kaysar. Memphis decided to persuade the rest of the HouseGuests to compete in the Safety Suite Competition as a ploy to guarantee that he has a higher chance in winning the following week. Bayleigh, Christmas, Cody, Da'Vonne, David, Ian, and Kevin swiped their VIP Passes to enter the suite to compete.: Safety Suite Competition ("Gettin' Tipsy"): Seven houseguests scanned their VIP passes for entry in this week's safety suite competition. The goal is to place all of the drinks on the corresponding tables in the fastest time. All drinks on the red tray go to the red table, while the drinks on the blue tray go to the blue table. This had to be done in such a way that the tables will balance so that no drink falls off.; Christmas completed the task in the shortest amount of time and won immunity, and gave the +1 to Ian. Ian's punishment was revealed as the "BB All-Star Wars". At various points, a voice would come over the loudspeaker instructing Ian to put his costume on and act out various scenes over the rest of the week. Memphis' allies suggested nominating Janelle and Kaysar, fearing them as a duo. However, Memphis disagreed as the duo was a key piece for him still in the game. At the nomination ceremony, Memphis nominated David and Nicole A.
752	6	"Episode 6"	Days 10–13	August 19, 2020	3.85	1.0
Following the nomination ceremony, the rest of Memphis' alliance felt that his speech belittled David and came across as ignorant. Tyler pulls David aside to cheer him up stating that if he won the Power of Veto, he would use it on David. Later, Ian, Tyler and Nicole F. were chosen to compete alongside Memphis, David, and Nicole A. in the PoV competition.: Power of Veto Competition ("All Starry Night"): Houseguests have to stand on a slanted surface and hold a ball steady on a flat surface held out in front of them. Last person to let the ball fall wins the Power of Veto.; After about half an hour, Memphis won the Power of Veto. At the veto meeting, members of his alliance tried to convince Memphis to use the veto to backdoor the duo of Janelle and Kaysar, while they, mostly Janelle, tried to convince him to backdoor Nicole F. However, Memphis decided not to use the veto, leaving his nominations the same.
753	7	"Episode 7"	Days 13–16	August 20, 2020	3.91	1.0
Nicole A.'s trust with Janelle and Kaysar began to deteriorate as the majority of the house began to convince her that she was being used. Then, by a vote of 10-2, Nicole A. was evicted, with only Enzo and Kevin voting to evict David.: Head of Household Competition ("Mug Shot"): Each Houseguest must push the mugs to the nearest target possible and get most points as they can. The Houseguest with the fastest time and most points wins HOH.; Tyler won with a score of 12 points, barely surpassing Janelle, who had 11.
Week 3
754	8	"Episode 8"	Days 16–17	August 23, 2020	4.12	1.0
Due to Janelle and Kaysar's close ties to Memphis, they talked to Memphis the previous week about an alliance that was forming with Cody, Dani, Nicole F. and Tyler, with no idea that Memphis was in the exact same alliance.: Safety Suite Competition ("Stealing Safety"): Dani, Enzo, Memphis and Nicole F. all competed in the last safety suite competition. The goal is to get past all of the lasers to open the safety vault and bring the large ball all the way back to the beginning without disrupting a laser beam. If hit, the alarm goes off and the player has to rush back to the start and press the button to reset the alarm. The player who makes it back to beginning and hit their button in the fastest time will be safe for the week.; Enzo completed the task the fastest earning him safety for the week and he then give the +1 to Christmas. Christmas' punishment was "All-Star is Born". Throughout the rest of the week, Christmas would receive "star babies" and must carry them around with her wherever she goes. At the nomination ceremony, Tyler nominated Janelle and Kaysar with Janelle as his target.
755	9	"Episode 9"	Days 17–20	August 26, 2020	4.22	1.1
Alongside Tyler, Janelle and Kaysar, Bayleigh, Cody, and Memphis were selected to play in the PoV.: Power Veto Competition: ("Cupcake Clash") HouseGuests competed head-to-head in a randomly drawn tournament to sort out three cupcakes in a Tower of Hanoi pattern. Since there are six players, the fastest of the first round advances to the championship round while the other two winners face head-to-head, with the final two competing in the final round.; Cody won the Power of Veto. With Cody being part of the big alliance, he decided to not use the Power of Veto, feeling like Janelle and Kaysar would come after them given the chance.
756	10	"Episode 10"	Days 20–23	August 27, 2020	3.99	1.0
With the Committee wanting Janelle out, feeling as if she was a bigger physical threat, they all set their eyes on her on eviction night. On Day 23, Janelle was evicted by a vote of 9-2, receiving two hinky votes from Dani and Enzo in an attempt to spur paranoia.: Head of Household Competition: ("Carnival Quick Shot") Houseguests are split into two different groups for this competition. Each group compete in each round by getting all three balls in those holes first. The first three HouseGuest to complete the task moves on to the final round, and the first HouseGuest in the final round wins the competition.; David, Da'Vonne, Enzo, Kaysar, Ian and Nicole F. competed in the first round, while Bayleigh, Cody, Christmas, Dani, Kevin and Memphis will compete second.
Week 4
757	11	"Episode 11"	Days 23–24	August 30, 2020	3.81	0.9
Following Janelle's eviction, this was Kaysar's first time playing Big Brother without her, and he immediately knew he would be targeted next.: Head of Household Competition: ("Carnival Quick Shot") Continuing from the live eviction night on Thursday, the competition was played out to reveal the six winners from the first round, who competed in the final round to determine HOH.; The 6 people that advanced to the final round were Cody, Dani, David, Enzo, Kaysar, and Kevin. Enzo managed to pull the HoH win and secure safety for the week. Although Enzo was not part of the Committee, he was heavily affiliated with them, including a side alliance with Cody, Dani and Nicole called the Core Four, they were able to convince him to target Kaysar for the week. At the nomination ceremony, Enzo nominated Kaysar and Kevin, with Kaysar as his official target and Kevin as the pawn.
758	12	"Episode 12"	Days 24–27	September 2, 2020	4.16	1.1
Alongside Enzo, Kaysar and Kevin, Bayleigh, David, and Tyler were chosen to play in the PoV competition.: Power of Veto Competition: ("Face the Puppetmaster") HouseGuests had to hold on to four ropes, one for each arm and leg and stay there as the ropes were pulled all around. The last HouseGuest remaining won the competition.; Kevin won the Power of Veto. At the veto ceremony, Enzo briefly thought about nominating Ian as a new target, but decided against it, feeling it was too much of a move. He instead nominated Christmas, who had offered herself as a pawn.
759	13	"Episode 13"	Days 27–30	September 3, 2020	4.22	1.1
On eviction night, during the two nominee's pleas, Kaysar took shots at the majority group, but mostly Cody, Dani and Nicole. By a unanimous 10-0 vote, Kaysar was evicted.: Head of Household Competition: ("Filter Faceoff") Houseguests competed in head-to-head rounds and were shown pictures from the Memory Wall, with different filters applied to the Houseguests' faces every round. Julie gave a category and a number and asked whether the amount of photos fitting that category were more, less or exactly the same as stated in the question. If a HouseGuest answered wrong or their opponent got the question correct first, they were eliminated. The winner of each round chose who would compete in the subsequent round, with the last houseguest remaining, winning the competition.; Da'Vonne managed to make it to the final round by winning all of her match-ups, alongside Christmas, who didn't get to answer any questions up to that point. Da'Vonne slipped up at the final question and incorrectly answered, making Christmas the HoH for that week.
Week 5
760	14	"Episode 14"	TBA	September 6, 2020	3.65	0.8
On the previous week, Bayleigh approached Christmas and asked who her "untouchable" was, with Da'Vonne as her own untouchable, which startled Christmas. Prior to the nomination ceremony, the houseguests were informed about the newest twist; the Big Brother Basement, which would replace the Safety Suite competition for that week only.: Special Competition: ("BB Basement") Three game-changing powers were hidden in random places inside the Big Brother basement. Houseguests had to search around in complete darkness among trash and other obstacles for power icons that would fit inside one of the three power podiums. Each person who found a power icon and matched it with the correct podium would receive that special power; however, they would not know what power they had received until after the competition was over. All three powers were eligible to be used once over the next three weeks. Christmas, David, and Dani were the winners.; Christmas received the Blocker Power, which allowed her to prevent either herself or another houseguest of her choice from being named the replacement nominee at one of the next three veto meetings. David earned the Disruptor Power, granting him the ability to save one of the nominees selected by the HOH, and making them safe from eviction for the rest of the week. Dani obtained the Replay Power, granting her the power to allow one of the next three outgoing HOHs, herself included if she became HOH, to participate in the next week's HOH competition along with all the other houseguests. Christmas named Da'Vonne and Bayleigh as her nominations that week.
761	15	"Episode 15"	TBA	September 9, 2020	4.08	1.1
For the Veto competition, the players picked were Christmas, Bayleigh, Da'Vonne, Nicole, Dani and Ian; Ian however was unwell and sat out of the PoV competition under medical advice.: Power of Veto Competition: ("Mathcathlon"): Each participating HouseGuest held onto two red buttons until they saw an equation that equals to 13. The HouseGuest who either gave the correct equation last or incorrect equation first was eliminated but would receive a different reward or punishment depending on performance. The last HouseGuests would win the veto.; Christmas won the Veto, while Bayleigh and Nicole were given punishments, and Dani and Da'Vonne won a Never-Not Pass and $5,000, respectively. Christmas decided not to use the Veto, keeping her nominations the same.
762	16	"Episode 16"	TBA	September 10, 2020	4.07	1.1
Bayleigh was unanimously evicted with a 9-0 vote. Following her eviction, they were informed that the Have-Nots were reset and they will be competing in the Head of Household in conjunction with the Have-Not competition.: Head of Household Competition ("Power Trip"): HouseGuest had to hang onto a billboard for as long as possible. The first three HouseGuest to fall off would be subjected to "Have-Not" for this week, and the last HouseGuest standing wins.
Week 6
763	17	"Episode 17"	TBA	September 13, 2020	4.14	1.1
In the HoH competition that followed, Da’Vonne, David and Ian were the first three HouseGuests eliminated and were the week's Have-Nots. Dani won the competition, and named Kevin and David as the nominees for eviction.
764	18	"Episode 18"	TBA	September 15, 2020	4.13	1.1
David used his Disruptor power to remove himself from the block, granting him safety for the rest of the week; Dani then named Tyler as the replacement nominee.: Power of Veto Competition ("Micro Brew"): Each HouseGuests compete by stacking 15 micro-sized beer cans using tweezers to form a five-level pyramid. The first HouseGuest to complete the challenge wins.; Da’Vonne, Ian and Enzo compete for the veto. Da'Vonne won the Veto and use it to remove Kevin from the block. Dani then named Ian as the replacement nominee.
765	19	"Episode 19"	TBA	September 17, 2020	4.09	1.0
Ian was voted out of the house in a 5-3 vote, with Da'Vonne, David, and Kevin voting in favor of evicting Tyler, making him the first Jury member. Dani, who had the Replay power, was informed that she was allowed to use it on herself if she wished to compete, but she ultimately declined to use the power, thus she was ineligible to compete for the week's Head of Household.: Head of Household Competition ("Hydrant Hustle"): HouseGuest had to collect puzzle pieces and build a fire hydrant puzzle, then press the buzzer once the puzzle is complete. The first HouseGuest to complete the puzzle wins.
Week 7
766	20	"Episode 20"	TBA	September 20, 2020	4.26	1.1
Following the competition, Memphis completes the puzzle first and was named the Head of Household; he nominated Da’Vonne and Kevin as initial eviction nominees. The three Have-Nots were told that they could now choose two HouseGuests would be this week Have-Nots; they chose Christmas and Cody.
767	21	"Episode 21"	TBA	September 23, 2020	4.17	1.2
Power of Veto Competition ("Tiger Zing"): One Houseguest, at a time, entered the maze to find three alien tigers, after finding the tigers, they will have to place those in their proper cages. The HouseGuest who completes the task in the fastest time wins.; Tyler, Nicole and Dani competed for the Veto and Tyler won with 2:55. Tyler chose not to use the veto.
768	22	"Episode 22"	TBA	September 24, 2020	4.21	1.1
During the eviction ceremony, Da'Vonne was evicted 5-2 to Kevin, with the votes except Dani and Nicole, making her the second Jury member. Shortly after the eviction, they were informed that Dr. Will Kirby the winner of big brother season 2 and the fourth place finisher of big brother 7 all stars will pay a visit to the house to offer prizes in the upcoming week of games. They were also informed that the first-ever "Triple Eviction night" will happen following the forthcoming eviction ceremony.
Week 8
769	23	"Episode 23"	TBA	September 27, 2020	4.15	1.0
Head of Household Competition ("Going for the Green"): HouseGuest had three putts to score points ranging from 1 and 21 points. The HouseGuests that putted a lower score on the left would win $10,000 (in the event of a tie, the prize money would be evenly split among other winning players) while the right would win the week's HOH.; Dani and Tyler were tied for the scores in the left and evenly split $10,000; Cody got the lowest score in the right and won the Head, and nominated Kevin and David. Cody and Christmas respectively picked Enzo and Kevin as the next Have-Nots.
770	24	"Episode 24"	TBA	September 30, 2020	4.27	1.0
Power of Veto Competition ("OTEV the Psychic Salamander"): Each HouseGuests would search among a pile of clothes for a tie-dye shirt marked with the names of previously-evicted houseguests as band names. The first HouseGuest to find the correct shirt wins $10,000, but will eliminate the contestant from further play; the last HouseGuest standing wins.; David wins the $10,000 and Cody won the veto. Cody chose not to veto and replace anyone.
771	25	"Episode 25"	TBA	October 1, 2020	4.34	1.2
Kevin was unanimously voted out, making him the third member of the Jury and the first among the three HouseGuests evicted for the night.: Head of Household Competition ("It’s All About Will"): HouseGuests had to answer a series of true-false questions narrated by Kirby. An incorrect answer eliminates the HouseGuest. The last HouseGuest standings wins.; Memphis won the competition and nominated David and Nicole F. for eviction.: Power of Veto Competition ("Ice in Your Veins"): The three HouseGuests have to cross a balance beam and turn their puzzle from a picture of ice veto into a fire veto puzzle and pressing the buzzer. If the HouseGuests fell off the beam the contestant is eliminated. The HouseGuest who either got the puzzle first or is the last one standing wins.; Christmas won the veto but chose not to use hers. In the ceremony that followed, she and Tyler voted for Nicole F., but David was ultimately evicted with the other three votes, making him the fourth member of the Jury.: Head of Household Competition ("It’s All About You"): Similar to the last Head of Household competition, the remaining HouseGuests had to answer a series of true-false questions relating to the competition which narrated by Kirby. An incorrect answer eliminates the HouseGuest. The last HouseGuest standings wins.; Tyler won the competition and nominated Dani and Nicole F. for eviction.: Power of Veto Competition ("Feet to the Fire"): Each HouseGuest have to transfer a piece of puzzle, one at a time, to the puzzle within a balance beam and create a fire-pictured puzzle before they can press the buzzer. If the HouseGuests fell off the beam the contestant is eliminated. The HouseGuest who either got the puzzle first or is the last one standing wins.; Tyler won the veto but chose not to use his. In the ceremony that followed, Dani was unanimously voted off and she become the fifth member of the Jury.
Week 9
772	26	"Episode 26"	TBA	October 5, 2020	3.39	0.9
Head of Household Competition ("Namaste Off the Block"): HouseGuests had to perform various yoga poses while holding on to three buttons. Each time a button is released, the clock then speed up by 10, then 30 and 60. After a certain time, the HouseGuest with more time was eliminated from further play. The HouseGuest with a lower time after the last round wins the HoH.; Christmas was eliminated in the first round, followed by Nicole F., Enzo and Memphis during the next three rounds. In the final round that followed, Cody had a lower time and won the competition, and he named Tyler and Christmas for eviction. Due to the "Triple Eviction Night", the number of Have-Nots were subsequently reduced to one; Enzo picked Nicole F. as the sole Have-Not for the week.
773	27	"Episode 27"	TBA	October 7, 2020	4.10	1.0
Power of Veto Competition ("Snapshot Shuffle"): Each HouseGuest have to retrieve six photos of previously-evicted houseguests at a baseball game and have to arrange them in chronological order. Each HouseGuest had up to 25 minutes to complete the task. The HouseGuest with a fastest time of completion won.; Cody won the veto but chose not to exercise his.
774	28	"Episode 28"	TBA	October 8, 2020	3.99	1.0
Tyler was evicted with a unanimous decision, making him the sixth Jury member. They were also informed the Have-Nots have ended from this point of the competition.: Head of Household Competition ("Stashing Pumpkins"): HouseGuests have to transfer pumpkins from one side to another with a teeter-totter using a basket. If the HouseGuest or any of their pumpkins touch the ground, they have to start all over. The HouseGuest who transfers all the pumpkins first wins.
Week 10
775	29	"Episode 29"	TBA	October 12, 2020	4.03	1.0
Nicole F. won the competition and nominated Christmas and Memphis.
776	30	"Episode 30"	TBA	October 14, 2020	4.19	1.0
Power of Veto Competition ("BB Comics"): Each HouseGuest must zip line by the comic studio window to look at the set of comics on the other side. They must then recreate the set of comics on their computer. However, there are several decoy comics to confuse the HouseGuests. The HouseGuest who replicates the comics on their computer the fastest will win the Power of Veto.; Nicole F. won the competition and the veto but decided not to use hers.
777	31	"Episode 31"	TBA	October 15, 2020	4.01	1.0
Memphis was evicted by a unanimous decision, making him the seventh jury member.
Week 11
778	32	"Episode 32"	TBA	October 19, 2020	3.75	0.9
Head of Household Competition ("Knight Moves"): In a variant of a chess game, each HouseGuest would make their move in a knight piece fashion. Whenever a space was landed on, the space was flipped to red indicating that space could not be landed on again. If it became impossible to make a legal move, the HouseGuest was eliminated from further play. The last HouseGuest to make a legal move wins.; Enzo wins the competition and nominated Nicole F. and Christmas for eviction.
779	33	"Episode 33"	TBA	October 21, 2020	4.18	1.0
Luxury Competition ("Clash of the Comics"): Each HouseGuest chose four comic books and the one HouseGuest that held the winning comic book wins $10,000.; Nicole F. picked the winning comic book and $10,000.: Power of Veto Competition ("The Fast and the Furrious"): Each HouseGuest was stranded in a giant hamster wheel and each revolution move their day counter up by one; if they ran in the opposite direction the counter would increase by five. If the HouseGuest got the question wrong, they incur a strike, and receiving three strikes eliminated the HouseGuest. The last HouseGuest standing wins the season's final veto.; Enzo was eliminated first after four questions, followed by Christmas after the seventh, and Nicole F. on the tenth, leaving Cody the final recipient of the Veto. Cody chose not to exercise his veto and nominations are intact.
780	34	"Episode 34"	Day 74	October 22, 2020	4.12	1.0
Cody chose to evict Christmas and she became the eighth member of the jury.
Week 12
781	35	"Episode 35"	Day 79; Various (Note: In Episode 35, the final three HouseGuests looked back over their time in the Big Brother house. Flashbacks included clips from previous Days in the house, while the current Day in the house was 79.)	October 23, 2020	3.02	0.6
The final three HouseGuests relieved on the past moments over the summer.
782	36	"Episode 36"	Day 80–84	October 26, 2020	3.86	1.0
The final Head-of-Household was split into three rounds. The winner of the first round receives exemption from the second round. The winner of the second round would compete against the winner of the first round while the loser was eliminated. The winner of the third and final round wins the Head of Household and the right to evict a HouseGuest.: Head-of-Household Competition Round 1 ("Big Brother Scary-Go-Round"): HouseGuests will have to stand on tiny swinging disks while getting pelted with slime and rain. If the HouseGuest fell off, he or she would be eliminated. The last HouseGuest standing would win. Nicole won and directly advance to the final round.
783	37	"Episode 37"	Day 85	October 28, 2020	3.91	1.1
Head-of-Household Competition Round 2 ("Camera Hogs"): HouseGuests must take a photo with the evicted HouseGuests that matches the description on a postcard. After placing the cutout of that HouseGuest in front of the postcard backdrop, they must hit their button and take a picture. Pigs were scattered in the play area and can hinder the progress for the HouseGuests. The first HouseGuest to take three clean photos would win.; Cody won the second round of the final HoH under 4:49 (Enzo with 37:38) and compete with Nicole F. in the final round.: Head-of-Household Competition Round 3 ("Vinyl Exam"): The two HouseGuests had to watch a series of videos featuring jury members in order of their eviction. Each jury member made three statements about their time in the Big Brother House, and have to deduce which statement is false. A correct guess earns one point and the HouseGuest earning more points after eight questions would win.; On the first question, Cody answered correctly while Nicole F. was incorrect, and later both HouseGuests answered the remaining questions correctly. In the end, Cody won with 8-7 and thus, winning the final HoH competition, making him the third HouseGuest to reach the Final 2 twice. Deciding to keep the "Final 2" alliance intact, Cody chose to evict Nicole F., making her the last HouseGuest evicted and the ninth and final Jury member. Following her eviction, the Jury of Nine then questioned the finalists on their different games they played during the entire season. They each praised on their strategies and their journeys but also criticized on the treatment towards other HouseGuests. Towards the end of the questions, Enzo rambles and Cody rehashes on their respective games. Later on, it was revealed that the jury unanimously voted Cody to crown him the winner of the season and the $500,000 top prize. Minutes later, Da'Vonne was voted by the public as the season's America's Favorite HouseGuest and the $25,000 prize, with Tyler being the next closest contender for the award.

== Voting history ==
Color key:

Winner
Runner-up
Head of Household
Nominated for eviction
Immune from eviction
Won Immunity via competition
Evicted

Voting history (season 22)
	Week 1	Week 2	Week 3	Week 4	Week 5	Week 6	Week 7	Week 8			Week 9	Week 10	Week 11	Week 12	
	Week 1	Week 2	Week 3	Week 4	Week 5	Week 6	Week 7	Day 52	Day 58 (Note: Day 58 was a triple eviction night. Following the first eviction, the remaining HouseGuests played two weeks' worth of games – including Head of Household and veto competitions; and nomination, veto, and eviction ceremonies – during the live show, culminating in a second and third eviction for the week.)		Week 9	Week 10	Week 11	Day 85	Finale
Head of Household	Cody	Memphis	Tyler	Enzo	Christmas	Dani	Memphis	Cody	Memphis	Tyler	Cody	Nicole F.	Enzo	Cody	(None)
Room winner	Kaysar (Note: Kaysar won the Safety Suite Competition, thereby winning immunity for himself and one other player of his choice. Kaysar chose to give immunity to Janelle.) (Janelle)	Christmas (Note: Christmas won the Safety Suite Competition, thereby winning immunity for herself and one other player of her choice. Christmas chose to give immunity to Ian.) (Ian)	Enzo (Note: Enzo won the Safety Suite Competition, thereby winning immunity for himself and one other player of his choice. Enzo chose to give immunity to Christmas.) (Christmas)	(None)	Christmas; Dani; David	(None)								(None)	(None)
Nominations (initial)	Keesha; Kevin	David; Nicole A.	Janelle; Kaysar	Kaysar; Kevin	Bayleigh; Da'Vonne	~~David~~ (Note: After the nomination ceremony, David privately played his disruptor power on himself, thereby cancelling his nomination and granting him immunity for the week. Dani nominated Tyler in his place.); Kevin; Tyler	Da'Vonne; Kevin	David; Kevin	David; Nicole F.	Dani; Nicole F.	Christmas; Tyler	Christmas; Memphis	Christmas; Nicole F.	(None)	(None)
Veto winner	Enzo	Memphis	Cody	Kevin	Christmas	Da'Vonne	Tyler	Cody	Christmas	Tyler	Cody	Nicole F.	Cody	(None)	(None)
Nominations (final)	Keesha; Kevin	David; Nicole A.	Janelle; Kaysar	Christmas; Kaysar	Bayleigh; Da'Vonne	Ian; Tyler	Da'Vonne; Kevin	David; Kevin	David; Nicole F.	Dani; Nicole F.	Christmas; Tyler	Christmas; Memphis	Christmas; Nicole F.	Enzo; Nicole F.	(None)
Cody	Head of Household	Nicole A.	Janelle	Kaysar	Bayleigh	Ian	Da'Vonne	Head of Household	David	Dani	Head of Household	Memphis	Christmas	Nicole F. (Note: As Head of Household, Cody chose to evict Nicole F.)	Winner
Enzo	Keesha	David	Kaysar	Head of Household	Bayleigh	Ian	Da'Vonne	Kevin	David	Dani	Tyler	Memphis	Head of Household	Nominated	Runner-up
Nicole F.	Keesha	Nicole A.	Janelle	Kaysar	Bayleigh	Ian	Kevin	Kevin	Nominated	Nominated	Tyler	Head of Household	Nominated	Evicted (Day 85)	Cody
Christmas	Keesha	Nicole A.	Janelle	Nominated	Head of Household	Ian	Da'Vonne	Kevin	Nicole F.	Dani	Nominated	Nominated	Nominated	Evicted (Day 79)	Cody
Memphis	Keesha	Head of Household	Janelle	Kaysar	Bayleigh	Ian	Head of Household	Kevin	Head of Household	Dani	Tyler	Nominated	Evicted (Day 72)		Cody
Tyler	Keesha	Nicole A.	Head of Household	Kaysar	Bayleigh	Nominated	Da'Vonne	Kevin	Nicole F.	Head of Household	Nominated	Evicted (Day 65)			Cody
Dani	Keesha	Nicole A.	Kaysar	Kaysar	Bayleigh	Head of Household	Kevin	Kevin	David	Nominated	Evicted (Day 58)				Cody
David	Keesha	Nominated	Janelle	Kaysar	Bayleigh	Tyler	Da'Vonne	Nominated	Nominated	Evicted (Day 58)					Cody
Kevin	Nominated	David	Janelle	Kaysar	Bayleigh	Tyler	Nominated	Nominated	Evicted (Day 58)						Cody
Da'Vonne	Keesha	Nicole A.	Janelle	Kaysar	Nominated	Tyler	Nominated	Evicted (Day 51)							Cody
Ian	Keesha	Nicole A.	Janelle	Kaysar	Bayleigh	Nominated	Evicted (Day 44)								Cody
Bayleigh	Keesha	Nicole A.	Janelle	Kaysar	Nominated	Evicted (Day 37)									
Kaysar	Keesha	Nicole A.	Nominated	Nominated	Evicted (Day 30)										
Janelle	Keesha	Nicole A.	Nominated	Evicted (Day 23)											
Nicole A.	Keesha	Nominated	Evicted (Day 16)												
Keesha	Nominated	Evicted (Day 9)													
Evicted	Keesha; 13 of 13 votes to evict	Nicole A. 10 of 12 votes to evict	Janelle; 9 of 11 votes to evict	Kaysar; 10 of 10 votes to evict	Bayleigh; 9 of 9 votes to evict	Ian; 5 of 8 votes to evict	Da'Vonne; 5 of 7 votes to evict	Kevin; 6 of 6 votes to evict	David; 3 of 5 votes to evict	Dani; 4 of 4 votes to evict	Tyler; 3 of 3 votes to evict	Memphis; 2 of 2 votes to evict	Christmas; Cody's choice to evict	Nicole F. Cody's choice to evict	Enzo; 0 votes to win
Evicted	Keesha; 13 of 13 votes to evict	Nicole A. 10 of 12 votes to evict	Janelle; 9 of 11 votes to evict	Kaysar; 10 of 10 votes to evict	Bayleigh; 9 of 9 votes to evict	Ian; 5 of 8 votes to evict	Da'Vonne; 5 of 7 votes to evict	Kevin; 6 of 6 votes to evict	David; 3 of 5 votes to evict	Dani; 4 of 4 votes to evict	Tyler; 3 of 3 votes to evict	Memphis; 2 of 2 votes to evict	Christmas; Cody's choice to evict	Nicole F. Cody's choice to evict	Cody; 9 votes to win

== Production ==
=== Impacts of COVID-19 ===
Dates for open casting calls were announced on February 28 and were due to start on March 7. All open casting calls were cancelled on March 10 due to concerns over the COVID-19 pandemic however potential applicants were urged to continue submitting online applications. An article from The Hollywood Reporter on April 7 noted that CBS would be without new seasons of Big Brother and Love Island during the summer. Unnamed sources to the publication said the network would rely on repeats of their scripted shows that "have historically repeated well." In a May 19 interview with Deadline, CBS Entertainment President Kelly Kahl said the network was "optimistic" about airing both shows (Big Brother and Love Island) during the summer "a little later than usual." Pre-production began on July 2 with the crew starting construction on the house located in Los Angeles. Deadline reported the crew was following strict health and safety guidelines which including being tested for COVID-19, wearing personal protective equipment and observing social distancing during construction. Fly on the Wall Entertainment and Endemol Shine North America, which co-produce the series, had to wait for approvals from unions and guilds to officially begin filming. CBS revealed several changes to the program to ensure the health and safety of the HouseGuests, staff and production crew. Prior to the season premiere, the HouseGuests were placed in quarantine and tested for COVID-19 multiple times. Once inside the House, the HouseGuests would be tested weekly and have no contact with the production crew and any supplies delivered to the House would be disinfected. The production crew and staff would also be tested regularly and screened for symptoms, provided personal protective equipment and work in socially distant pods. A COVID-19 compliance officer will be on staff to ensure the implementation of the safety policies. Additionally, the live shows would not have a live studio audience, for the first time since Big Brother 9.

=== Development ===
CBS announced Big Brother had been renewed for a twenty-second season on September 5, 2019. Chen Moonves confirmed to return as host on the same day after signing a one-season contract extension with the network. Merchandise for the upcoming season briefly appeared on CBS' online store on July 20, 2020, featuring the title Big Brother: All-Stars with a redesigned logo. Allison Grodner and Rich Meehan will return as executive producers for the series which will be produced by Fly on the Wall Entertainment, in association with Endemol Shine North America. CBS announced the season would have a live two-hour premiere on August 5, 2020. For the first time since Big Brother: Over the Top this season will feature the HouseGuests moving into the House during live premiere. New episodes will air on Sunday/Wednesday/Thursday schedule as in previous seasons except all episodes will air in the 8:00 p.m. timeslot. Global will air the season in Canada in simulcast with CBS.

=== Casting ===
Kassting, Inc. returned to provide casting services for a 21st consecutive season since Big Brother 2, with Robyn Kass serving as the casting director. Despite the eventual "All-Stars" format, an open casting call for the season was still held, which opened on September 22, 2019, and closed on April 3, 2020.

=== Filming ===
As with previous seasons, the program is filmed at CBS Studios, soundstage 18 in Studio City, California in a custom-built two-story house. The House is equipped with 94 high-definition cameras and over 113 microphones to monitor and record the HouseGuests.

=== Production design ===
The theme of the house is a modern colorful urban loft that showcases Big Brother history. Like the previous All-Star house, the new house contains many references to past players and moments of the series. Spray-painted murals in the kitchen area depict memorable moments from popular former HouseGuests, including:

- Danielle Reyes miming devil horns in her Diary Room sessions along with her countdown towards her goal of reaching the end, "1 down, 8 to go" (from Big Brother 3).
- Dan Gheesling is depicted during his infamous "funeral" (from Big Brother 14);
- Will Kirby is featured and labeled as a "puppet master" (from Big Brother 2 & Big Brother 7);
- Derrick Levasseur's "undercover" gameplay that alludes to his occupation as an undercover police officer (from Big Brother 16);
- Rachel Reilly's popular battlecry of "Floaters, [you better] grab a life vest" (from Big Brother 12); and
- Kaycee Clark is featured with her frequently vocalized catchphrase "Let's go!" (from Big Brother 20).

The lounge features toss pillows of the show's multiple popular "showmances," including Jeff/Jordan (from Big Brother 11 and Big Brother 13), Cody/Jessica (from Big Brother 19), Brendon/Rachel (from Big Brother 12 and Big Brother 13), Dominic/Daniele (from Big Brother 13), Swaggy C/Bayleigh (from Big Brother 20), Tyler/Angela (from Big Brother 20), and Victor/Nicole (from Big Brother 18). The first bedroom is a comic themed room that alludes to the recurring Power of Veto competition BB Comics. The walls of this room includes images of the BB Comics characters of multiple past HouseGuests, including Victor Arroyo (of Big Brother 18), Amber Borzotra (of Big Brother 16), Frank Eudy (of Big Brother 14 and Big Brother 18), Jessica Graf (of Big Brother 19), Frankie Grande (of Big Brother 16), Ovi Kabir (of Big Brother 21), Jordan Lloyd (of Big Brother 11 & Big Brother 13), Steve Moses (of Big Brother 17), Rachel Reilly (of Big Brother 12 and Big Brother 13), Vanessa Rousso (of Big Brother 17), Angela Rummans (of Big Brother 20), Faysal Shafaat (of Big Brother 20), Devin Shepherd (of Big Brother 16), Christopher "Swaggy C" Williams (of Big Brother 20) and Jase Wirey (of Big Brother 5 and Big Brother 7). The second bedroom is themed around cameras, the walls of this bedroom is filled with "127 black-and-white photos that highlight pivotal moments spanning the show’s 20-year history". The third bedroom is themed around the Big Brother key, the symbol of safety in the Big Brother house as used in the nomination ceremony and in the Final 2 jury vote. The bathroom features rubber ducks which have been frequently seen in the pool. This season also featured an updated front of house studio for the first time since Big Brother 15, featuring a new 10-foot-tall entrance door as well as a hallway to prevent houseguests from peeking beyond the door, a trope that has caught on in recent years.

== Reception ==
=== Critical response ===
During Week 5, Memphis Garrett, Nicole Franzel, Dani Briones, and Christmas Abbott made fun of Ian Terry's rocking coping mechanism for being on the autism spectrum. Dani stated, "I can't even look at him sometimes because [of] his constant movement. It stresses me out. I feel mean saying that, but I'll literally have to move." Memphis and Christmas joined in, with Memphis comparing Ian's demeanor to that of a horror movie. Multiple houseguests were also involved in the matter, including Cody Calafiore and Enzo Palumbo. These houseguests laughed when comments were made, but did not directly make comments about Terry.

Additionally, Christmas Abbott faced criticism for making a racist comment about African-American houseguest Bayleigh Dayton, claiming that Dayton would "shoot" her if Abbott were to nominate her for eviction. Many fans expressed disgust with Abbott's actions, accusing her of promoting racial stereotypes about African-Americans.

=== Viewing figures ===
==== United States ====
Viewership and ratings per episode of Big Brother 22
No.	Title	Air date	Timeslot (ET)	Rating (18–49)	Viewers (millions)	DVR (18–49)	DVR viewers (millions)	Total (18–49)	Total viewers (millions)	Ref.
1	"Episode 1"	August 5, 2020	Wednesday 9:00 p.m.	1.0	3.64	0.7	1.94	1.8	5.60	
2	"Episode 2"	August 9, 2020	Sunday 10:07 p.m.^{1}	0.8	2.95	0.7	2.16	1.5	5.13	
3	"Episode 3"	August 12, 2020	Wednesday 8:00 p.m.	1.1	4.11	0.5	1.45	1.6	5.57	
4	"Episode 4"	August 13, 2020	Thursday 8:00 p.m.	1.0	4.02	0.5	1.33	1.5	5.37	
5	"Episode 5"	August 16, 2020	Sunday 8:00 p.m.	1.0	3.91	0.6	1.58	1.6	5.50	
6	"Episode 6"	August 19, 2020	Wednesday 8:00 p.m.	1.0	3.85	0.4	1.16	1.4	5.03	
7	"Episode 7"	August 20, 2020	Thursday 8:00 p.m.	1.0	3.91	0.4	1.26	1.4	5.18	
8	"Episode 8"	August 23, 2020	Sunday 8:00 p.m.	1.0	4.12	TBD	TBD	TBD	TBD	
9	"Episode 9"	August 26, 2020	Wednesday 8:00 p.m.	1.1	4.22	TBD	TBD	TBD	TBD	
10	"Episode 10"	August 27, 2020	Thursday 8:00 p.m.	1.0	3.99	TBD	TBD	TBD	TBD	
11	"Episode 11"	August 30, 2020	Sunday 8:00 p.m.	0.9	3.81	TBD	TBD	TBD	TBD	
12	"Episode 12"	September 2, 2020	Wednesday 8:00 p.m.	1.1	4.15	TBD	TBD	TBD	TBD	
13	"Episode 13"	September 3, 2020	Thursday 8:00 p.m.	1.1	4.22	TBD	TBD	TBD	TBD	
14	"Episode 14"	September 6, 2020	Sunday 8:00 p.m.	0.8	3.65	TBD	TBD	TBD	TBD	
15	"Episode 15"	September 9, 2020	Wednesday 8:00 p.m.	1.1	4.08	TBD	TBD	TBD	TBD	
16	"Episode 16"	September 10, 2020	Thursday 8:00 p.m.	1.1	4.07	TBD	TBD	TBD	TBD	
17	"Episode 17"	September 13, 2020	Sunday 8:00 p.m.	1.1	4.14	TBD	TBD	TBD	TBD	
18	"Episode 18"	September 15, 2020^{2}	Tuesday 8:00 p.m.	1.1	4.13	TBD	TBD	TBD	TBD	
19	"Episode 19"	September 17, 2020	Thursday 8:00 p.m.	1.0	4.09	TBD	TBD	TBD	TBD	
20	"Episode 20"	September 20, 2020	Sunday 8:50 p.m.^{3}	1.1	4.26	TBD	TBD	TBD	TBD	
21	"Episode 21"	September 23, 2020	Wednesday 8:00 p.m.	1.2	4.17	0.3	1.07	1.5	5.27	
22	"Episode 22"	September 24, 2020	Thursday 8:00 p.m.	1.1	4.21	0.4	0.98	1.5	5.21	
23	"Episode 23"	September 27, 2020	Sunday 8:00 p.m.	1.0	4.15	0.4	1.24	1.4	5.40	
24	"Episode 24"	September 30, 2020	Wednesday 8:00 p.m.	1.0	4.27	TBD	TBD	TBD	TBD	
25	"Episode 25"	October 1, 2020	Thursday 8:00 p.m.	1.2	4.34	TBD	TBD	TBD	TBD	
26	"Episode 26"	October 5, 2020	Monday 9:50 p.m.	0.9	3.39	0.5	1.27	1.4	4.66	
27	"Episode 27"	October 7, 2020	Wednesday 8:00 p.m.	1.0	4.10	TBD	TBD	TBD	TBD	
28	"Episode 28"	October 8, 2020	Thursday 8:00 p.m.	1.0	3.99	TBD	TBD	TBD	TBD	
29	"Episode 29"	October 12, 2020	Monday 8:00 p.m.	1.0	4.03	TBD	TBD	TBD	TBD	
30	"Episode 30"	October 14, 2020	Wednesday 8:00 p.m.	1.0	4.19	TBD	TBD	TBD	TBD	
31	"Episode 31"	October 15, 2020	Thursday 8:00 p.m.	1.0	4.01	TBD	TBD	TBD	TBD	
32	"Episode 32"	October 19, 2020	Monday 8:00 p.m.	0.9	3.75	TBD	TBD	TBD	TBD	
33	"Episode 33"	October 21, 2020	Wednesday 8:00 p.m.	1.0	4.18	TBD	TBD	TBD	TBD	
34	"Episode 34"	October 22, 2020	Thursday 8:00 p.m.	1.0	4.12	TBD	TBD	TBD	TBD	
35	"Episode 35"	October 23, 2020	Friday 8:00 p.m.	0.6	3.02	TBD	TBD	TBD	TBD	
36	"Episode 36"	October 26, 2020	Monday 8:00 p.m.	1.0	3.86	TBD	TBD	TBD	TBD	
37	"Episode 37"	October 28, 2020	Wednesday 9:00 p.m.	1.1	3.91	TBD	TBD	TBD	TBD	

- ^Note 1: Episode 2 was delayed to 10:07 pm ET (9:07 pm CT) due to the 2020 PGA Championship golf event running long.
- ^Note 2: Episode 18 was moved to Tuesday, September 15 due to the 55th Academy of Country Music Awards being rescheduled from April due to the impacts of COVID-19.
- ^Note 3: Episode 20 was delayed to 8:50 pm ET (7:50 pm CT) due to the Kansas City Chiefs-Los Angeles Chargers game running long.

==== Canada ====
Viewership and ratings per episode of Big Brother 22
No.	Title	Air date	Timeslot (ET)	Viewers (millions)	Ref.
1	"Episode 1"	August 5, 2020	Wednesday 9:00 p.m.	1.16	
2	"Episode 2"	August 9, 2020	Sunday 10:00 p.m.	1.11	
3	"Episode 3"	August 12, 2020	Wednesday 8:00 p.m.	1.17	
4	"Episode 4"	August 13, 2020	Thursday 8:00 p.m.	1.06	
5	"Episode 5"	August 16, 2020	Sunday 8:00 p.m.	1.05	
6	"Episode 6"	August 19, 2020	Wednesday 8:00 p.m.	0.97	
7	"Episode 7"	August 20, 2020	Thursday 8:00 p.m.	1.03	
8	"Episode 8"	August 23, 2020	Sunday 8:00 p.m.	0.98	
9	"Episode 9"	August 26, 2020	Wednesday 8:00 p.m.	1.17	
10	"Episode 10"	August 27, 2020	Thursday 8:00 p.m.	1.08	
11	"Episode 11"	August 30, 2020	Sunday 8:00 p.m.	1.07	
