= Janelle Pierzina =

American reality show personality (born 1980)

- Born: Janelle Marie Pierzina; January 10, 1980 (age 46); Grand Rapids, Minnesota, U.S.
- Occupation: Television personality
- Years active: 2001–present
- Television: Big Brother; The Amazing Race; Snake in the Grass (co-winner); The Traitors
- Spouse: Jess DeSanto (m. 2010)
- Children: 3

Janelle Marie Pierzina (born January 10, 1980) is an American reality television personality known for her appearances on the sixth, seventh, fourteenth, and twenty-second seasons of the reality show Big Brother, the thirty-first season of The Amazing Race, and the second season of The Traitors. In 2022, Pierzina was a co-winner of the USA Network competition series Snake in the Grass.

== Career ==
=== 2005–2022: Appearances in reality television shows ===
In 2005, Pierzina was one of fourteen contestants on Big Brother 6. Her secret partner was former roommate, Ashlea Evans. Pierzina came in third, being evicted on September 16, 2005, Day 76. Pierzina also starred in the documentary Nautical Angels. Before appearing on Big Brother, Pierzina was an actress, model, and cocktail waitress.

In the summer of 2006, Pierzina was chosen by the viewers to participate in Big Brother 7: All-Stars and entered the house on July 3, 2006. Pierzina was eventually evicted on Day 67, again taking third place and becoming a member of the seven-contestant jury. On September 12, 2006, the final day of Big Brother 7: All-Stars, Pierzina was named the winner of the final America's Choice vote, a $25,000 prize to a jury member. Popular with fans, Pierzina won every America's Choice award during Big Brother 6.

In September, 2007, Pierzina returned to host the Power Of Veto competition in the Big Brother 8 house. On August 9, 2008, in the Big Brother 10 house, Pierzina again returned to participate in the week's food competition. Along with other BB alumni, including Mike "Boogie" Malin and Danielle Reyes, Janelle returned to Big Brother in September 2009 for a roundtable discussion of Big Brother 11.

In 2012, Pierzina returned once again to the Big Brother house for the show's 14th season. She was the fourth contestant evicted.

After her appearance on Big Brother All Stars, Pierzina won the VH1 Big Reality Star of '06 award. She was named the biggest "winner" of Big Brother by BuddyTV based on number of combined Head of Household and Power of Veto competition victories during her first two seasons with 12.5.

She competed on the 31st season of The Amazing Race with her teammate Britney Haynes, another former contestant from Big Brother. They were the fourth team eliminated from the race.

In August 2020, it was announced that Pierzina would once again be a houseguest for Big Brother 22: All-Stars, which is also the series' second All-Stars season. She was the third contestant to be evicted.

In 2022, Pierzina appeared on the reality competition series Snake in the Grass, where she competed with teammates Rachel Reilly, Cirie Fields, and Stephenie LaGrossa Kendrick. She was the co-winner with Fields and Reilly.

== Personal life ==
In 2000, Pierzina was convicted of a misdemeanor DWI infraction in Minnesota, for which she was fined and sent to an alcohol-awareness program. In 2001 she was charged with and pleaded guilty to misdemeanor theft from Macy's, for which she was fined.

Pierzina is now a real estate agent in Minnesota for Edina Realty.

In August 2013, Pierzina gave birth to her second child, a boy. In April 2014, Pierzina confirmed that she was expecting her third child. In September 2014, she gave birth to a girl.

== Filmography ==
Film roles
Year	Title	Role	Notes
2002	Like Mike	Cheerleader #13	
2003	Bruce Almighty	Woman at party	

Television roles
Year	Title	Role	Notes
2001	Friends	Patron in coffee shop	Season 8, episode 10: "The One with Monica's Boots"; uncredited
2002	Charmed	Woman on Wizard's Lap	Season 4, episode 19: "We're Off to See the Wizard"; uncredited
2002	Son of the Beach	Girl on beach	Season 3, episode 14: "Bad News, Mr. Johnson"; uncredited
2004	Las Vegas	Van Damme's girlfriend	Season 1, episode 15: "Die Fast, Die Furious"
2005–2020	Big Brother	Herself	Seasons 6, 7, 8, 10, 11, 14, 22; 89 episodes
2005	Nautical Angels	Herself	Documental
2013	Big Brother Canada	Herself	Season 1, episode 23
2019	The Amazing Race	Herself	Season 31, episodes 1–8, 11
2022	Snake in the Grass	Herself	Season 1, episode 5: "Survivor vs. Big Brother"
2024	The Traitors	Herself	Season 2

== Awards and nominations ==
Year	Award	Result	Category	Work
2006	Fox Reality Awards	Nominated	Favorite Hottie	Big Brother 7: All-Stars
2006	VH1 Big Awards	Won	Big Reality Star	Big Brother 7: All-Stars
