= Big Brother 14 (American season) =

Coordinates: 34°8′40.12″N 118°23′20.71″W

Big Brother
- Season 14
- Big Brother 14 title card
- Hosted by: Julie Chen
- No. of days: 75
- No. of houseguests: 16
- Winner: Ian Terry
- Runner-up: Dan Gheesling
- America's Favorite HouseGuest: Frank Eudy
- Companion shows: Big Brother: Live Chat; Big Brother: After Dark
- No. of episodes: 30

Release
- Original network: CBS
- Original release: July 12 – September 19, 2012

Additional information
- Filming dates: July 7 – September 19, 2012

Season chronology
- ← Previous; Season 13 Next → Season 15

Big Brother 14 is the fourteenth season of the American reality television series Big Brother. The season premiered on July 12, 2012, broadcast on CBS, and ended with a 90-minute season finale on September 19, 2012, after 75 days of competition. Julie Chen returned as host. On September 19, 2012, Ian Terry was crowned the winner defeating season 10 winner Dan Gheesling in a 6-1 jury vote, earning the latter the distinction of being the first person to reach the Final Two twice. Frank Eudy was voted as the season's America's Favorite HouseGuest.

== Format ==
HouseGuests were sequestered in the Big Brother House with no contact to or from the outside world. Each week, the HouseGuests took part in several compulsory challenges that determine who will win food, luxuries, and power in the House. The winner of the weekly Head of Household competition was immune from nominations and nominated two fellow HouseGuests for eviction. After a HouseGuest became Head of Household, he or she was ineligible to take part in the next Head of Household competition. The winner of the Power of Veto competition won the right to save one of the nominated HouseGuests from eviction. If the Veto winner exercised the power, the Head of Household then nominated another HouseGuest for eviction.

On eviction night, all HouseGuests except for the Head of Household and the two nominees vote to evict one of the two nominees. This compulsory vote was conducted in the privacy of the Diary Room by the host Julie Chen. In the event of a tie, the Head of Household cast the deciding vote, announcing it in front of the other HouseGuests. Unlike other versions of Big Brother, the HouseGuests may discuss the nomination and eviction process openly and freely. The nominee with the greater number of votes will be evicted from the House on the live Thursday broadcast, exiting to an adjacent studio to be interviewed by Chen. HouseGuests may voluntarily leave the House at any time and those who break the rules may be expelled from the house by Big Brother. The final seven HouseGuests evicted during the season will vote for the winner on the season finale. These "Jury Members" will be sequestered in a separate house and will not be allowed to watch the show except for competitions and ceremonies that include all of the remaining HouseGuests. The jury members will not be shown any Diary Room interviews or any footage that may include strategy or details regarding nominations. This season was the first to have two double eviction nights. It was also the first to have two vetoes at one veto ceremony.

=== Coaches ===
In a change from past seasons, four former HouseGuests from past seasons of Big Brother returned to coach the new HouseGuests during their time in the House. Each coach had to pick three of the new HouseGuests that they will guide throughout the entire game. When a HouseGuests wins Head of Household the coach of that Housemate will also gain their own private room adjacent to the Head of Household bedroom. The coaches compete in a new competition that replaces Have vs. Have-Not competition for the season. The winning coach is granted the power to give one of their players immunity for the week or to trade one of their players for a player from another team. Depending on the rules of the coach's competition, each coach then has to choose one of their own players to become a "Have Not" for the week or the winning coach has the opportunity of choosing all of the "Have Nots". HouseGuests that are chosen to be "Have Nots" for the week had to eat "Big Brother slop" and a weekly food restriction (chosen by the viewing public), take cold showers, and sleep on hard beds.

=== Prizes ===
The 12 HouseGuests this season were competing for the main prize of $500,000, whereas the prize was determined by the votes cast from the Jury of Seven, which consist of seven previously evicted HouseGuests; the Runner-Up won a $50,000 prize. Other than the main prize, various luxuries and prizes were given out throughout the season.

The four Coaches were competing for a separate $100,000 cash award if their chosen HouseGuest from the team was named the winner. However, on Week 3, America voted to allow the coaches to vote whether to keep coaching or become HouseGuests. Three of four voted to reset the game and became full HouseGuests, meaning the coaches were now eligible for the standard $500,000 grand prize.

The America's Favorite HouseGuest (which was first introduced in the finale of season 7) was awarded for the season's fan favorite HouseGuest for a $25,000 prize. While all HouseGuests were allowed to run for the award, Willie Hantz's ejection on Day 14 revoked his eligibility for the award.

== HouseGuests ==
A total of sixteen HouseGuests entered the house. On July 4, 2012, four television advertisements were released throughout the day, revealing eleven names of the HouseGuests, The full cast of twelve HouseGuests was revealed on July 5, which included Willie Hantz, the brother of three-time Survivor player Russell Hantz. The four returning HouseGuests from previous seasons were revealed during the season premiere on July 12. However, unlike in previous seasons where the returning players competed as regular HouseGuests, these coaches were tasked with coaching three of the new players each wherein the coach of the winning HouseGuest would win a separate prize of $100,000. If a coach were to have all of their HouseGuests evicted, they will also be evicted from the house.

After the Week 2 live eviction, the viewers were given the option to either give the coaches a chance to return to the game as regular HouseGuests or to retain their coach status. The viewers voted to allow the coaches to return to the game with three of four coaches accepting the offer, which resulted in the cancellation of the Week 3 eviction. The returnees/coaches were Dan Gheesling who won Big Brother 10, Britney Haynes from Big Brother 12, Mike "Boogie" Malin from Big Brother 2 and the winner of Big Brother 7: All-Stars and Janelle Pierzina who was the third place finisher of both Big Brother 6 and Big Brother 7: All-Stars.

Name	Age	Occupation	Residence	Day entered	Result
Ian Terry	21	Engineering student	New Orleans, Louisiana	1	Winner; Day 75
Dan Gheesling Big Brother 10	28	High school teacher	West Bloomfield, Michigan	27	Runner-up; Day 75
Danielle Murphree	23	Nurse	Tuscaloosa, Alabama	1	Evicted; Day 75
Shane Meaney	26	House flipper	Bennington, Vermont	1	Evicted; Day 69
Jenn Arroyo	37	Musician	Brooklyn, New York	1	Evicted; Day 67
Joe Arvin	41	Chef	Schererville, Indiana	1	Evicted; Day 62
Frank Eudy	28	Unemployed	Naples, Florida	1	Evicted; Day 62
Britney Haynes Big Brother 12	24	Pharmaceutical sales representative	Tulsa, Oklahoma	27	Evicted; Day 55
Ashley Iocco	26	Mobile spray tan company owner	West Hollywood, California	1	Evicted; Day 48
Mike "Boogie" Malin Big Brother 2 & Big Brother 7: All-Stars	41	Restaurant owner	Studio City, California	27	Evicted; Day 48
Wil Heuser	24	Marketing consultant	Louisville, Kentucky	1	Evicted; Day 41
Janelle Pierzina Big Brother 6 & Big Brother 7: All-Stars	32	Housewife	Lakeville, Minnesota	27	Evicted; Day 34
Josephine "JoJo" Spatafora	26	Bartender	Great Kills, New York	1	Evicted; Day 20
Willie Hantz	34	Tankerman	Dayton, Texas	1	Expelled; Day 14
Kara Monaco	29	Model	Los Angeles, California	1	Evicted; Day 13
Jodi Rollins	42	Server	Calipatria, California	1	Evicted; Day 1

=== Future appearances ===
Frank Eudy was one of the four returning HouseGuests on Big Brother 18. Jodi Rollins made a brief cameo appearance on the first season of Celebrity Big Brother. Britney Haynes returned for Big Brother 20, where she celebrated the engagement of Nicole Franzel and Victor Arroyo. Britney Haynes and Janelle Pierzina competed as a team on The Amazing Race 31.

In 2020, both Ian Terry and Janelle Pierzina returned to compete on Big Brother: All-Stars. In 2022, Pierzina appeared as a contestant on the USA Network reality competition series, Snake in the Grass. In 2023, Britney Haynes made brief appearances in the premiere and finale episodes of Big Brother 25. Later that year, Haynes competed on Big Brother Reindeer Games. In 2024, Janelle Pierzina and Dan Gheesling appeared on the second season of the American version of the reality TV series The Traitors, on Peacock. In 2025, Haynes competed on the third season of The Traitors. In 2026, Terry competed on the fourth season of The Traitors.

== Summary ==
On the first night, twelve new HouseGuests entered the Big Brother House to two new twists of the season. The first twist was that four successful ex-HouseGuests would re-enter the House not to compete against one another, but to coach the new HouseGuests. Their job is to guide the HouseGuests for as long as they can, hoping to keep coaching a possible winner. The winner's coach would win a special $100,000 prize at the end of the season. Soon after the announcement, Dan Gheesling from Big Brother 10, Britney Haynes from Big Brother 12, Mike "Boogie" Malin from Big Brother 2 and Big Brother 7: All Stars, and Janelle Pierzina from Big Brother 6 and Big Brother 7: All Stars entered the House. On the second twist of the night, HouseGuests were informed that their status in the game were at risk. Because Big Brother sent the HouseGuests "invitations" to enter the House instead of a key, the HouseGuests had to earn their status in the first Head of Household competition as there were only eleven keys to be earned. Therefore, for the first time in Big Brother history, one HouseGuest would be evicted by the end of the first night. That night, Janelle and Britney forged an alliance after Dan and Boogie agreed to working together.

Before the HouseGuests competed in their first Head of Household competition, the coaches assigned their teammates. The coaches chose one by one and in order, Britney chose Shane, Willie, and JoJo; Mike chose Frank, Ian, and Jenn; Janelle chose Wil, Ashley, and Joe; and Dan chose Kara, Danielle, and Jodi. The HouseGuests other than the coaches competed in the first Head of Household competition. Each teammate had to jump across large moving mattresses to retrieve life-sized teddy bears (Upon the competition's completion, one of the HouseGuests, Frank, kept his teddy bear; calling him "Teddy B"). After twenty minutes, teams were allowed to substitute one teammate. Team Britney won the Head of Household competition, and Team Dan came in last place, giving Dan the responsibility to evict one of his players. On Day 1, Dan cast the sole vote to evict Jodi. Team Britney then decided that Willie should be the first Head of Household. Mike won the first coaches competition of the season called "Big Brother Derby" and won the power to grant one of his teammates immunity for the week: He chose Ian. The four coaches each had to choose one of their teammates to be a Have-Not for the week, with Ashley, Ian, Shane, and Danielle getting picked. Frank and Kara were nominated for eviction on Day 5. On Day 7, Shane won the Power of Veto competition, "Loose Change", which involved HouseGuests running around and trying to find coin props (one dollar coin, quarter and five cent coins). Once they find them they had to throw the coin props from a distance to a machine. Once they threw a total of $1.30 in coin props, they would win the Power of Veto. Shane decided to leave Willie's nominations the same. On Day 13, Kara was evicted in a 5 to 3 vote, leaving Danielle as Dan's only team member left. It was also revealed the winner of the next Coaches Competition would have the option of either saving one of his or her players or trading them with another player.

Following Kara's eviction, Frank won the Head of Household competition, "Big Brother Break-In". The HouseGuests had to determine whether a burglar that entered the house was guilty or not guilty of a certain crime. HouseGuests were eliminated by answering incorrectly. Janelle won the second coaches competition, "Phat Stacks", and chose to give Ashley immunity from the nominations. She also single-handedly chose the four Have-Nots for the week: Willie, Shane, JoJo, and Ian. On Day 14, Willie was expelled from the house, after going on a rampage in which he threw pork rinds at Janelle, swore at the female HouseGuests, and headbutted Joe. Minutes later, JoJo and Shane were nominated for eviction. On Day 15, Shane won the Memory Chip Power of Veto competition, in which HouseGuests had to run around dressed as salsa chips and dive into different pools of salsa and find different menu items names and then they had to bring the names and put them in correct order in their menu as it is on a menu at which they could look at. The HouseGuest that got most of the names in the correct order in the fastest time won the Power of Veto. Shane removed himself from the block, and Frank then nominated Danielle for eviction. When JoJo and Shane were flirting in the have-not room one night, Ian told Danielle about this and thus, Danielle told Janelle's and Boogie's players. On Day 20, JoJo was evicted by a vote of 5 to 1, only receiving the vote of Shane.

Following JoJo's eviction, Shane won the "On Thin Ice" HoH competition. The HouseGuests shot balls into a slotted end of an ice rink that had scores for each slot. Host Julie Chen then revealed to the viewers they could vote on whether or not the mentors should be allowed to enter the game. On Day 21, the HouseGuests went to the Big Brother Gym for their coaches competition "Feel the Burn". Their goal was to do as many exercises of a certain type. The coach who would do the least would be eliminated. When they were eliminated they had the chance to open a locker and possibly win something. Britney chose Ian and Joe as Have-Nots, Mike Boogie won $10,000 that he shared with Ian whom he gave $3,000 and Jenn who received $1,000. Dan had the opportunity to invite five people to a private sushi & cocktail party. He chose Boogie, Britney, Janelle, Shane & Danielle. Janelle won the Coaches Competition and saved Wil. Later that day, Shane nominated Ashley and Joe for eviction. Also on Day 21; Shane, Ashley, Joe, Wil, Danielle, and Frank had been chosen to compete in the Veto Competition. On Day 22, all had competed in The Juggler Veto Competition, where each HouseGuest had to roll back and forth two balls at the same time on two different ramps. If even one of the balls would fall, that person would be out. Shane won the Power of Veto for the third week in a row. On Day 24, Shane used the Power of Veto on Ashley, nominating Frank in her place. Before the live eviction took place on Day 27, Julie Chen announced that America has chosen to give the coaches the opportunity to play the game and stop coaching. If the coaches voted to become players, the eviction would be canceled and everyone would play in the HoH, including Shane. However, if the coaches chose to keep the game the same, the eviction would continue, but one evicted HouseGuest would return the following week. Julie Chen also announced that only one vote was required to reset the entire game. One by one, the coaches were called into the Diary Room whether to hit the "Reset Button" or not. Britney, Dan and Janelle chose to hit the button, while Mike Boogie did not. With the vote of 3–1, the coaches were reverted to HouseGuest status and Joe and Frank were spared eviction.

All hounded HouseGuests then began to participate in the "Walk the Plank" HoH endurance competition, in which the HouseGuests had to hold on to a bar. If they fell from the plank, they would be eliminated. After a nearly four-hour battle, Danielle became the new HoH, outlasting Britney and Ian. On Day 28, Danielle nominated Frank and Wil for eviction. Danielle won the Power of Veto from the "Field of Veto" competition on Day 29. Later, Boogie made a huge pitch to Danielle by using the veto and backdoor his long-time rival Janelle. A few hours later, all 4 coaches came up to the HOH room and Boogie called out Janelle on her lies. So Dan made an offer to her, if Frank gets vetoed, then Joe goes up. But when Janelle refused to answer, Dan knew that the possibility of all 4 coaches working together has blown up and he has no choice but to accept Boogie's offer on backdooring Janelle. On Day 30, Britney, Dan, Danielle, Frank, Mike Boogie and Shane created the "Silent Six" alliance and conspired to backdoor Janelle. On Day 31, Danielle went through with the plan and used the Power of Veto on Wil and put up Janelle as a replacement nominee. On Day 34, Janelle was evicted by an 8 to 1 vote with Joe as her only vote and became the first returning HouseGuest to leave the show and also marking the first time Janelle has not reached the final three.

Following Janelle's eviction, on Day 34, all HouseGuests, with the exception of Danielle as the outgoing HoH, competed in the "Big Brother Battle of the Bands" HoH competition, in which Frank became the new Head of Household for the second time this season. On Day 35, all HouseGuests competed in the Have/Have Not competition E-Squeeze Me?, except for Ashley who was having back spasms and could not compete. Frank played in her spot. Britney, Danielle, Joe and Shane became the Have Nots for the week, making this week the first week Ian is a Have. On Day 35, Frank nominated Joe and Wil for eviction. The next night, the HouseGuests competed in the Power of Veto competition, Birth of Zingbot, which Frank won. Before the Veto meeting, Wil and Ashley came to Frank and made a pitch on backdooring Dan. But when Boogie heard about this from Frank, he said to Frank, "If you put up Dan, then it's 8 versus 2 and it's game over for us." So at the veto meeting, Frank then decided to keep his nominations the same. On Day 41, Wil was evicted by a 6 to 2 vote.

Following Wil's eviction, on Day 41, the HouseGuests competed in the "Swamped" Head of Household Competition. The first HouseGuest to fill up the HoH jug with liquid and release the cork would win. There were two other jugs as well. One was safety and the other was a choice between $10,000 or a Have Not Pass decided by the viewers voting for $10,000. Britney won safety, Mike Boogie won $10,000, and Shane won his second HoH competition and became the new Head of Household. After the HOH competition, Boogie told Ian his targets would be Britney and Shane for the future. But Ian went on to warn them about Boogie and Frank and they cannot be trusted anymore. On Day 42, Shane went against his "Silent Six" alliance in favor of his second alliance (The Quack Pack) by nominating Frank and Mike Boogie for eviction. After the nomination ceremony, Boogie and Frank were lashing at Dan believing he was the mastermind behind their nominations. But unbeknownst to them, their ally Ian was the "wolf in sheep's clothing." Frank then won his second straight Power of Veto in the controversial Veto competition, The Candy Counter. Frank then used the Veto to save himself from nominations and Shane chose to nominate Jenn as the replacement. On Day 48, it was revealed to the HouseGuests that it was a Double Eviction night. For the first of the two evictions, Mike Boogie was evicted by a vote of 5–2. During the double eviction, Ian won the "Before or After" HoH and immediately nominated Ashley and Frank for eviction. Frank then won his third straight Power of Veto of the season in "Somewhere Over the Veto" and took himself off the block. Ian named Joe as the replacement nominee. At the end of the second eviction, Ashley was evicted by a vote of 5–1 and became the first member of the jury.

Following Boogie and Ashley's eviction, Frank became the new Head of Household and got to choose one HouseGuest to become the Have Not for the week. Frank decided to choose Dan. On Day 49, Frank was given an option to open Pandora's Box. Frank decided to open Pandora's Box and received a little over $3,000, but unleashed quarters in the backyard to play the skill crane game, containing a Golden Ball of Veto. Ian got the ball and won the veto, but in doing so he sacrificed his chance to play in the week's POV competition. Later that day, Frank chose to nominate Dan and Danielle for eviction. On Day 50, the HouseGuests (with the exception of host Ian, who had to sit out since he already had the Golden Ball of Veto, and Joe, who wasn't chosen) played in the Power of Veto competition Draw Something. Jenn won her first competition of the season after Frank was disqualified from the competition for whispering an answer to Britney during her turn.

Dan—who received a punishment of solitary confinement during the competition—used the time to conceive a plan to save himself and Danielle from eviction. After exiting confinement on Day 51, Dan convened a mock "funeral" to thank the other HouseGuests for his time in the competition, including praising Shane as "walking, living proof that there actually is a Captain America", Ian for having "singlehandedly made this experience for me", and offering to meet one-on-one with Frank to apologize for things he had said about him in the past. However, he concluded the "funeral" by staging a mock betrayal of Danielle, declaring that "you know what you did, and in this game, you are dead to me." With the HouseGuests' attention and sympathy deflected towards Danielle, Dan met with Frank as promised, and proposed an alliance that would expose the Quack Pack and Ian's involvement in the eviction of Mike Boogie. After negotiating with Danielle and Jenn, a plan was conceived to use her Power of Veto to replace Dan with Britney for her affiliation with Ian. On Day 52, Ian decided not to use his veto, while Jenn went through with the plan and Britney was shockingly put up as the replacement nominee, completely blindsiding Ian and Britney. Later, Ian and Frank had a huge fight over him betraying Mike "Boogie" and also putting Frank up on the block with Ashley in exchange for Frank giving Ian $3,000 during the Coaches' Competition in week 3. On Day 55, Britney was evicted by a vote of 4–1, only receiving the vote of Ian and became the second member of the jury.

Following Britney's eviction on Day 55, the HouseGuests competed in an endurance HoH competition called "Soak Up the Sun". In the competition, players had to hold onto a rope as it moved around a sun on the ground. With 51% of the public Twitter poll cast during the live show, America voted the first HouseGuest to drop out to have a punishment over a reward. Joe, for being the first to drop, was given a hula hoop and was required to use it every time Big Brother sounded Reveille. It was revealed that 5 hours before the previous live show began, Ian tells Dan he wants to reunite the Quack Pack and to tell him that he's not mad at Dan for what he did this week, but his main concern is that Dan will try to work with Frank and Jenn along with Danielle. So after Ian talked to Dan, Dan told Shane about Ian's idea of reuniting the Quack Pack and he wants go all the way to final four with him, Ian and Danielle. Ian outlasted all the HouseGuests and won HoH less than two hours later. On Day 56, Pandora's Box was presented again and Ian opted to open it, releasing small presents (along with a new hammock for the backyard). Ian also received $1,000 in prize money. However, Big Brother 10 and 11's Jessie Godderz was also released into the house, replacing all of their junk food and snacks with healthy, organic food for the week. On Day 56, Ian nominated Frank and Jenn for eviction. On Day 57, Dan won the Power of Veto competition which featured the return of OTEV. On Day 59, Dan decided to return the favor to Jenn (who vetoed him last week) and used the Veto on her. Ian nominated Joe in her place. On Day 62, it was revealed to the HouseGuests that it was another double eviction night. For the first of two evictions, Frank was evicted by a vote of 3–1 and became the third member of the jury, with Jenn being the only voter to evict Joe. Immediately afterwards, Dan won the "Make Your Case" Head of Household competition after a tiebreaker question with Jenn and Danielle. A few minutes later, Dan nominated both Ian and Joe for eviction with Ian as Dan's main target. Ian then won the "Swimming with Sharks" Power of Veto competition and removed himself from the block. Dan named Danielle as the replacement nominee. At the end of the second double eviction, Joe was evicted by a vote of 3–0 and became the fourth member of the jury.

Following Frank and Joe's eviction, Ian won the "Memory Lane" Head of Household competition, making this his third HoH win and tying him with Frank for the most HoH wins so far this season. On Day 63, Ian opened Pandora's Box thereby giving the other HouseGuests video messages from home while he talked to Rachel Reilly from Big Brother 12 and 13. Later that day, Ian nominated Jenn and Shane for eviction. On Day 64, Shane won the Power of Veto and a prize. On Day 65, Shane and Danielle went on a luxury prize to the Kellogg's Tour of Gymnastic Champions. On Day 66, Shane decided to use the Power of Veto to save himself from the block, and in return, Ian nominated Danielle as the replacement. On Day 68, Jenn was evicted by a vote of 2–0 and became the fifth member of the jury. On Day 68, Danielle won her second HoH competition of the season "Photographic Memory", and went on to nominate Dan and Ian for eviction. On Day 68, Danielle won the "Atomic Veto" competition, making it her second and final Veto of the season. After the veto competition, Dan asked Danielle to use the Veto on himself, to which Danielle would only agree if Dan would evict Ian and not Shane. On Day 69, Danielle used the Power of Veto on Dan, and was replaced by Shane. A few minutes later, the biggest blindside of the summer occurred as Dan chose to evict Shane, blindsiding Danielle and Shane. Shane became the sixth member of the jury.

Following Shane's eviction, Dan won the first part of the final Head of Household competition, "Hook, Line, and Sinker" (similar to the "King of The Jungle" endurance HOH from season 10 in which Dan also won). On Day 71, Ian won the second part of the final Head of Household competition, "Climb Time". On Day 75, Ian won the third part of the final Head of Household, "Jury Statements" and became the final Head of Household of the season. Ian then evicted Danielle and chose Dan to take to the final two. The jury was allowed to ask questions to both Dan and Ian, who began to turn against each other. In the end, the jury voted for Ian to win the grand prize by a vote of 6 to 1, with Danielle being the only person to vote for Dan. Before the finale ended, Julie Chen announced that Frank was the winner of the $25,000 America's Favorite HouseGuest prize. Ian Terry now has a record of 4 HOH wins, tying Rachel Reilly from Big Brother 13, Hayden Moss from Big Brother 12, Janelle Pierzina from Big Brother 7 and Drew Daniel from Big Brother 5.

== Episodes ==
No. overall	No. in season	Title	Original release date
440	1	"Episode 1"	July 12, 2012
441	2	"Episode 2"	July 15, 2012
442	3	"Episode 3"	July 18, 2012
443	4	"Episode 4"	July 19, 2012
444	5	"Episode 5"	July 22, 2012
445	6	"Episode 6"	July 25, 2012
446	7	"Episode 7"	July 26, 2012
447	8	"Episode 8"	July 29, 2012
448	9	"Episode 9"	August 1, 2012
449	10	"Episode 10"	August 2, 2012
450	11	"Episode 11"	August 5, 2012
451	12	"Episode 12"	August 8, 2012
452	13	"Episode 13"	August 9, 2012
453	14	"Episode 14"	August 12, 2012
454	15	"Episode 15"	August 15, 2012
455	16	"Episode 16"	August 16, 2012
456	17	"Episode 17"	August 19, 2012
457	18	"Episode 18"	August 22, 2012
458	19	"Episode 19"	August 23, 2012
459	20	"Episode 20"	August 26, 2012
460	21	"Episode 21"	August 29, 2012
461	22	"Episode 22"	August 30, 2012
462	23	"Episode 23"	September 2, 2012
463	24	"Episode 24"	September 5, 2012
464	25	"Episode 25"	September 6, 2012
465	26	"Episode 26"	September 9, 2012
466	27	"Episode 27"	September 12, 2012
467	28	"Episode 28"	September 13, 2012
468	29	"Episode 29"	September 16, 2012
469	30	"Episode 30"	September 19, 2012

== Voting history ==
Color key:

Winner
Runner-up
Head of Household
Nominated for eviction
Immune from eviction
Evicted
Expelled by production

Voting history (season 14)
	Week 1		Week 2	Week 3	Week 4	Week 5	Week 6		Week 7	Week 8		Week 9		Week 10	
	Day 1	Day 5	Week 2	Week 3	Week 4	Week 5	Day 42	Day 48 (Note: This week was a double eviction week. Following the first eviction, the remaining HouseGuests played a week's worth of games, including Head of Household and veto competitions, and nomination, veto and eviction ceremonies, during the live show, culminating in a second eviction for the week.)	Week 7	Day 56	Day 62	Day 63	Day 68	Day 75	Finale
Head of Household	(None)	Willie	Frank	Shane	Danielle	Frank	Shane	Ian	Frank	Ian	Dan	Ian	Danielle	Ian	(None)
Coaches competition	(None)	Boogie	Janelle	Janelle	(None)									(None)	(None)
Coach's decision	(None)	Ian	Ashley	Wil	(None)									(None)	(None)
Nominations (initial)	(None)	Frank; Kara	JoJo; Shane	Ashley; Joe	Frank; Wil	Joe; Wil	Boogie; Frank	Ashley; Frank	Dan; Danielle	Frank; Jenn	Ian; Joe	Jenn; Shane	Dan; Ian	(None)	(None)
Veto winner(s)	(None)	Shane	Shane	Shane	Danielle	Frank	Frank	Frank	Ian; Jenn	Dan	Ian	Shane	Danielle	(None)	(None)
Nominations (final)	Danielle; Jodi; Kara	Frank; Kara	Danielle; JoJo	Frank; Joe	Frank; Janelle	Joe; Wil	Boogie; Jenn	Ashley; Joe	Britney; Danielle	Frank; Joe	Danielle; Joe	Danielle; Jenn	Ian; Shane	Dan; Danielle	(None)
Ian	No vote	Kara (Note: This player was granted immunity by their coach after their coach won a challenge.)	JoJo	No vote	Janelle	Wil	Boogie	Head of Household	Danielle	Head of Household	Joe	Head of Household	Nominated	Danielle (Note: As Head of Household, Ian chose to evict Danielle.)	Winner
Dan	Jodi (Note: As the coach of the losing team, Dan had to evict one member of his team on day 1; he chose to evict Jodi.)	Coach		Accepted offer (Note: The audience voted to offer the coaches an opportunity to enter the game as HouseGuests. Before the planned eviction on day 27, the coaches were individually presented with a reset button. If the button were pressed by at least one coach, the eviction would be cancelled and the game would reset with the coaches becoming full HouseGuests, and Shane would still be eligible to compete in the next Head of Household competition. Three of the coaches pressed the button and the game was reset.)	Janelle	Wil	Boogie	Ashley	Britney	Frank	Head of Household	Jenn	Shane	Nominated	Runner-up
Danielle	Nominated	Frank	Nominated	No vote	Head of Household	Wil	Boogie	Ashley	Nominated	Frank	Nominated	Nominated	Head of Household	Evicted (Day 75)	Dan
Shane	No vote	Frank	Danielle	Head of Household	Janelle	Wil	Head of Household	Ashley	Britney	Frank	Joe	Jenn	Nominated	Evicted (Day 69)	Ian
Jenn	No vote	Kara	JoJo	No vote	Janelle	Joe	Nominated	Ashley	Britney	Joe	Joe	Nominated	Evicted (Day 67)		Ian
Joe	No vote	Kara	JoJo	Nominated	Frank	Nominated	Boogie	Nominated	Britney	Nominated	Nominated	Evicted (Day 62)			Ian
Frank	No vote	Nominated	Head of Household	Nominated	Nominated	Head of Household	Jenn	Joe	Head of Household	Nominated	Evicted (Day 62)				Ian
Britney	No vote	Coach		Accepted offer	Janelle	Wil	Boogie (Note: Britney won immunity in a challenge.)	Ashley	Nominated	Evicted (Day 55)					Ian
Ashley	No vote	Kara	JoJo	No vote	Janelle	Joe	Jenn	Nominated	Evicted (Day 48)						Ian
Boogie	No vote	Coach		Declined offer	Janelle	Wil	Nominated	Evicted (Day 48)							
Wil	No vote	Kara	JoJo	No vote	Janelle	Nominated	Evicted (Day 41)								
Janelle	No vote	Coach		Accepted offer	Nominated	Evicted (Day 34)									
JoJo	No vote	Frank	Nominated	Evicted (Day 20)											
Willie	No vote	Head of Household	Expelled (Day 14)												
Kara	Nominated	Nominated	Evicted (Day 13)												
Jodi	Nominated	Evicted (Day 1)													
Evicted	Jodi; Dan's choice to evict	Kara; 5 of 8 votes to evict	JoJo; 5 of 6 votes to evict	Eviction cancelled	Janelle; 8 of 9 votes to evict	Wil; 6 of 8 votes to evict	Boogie; 5 of 7 votes to evict	Ashley; 5 of 6 votes to evict	Britney; 4 of 5 votes to evict	Frank; 3 of 4 votes to evict	Joe; 3 of 3 votes to evict	Jenn; 2 of 2 votes to evict	Shane; Dan's choice to evict	Danielle; Ian's choice to evict	Ian; 6 votes to win
Evicted	Jodi; Dan's choice to evict	Kara; 5 of 8 votes to evict	JoJo; 5 of 6 votes to evict	Eviction cancelled	Janelle; 8 of 9 votes to evict	Wil; 6 of 8 votes to evict	Boogie; 5 of 7 votes to evict	Ashley; 5 of 6 votes to evict	Britney; 4 of 5 votes to evict	Frank; 3 of 4 votes to evict	Joe; 3 of 3 votes to evict	Jenn; 2 of 2 votes to evict	Shane; Dan's choice to evict	Danielle; Ian's choice to evict	Dan; 1 vote to win

== Production ==
Big Brother 14 was produced by Endemol USA and Fly on the Wall Entertainment with Allison Grodner and Rich Meehan returning as executive producers. This season was announced on the same day as the finale of Big Brother 13 in a press release issued from CBS. Casting for Big Brother 14 began during the finale of Big Brother 13. This is the first season to use an online application process and to have a dedicated casting website like Big Brother UK. Applicants are required to make a three-minute video then use a form to submit it to the producers with a current picture. Applications and video submissions were due on May 11, 2012. Applicants chosen to be a finalist went to Los Angeles, where they were narrowed down to a pool of 40 finalists. Open casting calls were held by the producers where they visited New Orleans, Los Angeles, New York City, Charleston, Odessa, Dallas, Miami, Cincinnati, Boise, Chicago, Atlanta, Denver, Louisville, Boston, Champaign and Phoenix. On June 4, 2012, Robyn Kass, casting director for Big Brother, revealed on her Twitter that all semi-finalists were contacted.

The first television advertisements hinting this season's twist first aired June 17, 2012, on CBS. This season is being slated to promote a "super sized" season, indicating the most HouseGuests entering to date and four huge surprises to be revealed on the premiere, being the four ex-HouseGuests competing as mentors. By July 2, 2012, several media outlets such as CBS.com and Yahoo! TV officially released house photos. The season's main House theme is the 80s and "Tokyo Pop". The overall layout of the house remained the same as to recent previous seasons, in addition to various refurbishments to the appliances and a new paint job in the backyard. The room containing Pandora's Box had been replaced this season with a dual-HoH bedroom that was shared with the winning HoH's coach up until the feature was disabled when the coaches entered the game as regular players. The HouseGuests moved into the House on July 7, 2012.

== Reception ==
=== Viewing figures ===
Key
†	Season high for that night of the week

#	Air Date	United States					Source
#	Air Date	Households (rating/share)	18–49 (rating/share)	Viewers (millions)	Rank (timeslot)	Rank (night)	Source
1	Thursday, July 12	4.4/8	2.6/8	7.18 †	1	1	
2	Sunday, July 15	3.7/7	2.3/7	6.21	1	1	
3	Wednesday, July 18	3.5/6	2.0/7	5.78	1	1 (Tie)	
4	Thursday, July 19	3.8/6	2.2/7	6.27	1	2	
5	Sunday, July 22	3.3/6	2.0/6	5.37	2	4	
6	Wednesday, July 25	3.6/6	2.0/7	5.77	1	2	
7	Thursday, July 26	3.7/6	2.2/7	6.00	2	3	
8	Sunday, July 29	3.1/5	1.9/5	5.11	2	3	
9	Wednesday, August 1	3.4/6	2.0/6	5.40	2	2	
10	Thursday, August 2	3.3/5	2.0/5	5.46	2	3	
11	Sunday, August 5	3.5/6	2.1/6	5.72	2	3	
12	Wednesday, August 8	3.4/6	1.9/6	5.39	2	2	
13	Thursday, August 9	4.0/6	1.8/5	5.03	2	3	
14	Sunday, August 12	3.5/6	2.0/6	5.36	2	3	
15	Wednesday, August 15	3.7/7	2.1/7	5.96	1	2	
16	Thursday, August 16	4.0/7	2.2/7	6.13	1	3	
17	Sunday, August 19	3.9/7	2.4/7	6.57	2	3	
18	Wednesday, August 22	3.7/6	2.1/7	5.86	1	2	
19	Thursday, August 23	4.0/7	2.3/7	6.28	1	1	
20	Sunday, August 26	4.5/7	2.6/8	7.37 †	2	2	
21	Wednesday, August 29	4.3/7	2.3/7	6.40	1	2	
22	Thursday, August 30	4.3/7	1.9/6	5.45	1	1	
23	Sunday, September 2	N/A	1.9/7	5.65	1	1	
24	Wednesday, September 5	3.8/6	2.1/6	6.09	1	2	
25	Thursday, September 6	3.8/6	2.3/6	6.20	1	2	
26^{1}	Sunday, September 9	3.2/5	2.3/6	6.90	1	3	
27	Wednesday, September 12	3.8/6	2.1/6	6.19	3	4	
28	Thursday, September 13	3.6/6	2.0/5	5.75	2	6	
29	Sunday, September 16	3.9/6	2.4/6	7.24	2	5	
30	Wednesday, September 19	4.3/7	2.5/7	7.39 †	1	3	

- ^Note 1: Due to sports overruns, episode 26 was delayed by a half-hour.

=== Critical response ===
Willie was expelled from the Big Brother house on Day 14 after head-butting Joe, who had made comments in retaliation to comments made by Willie. Moments before the incident with Joe, Willie told everyone that he would do anything to get himself removed before the actual live eviction that week. Willie proceeded to throw food at Janelle and call other female HouseGuests explicit names, before ending his rampage with the headbutt incident. He was immediately called into the Diary Room and expelled from the game. Minutes later, the remaining HouseGuests were informed by producer Allison Grodner that Willie had been permanently removed from the game.

On Day 49, after winning the Golden Ball of Veto from the crane game, Ian alleged several times to various HouseGuests that some of the producers were attempting to manipulate his decision by supposedly telling Ian how the Ball of Veto would benefit him if he decided to use it. Although that did cause fans to question the Big Brother game, other HouseGuests from past seasons have stated that the producers always ask the HouseGuests to name pros and cons about evicting certain HouseGuests for the week and they also ask the HouseGuests how it would better their own game if they kept one HouseGuest over another, and vice versa.
