= Big Brother 10 (American season) =

Big Brother
- Season 10
- Big Brother 10 logo
- Hosted by: Julie Chen
- No. of days: 71
- No. of houseguests: 13
- Winner: Dan Gheesling
- Runner-up: Robert "Memphis" Garrett
- America's Favorite Juror: Keesha Smith
- Companion shows: House Calls; Big Brother: After Dark
- No. of episodes: 29

Release
- Original network: CBS
- Original release: July 13 – September 16, 2008

Additional information
- Filming dates: July 8 – September 16, 2008

Season chronology
- ← Previous; Season 9 Next → Season 11

Big Brother 10 is the tenth season of the American reality television series Big Brother. It is based upon the Dutch series of the same name, which gained notoriety in 1999 and 2000. The season premiered on CBS on July 13, 2008, and lasted ten weeks until the live finale on September 16, 2008. The tenth season saw a slight increase in ratings compared to the past seasons of the series, which had the lowest ratings. The season premiered to a total of 6.29 million viewers, the lowest premiere numbers for any season. The season finale had a total of 7.63 million viewers, the third lowest rated finale. The series averaged 6.72 million viewers, making it the second lowest rated season of the series. Big Brother 10 featured a total of 13 HouseGuests, the first time there had been a decrease in HouseGuests.

== Format ==
The format remained largely unchanged from previous seasons. HouseGuests were sequestered in the Big Brother House with no contact to and from the outside world. Each week, the HouseGuests took part in several compulsory challenges that determined who would win food, luxuries and power in the House. The winner of the Head of Household competition was immune from nominations and was instructed to nominate two fellow HouseGuests for eviction. After a HouseGuest became Head of Household they were ineligible to take part in the next Head of Household competition. The winner of the Power of Veto competition won the right to save one of the nominated HouseGuests from eviction. If the Veto winner exercised the power, the Head of Household then had to nominate another HouseGuest for eviction.

On eviction night all HouseGuests except for the Head of Household and the two nominees voted to evict one of the two nominees. Before the voting began the nominees had the chance to say a final message to their fellow HouseGuests. This compulsory vote was conducted in the privacy of the Diary Room by the host Julie Chen. In the event of a tie, the Head of Household would break the tie and reveal their vote in front of the other HouseGuests. Unlike other versions of Big Brother, the HouseGuests could discuss the nomination and eviction process open and freely. The nominee with the most votes from the other HouseGuests was evicted from the House on Thursday and interviewed by Julie Chen. HouseGuests could voluntarily leave the House at any time and those who broke the rules were expelled by Big Brother. The last seven evictees of the season form the Jury that voted for the winner on the season finale, they were known as the jury members. The jury members were sequestered in a separate house and was not allowed to watch the show except for segments that included all of the HouseGuests. The jury members were not shown any Diary Room interviews or any footage that included strategy or details regarding nominations.

== HouseGuests ==
The cast of the tenth season of Big Brother. Top: Libra, Brian, Michelle, Jerry, Dan, Angie, Steven, and Renny Bottom: Jessie, April, Ollie, Keesha, and Memphis

Name	Age	Occupation	Residence	Result
Dan Gheesling	24	Catholic school teacher	Dearborn, Michigan	Winner; Day 71
Robert "Memphis" Garrett	25	Mixologist	Los Angeles, California	Runner-up; Day 71
Jerry MacDonald	75	Retired marketing executive	Magnolia, Texas	Evicted; Day 66
Keesha Smith	29	Waitress	Burbank, California	Evicted; Day 64
Lorenza "Renny" Martyn	53	Beauty salon owner	New Orleans, Louisiana	Evicted; Day 59
Bryan Ollie	27	Marketing sales representative	Bloomington, Minnesota	Evicted; Day 52
Michelle Costa	28	Real estate broker	Cumberland, Rhode Island	Evicted; Day 52
April Dowling	30	Financial manager	Higley, Arizona	Evicted; Day 45
Libra Thompson	31	Human resources representative	Spring, Texas	Evicted; Day 38
Jessie Godderz	22	Professional bodybuilder	Rudd, Iowa	Evicted; Day 31
Angie Swindell	29	Pharmaceutical sales representative	Orlando, Florida	Evicted; Day 24
Steven Daigle	35	Rodeo competitor	The Woodlands, Texas	Evicted; Day 16
Brian Hart	27	Telecommunication manager	San Francisco, California	Evicted; Day 9

=== Future appearances ===
Jessie Godderz returned to compete on Big Brother 11 the following year, then made appearances in the twelfth, thirteenth, fourteenth, seventeenth, eighteenth, nineteenth, twentieth, twenty-seventh, and twenty-eighth seasons as a guest, as well as on Celebrity Big Brother. Brian Hart was also a candidate to return for Big Brother 11, though he ultimately did not enter the game. Dan Gheesling also returned to Big Brother 11 to host a luxury competition, then later returned to Big Brother 14 in 2012 as a coach to the new HouseGuests. In 2020, Memphis and Keesha returned to compete again on Big Brother 22.

In 2024, Dan Gheesling competed on the second season of the Peacock reality TV competition series The Traitors. Later that year, Jessie Godderz competed on E! Network reality TV competition series House of Villains.

== Summary ==
On Day 1, the thirteen HouseGuests met for the first time outside of the house. Before being able to speak to one another, they were required to cast their vote for the HouseGuest they would most like to see become Head of Household. Without the results being revealed, the HouseGuests entered the house. That night, they competed in the "Buggin' Out" food competition. For this competition, HouseGuests split into teams and got into separate replica cars suspended on a zip-line. The teams were required to travel from one end of the backyard to the other, dropping off one HouseGuest each time they did so; the last HouseGuest remaining in the replica would win a new car and earn their team food for the week. Memphis was the winner of the car while the losing team of April, Brian, Jerry, Keesha, Libra, and Ollie was placed on the slop diet for the week. Upon returning inside, the HouseGuests learned that Jerry had been crowned the first Head of Household of the season. Shortly following this, Brian, Dan, and Ollie formed an alliance with the goal of making it to the end together. That night, Jessie and Renny engaged in an argument when he alleged that she was being loud, thus preventing him from sleeping. The following day, Brian formed an alliance with Jerry and attempted to get him to nominate Jessie and Renny for eviction due to their conflict. On Day 2, Jerry nominated Jessie and Renny for eviction, citing their early conflict as the main reason. When picking player for the Power of Veto competition, April, Memphis, and Michelle were selected to compete; Angie was selected to host. On Day 5, HouseGuests competed in the "Sweet Dreams, Honey" Power of Veto competition. For this competition, HouseGuests crawled through honey and dug through pillows in an attempt to find five stuffed bears; the first HouseGuest to do so would be the winner. Jessie was the winner of the Power of Veto. Following this, April, Keesha, and Libra became suspicious of Brian, feeling that he was making too many alliances. When they confronted Ollie about his friendship with Brian and Dan, Ollie told the girls about his alliance with them. The girls and Ollie then began to rally the house against Brian, with Angie, April, Jessie, Keesha, Libra, Memphis, Michelle, and Ollie forming an alliance before holding a meeting with Jerry to convince him to nominate Brian. On Day 6, Jessie used the Power of Veto to remove himself from the block, with Jerry nominating Brian in his place. On Day 9, Brian became the first HouseGuest to be evicted from the house in a vote of nine to one.

Following Brian's eviction, HouseGuests competed in the "Majority Rules" Head of Household competition. For this competition, the HouseGuests were asked a series of questions about which of two HouseGuests the majority would pick under certain circumstances. The object was to base the answer on how they thought the majority would answer. The minority of the voters got eliminated each round; if there was a tie, none of the HouseGuests were eliminated. Jessie was the winner. Jessie expressed interest in nominating Renny that week; however, the other members of the eight-person alliance pressured him to nominate Dan and Steven due to their close friendship with Brian. On Day 10, HouseGuests competed in the "Stop Your Wining!" food competition. For this competition, HouseGuests split into two teams and filled wine bottles from wine that was pouring out from barrels suspended in the air; the team with the most wine in their bottles at the end would win. The team of April, Jerry, Keesha, Libra, Memphis, and Renny lost, thus being placed on the slop diet for the week. Later that day, Jessie nominated Dan and Steven for eviction, with Steven being his main target. Realizing that the alliance of eight would soon fall apart, Angie, Jessie, Memphis, and Michelle formed an alliance outside of the group. The other members of the alliance of eight began to fear that Keesha would use the Power of Veto to save Steven due to their friendship; Keesha told Steven that she would use the Power of Veto to remove him from the block. On Day 11, HouseGuests competed in the "License to Veto" Power of Veto competition. For this competition, HouseGuests were shown various license plates with portions of a phrase on them and had to determine which three plates made up a specific Big Brother phrase. If a HouseGuest answered incorrectly, they were eliminated; the last remaining HouseGuest would be the winner. Michelle was the winner of the Power of Veto. Following this, Steven attempted to convince Jessie and Michelle to use the Power of Veto and backdoor Libra that week, a plan to which they initially were receptive. On Day 13, however, Michelle chose not to use the Power of Veto. On Day 16, Steven became the second HouseGuest to be evicted from the house in a vote of nine to zero.

Following Steven's eviction, HouseGuests competed in the "Alien Abduction" Head of Household competition. For this competition, HouseGuests were asked questions about objects that had been "abducted" from the house. They faced off two at a time, with the winner of each round selecting the next two to face off; the last HouseGuest remaining was the winner. Keesha was the winner. Soon after winning, Keesha decided she would be going against the alliance of eight, with the goal of avenging Steven's eviction. Her alliance of April, Libra, and Ollie was supportive of her decision, and the four decided to target Angie that week. On Day 17, HouseGuests competed in the "BB Valley High Sock Hop" food competition. For this competition, HouseGuests split into couples and had to communicate with each other from opposite sides of a wall in an attempt to find matching socks. When the couple found a match, they could place it anywhere on the board, though the location they placed them in determined what food they earned for the week. Later that day, Keesha chose to nominate Angie and Jessie for eviction, with Angie being her main target. When picking players for the Power of Veto competition, Libra, Memphis, and Ollie were selected to compete; Dan was selected to host. On Day 18, HouseGuests competed in "The Garden of Veto" Power of Veto competition. For this competition, HouseGuests dressed as flowers and led in a bed of soil with water being poured on them. The HouseGuest to remain in their bed for the time closest to an hour without going over would be the winner. Keesha was the winner of the Power of Veto after everyone else stayed in for over an hour. Following this, Jessie attempted on numerous occasions to convince Keesha to use the Power of Veto and nominate Libra, as he felt the other HouseGuests would evict her. On Day 20, Keesha chose not to use the Power of Veto. Following a vote from the viewers, Dan was given the title of America's Player for the upcoming week. On Day 24, Angie became the third HouseGuest to be evicted from the house in a vote of eight to zero.

Following Angie's eviction, HouseGuests competed in the "Livin' On the Edge" endurance Head of Household competition. For this competition, HouseGuests stood on the side of a building wall that was slanted towards the ground. The HouseGuests had only a bar to hold onto, and the last HouseGuest remaining would be the winner. April was the winner. During the competition, April convinced Michelle to drop out of the competition when she promised both Michelle and Jessie safety for that week. Due to the endurance competition, there was no food competition for this week. On Day 25, April chose to nominate Jessie and Memphis for eviction. When picking players for the Power of Veto competition, Michelle, Libra, and Jerry were selected to compete; Renny was selected to host. On Day 26, HouseGuests competed in the "Slap Shot" Power of Veto competition. For this competition, HouseGuests attempted to hit a hockey puck into a goal, and the HouseGuest furthest away from the center each round was eliminated. The eliminated HouseGuests could claim a prize; however, a prize could be stolen from them by any person eliminated after them. Libra was the winner of the competition but chose to take the Hawaiian vacation from Michelle, leaving her to wear a red leotard. Jerry then won the Power of Veto. On Day 28, Jerry chose not to use the Power of Veto. Following this, April insisted that her alliance keep Jessie in the house in an attempt to honor her word to Michelle. Due to Jessie's various arguments with the other HouseGuests, Keesha and Libra began plotting to evict him, thus dividing the HouseGuests into two groups. Keesha, Libra, and Renny wanted to keep Memphis, while Jerry, Michelle, and Ollie wanted to keep Jessie in the game. It became apparent that Dan would have the deciding vote, causing both sides to attempt to sway him; as America's Player, Dan was required to vote however the viewers chose. On Day 31, Jessie became the fourth HouseGuest to be evicted from the house in a vote of four to three.

Following Jessie's eviction, HouseGuests competed in the "Rude Awakening" Head of Household competition. For this competition, HouseGuests were asked true or false questions about fan-submitted messages they had heard the previous night; an incorrect answer resulted in elimination, and the last HouseGuest remaining was the winner. Michelle was the winner. Following these events, an argument between all of the HouseGuests (except for Dan) erupted, with April, Jerry, and Michelle attacking Dan's religious beliefs. Though April and Michelle ended the conflict, Jerry insulted Dan's religious and personal beliefs for weeks afterwards. On Day 32, HouseGuests competed in the "In the News" food competition. For this competition, previously evicted HouseGuest Brian returned as host, while one representative from each previous BB season returned to participate. The current HouseGuests would select one of the returning HouseGuests to give them news from the outside world and had to determine if they were being truthful; a correct answer earned the house food for a specific day of the week, while an incorrect answer placed them on the slop diet for that day. Later that day, Michelle nominated Keesha and Libra for eviction, with Libra being her main target. When picking players for the Power of Veto competition, April, Jerry, and Memphis were selected to compete; Ollie was selected to host. On Day 33, HouseGuests competed in the "Cry Me a Veto" Power of Veto competition. For this competition, HouseGuests were required to chop up onions with one of three techniques and were then placed their chopped onions into a box; they could place them into either their Veto box or their prize box. The HouseGuest with the heaviest Veto box at the end of the competition would be the winner of the Power of Veto, while the two HouseGuests with the most weight in their prize box would win prizes. Jerry was the winner of the Power of Veto. Despite Jerry's attempts at convincing Michelle to nominate Dan should he use the Power of Veto, she was reluctant about doing so as she wanted Libra evicted that week. On Day 35, Jerry chose not to use the Power of Veto on either nominee. During his speech, Jerry infamously referred to Dan as "Judas" due to his vote the previous week. That night, Dan and Memphis made a deal to get to the end together, thus forming The Renegades alliance. On Day 38, Libra became the fifth HouseGuest to be evicted from the house in a vote of six to zero. She became the first member of the Jury of Seven.

Following Libra's eviction, HouseGuests competed in the "Diary Room Confessionals" Head of Household competition. For this competition, HouseGuests were given quotes made by the first four evicted HouseGuests and were required to be the first to guess who had made the comment; a correct answer allowed that HouseGuest to eliminate someone from the competition, while an incorrect answer resulted in their own elimination. Renny was the winner. On Day 39, HouseGuests competed in the "Big Brother Rock, Paper, Scissors" food competition. For this competition, HouseGuests participated in a game of Rock, Paper, Scissors, with these being replaced with Slop, Pig Ears, and Crickets. The winner of each round would have to eat the food to earn a point for their team; the team with the most points at the end of the competition would earn food for the week. The team of Jerry, Memphis, and Ollie were placed on the slop diet for the week. The viewers chose to reward the HouseGuests on the slop diet with lollipops, which they could eat while on the slop diet. Renny, hoping to evict April that week, debated nominating Dan or Memphis as a pawn against her in an attempt to keep Jerry and Ollie from being mad at her. Her alliance with them and Keesha, however, attempted to talk her out of this plan. Later that day, Renny nominated April and Jerry for eviction. When picking players for the Power of Veto competition, Dan, Keesha, and Ollie were selected; Michelle was selected to host. On Day 40, HouseGuests competed in the "Haunted Yard" Power of Veto competition. For this competition, HouseGuests had to determine the quantity of an object used to make an object. Each round, HouseGuests could either stay or fold; folding would allow them to continue in the game but they could not get a point whereas the HouseGuest with the answer closest to the correct one would earn a point, and the farthest was eliminated. Dan was the winner of the Power of Veto. Dan, upset with Renny's decision to not nominate April and Ollie together, later debated using the Power of Veto to save Jerry. When he spoke with Renny, she would not specify a replacement nominee and expressed displeasure at the thought of Dan using the veto. On Day 42, Dan chose not to use the Power of Veto. On Day 45, April became the sixth HouseGuest to be evicted from the house in a vote of four to one. She became the second member of the Jury of Seven.

Following April's eviction, HouseGuests competed in the "King of the Jungle" endurance Head of Household competition. For this competition, HouseGuests held onto rope swings in the backyard in an attempt to be the last one remaining. Dan was the winner. During the competition, Dan promised both Ollie and Michelle safety and also stated he would allow Ollie to choose one of the nominees as well as the replacement nominee should the Power of Veto be used. Ollie later decided he would like to see Memphis, though Dan was fearful of this due to his Renegades alliance with Memphis. On Day 46, Dan chose to nominate Jerry and Memphis for eviction. Jerry later won a public vote that allowed him to receive a phone call from home. When picking players for the Power of Veto competition, Keesha, Michelle, and Renny were selected to compete; Ollie was selected to host. On Day 47, HouseGuests competed in the "One Giant Leap" Power of Veto competition. For this competition, HouseGuests were required to travel across a zip-line in an attempt to gather puzzle pieces and be the first to complete the puzzle; the HouseGuests competed in heats, with the winners of the first two heats facing off in the final round. Memphis was the winner. Ollie later informed Dan that he would like Keesha to be nominated in the place of Memphis, as part of his deal with Dan stated he could choose the replacement nominee. On Day 49, Memphis chose to use the Power of Veto to remove himself from the block, with Dan nominating Michelle in his place. Dan's decision led to much controversy inside and outside of the house when Ollie engaged in numerous arguments with the other HouseGuests. On Day 52, Michelle became the seventh HouseGuest to be evicted from the house in a vote of three to one. The HouseGuests learned that it would be a Double Eviction week, and that another HouseGuest would be evicted within the hour. HouseGuests then competed in the "Big Brother Headlines" Head of Household competition. For this competition, HouseGuests were questioned over which HouseGuest the viewers felt would most fit a specific news headline; the HouseGuest with the most points after seven questions would win. Keesha was the winner. Keesha chose to nominate Jerry and Ollie for eviction. HouseGuests then competed in the "Veto In a Haystack" Power of Veto competition. For this competition, HouseGuests dug through barrels of hay in an attempt to find two Veto medallions; the first to complete this would be the winner. Dan was the winner of the Power of Veto; Dan then chose not to use the Power of Veto on either nominee. Minutes later, Ollie became the eighth HouseGuest to be evicted from the house in a unanimous vote of three to zero. He became the fourth member of the Jury of Seven.

Following Michelle and Ollie's eviction, HouseGuests competed in the "Days Go By" Head of Household competition. For this competition, HouseGuests were given an event in the house, and they were required to figure out which day this event occurred; they would roll a skee-ball up a ramp in an attempt to make their ball land on the date that the event occurred. The number of days they were incorrect would earn the HouseGuests a penalty point, and the HouseGuest with the lowest number of penalty points was the winner. Jerry was the winner. In an attempt to keep their Renegades alliance intact, Dan and Memphis agreed that Memphis should make a deal with Jerry to keep himself safe. The two then decided that Memphis needed to win the Power of Veto, allowing them both to be safe and decide who would be evicted. On Day 53, Jerry chose to nominate Dan and Keesha for eviction. On Day 54, HouseGuests competed in the "Rock A Bye Veto" Power of Veto competition. For this competition, HouseGuests had to correctly figure out which two faces of the HouseGuests made up a set of faces. The HouseGuest who finished the competition in the fastest amount of time was the winner. Memphis was the winner of the Power of Veto. On Day 56, Memphis chose to use the Power of Veto to remove Dan from the block, with Renny being the only eligible HouseGuest to be nominated in his place. On Day 59, Renny became the ninth HouseGuest to be evicted from the house in a unanimous vote of two to zero.

Following Renny's eviction, HouseGuests competed in the "Freeze Frame" Head of Household competition. For this competition, HouseGuests were asked questions about images of previous competitions that they had been shown beforehand; the HouseGuest with the most correct answers after seven questions was the winner. Dan was the winner. Upon returning inside, the HouseGuests found a sumo wrestler inside who would sit up and down and random times; the HouseGuests later discovered he was sitting on an envelope, which revealed to the HouseGuests that they would begin a luxury competition that same day. Previously evicted HouseGuest Jessie later returned to host the competition, which required the four to attempt to guess a phrase based on various clues in an attempt to win a trip to a luxury island; Dan was the winner. In the Diary Room he learned he could bring either a current HouseGuest or a Jury Member on his trip with him, and he chose to bring Michelle; he later lied to his fellow HouseGuests and stated he chose to bring nobody with him. Dan and Memphis later decided he should nominate Memphis for eviction in a further attempt to hide their Renegades alliance. On Day 60, Dan chose to nominate Jerry and Memphis for eviction. On Day 61, HouseGuests competed in the "Stairway to Veto" Power of Veto competition. For this competition, each HouseGuest had their own staircase, with two facts on each step. The first HouseGuest to figure out which HouseGuest went with the facts and completely finish their stairway would win the Power of Veto. Memphis was the winner of the final Power of Veto competition. On Day 64, Memphis chose to use the Power of Veto to remove himself from the block, with Keesha being the only eligible HouseGuest to nominate in his place. Minutes later, Keesha became the tenth HouseGuest to be evicted from the house when Memphis cast the sole vote against her.

Following Keesha's eviction, HouseGuests began competing in the "On a Wing and Prayer" Head of Household competition. For this competition, HouseGuests stood atop of model airplanes in an attempt to be the last one remaining. Dan was the winner. On Day 65, Jerry and Memphis competed against one another in the second round of the final Head of Household competition. For this competition, HouseGuests were required to knock over cardboard cutouts of the thirteen HouseGuests, leaving only the Head of Household and final nominees from the week standing; the HouseGuest to finish in the fastest time would be the winner. Memphis was the winner. On Day 66, Dan and Memphis competed against one another in the "Jury Statements" final round of the final Head of Household competition. For this competition, HouseGuests were asked to finish a sentence made by one of the six members of the Jury of Seven. Dan was the winner, thus became the final Head of Household of the season. Dan then cast the sole vote to evict Jerry from the house, making the Renegade alliance the Final Two. On Day 71, Dan was crowned the winner of Big Brother 10 in a Jury vote of seven to zero.

== Episodes ==
No. overall	No. in season	Title	Original release date	U.S. viewers (millions)
322	1	"Episode 1"	July 13, 2008	6.13
323	2	"Episode 2"	July 15, 2008	6.10
324	3	"Episode 3"	July 16, 2008	5.76
325	4	"Episode 4"	July 20, 2008	5.72
326	5	"Episode 5"	July 22, 2008	6.07
327	6	"Episode 6"	July 23, 2008	6.22
328	7	"Episode 7"	July 27, 2008	5.84
329	8	"Episode 8"	July 29, 2008	6.08
330	9	"Episode 9"	July 31, 2008	6.39
331	10	"Episode 10"	August 3, 2008	6.61
332	11	"Episode 11"	August 5, 2008	6.45
333	12	"Episode 12"	August 7, 2008	5.53
334	13	"Episode 13"	August 10, 2008	5.40
335	14	"Episode 14"	August 12, 2008	6.36
336	15	"Episode 15"	August 14, 2008	5.86
337	16	"Episode 16"	August 17, 2008	5.53
338	17	"Episode 17"	August 19, 2008	6.12
339	18	"Episode 18"	August 21, 2008	6.17
340	19	"Episode 19"	August 24, 2008	6.04
341	20	"Episode 20"	August 26, 2008	6.28
342	21	"Episode 21"	August 28, 2008	5.97
343	22	"Episode 22"	August 31, 2008	5.70
344	23	"Episode 23"	September 2, 2008	6.46
345	24	"Episode 24"	September 4, 2008	6.58
346	25	"Episode 25"	September 7, 2008	7.20
347	26	"Episode 26"	September 9, 2008	6.98
348	27	"Episode 27"	September 11, 2008	7.82
349	28	"Episode 28"	September 14, 2008	6.68
350	29	"Episode 29"	September 16, 2008	7.56

== Voting history ==
Color key:

Winner
Runner-up
Head of Household
Nominated for eviction
Evicted

Voting history (season 10)
	Week 1	Week 2	Week 3	Week 4	Week 5	Week 6	Week 7		Week 8	Week 9		Finale
	Week 1	Week 2	Week 3	Week 4	Week 5	Week 6	Day 46	Day 52 (Note: This week was a double eviction week. Following the first eviction, the remaining HouseGuests played a week's worth of games, including Head of Household and veto competitions, and nomination, veto and eviction ceremonies, during the live show, culminating in a second eviction for the week.)	Week 8	Day 60	Day 66	Finale
Head of Household	Jerry	Jessie	Keesha	April	Michelle	Renny	Dan	Keesha	Jerry	Dan	Dan	(None)
Nominations (initial)	Jessie; Renny	Dan; Steven	Angie; Jessie	Jessie; Memphis	Keesha; Libra	April; Jerry	Jerry; Memphis	Jerry; Ollie	Dan; Keesha	Jerry; Memphis	(None)	(None)
Veto winner	Jessie	Michelle	Keesha	Jerry	Jerry	Dan	Memphis	Dan	Memphis	Memphis	(None)	(None)
Nominations (final)	Brian; Renny	Dan; Steven	Angie; Jessie	Jessie; Memphis	Keesha; Libra	April; Jerry	Jerry; Michelle	Jerry; Ollie	Keesha; Renny	Jerry; Keesha	Jerry; Memphis	(None)
Dan	Renny	Nominated	Angie	Jessie (Note: As America's Player, Dan's vote to evict was controlled by the audience vote. The audience voted to evict Jessie.)	Libra	April	Head of Household	Ollie	Renny	Head of Household	Jerry (Note: As Head of Household, Dan chose to evict Jerry.)	Winner
Memphis	Brian	Steven	Angie	Nominated	Libra	April	Michelle	Ollie	Renny	Keesha	Nominated	Runner-up
Jerry	Head of Household	Steven	Angie	Memphis	Libra	Nominated	Nominated	Nominated	Head of Household	Nominated	Evicted (Day 66)	Dan
Keesha	Brian	Steven	Head of Household	Jessie	Nominated	April	Michelle	Head of Household	Nominated	Nominated	Evicted (Day 64)	Dan
Renny	Nominated	Steven	Angie	Jessie	Libra	Head of Household	Michelle	Ollie	Nominated	Evicted (Day 59)		Dan
Ollie	Brian	Steven	Angie	Memphis	Libra	Jerry	Jerry	Nominated	Evicted (Day 52)			Dan
Michelle	Brian	Steven	Angie	Memphis	Head of Household	April	Nominated	Evicted (Day 52)				Dan
April	Brian	Steven	Angie	Head of Household	Libra	Nominated	Evicted (Day 45)					Dan
Libra	Brian	Steven	Angie	Jessie	Nominated	Evicted (Day 38)						Dan
Jessie	Brian	Head of Household	Nominated	Nominated	Evicted (Day 31)							
Angie	Brian	Steven	Nominated	Evicted (Day 24)								
Steven	Brian	Nominated	Evicted (Day 16)									
Brian	Nominated	Evicted (Day 9)										
Evicted	Brian; 9 of 10 votes to evict	Steven; 9 of 9 votes to evict	Angie; 8 of 8 votes to evict	Jessie; 4 of 7 votes to evict	Libra; 6 of 6 votes to evict	April; 4 of 5 votes to evict	Michelle; 3 of 4 votes to evict	Ollie; 3 of 3 votes to evict	Renny; 2 of 2 votes to evict	Keesha; Memphis' choice to evict	Jerry; Dan's choice to evict	Dan; 7 votes to win
Evicted	Brian; 9 of 10 votes to evict	Steven; 9 of 9 votes to evict	Angie; 8 of 8 votes to evict	Jessie; 4 of 7 votes to evict	Libra; 6 of 6 votes to evict	April; 4 of 5 votes to evict	Michelle; 3 of 4 votes to evict	Ollie; 3 of 3 votes to evict	Renny; 2 of 2 votes to evict	Keesha; Memphis' choice to evict	Jerry; Dan's choice to evict	Memphis; 0 votes to win

== America's Player ==
Viewers from Canada and the United States had control over a player from July 29 to August 7. Dan, after accepting the offer by America to become their designated player, was asked to complete various tasks that America specified for a chance to win $20,000 at the end of the week. Once Dan received the tasks, he made meaningful efforts to complete the tasks in any way he could.

Task	Date given	Description	Options	America's selection	Result
1	July 29	Who do you want to become the next America's Player?	All HouseGuests	Dan	Accepted
2	July 31	Which HouseGuest do you want Dan to try to get nominated?	All HouseGuests	Jessie	Completed
3	August 3	Which HouseGuest do you want Dan to hug for ten seconds?	All HouseGuests	Jessie	Completed
4	August 5	Which HouseGuest do you want Dan to vote to evict?	Jessie, Memphis	Jessie	Completed

== Production ==
=== Development ===
Speculation on the show not returning for the Summer 2008 Television Season developed as the previous series had been accelerated to the second half of the 2007-08 television season as part of replacement programming following the writers' strike. However, CBS announced on March 17, 2008, following speculation that it would not be returning that the Series Ten would be a summer 2008 broadcast. Casting for Big Brother 10 began on February 25, 2008. Applications were due on April 25, 2008, and video tape submissions were due on April 4, 2008. During May 2008 interviews for the 40 semi-finalists were held with the finalists being chosen on May 21, 2008. Casting calls were held in various cities across the country including Los Angeles, California, Charleston, South Carolina, Louisville, Kentucky, Minneapolis, Minnesota, Pittsburgh, Pennsylvania and Phoenix, Arizona. Series producer Allison Grodner stated "We’re going to have our wildest group yet. We’ve found some very extreme personalities with very extreme points of view." Big Brother 8 winner Dick Donato later announced on House Calls that Big Brother 10 would feature a wider range of HouseGuests. Grodner later confirmed that the cast of Big Brother 10 would feature no pre-existing relationships, making it the first season since Big Brother 3 to do so. Grodner later stated "Big Brother 9 involved couples, singles, and soul mates who were young, single, impulsive, and ready to party. We do a 180 with Big Brother 10. This summer you’re going to find a 22-year-old body builder and a 75-year-old great grandpa in the house, and everyone else in between. We’ve had diversity of age in past, but he’s clearly the oldest contestant we’ve ever had." The cast was officially revealed on July 8.

=== House ===
The house used for Big Brother 10 had a "classics" theme, with areas such as the kitchen being decorated in the style of an old diner. The outside of the house is decorated to look like a standard two-story home. One bedroom features a black and red color theme, while another was decorated with items promoting peace and love. A third bedroom featured props such as a stuffed poodle for a HouseGuest to keep. The living room features several green colored couches. The living room is connected to the kitchen, which is connected to the HoH stairway and a hallway. There is one door in the hallway, which features a spa available to the HouseGuests. The hallway then leads to the bathroom. Workout equipment can also be found outside in the backyard, and is available for use at any time. There are also multiple lawn chairs that the HouseGuests may use to lay out in the sun, along with a swimming pool and a hot tub. The washing machine and dryer are also outside for the HouseGuests to use. There is also a large couch under a roof by the sliding glass door that the HouseGuests may use in case of rain.

=== Prizes ===
The 13 HouseGuests this season were competing for the main prize of $500,000. The winner of the series, determined by the previously evicted HouseGuests, would win the $500,000 prize, while the Runner-Up would receive a $50,000 prize. Other than the main prize, various luxuries and prizes were given out throughout the season.

The fan-favorite award introduced in season seven, America's Favorite Juror, was awarded to a member from the Jury of Seven for a $25,000 prize. This is the last season to have only Jury members eligible for the Public vote; beginning in season 11, the eligibility for the fan poll is extended to all evicted HouseGuests including the winner, but not expelled or withdrawn HouseGuests, with the award being renamed America's Favorite HouseGuest to reflect this.

== Broadcast ==
Big Brother 10 was broadcast on CBS from July 13, 2008, to September 16, 2008. This season lasted a total of 71 days, making it the shortest season of the series to date. This season initially featured no changes to the schedule that was used in the previous edition, with episodes airing on Tuesdays, Wednesdays, and Sunday each week. The Wednesday episode, which aired at 8 pm Eastern Time, featured the live eviction and subsequent Head of Household competition taking place. During the live eviction, the show was hosted by Julie Chen. The Sunday episode, which aired at 8 pm Eastern Time, featured the food competition and nomination ceremony, as well as some highlights from the previous days. The Tuesday episode, which aired at 9 pm Eastern Time, featured the Power of Veto competition and the Power of Veto ceremony, along with more highlights of recent events in the game. Some changes to the scheduling format were made. Before the third eviction, it was announced that the eviction episode would be moved to Thursday, matching the schedule previously used in Big Brother 8.

Much like the previous editions, the live feeds were also available again for this season. HouseGuests enter the house a few days before the premiere, and the feeds are not live for the first few days. They later go live after the broadcast of the launch episode. This season saw the return of the spin-off series House Calls: The Big Brother Talk Show. The series featured a different co-host each week, as it had since the seventh season. The web series aired thirty-minute episodes on weeknights, and allowed fans to call in and express their opinions on the events of the game. Evicted HouseGuests were also interviewed on the series following their eviction. This season also saw the return of the Big Brother: After Dark spin-off series, which aired on Showtime Too nightly from midnight to 3 a.m. Eastern Time. The show served as a live feed into the house, and was edited only for slanderous statements and music copyrights. Much like the previous season, Big Brother 10 is available for digital purchasing on iTunes and Amazon.com.

== Reception ==
=== Ratings ===
Big Brother 10 aired episodes three times a week, with shows airing Sundays at 8 p.m., Tuesdays at 9 p.m., and Thursdays at 8 p.m. Originally the live eviction was scheduled for Wednesdays at 8 p.m. but on July 25, 2008, CBS announced Big Brother and Greatest American Dog would swap nights effective on July 31, 2008, returning the live eviction to Thursdays. The premiere episode which aired Sunday July 13, 2008 scored 6.29 million viewers, which was the "lowest rated season premiere for the show."

=== Critical response ===
Big Brother 10 came under fire from critics such as the Parents Television Council for airing the word "fucking" during the Tuesday, August 5 episode of the show. The event in question was aired during an argument between Libra and Jessie in which Libra said, "Memphis was in the fucking room!"
