= Dan Gheesling =

American reality television personality (born 1983)

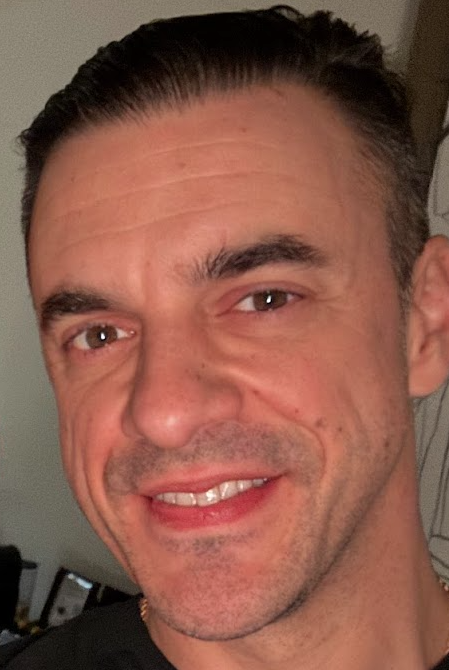
- Gheesling in 2026
- Born: Daniel Robert Gheesling; September 1, 1983 (age 43); Dearborn, Michigan, U.S.
- Education: Michigan State University (BS; MS)
- Occupations: TV personality; Twitch streamer; YouTuber
- Television: Big Brother 10; Big Brother 14; The Traitors 2
- Spouse: Chelsea Gheesling
- Children: 3

Twitch information
- Channel: DanGheesling
- Years active: 2012–present
- Genre: Video gaming
- Followers: 136,000

YouTube information
- Channel: Dan Gheesling
- Years active: 2012–present
- Genre: Video gaming
- Subscribers: 127,000
- Views: 76.7 million
- Last updated: November 4, 2026

Daniel Robert Gheesling (/ˈɡiːzliŋ/; born September 1, 1983) is an American reality television and YouTube personality. Gheesling is best known for winning the tenth season of the CBS reality show Big Brother in 2008. He subsequently returned to Big Brother for the fourteenth season where he finished as runner-up, and he later competed on the second season of The Traitors, where he was the first traitor eliminated.

Gheesling is widely regarded as one of the greatest Big Brother contestants of all time. He is one of only two contestants to have both won and finished as runner-up, and was voted the show's best winner by viewers during its 1,000th episode in 2026.

Outside of reality television, Gheesling has a Twitch channel where he primarily streams video game content.

== Early life ==
Dan Gheesling was born on September 1, 1983 in Dearborn, Michigan. He attended Michigan State University, where he earned a bachelor's degree in human resource management in May 2005 and a master's degree in Kinesiology in 2006.

During his tenure at Michigan State University, Gheesling pursued a career in football coaching. He joined the Michigan State Spartans football program in 2002 and earned the Frank Cowing Award as the outgoing senior manager in 2004. During that time Gheesling also interned with the National Football League’s Detroit Lions. In 2006, Gheesling continued to work with the Spartans as the team's Defensive Graduate Assistant.

== Career ==
=== Big Brother ===
After auditioning 3 times, Gheesling was selected to participate in the tenth season of Big Brother in 2008. On Day 71, he was crowned the winner against runner-up Robert "Memphis" Garrett by a 7–0 jury vote. Gheesling won $500,000 and became the first Big Brother contestant to win by a unanimous jury vote.

Gheesling returned for Big Brother 14 in 2012, initially as one of four returning competitors from past seasons who served as coaches for the other houseguests. He finished as runner-up to the eventual winner Ian Terry by a 1–6 jury vote, winning $50,000. During the season, Gheesling became known for "Dan's Funeral", a successful maneuver to defend himself and his ally Danielle from an eviction nomination; Gheesling first held a "funeral" for himself ahead of his anticipated eviction, in which he staged a mock betrayal of Danielle to build sympathy towards her from the other houseguests. Using the reaction to the funeral as a distraction, he then negotiated an alliance between the Head of Household Frank, Danielle, and Power of Veto holder Jenn to target Britney for his affiliation with Ian (who was then exposed for orchestrating the eviction of his coach Mike Boogie, and of planning to betray the Quack Pack alliance, but held a Golden Power of Veto). Jenn used her PoV to save Dan, and Frank nominated Britney instead, leading to her eventual eviction. In retrospectives, "Dan's Funeral" has been considered one of the greatest moments in Big Brother history.

Gheesling made a cameo appearance during Big Brother 19, playing "The Funeral Director" in the superhero movie parody The Revengers alongside other former contestants to introduce the "BB Comics" challenge. During the series' 1000th episode in 2026, Gheesling was named the winner of viewer votes for the best Big Brother winner (Big Brother 10) and best moment ("Dan's Funeral") of all-time.

Gheesling is one of three contestants, alongside Cody Calafiore and Paul Abrahamian, to reach the final two in two seasons of Big Brother (United States), and he and Calafiore are the only contestants to have both won and finished as runner-up. Gheesling has been regarded by many as one of the greatest contestants in the history of the series.

=== The Traitors ===
Gheesling participated on the second season of The Traitors in 2024. He was the first "Traitor" to be voted off in the sixth episode. Polygon described Gheesling's appearance on The Traitors as "facing an uphill battle" and doing "too little, too late."

=== Twitch ===
Gheesling has been streaming on Twitch since 2012. Gheesling played an early version of a video game Balatro and beat Elden Ring DLC Shadow of the Erdtree with no upgrades. The creator of Balatro, LocalThunk, recognized Gheesling's gameplay on Twitch for making the game increasingly popular.

On April 13, 2026, Gheesling and fellow streamer Northernlion announced the "Northernlion Supercruise", a six-day cruise that was set to take place in March 2027 with ticket prices starting at $1,800. On April 16, Gheesling announced that the cruise had been canceled and began issuing refunds.

In September 2026, Gheesling participated in a U.S. Army-sponsored livestream for three days involving a bootcamp-style game show. Gheesling faced heavy criticism from his community and later apologized, saying it was "never [his] intention to upset anyone," but said that he "had a job to do," and "couldn't breach the contract." Northernlion, who worked with Gheesling earlier in 2026 on the "Northernlion Supercruise," later condemned Gheesling in a livestream saying that "it would be unacceptable if it was just sponsored by the Army, but steeped, head to toe, in the imagery, and making it look so awesome – it’s so far beyond the bounds of what is acceptable to me."

== Personal life ==
Following his appearances on Big Brother, Gheesling began work in personal coaching and public speaking.

In 2011, Gheesling married his wife Chelsea. They have three children.

== Filmography ==
=== Television ===
Year	Title	Network	Role	Notes
2008	Big Brother 10	CBS	Contestant	Winner
2012	Big Brother 14	CBS	Contestant	Runner-up
2017	Big Brother 19	CBS	Cameo	—N/a
2024	The Traitors 2	Peacock	Contestant – Traitor	13th Place
2026	Big Brother 28	CBS	Cameo	—N/a
TBA	Destination X	NBC	Contestant	TBA

== Bibliography ==
- Gheesling, Dan (December 3, 2012). How a Normal Guy Got Cast on Reality TV. Mist House Publishing. ISBN 9780615718279.
- Gheesling, Dan (December 24, 2012). Punch It In: 24 Days To Crossing Your Goal Line. Mist House Publishing. ISBN 9780615747811.
- Gheesling, Dan (November 26, 2013). Clean Your Own Mirror: 6 Necessary Duties to Lead and Influence People. Mist House Publishing. ISBN 9780615925530.

Preceded by Adam Jasinski	Winner of Big Brother; Season 10	Succeeded by Jordan Lloyd

Preceded by Porsche Briggs	Runner-up of Big Brother; Season 14	Succeeded by GinaMarie Zimmerman
