= Big Brother 17 (American season) =

Coordinates: 34°8′40.12″N 118°23′20.71″W

Big Brother: Takeover
- Season 17
- Big Brother 17 title card
- Hosted by: Julie Chen
- No. of days: 98
- No. of houseguests: 17
- Winner: Steve Moses
- Runner-up: Liz Nolan
- America's Favorite HouseGuest: James Huling
- Companion shows: Big Brother: Live Chat; Big Brother: After Dark
- No. of episodes: 40

Release
- Original network: CBS
- Original release: June 24 – September 23, 2015

Additional information
- Filming dates: June 18 – September 23, 2015

Season chronology
- ← Previous; Season 16 Next → Season 18

Big Brother 17 (also known as Big Brother: Takeover) is the seventeenth season of the American reality television series Big Brother. The season premiered on June 24, 2015 with a two-night premiere with the following episode airing on June 25, 2015, broadcast on CBS in the United States and Global in Canada. The season ended with a 90-minute season finale on September 23, 2015, following the fall season premiere of Survivor: Cambodia, after 98 days of competition. Julie Chen returned as host. On September 23, 2015, Steve Moses was crowned the winner defeating Liz Nolan in a 6–3 jury vote. James Huling was voted as the season's America's Favorite HouseGuest.

== Format ==
Big Brother follows a group of contestants, known as HouseGuests, who live inside a custom-built house outfitted with cameras and microphones recording their every move 24 hours a day. The HouseGuests are sequestered with no contact with the outside world. During their stay, the HouseGuests share their thoughts on their day-to-day lives inside the house in a private room known as the Diary Room. Each week, the HouseGuests compete in competitions in order to win power and safety inside the house.

At the start of each week, the HouseGuests compete in a Head of Household (abbreviated as "HOH") competition. The winner of the HoH competition is immune from eviction and selects two HouseGuests to be nominated for eviction. As with the previous season, the first five weeks of the season feature two concurrent Heads of Household. Each HoH would nominate two HouseGuests for eviction, for a total of four nominees. The two pairs of nominees would then compete in a "Battle of the Block" competition. The winning pair would be removed from the block, with the HoH who nominated them dethroned. The dethroned HoH would later be eligible to be nominated as a replacement if the Veto is used, while the Battle of the Block winners are safe for the rest of the week.

Six HouseGuests are then selected to compete in the Power of Veto (abbreviated as "PoV") competition: the reigning HoH, the nominees, and three other HouseGuests chosen by random draw. The winner of the PoV competition has the right to either revoke the nomination of one of the nominated HouseGuests or leave them as is. If the veto winner uses this power, the HoH must immediately nominate another HouseGuest for eviction. The PoV winner is also immune from being named as the replacement nominee. The HouseGuest overthrown as a result of the Battle of the Block competition is eligible to be nominated by the reigning Head of Household if the Power of Veto is used.

On eviction night, all HouseGuests vote to evict one of the nominees, though the Head of Household and the nominees are not allowed to vote. This vote is conducted in the privacy of the Diary Room. In the event of a tie, the Head of Household casts the tie-breaking vote. The nominee with the most votes is evicted from the house. The last nine evicted HouseGuests comprise the Jury and are sequestered in a separate location following their eviction and ultimately decide the winner of the season. The Jury is only allowed to see the competitions and ceremonies that include all of the remaining HouseGuests; they are not shown any interviews or other footage that might include strategy or details regarding nominations. The viewing public is able to award an additional prize of $25,000 by choosing "America's Favorite HouseGuest". All evicted HouseGuests are eligible to win this award except for those who either voluntarily leave or are forcibly removed.

=== Format changes and additions ===
==== BB Takeover ====
CBS announced the season's twist, BB Takeover, on June 17, 2015, in which a surprise guest would visit the house each week to reveal a different twist to the HouseGuests. Though it was initially announced that there would be a guest every week, there were no Takeovers after Week 3; in an interview during the season, Julie Chen stated that the twist had been cancelled because "there was enough going on” with the other elements of the game, though no official announcement was ever made to the HouseGuests.

Week	Takeover guest	Twist	Effect
1	Phil Keoghan	Two additional HouseGuests	The Amazing Race 26 alumni Jackie and Jeff entered the game.
1	Phil Keoghan	BB Fast Forward	Immunity for the week was granted to the two HouseGuests who sat out of the first HoH competitions and one HouseGuest each of their choice.
2	Kathy Griffin	Last Laugh	The power to block three HouseGuests from voting in the next eviction was granted to the HouseGuest who answered the seventh call to a phone booth in the house.
3	Rob Gronkowski	Gronk Party Week	Have-Nots were removed for the week, provided the HouseGuests participated in Gronk Parties throughout the week.
3	Rob Gronkowski	Luxury competition	All of the week's competition winners earned a chance to win a cabin on a three-day cruise.

==== Battle of the Block ====
The Battle of the block was first introduced in the sixteenth season. In the twist, two houseguests would be nominated by each Head of Household. Each pair of HouseGuests would compete in a Battle of the Block competition. Whichever pair won would have safety for the week, and the Head of Household who nominated them would be dethroned, leaving one Head of Household remaining.

==== Twin Twist ====
As with the fifth season, a pair of twins competed as one HouseGuest, switching every few days between the house and a sequestered location off-site. The twins, Liz and Julia, played as Liz, changing places in the Diary Room with approximately ten minutes to catch each other up. After the twins survived the first five evictions, the twist was revealed and both twins competed separately. Though the twist was not officially revealed to the other HouseGuests before its completion, the twins were allowed to discuss it freely.

== HouseGuests ==
On June 16, 2015, 14 HouseGuests were announced by CBS, including Audrey Middleton, the first transgender contestant to appear on the American version of Big Brother, professional wrestler and former WWE NXT competitor Austin Matelson and Vanessa Rousso, who, when the season began, was ranked among the top five women in poker history in terms of all-time money winnings. On June 25, 2015, The Amazing Race 26 alumni Jackie Ibarra and Jeff Weldon were revealed as the 15th and 16th HouseGuests as part of the first Takeover. It was later revealed that HouseGuest Liz Nolan and her twin sister, Julia, were competing as one for the Twin Twist; after surviving the first five evictions, the twins began competing separately, increasing the total number of HouseGuests to 17, the most ever in an American season of Big Brother.

Name	Age on entry	Occupation	Residence	Day entered	Result
Steve Moses	22	College student	Gouverneur, New York	1	Winner; Day 98
Liz Nolan	23	Marketing coordinator	Miami, Florida	1	Runner-up; Day 98
Vanessa Rousso	32	Professional poker player	Las Vegas, Nevada	1	Evicted; Day 98
John McGuire	27	Dentist	Scranton, Pennsylvania	71	Evicted; Day 91
John McGuire	27	Dentist	Scranton, Pennsylvania	1	Evicted; Day 71
Austin Matelson	30	Professional wrestler	Woodland Hills, California	1	Evicted; Day 89
Julia Nolan	23	Marketing intern	Miami, Florida	43	Evicted; Day 85
James Huling	31	Retail associate	Wichita Falls, Texas	1	Evicted; Day 78
Meg Maley	25	Server	New York, New York	1	Evicted; Day 78
Becky Burgess	26	Retail manager	Denver, Colorado	1	Evicted; Day 64
Jackie Ibarra	27	Professional dancer	Las Vegas, Nevada	1	Evicted; Day 57
Shelli Poole	33	Interior designer	Atlanta, Georgia	1	Evicted; Day 57
Clay Honeycutt	23	Graduate student	College Station, Texas	1	Evicted; Day 50
Jason Roy	25	Supermarket cashier	Swansea, Massachusetts	1	Evicted; Day 43
Audrey Middleton	25	Digital media consultant	Villa Rica, Georgia	1	Evicted; Day 36
Jeff Weldon	26	Account executive	Tampa, Florida	1	Evicted; Day 29
Da'Vonne Rogers	27	Poker dealer	Inglewood, California	1	Evicted; Day 22
Jason "Jace" Agolli	23	Personal trainer	Venice Beach, California	1	Evicted; Day 15

=== Future appearances ===
In the Big Brother version of The Price Is Right, James Huling and Da'Vonne Rogers were both selected as competitors of the show. In 2016, Huling and Rogers both returned as HouseGuests on Big Brother 18. Later that year, Jason Roy competed on Big Brother: Over the Top, while Liz Nolan made an appearance for a Halloween event. In 2020, Rogers returned for a third time to compete on Big Brother: All-Stars.

Outside Big Brother, Da'Vonne Rogers also competed on MTV's The Challenge: Final Reckoning. Later in 2019, Rogers returned alongside Liz & Julia Nolan on The Challenge: War of the Worlds. In 2022, Rogers appeared on the fifth season of Ex on the Beach. In 2024, Rogers competed on the Amazon Freevee reality TV series The Goat. In 2025, Rogers competed on the fifth season of The Challenge: All Stars.

In 2025, the Nolan twins made a cameo appearance in the Week 3 HOH Competition in Big Brother 27.

== Episodes ==
No. overall	No. in season	Title	Day(s)	Original release date
Week 1
546	1	"Episode 1"	Day 1	June 24, 2015
Eight new HouseGuests entered the Big Brother house: Audrey, Austin, Clay, Da'Vonne, Jace, James, Meg, and Shelli. During introductions, both Clay and Da'Vonne withheld their professions as a former football player and poker dealer, respectively, while Audrey revealed that she is a trans woman, which received a universally positive reaction from her fellow HouseGuests. A mutual attraction began to form between Clay and Shelli, as did an early alliance between Audrey, Da'Vonne, and Shelli. Julie Chen revealed the return of the Battle of the Block twist and announced the first Head of Household competition. First, the HouseGuests were told that one of them would have to sit out of the competition; Da'Vonne volunteered in exchange for none of the others nominating her, to which they all agreed.: Head of Household ("Flying Tomatoes"): The HouseGuests, standing on movable perches, were pelted with plastic tomatoes; as HouseGuests fell off, they were eliminated. The first HouseGuest to catch ten tomatoes or the last one remaining on the perch, whichever occurred first, became the first Head of Household.; Audrey, Jace, James, and Shelli were the final four competitors remaining, but all fell off at the same time; upon review of the footage, James was determined to have fallen off last, so he was named the first Head of Household. The HouseGuests were told about the BB Takeover, in which a new twist would be introduced every week. Addressing the viewing public, Julie revealed the final twist, which would be kept secret from the HouseGuests. Known as the Twin Twist, a pair of identical twins would be taking turns competing as one, earning the right to play as individuals, provided they survive the first five evictions.
547	2	"Episode 2"	Day 1	June 25, 2015
Six more new HouseGuests—Becky, Jason, John, Liz, Steve, and Vanessa—entered the Big Brother house. As the 14 HouseGuests met each other, Vanessa withheld her profession as a poker player, while Jace noticed that there were two empty seats at the dinner table. For the first BB Takeover, The Amazing Race host Phil Keoghan introduced two new HouseGuests: The Amazing Race 26 alumni Jackie and Jeff. As with the first group, one of the six new HouseGuests was instructed to sit out of the other Head of Household competition; Vanessa volunteered and the HouseGuests agreed not to nominate her as they did with Da'Vonne earlier.: Head of Household ("UFOh No"): The seven HouseGuests held onto a pole while a harness pulled them upward. The last HouseGuest left hanging onto their pole became the second Head of Household.; When only Jackie and Jason remained, Jason promised her that he wouldn't nominate her if she dropped out of the competition; she did, and Jason won. After the competition, Phil returned to inform Da'Vonne and Vanessa that they would receive repercussions for sitting out of the competitions.
548	3	"Episode 3"	Days 1–7	June 28, 2015
Heads of Household James and Jason formed an alliance and discussed possible targets. Former Amazing Race partners Jackie and Jeff decided to keep their distance from each other to decrease their targets and be perceived as individuals. Phil returned and granted Da'Vonne and Vanessa the BB Fast Forward, which granted them immunity for the week, along with immunity for one HouseGuest each of their choice. Vanessa held court to help her with her decision and settled on Austin. Da'Vonne decided not to protect her allies Audrey and Shelli in order to hide their alliance and picked Liz instead. Da'Vonne's decision angered Shelli, and she later flirted with Clay, which made Da'Vonne question her loyalty. Austin and Jace bonded and later formed an alliance called ShellTown, but Jace's brash remarks and physique made him a target to several HouseGuests, including Jason. James and Jason teamed up with Audrey and Da'Vonne to backdoor Jace and tried to recruit other HouseGuests to be nominated as pawns. Jason nominated Becky and John while James nominated Jackie and Steve.: Battle of the Block ("DuBoB"): The pairs navigated a series of balance beams to transport blocks to a platform and used them to build a tower according to a blueprint. The first pair that built their tower correctly earned safety for the week and dethroned the Head of Household who nominated them.; Becky and John won the competition, dethroning Jason and keeping James in power.
549	4	"Episode 4"	Days 7–10	July 1, 2015
Needing seven votes to evict Jace, James recruited Meg and Clay to join him, Audrey, Da'Vonne, and Jason. Jace decided to streak, which further annoyed the other HouseGuests, including his closest ally, Austin. To save themselves, Austin and Jace formed an alliance with Audrey and James, who had no intention of deviating from their initial plan to take out Jace. While preparing for a possible future counting competition, Da'Vonne wandered into all the rooms, alarming Clay, Jeff, and Shelli, which led to both factions plotting against each other. Jeff and Clay's attempts to address the situation led to further confrontations, and Audrey later tried to get Clay and Da'Vonne to make up, to no avail. Audrey and Da'Vonne independently considered betraying each other—Audrey for Da'Vonne's attitude and Da'Vonne for Audrey's constant meddling. James had to choose four Have-Nots; he picked the four HouseGuests protected by the BB Fast Forward—Austin, Da'Vonne, Liz, and Vanessa. When picking players for the Power of Veto competition, John, Jason, and Becky were selected to compete.: Power of Veto ("Nose-a Scotia"): The six competitors dug for pieces with a letter on them; each letter had an assigned point value. The HouseGuest who made the correctly-spelled word that was worth the most points won the Power of Veto.; Steve won the Power of Veto with the word "trombonists." Audrey decided to bring Jeff and Shelli into her main alliance, but her incessant strategizing in the middle of the night alienated her allies, making James consider putting her up as the replacement nominee. However, at the Veto Meeting, Steve used the Power of Veto on himself, and James followed through on his original plan and nominated Jace.
550	5	"Episode 5"	Days 10–15	July 2, 2015
After his nomination, an agitated Jace attempted to rally support, to no avail. Audrey told Jace that she had no part in his nomination but later told him that the whole house was involved; he saw through her lies and later threatened to expose her manipulations. Host Julie Chen revealed that Liz and her twin sister, Julia, were competing as one in the Twin Twist and would switch places again while casting a vote that night. During the live eviction, everyone except Audrey voted against Jace, and he became the first HouseGuest to be evicted from the house. Actress and comedian Kathy Griffin arrived for the season's second takeover and revealed to the viewing public that there would be a telephone booth in the house, ringing periodically. The HouseGuest who answered the seventh call would earn the right to stop three HouseGuests from voting in the next eviction.: Head of Household ("Ginger Fever"): Divided into two groups of seven by random draw, the HouseGuests raced to assemble a puzzle. The first HouseGuest in each round that assembled their puzzle became the new Heads of Household.; Becky and Shelli won their respective rounds and became the new Heads of Household.
Week 2
551	6	"Episode 6"	Days 13–16	July 5, 2015
Two days before Jace's eviction, Audrey told her alliance that Vanessa was the leader of an opposing, all-girls alliance and then told Vanessa that Da'Vonne had started that rumor. After Vanessa tried to talk things out with Da'Vonne, Da'Vonne realized that Audrey had been lying and called an alliance meeting; after Audrey refused to own up to her machinations, she was exiled from her alliance. With Becky and Shelli as the Heads of Household, the HouseGuests scrambled to ensure their safety, except for Audrey, who decided to lie low to reduce her target. Becky proposed backdooring Audrey; while Shelli initially agreed, she later conspired with Clay and Jeff to target Da'Vonne after their altercation the previous week. The trio recruited John to be nominated as a pawn and told him to throw the Battle of the Block competition while pledging that they would do whatever they could to ensure his safety. Shelli nominated Da'Vonne and John while Becky, still hoping to backdoor Audrey, nominated Jason—as payback for him putting her up the previous week—and Steve.: Battle of the Block ("Give Me Props"): The pairs, conjoined by a single shirt and a three-legged pair of pants, operated nine cameras and repositioned them to follow a shot list; the cameras corresponded to a specific shot but were unlabeled. The first pair that correctly lined up all nine cameras earned safety for the week and dethroned the Head of Household who nominated them.; Jason and Steve only operated two cameras at a time, which proved to be an effective strategy. Meanwhile, Da'Vonne's idea to turn on all nine cameras at once put her and John at a disadvantage, and he didn't even need to actively try to throw the competition. Jason and Steve handily won the competition, dethroning Becky and keeping Shelli in power and putting the plan to backdoor Audrey in jeopardy.
552	7	"Episode 7"	Days 16–19	July 8, 2015
While a dethroned Becky was convinced that the plan to backdoor Audrey was still on the agenda, Shelli continued to plot Da'Vonne's eviction. When picking players for the Power of Veto competition, Meg, Steve, and Clay were drawn to join Shelli, Da'Vonne, and John.: Power of Veto ("High Maintenance"): Two competitors would be given a list of seven items and then shown an image with six of those items. The first competitor to press their buzzer after retrieving the missing item from an adjacent room would win the round, and the other competitor would be eliminated from the competition. If the first player to press their buzzer brought back a wrong item, they would be eliminated. The winner would then choose one of the remaining competitors to play in the next round who in turn would choose their opponent. The last competitor remaining won the Power of Veto.; In the final round, John beat Clay to win the Power of Veto, which forced Shelli to find a replacement nominee. After unsuccessfully trying to get John to not use the Veto on himself, Shelli considered nominating Liz. Liz's allies Austin and Vanessa tried to get Shelli to put Meg up instead, telling Shelli that Meg was going to work with Da'Vonne, James, and Jason to save Da'Vonne and target Clay and Shelli and that the only way to ensure Da'Vonne's eviction was to nominate Meg as a pawn. Audrey later reprimanded Clay for being condescending, which prompted Clay to convince Shelli to nominate Audrey instead. However, at the Veto Meeting, after John used the Power of Veto on himself, Shelli decided to listen to Austin and Vanessa and nominated Meg.
553	8	"Episode 8"	Days 19–22	July 9, 2015
A telephone booth appeared in the house for Kathy's BB Takeover, and she told the HouseGuests about the Last Laugh twist. Da'Vonne answered the seventh call and earned the power to stop three of the HouseGuests from voting in the upcoming eviction, which meant that she only needed five votes to survive the eviction. Da'Vonne and Jason suspected that Liz had been playing with a twin and alerted the other HouseGuests. Da'Vonne tried to use this information as leverage to secure Liz's vote. At the live eviction, Da'Vonne used the power of the Last Laugh to stop Becky, Jackie, and Jeff from voting, but it didn't matter, as she was evicted anyway after everyone except Audrey and Jason voted against her, and she became the second HouseGuest to be evicted from the house. New England Patriots tight end Rob Gronkowski kicked off his BB Takeover, Gronk's Party Week, by announcing that there would be no Have-Nots that week.: Head of Household ("Gronk Pong"): One at a time, each HouseGuest launched a ball toward 55 oversized cups arranged in the shape of a triangle. Each cup had its own unique point value; the two HouseGuests with the highest scores became the new Heads of Household.; Austin became the first new Head of Household while James, Liz, and Vanessa tied for second; Vanessa won the tiebreaker and became the second new Head of Household.
Week 3
554	9	"Episode 9"	Days 21–23	July 12, 2015
The night before Da'Vonne's eviction, Vanessa confronted Liz, not knowing it was actually Julia, about the rumors of her being a twin, which Julia confessed to, and Vanessa brought in Austin, Clay, and Shelli to protect the twins and ensure that they make it past the first five evictions in order to increase their numbers. The next night, Julia and Liz switched again, and Liz joined her new allies in officially forming the Sixth Sense alliance. Allies and new Heads of Household Austin and Vanessa planned to target Jeff and James as the strongest members of the opposing alliance with James as the upfront target and Jeff to be potentially backdoored. Austin and Vanessa planned for Vanessa to remain Head of Household after the Battle of the Block to allow her to improve her social connections. Austin nominated Jason and Meg, Jeff and James's allies, while Vanessa nominated James and John, who again had been recruited to throw the Battle of the Block competition in exchange for future protection. To remove suspicion, Austin told his nominees that Audrey, not Jeff, was the backdoor target.: Battle of the Block ("Gronk's A-maze-ing Foam Party"): One at a time, a competitor searched through a pile of clothing for a patterned item and then waded through a foam maze to deliver it to the person wearing that pattern. After bringing the person to the starting platform, the player then switched out with their partner. The first pair that brought ten people out of the maze earned safety for the week and dethroned the Head of Household who nominated them.; For the second week in a row, John had no need to throw the competition, as James was confused by the patterns. Jason and Meg won the competition, dethroning Austin and keeping Vanessa in power.
555	10	"Episode 10"	Days 23–26	July 15, 2015
To minimize the blood on her hands, Vanessa decided she was not going to try to backdoor Jeff, though Jeff made himself more of a target after telling Austin that he wanted to target Shelli and talking about his suspicions about Liz being a twin. Audrey, Austin, and Shelli were randomly chosen to compete in the Veto competition. In order to justify not nominating her as a replacement if the Veto was used, Vanessa conspired with the Sixth Sense to throw the competition to Audrey.: Power of Veto ("Gronk and Roll"): Two players in giant six-sided dice went head-to-head. A number between one and six would be randomly selected, and the two competitors maneuvered around the playing field attempting to return to their starting platform with the correct number on top. The first to do so stayed in the competition, eliminating their opponent. After five rounds, the last competitor remaining won the Power of Veto.; The plot to throw the competition to Audrey was foiled after she was defeated by John, and he went on to defeat Austin in the final round to earn his second consecutive Veto. Vanessa, now needing to find a replacement nominee, accused Austin of throwing the final round to John. As part of Rob Gronkowski's BB Takeover, he mandated that all HouseGuests participate in parties; any non-participating HouseGuests would become Have-Nots. All of the HouseGuests participated. Jeff talked to Vanessa to ensure his safety and realized that she had no intention of nominating Audrey. Jason then alerted Jeff to the fact that Austin and Vanessa were working together, which Jeff told Clay, unaware that Clay was also working with them. Austin decided to call Jeff out for talking against him, and Jeff's resulting confrontation with Vanessa provided enough reason for her to nominate him.: Luxury Competition: The week's competition winners—Austin, Vanessa, Jason, Meg, and John—picked a cup at random; one of the cups had a chip at the bottom that would earn its owner a cabin on a three-day cruise with Rob.; Meg won the Luxury Competition. After John used the Power of Veto on himself for a second consecutive week, Vanessa nominated Jeff in his place.
556	11	"Episode 11"	Days 26–29	July 16, 2015
While Jeff worked hard to apologize and campaign, James took a more laid-back approach. Liz returned to the house, much to the delight of Austin, who had been developing feelings for her. Jeff, during his campaign, told Liz that he knew about the Twin Twist, and she decided to flirt with him in order to control him. Austin walked in on the two lying in bed together under the covers, which made him angry and jealous. Jeff's campaigning ultimately earned him votes from Jackie, John, Liz, and Steve, but it wasn't enough, as he became the third HouseGuest to be evicted from the house after the other seven voters voted against him.: Head of Household ("Bustin' Moves"): The HouseGuests were asked true or false questions based on a 1990s-inspired dance routine they had just watched; HouseGuests who answered incorrectly were eliminated. The last two HouseGuests remaining became the new Heads of Household.; After just three questions, Liz and Shelli became the new Heads of Household.
Week 4
557	12	"Episode 12"	Days 29–30	July 19, 2015
After it was revealed that four people voted to save Jeff, members of the Sixth Sense tried to figure out who the four were, unaware that one was among them—Liz. With Liz as one of the new Heads of Household, HouseGuests suspicious about her being a twin—especially John—scoured her new bedroom for clues. Jackie, now without any allies thanks to Jeff's eviction, was approached by Austin in order to potentially work with her later and told her that she was likely to be nominated by Liz. After Jackie discussed her impending nomination with Shelli, Shelli considered severing ties with the volatile Austin. Audrey told Shelli that Jason was coming after her; deciding to target him, Shelli and Clay recruited John to be a pawn, this time to ensure that Jason went home. Liz nominated Jackie and James while Shelli nominated Jason and John. After Liz assured Jackie that she was safe, Jackie asked Liz who the real target was, which angered Liz. Shelli told Jason that Audrey had told her that he was targeting her, which Jason denied. After Audrey told Shelli that it was a lie, Shelli considered nominating her if the Power of Veto was used.: Battle of the Block ("Grunge BoB"): The pairs dove through mudhoney to get to four zones themed after grunge bands from the 1990s—Pearl Jam, Screaming Trees, Soundgarden, and Smashing Pumpkins—to find one key in each. They then used the four keys to unlock a mannequin, Alice, tied up in chains. The first pair that unchained Alice and took her to Nirvana, the finish platform, won the competition.; Though Jason and John had an early lead, they fell behind in the pumpkin smashing zone, which allowed Jackie and James to come from behind to win the competition, dethroning Liz and keeping Shelli in power and putting the plan to backdoor Audrey in jeopardy again. As punishment for losing the competition or being dethroned, Jason, John, and Liz were forced to dress up as a boy band and dance together at routine intervals.
558	13	"Episode 13"	Days 30–33	July 22, 2015
Audrey, having exposed her manipulations to Shelli, vented her frustration to James and urged him to target Shelli and Clay if he ever became Head of Household; he subsequently ratted her out. Clay later discussed it with Audrey while trying to dissuade her paranoia regarding being backdoored. When picking players for the Power of Veto competition, James, Meg, and Vanessa were chosen to compete. After Audrey wasn't chosen to compete for the Veto, all of those chosen plotted to use it on John so that Shelli could nominate Audrey as the replacement, though Shelli was later distraught regarding her impending decision.: Power of Veto ("Saved by the Smell"): In each round, the six competitors were given a list of chemicals and then instructed to pour a specific chemical based on a question about the list. If a competitor was incorrect, they would be eliminated and splattered with paint; the last competitor remaining won the Power of Veto.; In the fifth round, Vanessa beat Jason and John to win the competition. After Audrey complained about her loneliness in the game to Clay, he berated her for not trusting their alliance, which quickly escalated into an argument after Audrey denied asking Clay if Shelli was going to backdoor her, leading to subsequent altercations with Shelli and Vanessa. After the confrontations, Audrey secluded herself from the other HouseGuests and didn't even attend the Veto Meeting, although it didn't matter because Vanessa used the Power of Veto on Jason, and Shelli nominated Audrey in his place.
559	14	"Episode 14"	Days 33–36	July 23, 2015
After spending five hours in the Diary Room before the Veto Meeting, Audrey retreated to the Have-Not room, prompting the other HouseGuests to wonder if she would quit the game. Ultimately, Audrey remained in the game until eviction night when she became the fourth HouseGuest to be evicted after everyone except Austin voted against her, and she received a penalty vote for breaking the Have-Not rule by eating regular food.: Head of Household ("Pop Till You Drop"): Two HouseGuests, competing head-to-head, listened to a 1990s pop song about a past competition. The first to buzz in with the correct competition type ("Head of Household," "Battle of the Block," or "Power of Veto") won the round, and the other HouseGuest was eliminated. If the first player to buzz in was wrong, they were eliminated and the other HouseGuest would choose the next match-up. The last two HouseGuests remaining became the new Heads of Household.; Jackie and Vanessa were the last two HouseGuests standing and became the new Heads of Household.
Week 5
560	15	"Episode 15"	Days 35–37	July 26, 2015
The night before Audrey's eviction, Austin told Jason about the Twin Twist in order to gain his trust, and Austin told Jason that he would consider voting Julia out before Jury so that he could be alone in the house with Liz. Jason, along with Meg, told Shelli and Vanessa, both of whom continued to lose trust in Austin. After the eviction and the Head of Household competition, Austin lied to Vanessa about his conversation with Jason, and she conspired with Clay, Shelli, and Jackie to betray him. Jackie and Vanessa decided to work together to backdoor Austin and to ensure that Jackie became the surviving Head of Household as Vanessa had already been the surviving Head of Household once before. Vanessa nominated Becky and a volunteering Clay with the hope that they would win and be safe while Jackie nominated Liz and James, who had been recruited to throw the Battle of the Block. An alliance of Vanessa, Jackie, Shelli, Clay, Jason, James, Becky, and Meg called Dark Moon was formed with the idea of them being the final eight HouseGuests.: Battle of the Block ("Splashy Headlines"): The pairs threw paint around a room to reveal letters that spelled the names of three Big Brother 16 HouseGuests. The first pair to correctly identify the three names earned safety for the week, and they, plus the surviving Head of Household, won a private Outback Steakhouse dinner.; The plan to backdoor Austin was put in jeopardy when Liz was able to win the Battle of the Block all by herself, securing immunity for the week for herself and James and all but ensuring Julia's entry into the game after the upcoming eviction.
561	16	"Episode 16"	Days 37–40	July 29, 2015
Though the initial plan to backdoor Austin was foiled after James and Liz won the Battle of the Block, Vanessa assured the now-dethroned Jackie that she was still committed to backdooring Austin. Austin's attraction to Liz developed; though she enjoyed her time with him, she privately admitted that she didn't return his affections, though he was unaware and kissed her anyway. Shelli, Liz, and John were drawn to join Vanessa, Becky, and Clay in the Power of Veto competition.: Power of Veto ("Get Nutty"): The competitors rolled a plastic acorn back and forth on a ramp; the first competitor to roll it 250 times in a row without dropping it won the Power of Veto.; Clay won the Power of Veto, setting the plan to backdoor Austin in motion. Vanessa first told Liz about it and then decided to confront Austin about what he had said to Jason. When Austin relayed his heated conversation with Vanessa to Clay and Shelli, they realized that they needed to keep him in the game as, despite his volatility, he was loyal to them. Clay and Shelli attempted to convince Vanessa to change the plan, and Vanessa proposed getting rid of Jason, the smartest player outside of the Sixth Sense. At the Veto Meeting, Clay used the Power of Veto on himself, and Vanessa nominated Jason in his place.
562	17	"Episode 17"	Days 40–43	July 30, 2015
After Jason's nomination, the members of Dark Moon not in the Sixth Sense—Becky, Jackie, James, Jason, and Meg—felt betrayed by Vanessa and discussed it with Clay and Shelli. Though Clay and Shelli remained adamant about not knowing about Jason's nomination, Jason realized that they had known, and their refusal to own up to it worried Vanessa, who had to shoulder the entire blame for the plan. The alliance of Jackie, James, Jason, and Meg campaigned for Jason's safety, but it wasn't enough as he became the fifth HouseGuest to be evicted from the house after only James and Meg voted to keep him. Having survived five evictions, Liz and Julia earned the right to compete as individuals, and Julia officially entered the game as a HouseGuest. Julie Chen then announced that the Battle of the Block twist was officially finished.: Head of Household ("On the Edge"): The HouseGuests stood on a perch against a movable wall; the last HouseGuest remaining became the first solo Head of Household.
Week 6
563	18	"Episode 18"	Days 43–44	August 2, 2015
After close to two hours, only James, John, and Shelli remained in the competition. Shelli, not wanting to be Head of Household for a third time, proposed a deal to John and James for her and Clay's safety for the week. James agreed to keep them and John safe, and John and Shelli dropped off to make James the sole Head of Household, taking the Sixth Sense out of power for the first time since Week 1. Now in the house together, Julia and Liz discussed Austin telling Jason that he would target Julia; though Liz believed that Austin was trustworthy and that Jason had been lying, Julia was firmly against Austin. Finally in control, Jackie, James, and Meg decided to target Clay and Shelli for betraying them the previous week and debated putting them both up directly or backdooring Shelli. They discussed it with Becky who, unbeknownst to them, relayed James's plan back to Clay and Shelli. Clay and Shelli tried to convince James to honor their deal and target Austin instead. Vanessa, knowing full well that she was responsible for sending two of James's closest allies home in Jeff and Jason in Week 3 and Week 5, respectively, offered James and one other person of his choice safety until the final seven, provided he didn't nominate her. James took Vanessa up on her deal and avenged Jason's blindside by nominating Clay and Shelli, breaking his deal with them that he had made earlier. Shelli called James out for betraying them and continued to claim that they had nothing to do with Jason's nomination, which further alienated Vanessa.
564	19	"Episode 19"	Days 44–47	August 5, 2015
Clay and Shelli lamented being on the block with each other. Clay yelled at James for breaking their deal and told Shelli that he was ready to sacrifice himself to keep her, the bigger threat to win, in the game. Vanessa, upset that Clay and Shelli were refusing to own up to their roles in Jason's nomination, broke down, and James told her that it was that refusal that caused him to target them for eviction and not Vanessa. When picking players for the Power of Veto competition, Jackie, Vanessa, and Becky were chosen to compete.: Power of Veto ("Game of Throws"): In each round, the competitors launched a dart onto a board that was divided into sections with assigned point values. The player who scored the fewest points in each round was eliminated. Upon elimination, each HouseGuest uncovered a prize that could be good or bad; they could then choose to keep their prize or trade it for another eliminated HouseGuest's prize. After all five rounds, the HouseGuest holding the Veto medallion won the Power of Veto.; Shelli initially won the Veto, but after the fifth round, James took the Veto for himself. Jackie had to wear a unitard shaped like a suit of armor, and Vanessa was forced to shine Jackie's armor for 24 hours. Clay won a trip to Ireland, and Becky won $5,000. Shelli had to perform a regimen with a sword 2,400 times in 24 hours; if she failed, then she would be ineligible to compete in the next Veto competition. After completing her punishment, Shelli attempted to get James to use the Power of Veto on her and to nominate Austin for being deceptive, but James chose not to use it, ensuring that Clay and Shelli would be separated.
565	20	"Episode 20"	Days 47–50	August 6, 2015
Having had romantic feelings for each other since Day 1, Clay and Shelli vowed to not campaign against each other. James and his alliance targeted Shelli, but Vanessa campaigned to keep her. James told Austin that Clay and Shelli had campaigned against him but didn't reveal what they had told him. Vanessa, knowing the Sixth Sense was crumbling, affirmed with Austin, Shelli, and the twins that they needed to stay together. Knowing that their time together was running out, Clay and Shelli finally kissed. When discussing whom to eliminate, Vanessa campaigned hard for Shelli, alarming James and Jackie as to Vanessa's true motives. During the live eviction, Clay asked the voters to evict him; they respected his wish, and he became the sixth HouseGuest to be evicted from the house and the first to be evicted by a unanimous vote. After Clay's eviction, Julie informed the HouseGuests that the next nine evicted HouseGuests would make up the game-deciding Jury and that they may not be out of the game upon eviction.: Head of Household ("Midway Mayhem"): The HouseGuests skated down an icy path while transporting liquid in a funnel to a container, which contained three labeled balls: Head of Household, $5,000, and a Never-Not Pass, which would exempt the winner from being a Have-Not for the remainder of the game. The first HouseGuest to retrieve each ball would receive the corresponding prize. Any HouseGuest could retrieve all three of their balls, but the game would end when a Head of Household ball was retrieved.
Week 7
566	21	"Episode 21"	Days 50–51	August 9, 2015
Hours before Clay's eviction, John told Clay that he would rather him stay than Shelli, as he was afraid that Vanessa would target him and recruit Shelli. Clay, in an attempt to patch things up, told Vanessa that James told John that Vanessa was targeting him, which resulted in a confrontation between Clay and James in which Clay threatened violence. Vanessa then publicly discussed the situation with Clay; though John admitted that James had nothing to do with it and it was all his thoughts, Vanessa didn't believe him. Clay, John and Shelli compared notes and realized that it was a whole misunderstanding. They realized that Vanessa's emotional outbursts were routinely used to send her targets home, and pledged to retaliate so that it wouldn't happen to them next. Becky had such a large lead in the HoH competition that she was able to win all three prizes. Though Becky had worked with both James' alliance and the Sixth Sense, many were unsure as to who she would target. Becky teamed up with Jackie, James and Meg to nominate Shelli and Steve under the guise of targeting Shelli as per the agreement of evicting her and Clay consecutively, but actually backdoor Vanessa, having eavesdropped on the confrontations between Clay, James and Vanessa earlier that day. Becky told Shelli about her plan and told her to act as if she didn't know to stop Vanessa from thinking something was up, though Vanessa became suspicious after Becky told her that John was the backdoor target and then refused to make a deal. At the nomination ceremony, Becky followed through with nominating Shelli and Steve, with Vanessa as the backdoor target.
567	22	"Episode 22"	Days 51–54	August 12, 2015
Vanessa, afraid of being backdoored by Becky, asked both Shelli and Steve to choose her to play in the Veto competition if given the choice so that Vanessa could take one of them off the block and remain immune from being the replacement nominee. John later told Shelli to pick him to play, but she was hesitant about clueing Vanessa into the plan. John told Steve about the plan to backdoor Vanessa and also asked him to pick him for the Veto competition as well, but John said he wouldn't use the Veto to save him, only to save Shelli and ensure Vanessa's nomination, as he believed that no one would ever vote to evict Steve. Liz began developing romantic feelings for Austin, much to Julia's disapproval. When picking players for the Veto competition, Austin, Meg and Vanessa were chosen to compete. Shelli picked the "HouseGuest's Choice" chip and chose Vanessa, upsetting John, Becky and Steve.: Power of Veto ("BB Comics"): The competitors ziplined past a display of 17 comic books designed after the HouseGuests. One at a time, they had to replicate the display in order, but were given two copies of each cover with minor differences between them. The competitor to correctly assemble the display in the fastest time won the Power of Veto.; Steve won the competition. A paranoid Vanessa interrogated James about Becky's plans and he told her to talk to Becky about it; during the conversation, Becky assured Vanessa that she wasn't going up. At the Veto ceremony, after Steve used the Veto on himself, Becky revealed her deception and nominated Vanessa in his place.
568	23	"Episode 23"	Days 54–57	August 13, 2015
A blindsided Vanessa attempted to confront Becky, but she refused to discuss it. Vanessa campaigned for votes; while she thought she could count on Steve's vote, he was hesitant and she felt betrayed. Vanessa told James that Becky was the one who fed information from his alliance to Shelli and Clay. Jackie, James and Meg realized that Shelli would be targeting James for sending Clay home, but Vanessa would go after Becky. James' alliance decided to betray Becky and vote against Shelli; Shelli became the seventh HouseGuest evicted from the house, the second unanimously, becoming the first Jury member in the process, blindsiding Becky and her allies. The HouseGuests were told that the night would be a double eviction, with a week's worth of competitions occurring that night, culminating in a second eviction.: Head of Household ("Getting Loopy"): The night before the challenge, HouseGuests were shown looping video clips of 16 events from earlier that summer. The HouseGuests were given true or false statements based on the clips; incorrect HouseGuests were eliminated and the last one remaining became the new Head of Household.; Steve won the competition; minutes later, he nominated Jackie and Meg for eviction. When picking players for the upcoming Veto competition, Vanessa, John, and James were selected by random draw to join them.: Power of Veto ("Slippery Slope"): The six competitors rolled balls down a platform with three holes. The first HouseGuest to get a ball in each of the three holes in order won the Veto; competitors were eliminated if they sunk balls out of order.; John won the Veto for a third time and chose not to use it, putting the plan to backdoor Becky in jeopardy and Jackie became the eighth HouseGuest evicted from the house after everyone except Becky voted against her, becoming the second Jury member, after which she stated in an interview with Julie that Steve nominated her after a rumor was spread that she was going to backdoor him, though her actual backdoor target was Austin.
Week 8
569	24	"Episode 24"	Days 57–58	August 16, 2015
During the Double Eviction, Steve's plan was to backdoor Becky, but John's third Veto victory foiled his plan.: Head of Household ("Mixed Emojis"): HouseGuests competed in a tournament-style bracket. In each round, HouseGuests were asked a question. They then had to find the correct emoji that answered the question. The first HouseGuest to hit the correct button moved on and eliminated their opponent. An incorrect answer resulted in their own elimination. The last HouseGuest standing became the new Head of Household.; Liz became the new Head of Household and put her alliance back in power for the first time since Week 5. Liz debated either targeting Becky or Vanessa. However, at the nomination ceremony, Liz nominated Becky and John, with Becky as the target and Vanessa as a backdoor option.
570	25	"Episode 25"	Days 58–61	August 19, 2015
After nominations, Becky told Austin and the twins that Vanessa was in on the plan to backdoor Austin in Week 5 in an attempt to convince Liz to consider backdooring Vanessa. When picking players for the veto competition, Meg, Steve and Austin were selected to join Liz, John and Becky.: Power of Veto ("OTEV the Rockin' Roll"): HouseGuests played musical-chairs style. In each round, they were required to bring a butter with the HouseGuest's name that answered OTEV's riddle. The last HouseGuest to bring back the correct answer would be eliminated. The last HouseGuest remaining will win the Power of Veto.; Liz defeated Austin in the final round to win the Power of Veto. Both Becky and John campaigned hard to Liz to use the Power of Veto and backdoor Vanessa. Even though Liz deeply considered putting Vanessa up, at the Veto Meeting, she decided not to use it, keeping her nominations intact.
571	26	"Episode 26"	Days 61–64	August 20, 2015
Becky campaigned hard for votes to the HouseGuests. However, at the live eviction, Austin and the twins decided it was not the right time, and Vanessa also chose not to keep Becky and Becky was unanimously evicted from the house, becoming the third Jury member. Becky told Julie that should she return, she would work with Vanessa and go after Austin and the twins.: Head of Household ("Ready, Set, Whoa"): HouseGuests stood at the end of their own lane and held down three buttons with their hands and one foot. In each round, they had to hold down their buttons until the screens at the end of the lane went through the words "ready," "set" and "go." If any HouseGuest released a button before the word "go," they were eliminated. The last HouseGuest to hit their button in each round was also eliminated. The last HouseGuest standing will be the new Head of Household.; At the end of the live show, the first round was played, in which Meg was eliminated.
Week 9
572	27	"Episode 27"	Days 64–65	August 23, 2015
Before Becky's eviction, Vanessa considered keeping Becky due to them both being big threats. Austin and the twins also thought about keeping Becky and using her to go after Vanessa. In the Head of Household competition, even though he considered throwing it, Austin beat James in the final round to become the new Head of Household. Austin was furious to be the new Head of Household due to having multiple deals with everyone in the game. At the nomination ceremony, he gave a confusing speech and nominated John and Steve, with Vanessa again as a backdoor option.
573	28	"Episode 28"	Days 65–68	August 26, 2015
After talking with John and finding out about more of Vanessa's lies, Austin agreed to backdoor Vanessa. However, his plans were at risk after Julia, Meg and Vanessa were chosen to compete. Zingbot arrived to heckle the HouseGuests and host the upcoming Veto competition.: Power of Veto ("Newly Zingle"): HouseGuests competed one at a time. Competitors looked at six of Zingbot's potential lovers on the new "Zinder" app. For each face, HouseGuests had to identify which three HouseGuests composed the face. The HouseGuest who identifies all six faces in the fastest amount of time will win the Power of Veto.; Vanessa finished in the fastest time and won the Power of Veto, foiling Austin's plan of backdooring her. Steve told Vanessa he was very excited about her Veto win. However, Vanessa knew he was fine with Austin's plan to backdoor her, so at the Veto meeting, Vanessa called Steve out on his bluff and decided to not use the Power of Veto, keeping Austin's nominations intact.
574	29	"Episode 29"	Days 68–71	August 27, 2015
All of the HouseGuests were unsure of whom to evict. John hoped to gain James, Meg and Vanessa's votes. However, Vanessa told John she would be voting with the twins, which caused John to work for Liz and Julia's votes instead. Ultimately, John's campaigning was unsuccessful and he became the tenth HouseGuest evicted from the house, becoming the fourth Jury member. Shortly after, John, along with Shelli, Jackie and Becky, re-entered the House to join the rest of the HouseGuests to have a chance to re-enter the game and possibly become the new Head of Household.: Head of Household/Battle to Return ("Dizzyland"): The eligible HouseGuests and jurors each stood on a small disc suspended by a hanging rope. As the competition continued, they were spun into hand-shaped punching bags, which caused them to spin more. The last juror standing on their rope re-entered the game, while the last HouseGuest remaining overall became the new Head of Household.; Julia, Steve and Meg quickly fell off before the conclusion of the live show.
Week 10
575	30	"Episode 30"	Days 71–72	August 30, 2015
John, Shelli and Vanessa were the last competitors remaining. After Shelli fell off, John became a HouseGuest again; Vanessa attempted to make a deal with him, but he declined. Moments later, he fell, making Vanessa the HoH for a third time. Vanessa, with conflicting deals with everyone, knew she had to break a promise at the upcoming nomination ceremony. Hoping to gain information from Meg and James to give her reason to nominate Austin and the twins and not them, she asked them why she should keep them safe and got no information, so at the nomination ceremony, Vanessa nominated Meg and James, with James as the target.
576	31	"Episode 31"	Days 72–75	September 2, 2015
Now furious with Vanessa for going back on the deal she made in Week 6, James tried to broker a deal with her to keep himself and Meg safe, but all his plan did was irritate Vanessa and make him a bigger target than he already was. When picking players for the Power of Veto competition, Austin, Julia and Liz were selected, with John and Steve as co-hosts of the competition.: Power of Veto ("Hide and Go Veto"): Individually, HouseGuests entered the House to hide a locked Veto box with their name inside. After everyone hid their boxes, HouseGuests had two minutes to individually search the House for a Veto box. The competition continued until five Veto boxes had been found. The HouseGuest who hides their Veto box the best will win the Power of Veto.; James hid his Veto box under the living room rug and won the Power of Veto. Now desperately needing a replacement nominee and not wanting to break her secret alliance with John and Steve, Vanessa asked Julia if she would be fine with going up in James' place as a pawn to ensure Meg's eviction and weaken James. Austin and the twins urged Vanessa to nominate and evict John, unaware of her secret alliance with him. At the Veto Meeting, James used the Veto on himself and Vanessa nominated Julia in his place.
577	32	"Episode 32"	Days 75–78	September 3, 2015
James and Meg attempted to rally Steve and John onto their side to vote Julia out, unaware that they were secretly working with Vanessa. Steve and John became conflicted, recognizing the valuable opportunity to break up Austin and the twins, but at the time, also wanting to appease Vanessa. At the live eviction ceremony, Steve and John ultimately decided to keep Julia and Meg was evicted by a vote of 4–1, with James voting to evict Julia.: Head of Household ("BB Road Trip"): The HouseGuests were presented with two images depicting the six pre-jury members on a tour around the world. They were then asked questions about the shown images and had to respond with either 'True' or 'False.' If an incorrect answer is given, that HouseGuest is eliminated from the competition. The last HouseGuest remaining is the new Head of Household.; The final round came down to the twins, with Liz outlasting Julia and becoming a two-time HoH. Immediately after, Liz nominated James and John for eviction, citing that she had previous loyalties in the house to others. In the random draw for veto players, Vanessa was the only HouseGuest not chosen to compete.: Power of Veto ("Boomerang"): The HouseGuests rolled two balls onto a boomerang-shaped block, with slots on the other side of the block that are designated with specific point values. The HouseGuest whose balls roll into slots that produce the greatest sum is awarded the Power of Veto.; Julia won the Power of Veto and chose not to use it, keeping her sister's nominations intact. At the live second eviction ceremony, James was evicted by a unanimous 4–0 vote, becoming the 5th member of the Jury.
Week 11
578	33	"Episode 33"	Days 78–79	September 6, 2015
After realizing only the two power trios remained, Steve and Vanessa agreed to side completely with John and go after Austin and the twins. In order to do so, it was imperative for one of them to win the upcoming Head of Household competition.: Head of Household ("Starting Lineup"): In each round, HouseGuests were shown a rapid series of 16 baseball cards depicting the HouseGuests. Once they figured out which HouseGuest was excluded from the lineup, they had to take their puzzle pieces, build their face, and hit their button. The last HouseGuest to assemble their puzzle in each round was eliminated. The last HouseGuest standing will be the new Head of Household with a guaranteed spot in the final five.; Steve defeated John in the final round to become a two-time HoH after John threw the competition. Now in power, John, Steve and Vanessa debated about which Austwin to leave off of the block to ensure all three of them would be safe. They also needed to decide which Austwin would be easiest to beat in the final four to ensure they make the final three. Ultimately, they decided to leave Julia off the block and at the nomination ceremony, Steve nominated Austin and Liz, with Austin as the target and Julia as a backdoor option.
579	34	"Episode 34"	Days 79–82	September 9, 2015
With only six HouseGuests remaining, John, Steve and Vanessa needed to prevent Julia from winning the Power of Veto to keep their final three deal intact, while Austin and the twins knew in order to save them, Julia needed to win the Power of Veto to keep all three of them safe and force Steve to put up either John or Vanessa in Liz's place. Jessie Godderz, from seasons 10 and 11, surprised the HouseGuests to host the Power of Veto competition.: Power of Veto ("Bowlerina"): Jessie drew names out of a box to determine the order. In each round, two HouseGuests went head-to-head. HouseGuests had to hold onto a handle above their heads and spin 30 times to lower the gate at the end of their bowling lane for 30 seconds. This gave the HouseGuests the opportunity to bowl down their pins. The first HouseGuest to knock down their four pins in each round moved on and eliminated their opponent. The last HouseGuest standing will win the Power of Veto.; During the competition, Vanessa manipulated Julia to compete against Austin to ensure Julia would not win the Power of Veto. It worked, as Austin eventually beat John in the final round to win the Power of Veto. At the Veto Meeting, Austin used the Veto on himself and Steve nominated Julia in his place.
580	35	"Episode 35"	Days 82–85	September 10, 2015
Knowing that they would be split up, just like Clay and Shelli in Week 6, Liz and Julia spent their final moments together. The twins asked for Julia to be evicted, knowing that Liz would fare better in future competitions. However, John and Vanessa considered evicting Liz due to her being the tie between Austin and Julia, and due to the fact that she is better in competitions. However, at the live eviction, John and Vanessa honored the twins' wishes and Julia was evicted from the house by a 3–0 vote.: Head of Household ("Under the Rainbow"): Each HouseGuest has their own lane with a curved section of chicken wire. HouseGuests must maneuver their eggs on top of the chicken wire and over the rainbow into ten slots. The HouseGuests also had a slot off to the side for a prize. The first HouseGuest to place an egg in the special slot will win a trip outside of the House and the first HouseGuest to place ten eggs in their slots at the end of the rainbow will be the new Head of Household, guaranteeing them a spot in the final four.; At the end of the live show, Austin had his first egg in his slots, while the other HouseGuests were struggling to get their first egg in their slots.
Week 12
581	36	"Episode 36"	Days 85–86	September 13, 2015
Vanessa narrowly defeated Austin and John to become a four-time HoH. Liz won the trip outside the house and was able to take another houseguest with her; she chose Vanessa and the two went to an Ariana Grande concert with her brother, season 16 alumnus Frankie Grande. Again, with conflicting deals with everyone, Vanessa knew she had to break a promise at the upcoming nomination ceremony. Hoping to gain information from Steve to give her reason to put Austin and Liz back on the block, Vanessa asked him why she should keep him and got no information, so at the nomination ceremony, she nominated John and Steve, with John as the target.
582	37	"Episode 37"	Days 86–89	September 15, 2015
Vanessa decided to work both sides of the house, this time with Austin and Liz, to win the Veto and ensure John's re-eviction. John knew that he needed to win the Power of Veto in order to further his life in the game.: Power of Veto ("Life in Pieces"): HouseGuests competed in a puzzle competition sponsored by CBS' new sitcom, Life in Pieces. Each HouseGuest had their own lane with a balance beam, a timer with a button, and a magnetic puzzle board. HouseGuests had to hit their button to magnetize their puzzle board for twenty seconds. They then had to walk across the beam to start working on their puzzle. Running out of time or falling off of the beam resulted in the puzzle board being demagnetized, forcing them to start their puzzle from scratch. After a board demagnetizes, that HouseGuest only has ten seconds to remagnetize their board or they will be eliminated from the competition. The first HouseGuest to complete their puzzle and hit their button will win the Power of Veto.; Vanessa was quickly eliminated after her board demagnetized and her time ran out. John had a strategy to build his puzzle in his tray instead of on the board, allowing him to walk on the grass as he pleased, then once he had his pieces situated, he could place them on the board correctly. His strategy proved effective and John won the Power of Veto for the fourth time. At the Veto Meeting, John used the Veto on himself and Vanessa nominated Austin in his place. At the live eviction ceremony, after John cast his vote to evict Austin and Liz cast hers to evict Steve, Vanessa cast the tie-breaking vote to send Austin to the jury and he became the fourteenth HouseGuest evicted from the house, becoming the seventh jury member.: Head of Household ("What the Bleep?!"): HouseGuests were shown a clip with a censored word(s). Julie then gave them a word that the censored word(s) could be. HouseGuests then had to decide if Julie's statement was true or false. The HouseGuest with the most points after seven clips will be the new Head of Household with a guaranteed place in the final three.; After a tie-breaker question between John and Steve, Steve won his third Head of Household of the season.
583	38	"Episode 38"	Days 89–91	September 16, 2015
With the final veto competition looming, John, Steve, and Vanessa hoped to win the Power of Veto to send Liz to the jury. At the final nomination ceremony of the summer, Steve nominated John and Vanessa for eviction. Caleb Reynolds from last season entered the House to host the final Veto competition of the summer.: Power of Veto ("Martial Smarts"): In each round, Caleb asked the HouseGuests on what day a certain event occurred. The HouseGuests then had to hit their karate partner, either a hand punch for one day, or a shin kick for 5 days, to display the correct day on their counter. If a HouseGuest buzzed in with an incorrect answer, their counter would drop to zero and would have to try again. The last HouseGuest to answer correctly in each round got one strike against them. Two strikes resulted in elimination from the competition. The last HouseGuest standing will win the final Power of Veto of the summer.; The competition came down to Vanessa and John, both with both strikes remaining. Vanessa won the last two rounds to win the Power of Veto. Liz campaigned to Vanessa, stating if she kept her, she would take her to the final two. At the Veto Meeting, Vanessa used the Power of Veto to save herself, with Liz going up in her stead. Vanessa then cast her vote to evict John, and he became the eighth member of the Jury. This episode also saw another first in Big Brother history: On a sit-down interview with host Julie Chen, married couple Rachel Reilly and Brendon Villegas (from seasons 12 and 13; Rachel being the winner of season 13) announced that they were expecting their first child together; they would give birth to a daughter, Adora Borealis, the following year on April 8.
Week 13
584	39	"Episode 39"	Days 91–94	September 20, 2015
Liz, Steve, and Vanessa reminisced about the summer's events.: Final Head of Household, Part 1 ("How 'Bout Them Apples?"): HouseGuests sat on an apple-shaped ball and were dunked in chocolate; the last competitor remaining advanced to the third part of the competition, to face off against the winner of Part 2.
585	40	"Episode 40"	Days 91–98	September 23, 2015
Steve fell 3 hours and 35 minutes into the competition. Liz dropped after Vanessa convinced her that she'd be more likely to beat Steve in Part 2, and Vanessa won Part 1 of the Final Head of Household competition. Steve and Liz then had to face off in Part 2 of the Final Head of Household competition.: Final Head of Household, Part 2 ("Colossal Crossword"): HouseGuests competed individually. Each HouseGuest had a giant crossword puzzle with several clues. They had to scale the wall and collect the letters to spell the correct answer to each clue and place them in the crossword. The HouseGuest who completes the crossword and hits their button faster will face Vanessa in Part 3 of the Final Head of Household competition on Finale Night.; Steve completed his puzzle faster than Liz, and advanced to face Vanessa in Part 3.: Final Head of Household, Part 3 ("Scales of Just-Us"): Vanessa and Steve were asked questions based on how the members of the jury completed various statements. A correct answer resulted in receiving one point. The HouseGuest with the most points after 8 questions will become the final Head of Household of the summer.; Steve defeated Vanessa and became the final Head of Household, guaranteeing himself a spot in the final two. He then immediately cast the sole vote to evict Vanessa after praising her strategic game. After the jury questioned the final two, they locked in their votes. Steve won the game after receiving Shelli, Jackie, Becky, Meg, James, and John's votes to win, and Liz became the runner-up with Vanessa, Austin, and Julia's votes. John, James, and Jason were the top three vote-getters for America's Favorite HouseGuest; James won.

== Voting history ==
Color key:

Winner
Runner-up
Head of Household
Nominated for eviction
Immune from eviction
Won Immunity via competition
Not eligible to vote
Evicted
Entered/Re-entered the game

Voting history (season 17)
	Week 1	Week 2	Week 3	Week 4	Week 5	Week 6	Week 7		Week 8	Week 9	Week 10		Week 11	Week 12		Week 13	
	Week 1	Week 2	Week 3	Week 4	Week 5	Week 6	Day 50	Day 57 (Note: This week was a double eviction week. Following the first eviction, the remaining HouseGuests played a week's worth of games, including Head of Household and veto competitions, and nomination, veto and eviction ceremonies, during the live show, culminating in a second eviction for the week.)	Week 8	Week 9	Day 71	Day 78	Week 11	Day 85	Day 89	Day 98	Finale
Head(s) of Household	James; ~~Jason~~ (Note: This Head of Household was dethroned after their nominees won the Battle of the Block competition.)	~~Becky~~; Shelli	~~Austin~~; Vanessa	~~Liz~~; Shelli	~~Jackie~~; Vanessa	James	Becky	Steve	Liz	Austin	Vanessa	Liz	Steve	Vanessa	Steve	Steve	(None)
Battle of the Block winners	Becky; John	Jason; Steve	Jason; Meg	Jackie; James	James; Liz	(None)										(None)	(None)
Nominations (pre-veto)	Jackie; Steve	Da'Vonne; John	James; John	Jason; John	Becky; Clay	Clay; Shelli	Shelli; Steve	Jackie; Meg	Becky; John	John; Steve	James; Meg	James; John	Austin; Liz	John; Steve	John; Vanessa	(None)	(None)
Veto winner	Steve	John	John	Vanessa	Clay	James	Steve	John	Liz	Vanessa	James	Julia	Austin	John	Vanessa	(None)	(None)
Nominations (post-veto)	Jace; Jackie	Da'Vonne; Meg	James; Jeff	Audrey; John	Becky; Jason	Clay; Shelli	Shelli; Vanessa	Jackie; Meg	Becky; John	John; Steve	Julia; Meg	James; John	Julia; Liz	Austin; Steve	John; Liz	Liz; Vanessa	(None)
Steve	Jace	Da'Vonne (Note: This player received immunity for winning the Battle of the Block competition.)	James	Audrey	Jason	Clay	Shelli	Head of Household	Becky	Nominated	Meg	James	Head of Household	Nominated	Head of Household	Vanessa (Note: As Head of Household, Steve chose to evict Vanessa.)	Winner
Liz	Jace (Note: For volunteering to sit out the week 1 Head of Household competition, Da'Vonne and Vanessa were awarded the BB Fast Forward; they were both immune from nomination for the week and were each instructed to share the Fast Forward with another HouseGuest; they chose Liz and Austin.)	Da'Vonne	James	Audrey	Jason	Clay	Shelli	Jackie	Head of Household	John	Meg	Head of Household	Nominated	Steve	Nominated	Nominated	Runner-up
Vanessa	Jace	Da'Vonne	Head of Household	Audrey	Head of Household	Clay	Nominated	Jackie	Becky	John	Head of Household	James	Julia	Austin (Note: As the vote was tied, the Head of Household cast the tie-breaker vote.)	John	Evicted (Day 98)	Liz
John	Jace	Da'Vonne	James	Nominated	Jason	Clay	Shelli	Jackie	Nominated	Nominated	Meg	Nominated	Julia	Austin	Nominated	Re-evicted (Day 91)	Steve
Austin	Jace	Da'Vonne	Jeff	John	Jason	Clay	Shelli	Jackie	Becky	Head of Household	Meg	James	Julia	Nominated	Evicted (Day 89)		Liz
Julia	Non-HouseGuest (Note: Identical twins Liz and Julia took turns playing as a single HouseGuest during the first five weeks, secretly trading places every few days between living inside the house and being in sequester outside the house. Both twins pretended to be Liz until they completed this task. Following the fifth eviction, Julia was allowed to enter the house on her own since Liz was still in the game.)					Clay	Shelli	Jackie	Becky	John	Nominated	James	Nominated	Evicted (Day 85)			Liz
James	Head of Household	Da'Vonne	Nominated	Audrey	Becky	Head of Household	Shelli	Jackie	Becky	John	Julia	Nominated	Evicted (Day 78)				Steve
Meg	Jace	Nominated	Jeff	Audrey	Becky	Clay	Shelli	Nominated	Becky	John	Nominated	Evicted (Day 78)					Steve
Becky	Jace	Not eligible (Note: Da'Vonne was able to block three HouseGuests from voting in this week's eviction; she chose Becky, Jackie, and Jeff.)	Jeff	Audrey	Nominated	Clay	Head of Household	Meg	Nominated	Evicted (Day 64)							Steve
Jackie	Nominated	Not eligible	James	Audrey	Jason	Clay	Shelli	Nominated	Evicted (Day 57)								Steve
Shelli	Jace	Head of Household	Jeff	Head of Household	Jason	Nominated	Nominated	Evicted (Day 57)									Steve
Clay	Jace	Da'Vonne	Jeff	Audrey	Jason	Nominated	Evicted (Day 50)										
Jason	Jace	Meg	Jeff	Audrey	Nominated	Evicted (Day 43)											
Audrey	Jackie	Meg	Jeff	Nominated	Evicted (Day 36)												
Jeff	Jace	Not eligible	Nominated	Evicted (Day 29)													
Da'Vonne	Jace	Nominated	Evicted (Day 22)														
Jace	Nominated	Evicted (Day 15)															
Evicted	Jace; 12 of 13 votes to evict	Da'Vonne; 7 of 9 votes to evict	Jeff; 7 of 11 votes to evict	Audrey; 10 of 11 votes to evict (Note: Audrey was given a penalty vote after eating normal food while on the mandatory have-not diet.)	Jason; 7 of 9 votes to evict	Julia; Won entry into game (Note: After successfully surviving five evictions, Julia won entry into the game as an individual player.)	Shelli; 8 of 8 votes to evict	Jackie; 6 of 7 votes to evict	Becky; 6 of 6 votes to evict	John; 5 of 5 votes to evict	John; Won re-entry into game (Note: Shelli, Jackie, Becky, and John competed for a chance to re-enter the game. John won the competition and re-entered the house.)	James; 4 of 4 votes to evict	Julia; 3 of 3 votes to evict	Austin; 2 of 3 votes to evict	John; Vanessa's choice to evict	Vanessa; Steve's choice to evict	Steve; 6 votes to win
Evicted	Jace; 12 of 13 votes to evict	Da'Vonne; 7 of 9 votes to evict	Jeff; 7 of 11 votes to evict	Audrey; 10 of 11 votes to evict	Jason; 7 of 9 votes to evict	Clay; 9 of 9 votes to evict	Shelli; 8 of 8 votes to evict	Jackie; 6 of 7 votes to evict	Becky; 6 of 6 votes to evict	John; 5 of 5 votes to evict	Meg; 4 of 5 votes to evict	James; 4 of 4 votes to evict	Julia; 3 of 3 votes to evict	Austin; 2 of 3 votes to evict	John; Vanessa's choice to evict	Vanessa; Steve's choice to evict	Liz; 3 votes to win

== Production ==
On September 24, 2014, CBS announced that it had renewed Big Brother for its seventeenth and eighteenth editions for broadcast in summer 2015 and 2016, respectively. The series would continue to be hosted by Julie Chen.

On June 15, 2015, CBS released pictures of the house via Entertainment Tonight, which has a modern steel beach house theme. The upstairs is 155 square feet larger than in previous seasons, the result of the incorporation of a glass bridge added in by Big Brother house designer Scott Storey. Season 17 is the first season for which the live feeds were bundled with CBS All Access, an over-the-top streaming service launched by CBS in January 2015 that allows users to view past and present episodes of CBS shows, and includes the live feeds and special Big Brother content.

While the aired episodes had transitioned to HD the previous season, BB17 was the first season in which the live internet feeds were broadcast in HD.

== Reception ==
=== Viewing figures ===
#	Air Date	United States				Source
#	Air Date	18–49 (rating/share)	Viewers (millions)	Rank (timeslot)	Rank (night)	Source
1	Wednesday, June 24, 2015	2.1/8	6.92	1	1	
2	Thursday, June 25, 2015	2.1/8	6.42	1	1	
3^{1}	Sunday, June 28, 2015	1.8/6	5.99	2	2	
4	Wednesday, July 1, 2015	1.9/7	5.87	1	1	
5	Thursday, July 2, 2015	1.8/7	5.92	1	1	
6	Sunday, July 5, 2015	1.7/6	4.98	1	3	
7	Wednesday, July 8, 2015	2.0/7	5.88	1	1	
8	Thursday, July 9, 2015	1.9/7	5.87	1	1	
9	Sunday, July 12, 2015	2.0/7	5.85	2	2	
10	Wednesday, July 15, 2015	2.0/8	6.02	2	2	
11	Thursday, July 16, 2015	2.0/7	6.07	1	1	
12	Sunday, July 19, 2015	1.8/7	5.85	2	2	
13	Wednesday, July 22, 2015	1.8/7	5.75	1	1	
14	Thursday, July 23, 2015	1.9/7	5.79	1	1	
15	Sunday, July 26, 2015	1.9/6	5.95	2	2	
16	Wednesday, July 29, 2015	1.8/7	5.74	1	1	
17	Thursday, July 30, 2015	2.1/8	6.38	1	1	
18	Sunday, August 2, 2015	1.9/7	6.26	1	1	
19	Wednesday, August 5, 2015	2.2/9	6.58	1	1	
20	Thursday, August 6, 2015	2.1/9	6.23	1	1	
21	Sunday, August 9, 2015	2.2/7	6.62	2	2	
22	Wednesday, August 12, 2015	2.2/9	6.64	1	1	
23	Thursday, August 13, 2015	1.9/7	6.08	1	1	
24^{2}	Sunday, August 16, 2015	2.1/7	6.89	1	1	
25	Wednesday, August 19, 2015	2.1/8	6.52	1	1	
26	Thursday, August 20, 2015	2.0/7	6.48	1	1	
27	Sunday, August 23, 2015	2.0/8	6.15	1	1	
28	Wednesday, August 26, 2015	2.1/8	6.46	1	1	
29	Thursday, August 27, 2015	2.1/7	6.37	1	1	
30	Sunday, August 30, 2015	2.2/7	6.73	2	2	
31	Wednesday, September 2, 2015	2.1/8	6.58	1	1	
32	Thursday, September 3, 2015	2.0/7	5.79	1	1	
33	Sunday, September 6, 2015	1.7/7	5.43	1	1	
34	Wednesday, September 9, 2015	2.1/8	6.56	1	1	
35	Thursday, September 10, 2015	2.0/7	6.08	1	3	
36^{3}	Sunday, September 13, 2015	2.3/9	7.02	1	1	
37	Tuesday, September 15, 2015	2.0/8	6.09	2	2	
38	Wednesday, September 16, 2015	1.9/7	5.86	1	2	
39^{4}	Sunday, September 20, 2015	1.8/5	6.03	3	6	
40	Wednesday, September 23, 2015	2.2/7	6.54	2	10	

- ^Note 1: Episode 3 was delayed to 8:06 PM ET due to the PGA Tour golf event running long.
- ^Note 2: Episode 24 was delayed to 8:31 PM ET due to the PGA Tour golf event running long.
- ^Note 3: Episode 36 was delayed to 8:30 PM ET due to CBS coverage of NFL Football.
- ^Note 4: Episode 39 was delayed to 8:26 PM ET in some markets due to CBS coverage of NFL Football.
