= Magic triangle =

Magic triangle can refer to:

- Magic Triangle (Dave Douglas album), an album by trumpeter Dave Douglas
- Magic triangle (mathematics), a mathematical concept, also called a perimeter magic triangle
- The Magic Triangle, an album by American jazz pianist Don Pullen
