= Alison Marr =

American mathematician and mathematics educator

Alison M. Marr (born 1980) is an American mathematician and mathematics educator. Her research concerns graph theory and graph labeling, and she is also an advocate of inquiry-based learning in mathematics. She works as a professor of mathematics and computer science at Southwestern University in Texas.

== Education and career ==
Marr graduated from Murray State University in 2002, and earned a master's degree in mathematics at Texas A&M University in 2004. She completed her Ph.D. in 2007 at Southern Illinois University; her dissertation, Labelings of Directed Graphs, was supervised by Walter D. Wallis.

She has been a member of the mathematics faculty at Southwestern University since 2007. She was department chair for 2015–2018. Beyond mathematics, her teaching at Southwestern has included a freshman seminar on television game shows.

== Contributions ==
=== Inquiry-based learning ===
Marr is an advocate of inquiry-based learning in mathematics, a style of teaching through student research rather than through presentation of packaged solutions that is closely related to the Moore method. She was one of the founding officers of the inquiry-based learning special interest group of the Mathematical Association of America, which was established in 2016. She is an editor of the Journal of Inquiry-Based Learning in Mathematics, and serves on the board of directors of the Initiative for Mathematics Learning By Inquiry.

=== Graph theory ===
With Walter Wallis, Marr is the author of a book on magic graphs and graph labeling, Magic Graphs (2nd ed., Springer, 2013). She spoke about magic graph labelings as an invited speaker at the Midwest Conference on Combinatorics, Cryptography, and Computing in 2011.

== Recognition ==
Marr was named as a Fellow of the Association for Women in Mathematics, in the 2027 class of fellows, "for her outstanding leadership in advancing women in mathematics through codirecting the EDGE Program, mentoring undergraduate researchers, and creating innovative courses on women in mathematics".
