= The Challenge: All Stars season 5 =

The Challenge All Stars: Rivals
- Season 5
- Presented by: T. J. Lavin
- No. of contestants: 26
- Winners: Adam Larson; Steve Meinke
- Location: Ho Chi Minh City, Vietnam
- No. of episodes: 12

Release
- Original network: MTV
- Original release: January 29 – April 16, 2025

Season chronology
- ← Previous; Season 4

The fifth season of The Challenge: All Stars, also known as The Challenge All Stars: Rivals, premiered on MTV on January 29, 2025, following the prior four seasons airing exclusively on Paramount+. The season features twenty-six cast members from The Real World, Road Rules, Are You the One?, Big Brother, Ex on the Beach, Survivor, Shipwrecked, and 12 Dates of Christmas competing for a $300,000 prize.

== Format ==
The Challenge All Stars: Rivals features teams made up of partners who have previously had conflict or rivalries with each other. The season features a daily challenge, a nomination process and an elimination round.

- Daily Challenge: Teams compete in a challenge where the winners are immune and receive the power to nominate a team for the elimination round.
- Nominations: Excluding the winners, all teams vote to nominate a team to compete in the elimination round.
- Eliminations (The Jungle): At the Jungle, the winning team selects a team to compete in the elimination round against the team nominated by the house. The winners may also volunteer for the elimination round instead. The winners of the elimination remain in the competition while the defeated team is eliminated.

Twists

- Stars: To be eligible to compete in the Final Challenge, teams must possess a Star. The Stars were initially awarded to the top four teams of the "Frenemies" challenge. Throughout the season, teams without a Star can obtain one by winning an elimination round and stealing the Star from the team they defeated (if their opponent possessed a Star), or from a non-immune Star holder (if their opponent did not possess a Star).
  - Star challenges: If two Star-holding teams compete against each other in the elimination, the next episode's challenge doubles as a "Star challenge" where the newly-eliminated team's Star is awarded to top performing team that does not currently possess a Star.

== Contestants ==
Male contestants	Original season	Finish
Adam Larson	Road Rules: The Quest	Winner
Steve Meinke	Road Rules: The Quest	Winner
Shane Landrum	Road Rules: Campus Crawl	Runner-up
Frank Fox	The Real World: San Diego (2011)	Third place
Turabi "Turbo" Çamkıran	Survivor Turkey 8	Episode 10
Dario Medrano	Are You the One? 2	Episode 8
Faysal Shafaat	Big Brother 20	Episode 7
Corey Lay	12 Dates of Christmas 1	Episode 6
Devin Walker-Molaghan	Are You the One? 3	Episode 5
Leroy Garrett	The Real World: Las Vegas (2011)	Episode 5

Female contestants	Original season	Finish
Da'Vonne Rogers	Big Brother 17	Runner-up
Sam McGinn	The Real World: San Diego (2011)	Third place
Melissa Reeves	Ex on the Beach UK 2	Fourth place
Nicole Zanatta	Real World: Skeletons	Fourth place
Nany Gonzalez	The Real World: Las Vegas (2011)	Episode 10
Katie Cooley	Road Rules: The Quest	Episode 9
Veronica Portillo	Road Rules: Semester at Sea	Episode 9
Ashley Kelsey	The Real World: San Diego (2011)	Episode 8
Amber Borzotra	Big Brother 16	Episode 7
Tula "Big T" Fazakerley	Shipwrecked: Battle of the Islands	Episode 6
Aneesa Ferreira	The Real World: Chicago	Episode 4
Ashley Mitchell	Real World: Ex-Plosion	Episode 4
KellyAnne Judd	The Real World: Sydney	Episode 3
Sylvia Elsrode	Real World: Skeletons	Episode 3
Beth Stolarczyk	The Real World: Los Angeles	Episode 2
Jonna Mannion	The Real World: Cancun	Episode 2

=== Teams ===
Partner 1	Partner 2
Adam Larson	Steve Meinke
Amber Borzotra	Faysal Shafaat
Aneesa Ferreira	Ashley Mitchell
Ashley Kelsey	Dario Medrano
Beth Stolarczyk	Jonna Mannion
Tula "Big T" Fazakerley	Corey Lay
Da'Vonne Rogers	Shane Landrum
Devin Walker-Molaghan	Leroy Garrett
Frank Sweeney	Sam McGinn
Katie Cooley	Veronica Portillo
KellyAnne Judd	Sylvia Elsrode
Melissa Reeves	Nicole Zanatta
Nany Gonzalez	Turabi "Turbo" Çamkıran

=== Pre-season rivalry backgrounds ===
==== Male teams ====
- Adam & Steve: Adam voted for Steve to compete in the first elimination round of The Challenge: All Stars 4. Later in the season, Adam voted Steve in again, and after winning the "Shish Kestack" Arena that he faced because of this vote, Steve opted to steal Adam's Star as a result of this decision.
- Devin & Leroy: After Devin was voted into the elimination round on The Challenge: Double Agents, Leroy selected Devin's ally Wes Bergmann to be his opponent.

==== Female/male teams ====
- Amber & Faysal: Amber and Faysal first clashed in a shaky Big Brother alliance on The Challenge: Double Agents, which culminated in Faysal throwing himself into the season's final elimination round to avoid being partnered with Amber for the Final Challenge; Amber subsequently won the season with her new partner Chris "CT" Tamburello. Faysal then blindsided Amber to go into the elimination round on The Challenge: Spies, Lies & Allies.
- Ashley K. & Dario: The two are exes. They first met on The Challenge: Invasion of the Champions and later started dating. They have not spoken to one another in six years.
- Big T & Corey: The two had a falling out after Corey claimed he was using game information from Big T against her, and she became the main target on The Challenge: Battle for a New Champion. She felt their personal relationship was affected by this cold reveal and did not fully accept his apology at the reunion.
- Da'Vonne & Shane: Da'Vonne and Shane fought on The Challenge: Final Reckoning after Shane threw the "Don't Push Me Around" challenge, thus causing Da'Vonne and her partner Jozea Flores to be voted into the elimination round, which they ultimately lost. This was preceded by an earlier vote where Shane felt Da'Vonne went against her word and during an argument verbally accosted her.
- Frank & Sam: The two former The Real World: San Diego (2011) roommates competed together on The Challenge: Battle of the Seasons, where they ultimately won. Throughout the season, Frank did not consider Sam a worthy teammate and physically shoved her during the Final Challenge.
- Nany & Turbo: On The Challenge: War of the Worlds Turbo picked Nany to be his partner. On The Challenge: Ride or Dies, the two had a falling out and Johnny "Bananas" Devenanzio and Nany ultimately selected Turbo and his partner Tamara Alfaro for the elimination round.

==== Female teams ====
- Aneesa & Ashley M.: Aneesa talked poorly about Ashley at a Challenge-related fan event, and Ashley feels like Aneesa plays a game style that is unsuccessful.
- Beth & Jonna: Entering The Challenge: All Stars 3, Beth did not trust Jonna and implied she was cheating on her husband with MJ Garrett. Jonna was eventually voted in elimination and called out Beth as her opponent. However, Beth withdrew midway through the elimination since Jonna was receiving help from MJ.
- Katie & Veronica: The two were teammates on both Real World/Road Rules Challenge: The Gauntlet and Real World/Road Rules Challenge: The Inferno. On both seasons, Katie was perceived as the Road Rules team's weak link. After being selected for The Inferno twice by the opposing team, Veronica won the Aztec Life Saver and sent Katie in to replace her both times. Katie won both elimination rounds and ultimately was part of the winning team alongside Veronica.
- KellyAnne & Sylvia: On The Challenge: All Stars 3, Sylvia used her first sabotage on KellyAnne. Later in the season, KellyAnne selected Sylvia to go into the elimination which she ultimately lost.
- Melissa & Nicole: They hooked up on The Challenge: Vendettas. They remained friends until Melissa became friends with Nicole's ex, Laurel Stucky.

== Gameplay ==
=== Challenge games ===
- Frenemies: Teams race to complete three checkpoints before crossing the finish line. The first four teams to finish become the initial Star holders of the season.
  - Checkpoint #1 (Mudbath): Teams must use their bodies to transfer mud from a pit to a bucket until they collect enough to reach a marked line.
  - Checkpoint #2 (Ice Transfer): Teams must use long sticks to transfer ice cubes from a cooler into a cylinder of water until the ball inside rises to a marked line.
  - Checkpoint #3 (Ball-ance Gurney): Teams must balance four balls on a gurney and carry it across the finish line, collecting three sandbags along the way.
  - Winners: Adam & Steve, Ashley K. & Dario, Devin & Leroy and Nany & Turbo
- Edge of Glory: Teams must solve a math equation. Afterwards, one team member is harnessed on a ledge of the Bitexco Financial Tower, and leans over the edge to attempt to collect four hanging flags while their teammate secures them with a rope. Teams' harnesses are connected in a way that if one team member falls off the edge, their partner falls with them. Teams are disqualified from the challenge if a team member refuses to participate, or time-out after 10 minutes. The team that completes the challenge the fastest wins.
  - Winners: Amber & Faysal (Note: Due to adverse weather conditions, Devin & Leroy, Melissa & Nicole and Nany & Turbo were given the choice of attempting the "Edge of Glory" challenge the following day to beat current leaders Amber & Faysal, or not to compete at all. All three teams elected not to compete.)
- Ball Buster: Teams must retrieve ten of their assigned balls from a pit and transfer them through an obstacle course. However, teams can only take as many balls as they can carry at once. After depositing all ten balls at the end of the course, teams must solve a puzzle. The first team to solve the puzzle wins.
  - Winners: Devin & Leroy
- Push Over: Teams begin harnessed on a speeding truck. One team member swings their partner from the truck so they can collect rings placed on stands along the road, including three bonus rings. After teams collect a ring, the team member swinging their partner must cross a balance beam and deposit the ring on a pole before continuing. Teams are issued a penalty if they transfer more than one ring across the beam at once. The team that collects the most rings wins. In the event of a tie, the team that collects the most bonus rings wins.
  - Winners: Amber & Faysal
- Sundae Funday: Each team begins with one vanilla milkshake and are asked six questions during the challenge. Each time both teammates fail to give the same answer, teams must add a condiment such as ketchup, vinegar or mayonnaise to their milkshake. Afterwards, the first team to fully drink their milkshake wins.
  - Winners: Frank & Sam
- Playing Dirty: Played in three heats, teams must climb up a ladder and slide down a mud-covered ramp, continuing until all the mud is cleared to reveal a series of symbols. Once complete, teams swim to their station, match the symbols to their corresponding letters on a board and unscramble the letters to form a word. The team with the fastest overall time wins. Additionally, the team with the fastest time out of the non-Star holders receives a Star.
  - Winners: Adam & Steve
- Blow Your Mind: Team members start on opposite sides of a field, each with three puzzle keys in front of them. To begin, team members attempt to memorize the information on their first puzzle key. To proceed to the next puzzle key, one team member must press a detonator, which burns both teammate's current puzzle keys, meaning they can no longer view them. This process continues until all the puzzle keys have been viewed and detonated. Afterwards, teams must use the information they memorized to solve a time zone-based puzzle at the middle of the field. The team that solves the most parts of the puzzle correctly wins.
  - Winners: Katie & Veronica
- Shooting for the Star: While harnessed near the edge of a cliff, teams must solve a puzzle before riding an ATV off the cliff and attempting to hit a star hanging 12 feet away. The team that manages to hit the star in the fastest time wins.
  - Winners: Adam & Steve
- Bubble Bullseye: Played across five rounds. Each round, one team member sits on a tube which their partner slides onto a board to try and land in the 25-point zone at the center, with point values decreasing with each surrounding zone. Teams are penalized 10 points if the team member on the tube touches the ground, or are disqualified from the challenge if they tip over completely. The team that scores the fewest points each round, or stops the furthest away in the event of a tie, is eliminated from the challenge. The team that wins the final round wins. Additionally, the last team standing out of the non-Star holders receives a Star.
  - Winners: Da'Vonne & Shane
- Pressure Sandwich: Teams begin with four cylindrical puzzle pieces which they carry as a "sandwich" for the challenge, and must collect six additional puzzle pieces from stations within the jungle to add to their sandwich. Teams must return to their last station if they drop any puzzle pieces while in transit, before they can continue. After accumulating ten puzzle pieces, teams proceed to their puzzle station and use the pieces to solve a puzzle. The first team to solve the puzzle wins.
  - Winners: Frank & Sam

=== Jungle games ===
- Pole Position: Each team has a tube divided into three sections. For five rounds, teams roll a die, and both teammates must move into the section they rolled to complete the round. However, after every roll, teams must insert poles through the tube (starting with one for the first round and increasing by one each round), making it harder to pass through as the elimination progresses. The first team to complete all five rounds wins.
  - Played by: Adam & Steve vs. Beth & Jonna
- Pile It On: Each team has a giant spool of rope which unravels throughout the elimination. Teams must solve a puzzle then hold up all of their unravelled rope for five minutes. If any rope touches the ground, the time resets. The first team to finish wins.
  - Played by: Adam & Steve vs. KellyAnne & Sylvia
- Downpour: One team member begins as the "offensive" player and tries to fill their team's tank from above using a water hose. Meanwhile, their partner begins as the "defensive" player and uses a shield to try and block water from entering their opponent's tank. Three times during the elimination, at the sound of an airhorn, team members switch roles before the elimination continues. The team with the most water in their tank by the end of the elimination wins.
  - Played by: Adam & Steve vs. Aneesa & Ashley M.
- Over a Barrel: Teams must transfer 18 numbered barrels across the Jungle without touching the ground, with several ropes strung across the Jungle to help them. Each time a team member touches the ground, they must restart that barrel. Afterwards, teams must use the barrels to solve two magic triangle puzzles. The first team to finish wins.
  - Played by: Adam & Steve vs. Devin & Leroy
- Stack Attack: While balancing on a giant spinning top, teams must collect seven hanging stars and stack them at the center of the top. Teams are imposed a 10-second penalty each time a team member or star falls on the ground. The first team to complete their stack wins.
  - Played by: Ashley K. & Dario vs. Big T & Corey
- Scratch Off: Teams must use two coins to scratch the coating off a board to reveal an image on the other side. They must then recreate the image using puzzle pieces at their station. The first team to finish wins.
  - Played by: Amber & Faysal vs. Nany & Turbo
- Hold Up: One team member must hold up a board while their partner collects puzzle pieces around the Jungle and uses them to assemble the puzzle on the board. Every three minutes, team members must switch positions, effectively making them restart the puzzle. The first team to assemble the puzzle wins.
  - Played by: Ashley K. & Dario vs. Nany & Turbo
- Pin Pop: With one member holding each end of a rope, teams must maneuver a large pin attached to the rope and try and pop seven balloons located between them. To pop the balloons, teams must land the pin through a small hole above each balloon. Any balloons popped from the side are not counted. The team that pops the most balloons in the fastest time wins.
  - Played by: Katie & Veronica vs. Melissa & Nicole
- Star Bluff: Each round, teams are assigned either an empty box or a box containing a star. One team may look inside their box to see its contents. Afterwards, the other team is given two minutes to ask about the contents of the boxes, which the responding team may lie about. The team which didn't look inside their box can then choose to keep their own box, or to swap it with their opponent's. The team that ends up with the box containing a star wins each round. After five rounds, teams must use bamboo sticks to transfer yoga balls into a basket at the other end of the Jungle. For each round a team won in the first part of the elimination, one ball is already transferred for them. The first team to transfer all their balls into their basket wins.
  - Played by: Adam & Steve vs. Nany & Turbo

=== Final Challenge ===
For the Final Challenge, teams compete in a series of checkpoints to earn stars (points) based on their placements. The first team to complete each checkpoint receive four stars; second receive three; third receive two; fourth receive one. Teams receive no stars if they time-out for a checkpoint. At the end of the Final Challenge, the team with the most stars are declared the winners of All Stars: Rivals and receive $250,000; second place receives $35,000; third place receives $10,000; fourth place receives $5,000.

Day one

- Checkpoint #1 (Coding Ball): Teams must memorize seven symbols on a board at the bottom of a sand dune, and use them to decode a word at their station at the top of the dune. Each time teams ascend the sand dune, team members must pass a ball back and forth between each other, and teams must return to the bottom of the dune if they drop the ball.
- Checkpoint #2 (#Barrels): Teams must transfer 12 numbered barrels across to the other side of a "hashtag" without touching the ground, with several ropes strung across the area to help them. Each time a team member touches the ground, they must restart that barrel. Afterwards, teams must use the barrels to solve two magic hexagon puzzles.
- Checkpoint #3 (Towered Out): Teams must use a bungee sling to lift and stack 28 baskets to form a pyramid. Each team is also given a ball which they can throw at another team's pyramid once to try and sabotage them, although their shot can be blocked by the targeted team.
- Checkpoint #4 (Camping Chaos): Teams must memorize a 42-item camping setup which they must recreate at their designated area around the corner. However, teams can only bring one item at a time while recreating the setup.
- Checkpoint #5 (Pho King Trivia) and Overnight Stage: Each team begins with one large bowl of phở and several containers of off-putting ingredients such as chilli peppers and coconut worms. Each round, one team member is asked a question about their partner. If they answer correctly, they can pour one of the ingredients into another team's bowl, but if the answer is incorrect, they must pour one of the containers into their own bowl. After four rounds, teams must consume their entire bowl of phở using giant straws to complete the checkpoint. Afterwards, teams spend the night camping at the checkpoint site.

Day two

- Checkpoint #6 (High Tide): Teams must paddle a basket boat one mile down a river.
- Checkpoint #7 (Shoulder the Load): Teams must use a Vietnamese carrying pole to collect water from a river and fill their team's cylinder.
- Checkpoint #8 (Balance Them All): Teams must distribute 20 bags of varying weights, as well as themselves, on a see-saw until it balances out.
  - Split or Steal twist: After being declared the winners of the season, Adam and Steve both privately answer whether they believe their partner would split or steal the $250,000 prize. If their answers do not match, a challenge is held to determine the winner of the entire $250,000 final prize.

Final results

- Winners: Adam & Steve ($250,000; both split the prize money)
- Runners-up: Da'Vonne & Shane ($35,000)
- Third place: Frank & Sam ($10,000)
- Fourth place: Melissa & Nicole ($5,000)

== Game summary ==
Episode		Winners	Jungle contestants		Jungle game	Jungle outcome		
#	Challenge	Winners	Voted in	Winners' pick	Jungle game	Winners	Eliminated	Star stolen
1	Frenemies	Adam & Steve	—N/a (Note: The "Frenemies" challenge in episode 1 was used to determine the initial four Star holders. No house vote or elimination round was held afterwards.)					
1	Frenemies	Ashley K. & Dario	—N/a					
1	Frenemies	Devin & Leroy	—N/a					
1	Frenemies	Nany & Turbo	—N/a					
2	Edge of Glory	Amber & Faysal	Adam & Steve	Beth & Jonna	Pole Position	Adam & Steve	Beth & Jonna	—N/a
3	Ball Buster	Devin & Leroy	Adam & Steve	KellyAnne & Sylvia	Pile It On	Adam & Steve	KellyAnne & Sylvia	—N/a
4	Push Over	Amber & Faysal	Adam & Steve	Aneesa & Ashley M.	Downpour	Adam & Steve	Aneesa & Ashley M.	—N/a
5	Sundae Funday	Frank & Sam	Adam & Steve	Devin & Leroy	Over a Barrel	Adam & Steve	Devin & Leroy	—N/a
6	Playing Dirty	Adam & Steve	Ashley K. & Dario	Big T & Corey	Stack Attack	Ashley K. & Dario	Big T & Corey	—N/a
7	Blow Your Mind	Katie & Veronica	Amber & Faysal	Nany & Turbo	Scratch Off	Nany & Turbo	Amber & Faysal	—N/a
8	Shooting for the Star	Adam & Steve	Ashley K. & Dario	Nany & Turbo	Hold Up	Nany & Turbo	Ashley K. & Dario	—N/a
9	Bubble Bullseye	Da'Vonne & Shane	Melissa & Nicole	Katie & Veronica	Pin Pop	Melissa & Nicole	Katie & Veronica	Nany & Turbo
10	Pressure Sandwich	Frank & Sam	Nany & Turbo	Adam & Steve	Star Bluff	Adam & Steve	Nany & Turbo	—N/a
11/12	Final Challenge	Adam & Steve	2nd: Da'Vonne & Shane, 3rd: Frank & Sam, 4th: Melissa & Nicole					

=== Episode progress ===
Teams	Episodes										
Teams	1	2	3	4	5	6	7	8	9	10	Finale
Adam & Steve	STAR	ELIM	ELIM	ELIM	ELIM	WIN	SAFE	WIN	SAFE	ELIM	WINNERS
Da'Vonne & Shane	SAFE	SAFE	SAFE	SAFE	SAFE	SAFE	SAFE	SAFE	WIN	SAFE	SECOND
Frank & Sam	SAFE	SAFE	SAFE	SAFE	WIN	STAR	SAFE	SAFE	SAFE	WIN	THIRD
Melissa & Nicole	SAFE	SAFE	SAFE	SAFE	SAFE	SAFE	SAFE	SAFE	ELIM	SAFE	FOURTH
Nany & Turbo	STAR	SAFE	SAFE	SAFE	SAFE	SAFE	ELIM	ELIM	SAFE	OUT	
Katie & Veronica	SAFE	SAFE	SAFE	SAFE	SAFE	SAFE	WIN	SAFE	OUT		
Ashley K. & Dario	STAR	SAFE	SAFE	SAFE	SAFE	ELIM	SAFE	OUT			
Amber & Faysal	SAFE	WIN	SAFE	WIN	SAFE	SAFE	OUT				
Big T & Corey	SAFE	SAFE	SAFE	SAFE	SAFE	OUT					
Devin & Leroy	STAR	SAFE	WIN	SAFE	OUT						
Aneesa & Ashley M.	SAFE	SAFE	SAFE	OUT							
KellyAnne & Sylvia	SAFE	SAFE	OUT								
Beth & Jonna	SAFE	OUT									

Competition key
The team won the Final Challenge
The team did not win the Final Challenge
The team won the daily challenge and was immune (and received a Star if the challenge was a Star challenge)
The team earned a Star in the daily challenge
The team was safe from the Jungle.
The team was nominated for the Jungle and won
The team lost in the Jungle and was eliminated

=== Voting progress ===
House vote	Adam & Steve; 9 of 12 votes	Adam & Steve; 9 of 11 votes	Adam & Steve; Volunteered	Adam & Steve; 5 of 9 votes	Ashley K. & Dario; 7 of 8 votes	Amber & Faysal; 4 of 7 votes	Ashley K. & Dario; 4 of 6 votes	Melissa & Nicole; Volunteered	Nany & Turbo; 4 of 4 votes
Winners' vote	Beth & Jonna	KellyAnne & Sylvia	Aneesa & Ashley M.	Devin & Leroy	Big T & Corey	Nany & Turbo	Nany & Turbo	Katie & Veronica	Adam & Steve
Voter	Episodes								
Voter	2	3	4	5	6	7	8	9	10
Adam & Steve	Big T & Corey (Note: In episode 5, Adam & Steve voted for Big T & Corey as they had already voted them before, thereby confirming their vote in episode 2 (which was not shown on-screen) to be Big T & Corey.)	Frank & Sam	Adam & Steve	Big T & Corey	Big T & Corey	Amber & Faysal	Nany & Turbo	—N/a	Nany & Turbo
Da'Vonne & Shane	Adam & Steve	Adam & Steve	—N/a	Adam & Steve	Ashley K. & Dario	Frank & Sam	Ashley K. & Dario	Katie & Veronica	Nany & Turbo
Frank & Sam	Adam & Steve	Adam & Steve	—N/a	Devin & Leroy	Ashley K. & Dario	Amber & Faysal	Frank & Sam	—N/a	Adam & Steve
Melissa & Nicole	Beth & Jonna	Adam & Steve	—N/a	Adam & Steve	Ashley K. & Dario	Amber & Faysal	Ashley K. & Dario	Melissa & Nicole	Nany & Turbo
Nany & Turbo	Adam & Steve	Adam & Steve	—N/a	Melissa & Nicole	Ashley K. & Dario	Frank & Sam	Ashley K. & Dario	—N/a	Nany & Turbo
Katie & Veronica	Big T & Corey	Big T & Corey	—N/a	Big T & Corey	Ashley K. & Dario	Nany & Turbo	Ashley K. & Dario	—N/a	
Ashley K. & Dario	Adam & Steve	Adam & Steve	—N/a	Adam & Steve	Ashley K. & Dario	Amber & Faysal	Nany & Turbo		
Amber & Faysal	Beth & Jonna	Adam & Steve	Aneesa & Ashley M.	Adam & Steve	Melissa & Nicole	Frank & Sam			
Big T & Corey	Adam & Steve	Adam & Steve	—N/a	Adam & Steve	Ashley K. & Dario				
Devin & Leroy	Adam & Steve	KellyAnne & Sylvia	—N/a	Melissa & Nicole					
Aneesa & Ashley M.	Adam & Steve	Adam & Steve	—N/a						
KellyAnne & Sylvia	Adam & Steve	Adam & Steve							
Beth & Jonna	Adam & Steve								

=== Star progress ===
Star	Episodes										
Star	1	2	3	4	5	6	7	8	9	10	11/12
1	Adam & Steve										
2	Devin & Leroy					Frank & Sam					
3	Ashley K. & Dario								Da'Vonne & Shane		
4	Nany & Turbo									Melissa & Nicole	

Star holder at the start of each episode.

=== Final Challenge scoreboard ===
Team	Checkpoint								Total	Placement
Team	1	2	3	4	5	6	7	8	Total	Placement
Adam & Steve	2	3	4	1	4	3	3	4	24	1st
Da'Vonne & Shane	3	4	2	4	2	1	4	3	23	2nd
Frank & Sam	0	1	3	3	3	4	0	2	16	3rd
Melissa & Nicole	4	2	1	2	1	2	0	1	13	4th

== Episodes ==
No. overall	No. in season	Title	Original release date	US viewers (millions)
42	1	"A Star Studded Ar-Rival"	January 29, 2025	0.31
43	2	"Rivals on the Edge"	February 5, 2025	0.25
44	3	"Rivals in the Ruff"	February 12, 2025	0.40
45	4	"Ring Around the Rival"	February 19, 2025	0.34
46	5	"Tri–Rival Pursuit"	February 26, 2025	0.36
47	6	"A Star–Holder is Born"	March 5, 2025	0.30
48	7	"Old Friends, New Rivals"	March 12, 2025	0.30
49	8	"You D–Rival Me Crazy"	March 19, 2025	0.27
50	9	"Star–Crossed Rivals"	March 26, 2025	0.30
51	10	"This is Why We're Rivals"	April 2, 2025	0.23
52	11	"A Race for the Stars"	April 9, 2025	0.25
53	12	"An Un–Rivaled Twist"	April 16, 2025	0.28
