= Magic polygon =

A magic polygon is a polygonal magic graph with integers on its vertices.

== Perimeter magic polygon ==
A magic polygon, also called a perimeter magic polygon, is a polygon with an integers on its sides that all add up to a magic constant. It is where positive integers (from 1 to N) on a k-sided polygon add up to a constant. Magic polygons are a generalization of other magic shapes such as magic triangles.

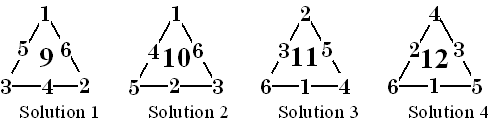
This displays order 3 magic triangles, a type of magic polygon.

== Magic polygon with a center point ==
Victoria Jakicic and Rachelle Bouchat defined magic polygons as n-sided regular polygons with 2n+1 nodes such that the sum of the three nodes are equal. In their definition, a 3 × 3 magic square can be viewed as a magic 4-gon. There are no magic odd-gons with this definition.

== Magic polygons and degenerated magic polygons ==
Danniel Dias Augusto and Josimar da Silva defined the magic polygon P(n,k) as a set of vertices of $k/2$ concentric n-gon and a center point. In this definition, magic polygons of Victoria Jakicic and Rachelle Bouchat can be viewed as P(n,2) magic polygons. They also defined degenerated magic polygons.

== See also ==
- Magic square
