= Big Brother 16 (American season) =

Season of the US television series

Coordinates: 34°8′40.12″N 118°23′20.71″W

Big Brother
- Season 16
- One of promotional posters for Big Brother 16
- Hosted by: Julie Chen
- No. of days: 97
- No. of houseguests: 16
- Winner: Derrick Levasseur
- Runner-up: Cody Calafiore
- America's Favorite HouseGuest: Donny Thompson
- Companion shows: Big Brother: Live Chat; Big Brother: After Dark
- No. of episodes: 40

Release
- Original network: CBS
- Original release: June 25 – September 24, 2014

Additional information
- Filming dates: June 20 – September 24, 2014

Season chronology
- ← Previous; Season 15 Next → Season 17

Big Brother 16 is the sixteenth season of the American reality television series Big Brother. The season premiered on June 25, 2014, with a two-night premiere with the following episode airing on June 26, 2014, broadcast on CBS in the United States and Global in Canada, and ended with a 90-minute season finale on September 24, 2014, after 97 days of competition. Julie Chen returned as host. On September 24, 2014, Derrick Levasseur was crowned the winner defeating Cody Calafiore in a 7–2 jury vote. Donny Thompson was voted as the season's America's Favorite HouseGuest.

== Format ==
The format has changed slightly from previous seasons. The contestants, who are referred to as "HouseGuests," are sequestered in the Big Brother House with no contact to or from the outside world. Each week, the HouseGuests take part in several compulsory challenges that determine who will win food, luxuries and power in the House. The winner of the weekly Head of Household (HoH) competition, who was formerly guaranteed safety, can now be overthrown due to a new competition called the "Battle of the Block." The two winners of the HoH competition each week will pick two nominees, who then go head-to-head in this competition. The winning team is guaranteed a week of safety and overthrows the HoH who nominated them. The HouseGuests nominated for eviction by the other HoH then become the official nominees for the week. The Battle of the Block twist was retired after Week 8, with only one HouseGuest being awarded HoH and two nominees at all times. The reigning HoH also earns the right to name the "Have-Nots" for the week, forcing the chosen HouseGuests to eat solely "Big Brother slop" along with a weekly food restriction (chosen by the viewing public), take cold showers and sleep on cold beds in a freezer-like bedroom.

Each week, six HouseGuests are selected to compete in the Power of Veto competition: the reigning HoH, their two nominees, and three HouseGuests selected by random draw. The winner of the POV competition wins the right to either revoke the nomination of one of the nominated HouseGuests or leave them as is; if the Veto winner uses this power, the HoH must immediately nominate another HouseGuest for eviction.

On eviction night, all HouseGuests except for the HoH (who is only allowed to vote in the event of a tie and must announce it in front of the other HouseGuests) and the nominees vote to evict one of the two nominees. This compulsory vote is conducted in the privacy of the Diary Room by the host Julie Chen. Unlike most other versions of Big Brother, the HouseGuests may discuss the nomination and eviction process openly and freely. The nominee with the greatest number of votes will be evicted from the House on the weekly live broadcast, exiting to an adjacent studio to be interviewed, after which the cycle begins again.

HouseGuests may voluntarily leave the House at any time and those who break the rules may be expelled from the house, with the most recent case in Big Brother 14. The last nine evicted HouseGuests will vote for the winner on the season finale. These "Jury Members" will be sequestered in a separate house and will not be allowed to watch the show except for competitions and ceremonies that include all of the remaining HouseGuests. The jury members will not be shown any Diary Room interviews or any footage that may include strategy or details regarding nominations.

=== Battle of the Block ===
In comparison to previous seasons of Big Brother which featured a single Head of Household, this season would involve two Heads of Household throughout part of the season. Each HoH would nominate two other HouseGuests for eviction, totaling four nominees. The two pairs of nominees would then compete in a new competition titled "Battle of the Block". The winning pair would be removed from the block, with the HoH who nominated them dethroned. The dethroned HoH would later be eligible to be nominated after the Power of Veto has been used, while the Battle of the Block winners are safe for the rest of the week. The rest of the cycle would continue as per usual, with the remaining HoH retaining immunity for the week, and the two nominees being eligible for safety through the Power of Veto.

=== Team America ===
Host Julie Chen introduced "Team America" during the first premiere show. This twist involved three HouseGuests, chosen by public vote, who would form a secret alliance in the house and work together to perform secret missions throughout the season. For every successfully completed mission, each member of the team would receive $5,000. Before the season began, fans were asked to vote for which HouseGuest they would want to form an alliance with, based on short biographies written by the HouseGuests themselves. The HouseGuests with the most votes would become the first member of "Team America," with the winners of this poll being revealed to the viewers on the second night premiere show. Team America was adapted from the "America's Player" twist from Big Brother 8 and Big Brother 10.

On the second night premiere show, Julie announced that Joey was voted by the viewers as the first member of Team America, and that the second member would be revealed on the first live show. On that live show, Joey was evicted and Donny was revealed as the new member of Team America. On the July 9, 2014 episode, it was announced that Derrick and Frankie would join Donny to complete the Team America trio. Throughout the season, the viewing audience was asked to vote between two tasks, one of which would be given to Team America.

It was later revealed that if a member of Team America won the game (in addition to the $500,000 prize), they would receive a bonus $50,000 in addition to their Team America winnings, which was achieved by member Derrick Levasseur, totalling his winnings to $575,000, which included the $5,000 in the Sloppy the Snowman competition where he opted for the 5,000 dollas and 5,000 hollas prize instead of winning the competition.

== HouseGuests ==
The cast of the sixteenth season of Big Brother Top: (from left to right) Paola, Joey, Devin, Nicole, Cody, Derrick, Christine, Hayden, Jocasta Bottom: (from left to right) Victoria, Caleb, Frankie, Amber, Zach, Brittany, Donny

Name	Age on entry	Occupation	Residence	Day entered	Result
Derrick Levasseur	30	Police sergeant	Providence, Rhode Island	1	Winner; Day 97
Cody Calafiore	23	Sales account executive	Howell, New Jersey	1	Runner-up; Day 97
Victoria Rafaeli	22	Photographer	Weston, Florida	1	Evicted; Day 97
Caleb Reynolds	26	Adventure hunting guide	Hopkinsville, Kentucky	1	Evicted; Day 90
Frankie Grande	31	YouTube personality	New York, New York	1	Evicted; Day 88
Christine Brecht	23	Barista	Tucson, Arizona	1	Evicted; Day 77
Nicole Franzel	21	Nursing graduate	Ubly, Michigan	63	Evicted; Day 77
Nicole Franzel	21	Nursing graduate	Ubly, Michigan	1	Evicted; Day 56
Donny Thompson	42	Groundskeeper	Albemarle, North Carolina	1	Evicted; Day 70
Zach Rance	23	Unemployed	Palm Beach, Florida	1	Evicted; Day 63
Hayden Voss	21	Pedicab driver	Long Beach, California	1	Evicted; Day 49
Jocasta Odom	33	Minister	Lovejoy, Georgia	1	Evicted; Day 49
Amber Borzotra	26	Esthetician	North Hollywood, California	1	Evicted; Day 42
Brittany Martinez	29	Event coordinator	Torrance, California	1	Evicted; Day 35
Devin Shepherd	26	Motorcycle sales manager	San Antonio, Texas	1	Evicted; Day 28
Paola Shea	27	DJ	Astoria, New York	1	Evicted; Day 21
Joanna "Joey" Van Pelt	27	Make-up artist	Seattle, Washington	1	Evicted; Day 14

=== Future appearances ===
In 2015, Caleb Reynolds made an appearance on Big Brother 17 to host the final Power of Veto competition.

In 2016, Nicole Franzel returned to compete as one of "four stowaways" on Big Brother 18. That same year, Frankie Grande went on to become a housemate on Celebrity Big Brother 18 in the UK.

In 2017, Nicole Franzel hosted the first Head of Household competition on Big Brother 19. Derrick Levasseur also returned that season to host an HOH competition.

In 2018, Nicole Franzel appeared on Big Brother 20, to be surprised by fellow Big Brother 18 HouseGuest Victor Arroyo with a marriage proposal, which she accepted, and then celebrated her engagement along with Derrick Levasseur and other alumni from the show; Derrick would appear again that season to share his thoughts.

In 2020, both Nicole Franzel and Cody Calafiore returned to compete on Big Brother: All-Stars.

In 2023, Frankie Grande made brief appearances in the premiere and finale episodes of Big Brother 25. Later that year, Grande competed with Cody Calafiore & Nicole Franzel on the holiday spinoff, Big Brother Reindeer Games.

In 2024, Derrick Levasseur made an appearance on Big Brother 26 to broadcast messages to the final three houseguests.

In 2025, Grande made an appearance on Big Brother 27. and Calafiore made an apperance on big brother season 27 to host the jury round table

==== Outside Big Brother ====
Caleb Reynolds competed on Survivor: Kaôh Rōng and Survivor: Game Changers.

In 2018, Caleb Reynolds appeared on MTV's Fear Factor with Cody Calafiore & Zach Rance.

In 2019, Nicole Franzel competed on The Amazing Race 31 with Victor Arroyo from big brother season 18.

In 2021, Amber Borzotra started competing on The Challenge, appearing on Double Agents, Spies, Lies, & Allies, and Ride or Dies.

In 2023, Cody Calafiore competed on the first season of Peacock's reality TV series The Traitors. Later that year, Amber Borzotra competed on The Challenge: World Championship.

In 2025, Derrick Levasseur competed on the third season of The Traitors. Later that year, Amber Borzotra competed on the fifth season of The Challenge: All Stars.

== Summary ==
Day 1, Julie introduced eight of the sixteen HouseGuests who moved into the house first. They were Paola, Donny, Cody, Frankie, Amber, Nicole, Devin, and Joey. Paola and Devin made an eight-person alliance called "The Crazy 8's" against the others who would enter soon. Paola flirted with Cody to get him as an ally. Devin made a side alliance with Donny, calling themselves the "Double-Ds." The four girls formed an "El Cuatro" alliance after Amber and Paola were adamant about a female winning this season. Later, the eight HouseGuests competed in the first HoH competition: Go Fly a Kite. The goal was to balance on a rotating log while trying to keep a kite from crushing a sand castle. Frankie won and became the first HoH. Julie told the first eight HouseGuests that when the other eight arrived, another HoH would also reign and that neither HoH would be safe yet. Following this announcement, Julie informed the viewing public that three HouseGuests ("Team America") would be chosen by poll and given tasks by the American public. Upon the successful completion of each task, the Team America members would receive $5,000 apiece.

Later on Day 1, the remaining eight HouseGuests moved in. These were Victoria, Caleb, Brittany, Christine, Derrick, Zach, Jocasta, and Hayden. The second group's HoH competition was Over the Coals. The goal was to be the last one to hold on to a large rotating stiff. The girls quickly fell, with Zach and Derrick soon following. Caleb won and became the second HoH. Julie informed the HouseGuests of how the dual-HoH twist would work: Frankie and Caleb would make separate nominations, meaning a total of four nominees on the block. Following the nominations, those four would compete as duos in the Battle of the Block competition. The duo that won the competition would be removed from the block and immune from being named the replacement nominee, while the HoH who nominated them would be dethroned and eligible to be the replacement nominee; meaning that the outgoing HOH could go from being HOH to being evicted within a week for the first time ever.

After the HoH rooms were revealed, Caleb and Frankie strategized. They decided to form an all-guy alliance with Devin, Derrick, Cody, and Zach called the "Bomb Squad." Elsewhere, Christine and Nicole hit it off and formed an alliance of their own. Wanting to balance out the all-male alliance and have the numbers on their side, Devin told Amber and Christine about the Bomb Squad and, without the alliance's supervision, made them members of the alliance, making his allies skeptical of his gameplay. They were also concerned with Devin's paranoia after he suggested that Donny was an intimidating force to be reckoned with. Frankie thought it would be best to nominate the people who fell off first during the HoH competitions. Caleb and Frankie agreed to each nominate two people from the group they did not enter with to avoid bringing attention to themselves. Caleb made his nominations first: Donny and Paola. Despite having formed a bond with Victoria, Frankie nominated her along with Brittany for being the first two who fell during their HoH competition.

After the nomination ceremony, the four nominees participated in the first-ever "Battle of the Block" competition, called The Pouring 20s. The objective was for one person to swing and get water in a glass cup, then throw the water into another glass cup held by the other person; that person would swing backward to dump the water into a glass vase full of berries. The first duo to fill the vase and spill a berry would win immunity, come off the block, and dethrone the HoH who nominated them. Following Brittany and Victoria's win, Caleb became the first official HoH of the summer while Donny and Paola were still on the chopping block. Fearing that the guys already made an all-guy alliance, Joey decided to make an all-girls alliance, which failed miserably. To make matters worse, she also decided to tell everyone about the all-girls alliance, placing a target on her back in the process. On Day 7, the first veto competition of the season, Miami Lice, took place. Cody, Victoria, and Zach were picked to play. Only Donny and Zach spelled valid words, and Donny won the Power of Veto for spelling the longest word. After the competition, Caleb talked to Joey about the all-girls alliance she tried to form, and Joey tried to apologize to Caleb about it and hoped that she wouldn't be the replacement nominee. At the veto meeting, Donny removed himself from the block, and Caleb named Joey as the replacement nominee. On Day 14, Joey became the first HouseGuest to be evicted from the house by a 13–0 vote.

Following Joey's eviction, the HoH competition called BB Rager was played. The object was to walk across a balance beam and carry six kegs to the other side. Amber was crowned the first HoH with seven girls competing, and Cody was originally crowned the second HoH with seven guys competing. However, after a review of the tape, it was determined that Cody had stepped off the beam and was disqualified. Devin was subsequently crowned the second HoH. That night, Devin and Amber received their HoH room and read their letters. Seeing his daughter's picture, Devin felt bad about his gameplay and apologized to Donny. He then held a house meeting telling everyone how he had falsely accused Donny and had forced Caleb to nominate him. Brittany realized that what Caleb had said about nominating those who fell first was a lie and said so. During a Bomb Squad chat, Frankie and Caleb told Devin that what he said had "thrown Caleb under the bus." They also informed him about what Brittany had said, which made her his prime target. At the nomination ceremony, Devin nominated Paola and Brittany. Then Amber nominated Hayden and Nicole. Before the Battle of the Block, Devin secretly asked Paola to throw the competition, vowing she would be safe if he wins the power of veto. On Day 14, Hayden and Nicole competed against Paola and Brittany in the We Did What?! Battle of the Block competition. The nominees were asked a question, then shown a slideshow. Next they had to search for the answer in the slides. If a HouseGuest buzzed in with the correct answer, they scored a point for their team. After each round, the team who scored the point gave a distraction, such as beer goggles or a leaky beer helmet, to the other team. An incorrect answer resulted in the other team gaining a point and their team receiving the distraction. The first team to four points won. Hayden and Nicole won the Battle of the Block, resulting in Amber being dethroned, Devin being the HoH for the week, and Brittany and Paola remaining on the block. Later in the week, Caleb revealed to Devin that the members of the Bomb Squad were planning on keeping Brittany over Paola, which caused Devin to have another house meeting where Zach admitted to wanting Devin out of the house. At the veto competition, called Big Brother Galaxy, Zach, Derrick, and Amber were chosen to compete, with Donny as the host. Devin won, and Brittany pleaded for him to use the veto on her, noting their similarities as being single parents. At the veto meeting, Devin used the POV on her, breaking the deal with Paola and nominating Zach in her place. On Day 21, Paola was evicted from the house by 10–2, with Donny and Jocasta voting for Zach.

Following Paola's eviction, HouseGuests played the HoH competition Underwater Polo, in which the goal was to knock a ball into the highest number slot, numbered 1–29, on the end of the field. Nicole and Derrick became the new HOHs with Nicole scoring a perfect 29 and Derrick scoring a 28. The main goal for the HouseGuests this week is to backdoor Devin. So Nicole nominated Amber and Donny for eviction, and Derrick selected Caleb and Jocasta. When the nomination ceremony was finished, it became clear to Devin that the HouseGuests wanted to backdoor him. Amber and Donny took on Caleb and Jocasta in the Abraca-BOB-ra Battle of the Block competition. In the competition, one HouseGuest ran across the yard to a bin containing puzzle pieces. Meanwhile, their partner was raised in the air next to their puzzle board. The first duo to complete their puzzle correctly and hit the button won the Battle of the Block, became immune from this week's eviction, made their HOH wear a frog costume for the rest of the week, and dethroned them. Donny and Amber prevailed, saved themselves, made Nicole wear the frog costume, and left Caleb and Jocasta on the block with Derrick as the sole HoH for the week. At the Tumblin' Dice POV competition, Donny, Devin, and Christine were chosen to compete. Jocasta, feeling ill from the Battle of the Block competition, sat out of the POV. Donny won and used the veto on Jocasta. Devin was named as the replacement nominee. On Day 28, Devin was evicted 11–0.

Following Devin's eviction, on Day 28, the HouseGuests were paired (Amber and Zach, Victoria and Christine, Caleb and Nicole, Cody and Frankie, Donny and Hayden, and Brittany and Jocasta) for the Deviled Eggs HoH competition. The goal was for the duos to maneuver an egg through chicken wire while passing it back and forth between partners. The first pair to collect 12 eggs was the winner. Cody and Frankie edged out Brittany and Jocasta to win Head of Household. After the HOH competition, it became clear to Derrick, Cody, Christine, Frankie, and Zach that the Bomb Squad was about to blow up, and with the tension between Caleb and Amber, they decided to start a new alliance called "The Detonators." The main goal for this week was to get Brittany evicted. On Day 29, Frankie nominated Amber and Jocasta, and Cody nominated Brittany and Victoria for eviction. Before the BOTB, Amber talked to Christine about working with her and Nicole to get the guys out of the house, but little did Amber know that Christine's true loyalty was the Detonators. Christine ratted Amber out, and it was official that next week, they were going to backdoor Amber if one of the Detonators won HOH. The nominees then played in the Knight Moves Battle of the Block competition. All four women started in a different corner of a giant chess board. They then alternated moving like a knight in chess. When a space was landed on, the space could not be landed on again. After Jocasta was eliminated, Amber beat Brittany and Victoria and won the Battle of the Block for her and Jocasta, took themselves off the block, guaranteed themselves safety for the week, dethroned Frankie, and left Brittany and Victoria on the block with Cody as the sole HoH for the week. On Day 30, Cody, Brittany and Victoria, along with Caleb, Nicole, and Zach, competed in the BB Cup POV competition. Each round, every player controlled a robotic leg in order to kick a soccer ball into a sectioned, numbered soccer net. After everyone had kicked, the person with the lowest score was eliminated and claimed a prize. People eliminated in later rounds could either keep their prize or trade for an already revealed prize. Cody got penalty kicks to the butt, Brittany had to score 2,400 soccer goals in 24 hours, Caleb won $5,000, Zach claimed a Germany vacation, Nicole was forced to wear a Germitard for a week, and Victoria won the POV. When Caleb took the $5,000 over the Veto, Cody seriously considered putting him up as a replacement nominee. But after Frankie told Derrick about this, he told Cody that it was a very bad game move and Derrick told Cody that his best option is to put up Donny as a pawn. On Day 33, Victoria used the Veto on herself. and Cody named Donny as the replacement nominee. On Day 35, Brittany was evicted by a 10–0 vote.

Following Brittany's eviction, HouseGuests participated in the HoH competition called Country Hits, where each person faced one another in pairs; the winner of each face-off picked the next pair to compete, and the loser was eliminated. The last two HouseGuests standing would both become the HOH. The object was to determine whether the subject of each song was either a previous HoH, Battle of the Block, or Power of Veto competition. Frankie became the first HoH after Derrick threw the competition out of respect for Frankie's grandfather dying. After Zach and Christine (the last two HouseGuests standing) faced off against one another, Zach became the second HoH. On Day 36, Zach nominated Nicole and Christine for eviction, and Frankie nominated Jocasta and Victoria for eviction. Following the Nomination Ceremony, everyone went to the backyard for the Wedding Cake Take Battle of the Block competition, where Jocasta and Victoria and Nicole and Christine competed for safety. Nicole and Christine won, dethroning Zach as Head of Household and leaving Jocasta and Victoria on the block with Frankie as the official HoH for the week. A few days before the veto, Hayden struck a deal with Victoria that if he wins the veto, then he'll use it on her. In the Sheriff Deputy Power of Veto competition, the HouseGuests had to rock their hips to make the horse they were seated on gallop. Once the horse galloped back and forth sixty times, they would dismount and have 30 seconds to stack gold bars on top of a giant inverted horseshoe. If the 30 seconds ran out, they would be eliminated, but they could re-enter by agreeing to eat slop. Jocasta was the only player who ran out of time, and she took the slop but still lost. Hayden won the POV and, with a plan to backdoor Amber in motion, used the veto on Victoria, and Frankie put Amber up against Jocasta. Just before the Veto meeting ended, Zach expressed his opinions on Amber; mostly on Caleb's crush on Amber such as him giving his blankets to Amber when she didn't get any from anyone else and him eating a pickle (the food that Caleb hates most) just to go on a date with her. But Amber didn't say a word, thus making Team America fail their mission for this week. On Day 42, Amber was evicted 9–0.

After Amber's eviction, the HouseGuests competed in the Getting Loopy competition. The HouseGuests saw clips of events that had occurred in the house. Julie asked questions based on those clips, and they answered with true or false. Anyone giving an incorrect answer was eliminated. Donny and Nicole became the new HoHs after a tie-breaker with Caleb, Derrick, and Zach. Nicole planned on getting revenge for Amber's eviction by backdooring Frankie while Team America decided to carry out their missions without Donny. When talking to Donny, Caleb said he didn't want to be up next to Victoria. Zach tried to use reverse psychology on Nicole, but she nominated him alongside Jocasta. Donny nominated Caleb and Victoria. The nominated HouseGuests competed in the Domino Effect Battle of the Block competition. The objective was to build a trail of dominoes leading to a red buzzer and include three punishment dominoes of their choice which also had to be knocked down in order to win. If the last domino pushed the red buzzer, the winning duo would be safe and dethrone the HoH who nominated them. When Zach and Jocasta's falling dominoes did not hit the buzzer, Caleb and Victoria won, dethroning Donny from his HoH reign. In winning the competition, they chose to be on slop for the next two weeks, wear Adam and Eve costumes while being chained together for 48 hours, and shave their hair (only Caleb had to shave). Christine, feeling like the third wheel between Nicole and Hayden, decided to tell Nicole a few fibs about Hayden which backfired, making Nicole not trust her anymore. Caleb, Victoria, and Christine were picked to compete for veto. Each of the six played individually in BB Comics, a test where they "zip lined" past a comic studio wall to look at 16 new superhero comics based on the HouseGuests. The players then recreated the wall using a multitude of possible comic covers. The player who correctly arranged the comics in the shortest time won the Veto. Everyone struggled with the multiple comics and the subtle differences between similar covers. Christine won the veto and, wanting to ensure that Zach would go home and not to rock the boat, decided to leave Nicole's nominations as they were, making Nicole's plan to backdoor Frankie blow up. The Hitmen and Caleb convinced the Detonators that Zach was a valuable "number", and they also told Frankie and Christine that if the veto were used, then Nicole was going to backdoor Frankie, leaving them in disbelief. So they decided to keep him and target Nicole and Hayden for elimination. On Day 49, Jocasta was evicted by 6–2, with Donny and Hayden voting for Zach, making her the first member of the Jury. The HouseGuests competed in the Mathcathlon HoH competition. Julie asked math questions based on events that took place in the house. The answer was either be more, less, or exactly. A wrong answer meant elimination. In round 3, Caleb and Christine were the last two. After the next round, Caleb was crowned the second HoH of the week. He nominated Hayden and Donny for eviction. Victoria, Zach, and Christine were picked to play in the live veto competition. The HouseGuests competed in the Best of Duck Power of Veto competition. The HouseGuests raced down their lane to the ball pit to search for a rubber ducky, bringing back one at a time for a total of 3 and hitting the buzzer. Donny won the POV and took himself off the block. Caleb nominated Nicole in his place. In a blindside, Hayden was evicted by 5–2, with only Cody and Donny voting for Nicole, making him the second member of the Jury.

Following Jocasta and Hayden's eviction, it became clear to Frankie that he was losing support in the house. Nicole and Christine won the BB Tourn-eye-ment HOH competition. At the Nomination Ceremony, Nicole nominated Caleb and Frankie, with Frankie being her target. Caleb asked to be nominated so he could throw the Battle of the Block in an attempt to evict Frankie. Christine nominated Zach and Donny for eviction. At the Battle of the Block competition Moving the Chain, Caleb, saying he would not help Frankie, sat down along the sidelines, as he, along with Nicole, believed Frankie was responsible for Amber's eviction. In this competition, the duos had to work together ten times to maneuver a ball sitting on a ledge to roll into designated holes by moving chains. The winners got to go on a tailgating trip, the Dallas Cowboys Experience with the official HoH of the week. Zach and Donny started out well, but Frankie single-handedly won the BOB, with no help from Caleb, dethroning Nicole and making Christine the official HoH for the week all in one fell swoop, leaving Zach and Donny on the block, with Zach the new official target of the week. After Frankie fought against Zach, he decided to tell his secret about his famous sister, Ariana Grande, to buy himself more time to mend the bridges that he broke. The veto competition, OTEV the Pissed-Off Penguin featured a waterfall and a giant penguin (voiced by Gilbert Gottfried). In a musical-chairs type set-up, participants had to retrieve drink cards named after the HouseGuest that the penguin called out. Zach won and took himself off the block. Rather than face the anger of the Detonators, Christine put up Nicole as a replacement nominee after Caleb, Cody, and Derrick told her that in another scenario, if Frankie won the veto, then Nicole was going to backdoor her. On Day 56, Nicole was evicted 6–0, becoming the third member of the Jury.

Following Nicole's eviction, Derrick and Frankie won the next HoH competition, Dead of Household. With the Battle of the Block upcoming and the fact that the Bomb Squad members had decided to leave Victoria safe (as she remains the only HouseGuest who has yet to become HoH at least once), they needed three volunteers to go on the block. With nobody willing to volunteer, they drew Skittles out of a hat to determine the nominations. Christine was drawn to go on the block with Donny as Derrick's nominations, with Caleb and Cody going up as Frankie's. On Day 57, in the Battle of the Block competition, the players entered the Big Black Box and searched for five bones that were then placed in a scoreboard on the wall. Christine's plan to throw the competition failed when Donny located all five bones on his own, winning the competition and ensuring safety for the week for himself and Christine, dethroning Derrick, making Frankie the official HoH for the week, and leaving Caleb and Cody on the block. Zingbot 3000 made a return and brought Kathy Griffin with him. That same day, Frankie won the POV in the Zingbot Reboot competition. Frankie used the Veto on Caleb in an attempt to mend fences with him after Amber's eviction. The Detonators' plan to backdoor Zach and bring "Team Zankie" to an end was put into motion after Frankie nominated Zach as Caleb's replacement. On Day 63, Zach was evicted 5–0, becoming the fourth member of the Jury. Julie revealed to the HouseGuests that as of Week 9, there would no longer be a dual HoH and, accordingly, no Battle of the Block.

Following Zach's eviction, Nicole, Hayden, Jocasta, and Zach, who was evicted moments earlier, returned to the house and competed in Comeback Fight, where one of them would win the right to come back into the game. By a single disk, Nicole won and was given a second chance to win $500,000. The remaining eight HouseGuests competed in the Punching for Days HoH competition, where they had to identify the dates of various BB occurrences. After six rounds of competition, Cody was declared the first sole HoH of the season. On Day 64, Donny and Nicole were nominated for eviction. That same day, HouseGuests competed in the BBB Scorpion Power of Veto competition. HouseGuests were asked to guess how many of a certain item there were in a set and were rewarded with a security clearance ticket if they stayed rather than fold. The first HouseGuest to obtain three movie tickets was the winner, which was Cody. A plan was discussed to backdoor Frankie, but Derrick convinced Cody that it would be a poor game move to do so, so Cody decided not to use the POV. On Day 70, Donny was evicted 5–0, becoming the fourth member of the Jury after Nicole returned to the game.

Following Donny's eviction, Caleb won his third HoH competition of the season in an ice-themed endurance competition, Sloppy the Snowman, while Derrick chose to go for a $5,000 cash option. Caleb decided to be in agreement with the house and focus on getting Nicole evicted. Therefore, he nominated Nicole and Christine for eviction. But Derrick had another target in mind, which is Christine. So Derrick told Nicole that she must win the veto, and they were going to vote Christine out. But if things go south, then they were going to backdoor Frankie. However, Christine won the POV in a memory competition called BB Blast, Inc. But the night before the veto meeting, Nicole compared Derrick to "Big Brother" legend Dan Gheesling, which made Derrick realize that backdooring Frankie isn't the best option and if Nicole stays and tells everyone about him and Dan Gheesling, then it's certain that Derrick is the next one out. At the veto meeting, she removed herself from the block, and Caleb selected Victoria as her replacement. In a 4–0 vote, Nicole was evicted for the second time and became the fifth jury member. Almost immediately, with this being a double-eviction night, a Head of Household true-or-false competition was held which Derrick won with the only correct answer to the first question. He placed Christine and Victoria on the block, Frankie won the POV triple-maze competition, Mazed and Confused, did not use the veto, and Christine was evicted in a 3–0 vote, becoming the sixth juror.

Soon after Nicole and Christine's Eviction, Julie announced a new twist, the Big Brother Rewind, a large button in the middle of the former have-not room. The HouseGuests argued about the pros and cons of pushing the button. Frankie won the following HOH competition called Seed Saw. In spite of only having guesses as to the consequences of pushing the rewind button, all the HouseGuests pushed it at the same time, which started a countdown clock. In a surprise, Jeff Schroeder and Jordan Lloyd returned to the Big Brother house, and Jeff proposed to Jordan with both their families present. After the festivities, Frankie nominated Cody and Victoria for eviction. The HouseGuests then competed in the BB Freakshow face morph POV competition, which Frankie won. He kept the nominations the same. On Day 84, due to the pressing of the golden button, the eviction was cancelled and the Big Brother game rewound one week, right before the last HOH competition. All of the HouseGuests except Derrick (who was the outgoing HOH at the time) competed in the Seed Saw competition for a second time. This time, Caleb won HOH, and a plan to send Frankie home was put in motion by the other guys. After a 'luxury competition" where the Jury members destroyed the house in the "Jury Fury" competition, where the jury members had to find knock out pucks and Hayden and Victoria each won $5000, Caleb nominated Frankie and Victoria. In a redo of the BB Freakshow competition, Cody won the Power of Veto and chose to keep the nominations the same. Frankie, in a last-ditch effort to stay, threatened the other guys, claiming that if he were to go to jury he would be able to sway everyone's votes, but this fell on deaf ears and on Day 88, Frankie was evicted by 2–0 and became the seventh member of the jury.

Shortly after Frankie's eviction, Derrick won the Foggy Memory "Before or After" HOH competition, securing a spot in the final three. He nominated Caleb and Victoria for eviction. Cody won the Power of Veto in the Stalking the Veto competition, sponsored by CBS' new show Stalker. On Day 90, Cody cast the sole vote to evict Caleb, making him the eighth member of the jury.

Following Caleb's eviction, the final three competed in the first part of the final HOH competition, Fly High or Bye-Bye. The HouseGuests had to stand on a ledge while holding on to a hangglider. The last HouseGuest holding on to their glider will win Part One of the Final HOH and advance to Part Three. Cody hung on the longest and won. On Day 92, Derrick and Victoria competed in the second part of the final HOH, BBgypt. While competing individually, Derrick and Victoria had to scale the wall of a giant pyramid, searching for the names of the evicted HouseGuests. They then had to place the final nominees in each corresponding week. The HouseGuest who finishes faster will face off against Cody on finale night. Derrick was the winner. On Day 97, Cody and Derrick faced off in the part three of the final Head of Household, The Scales of Just-Us. They were asked questions based on how the jury members completed various statements. After 7 questions ended in a 4–4 tie, Cody and Derrick answered a tiebreaker question to decide who would win part three, and therefore the final, HOH. Cody was closer to the correct number and became the final Head of Household. Cody evicted Victoria, making her the ninth member of the jury, and bringing Derrick to the final two. By a 7–2 vote, Derrick won the half million dollar prize, plus an additional $50,000 due to being a member of Team America. Donny, Nicole, and Zach were the top three votegetters for America's Favorite HouseGuest, but Donny claimed the $25,000 with over 5 million out of the 10 million votes cast.

== Episodes ==
No. overall	No. in season	Title	Original release date
506	1	"Episode 1"	June 25, 2014
507	2	"Episode 2"	June 26, 2014
508	3	"Episode 3"	June 29, 2014
509	4	"Episode 4"	July 2, 2014
510	5	"Episode 5"	July 3, 2014
511	6	"Episode 6"	July 6, 2014
512	7	"Episode 7"	July 9, 2014
513	8	"Episode 8"	July 10, 2014
514	9	"Episode 9"	July 13, 2014
515	10	"Episode 10"	July 16, 2014
516	11	"Episode 11"	July 17, 2014
517	12	"Episode 12"	July 20, 2014
518	13	"Episode 13"	July 23, 2014
519	14	"Episode 14"	July 24, 2014
520	15	"Episode 15"	July 27, 2014
521	16	"Episode 16"	July 30, 2014
522	17	"Episode 17"	July 31, 2014
523	18	"Episode 18"	August 3, 2014
524	19	"Episode 19"	August 6, 2014
525	20	"Episode 20"	August 7, 2014
526	21	"Episode 21"	August 10, 2014
527	22	"Episode 22"	August 13, 2014
528	23	"Episode 23"	August 14, 2014
529	24	"Episode 24"	August 17, 2014
530	25	"Episode 25"	August 20, 2014
531	26	"Episode 26"	August 21, 2014
532	27	"Episode 27"	August 24, 2014
533	28	"Episode 28"	August 27, 2014
534	29	"Episode 29"	August 28, 2014
535	30	"Episode 30"	August 31, 2014
536	31	"Episode 31"	September 3, 2014
537	32	"Episode 32"	September 4, 2014
538	33	"Episode 33"	September 7, 2014
539	34	"Episode 34"	September 9, 2014
540	35	"Episode 35"	September 10, 2014
541	36	"Episode 36"	September 14, 2014
542	37	"Episode 37"	September 16, 2014
543	38	"Episode 38"	September 17, 2014
544	39	"Episode 39"	September 19, 2014
545	40	"Episode 40"	September 24, 2014

== Voting history ==
Color key:

Winner
Runner-up
Head of Household
Nominated for eviction
Won Immunity via competition
Evicted
Re-entered the game

Voting history (season 16)
	Week 1	Week 2	Week 3	Week 4	Week 5	Week 6		Week 7	Week 8	Week 9	Week 10		Week 11	Week 12		Week 13	
	Week 1	Week 2	Week 3	Week 4	Week 5	Day 42	Day 49 (Note: This week was a double eviction week. Following the first eviction, the remaining HouseGuests played a regular week's worth of games, including Head of Household and veto competitions, and nomination, veto and eviction ceremonies, during the live show, culminating in a second eviction for the week. This also resulted in no Battle of the Block due to time constrants.)	Week 7	Week 8	Week 9	Day 70	Day 77	Week 11	Day 83	Day 88	Day 97	Finale
Head(s) of Household	Caleb; ~~Frankie~~ (Note: This Head of Household was dethroned after their nominees won the Battle of the Block competition.)	~~Amber~~; Devin	Derrick; ~~Nicole~~	Cody; ~~Frankie~~	Frankie; ~~Zach~~	~~Donny~~; Nicole	Caleb	Christine; ~~Nicole~~	~~Derrick~~; Frankie	Cody	Caleb	Derrick	Frankie	Caleb	Derrick	Cody	(None)
Battle of the Block winners	Brittany; Victoria	Hayden; Nicole	Amber; Donny	Amber; Jocasta	Christine; Nicole	Caleb; Victoria	(None)	Caleb; Frankie	Christine; Donny	(None)						(None)	(None)
Nominations (initial)	Donny; Paola	Brittany; Paola	Caleb; Jocasta	Brittany; Victoria	Jocasta; Victoria	Jocasta; Zach	Donny; Hayden	Donny; Zach	Caleb; Cody	Donny; Nicole	Christine; Nicole	Christine; Victoria	Cody; Victoria	Frankie; Victoria	Caleb; Victoria	(None)	(None)
Veto winner	Donny	Devin	Donny	Victoria	Hayden	Christine	Donny	Zach	Frankie	Cody	Christine	Frankie	Frankie	Cody	Cody	(None)	(None)
Nominations (final)	Joey; Paola	Paola; Zach	Caleb; Devin	Brittany; Donny	Amber; Jocasta	Jocasta; Zach	Hayden; Nicole	Donny; Nicole	Cody; Zach	Donny; Nicole	Nicole; Victoria	Christine; Victoria	Cody; Victoria	Frankie; Victoria	Caleb; Victoria	Derrick; Victoria	(None)
Derrick	Joey	Paola	Head of Household	Brittany	Amber	Jocasta	Hayden	Nicole	Zach	Donny	Nicole	Head of Household	No vote	Frankie	Head of Household	Nominated	Winner
Cody	Joey	Paola	Devin	Head of Household	Amber	Jocasta	Nicole	Nicole	Nominated	Head of Household	Nicole	Christine	Nominated	Frankie	Caleb	Victoria (Note: As Head of Household, Cody chose to evict Victoria.)	Runner-up
Victoria	Joey (Note: This player received immunity for winning the Battle of the Block competition.)	Paola	Devin	Brittany	Amber	Jocasta	Hayden	Nicole	Zach	Donny	Nominated	Nominated	Nominated	Nominated	Nominated	Evicted (Day 97)	Derrick
Caleb	Head of Household	Paola	Nominated	Brittany	Amber	Jocasta	Head of Household	Nicole	Zach	Donny	Head of Household	Christine	No vote	Head of Household	Nominated	Evicted (Day 90)	Derrick
Frankie	Joey	Paola	Devin	Brittany	Head of Household	Jocasta	Hayden	Nicole	Head of Household	Donny	Nicole	Christine	Head of Household	Nominated	Evicted (Day 88)		Derrick
Christine	Joey	Paola	Devin	Brittany	Amber	Jocasta	Hayden	Head of Household	Zach	Donny	Nicole	Nominated	Evicted (Day 77)				Derrick
Nicole	Joey	Paola	Devin	Brittany	Amber	Head of Household	Nominated	Nominated	Evicted (Day 56)	Nominated	Nominated	Re-evicted (Day 77)					Derrick
Donny	Joey	Zach	Devin	Nominated	Amber	Zach	Nicole	Nominated	Zach	Nominated	Evicted (Day 70)						Cody
Zach	Joey	Nominated	Devin	Brittany	Amber	Nominated	Hayden	Nicole	Nominated	Evicted (Day 63)							Derrick
Hayden	Joey	Paola	Devin	Brittany	Amber	Zach	Nominated	Evicted (Day 49)									Derrick
Jocasta	Joey	Zach	Devin	Brittany	Nominated	Nominated	Evicted (Day 49)										Cody
Amber	Joey	Paola	Devin	Brittany	Nominated	Evicted (Day 42)											
Brittany	Joey	Paola	Devin	Nominated	Evicted (Day 35)												
Devin	Joey	Head of Household	Nominated	Evicted (Day 28)													
Paola	Nominated	Nominated	Evicted (Day 21)														
Joey	Nominated	Evicted (Day 14)															
Evicted	Joey; 13 of 13 votes to evict	Paola; 10 of 12 votes to evict	Devin; 11 of 11 votes to evict	Brittany; 10 of 10 votes to evict	Amber; 9 of 9 votes to evict	Jocasta; 6 of 8 votes to evict	Hayden; 5 of 7 votes to evict	Nicole; 6 of 6 votes to evict	Zach; 5 of 5 votes to evict	Nicole; Won re-entry into game (Note: Jocasta, Hayden, Nicole, and Zach competed for a chance to re-enter the game. Nicole won the competition and re-entered the house.)	Nicole; 4 of 4 votes to evict	Christine; 3 of 3 votes to evict	Eviction cancelled (Note: Following Christine's eviction, a golden buzzer appeared in the House. Unbeknownst to the HouseGuests, the golden buzzer was a "rewind button"; if the button were pressed, the week would continue as normal until the live eviction, but the eviction would be cancelled, and events would be rewound to Day 77 after Christine's eviction. The rewind button was pressed on Day 77. Frankie was eligible to play in the HoH competition that followed as his reign was "rewound," but Derrick was ineligible to play because he was the HoH during Christine's eviction.)	Frankie; 2 of 2 votes to evict	Caleb; Cody's choice to evict	Victoria; Cody's choice to evict	Derrick; 7 votes to win
Evicted	Joey; 13 of 13 votes to evict	Paola; 10 of 12 votes to evict	Devin; 11 of 11 votes to evict	Brittany; 10 of 10 votes to evict	Amber; 9 of 9 votes to evict	Jocasta; 6 of 8 votes to evict	Hayden; 5 of 7 votes to evict	Nicole; 6 of 6 votes to evict	Zach; 5 of 5 votes to evict	Donny; 5 of 5 votes to evict	Nicole; 4 of 4 votes to evict	Christine; 3 of 3 votes to evict	Eviction cancelled	Frankie; 2 of 2 votes to evict	Caleb; Cody's choice to evict	Victoria; Cody's choice to evict	Cody; 2 votes to win

=== Team America task results ===
Joey was evicted before Team America's assembly was completed and thus received no tasks. Donny was evicted after seven tasks; he completed three, earning $15,000. Frankie completed four tasks, earning $20,000. Derrick completed five tasks (including the game winning bonus), earning $70,000.

Task	Options	America's selection	Details	Result
1	1. Get two HouseGuests to kiss and then breakup and then get back together and then spread rumors that they are in a showmance.; 2. Get three other HouseGuests to spread a rumor that someone in the game is related to a past HouseGuest.	B	Team America spread the rumor that Zach was related to Amanda Zuckerman from Big Brother 15.	Completed
2	1. Campaign to nominate someone they believe is a floater not a threat.; 2. Campaign to nominate someone they believe is a physical threat.	B	Team America agreed that Amber was a physical threat; Frankie, as HoH, nominated Amber for eviction.	Completed
3	1. Hide a HouseGuest's personal items and convince him or her to publicly blame someone for doing it.; 2. Play the role of puppet master and get two HouseGuests to have an argument at either the nomination ceremony or the Veto meeting.	B	Team America convinced Zach to publicly criticize Christine and Nicole during the nomination ceremony, but they chose not to argue with him. Team America then convinced Zach to publicly criticize Amber during the Veto meeting, but she, too, did not engage in the argument.	Failed
4	1. Vote against the majority of the house and then publicly accuse two people during the eviction fallout.; 2. Get two members of Team America to become Heads of Household this week by winning it and/or convincing others to throw it.	A	Neither Donny, nor Derrick, decided to vote against the house; Frankie, as HoH, was not eligible to vote.	Failed
5	1. Work together to convince someone to go on the block as a pawn and then get them evicted.; 2. Have each member of Team America create and name a fake side alliance with the person they trust the least.	A	Team America decided not to complete the mission because Donny was nominated.	Failed
6	1. Create a distraction by hiding a favorite piece of clothing from each of the HouseGuests, then organize a neighborhood watch program to keep it from happening again 2. Weaken another player's game by keeping them awake for 24 hours straight.	A	After hiding a personal item from each HouseGuest, including themselves, Team America managed to start a neighborhood watch program for at least 24 hours.	Completed
7	Team America will create their own mission and America will vote on whether or not the mission was a success.	N/A	Team America decided to organize and put on a play parodying the evicted HouseGuests. America did not, however, vote on this mission as a success.	Failed
8	1. Wear down the competition by convincing everyone to fast for 24 hours while Team America secretly eats.; 2. Wear down the competition by convincing everyone there's a rodent in the house and keep them up all night trying to catch it.	B	Team America managed to convince the other HouseGuests that there was a rat in the house, and got them to stay awake until 6 am on "rat patrol" to catch it.	Completed
9	A member of Team America must win the game. If successful, the one member who wins would receive $50,000 instead of the usual $5,000 reward for completed tasks.	N/A	Derrick won against Cody in the jury vote, 7–2.	Completed

== Production ==
Big Brother 16 was officially announced on September 12, 2013, a week before the finale of Big Brother 15. In March 2014, casting began with applicants being able to apply online or attend open casting calls throughout the country.

In June 2014, it was revealed that Big Brother 16 would be the first season of the series to be produced in 16:9 high-definition television. Plans to finally transition the show to HD were made as early as Big Brother 13, but were hampered by logistical challenges due to the nature of the program's format, such as the amount of video footage that would have to be stored and processed, and the need to install high definition cameras (which were also used to provide new shots and angles), wiring, and post-production equipment. The house was also remodeled to benefit from the transition. Big Brother was the last primetime program across the five major networks to still be broadcast in 4:3 standard definition, and the second-last network program in any daypart (the CBS daytime game show Let's Make a Deal was the only other holdout, but had commenced production in HD for its then-upcoming season).

Press interviews were filmed on June 17, 2014, the cast was announced on June 19, 2014, and the HouseGuests moved into the Big Brother house on June 20, 2014. Big Brother 16 began with a two-night premiere on June 25–26, 2014. On June 25, 2014, five days after the HouseGuests moved into the Big Brother house, eight of the 16 HouseGuests—Amber, Cody, Devin, Donny, Frankie, Joey, Nicole and Paola—were introduced, shown entering the house and taking part in the first HoH competition of the season, while on June 26, the eight HouseGuests who were not introduced the night before—Brittany, Caleb, Christine, Derrick, Hayden, Jocasta, Victoria and Zach—were introduced, shown entering the house and taking part in the second HoH competition. It was on the June 26 episode that the Team America and Battle of the Block twists were revealed.

== Reception ==
=== Viewing figures ===
Key
†	Season high for that night of the week

#	Air Date	United States				Source
#	Air Date	18–49 (rating/share)	Viewers (millions)	Rank (timeslot)	Rank (night)	Source
1	Wednesday, June 25, 2014	2.3/9	6.71	1	1	
2	Thursday, June 26, 2014	2.3/8	6.56	1	1	
3	Sunday, June 29, 2014	1.8/6	5.68	1	1	
4	Wednesday, July 2, 2014	1.8/7	5.67	2	2	
5	Thursday, July 3, 2014	1.6/6	4.83	1	2	
6	Sunday, July 6, 2014	1.9/7	6.01	1	2	
7	Wednesday, July 9, 2014	1.9/7	6.03	1	3	
8	Thursday, July 10, 2014	2.1/7	6.20	1	2	
9	Sunday, July 13, 2014	2.2/7	6.63	1	2	
10	Wednesday, July 16, 2014	2.1/8	6.22	1	2	
11	Thursday, July 17, 2014	2.2/8	6.11	1	2	
12	Sunday, July 20, 2014	2.2/8	6.27	1	2	
13	Wednesday, July 23, 2014	2.3/9	6.59	2	2	
14	Thursday, July 24, 2014	2.1/7	6.40	1	1	
15	Sunday, July 27, 2014	2.2/6	6.43	1	3	
16	Wednesday, July 30, 2014	2.3/9	6.50	1	2	
17	Thursday, July 31, 2014	2.2/7	6.29	1	2	
18^{1}	Sunday, August 3, 2014	2.0/7	6.58	2	3	
19	Wednesday, August 6, 2014	2.2/8	6.49	1	2	
20	Thursday, August 7, 2014	2.3/8	6.54	1	1	
21^{2}	Sunday, August 10, 2014	2.0/6	5.93	1	3	
22	Wednesday, August 13, 2014	2.1/8	6.65	1	1	
23	Thursday, August 14, 2014	2.2/7	6.44	1	1	
24	Sunday, August 17, 2014	2.2/7	6.81	1	1	
25	Wednesday, August 20, 2014	2.3/9	6.64	1	1	
26	Thursday, August 21, 2014	2.3/8	6.60 †	1	1	
27	Sunday, August 24, 2014	2.5/8	7.24	1	1	
28	Wednesday, August 27, 2014	2.3/9	6.88	1	1	
29	Thursday, August 28, 2014	2.0/8	5.70	1	1	
30	Sunday, August 31, 2014	2.0/7	5.86	1	1	
31	Wednesday, September 3, 2014	2.3/8	6.55	1	1	
32	Thursday, September 4, 2014	2.2/7	6.45	2	3	
33	Sunday, September 7, 2014	2.4/7	7.07	2	4	
34	Tuesday, September 9, 2014	2.3/8	6.76	1	1	
35	Wednesday, September 10, 2014	2.4/8	6.99 †	1	1	
36^{3}	Sunday, September 14, 2014	2.5/7	7.41 †	1	5	
37	Tuesday, September 16, 2014	2.3/8	6.91 †	1	2	
38	Wednesday, September 17, 2014	2.2/8	6.60	2	2	
39	Friday, September 19, 2014	1.6/7	5.16	1	1	
40	Wednesday, September 24, 2014	2.6/8	6.92	1	3	

- ^Note 1: Episode 18 was delayed to 8:08 pm ET/7:08 pm CT due to CBS coverage of the 2014 WGC-Bridgestone Invitational.
- ^Note 2: Episode 21 was delayed to 10:00 pm ET/9:00 pm CT due to CBS coverage of the 2014 PGA Championship.
- ^Note 3: Episode 36 was delayed to 8:52 pm ET/7:52 pm CT due to CBS coverage of NFL Football.

=== Critical response ===
Big Brother 16 was not known for season-long controversy, but mainly for certain minor events, including Frankie Grande for crass remarks targeting Victoria Rafaeli and Jocasta Odom. As well as Christine Brecht's behavior towards Cody Calafiore despite her being married, and Caleb Reynolds for his comments about President Obama, and his persistent treatment of Amber Borzotra.
