= James Huling =

American reality contestant

- Born: c. 1984 (age 41–42); South Carolina
- Television: Big Brother
- Military career
- Branch: United States Army

James Huling competed on the 17th and 18th seasons of Big Brother. During his time on the show, he was in a "showmance" with Natalie Negrotti. He has worked as a corrections officer. He is a veteran and lives in Texas. In 2020, he ran for mayor of Wichita Falls, coming in third with 13% of the vote.

Huling has also appeared on Catfish: The TV Show.

== See also ==
- List of Big Brother (American TV series) houseguests
