= Magic graph =

A magic graph is a graph whose edges are labelled by the first q positive integers, where q is the number of edges, so that the sum over the edges incident with any vertex is the same, independent of the choice of vertex; or it is a graph that has such a labelling. The name "magic" sometimes means that the integers are any positive integers; then the graph and the labelling using the first q positive integers are called supermagic.

A graph is vertex-magic if its vertices can be labelled so that the sum on any edge is the same. It is total magic if its edges and vertices can be labelled so that the vertex label plus the sum of labels on edges incident with that vertex is a constant.

There are a great many variations on the concept of magic labelling of a graph. There is much variation in terminology as well. The definitions here are perhaps the most common.

Comprehensive references for magic labellings and magic graphs are Gallian (1998), Wallis (2001), and Marr and Wallis (2013).

== Magic squares ==
Euler diagram of properties of some types of 4 × 4 magic squares. Cells of the same colour sum to the magic constant. * In 4 × 4 most-perfect magic squares, any 2 cells that are 2 cells diagonally apart (including wraparound) sum to half the magic constant, hence any 2 such pairs also sum to the magic constant.

A semimagic square is an n × n square with the numbers 1 to n^{2} in its cells, in which the sum of each row and column is the same. A semimagic square is equivalent to a magic labelling of the complete bipartite graph K_{n,n}. The two vertex sets of K_{n,n} correspond to the rows and the columns of the square, respectively, and the label on an edge r_{i}s_{j} is the value in row i, column j of the semimagic square.

The definition of semimagic squares differs from the definition of magic squares in the treatment of the diagonals of the square. Magic squares are required to have diagonals with the same sum as the row and column sums, but for semimagic squares this is not required. Thus, every magic square is semimagic, but not vice versa.
