= Eliza Orlins =

American reality television contestant and lawyer (born 1982)

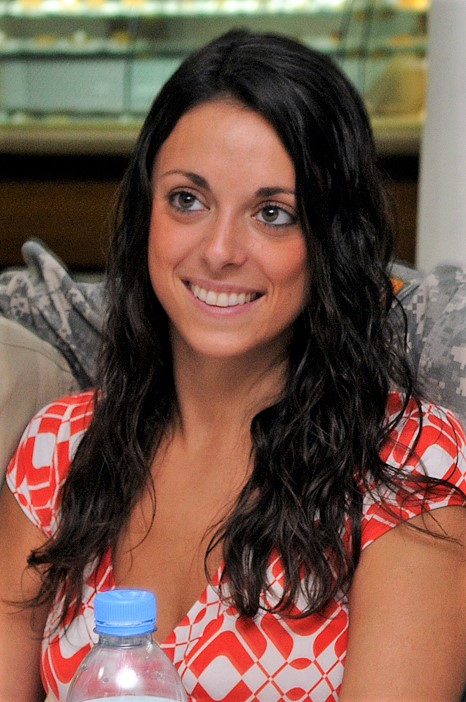
- Orlins on a U.S. military tour in 2008
- Born: December 25, 1982 (age 43); New York City, New York, U.S.
- Education: Syracuse University (BA); Fordham University (JD)
- Political party: Democratic
- Relatives: Stephen Orlins (father)
- Website: Official website

Eliza Orlins (born December 25, 1982) is an American reality television contestant and public defender. She is best known for her appearances on Survivor and The Amazing Race. Orlins is also a public defender with The Legal Aid Society. In 2020, she announced her candidacy for the 2021 New York County District Attorney election; she finished 7th in the Democratic primary.

== Early life ==
Orlins was born in New York City, and grew up between New York and China. She attended Hong Kong International School while in Hong Kong, and Sidwell Friends School after returning to the United States. Orlins graduated summa cum laude from Syracuse University (2005), and cum laude from Fordham University School of Law (2008). She is Jewish, and her grandmother escaped Nazi persecution by fleeing Paris during World War II.

Eliza's father, Stephen Orlins, has served as the president of the National Committee on United States–China Relations since 2005. Eliza's mother, Washington, D.C.–based writer Susan Orlins, appeared on the 11th episode of Survivor: Vanuatu as part of the loved ones visit challenge, which Eliza won. Eliza has two younger sisters, Sabrina and Emily, the former of whom was adopted from Beijing.

== Survivor ==
=== Vanuatu ===
In 2004, Orlins competed on the ninth season of the CBS reality show Survivor, entitled Survivor: Vanuatu. Orlins started the season sorted onto the all-female Yasur tribe. Orlins caught the ire of her alliance when she flipped to vote out an indecisive swing voter in Dolly Neely in the second episode. At the merge, the six remaining female castaways re-aligned, and the group voted out their male competitors until only Chris Daugherty remained. Despite Daugherty losing immunity, Leann Slaby sought to eliminate Orlins. After Daugherty was informed by Julie Berry that he was safe, he successfully worked with Twila Tanner and Scout Cloud Lee to convince Orlins to vote out Slaby. After Ami Cusack was voted out, Orlins re-aligned with Berry due to her dislike of Tanner. Orlins then won immunity, but was unsuccessful in convincing Daugherty, resulting in Berry's elimination. Orlins was then the 15th person voted out the next day during the finale on Day 37, finishing in 4th place.

=== Micronesia ===
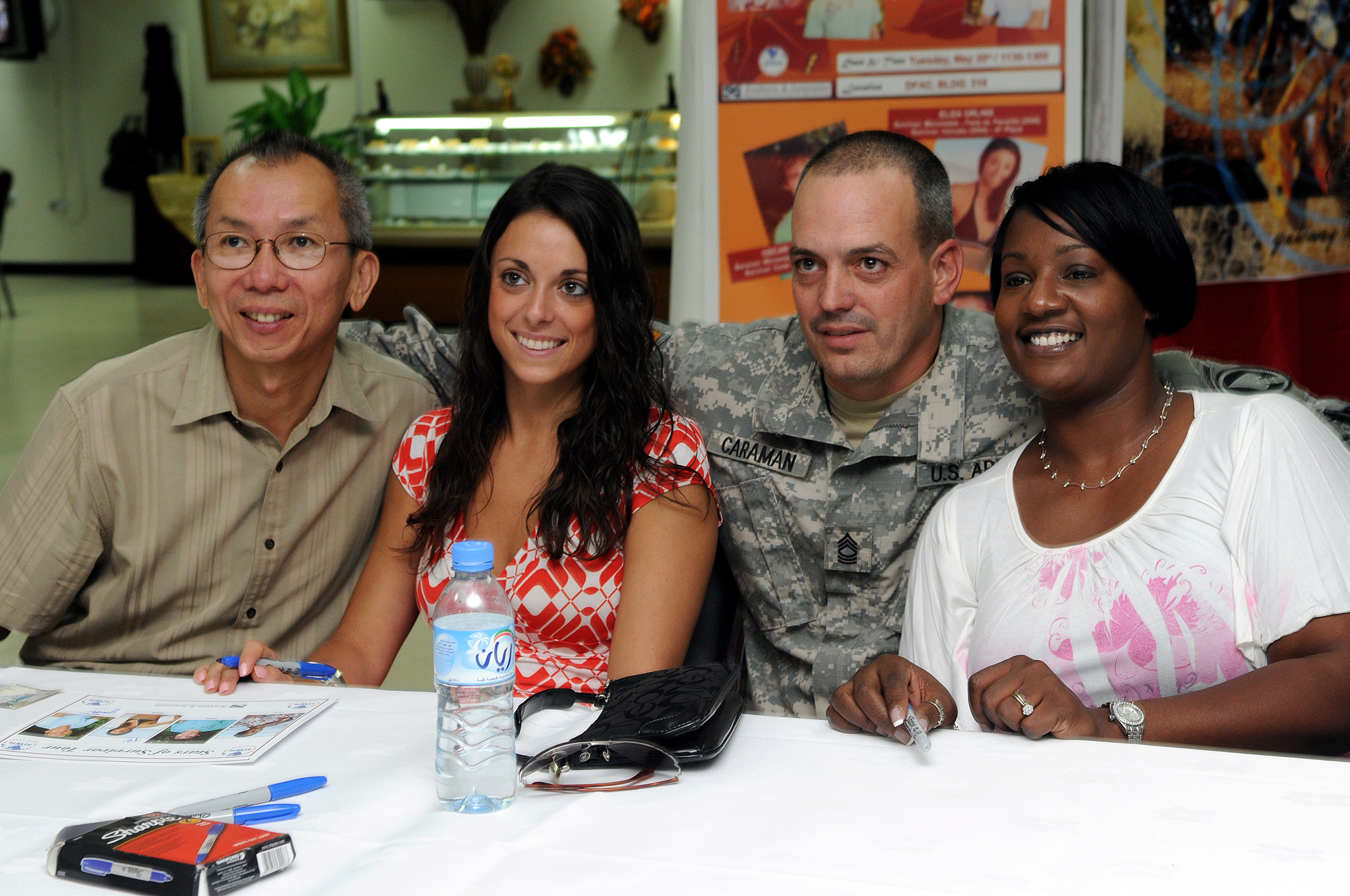
Orlins (second from left) and fellow Survivor: Micronesia castaways Yau-Man Chan (far left) and Cirie Fields (far right) with a fan in 2008

Orlins returned seven seasons later on Survivor: Micronesia. Orlins started the season on the returnee player Malakal tribe. Orlins formed an alliance with Ami Cusack, Yau-Man Chan, and Jonathan Penner. Despite being targeted by an opposing alliance, Orlins survived the first Tribal Council after Jonny Fairplay asked to be voted out to be with his pregnant girlfriend. However, in the following days, all of Orlins's original allies had been eliminated leaving Orlins as the target of Parvati Shallow when the tribes merged in the ninth episode. After Jason Siska won individual immunity, he agreed to give Orlins what he believed to be a hidden immunity idol, which in reality was a stick carved by Ozzy Lusth. Orlins was then eliminated, becoming the first member of the season's jury.

== Other television appearances ==
=== The Amazing Race ===
In 2018, Orlins competed on the thirty-first season of The Amazing Race, which aired in 2019 and featured teams from CBS reality shows Big Brother, Survivor, and The Amazing Race, with fellow Survivor contestant Corinne Kaplan. In the fourth episode Kaplan and Orlins fell behind after Orlins struggled with a task that involved driving a scooter through a driving test course in Ho Chi Minh City. The two finished in last place after checking-in at the finish mat behind Rachel Reilly and Elissa Slater and were eliminated in ninth place.

=== Other appearances ===
Orlins has also appeared on Reality Obsessed, The Dr. Oz Show, and The Beat with Ari Melber.

== Filmography ==
=== Television ===
Year	Title	Role	Notes
2004	Survivor: Vanuatu	Contestant	15th eliminated
2008	Survivor: Micronesia	Contestant	9th eliminated
2019	The Amazing Race 31	Contestant with Corinne Kaplan	3rd eliminated

== Legal career ==
After graduating from law school, Orlins worked as a public defender for The Legal Aid Society. For over a decade, Orlins has represented over 3,000 indigent clients.

=== 2021 Manhattan District Attorney primary ===
On March 5, 2020, Orlins announced her candidacy for the New York County District Attorney Democratic primary to replace incumbent district attorney Cyrus Vance Jr. Orlins finished seventh in the Democratic primary with 4.2% of the vote.
