= Yau-Man Chan =

Malaysian table tennis player, technology executive, and reality television participant

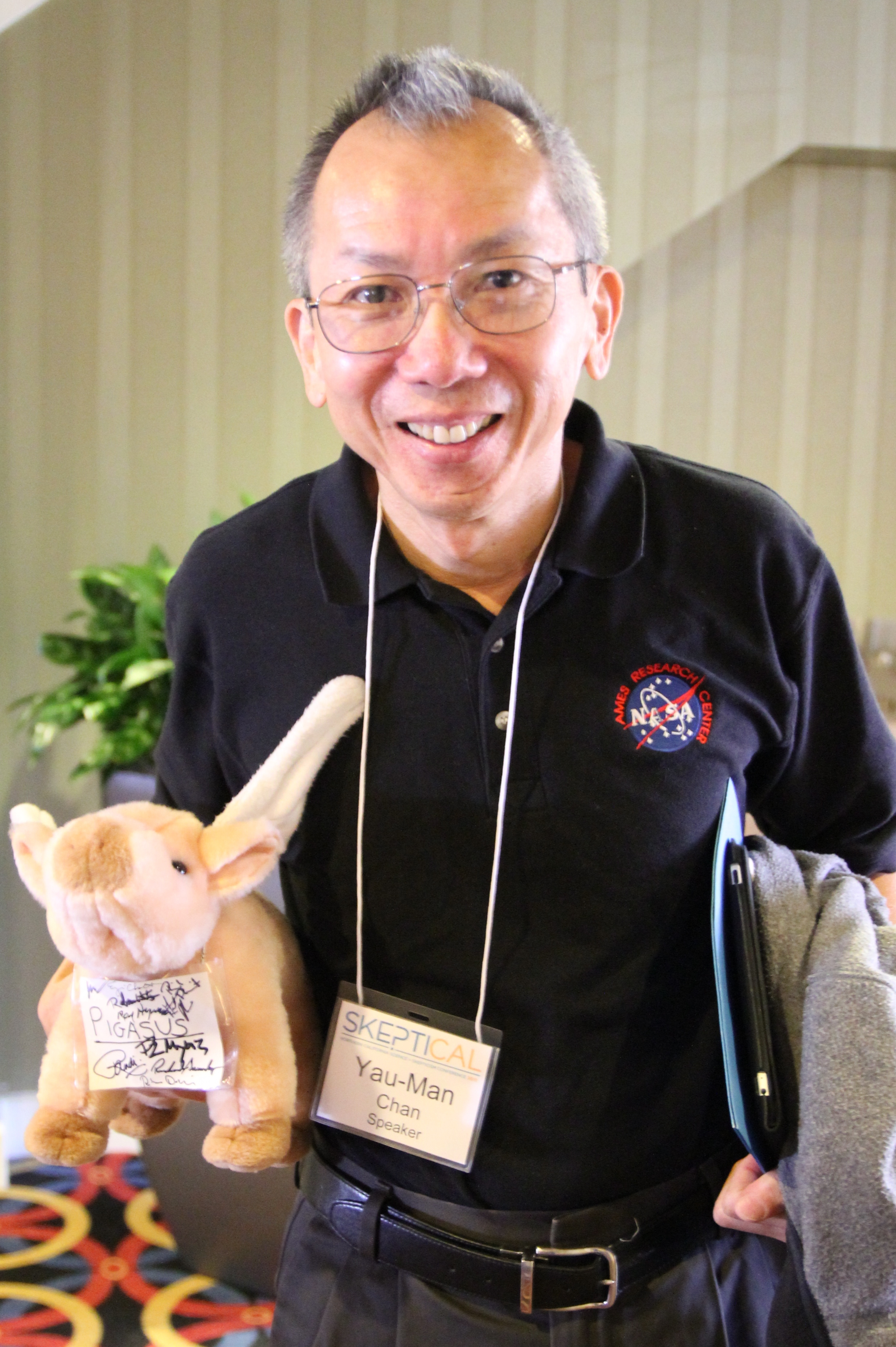
- Chan in 2011
- Born: August 26, 1952 (age 73); Hong Kong
- Education: Massachusetts Institute of Technology (B.S. 1974); University of California, Santa Barbara (M.S. 1977)
- Occupation: Technology executive
- Known for: Reality television contestant
- Television: Survivor: Fiji; Survivor: Micronesia
- Spouse: Jennifer Chan
- Children: 2

Yau-Man Chan (/ˈjaʊ ˌmæn/; born August 26, 1952) is a Malaysian table tennis player, technology executive, and reality television participant. He was the fourth-place finisher in the reality television series Survivor: Fiji. He returned to the show in Survivor: Micronesia, where he was the third contestant to be ousted. He was born in Hong Kong to ethnic Chinese parents and raised in Kota Kinabalu, Malaysia.

He retired from University of California, Berkeley in June 2013. He was the chief technology officer for computing services, network services, and telecommunications at the College of Chemistry. He is also a champion table tennis player. Chan was also the 2005-06 Northern California Division Director for the National Collegiate Table Tennis Association. He has a Bachelor of Science (physics) from MIT and a Masters in scientific instrumentation from UC Santa Barbara in 1977.

On the official Survivor website, Chan was voted the favorite survivor of the Fiji season, with a 65.5% popularity rating. The eventual winner Earl Cole finished second with only 10% of the vote.

== Survivor ==
=== Fiji ===
Chan appeared in the reality television series Survivor: Fiji. He finished fourth and was the last person to be voted out. He appeared on the jury at the end of the season and voted for Earl Cole to win the game and one million dollars.

An atypical Survivor contestant, he achieved much success through his knowledge and utilization of basic physics. This was evident from the first episode. After the repeated efforts of much more muscular contestants, he was the only one to open a box of supplies the tribe received. While others had used various brute force methods to open the box, Chan dropped it on its corner onto a rock, opening it immediately. In this way, he beat younger, fitter, and theoretically stronger players in challenges.

Chan also used his smarts to find the Hidden Immunity Idol. While Cole kept the tribe at bay, Chan found the turtle-shaped idol. Immediately after, he created a false idol and planted it where he found the real idol. This way, if anyone found where the idol was, they would not suspect that he had found it. He constructed the false idol out of half a coconut shell and painted a face on it. He also painted the letters "I.I.," for Immunity Idol.

Chan was part of one of the largest controversies in Survivor history. In a challenge where the reward was a new truck (2008 Ford Super Duty), Chan won, and immediately offered a deal to fellow player Andria "Dreamz" Herd. Chan would give Herd the truck if, in exchange, Herd would promise to give immunity to Chan at the Final Four, thus securing a place for Chan in the Final Three. The deal was contingent on Chan and Herd being in the Final Four and Herd winning individual immunity at that stage of the game.

Herd accepted the deal, and Chan sent himself to Exile Island, the first in Survivor history to do so. During the episode, Chan said in a confessional that it was because fellow castaway Cassandra Franklin would never survive, and there was no one else to send.

After two more people were voted out, the exact conditions of the bargain were set up, with Herd winning immunity in the Final Four. However, Herd reneged on the deal and Chan was voted off. In the reunion after the finale, it was revealed by the members of the jury that Chan might have won with six out of nine votes had he made it to the Final Three. He has stated that he holds no grudge against what Herd did, as it was a risk he took.

=== Micronesia ===
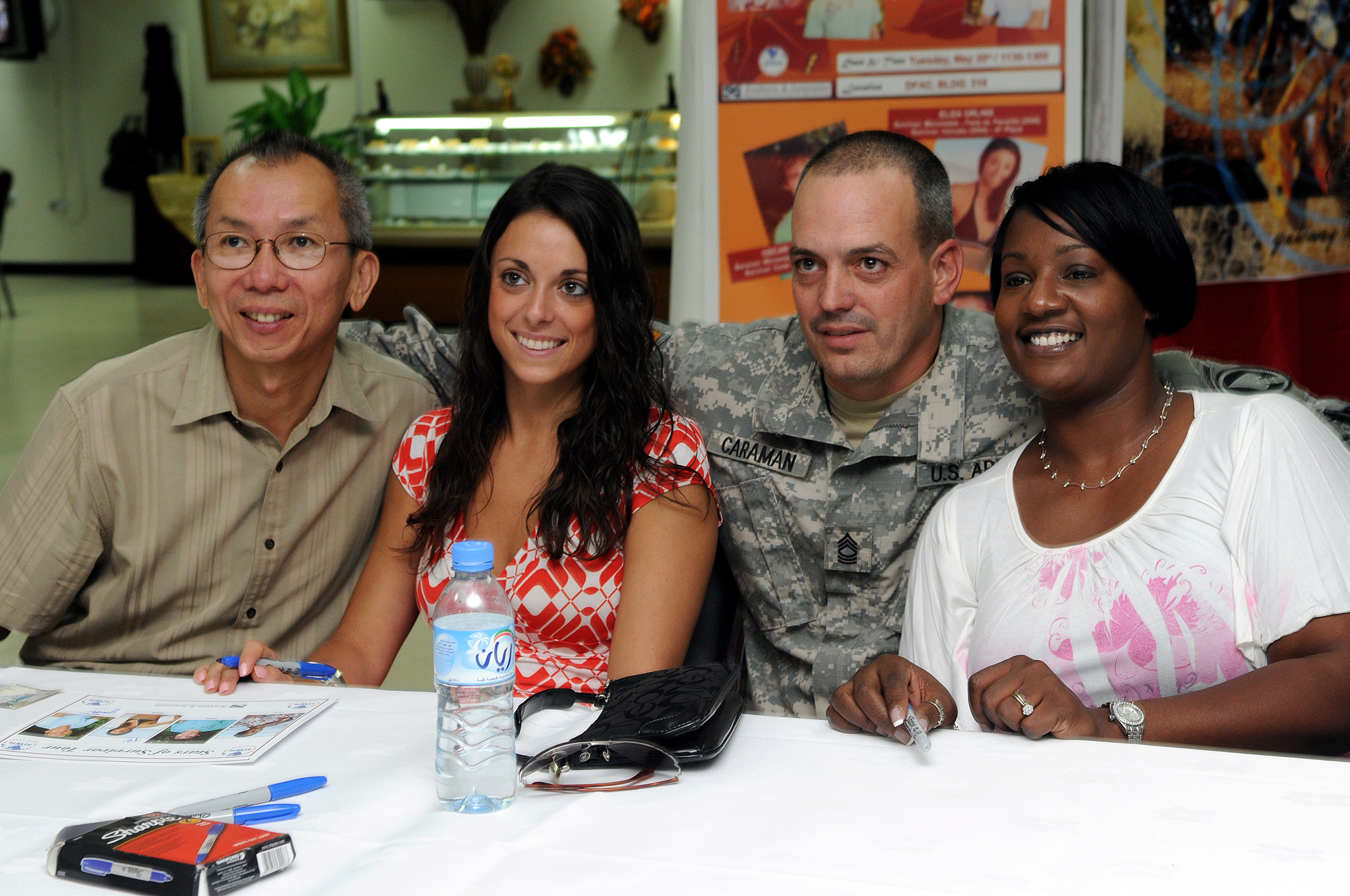
Chan (far left) and fellow Survivor: Micronesia castaways Eliza Orlins (second from left) and Cirie Fields (far right) with a fan in 2008

On January 3, 2008, Chan was announced to be among the Favorites returning for Survivor: Micronesia — Fans vs. Favorites, the 16th season of Survivor which began airing on February 7, 2008. On the first episode of the show, he formed a loose alliance with fellow favorites Jonathan Penner, Ami Cusack, and Eliza Orlins. Chan joined the rest of his tribe in voting Jonny Fairplay off the island during that episode.

As aired in Episode Three, the Favorites lost the immunity challenge. Chan was targeted by Survivor: Panama favorite Cirie Fields, the swing vote for the two alliances (the other consisting of Amanda Kimmel, Ozzy Lusth, Parvati Shallow and James Clement). Fields targeted him because of his reputation as an intelligent player, and she worried what would happen if he found the Hidden Immunity Idol again. Despite Penner's attempts to persuade Fields to join their alliance, Chan was eliminated and became the third person voted off the island by a vote of 6–2–1, despite an effort to target Shallow.

However, additional footage released on the official Survivor website revealed another side to these events. Fields, who was one of the first people to visit Exile Island in this season, had shared all the clues to the location of the Hidden Immunity Idol that she had gathered with Chan, with the understanding that the two of them would share the idol in a similar manner that Chan and Earl Cole did in Survivor: Fiji. After this information exchange, Chan suggested to the tribe that if they won the next reward challenge, instead of following the tribe's earlier procedure of drawing lots to determine which of their own number went to Exile Island, Penner would be sent. Upon hearing this, Fields concluded that Chan had given Penner the clues she had just shared and that the two men were in an alliance that excluded her. That conclusion was another factor in Fields' decision to eliminate Chan. Post-elimination interviews of Penner have told a similar story.

=== Invitation for a third season ===
Chan received an invitation to be a participant of Survivor: Heroes vs. Villains, the 20th season of the show, but had to decline due to an inability to secure sufficient leave from work.

== The Skeptologists and other appearances ==
In April 2008, Chan worked on a pilot for a skeptical reality show called The Skeptologists. The pilot was developed by Brian Dunning (of the Skeptoid podcast) and producer Ryan Johnson (American Dragster). The show was intended to be a reality TV series that would investigate the paranormal and fringe science from a skeptical scientific point of view. Another Skeptologists cast member, Steven Novella, heads the podcast The Skeptics' Guide to the Universe, on which Chan is interviewed in the April 12, 2008 episode.

On May 29, 2011, Chan lectured on "Reality of Reality TV" at the 2nd annual SkeptiCalCon event held in Berkeley, California.

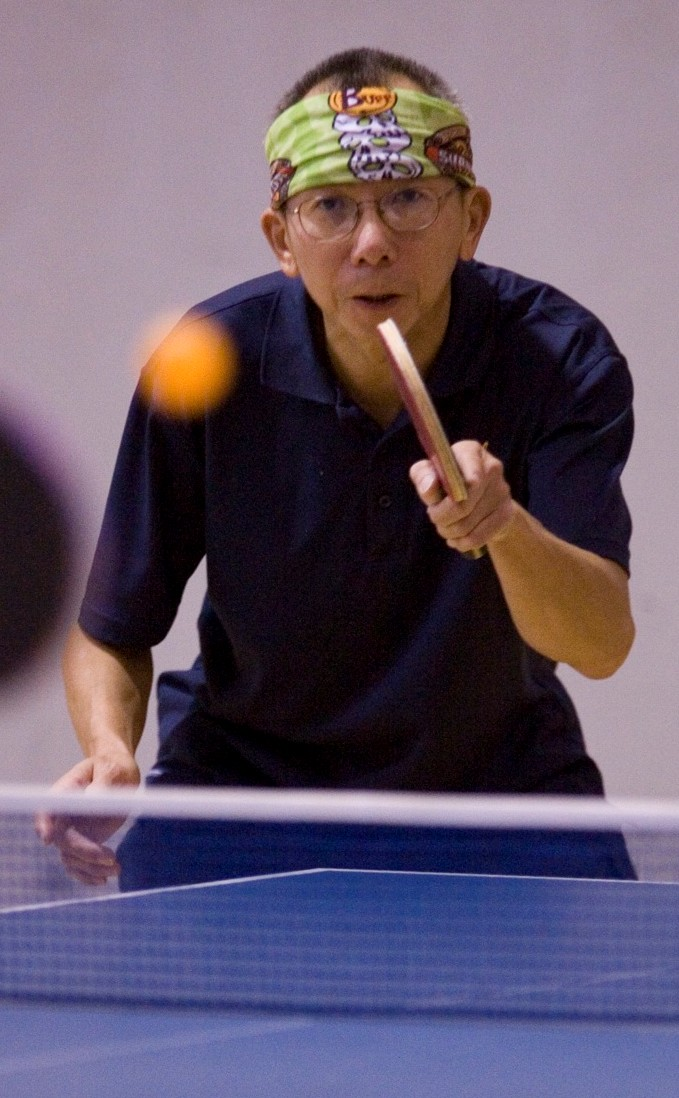
Chan playing table tennis in 2007

== Personal life ==
Chan is married to Jennifer Chan and has two children. He currently resides in Martinez, California. Chan is an atheist.

== Filmography ==
Year	Title	Role	Notes
2007	Survivor: Fiji	Contestant	Eliminated; 4th place
2008	Survivor: Micronesia	Contestant	Eliminated; 18th place
