= Survivor: Micronesia =

- Season 16
- Region 1 DVD cover
- Presented by: Jeff Probst
- No. of days: 39
- No. of castaways: 20
- Winner: Parvati Shallow
- Runner-up: Amanda Kimmel
- Location: Koror, Palau
- Fan Favorite: James Clement
- No. of episodes: 15

Release
- Original network: CBS
- Original release: February 7 – May 11, 2008

Additional information
- Filming dates: October 29 – December 6, 2007

Season chronology
- ← Previous; China Next → Gabon — Earth's Last Eden

Survivor: Micronesia – Fans vs. Favorites (commonly referred to as Survivor: Fans vs. Favorites and/or Survivor: Micronesia) is the sixteenth season of the American CBS competitive reality television series Survivor. It is the show's third season to include contestants from past seasons, after the all-returning contestant pool from Survivor: All-Stars, along with Survivor: Guatemala, in which two contestants from Survivor: Palau returned for a second chance.

In the end, Parvati Shallow defeated fellow Favorite Amanda Kimmel by a vote of 5–3 to become the Sole Survivor. The viewers' favorite contestants, as named on the reunion show, were James Clement, Kimmel and Oscar "Ozzy" Lusth.

== Format ==
Survivor is a reality television show based on the Swedish show Expedition Robinson, created by Mark Burnett and Charlie Parsons. The series follows a number of participants isolated in a remote location, where they must provide food, fire, and shelter. One participant is removed from the series by majority vote every three days, with challenges held to give a reward (ranging from living- and food-related prizes to a car) and immunity from being voted out of the series. The last remaining player receives a prize of $1,000,000.

== Contestants ==
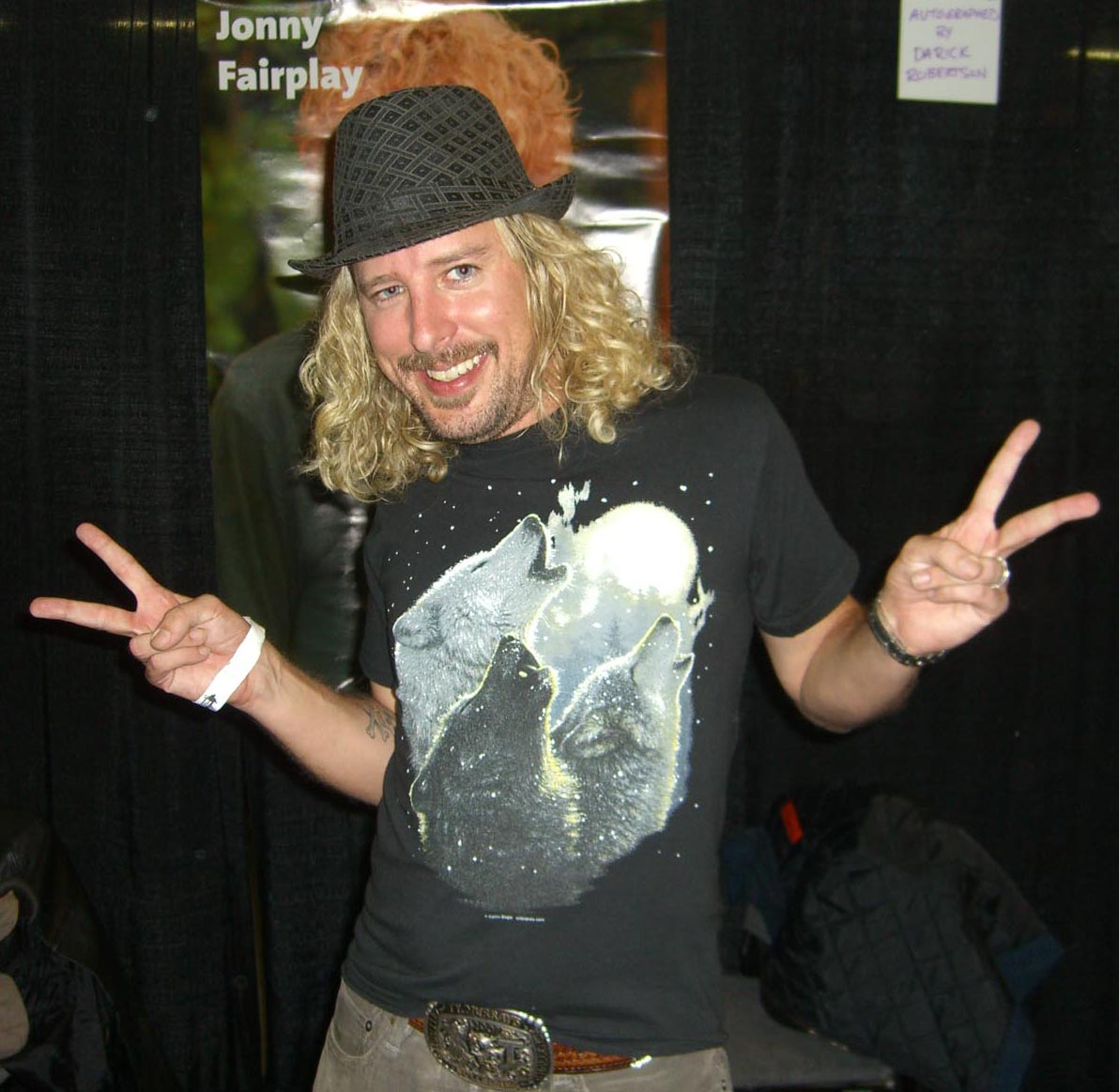
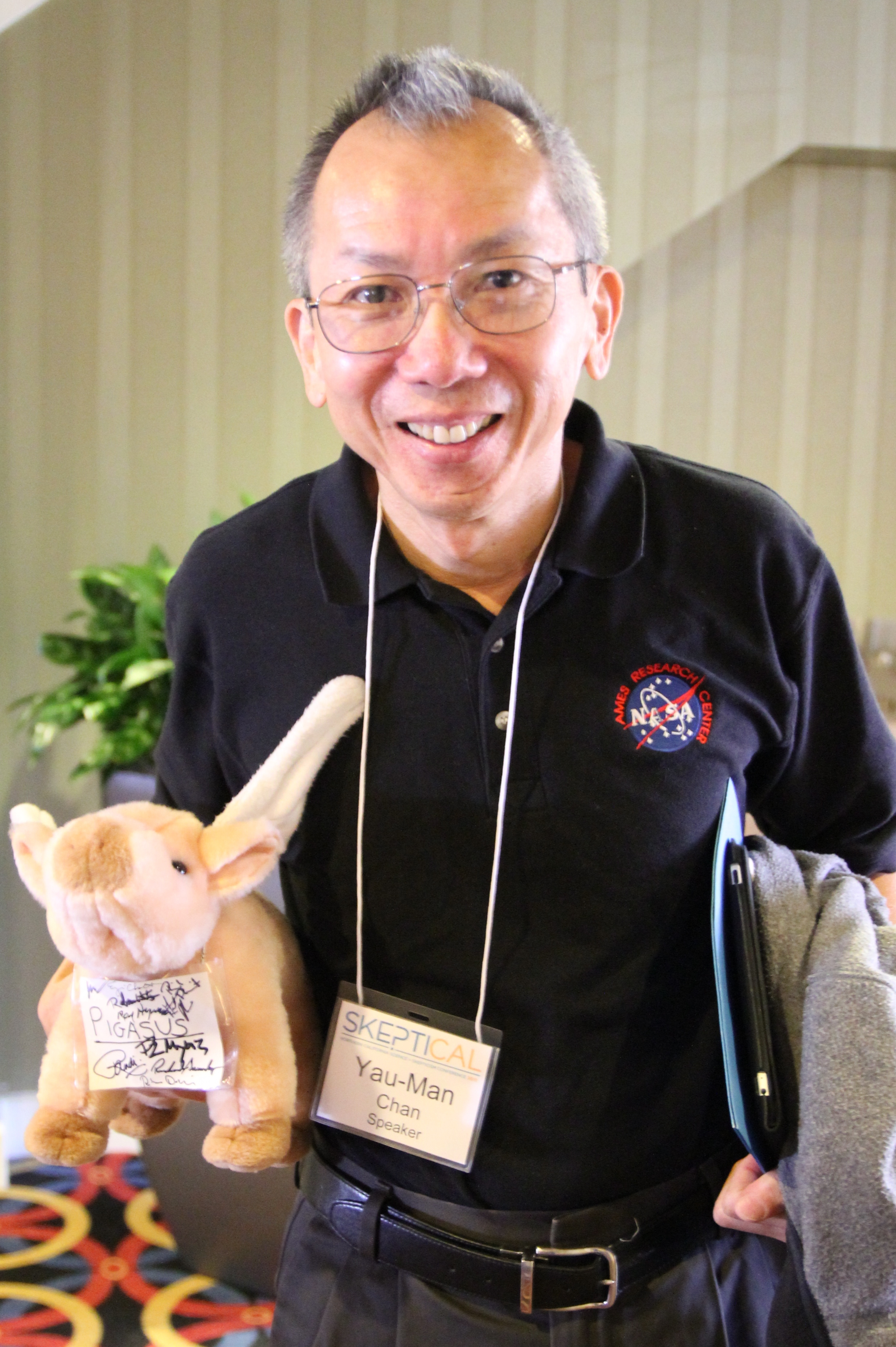
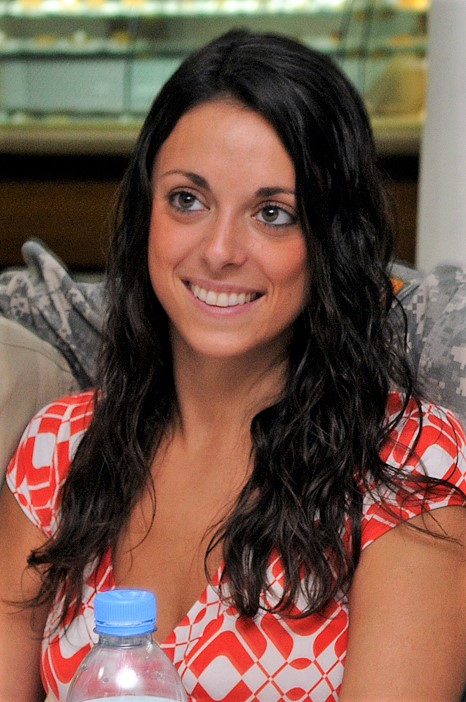
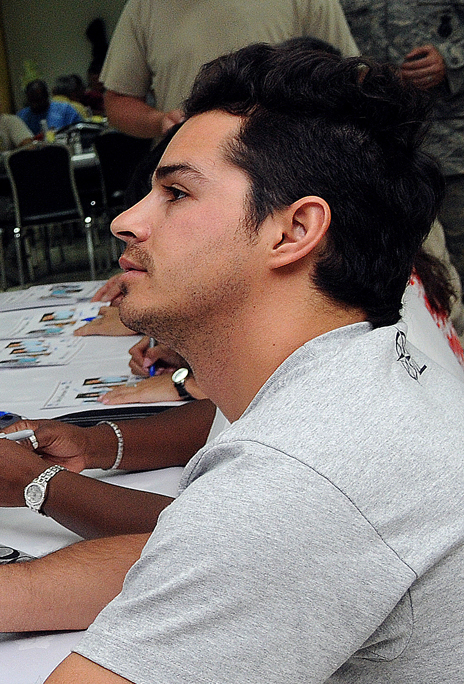
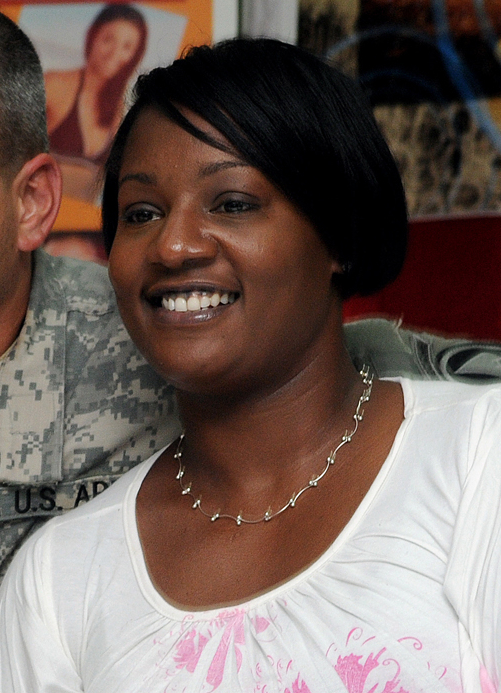
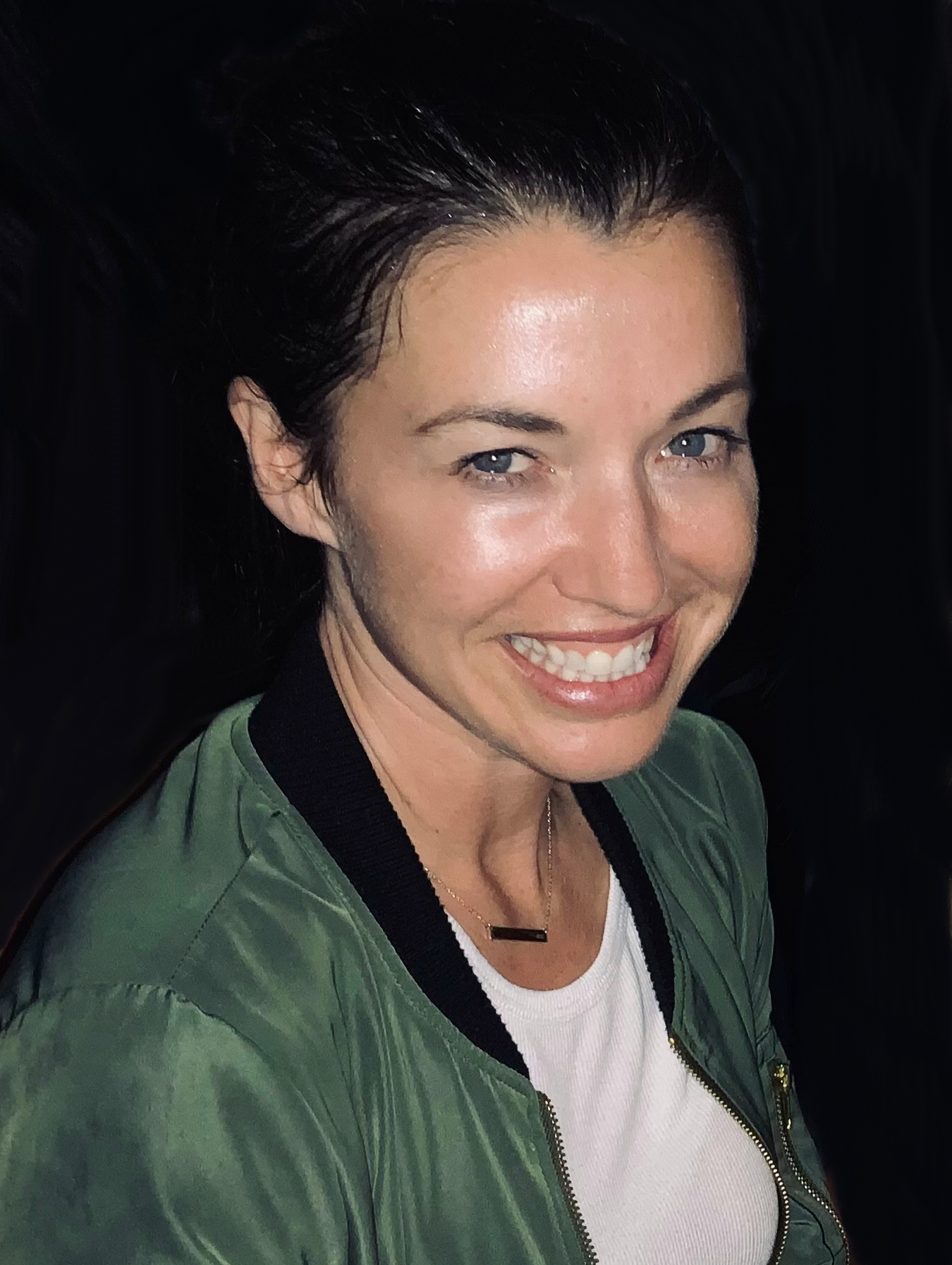
From left to right: Jonny Fairplay, Yau-Man Chan, Eliza Orlins, Ozzy Lusth, Cirie Fields, and Parvati Shallow

The full cast of 20 contestants was revealed on January 3, 2008, by Entertainment Weekly. The contestants included ten new players, the Fans, and ten former players, the Favorites, from six previous seasons returning for their second chance at the game. The Fans were initially on the Airai tribe, with the Favorites on Malakal; both tribes were named after locations in Palau. The merged tribe was named Dabu by contestant Erik Reichenbach, who falsely claimed it to mean "good" in Micronesian.

List of Survivor: Micronesia – Fans vs. Favorites contestants
Contestant	Age	From	Tribe			Finish	
Contestant	Age	From	Original	Switched	Merged	Placement	Day
Jonny Fairplay Pearl Islands	33	Los Angeles, California	Malakal			1st voted out	Day 3
Mary Sartain	29	Emeryville, California	Airai			2nd voted out	Day 6
Yau-Man Chan Fiji	55	Martinez, California	Malakal			3rd voted out	Day 8
Michael "Mikey B" Bortone	34	Los Angeles, California	Airai			4th voted out	Day 11
Joel Anderson	32	Avondale, Arizona	Airai	Malakal		5th voted out	Day 14
Jonathan Penner Cook Islands	45	Los Angeles, California	Malakal	Airai		Medically evacuated	Day 15
Chet Welch	48	Ford City, Pennsylvania	Airai	Malakal		6th voted out	Day 17
Kathleen "Kathy" Sleckman	45	Glen Ellyn, Illinois	Airai	Airai		Quit	Day 19
Tracy Hughes-Wolf	43	Fredericksburg, Virginia	Airai	Malakal		7th voted out	Day 20
Ami Cusack Vanuatu	34	Golden, Colorado	Malakal	Malakal		8th voted out	Day 21
Eliza Orlins Vanuatu	25	Manhattan, New York	Malakal	Airai	Dabu	9th voted out 1st jury member	Day 24
Oscar "Ozzy" Lusth Cook Islands	26	Venice, California	Malakal	Malakal	Dabu	10th voted out 2nd jury member	Day 27
Jason Siska	22	Fox River Grove, Illinois	Airai	Airai	Dabu	11th voted out 3rd jury member	Day 30
James Clement China	30	Lafayette, Louisiana	Malakal	Airai	Dabu	Medically evacuated 4th jury member	Day 31
Alexis Jones	24	Beverly Hills, California	Airai	Airai	Dabu	12th voted out 5th jury member	Day 33
Erik Reichenbach	22	Ypsilanti, Michigan	Airai	Malakal	Dabu	13th voted out 6th jury member	Day 36
Natalie Bolton	32	West Hollywood, California	Airai	Airai	Dabu	14th voted out 7th jury member	Day 37
Cirie Fields Panama	37	Norwalk, Connecticut	Malakal	Malakal	Dabu	15th voted out 8th jury member	Day 38
Amanda Kimmel China	23	Los Angeles, California	Malakal	Malakal	Dabu	Runner-up	Day 39
Parvati Shallow Cook Islands	25	Los Angeles, California	Malakal	Airai	Dabu	Sole Survivor	Day 39

=== Future appearances ===
Parvati Shallow, Amanda Kimmel, James Clement and Cirie Fields returned to play Survivor for a third time in Survivor: Heroes vs. Villains. Ozzy Lusth returned to play a third time on Survivor: South Pacific. Both Fields and Lusth also returned for their fourth time each on Survivor: Game Changers. Jonathan Penner returned for his third time on Survivor: Philippines. Erik Reichenbach is at this time the only Fan returning as he was a Favorite in the second "Fans vs. Favorites" season, Survivor: Caramoan. Shallow later returned to compete on Survivor: Winners at War. Fields and Shallow represented USA on Australian Survivor: Australia V The World in 2025, with Shallow winning the season. Fields and Lusth returned to compete on Survivor 50: In the Hands of the Fans.

Outside of Survivor, Lusth competed on the second season of American Ninja Warrior. Eliza Orlins competed in The Amazing Race 31 alongside two-time Survivor contestant Corinne Kaplan. Fields was a contestant on the USA Network reality competition series Snake in the Grass. Fields also competed on the first season of the Peacock reality TV series The Traitors. Later, Fields competed on Big Brother 25. In 2023, Fairplay competed on the first season of House of Villains. In 2024, Shallow competed on the second season of The Traitors. In 2025, Shallow competed on the second season of Deal or No Deal Island.

== Season summary ==
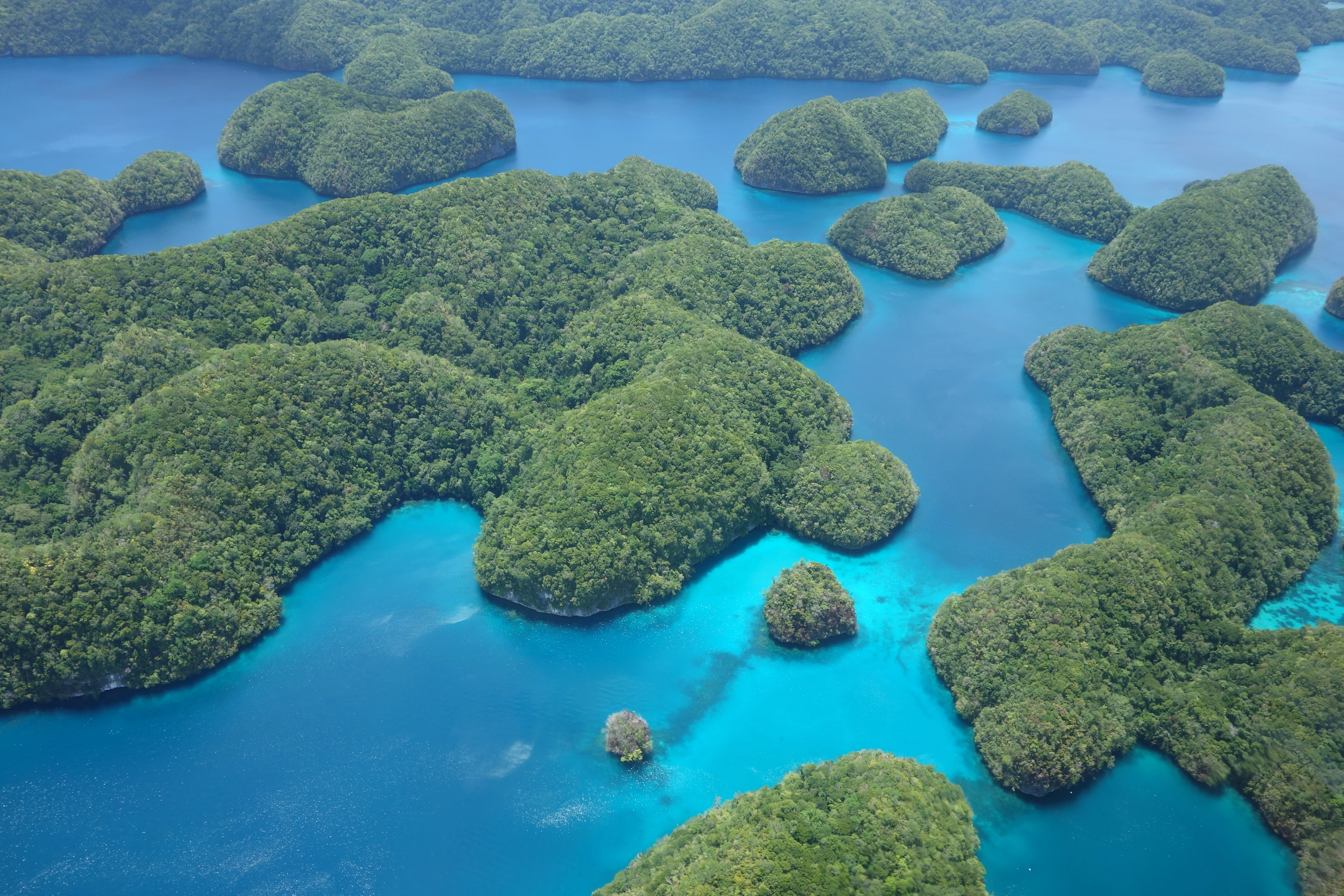
The season was filmed on the island of Koror in Palau.

This season pitted a tribe of "Favorites", ten returning Survivor contestants, against a tribe of "Fans", ten new players. The Favorites tribe was run by a majority alliance of Amanda, Cirie, Parvati, James, and Ozzy, while the Fans failed to form consistent alliances. After four eliminations, with the tribes still at equal numbers, the tribes were swapped through a schoolyard pick. On Malakal, the majority of the Favorites worked to eliminate the Fans, who continued to succumb to infighting. On Airai, Jonathan was medically evacuated on Day 15 and Kathy quit the game on Day 19. Just before the merge, Malakal lost their forth straight immunity challenge and Ami, a Favorite, was voted out over Erik, a Fan, after the majority Favorite alliance considered Ami to be disloyal.

After the merge, the remaining Fans attempted to form alliances with the Favorites that held the majority. An all female alliance led by Parvati included Amanda and Cirie and female Fans Natalie and Alexis to blindside several male threats. Parvati’s alliance worked covertly to avoid suspicion and advanced to the final six with Erik, who had been safeguarded by repeated immunity challenge wins. Amanda was targeted for being a threat after Erik won immunity again; she saved herself with a hidden immunity idol and Alexis was eliminated. Erik won individual immunity yet again, but the others, led by Cirie, convinced him he was safe regardless; he gave the individual immunity necklace to Natalie in an attempt to gain her trust, and the women promptly voted him off.

Amanda, Cirie and Parvati achieved their goal of becoming the final three, but were surprised by one last immunity challenge and elimination; Amanda won the challenge and eliminated Cirie, who she perceived to be the greater threat to win. The jury intensely questioned both finalists and awarded Parvati the victory in a 5–3 decision.

Challenge winners and eliminations by episode
Episode			Challenge winner(s)		Exile Island	Eliminated	
No.	Title	Original air date	Reward	Immunity	Exile Island	Tribe	Player
1	"You Guys Are Dumber Than You Look"	February 7, 2008		Yau-Man (Note: In the initial challenge of the season, one player per tribe each received immunity at their first Tribal Council.) (Malakal)	None	Malakal	Jonny Fairplay
1	"You Guys Are Dumber Than You Look"	February 7, 2008	Airai		None	Malakal	Jonny Fairplay
2	"The Sounds of Jungle Love"	February 14, 2008	Malakal		Cirie (Malakal)	Airai	Mary
2	"The Sounds of Jungle Love"	February 14, 2008		Kathy (Airai)	Kathy (Airai)	Airai	Mary
3	"I Should Be Carried on the Chariot-Type Thing!"	February 21, 2008	Malakal	Airai	Ami (Malakal)	Malakal	Yau-Man
3	"I Should Be Carried on the Chariot-Type Thing!"	February 21, 2008	Malakal	Airai	Kathy (Airai)	Malakal	Yau-Man
4	"That's Baked, Barbecued and Fried!"	February 28, 2008	Malakal	Malakal	Kathy (Airai)	Airai	Mikey B
4	"That's Baked, Barbecued and Fried!"	February 28, 2008	Malakal	Malakal	Ozzy (Malakal)	Airai	Mikey B
5	"He's a Ball of Goo!"	March 6, 2008	Airai	Airai	None (Note: There was no exile due to a tribe switch.)	Malakal	Joel
6	"It Hit Everyone Pretty Hard"	March 13, 2008	Airai	Airai	Chet (Malakal)	Airai	Jonathan
6	"It Hit Everyone Pretty Hard"	March 13, 2008	Airai	Airai	Jason (Airai)	Malakal	Chet
7	"Like a Wide-Eyed Kid in the Candy Store"	March 19, 2008	Malakal	Airai	Jason (Airai)	Airai	Kathy
7	"Like a Wide-Eyed Kid in the Candy Store"	March 19, 2008	Malakal	Airai	Tracy (Malakal)	Malakal	Tracy
8	"A Lost Puppy Dog"	April 3, 2008	Airai		Alexis (Note: Prior to the challenge, Alexis and Ozzy were exiled and each received individual immunity for the upcoming Tribal Council should their tribe lose the challenge.) (Airai)	Malakal	Ami
8	"A Lost Puppy Dog"	April 3, 2008		Ozzy (Malakal)	Ozzy (Malakal)	Malakal	Ami
9	"I'm in Such a Hot Pickle!"	April 10, 2008	None (Note: There was no reward or exile due to the merge.)	Jason	None	Dabu	Eliza
10	"I Promise..."	April 17, 2008	Amanda, Erik, Jason, Ozzy	Parvati	Cirie	Dabu	Ozzy
11	"I'm Ruthless... and Have a Smile on My Face"	April 24, 2008	Survivor Auction	Erik	Jason	Dabu	Jason
12	"I'm Gonna Fix Her!"	May 1, 2008	Alexis [Cirie, Natalie]	Erik	Amanda	Dabu	James
12	"I'm Gonna Fix Her!"	May 1, 2008	Alexis [Cirie, Natalie]	Erik	Amanda	Dabu	Alexis
13	"If It Smells Like a Rat, Give It Cheese"	May 8, 2008	Erik [Amanda]	~~Erik~~ (Natalie) (Note: At Tribal Council, Erik chose to give his immunity to Natalie.)	Parvati	Dabu	Erik
14	"Stir the Pot!"	May 11, 2008	None	Amanda	None	Dabu	Natalie
14	"Stir the Pot!"	May 11, 2008	None	Amanda	None	Dabu	Cirie
15	"The Reunion"	May 11, 2008					

In the case of multiple tribes or castaways who win a reward or immunity, they are listed in order of finish, or alphabetically where it was a team effort; where one castaway won and invited others, the invitees are in brackets.

== Episodes ==
No. overall	No. in season	Title	Rating/share (household)	Rating/share (18-49)	Original release date	U.S. viewers (millions)	Weekly rank
230	1	"You Guys Are Dumber Than You Look"	8.1/13	4.8/13	February 7, 2008	14.02	8
Ten fans arrived on a tropical island and learned that they would compete against ten returning players. The contestants swam to an island and searched for individual immunity idols which can only be used at their tribe's first Tribal Council. Jonny Fairplay found the idols tied to each tribe's boat, but took the one belonging to the Airai tribe. Yau-Man noticed and grabbed the Malakal idol, then showed the fan's idol to Kathy, who took it. At the Malakal camp, alliances formed of Ami, Eliza, Jonathan and Yau-Man and of the James-Parvati and Amanda-Ozzy couples; these groups courted Fairplay, who played both sides. A combined reward and immunity challenge required building a cart from puzzle pieces and pushing it through an obstacle course, then using the puzzle pieces to complete a mechanism and set fire to a platform. Airai took an early lead and won immunity and a flint, sending the Favorites to Tribal Council. Afterwards, Jonny Fairplay told Malakal that he missed his girlfriend and daughter and wasn't committed to the game. The truth of this was questioned and he was unanimously voted out. After the tribal council, Malakal were given flint, though Yau-Man had already made fire by focusing sunlight.
231	2	"The Sounds of Jungle Love"	7.6/12	4.5/13	February 14, 2008	13.12	6
Airai struggled to make camp. Chet, Kathy and Tracy felt shunned by their younger tribemates and built their own shelter, then a second was built for the other tribe members. At Malakal, the Amanda-Ozzy and Parvati-James couples grew closer, to the concern of Jonathan and Cirie. A combined reward and immunity challenge had five contestants complete laps of an amphibious obstacle course, a sixth unlock a box, and three others solve a puzzle. Chet struggled to retrieve a key in the water and Malakal won by a large margin, receiving immunity, fishing gear, and a bamboo fishing boat. Malakal chose to send Kathy to Exile Island, then had to send one of their own and Cirie volunteered. Kathy and Cirie discovered a series of clues but failed to find a hidden immunity idol. At Airai, Mikey B wanted to vote out Chet due to his challenge performance, and devised a way to split his alliance's seven votes between Chet and Tracy to protect against an idol. Joel did not like Mikey B controlling the vote and plotted with Erik, Alexis, Natalie, Chet, Tracy and Kathy to undermine Mikey B's position by voting out his close ally, Mary.
232	3	"I Should Be Carried on the Chariot-Type Thing!"	7.3/11	4.0/10	February 21, 2008	12.55	8
Mikey B confronted Joel about voting out Mary. A reward challenge had contestants try to move to their end of a playing field with their tribe's three bags and two of the opposing tribe's bags. In a very physical contest in the rain, Malakal won and chose their reward of a tarp, a lighting kit, and a survival kit. Kathy and Ami were sent to Exile Island, where they competed in searching for the hidden idol. Cirie contemplated which alliance to join and struck a final-three deal with Amanda and Parvati. The immunity challenge required two men and two women from each tribe to support a net into which members of the opposing tribe tossed coconuts. Airai outlasted Malakal and won tribal immunity. The Malakal alliances openly lobbied for Cirie's vote. Amanda, Ozzy, Parvati, and James wanted to vote out Eliza – having earlier failed to bring her into their alliance – but followed Cirie's lead and voted out Yau-Man due to her concern that he would find the hidden immunity idol.
233	4	"That's Baked, Barbecued and Fried!"	7.5/12	4.2/11	February 28, 2008	12.47	10
Chet irritated his tribemates with his lack of work at camp. Eliza felt sick and James criticized his alliance's decision to not vote her out, believing she was weak. The reward challenge required diving for coconuts and bringing them to shore where tribemates would unscramble a word puzzle. Ozzy facilitated the diving task for his tribemates and Malakal won three chicken hens, a rooster, and chicken feed. Kathy and Ozzy were exiled, and Kathy felt disheartened and did not search for the idol. Under the pretense of looking for food, Ozzy searched and found the idol without Kathy's knowledge and put a fake idol in its place. At Malakal, Eliza talked with Parvati about voting out Jonathan, but he overheard them. The immunity challenge harnessed six tribemembers to a hub which they had to unlock and maneuver through a forest course, collecting puzzle necklaces which two tribemates would use to decipher a three-word phrase. Airai struggled to work together and Malakal won by a large margin. Mikey B feigned loyalty to Joel but lobbied to vote out Chet. Tracy approached Joel with a plan to vote out Mikey B, which worked.
234	5	"He's a Ball of Goo!"	7.3/11	4.0/10	March 6, 2008	12.06	8
Ozzy told Amanda, James and Parvati that he found the immunity idol. The tribes were switched by a schoolyard pick: the new Airai tribe was composed of Alexis, Eliza, James, Jason, Jonathan, Kathy, Natalie, and Parvati; Amanda, Ami, Chet, Cirie, Erik, Joel, Ozzy, and Tracy made up the new Malakal tribe. The challenge harnessed pairs of tribemates in an obstacle course, with a point scored for the pursuing pair taking a flag from the defenders or for the defenders evading the pursuers for one minute. Airai won a food reward and no one was exiled. Several were injured and Jonathan received medical attention for a puncture wound to the knee. On day 14, the Favorites took charge at Airai and built a new camp and shelter further inland. The immunity challenge had contestants throw rocks at tiles, then a caller instructed others to solve a puzzle. Airai initially fell behind but worked quickly on the puzzle and won immunity. At Malakal, Joel and Erik approached the Favorites about voting out physically weaker tribemates Chet, Cirie, and Tracy. Cirie overheard, worked with Chet and Tracy to target Joel, and convinced Amanda and Ozzy that Joel was a bigger long-term threat.
235	6	"It Hit Everyone Pretty Hard"	7.9/13	4.2/13	March 13, 2008	13.06	3
The reward challenge had tribes race to make an opening in a blockade of tied planks and sticks created by the opposing tribe and get all their tribe members through it. Airai won a reward visit from two Micronesians who demonstrated ways to catch seafood and improve camp. Chet and Jason were exiled and Jason found Ozzy's fake idol. Jonathan was medevaced for his infected knee. At Malakal, Amy proposed an alliance to Erik and Tracy, as she distrusted Cirie. The immunity challenge required contestants to use stepping poles to transfer two tribemates across platforms over the water and then get all seven members on or above a small platform on a tower. Airai won by carrying both Parvati and Eliza on a single pole rather than using both poles. At Malakal, Chet asked to be voted out because he had given up and had an injured foot, though Erik and Tracy wanted him to vote with them against Ozzy. Chet is voted out.
236	7	"Like a Wide-Eyed Kid in the Candy Store"	6.7/11	3.7/10	March 19, 2008	11.34	6
Ozzy's de facto leadership and arrogance during a fishing expedition upset the Malakal women. On the reward challenge, two callers directed four blindfolded tribemates to push a large money stone through a forest course. Eight smaller money stones gathered along the way were then used to solve a puzzle. Malakal won and received a reward trip to a spa and food. Jason and Tracy were exiled. Demoralized by poor living conditions and missing her family, Kathy quit the game. The immunity challenge required a tribemember to race along a floating bridge with a rope for each of five bundles of large puzzle pieces, which were winched ashore by tribemates. Two remaining tribemates then solved the puzzle. Ozzy and Erik provided Malakal with a large lead, but Eliza and Jason quickly assembled Airai's puzzle for the tribe's third consecutive immunity win. Ami attempted to blindside Ozzy, lobbying Amanda and Cirie to blindside Ozzy's ally Erik while working with Tracy and Erik to vote Ozzy out 3–2–1. However, the plot collapsed at tribal council as Amanda and Cirie did not wish to lose Ozzy's trust, and Erik joined with the Favorites to eliminate Tracy.
237	8	"A Lost Puppy Dog"	7.5/12	3.8/9	April 3, 2008	12.84	11
Ozzy felt concerned that he was seen as a leader and became unsure of Ami's loyalty. Parvati proposed an alliance with James, Natalie and Alexis to get them to the merge, and offered the women a final four alliance with herself and Amanda. Before a combined reward and immunity challenge, Ozzy and Alexis were chosen by their tribes for immediate exile. The challenge required individual tribe members to maneuver through a balancing obstacle course while two members of the opposing tribe tried to knock them down with weighted bags. In a close challenge, Airai completed five laps first and won tribal immunity plus a reward of pizza and beer at camp. On Exile Island, Ozzy pretended to look for the hidden immunity idol with Alexis to conceal the fact that he had already obtained it. Ozzy also noticed that the fake idol he made had already been found. At Malakal, Erik told Amanda and Cirie about Ami's attempt to blindside Ozzy, but they understood her motivation and accepted her allegiance. Once Ozzy returned from Exile Island, Erik told him the same story. Although Amanda and Cirie thought Erik was dangerous, Ozzy was upset that Ami plotted against him. Ami tried to counter Erik's story at Tribal Council but was voted out.
238	9	"I'm in Such a Hot Pickle!"	6.9/11	3.8/11	April 10, 2008	11.68	17
Eliza formed an alliance with Jason, who told her that he had the hidden immunity idol, not realizing that it was a fake. On day 22, Airai and Malakal merged and received a feast. They decided to live at the Malakal campsite and chose to name the new tribe Dabu, which Erik said meant "good" in Micronesian, but it was just something funny-sounding that he invented. Amanda became concerned about Alexis's attachment to Ozzy and upset when Parvati revealed that she had committed them to a final four alliance with Alexis and Natalie. An individual immunity challenge had each contestant positioned under a metal grate while the tide rose, reducing their breathing space. Jason lasted the longest and won immunity. He gave Eliza the immunity idol he found, but she immediately recognized it as a fake (describing it as "just a f**** stick"). At Tribal Council, after the votes were cast, Eliza tried to play it. Jeff declared the idol a fake and burned it in the fire pit, and Eliza declared that Ozzy must then have the real hidden immunity idol, which he admitted. The votes were then tallied and Eliza became the first member of the jury.
239	10	"I Promise..."	7.4/13	3.8/12	April 17, 2008	12.09	11
A schoolyard pick divided the contestants into two teams of four for the reward challenge, with Cirie unchosen and immediately exiled. One at a time, teammates swam, crawled and climbed through an obstacle course, and collectively had to reproduce a sequence of Micronesian symbols. The team of Amanda, Erik, Jason and Ozzy won an overnight reward trip to Yap for a feast and cultural observance. The immunity challenge had contestants balance on a log with a raised hand tethered to an unsecured water bucket above them. Erik, Cirie, Alexis and Ozzy forfeited for offered sweets, while others lost concentration. After more than six hours, Jeff offered a tray of food for either of the last two – Jason or Parvati – to step down. Parvati suggested that Jason could gain goodwill by sharing the food. Jason asked for and received a guarantee from everyone that he would not be voted out at the next Tribal Council, and forfeited. At camp, Amanda, James and Ozzy immediately wanted to renege on their promise to Jason. Cirie approached Alexis, Jason, Natalie and Parvati about blindsiding Ozzy. At Tribal Council, Ozzy stated that he left his idol back at camp, and he was voted out.
240	11	"I'm Ruthless... and Have a Smile on My Face"	7.9/13	4.2/13	April 24, 2008	12.98	12
After blindsiding Ozzy and their final four alliance, Parvati tried to repair her relationships with Amanda and James. Both distrusted her, but Amanda played along because the women comprised a majority. An opportunity for rewards was provided through an auction. Natalie won the power to immediately exile a tribemate and chose Jason, who found a new hidden immunity idol. The women planned to blindside Jason; Natalie misdirected him by telling him to make sure James didn't win immunity so that they could vote him out. The immunity challenge had a series of elimination stages: throwing rocks to break tiles, digging for a key and solving a puzzle wheel to turn a mechanism, and racing through a suspended obstacle course. Erik won immunity (on what happened to be his 22nd birthday). The women searched through Jason's bag, to the disapproval of James and Erik, and found his hidden immunity idol. Natalie reaffirmed to Jason that the women would be voting for James. Jason did not play his idol and was voted out.
241	12	"I'm Gonna Fix Her!"	7.7/13	4.0/12	May 1, 2008	12.53	14
Contestants' loved ones visited during the reward challenge, which had contestants guess how the majority of the tribe had responded on a survey about each other. Each correct answer allowed them to chop a competitor's rope; three chopped ropes eliminated a contestant. Alexis won a trip to Jellyfish Lake to swim among stingless jellyfish with a loved one; she chose Cirie and Natalie to join her, along with their loved ones. James was evacuated from the game due to the surgery needed to cure his infected finger. Amanda volunteered to be exiled and learned that the idol was under the tribe's flag. The immunity challenge had contestants take turns shooting at colored sake bottles. Erik's sharpshooting allowed him to break three bottles of his assigned color and win. Amanda told the tribe that she had not found the idol; later, with Parvati's help, she secretly retrieved it. The others wanted to vote Amanda out, worried that she was a jury threat. Everyone was surprised when James appeared in the Tribal Council jury with an IV drip. Alexis, Cirie, Erik and Natalie openly declared that they would vote for Amanda. After the votes were cast, Amanda played her idol and Alexis was eliminated with two votes.
242	13	"If It Smells Like a Rat, Give It Cheese"	7.7/13	4.1/12	May 8, 2008	11.98	9
Erik and Natalie decided that one of them had to win the reward challenge and exile the other in order to find the immunity idol. Amanda, Cirie and Parvati reconfirmed their final three alliance and plotted for Amanda to convince Erik that he should partner with Parvati since they were the strongest at challenges. The reward challenge tested the contestants on past seasons of the show. Erik was the first to correctly answer four questions and won a helicopter trip over the Rock Islands and an overnight stay at a resort. Erik brought Amanda with him and exiled Parvati. Natalie felt betrayed and vented her feelings to Cirie. The immunity challenge had contestants retrieve an assigned color of puzzle pieces from three large sand pits, using intersecting ropes to determine the location to dig. Erik assembled his puzzle and won his third consecutive immunity. Erik tried to make a final three alliance with Cirie and Parvati, but Natalie overheard and the women confronted Erik over his multiple alliances. Erik became stressed about potentially ruining his game. At Cirie's suggestion, Natalie agreed to vote out Amanda if Erik gave her the individual immunity as a sign of trust, and proposed that this would redeem him in front of the jury. At Tribal Council, Amanda and Parvati criticized Erik for switching loyalties while Cirie emphasized the need for redemption to win the jury's favor. Erik gave Natalie the immunity necklace and the women unanimously voted him out.
243	14	"Stir the Pot!"	7.2/12	4.4/12	May 11, 2008	12.92	11
The women celebrated outlasting the men. For an immunity challenge, contestants started on poles over water and used buckets to fill a chute and obtain floating keys. They then swam to shore, unlocked pieces of a puzzle ladder, and climbed to raise a flag. Natalie took an early lead but Amanda quickly assembled her ladder and won. During the Tribal Council, Jeff hinted that there would be a final two. Cirie declared that she felt at the bottom of her alliance, which provoked an argument with Amanda. Despite this, the Favorites alliance held and Natalie, the last Fan, was voted out. Following a memory walk of those who had left the game, the remaining contestants undertook a final immunity challenge. They balanced a metal ball on a notched wooden cylinder, held only by friction, with other pieces of cylinder being added in successive rounds. Amanda won and voted Cirie out. At the final Tribal Council, Amanda emphasized her loyalty while Parvati emphasized her aggressive play. The jurors questioned Parvati's ethics and Amanda's authenticity. Ozzy's elimination became a central point, and Ozzy stated that he felt robbed of time with Amanda, feeling that he was falling in love with her.
244	15	"The Reunion"	6.0/10	3.9/10	May 11, 2008	10.84	12
Months later, the jury's votes were revealed: they sided with Parvati and declared her the Sole Survivor with a vote of 5–3 over Amanda. The 20 former contestants discussed the season with host Jeff Probst. James, for the second consecutive season, was the viewer's choice of favorite contestant, winning $100,000. Amanda and Ozzy received the next highest number of votes.

== Voting history ==
	Original tribes				Switched tribes						Merged tribe							
Episode	1	2	3	4	5	6		7		8	9	10	11	12		13	14	
Day	3	6	8	11	14	15	17	19	20	21	24	27	30	31	33	36	37	38
Tribe	Malakal	Airai	Malakal	Airai	Malakal	Airai	Malakal	Airai	Malakal	Malakal	Dabu	Dabu	Dabu	Dabu	Dabu	Dabu	Dabu	Dabu
Eliminated	Jonny Fairplay	Mary	Yau-Man	Mikey B	Joel	Jonathan	Chet	Kathy	Tracy	Ami	Eliza	Ozzy	Jason	James	Alexis	Erik	Natalie	Cirie
Votes	9–1	6–2–2	6–2–1	6–3	6–2	Evacuated (Note: No vote; Jonathan was medically evacuated from the game.)	5–2	Quit (Note: No vote; Kathy chose to quit the game.)	5–1	4–1	8–2	5–4	4–3–1	Evacuated (Note: No vote; James was medically evacuated from the game.)	2–0 (Note: Amanda played a hidden Immunity Idol; therefore, four votes against her did not count.)	4–1	3–1	1–0
Voter	Vote																	
Parvati	Jonny Fairplay		Yau-Man								Eliza	Ozzy	Jason		Alexis	Erik	Natalie	None (Note: Cirie and Parvati were not eligible to vote as the only eligible players they could vote for were each other.)
Amanda	Jonny Fairplay		Yau-Man		Joel		Chet		Tracy	Ami	Eliza	Jason	Jason		Alexis	Erik	Natalie	Cirie
Cirie	Jonny Fairplay		Yau-Man		Joel		Chet		Tracy	Ami	Eliza	Ozzy	Jason		~~Amanda~~	Erik	Natalie	None
Natalie		Mary		Mikey B							Eliza	Ozzy	James		~~Amanda~~	Erik	Cirie	
Erik		Mary		Mikey B	Chet		Chet		Tracy	Ami	Eliza	Jason	Jason		~~Amanda~~	Parvati		
Alexis		Mary		Chet							Eliza	Ozzy	James		~~Amanda~~			
James	Jonny Fairplay		Yau-Man								Eliza	Jason	Parvati	Evacuated				
Jason		Chet		Chet							Ozzy	Ozzy	James					
Ozzy	Jonny Fairplay		Yau-Man		Joel		Chet		Tracy	Ami	Eliza	Jason						
Eliza	Jonny Fairplay		Yau-Man								Ozzy							
Ami	Jonny Fairplay		Cirie		Joel		Chet		Tracy	Erik								
Tracy		Mary		Mikey B	Joel		Erik		Ozzy									
Kathy		Mary		Mikey B				Quit										
Chet		Mary		Mikey B	Joel		Erik											
Jonathan	Jonny Fairplay		Parvati			Evacuated												
Joel		Tracy		Mikey B	Chet													
Mikey B		Chet		Chet														
Yau-Man	Jonny Fairplay		Parvati															
Mary		Tracy																
Jonny Fairplay	Ozzy																	

Jury vote
Episode	15	
Day	39	
Finalist	Parvati	Amanda
Votes	5–3	
Juror	Vote	
Cirie	Yes	
Natalie	Yes	
Erik		Yes
Alexis	Yes	
James		Yes
Jason	Yes	
Ozzy		Yes
Eliza	Yes	

== Production ==
=== Casting ===
The season was initially cast as a second "all-star" season with exclusively returning players, but the idea was changed to a "fans vs. favorites" format as the producers felt that the all-star format was becoming derivative in reality television. Stephenie LaGrossa and Bobby Jon Drinkard's appearances in both Palau and Guatemala combined with Palau winner, Tom Westman declining an offer to compete due to not wanting to ruin his reputation amongst the fans of the show, excluded all contestants from those seasons to return. Westman did eventually return for Survivor: Heroes vs. Villains. Confirmed contestants who were considered but eventually cut were Coby Archa and Janu Tornell from Palau; Terry Deitz, Danielle DiLorenzo and Shane Powers from Panama; and Yul Kwon from Cook Islands. Probst expressed concern over Jonny Fairplay's inclusion on the cast, as he was skeptical of Fairplay's actions since appearing on Survivor: Pearl Islands, but he kept Fairplay as he felt Fairplay would be good for entertaining television. Probst additionally stated that casting fans for the season became a difficult task for production as they were aiming to find the show's biggest fans, noting Kathy Sleckman's frequent auditioning.

=== Filming ===
The season was filmed in Palau, marking the second time Survivor had filmed there (the first being 2005). The filming locations for this season were the same as those used in Survivor: Palau, with Airai living in the former Koror camp and Malakal living in the former Ulong camp. Exile Island returned this season after being absent from Survivor: China, with a new twist of one castaway from each tribe being sent to Exile Island where they competed to find the hidden immunity idol.

== Reception ==
This season received universal acclaim from both fans and critics, and is generally considered one of the best seasons of the show. Jeff Probst originally ranked it as his second-favorite season of all time (behind Borneo), stating that "The Parvati-led women's alliance produced some of the most memorable moments in the history of the show." Probst also stated that the Tribal Council in which Erik Reichenbach was eliminated was his favorite of all the seasons, and that Palau was his favorite filming location. Survivor columnist Dalton Ross of Entertainment Weekly also rated the season as the second-best season, saying that it had "great characters and the perfect mix of solid and stupid gameplay." He later ranked this season and Borneo as tied for the best seasons, saying,

"I've gone back and forth with these two over the years. After Micronesia aired, I named it the best Survivor season ever. Upon reflection, while I still considered it the most enjoyable, I also worried I was understating the impact of the first season, which became a national phenomenon. (Yes, Borneo now seems dated and tame by comparison, but it's the biggest game changer in the past 20 years of television.) So then I returned that to the #1 spot. If I wanted to watch one season again, it would be Micronesia. If you ask me which is the most important season, well, obviously it's Borneo. So instead of constantly flipping them, they can simply share the top spot...until I change my mind again."

Ross, in a 2019 Entertainment Weekly oral history discussion of Erik's elimination episode, named the resulting blindside as the greatest Survivor moment in the show's history.

Slant magazine gave the season a 3.5-star rating out of 4, saying "Never in Survivor history has there been such a string of shocking tribal councils one right after the next." Andy Dehnart of reality blurred also gave the season a positive review, stating that the moment where Erik gave individual immunity to Natalie helped make "Survivor: Micronesia the best season ever—or at least, the best second half of a season ever." In 2014, Joe Reid of The Wire ranked it as the sixth-best season of the series. Survivor fan site "Survivor Oz" ranked Micronesia as the second-best season of the series (behind Heroes vs. Villains) in its annual polls in 2012 and 2013, while it was ranked fourth in 2014 and fifth in 2015. "The Purple Rock Podcast" ranked it as the fifth-best season. In 2015, in a poll held on the website of former Survivor contestant Rob Cesternino, Micronesia was ranked as the fourth-greatest season of the series by the website's users, while Cesternino himself personally ranked it as the second-best season, behind Survivor: Heroes vs. Villains. This was updated in 2021 during Cesternino's podcast, Survivor All-Time Top 40 Rankings, ranking 4th out of 40. In 2020, Inside Survivor ranked this season 7th out of 40, calling it a "strong season from start to finish with a few bumps along the way". In 2024, Nick Caruso of TVLine ranked this season 1st out of 47.

In the official CBS Watch issue commemorating Survivor's 15th anniversary, Micronesia was voted by viewers as the third-greatest season of the series, behind Heroes vs. Villains and Pearl Islands. Three of the top ten contestants voted by viewers as the greatest were in this season (Lusth, Fields, and Shallow). Another poll in the same magazine, asking viewers to vote for the most memorable moment in the series, saw Ozzy's elimination in episode ten come in second, behind Sandra Diaz-Twine burning Russell Hantz's hat in Heroes vs. Villains.

The gameplay of Shallow was very well-received by fans and critics alike. In the official issue of CBS Watch commemorating the 15th anniversary of Survivor, Shallow was voted by viewers as the fourth greatest contestant in the history of the series (only behind Rob Cesternino, Russell Hantz, and Rob Mariano), and was the highest-ranking female contestant. In 2017, Entertainment Weekly had fans of the series rank the 34 winners and Shallow came in 1st place. In 2015, host Jeff Probst named Shallow one of his top ten favorite Survivor winners, and one of his top four favorite female winners. In 2020, before the premiere of Winners at War, Probst named Shallow the best winner ever.
