= Survivor: Fiji =

- Season 14
- Region 1 DVD cover
- Presented by: Jeff Probst
- No. of days: 39
- No. of castaways: 19
- Winner: Earl Cole
- Runners-up: Cassandra Franklin; Andria "Dreamz" Herd
- Location: Macuata, Fiji
- No. of episodes: 15

Release
- Original network: CBS
- Original release: February 8 – May 13, 2007

Additional information
- Filming dates: October 30 – December 7, 2006

Season chronology
- ← Previous; Cook Islands Next → China

Survivor: Fiji is the fourteenth season of the American CBS competitive reality television series Survivor. The season was filmed in the Fiji Islands from October 30 until December 7, 2006, and aired from February 8, 2007, until the two-hour season finale on May 13, 2007, followed by a live reunion from Ed Sullivan Theater in New York City, where Earl Cole was named the Sole Survivor over Andria "Dreamz" Herd and Cassandra Franklin in the first unanimous vote of the show's history.

This is the first season of Survivor to have an odd number of castaways, with 19, after a 20th castaway, Mellisa McNulty, withdrew the night before filming began. Due to the timing and lack of alternates, her spot could not be replaced. Gary Stritesky was the only contestant who applied to be on the show; McNulty and the other 18 contestants were recruited. The cast maintained a similarly racially diverse cast (with the intended 20 person cast containing equal amounts of African American, Asian American, Hispanic American, and European American castaways) as Survivor: Cook Islands, in a conscious effort intended to show that the racial diversity of Survivor: Cook Islands was not just a ratings stunt.

== Format ==
Survivor is a reality television show based on the Swedish show Expedition Robinson, created by Mark Burnett and Charlie Parsons. The series follows a number of participants isolated in a remote location, where they must provide food, fire, and shelter. One participant is removed from the series by majority vote every three days, with challenges held to give a reward (ranging from living- and food-related prizes to a car) and immunity from being voted out of the series. The last remaining player receives a prize of $1,000,000.

== Contestants ==
The two tribes were Moto and Ravu, meaning "spear" and "to kill" in Fijian respectively, while the merged tribe Bula Bula means "welcome" or "hello" in Fijian.

Fiji is the first season to have a gender imbalance, due to one contestant pulling herself from the cast right before filming began. It would be followed by Survivor: San Juan del Sur, Survivor 47, and Survivor 51.

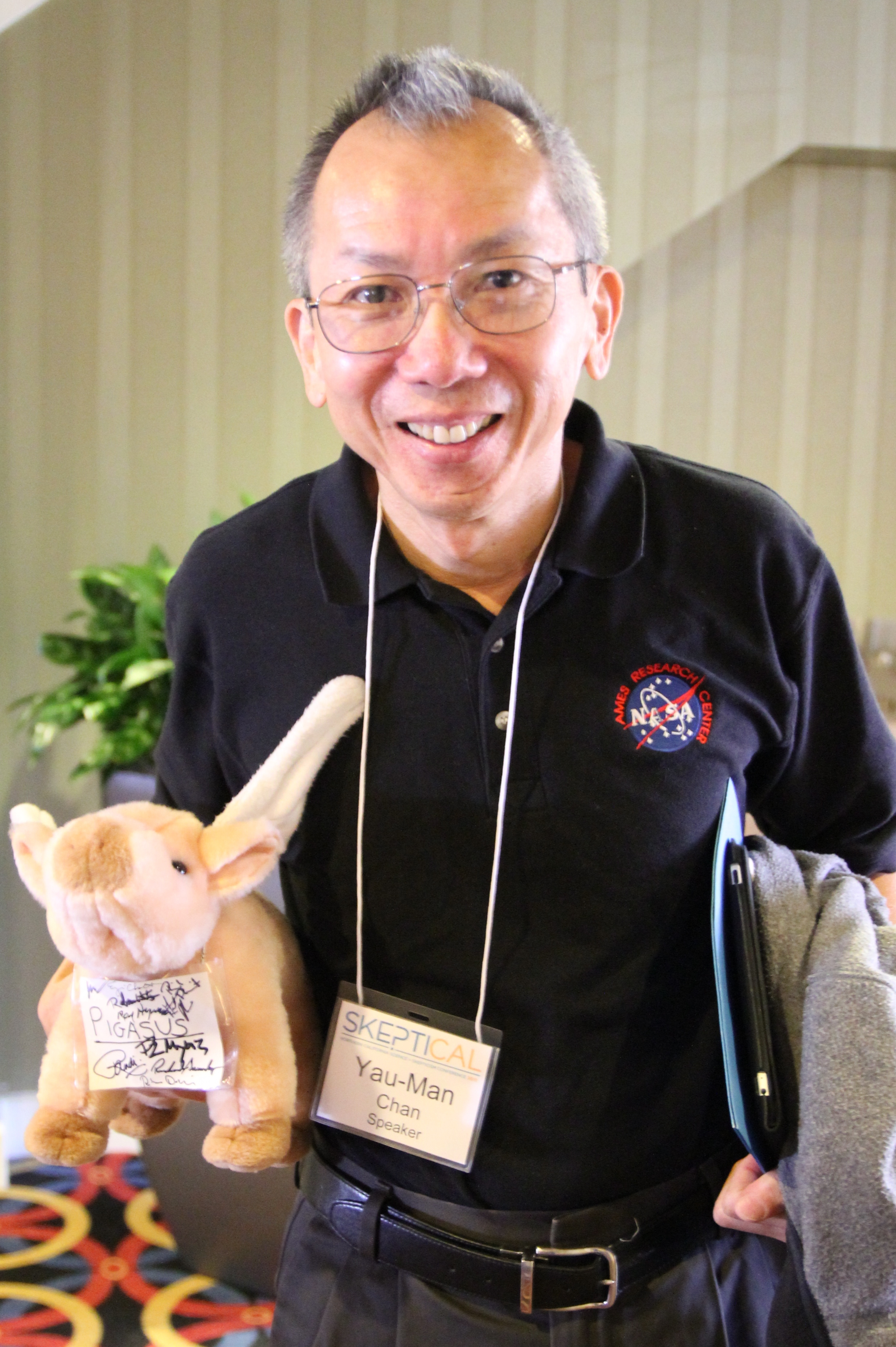
Yau-Man Chan

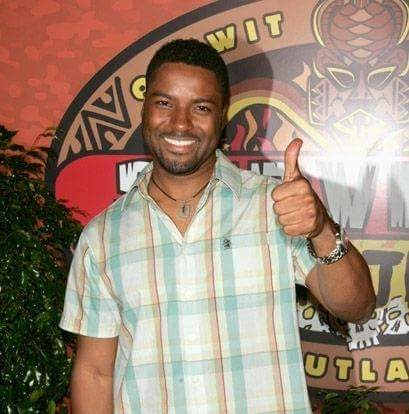
Earl Cole

List of Survivor: Fiji contestants
Contestant	Age	From	Tribe			Finish	
Contestant	Age	From	Original	Switched	Merged	Placement	Day
Jessica deBen	27	Los Angeles, California	Ravu			1st voted out	Day 3
Erica Durousseau	27	Baton Rouge, Louisiana	Ravu			2nd voted out	Day 6
Sylvia Kwan	52	Ross, California	Ravu			3rd voted out	Day 8
Gary Stritesky	55	Ramsey, Minnesota	Moto			Quit (Illness)	Day 10
Liliana Gomez	25	Los Angeles, California	Moto			4th voted out	Day 11
Rita Verreos	38	San Antonio, Texas	Ravu			5th voted out	Day 14
Anthony Robinson	32	Compton, California	Ravu	Ravu		6th voted out	Day 16
James "Rocky" Reid	28	Los Angeles, California	Ravu	Ravu		7th voted out 1st jury member	Day 19
Lisette "Lisi" Linares	36	Los Angeles, California	Moto	Ravu		8th voted out 2nd jury member	Day 21
Michelle Yi	23	Cincinnati, Ohio	Ravu	Moto	Bula Bula	9th voted out 3rd jury member	Day 24
Edgardo Rivera	28	Miami Beach, Florida	Moto	Ravu	Bula Bula	10th voted out 4th jury member	Day 27
Mookie Lee	25	Chicago, Illinois	Ravu	Ravu	Bula Bula	11th voted out 5th jury member	Day 30
Alex Angarita	28	Los Angeles, California	Moto	Ravu	Bula Bula	12th voted out 6th jury member	Day 33
Stacy Kimball	27	Boulder, Colorado	Moto	Moto	Bula Bula	13th voted out 7th jury member	Day 36
Kenward "Boo" Bernis	34	Lafayette, Louisiana	Moto	Moto	Bula Bula	14th voted out 8th jury member	Day 37
Yau-Man Chan	54	Martinez, California	Ravu	Moto	Bula Bula	15th voted out 9th jury member	Day 38
Andria "Dreamz" Herd	25	Wilmington, North Carolina	Moto	Ravu	Bula Bula	Co-runners-up	Day 39
Cassandra Franklin	42	Los Angeles, California	Moto	Moto	Bula Bula	Co-runners-up	Day 39
Earl Cole	35	Santa Monica, California	Ravu	Moto	Bula Bula	Sole Survivor	Day 39

=== Future appearances ===
Yau-Man Chan later competed in Survivor: Micronesia.

Outside of Survivor, Earl Cole appeared on an episode of the thirteenth season of Shark Tank. Cole was also a contestant on the 2022 USA Network reality competition series Snake in the Grass.

== Season summary ==
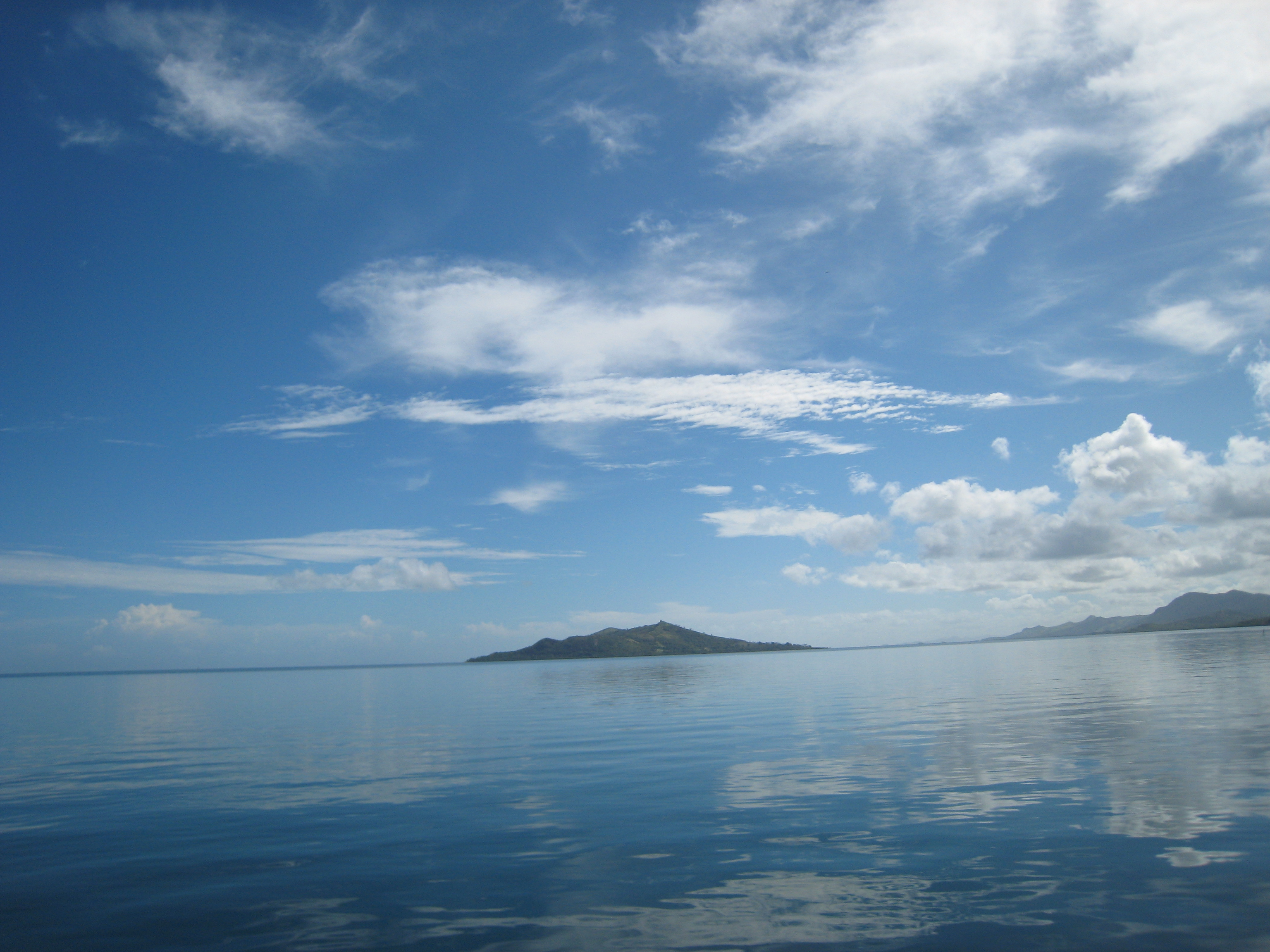
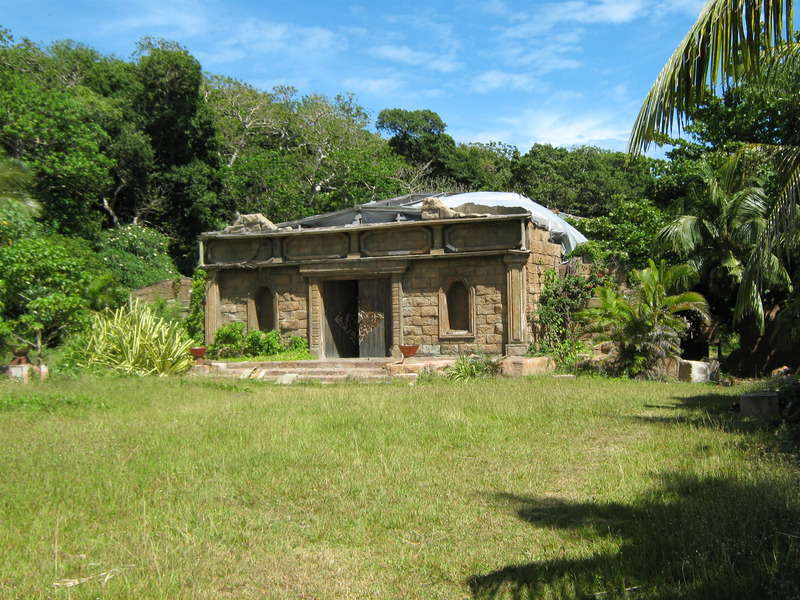
The season was filmed in the Macuata Province in Fiji.

Due to one player dropping out prior to the game, the season started with 19 players. After arriving at their beach as one group, instructions and materials for building a camp were dropped from a plane. Before the first challenge, the castaways were divided into two tribes by Sylvia, appointed for her leadership in building the camp, who was sent to Exile Island due to the odd number of players. After the challenge, the winning team, Moto, returned to the constructed camp, while the losing team, Ravu, was directed to a different beach where only meager supplies awaited them; Sylvia joined Ravu shortly afterwards. While both tribes vied equally in challenges, it was clear Moto was in much better shape due to the better camp, winning every single challenge. The better camp was seen as such a boon that, when given a choice after the fourth Immunity Challenge to forfeit either the immunity they just won or their camp to Ravu, they chose to forfeit immunity and vote someone out. On Ravu, an alliance between Earl and Yau-Man was formed. When Earl was sent to Exile Island, he conspired with Yau-Man to find a hidden immunity idol located at the camp, which Yau-Man did.

A tribal shuffle served to further alliances; Earl and Yau-Man brought Michelle, Cassandra and Boo into their fold, while Alex became the leader of an alliance between himself, Mookie, Edgardo, and Dreamz, titling themselves the "Four Horsemen". Mookie found the other hidden immunity idol, but decided not to tell Dreamz because of the latter's lack of trustworthiness. The tribes merged at the original Moto camp, stripped of their original structures and luxuries. The first post-merge immunity challenge divided the contestants into two randomly selected teams, putting Michelle with most of the Horsemen, and leading to her being voted out. After Dreamz discovered his alliance had neglected to tell him about Mookie's idol, he defected to Earl's alliance and worked with them to trick Mookie into misplaying his idol. Stacy joined their alliance and suggested targeting Edgardo, resulting in the systematic eliminations of the three loyal Horsemen.

The reward challenge played by the final six players was for a truck. Yau-Man won the challenge, but made a deal with Dreamz to trade the truck in exchange for the final challenge's immunity necklace should Dreamz win it. While Dreamz attempted to get out of the deal by targeting Yau-Man immediately, Yau-Man played his idol and Stacy was sent home, followed by Boo for being a physical threat. Dreamz won the final immunity challenge, but reneged on his deal with Yau-Man at the subsequent Tribal Council; Yau-Man was the final player voted out. At the final Tribal Council, Dreamz's actions and Cassandra's quiet game led the jury to vote unanimously for Earl as the 14th Sole Survivor.

Challenge winners and eliminations by episode
Episode			Challenge winner(s)		Exile Island	Eliminated	
No.	Title	Original air date	Reward	Immunity	Exile Island	Tribe	Player
1	"Something Cruel Is About to Happen... Real Soon"	February 8, 2007	Moto		Sylvia (Note: Sylvia was given the task of dividing the tribes. As a result, she was sent to Exile Island and joined the tribe that lost the subsequent Immunity Challenge: Ravu.)	Ravu	Jessica
2	"Snakes Are Misunderstood... We Have an Understanding Now"	February 15, 2007	Moto		Earl (Ravu)	Ravu	Erica
3	"This Is Not Survival...It's a Thrival"	February 22, 2007	Moto	Moto	Sylvia (Ravu)	Ravu	Sylvia
4	"Let's Just Call Jeff on the Jeff Phone"	March 1, 2007	Moto	~~Moto~~ (Note: Moto won the immunity challenge, but received a message which forced them to choose between keeping their camp or keeping immunity. The Moto tribe chose to retain their camp and gave immunity to Ravu.)	Yau-Man (Ravu)	Moto	Gary
4	"Let's Just Call Jeff on the Jeff Phone"	March 1, 2007	Moto	Ravu	Yau-Man (Ravu)	Moto	Liliana
5	"Love Many, Trust Few, Do Wrong to None"	March 8, 2007	Moto	Moto	Earl (Ravu)	Ravu	Rita
6	"I've Got Strength Now to Carry the Flag"	March 21, 2007	None (Note: There was no reward challenge due to a tribe switch.)	Moto	Lisi (Note: Lisi was sent to Exile Island after not being chosen during the tribe swap. She joined the tribe that lost the next Immunity Challenge: Ravu.)	Ravu	Anthony
7	"An Evil Thought"	March 29, 2007	Ravu	Moto	Earl (Moto)	Ravu	Rocky
8	"So You Think You Can Meke?"	April 5, 2007	Moto	Moto	Lisi (Ravu)	Ravu	Lisi
9	"Are We Gonna Live on Exile Island?!"	April 12, 2007	Boo, Cassandra, Earl, Edgardo, Yau-Man		None (Note: There was no exiling due to the merge.)	Bula Bula	Michelle
10	"It's a Turtle?!"	April 19, 2007	Cassandra [Boo, Dreamz, Yau-Man]	Yau-Man	Mookie	Bula Bula	Edgardo
11	"Blackmail or Betrayal"	April 26, 2007	Alex, Dreamz, Earl, Stacy	Stacy	Boo	Bula Bula	Mookie
12	"A Smile, Velvet Gloves and a Dagger in My Pocket"	May 3, 2007	Boo, Dreamz, Yau-Man	Boo	Earl	Bula Bula	Alex
13	"I Wanna See If I Can Make a Deal"	May 10, 2007	~~Yau-Man~~ (Dreamz) (Note: Boo, Stacy, and Yau-Man won a picnic lunch as part of the reward, then Yau-Man individually won a new truck as an additional reward. Yau-Man chose to give his entire reward to Dreamz.)	Boo	Yau-Man	Bula Bula	Stacy
13	"I Wanna See If I Can Make a Deal"	May 10, 2007	Boo, Stacy	Boo	Yau-Man	Bula Bula	Stacy
14	"You've Got That Puzzled Look"	May 13, 2007	None	Yau-Man	None	Bula Bula	Boo
14	"You've Got That Puzzled Look"	May 13, 2007	None	Dreamz	None	Bula Bula	Yau-Man
15	"Reunion"	May 13, 2007					

In the case of multiple tribes or castaways who win reward or immunity, they are listed in order of finish, or alphabetically where it was a team effort; where one castaway won and invited others, the invitees are in brackets.

== Episodes ==
No. overall	No. in season	Title	Original release date	U.S. viewers (millions)	Rating/share (18-49)
200	1	"Something Cruel Is About to Happen...Real Soon"	February 8, 2007	16.44	5.7/15
The 19 castaways arrived on an island with no instructions and were not split into tribes. After some time, a box was parachuted, which contained plans for a luxurious shelter using the provided building supplies. The castaways spent the next two days constructing the shelter from the plans under the primary direction of Sylvia. At the combined Reward and Immunity Challenge, the castaways were asked who the leader was during construction and unanimously named Sylvia. Sylvia was told to split the castaways into two tribes, Moto and Ravu, but was then exiled. She would be immune from Tribal Council and would join whichever tribe lost the Immunity Challenge. Jeff then revealed the existence of the Hidden Immunity Idol, with the first clue available on Exile Island.: Reward/Immunity Challenge: Both tribes race chariots across a course with stops at which the tribe members riding on the chariots untie three bags containing puzzle pieces. Once all bags and a small tribe flag are retrieved, the tribes race to the puzzle table to solve the puzzle, revealing the three-number combination to a wheel containing a knife. With this knife, the tribe cuts a rope raising the tribe's flag to win reward and immunity. The reward allowed the winning tribe to live at the luxury camp built upon arrival.; Ravu lost the challenge and was sent to a new island with only one pot and a machete. Moto returned to the original tribe to live in the shelter built on day one and two with additional amenities. Rocky, Erica, and Jessica formed a strong alliance, while the other six formed a looser alliance. Jessica was blamed for losing the challenge and being under the radar, and was voted out.
201	2	"Snakes Are Misunderstood...We Have an Understanding Now"	February 15, 2007	16.08	5.6/15
Ravu continued to suffer from dehydration and were reduced to licking water off of leaves, though they found a supply of pineapples in addition to their coconut supply. At Moto, the castaways continued to live a cushy life at their camp. Boo injured himself in the eye and then shortly thereafter cut himself with an ax while chopping wood, and then the hammock he was lying on fell down. On Day Five, Sylvia returned from Exile Island and immediately declared that she felt like an outcast. Her tribemates were annoyed by her perceived bossiness and the fact that she had plenty of water to drink on Exile Island.: Reward/Immunity Challenge: Each tribe will paddle a canoe out and around their tribe flag. While the tribes are heading back to shore the must collect four supply crates. Once they pass a crate, one tribe member must connect the crate to the boat. After getting to shore, they must get the crates to their tribe mat. Once the tribes get all four crates they must untie them to get six puzzle pole pieces and a flag. The first tribe to solve the pole puzzle and raise their tribe flag wins reward (fishing gear) and immunity, and the ability to send a member of the losing tribe to Exile Island.; In a close race, Moto pulled out another win and chose Earl to go to Exile Island. Anthony lobbied to vote out Sylvia for being the outsider and disrupting the tribe's chemistry. However, Erica's panicking during the challenge caused a movement against her that resulted in her elimination.
202	3	"This Is Not Survival...It's Thrival"	February 22, 2007	13.47	4.6/12
Michelle finally started a fire at Ravu using Yau-Man's glasses. Michelle used Yau-Man's glasses because the thicker bifocals concentrated the light better than her own glasses.: Reward Challenge: One member from each tribe will face head to head on a slippery course to receive a number ball. Once the tribe member is on the course they must get the ball and throw it into a basket. First tribe to six, wins one of three choices of reward: Either luxury items from home, a duplicate set of fishing gear, or a basket of fresh fruit.; Despite Ravu's momentum from starting a fire, it failed to carry over to the Reward Challenge as they lost yet again, though they did gain flint for successfully earning fire on their own. Moto opted to have a second set of fishing gear as reward instead of their luxury items or fresh fruit. Moto also won the right to send somebody to Exile Island and they selected Sylvia to go for a second time. After the Reward Challenge when Moto returned to camp, Gary felt dizzy and complained of chest pain, thinking that it may have been a cracked rib suffered during the Reward Challenge. The medics were called in and he was cleared to continue, though his tribe encouraged him to not be afraid to call for medical help should he not be able to breathe. This deflated some of Moto's elation of the Reward win.: Immunity Challenge: Tribes are challenged to eat Fijian dishes, such as giant clam, octopus tentacles, peanut worms, sea cucumbers, fish eyes and pig snouts in a series of 1-on-1 matches. The first tribe to win four matches wins immunity.; At the Immunity Challenge, tempers flared after some taunting by Mookie, but Moto was able to continue their win streak. Sylvia, knowing she was vulnerable from the previous vote and her performance at the Reward Challenge, attempted to find the idol at camp using the three clues she had, but was unsuccessful and subsequently voted out at Tribal Council.
203	4	"Let's Just Call Jeff on the Jeff Phone"	March 1, 2007	14.67	5.0/13
Gary continued to suffer from vertigo due to an allergic reaction brought on by bug bites.: Reward Challenge: Each tribe will stand on a balance beam. One at a time a tribe member must pass through a tribe member to get to the finish platform. First tribe to have all tribe members on the platform wins fish, rice, spices, pillows, blankets, and a king size bed.; Moto came up with a great strategy to win the Reward Challenge after initially falling behind to win the challenge. Moto chose to send Yau-Man to Exile Island, and a frustrated Rocky threw a temper tantrum after his tribe's fifth consecutive loss. On Day 10, Gary decided that his condition was not getting any better and he pulled himself from the game.: Immunity Challenge: Four tribe members will begin locked in floating cages. One tribe member will start on shore and race out to unlock the first cage, releasing the first tribe member. The newly freed tribe member will run across floating lily pads to free the next member in a locked cage. Once the fourth tribe member is freed from their locked cage, those tribe members will get on a boat where another tribe member will be waiting with a ring of keys. The teams will paddle back to shore, picking up the stranded tribemates along the way. Once back, the Survivors will form a human pyramid. The person at the top will use a ring of keys to unlock a series of pad locks, freeing their last tribe member from the last cage. The first tribe to get all members back on their tribe mat wins Immunity.; Rocky decided to motivate his tribe by wearing one of the women's pink tops to the Immunity Challenge, but this did not help as Moto's winning streak continued. In a twist, Moto opened a sealed bottle that contained a note that forced them to either give up their luxurious camp or their immunity. Moto decided to keep their comfort and go to Tribal Council. The alliance of Alex, Boo, Edgardo, Lisi, and Stacy discussed voting strategies for tribal council, and decided to target Liliana after viewing Dreamz as an asset for the tribe and Cassandra as harmless. The decision was motivated after Liliana gave the men a sports massage, which Lisi saw as deceptive. Alex was initially against this decision as he feels Liliana was about as strong as the men of the tribe, and preferred to eliminate weak link Cassandra instead. Despite that, the alliance stuck with their decision and Liliana was voted out.
204	5	"Love Many, Trust Few, Do Wrong to None"	March 8, 2007	13.81	4.6/12
Earl and Yau-Man discussed their clues about the Hidden Immunity Idol. Earl took the tribe on a hunting expedition away from camp, leaving Yau-Man to dig for the Idol using only a machete, but his search turned up nothing.: Reward Challenge: The Survivors will square off, one on one, on a platform. Using large padded bags they will battle sumo style, knocking the other tribe member off the platform to score a point for their tribe. The first tribe to score seven points wins two items chosen from a catalog by each tribe.; At the Reward Challenge, Moto crushed Ravu and opted to send Earl back to Exile Island. Lisi and Stacy upset Alex and Edgardo by going on a power trip, treating Cassandra and Dreamz rudely. Dreamz decided that he and Cassandra would flip to the other side after the unspoken alliance's effort to smooth things over rang hollow.: Immunity Challenge: Scattered in a field are 30 boards. Each board has a number or a word painted on it. One tribe at a time will send a member out to reveal two boards. If the numbers or words on the boards match, they’ll score a point for their tribe. The first tribe to score seven points wins Immunity. To make things more difficult, there are 4 dummy boards on the course without a match.; Moto won a close Immunity Challenge to remain undefeated. Rita annoyed Rocky with her chitchatting with Michelle and she was voted out.
205	6	"I've Got Strength Now to Carry the Flag"	March 21, 2007	12.78	4.2/12
After receiving tree mail, Moto and Ravu head to what they believed was a Reward Challenge. Jeff asked the tribes to volunteer one member from each tribe; Earl from Ravu and Edgardo from Moto volunteered, and were instructed to begin the selection of new tribes by schoolyard pick. An upset Lisi was not picked and was sent to Exile Island. Edgardo and Earl then played Rock, Paper, Scissors, for the right to draw from a bag that contained Moto and Ravu buffs to see which tribe went to which camp and Edgardo drew the less luxurious Ravu camp. The new Moto tribe became Earl, Yau-Man, Cassandra, Boo, Michelle, and Stacy, with the new Ravu being Rocky, Dreamz, Mookie, Edgardo, Anthony, and Alex. Cassandra, who had been weak without any alliance in the old Moto tribe quickly warmed up to the new members. Over at Ravu, the new members didn't let their worse camp deter them from strengthening the team with their positive attitude and good health.: Immunity Challenge: Each tribe will be belted into a large six point sliding hub resembling a star. By shifting, sliding and adjusting each other they will maneuver through a course of bamboo poles. Along the way the tribes will pass through five gates. Making things more difficult, the tribe paths intersect at four points in the course, which could result in the two tribes colliding before reaching the finish line. The first tribe to get all their members across finish line wins Immunity.; Despite their renewed attitude, Ravu was not able to win the closely contested Immunity Challenge. At the Ravu camp, two heads were on the chopping block: Anthony for being seen as weak and Rocky for his obnoxious behavior. Things became tense at Tribal Council, when Anthony unleashed some pent up anger at Rocky. When it came to the vote, Anthony was voted out, and Lisi joined the Ravu tribe.
206	7	"An Evil Thought"	March 29, 2007	13.71	4.5/14
Lisi joined the Ravu tribe after spending two days on Exile Island. Dreamz immediately saw Lisi as an outsider and the weakest person, as well as being annoying. Earl took his tribemates to try to retrieve Moto's stranded boat, leaving Yau-Man to search for the hidden immunity idol. Using Moto's digging tools, Yau-Man found the hidden immunity idol and vowed to share the idol with Earl.: Reward Challenge: Each tribe will use a flamethrower to launch fireballs at three separate targets. Each time they hit a target it will burst into flames. The first tribe to ignite all three of their targets wins a trip via seaplane to a private Fijian arcade where they will enjoy an afternoon of foosball, bowling and billiards while consuming hot dogs and beer.; At the reward challenge, Dreamz's perfect aim led Ravu to finally break their losing streak. Ravu sent Earl to Exile Island, and they enjoyed their reward. After suffering stomachaches from gorging on too many hot dogs, Rocky (the only one who moderated and ended up without a stomachache) told them that "it is what it is." Although Lisi was planned as the next to go if Ravu lost immunity, the others were fed up with Rocky's harsh attitude and did not want to suffer the same fate as Anthony. Yau-Man made a fake hidden immunity idol out of a half coconut shell and buried it where he found the real immunity idol, although not as deep so it will be easier to find. Yau-Man knew that it was important to win the next Immunity Challenge after he was targeted by Boo, but at least has the idol to save himself but hoped he could save it for later use.: Immunity Challenge: Each tribe will designate one person to be the caller while the rest of the tribe is blindfolded. One at a time, the caller will guide their tribe out into a field where five skulls are hanging. Using a Fijian war club one player must smash a skull, releasing a bundle of tiles trapped inside. While still blindfolded that player must then find the tiles, take them to their puzzle board and race back to the start. Then the next person will go. Once the tribes collect all five bundles of tiles, the entire tribe will race to unscramble the tiles and decipher a two-word phrase (Cannibal Isles). The first tribe to correctly solve the phrase wins Immunity.; At the immunity challenge, Ravu and Moto were neck and neck, but Moto finished the puzzle quicker to win immunity. Knowing she was next and wanting to keep herself in the game, Lisi told Alex the clues she got from Exile Island to the whereabouts to the hidden immunity idol on Ravu. Alex and Edgardo then concluded that they preferred Lisi's loyalty over Rocky's strength and attitude. Dreamz agreed with them, but Mookie still felt taking out physically strong Rocky was too risky and wanted the weaker Lisi out. In the end, loyalty outweighed physical strength as Rocky was voted out, becoming the first member of the jury.
207	8	"So You Think You Can Meke?"	April 5, 2007	13.58	4.3/13
While Dreamz and Lisi slept, Alex, Edgardo, and Mookie found the hidden Immunity Idol using the clues that Lisi told Alex. The three men decided not to tell Dreamz or Lisi that they found the idol, though Lisi figured out that Alex told Mookie about the clues. Alex stated that they would share the idol, but Mookie made it clear that he had primary control of the idol because he dug it up. After Lisi mocked the idea that anyone else had found the idol, Mookie had some fun by helping her dig in the spot where he'd already found it in order to maintain the belief that the idol was still hidden.: Reward Challenge: Both tribes were taught a Meke, a traditional Fijian dance. Each tribe will perform this Meke in front of Fijian judges who are experts in Fijian dance. They will be judged on three criteria: appearance, authenticity and spirit. Winners will indulge in a Fijian feast of chicken, pork and seafood while enjoying Fijian entertainment.; At the Reward Challenge, both Moto and Ravu tied for both appearance and spirit, but Moto beat Ravu in the dance (moves and timing) category. Moto enjoyed a traditional Fijian feast with the natives while Ravu's morale sunk. Lisi struggled at Exile Island during the thunderstorm. She was upset about Ravu continuing to lose challenges and had thoughts on quitting the game.: Immunity Challenge: Using three different weapons, tribes will test their skills. The first round is blowdarts, one shot per tribe member, and whoever gets closest to the bull's eye scores one point for their tribe. The second round is spear throwing; the closest to the bull's eye scores two points for their tribe. For the final round they would shoot a bow and arrow, with the tribe member to hit closest to the bull's eye scoring three points. The tribe with the most points after all three rounds wins Immunity.; Moto continued their winning streak by winning all three rounds of the immunity challenge, with Yau-Man showing off some unorthodox but successful techniques in spear throwing and archery. A frustrated Lisi told her tribe that she wanted to be voted out, which made Dreamz happy because he'd never gotten along with her. Lisi then changed her mind and hoped that Alex and Edgardo would vote out Dreamz, but the tribe had enough and decided to vote out Lisi.
208	9	"Are We Gonna Live on Exile Island?!"	April 12, 2007	14.25	4.5/13
On day 22, the tribes received tree mail that told them to paddle immediately to Exile Island and to not take any of their rewards or flints with them. When they arrived, they discovered a box in the tower on the island with purple buffs and a note telling them that they were now a merged tribe and they were to return to the Moto camp. When they arrived, everything had been removed and the castaways would have to rebuild from scratch. All the castaways started scrambling for new alliances or tried to bring back together old ones. Michelle chose the name Bula Bula for the merged tribe, meaning "hello hello." At the combined Reward and Immunity Challenge, the castaways were randomly split into two competing teams consisting of a green team (Alex, Dreamz, Michelle, Mookie, and Stacy) and an orange team (Boo, Cassandra, Earl, Edgardo, and Yau-Man). The winning team would be immune and not attend Tribal Council, and the losing team would immediately open a note containing instructions after the challenge.: Reward/Immunity Challenge: Shown a large Fijian mask, teams are to memorize the symbols and their arrangement on the mask. Teams will paddle down a river to three stations to retrieve three bundles of puzzle pieces. Once they have retrieved all three bundles, they'll paddle to the finish where two tribe members from each team will then use those pieces to construct six of the symbols from their Fijian mask. The team would then have to place the six symbols on the correct positions on their team mask. The first team to place the symbols in the correct order on their team mask wins immunity and a feast of massive slabs of steak, veggies and seasoning, and a few bottles of wine.; Leading from the start, the orange team won the combined Reward and Immunity Challenge, leaving Alex, Dreamz, Michelle, Mookie, and Stacy to go to Tribal Council. The note revealed that they were to go to Tribal Council immediately and were not allowed to discuss anything or strategize. When they got to Tribal Council, Jeff asked each Survivor to tell him a good reason to vote out another castaway. Through this, Alex implied that he was voting for Michelle. Dreamz decided to also vote for Michelle, and she was sent to the jury.
209	10	"It's a Turtle?!"	April 19, 2007	13.33	4.5/13
After half the tribe returned from the previous Tribal Council, tensions were high as everyone knew the next vote would decide the game between the two alliances: Earl and Yau-Man's Ravu alliance, and Moto's "Four Horseman." Michelle's ouster caused Boo, Cassandra, Earl, and Yau-Man to regroup and make a new strategy.: Reward Challenge: After answering a series of questions in private, Jeff will ask the questions again, but this time Survivors will guess what the tribe as a whole answered. Each time someone gets an answer correct, they will smash a tower belonging to another tribe member. When all three towers are smashed, that person is out of the challenge. The last person standing wins a huge barbecue and a night aboard a 70-foot luxury yacht.; Cassandra won the first individual Reward Challenge, sending Mookie to Exile Island, and bringing along Boo, Dreamz, and Yau-Man on a private yacht trip. During the challenge, which involved each tribe member guessing which competitors were named by the others for numerous questions, Stacy received several negative titles, including "Who do you NOT want to see after the game is over?" and "Who wasted this great opportunity?". On the yacht, Cassandra and Yau-Man talked Dreamz into their alliance.: Immunity Challenge: The survivors will use their arms to brace themselves between two walls, while their feet are positioned on very narrow footholds. Every 30 minutes Survivors will step down to an even smaller foothold. When they reach the third and final foothold they will stay there as long as they can. If a survivor falls off, they are out of the challenge. The main rule: no hips, no back, and no butts. Arms and feet only. Last person left standing wins individual Immunity.; The first individual Immunity Challenge was won by Yau-Man. In the ensuing scramble to decide the vote at Tribal Council, the self-titled "Four Horsemen" of Alex, Dreamz, Edgardo, and Mookie figured that Earl must have the other hidden Immunity Idol and planned to vote him off. Both Alex and Yau-Man tried to convince Stacy to join their alliances. In the end, Stacy sided with Yau-Man. Alex, Edgardo, and Mookie told Dreamz that they found the hidden immunity idol at Ravu, which caused Dreamz to waver because they kept it a secret from him. Dreamz jumped sides and told Cassandra, Earl, and Yau-Man that Mookie had found an Immunity Idol; Cassandra responded, "Mmmhmm". Initially, the group of Boo, Cassandra, Dreamz, Earl, Stacy, and Yau-Man decided to target Alex. Feeling threatened, Alex asked Mookie to discreetly give him the hidden Immunity Idol for protection at Tribal Council. Dreamz noticed this exchange and told the Earl's alliance of the swap, and the same group decided to change the target to Mookie. Edgardo later suggested to the Four Horsemen that they vote off Cassandra instead, as she was a strong middle player in the game and if Earl did have the Immunity Idol, their plan may backfire. Seeing that Dreamz may have been playing both sides of the game and hoping to improve her standing with her critical teammates, Stacy suggested to Boo, Cassandra, Earl, and Yau-Man that they vote off Edgardo and not tell Dreamz about this change; regardless of whether Alex and Mookie had the idol (facts unsure by Dreamz's double-sided dealings), Edgardo would be left unprotected and be voted off if the 5-member alliance held. This would also confirm whether Dreamz was trustworthy and cost the Four Horsemen use of the idol. At Tribal Council, Alex played the hidden Immunity Idol, but for naught as he received no votes, and the Earl-led alliance stuck to their plan and voted out Edgardo. Jeff noted the Hidden Immunity Idol would be re-hidden with new clues available on Exile Island.
210	11	"Blackmail or Betrayal"	April 26, 2007	13.83	4.6/14
With Edgardo gone and Dreamz having defected, the "Four Horsemen" alliance collapsed. Alex and Mookie confronted Dreamz about why he double crossed them at Tribal Council, but Dreamz tried to cover because he noted he needed their votes if he was to make it further in the game.: Reward Challenge: The tribe will be randomly divided into two teams, and one person from each team will launch balls from a platform out into the muddy field. The other teammates will attempt to catch the ball using a basket. Each time someone catches a ball they score a point for their team, regardless of which team's ball they catch. The first team to score five points wins. For the reward, a seaplane will take the winning team to a luxury spa resort where they will have a hot shower, dinner and a night in a bed.; Boo struggled in the Reward Challenge when he injured his knee, but he popped it back into place and continued playing. Alex, Dreamz, Earl, and Stacy won the reward and sent Boo to Exile Island. At the spa, Alex scrambled to see if he could get any support from his fellow tribemates, but he could not. Alex and Mookie figured that Yau-Man had the other hidden Immunity Idol from the Moto camp and confirmed this when they searched through his personal belongings. They plotted to confront Yau-Man about the idol at Tribal Council to either get him to lie about having the idol or stir up trouble by casting doubt among his alliance. However, Cassandra and Stacy were nearby, attempting to eavesdrop on the conversation. Although they only heard small parts of the conversation and didn't learn exactly what their adversaries were planning, they were spotted by Mookie and Alex, who then decided to confront Yau-Man immediately. They attempted to blackmail Yau-Man into telling his alliance about the hidden Immunity Idol or they would tell them. Yau-Man decided to tell the members of his alliance, but the strongest reaction was anger that Alex and Mookie went through Yau-Man's personal bag.: Immunity Challenge: Testing their memory, each Survivor will secretly select three squares on a grid, horizontally, vertically or diagonally. The goal is to knock out their opposing teammate by guessing squares and bombing them one by one. When all three squares belonging to a Survivor are knocked out, they'll be out of the challenge. The last person with squares still left on the board wins individual Immunity.; At the Immunity Challenge, Stacy won immunity by taking out Yau-Man and Alex. Boo convinced his alliance that it would be better to split the votes between Alex and Mookie, just in case either of them had found the remaining idol, even though neither of them had any clues about the rehidden idol. At Tribal Council, it was admitted openly that Yau-Man had the hidden Immunity Idol and that Alex and Mookie were on the outside. The six-person alliance held to their plan of splitting their vote between Mookie and Alex, but Alex voted against Mookie to successfully avoid a tie. Mookie became the fifth member of the jury, leaving Alex the sole outsider remaining.
211	12	"A Smile, Velvet Gloves and a Dagger in My Pocket"	May 3, 2007	13.74	4.6/14
Alex went into self-declared "ninja" mode trying to stay out of everybody's way and just observing the others looking for possible ways to continue in the game. Cassandra, Earl, and Yau-Man discussed the options for who is the fourth member of the "Core Four" alliance with Cassandra and Earl preferring Dreamz and Yau-Man preferring Stacy.: Reward Challenge: Using only their teeth, Survivors will rip pieces of meat off large chunks of pork, filling their individual plates. The three with the most meat (by weight) on their plates after five minutes wins a trip to a Fijian rain forest for a river rafting adventure. The person with the most meat on their plate would receive an advantage in the next Immunity Challenge.; At the Reward Challenge, the winner and the first two runners-up were taken on a river rafting excursion. The winner of the challenge also received an advantage to the next Immunity Challenge. Boo won the challenge by a wide margin with Yau-Man and Dreamz as runners-up. Boo selected Earl to go back to Exile Island for a fourth time. In a surprise, the three castaways on the trip received letters from home. Alex noticed the others complaining about Boo being too talkative, so he approached Dreamz about convincing the others to vote Boo out before Alex.: Immunity Challenge: Survivors will race to dig up three climbing steps buried randomly in the sand. The first two people to find their climbing steps and cross the finish line will move on to the final stage. There they will use those climbing steps to ascend to the top of a 12-foot pole and retrieve their flag. The first person to retrieve their flag at the top of the pole wins individual Immunity.; At the Immunity Challenge, Boo's advantage turned out to be a bag of three climbing steps, giving him a free pass to the final round of the challenge, where he was joined by Dreamz and Alex. In the final round, Boo used his climbing steps to help him up the pole while Alex and Dreamz ditched their steps to scale their poles. However, the energy expended by Alex and Dreamz was too much for them to overcome and Boo won individual immunity for the first time. With Boo winning immunity, Alex tried to convince Cassandra, Dreamz, and Earl that now was the time to vote out Yau-Man, but his efforts were for naught and he was unanimously voted out.
212	13	"I Wanna See If I Can Make a Deal"	May 10, 2007	13.77	4.4/14
Boo made himself a hideout near the well to overhear conversations thinking that he would be the next one voted out. Earl discussed with his alliance that Boo would be indeed the next voted out.: Reward Challenge: Split into groups of three and tied together, they will maneuver over a series of see-saws, climb up and through a cargo net tower to a sand pit, dig up a hatchet and chop through a rope to release a box. The first team to release the box wins reward. In addition, those three will also compete against each other in a hatchet-throwing contest for the keys of the 2008 Ford Super Duty. The winning team will drive in the truck, delivering the box as well as a trailer carrying a mobile school office to a local Fijian school. While there, they will have a picnic lunch with the children.; At the Reward Challenge, Boo, Stacy, and Yau-Man won the picnic lunch. Then Yau-Man won the truck, but then dealt it to Dreamz in exchange for Individual Immunity should Dreamz win it at a prospective Final Four. Yau-Man also decided to send himself to Exile Island. In his new truck, Dreamz, Boo, and Stacy delivered school supplies and a teacher's office to the local school as part of the reward. After Dreamz returned from the trip, he plotted with Cassandra and Stacy to vote out Yau-Man after realizing what Yau-Man's strategy was regarding giving him the truck, also noting that the deal wouldn't be broken if he voted out Yau-Man before the Final Four.: Immunity Challenge: On platforms in the ocean, Survivors will toss a ball attached to a rope into a hoop to pull down a balance beam. From there, they'll cross to the finish. The first four will move on and do it again, with the first two to cross moving into the final round. They'll once again lower a balance beam, then move onto another beam to a small perch. Balancing on that perch, they will use a grappling hook to fish for a buoy. The first one to raise their buoy wins Individual Immunity.; At the Immunity Challenge, Boo, Dreamz, Earl, and Yau-Man moved on to the second round. Yau-Man and Boo then moved on to the final round. Boo won immunity for the second time in a row, throwing the alliance's plans into disarray. Earl found the Hidden Immunity Idol using the third clue that Yau-Man received. Feeling bad vibes leading up to Tribal Council and Stacy's hinting that his alliance would split a vote, Yau-Man played his Hidden Immunity Idol. The plans to eliminate Yau-Man backfired as the four votes cast against him were negated, and a surprised Stacy was voted out. Jeff stated that the next Tribal Council will be the last time the Hidden Immunity Idol can be played.
213	14	"You've Got That Puzzled Look"	May 13, 2007	13.63	4.6/13
After Tribal Council, Earl tried to figure out his standing with his alliance after he was kept out of the loop about the plan to vote Yau-Man out.: Immunity Challenge: The castaways will make their way blindfolded through a massive five-section maze. Each will be assigned a uniquely shaped medallion, negotiating the maze till they find a key station. They will feel for the shape that matches their medallion to retrieve their specific key. After making their way to the correct drawbridge they will use their key to unlock it, lower it and cross over to the next section of the maze. If they get lost at any point, there are guide posts in each section of the maze that would help them find their way. The first castaway to get all five keys and cross all five drawbridges wins Immunity.; At the Immunity Challenge, Yau-Man won immunity. Boo tried to stay in the game by trying to persuade Earl and Yau-Man to vote out Dreamz. At Tribal Council, Earl played his Hidden Immunity Idol, but it was not needed as he received no votes. In the end, Boo was voted out.: Immunity Challenge: Survivors will lie on their backs on an elevated plank at an angle holding onto a wooden handle. Making things more difficult, water will stream out of a barrel, making the plank slippery. They would start at a 35° angle at the beginning of the challenge. Every five minutes, Jeff will increase the angle of the plank, making it steeper and harder to hang onto. When they can't hang on any longer, they'll let go and slide down the plank, landing in a pool of water. If the castaway slides down the plank, they would be eliminated from the challenge. The last person hanging on wins Individual Immunity.; The final Immunity Challenge was won by Dreamz when he outlasted Yau-Man. At Tribal Council, Dreamz reneged on his agreement with Yau-Man to hand over the immunity necklace as Dreamz, correctly, felt that if he handed the necklace over, he would be voted out. Dreamz kept the immunity necklace in the end. With Yau-Man's agreement broken, he was voted out. The final 3 enjoyed the traditional Day 39 breakfast and burned down their campsite before heading to the Final Tribal Council. At the Final Tribal Council, the jury saw Dreamz as disloyal and deceptive, Cassandra as greedy and undeserving, and Earl being the only one of the three that played the game respectably.
214	15	"Reunion"	May 13, 2007	11.43	4.1/
Months later, it was revealed that Earl received the unanimous vote of the jury and became the fourteenth Sole Survivor. The 19 castaways return to discuss the season with host, Jeff Probst.

== Voting history ==
	Original tribes						Switched tribes			Merged tribe						
Episode	1	2	3	4		5	6	7	8	9	10	11	12	13	14	
Day	3	6	8	10	11	14	16	19	21	24	27	30	33	36	37	38
Tribe	Ravu	Ravu	Ravu	Moto	Moto	Ravu	Ravu	Ravu	Ravu	Bula Bula	Bula Bula	Bula Bula	Bula Bula	Bula Bula	Bula Bula	Bula Bula
Eliminated	Jessica	Erica	Sylvia	Gary	Liliana	Rita	Anthony	Rocky	Lisi	Michelle	Edgardo	Mookie	Alex	Stacy	Boo	Yau-Man
Votes	6–1–1–1	6–2	4–3–1	Quit (Note: No vote; Gary chose to quit the game due to health problems.)	6–1–1	5–2	5–1	4–2	4–1	3–2	5–3–1	4–3–1	6–1	2–0 (Note: Yau-Man played a hidden Immunity Idol; therefore, four votes against him were not counted.)	4–1	3–1
Voter	Vote															
Earl	Jessica	Exiled (Note: Earl was exiled until after the next Tribal Council, which meant he could not be voted out or participate in the vote.)	Sylvia			Rita				Immune (Note: Boo, Cassandra, Earl, Edgardo, and Yau-Man won the immunity challenge and, as a result, were exempt from attending and voting at that night's Tribal Council.)	Edgardo	Alex	Alex	Stacy	Boo	Yau-Man
Cassandra					Lisi					Immune	Edgardo	Mookie	Alex	~~Yau-Man~~	Boo	Yau-Man
Dreamz					Liliana		Anthony	Rocky	Lisi	Michelle	Mookie	Mookie	Alex	~~Yau-Man~~	Boo	Yau-Man
Yau-Man	Jessica	Erica	Sylvia			Rita				Immune	Edgardo	Alex	Alex	Stacy	Boo	Cassandra
Boo					Liliana					Immune	Edgardo	Mookie	Alex	~~Yau-Man~~	Dreamz	
Stacy					Liliana					Michelle	Edgardo	Alex	Alex	~~Yau-Man~~		
Alex					Liliana		Anthony	Rocky	Lisi	Michelle	Cassandra	Mookie	Yau-Man			
Mookie	Jessica	Erica	Anthony			Rita	Anthony	Lisi	Lisi	Stacy	Cassandra	Boo				
Edgardo					Liliana		Anthony	Rocky	Lisi	Immune	Cassandra					
Michelle	Jessica	Erica	Sylvia			Anthony				Stacy						
Lisi					Liliana		Exiled (Note: Lisi was sent to Exile Island after not being chosen during the first tribe swap. She joined the tribe that lost the next Immunity Challenge: Ravu.)	Rocky	Dreamz							
Rocky	Mookie	Erica	Anthony			Rita	Anthony	Lisi								
Anthony	Jessica	Sylvia	Sylvia			Rita	Rocky									
Rita	Jessica	Erica	Earl			Anthony										
Liliana					Cassandra											
Gary				Quit												
Sylvia	Exiled (Note: Sylvia was given the task of dividing the tribes. As a result, she was sent to Exile Island and joined the tribe that lost the subsequent Immunity Challenge: Ravu.)	Erica	Anthony													
Erica	Yau-Man	Sylvia														
Jessica	Rita															

Jury vote
Episode	15		
Day	39		
Finalist	Earl	Cassandra	Dreamz
Votes	9–0–0		
Juror	Vote		
Yau-Man	Yes		
Boo	Yes		
Stacy	Yes		
Alex	Yes		
Mookie	Yes		
Edgardo	Yes		
Michelle	Yes		
Lisi	Yes		
Rocky	Yes		

== Filming locations ==
Survivor: Fiji was filmed in the eastern region of the Macuata province, on Fiji's second largest island, Vanua Levu, about 15 miles (24 km) from the town of Labasa. Tribal Council, the production camp ("Tent City"), and several challenges were located in close proximity to the village of Vunivutu. Other challenges were held on Katawaqa Island, Tivi Island, Vatudamu Point, and fields along the Wainikoro River. The Moto (and later Bula Bula) tribe lived on a peninsula in Vunivutu Bay, while the Ravu tribe lived on Druadrua Island under much harsher conditions. Exile Island's actual name is Sausau Island. Reward getaways included trips to the Namale Resort and Jean-Michel Cousteau Fiji Islands Resort in the town of Savusavu, as well as a rafting excursion on the Navua River on Fiji's main island of Viti Levu.

== Political turmoil in Fiji ==
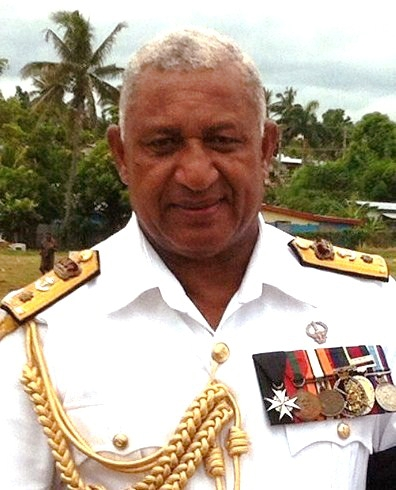
Frank Bainimarama

On December 5, 2006 (two days before the Final Tribal Council), a coup d'état was initiated by Fiji's military leader, Frank Bainimarama. While there was some speculation that a full evacuation of the Survivor crew members from Fiji would take place, only a few crew members on the mainland were relocated to the second-smallest island. However, the political turmoil prior to the coup did prevent the families of the cast members from coming to Fiji to participate in a reward challenge (as usually occurs on Survivor) that occurred towards the end of filming.

== Reception ==
Survivor: Fiji was met with generally negative reception. Entertainment Weekly columnist Dalton Ross ranked Fiji as the third-worst season of the series, only better than Nicaragua and Island of the Idols, saying "With the exception of Yau-Man and Earl, a true bummer of a cast, and the 'Haves vs. Have-Nots' twist was one of the worst creative decisions in Survivor history." In 2010, host Jeff Probst, also ranked it as the third-worst season ahead of Survivor: Marquesas and Survivor: Thailand, cited Yau-Man and Dreamz as the only good things about the season, and had it not been for them, Fiji would've ranked lower on his list than Thailand. Fiji is ranked as the worst season of all time by Examiner.com, and the fourth-worst season by Zap2it, only behind Survivor: Vanuatu, Thailand, and Survivor: Redemption Island. From 2012 to 2014, Survivor fan site "Survivor Oz" consistently ranked Fiji in the bottom four worst seasons in its annual polls ranking every season of the series; In 2012, it was 4th-worst ahead of Thailand, Nicaragua, and Redemption Island, and in 2013 and 2014, it was the 3rd-worst ahead of Survivor: South Pacific and Redemption Island. In 2015, a poll by Rob Has a Podcast ranked Fiji as the fifth-worst season of the series, only ahead of Nicaragua, Thailand, One World, and Redemption Island, with Rob Cesternino ranking this season 25th out of 30. This was updated in 2021 during Cesternino's podcast, Survivor All-Time Top 40 Rankings, ranking 28th out of 40th. That same year, however, Kristen Kranz of Collider gave the season a positive review and ranked Fiji as the 10th best season of the series. She also wrote that the big move made by Herd saved the season from being mediocre, praised Chan's gameplay, and said that Cole was a "great, deserving winner." In 2024, Nick Caruso of TVLine ranked this season 40th out of 47.
