= Reality Obsessed =

Reality Obsessed is a Canadian half-hour documentary television series produced by Peace Point Entertainment Group that airs on TVtropolis. In each episode, host Murtz Jaffer attempts to demystify the underpinnings of reality television by trying to recreate events that took place on Big Brother, American Idol, The Apprentice and numerous other American reality television series past and present.

The series has featured many reality television stars, including Brian Drolet from The Hills and Damage Control, Johnny Fairplay from Survivor, Dave Olsen from Beauty and the Geek, and Jason Peoples from Average Joe. Greg Fisher and Derek Treffry composed the music for Reality Obsessed.

Reality Obsessed had 13 episodes in its first season. A second season aired in 2010.
