= Jonny Fairplay =

American professional wrestler and television personality

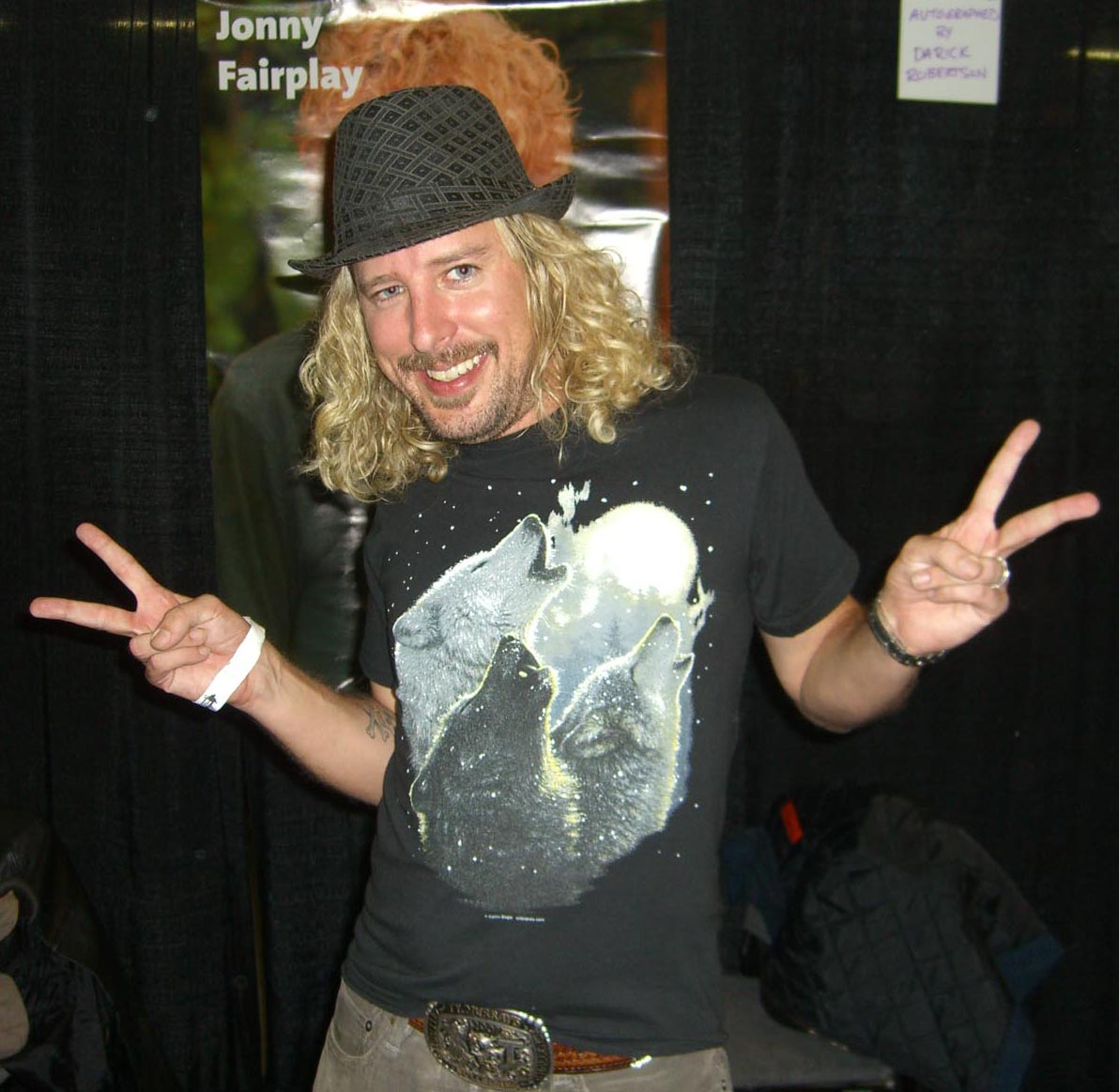
- Dalton at the Big Apple Convention in Manhattan, October 17, 2009
- Born: Jon Dalton; March 11, 1974 (age 52)
- Television: Survivor: Pearl Islands; Survivor: Micronesia
- Spouse: Michelle Deighton (m. 2008; div. 2013)
- Children: 2
- Professional wrestling career
- Ring name: Jonny Fairplay
- Billed height: 6 ft 1 in (185 cm)
- Billed from: Danville, Virginia, U.S.
- Trained by: Roddy Piper
- Debut: 1998
- Website: jonnyfairplay.com

Jonny Fairplay (born Jon Dalton; March 11, 1974) is an American former art consultant, professional wrestler, and reality television personality. He has twice competed on the reality competition TV show Survivor, coming in third place on the seventh season, Survivor: Pearl Islands and coming in last at twentieth place on the sixteenth season, Survivor: Micronesia.

== Early life ==
Jon Dalton was born March 11, 1974, and is originally from Danville, Virginia. He attended George Washington High School, and subsequently attended Virginia Tech. After college, he moved to Washington, D.C., and Portland, Oregon, before settling in Los Angeles.

== Reality television ==
=== Survivor: Pearl Islands ===
On Survivor: Pearl Islands, Dalton constructed what host Jeff Probst called "the greatest lie in Survivor history." Prior to leaving for Panama to compete on the show, Dalton concocted a plan with a close friend of his named Dan, whom Dalton had designated to participate in a challenge that would involve contestants' loved ones. To generate sympathy for Dalton and give him an advantage in the game, Dan would dishonestly inform Dalton that his grandmother had died. In the season's eleventh episode, Dan did so in front of the remaining competitors, who allowed a seemingly distraught Dalton to win the challenge in order to give him the opportunity to spend time with Dan and obtain more information about his grandmother's alleged death. Though the remaining contestants would not discover the truth until after the season had completed filming, it was quickly revealed to the television audience that Dalton's grandmother had not died but was, in fact, at home "watching Jerry Springer". Dalton's grandmother actually died on February 7, 2025, in Myrtle Beach, South Carolina.

Probst also publicly said:

... [then] you have Jonny Fairplay, who's completely despicable. It was actually fun to work with Fairplay on the show because he's a producer's dream. When he shows up drunk or flips somebody off, he's bringing you gold every time. I wish we had a Jonny Fairplay every season. Personally, however, he's an absolute jackass whose actions at the Vanuatu finale after-party pissed me off so much that he's banned from any event that I'm at from now on. I'm done with Jonny Fairplay.

=== Danny Bonaduce altercation ===
On October 2, 2007, at the Fox Reality Really Awards, Dalton was invited to present an award and was loudly booed by the audience while speaking on stage. Actor and political commentator Danny Bonaduce approached Dalton on stage and said, "They're booing because they hate you." As Bonaduce then began walking away, Dalton called to him to return, then Dalton leaped into his arms, wrapped his arms around Bonaduce, and held on, causing Bonaduce to react by flipping Dalton over his head and dropping him to the floor hard on his face. Dalton immediately left the stage, visibly bleeding from his face and allegedly losing a number of teeth.

In an interview with website TMZ soon after, Dalton stated that he had filed a police report over the incident and that authorities were waiting to review video of the incident before pressing battery charges against Bonaduce. On October 5, 2007, three days after the incident, Los Angeles Deputy District Attorney Jeffrey Boxer announced that Bonaduce would not be facing charges, stating that there was "insufficient evidence" that Bonaduce's actions were criminal. Boxer noted that Bonaduce's actions "fell within the realm of self-defense", as Dalton had initiated the physical conflict.

At the 2008 Fox Reality Really Awards, Dalton and Bonaduce appeared together onstage and joked about the previous year's incident. In a scripted scene, Dalton kissed Bonaduce on the lips, and Bonaduce subsequently spit an object out of his mouth which he joked was another one of Dalton's teeth.

=== Survivor: Micronesia ===
On January 3, 2008, it was announced that Fairplay was the only pre-All-Stars castaway who accepted an offer to join the tribe of returning contestants in Survivor: Micronesia – Fans vs. Favorites, the show's 16th season. However, Fairplay asked his tribe to vote him off in the first episode so that he could return to his pregnant girlfriend.

=== Subsequent Survivor appearances ===
Fairplay did not participate in Survivor: Heroes vs. Villains in 2010. When asked about the reason for this, Jeff Probst remarked, "The reason that Fairplay isn't here is that this season is called Heroes vs. Villains, not Survivor Quitters." Fairplay acknowledged in a 2010 interview that there is animosity between himself and Probst, stating, "It's no secret that Jeff Probst hates me, and I don't go out of my way to be his friend either."

In 2013, Fairplay was inducted into the Xfinity "Survivor Hall of Fame," alongside Kim Spradlin and John Cochran. Fairplay was the only non-winner inducted into the Class of 2013.

=== Other appearances ===
Dalton and his wife Michelle appeared on The Celebrity Newlywed Game, on which he beat the Monkees' Davy Jones and his wife; as well as on Dr. Phil in an episode titled "Reality TV Stars' Real Life Drama". He has also appeared on Celebrity Poker Showdown, Celebrity Fear Factor, Pawn Stars, and Camp Reality.

Dalton is also under contract with Wizard World to appear at its comic book conventions.

On March 29, 2022, he appeared as a plaintiff on Judge Steve Harvey against wrestling promoter Ronnie Gossett.

In May 2023, Fairplay competed as a celebrity tribe captain in the second season of the NMB Celebrity Survivor Challenge. He was the 3rd person voted out of the game, placing 13th.

In 2023, he participated in the reality competition show House of Villains on E!, finishing in fourth place.

On October 1, 2025, Dalton was eliminated on the Fox game show The Floor.

== Professional wrestling career ==
Dalton started in professional wrestling in 1998 in North Carolina and then moved to Oregon where, as Jonny Fairplay, he started his own promotion, New Dimension Wrestling (not to be confused with a similarly named Carolinas' promotion with which he claimed to be affiliated). There he served as promoter and commentator. During this time, he also ran his own weekly online professional wrestling radio talk show, having various wrestlers on as guest commentators. He worked as a personal assistant for Roddy Piper for a year and a half prior to Survivor.

After his first Survivor appearance, Dalton was signed to Total Nonstop Action Wrestling, where he appeared under the Jonny Fairplay moniker. In mid January, promo began airing hyping his debut in the company. He made his debut on January 21, but was interrupted by A.J. Styles. The two feuded for several weeks, and on February 25, Fairplay brought in Lex Luger to get revenge on Styles and cost him the NWA World Tag Team Championship. He made brief, non-wrestling appearances in 2005 at both Final Resolution and Destination X.

On October 7, 2006, Fairplay was defeated by Molly Holly after a low blow and quick pin fall at a WCWA event. One month later, Fairplay and the Hardkore Kidd defeated Frankie Kazarian. Dalton also made an appearance in Ring of Honor, on March 31, 2007, in Detroit, Michigan.

On April 1, 2011, Fairplay made an appearance for Dragon Gate USA, endorsing Jimmy Rave as the promotion's next breakout star. After Rave was defeated in a match by Arik Cannon, Fairplay entered the ring, confronted Cannon and got on the receiving end of his finishing maneuver, Total Anarchy.

On May 3, 2011, Fairplay appeared on the debut televised event of WFX Wrestling in a backstage scene in which he swindled U-Gene out of pocket money with a trick reminiscent of his famous Survivor lie. The following week Fairplay convinced U-Gene to sign a contract making Fairplay his 'manager slash best friend' promising to make him the biggest star in reality television. On the third episode of Overload, Fairplay is overheard by U-Gene while bragging about having stole all of his money. After chasing Fairplay to ringside, U-Gene was physically attacked by Fairplay before he revealed he had used his money to help male bodybuilder and former Big Brother contestant Jessie Godderz join the roster of WFX.

Starting in May 2014, Fairplay has appeared in the West Coast Wrestling Connection as the on-screen manager of Ashton Vuitton.

As of 2026, he is the BRCW Cruiserweight Championship in Boca Raton, Florida since March 2025.

== Personal life ==
As of March 2021, Dalton lives in his native Danville, Virginia.

Dalton and his girlfriend, Michelle Deighton, a contestant from WWE Tough Enough 2011 and the fourth season of America's Next Top Model, had a daughter born in 2008, and lived in Providence, North Carolina. Dalton announced that he was separating from Deighton on June 28, 2011, via Twitter. The couple divorced in April 2013.

Dalton later dated Caryn Finkbeiner, with whom he has a daughter born on May 20, 2017, and Jessica Kendrick, to whom he has been engaged since 2023.

On December 18, 2020, Dalton and his mother Patsy Hall were arrested on larceny charges. According to the Danville, Virginia Police Department's report, they were accused of stealing jewelry and furniture valued at $5,000 from Dalton's grandmother, Jean Cook, following a criminal complaint filed by Dalton's disgruntled aunt. Charges against both people were dismissed due to insufficient evidence on March 25, 2021.

== Championships and accomplishments ==
- Boca Raton Championship Wrestling
  - BRCW Cruiserweight Championship (1 time, current)

== Filmography ==
Year	Show	Role	Notes
2003	Survivor: Pearl Islands	Himself	Contestant (3rd place)
2004	50 Most Outrageous TV Moments	Himself	TV Special
2004	The Daily Buzz	Himself	1 episode
2005	Kill Reality	Himself	Main Cast - 8 episodes
2005	The Scorned	D.Q	TV Movie
2005	Family Feud	Himself	3 episodes
2005	Inked	Himself	Season 2, episode 1 "Trouble In Paradise"
2005	Celebrity Poker Showdown	Himself	1 episode
2006	True Life	Himself	Episode "I'm a reality Star"
2006	Fear Factor	Himself	3 episodes
2007	Judge Mathis	Himself	1 episode
2007	Camp Reality	Himself	Contestant - 6 episodes
2007	Ty Murray's Celebrity Bull Riding Challenge	Himself	3 episodes
2007	Fox Reality TV Really Awards	Himself	TV Special
2008	Entertainment Tonight	Himself	1 episode
2008	TNA Wrestling: Destination X	Himself	TV Special
2008	Survivor: Micronesia	Himself	Contestant (20th place)
2008–2010	Reality Obsessed	Himself	3 episodes
2008	I Love the New Millennium	Himself	TV Special
2009	The Celebrity Newlywed Game	Himself	1 episode
2010	25 Most Shocking Reality TV Moments of All Time	Himself	TV Special
2011	WWE Tough Enough	Himself	1 episode (voice)
2011–present	WFX Overload	Himself	
2011	Dr. Phil	Himself	Episode "Reality TV Stars Real Drama"
2012	Judge Alex	Himself	
2014–present	West Coast Wrestling Connection	Himself	
2014	E! True Hollywood Story	Himself	
2016	The Beauty and the Beast Show	Himself	
2022	Judge Steve Harvey	Himself	1 episode
2023	NMB Celebrity Survivor Challenge	Himself	Contestant - season 2 (13th place)
2023	House of Villains	Himself	Contestant - season 1 (4th place)
2025	The Floor	Himself	Contestant - season 4 (92nd place)
