= Elyse Umemoto =

American dance team manager and former Miss Washington

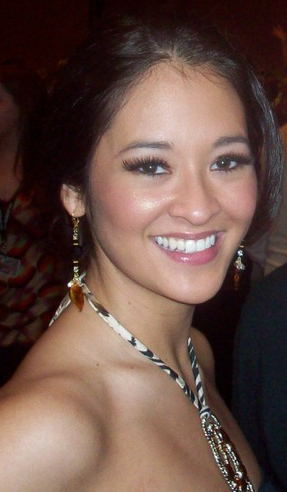
- Headshot of Umemoto as Miss Washington (2007)
- Born: May 10, 1984 (age 42)
- Education: Pacific Lutheran University
- Occupations: Beauty pageant winner, dance team manager, television personality
- Height: 5 ft 4 in (163 cm)
- Title: Miss Pierce County 2006; Miss Seattle 2007; Miss Washington 2007
- Term: 2007
- Predecessor: Kristen Eddings
- Successor: Janet Harding

Elyse Umemoto (born May 10, 1984) is an American dance team manager and former Miss Washington in the Miss America circuit. She is known for finishing third place at Miss America 2008, and for competing on the reality competition show Survivor, following her stint as Miss Washington.

== Early life ==
Umemoto grew up in Wapato, Washington, with her three younger sisters, Lauren, Cheyne & Shelian LameBull and her parents, Step-Father, Francis LameBull and Luana Lumley. Her biological Father, Gary Umemoto living in Seattle and visited as work would allow. She attended Wapato High School, where she played soccer and tennis, and performed as a cheerleader. She graduated in 2001. Later, she enrolled at Pacific Lutheran University, double-majoring in psychology and political science.

Umemoto is of German, Japanese, Hispanic, and Native American origin. She is an enrolled member of the Yakama tribe.

== Miss America pageant ==
While in college, one of Umemoto's friends suggested that she enter a beauty pageant. Her first such pageant was Miss Pierce County 2006. She won, and went on to finish as first runner-up at Miss Washington 2006 that year. One year later, as Miss Seattle 2007, she won the Miss Washington 2007 crown and the right to represent the state at Miss America 2008. Her platform at Miss America was "Embracing Diversity, Empowering Women." For the talent competition, she sang "Angels" by British singer/songwriter Robbie Williams.

On the night of the pageant telecast, Umemoto finished second runner-up, behind first runner-up Nicole Rash of Indiana and Miss America 2008 Kirsten Haglund of Michigan. Umemoto's finish was tied for the highest ever by a Miss Washington delegate. For her efforts, she earned a US$20,000 scholarship, plus an additional US$10,000 for placing in the Top Three of the pre-pageant reality show Miss America: Reality Check.

== Personal life ==
In the Spring 2008, Umemoto revealed that she had been the victim of domestic violence. Her boyfriend had violently assaulted her at her home in Tacoma, shortly after the Miss America pageant took place. She immediately reported the incident to Pierce County Sheriff's Department, and the now ex-boyfriend went on to plead guilty to a domestic violence charge. He was sentenced to community service.

The week before she was to crown her successor as Miss Washington, Umemoto held a press conference to address a controversy over suggestive photos of her that had been leaked and published by TMZ. At the press gathering, she apologized for photos in which she was seen playing a college drinking games and making suggestive hand gestures while wearing her pageant crown. She stated that those photos were taken in private and had been stolen from her in violation of her trust. Ultimately, pageant officials decided not to discipline her for the photos.

== Career ==
Following her stint as Miss Washington, Umemoto moved to Las Vegas, Nevada, where she starting working as the manager of a dance team.

== Survivor ==
In 2011, Umemoto was one of 18 people selected for the cast of Survivor: South Pacific, the series' 23rd season overall. At the start of the game, she was placed on the Savaii tribe, the most notable member of which was Ozzy Lusth, a two-time returning player and one of two returnees that season (the other being Benjamin "Coach" Wade of the opposing tribe, Upolu). Umemoto would later form a tight bond with Lusth, becoming part of his alliance along with Jim Rice, Keith Tollefson, and Whitney Duncan. By Episode Four, however, Rice became leery of Umemoto and Lusth's relationship, and along with John Cochran, hatched a plan to eliminate her. But Savaii would go on to win the next immunity challenge on Day 11, meaning that she would remain safe that night. On Day 14, though, Savaii lost the immunity challenge, and both Rice and Cochran convinced Dawn Meehan to join them in blindsiding Umemoto.

At that night's Tribal Council, Umemoto was indeed voted out, but not immediately eliminated. As this was a Redemption Island season, she was sent to Redemption Island to join Christine Shields-Markoski, who had been voted out nine days earlier and had won the first three elimination duels of the season. For the next such duel, Umemoto and Shields-Markoski battled each other in a shuffleboard-style game. Each combatant started out with four pucks of her own on the board, and the object was to slide neutral pucks to the other side in an attempt to become the first to knock all of the opponent's pucks off the board. Shields-Markoski won the duel, her fourth in a row, and Umemoto became the fourth person eliminated from the game, finishing 15th place overall.
