= Zach Adams =

Zach Adams might refer to:

- Zach Adams, video game producer, known for Dwarf Fortress
- Zach Adams, implicated in the Holly Bobo murder case
