= Whitney Duncan =

American singer and songwriter

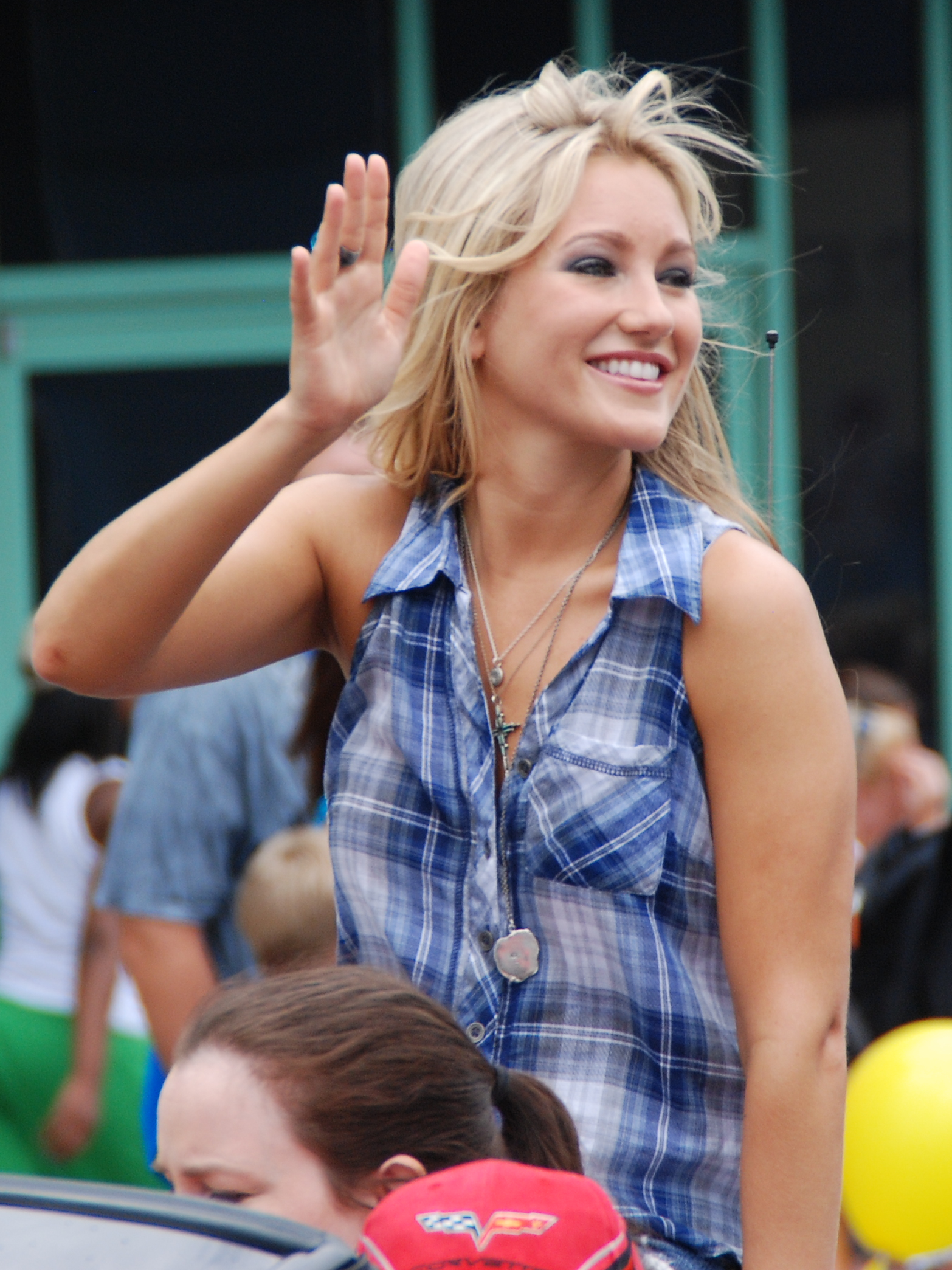
- Duncan at the 2010 CMA Music Festival

Background information
- Born: August 3, 1984 (age 41)
- Origin: Scotts Hill, Tennessee, United States
- Genres: Country
- Occupations: Singer; songwriter
- Instruments: Vocals; guitar
- Years active: 2004–present
- Label: Warner Bros. Nashville
- Spouses: Donny Fallgatter (m. 2010; div. 2011) Keith Tollefson (m. 2014)

Whitney Duncan (born August 3, 1984) is an American country music singer and songwriter. She finished as the fifth place finalist on the fifth season of Nashville Star. She has released one studio album and has charted on the U.S. Hot Country Songs chart with "When I Said I Would" and "Skinny Dippin'," as well as a Christmas single and guest appearance on a Kenny Rogers single which was released before her Nashville Star appearance. In the fall of 2011, Duncan competed on the 23rd season of Survivor, Survivor: South Pacific, where she ultimately finished in 9th place, becoming the fourth member of the jury. In the fall of 2014, Duncan and her then-fiancé, fellow Survivor: South Pacific castaway Keith Tollefson, competed together on the 25th season of The Amazing Race, where they placed in 8th place.

== Early life ==
Duncan was born on August 3, 1984, in Scotts Hill, Tennessee, a town consisting of only 900 people. Her father is a state environmentalist and her mother is a schoolteacher. Her grandfather introduced her to music. Duncan began singing at her church, later performing in local talent shows, fairs, and festivals. She would also travel to the neighboring states of Kentucky and Missouri to perform at events. In her early teens, she began to travel to Nashville to perform at local clubs, including Tootsie's Orchid Lounge.

== Music career ==
In her senior year of high school, Duncan signed a recording contract with a label, cutting a few songs she had written. One of these songs was "My World Is Over", which became a duet with Kenny Rogers, and appeared on his 42 Ultimate Hits album in 2004. A single was made of their duet, and charted for one week on the Billboard Hot Country Songs chart in July 2004. Afterwards, Duncan parted ways with the label. In 2006, she opened for the CMA Music festival, performing the national anthem and singing the next day as well.

In 2007, Duncan participated on the USA network show Nashville Star and self-released her debut album. After coming in fifth place, she signed to Warner Bros. Records Nashville. Her first solo single, "When I Said I Would" was released from the label in August 2008, peaking at No. 48 on the U.S. country charts. The second single, "The Bed You Made," followed in December 2008 and failed to chart. The third single, "Skinny Dippin" was released in July 2009, and debuted at No. 60 and reached No. 48 as well. A Christmas digital single, a cover version of the Mariah Carey hit "All I Want for Christmas Is You", was issued in November 2008. A digital EP titled Selections From Right Road Now was released in December 2008.

Duncan's debut album, Right Road Now, was originally slated for a May 2009 release, but was pushed back due to the lackluster success of the singles. The album was released digitally and through Amazon.com on compact disc on April 20, 2010.

Duncan's song "So Sorry Mama" is featured in the 2011 movie Footloose, and on its soundtrack. She sang and co-wrote "So Sorry Mama" with John Shanks and Gordie Sampson. "So Sorry Mama" was also on her Right Road Now CD released on Warner Brothers in 2010. Duncan released a new single called "That's How You Make Love" on July 31, 2012.

In 2016, Duncan founded the band Post Monroe with Ashlee Hewitt and Shelby McLeod but in late 2017 the band became a duo after Shelby departed the group.

== Survivor ==
Beginning September 2011, Duncan appeared as a contestant on the CBS reality television series, Survivor: South Pacific, as part of the Savaii tribe. Duncan quickly formed a very close, romantic bond with her fellow tribemate Keith Tollefson, and the two teamed up with Jim Rice and another pair within the tribe—Ozzy Lusth and Elyse Umemoto—early on in the game. At the urging of Rice, Duncan cooperated in the elimination of Umemoto to limit Lusth's power.

At the merge, Duncan and the rest of the old Savaiis were betrayed by former tribemate John Cochran, which led to the entire former Savaii tribe being voted out one by one. Duncan herself was voted out on Day 27 after having barely lost a challenge that would have kept her safe for another round; Duncan and another one of her former Savaii colleagues Dawn Meehan then lost the Redemption Island duel the next day against Lusth, officially eliminating both Duncan and Meehan from the game. Duncan finished ninth overall and was the fourth member of the jury, where she was later one of the six jury members who voted for Sophie Clarke to win the season.

Several years later, in the official issue of CBS Watch magazine commemorating the 15th anniversary of Survivor, Duncan was voted by viewers as the fifth most attractive female contestant in Survivor history.

== Personal life ==
Duncan was a first cousin to Holly Bobo, who was murdered in 2011, in a case that received national media attention.

Duncan dated actor/musician Christian Kane from approximately 2006 to early 2010. His 2010 song "American Made" makes reference to her as "a Tennessee Girl that will always have a place in my heart." Duncan co-wrote (with her cousin Jonathan Singleton) "Making Circles," which also appeared on Kane's 2010 album, The House Rules.

Duncan married musician Donny Fallgatter on August 1, 2010, in Gatlinburg, Tennessee, after two months of dating. The couple's divorce was granted in November 2011. She became engaged to Keith Tollefson on February 14, 2013. The two had begun a relationship on their season of Survivor, while Duncan was married to Fallgatter. In May 2014, Duncan appeared on TLC's Say Yes to the Dress, where she chose a wedding dress for her forthcoming nuptials to Tollefson. The two married in July 2014. Whitney had her first child in 2022 with Keith Tollefson

She and Tollefson, as an engaged couple, raced together on The Amazing Race 25, where they were the fourth team eliminated on the fifth leg of the race after being U-Turned by the mother/daughter team of Shelley and Nici, finishing in eighth place.

== Discography ==
=== Studio albums ===
| Title | Album details | Peak chart positions | |
| Title | Album details | US Country | US Heat |
|---|---|---|---|
| Whitney Duncan | Release date: June 19, 2007; Label: self released | — | — |
| Right Road Now | Release date: April 20, 2010; Label: Warner Bros. Nashville | 41 | 21 |
| One Shot | Release date: February 12, 2013; Label: self released | — | — |
"—" denotes releases that did not chart

=== Extended plays ===
| Title | Album details |
|---|---|
| Selections from Right Road Now | Release date: December 23, 2008; Label: Warner Bros. Nashville |
| Young in America | Release date: February 11, 2011; Label: Warner Bros. Nashville |
| Heartbreaker | Release date: January 8, 2021; Label: Fire Sign Music |

=== Singles ===
| Year | Single | Peak positions | Album |
| Year | Single | US Country | Album |
|---|---|---|---|
| 2008 | "When I Said I Would" | 48 | Right Road Now |
| 2009 | "The Bed You Made" | — | Right Road Now |
| 2009 | "Skinny Dippin'" | 48 | Right Road Now |
| 2014 | "Roll All Night" | — | —N/a |
"—" denotes releases that did not chart

=== Guest singles ===
| Year | Single | Artist | Peak positions | Album |
| Year | Single | Artist | US Country | Album |
| 2004 | "My World Is Over" | Kenny Rogers | 60 | 42 Ultimate Hits |
| 2010 | "Just Knowing You Love Me" | Jimmy Wayne | 59 | Sara Smile |

=== Other charted songs ===
| Year | Single | Peak positions | Album |
| Year | Single | US Country | Album |
|---|---|---|---|
| 2009 | "All I Want for Christmas Is You" | 60 | Gift Wrapped: 20 Songs That Keep on Giving! |

=== Music videos ===
| Year | Video | Director |
|---|---|---|
| 2004 | "My World Is Over" (with Kenny Rogers) | Shaun Silva |
| 2008 | "When I Said I Would" | Steven Goldmann/Eric Welch |
| 2009 | "Skinny Dippin'" | Roman White |
| 2010 | "Right Road Now" | Trey Fanjoy |
| 2014 | "Roll All Night" | Marcel/Whitney Duncan |
| 2020 | "All She Wants" | Jacob Moyer |
| 2020 | "Lightweight" | Jacob Moyer |

== Singles written by Duncan ==
| Year | Title | Artist | Album |
|---|---|---|---|
| 2004 | "My World Is Over" | Kenny Rogers | 42 Ultimate Hits |
| 2006 | "I Found It In You" | Ashley Gearing | Maybe It's Time |
| 2008 | "My Roots Are Showing" | Crystal Shawanda | Dawn of a New Day |
| 2013 | "Young in America" | Danielle Bradbery | Danielle Bradbery |
