= Ozzy Lusth =

American reality show contestant (born 1981)

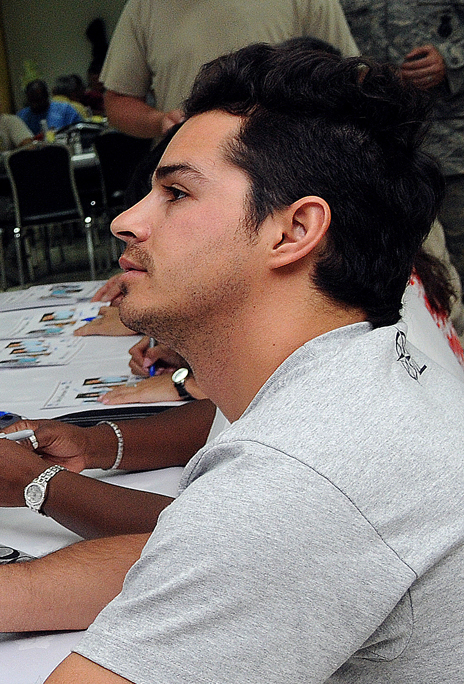
- Lusth on a U.S. military tour in 2008
- Born: August 23, 1981 (age 45); Guanajuato, Mexico
- Television: Survivor: Cook Islands (runner-up); Survivor: Micronesia; Survivor: South Pacific; Survivor: Game Changers; Survivor 50: In the Hands of the Fans

Oscar "Ozzy" Lusth (born August 23, 1981) is an American reality show contestant who has appeared on several shows, including Survivor: Cook Islands; Survivor: Micronesia; Survivor: South Pacific; Survivor: Game Changers; and Survivor 50: In the Hands of the Fans. He also competed on the second season of American Ninja Warrior.

== Early life ==
Lusth was born on August 23, 1981, in Guanajuato, Mexico. When he was only a couple of years old, his parents divorced and he moved with his mother to Durham, North Carolina, to be closer to his relatives. After a few more moves, his mother, with Ozzy and his two siblings, Katrin and Zoe, settled in Mountain View, California. He went to high school in Mountain View. After graduating, he attended Santa Barbara City College for two years, where he worked as a stripper on the side, until he moved to the Los Angeles area. He is of Mestizo descent.

== Survivor ==
=== Cook Islands ===
Lusth was originally recruited to play Survivor after his friend met a casting agent for the show, and they wanted a "non-stereotypical Latino." On Survivor: Cook Islands, Lusth was originally a member of the Aitutaki (Aitu) tribe, which represented Latinos. Having no particular alliance with any members, he was seen as a threat. In Episode Two, he suggested the tribe throw the immunity challenge so they could vote out the weak link, Billy Garcia. Lusth's plan was met with skepticism, particularly by Cristina Coria. However, Garcia was voted out at Tribal Council. Following a tribe switch, Lusth remained in Aitu with only one of his original tribemates, Cecelia Mansilla. Lusth was perceived a threat but he led his tribes to numerous immunities. Yet he was not part of the dominating alliance of Yul Kwon, Candice Woodcock, Becky Lee, and Jonathan Penner, and Lusth lost his original tribemate, Mansilla. Following the third tribal council, Lusth was angry that his tribe had voted for Mansilla, but was comforted by his tribemates. After two straight wins, Probst announced both tribes would go to Tribal Council. Lusth, along with the rest of the tribe except Jessica "Flicka" Smith, denounced "Plan Voodoo" and voted out Cao Boi Bui. The tribe lost immunity at the next challenge and Smith was unanimously voted out.

Lusth played a large part in the next three straight wins and the Rarotonga (Raro) tribe saw their numbers dwindle. However, when Probst announced an offer of mutiny, the Aitu tribe was left shocked and decimated as original Raro members Woodcock and Penner returned, thus making Raro eight members strong. The challenge following the mutiny was dominated by the Aitu Four: Sundra Oakley, Lusth, Kwon and Lee. Lusth and the Aitu Four sent Woodcock to Exile Island several times, eventually sealing her fate and Penner's. The mutiny sealed Lusth in his alliance with Oakley, Kwon, and Lee, and the Aitu Four dominated subsequent challenges. Following the tribe merge, Lusth remained loyal to the Aitu Four and voted with his allies to send Nate Gonzalez, Woodcock, Penner, Parvati Shallow, and Adam Gentry off, despite times when he considered aligning with Shallow. Lusth was seen as a threat by allies Lee and Oakley, who went to Kwon in an attempt to vote Lusth out. But Lusth won immunity once again, forcing the expulsion of former Raro members.

Lusth won the final immunity challenge and scored a spot in the Final Three with Kwon, who had the hidden immunity idol. Forced to vote one of their own out, Lee and Oakley tied with two votes against each. Lee won the fire-making tiebreaker, securing a spot with Kwon and Lusth. At the final Tribal Council, Lusth was praised for his athletic skills but criticized for being a loner. He finished in second place in a 5–4–0 vote and was the first male runner-up in two years since the eighth season. Probst stated at the reunion show that he had dominated. Prior to the million dollar vote, Adam Gentry had promised he would give Kwon his vote if he survived longer than Penner. Kwon did and Gentry followed suit. Lusth gained the votes of Raro members Shallow, Gonzalez, Jenny Guzon-Bae and Rebecca Borman.

Lusth was the longest-lasting contestant from the original Aitu tribe, and stayed so after the tribe switch. Dominant in swimming, agility and balance, he won five out of six individual immunity challenges. He won a Mercury Mariner for being voted favorite player of the season.

With five immunity challenge wins in Cook Islands, Lusth became the fourth player, after Colby Donaldson, Tom Westman and Terry Deitz, to win a record five immunity challenges in a single season. Since then, Mike Holloway on Survivor: Worlds Apart, and Brad Culpepper on Survivor: Game Changers have also accomplished this feat.

=== Micronesia ===
Survivor: Micronesia — Fans vs. Favorites was Lusth's second appearance on Survivor. With regard to his prior appearance, Lusth commented, "My mistakes last time were basically being too much of a loner. I'm never going to go anywhere by myself except to use the bathroom".

Originally part of the Malakal tribe representing the Favorites, Lusth decided to establish alliances. He allied himself with Amanda Kimmel, a Survivor: China contestant. The two went on to join forces with James Clement, Kimmel's ally from China, and Parvati Shallow, Lusth's fellow contestant on Cook Islands. The four became known for the romantic relationships between Lusth and Kimmel and between Clement and Shallow, with Cirie Fields joking that Kimmel would be giving birth to "little Ozzlets." The tribe faced an early defeat and the alliance of four found themselves against another dominating alliance of Ami Cusack, Jonathan Penner, Eliza Orlins and Yau-Man Chan. Both alliances attempted to recruit Jonny Fairplay, whose vote would become the swing vote. However, things changed when Fairplay asked to be sent home to be with his pregnant girlfriend, and the tribe honored his wish and voted him out 9–1, with Fairplay voting for Lusth. Faced with a loss in Episode Three, the four recruited Fields as their fifth member and voted out Chan, who was perceived as a threat by her. In Episode Four, Lusth was banished to Exile Island where he found the immunity idol and put a fake one in the place where he found the real one.

Following a tribal switch in Episode Five, he remained with two of his alliance members, Kimmel and Fields. The tribe began to lose in immunity challenges and subsequently voted off the Fans: Joel Anderson, Chet Welch, and Tracy Hughes-Wolf; during this time, Penner, now a member of Airai, was evacuated and Kathy Sleckman quit. With the tribe numbers becoming even, Malakal lost the challenge before the merge and voted off Cusack. When Lusth reunited with his alliance at the merge, the five of them took control of the game, voting off Orlins, whom Shallow disliked. He became comfortable with his position in the game, trusting Kimmel, Clement, and Shallow completely. He also found an ally in Fan Erik Reichenbach, who admired Lusth's abilities. However, Shallow had plans of her own. Having aligned herself with Fans Natalie Bolton and Alexis Jones while on Airai, she found herself in trouble when Fields approached her with a plan to blindside Lusth. Shallow's vote became the swing vote and she was confused, debating whether or not to vote her ally out. But Shallow stuck with Fields and convinced Lusth to leave his idol back at camp. At Tribal Council, Lusth was blindsided and this became the start of the women's alliance's domination, led by Shallow.

At the Final Tribal Council, he berated Shallow for selling away their friendship and refused to let her talk. He also confessed his love for Kimmel, for whom he cast his vote to win, saying she deserved the money a million times more than Shallow. He and Kimmel were still together as of the reunion show, but he revealed in an interview that they had separated before he returned for Season 23, Survivor: South Pacific. He also revealed at the reunion show that he and Shallow have healed their friendship.

=== South Pacific ===
Lusth returned, along with Benjamin "Coach" Wade, for a third shot at the game in Survivor: South Pacific. He revealed that he wanted to play a strategic game this time, feeling that everyone only saw him as a physical threat in previous games. He was randomly assigned to the Savaii tribe, where he quickly formed a core alliance with Keith Tollefson and Jim Rice, with Whitney Duncan and Elyse Umemoto being the extra members. His increasing closeness with Umemoto prompted Rice to undercut his power in Episode Five by convincing the tribe to vote out Umemoto instead of John Cochran. This initially angered Lusth, but he later forgave his tribe.

As the tribe approached what they suspected was the last Tribal Council before the merge and the return of the Redemption Island victor, Lusth made an unprecedented strategic move by requesting that his tribe vote him out to Redemption Island, in the hope that he would beat long-running Redemption Island resident Christine Shields-Markoski and return to the merged tribe, making the former Savaii numbers equal to the former Upolu members. Jeff Probst has called this one of the greatest moves in Survivor history.

The plan worked, but at the first post-merge Tribal Council Cochran betrayed his own tribe and joined with Upolu in voting out Tollefson, followed by Lusth and his other former tribemates, one by one. Back on Redemption Island, Lusth defeated Tollefson, Rice, Dawn Meehan, Duncan, Cochran, Edna Ma, and Brandon Hantz to stay in the game. Ozzy won immunity when he got back into the game and Rick Nelson was voted off. However, in the next challenge Lusth was defeated by Sophie Clarke at a puzzle game and became the last person voted off to become the final member of the jury. He later cast his vote for Clarke to win. He did, however, win the $100,000 Sprint Player of the Season prize over Cochran, who came in a distant second. Lusth was also the last member of the original Savaii tribe and set a Survivor record in being voted out three times in one season.

=== Game Changers ===
Lusth returned for a fourth time in the 34th season, Survivor: Game Changers. This made him one of only four contestants at the time to ever compete on Survivor four times—the others being "Boston Rob" Mariano, Rupert Boneham, and fellow Game Changers contestant Cirie Fields. On Day 16, Lusth attended his first Tribal Council, where he joined the majority in voting out two-time winner Sandra Diaz-Twine. He had to go to Tribal Council again on Day 18, when he joined the others in unanimously in eliminating Jeff Varner, after Varner outed contestant Zeke Smith during council. He was ultimately blindsided on Day 24 for being too big of a physical threat. He placed 12th and was the second member of the jury. At Final Tribal Council, he praised finalist Brad Culpepper for his gameplay and voted for Culpepper to win, although Sarah Lacina would ultimately win the title of "Sole Survivor."

=== In the Hands of the Fans ===
Lusth returned for the show's 50th season, Survivor 50: In the Hands of the Fans, which premiered on February 25, 2026. He was voted out in the season's 11th episode and took 8th place after a vote of 4-1 with a Billie Eilish Boomerang Idol in his pocket. (The conceit of the Billie Eilish Boomerang Idol, that it would "boomerang" back to the player who gifted it to him after he was voted out, did not occur, since Genevieve Mushaluk had been voted out in episode 6.) Ozzy was voted out in the 2nd tribal council in episode 11 after many events unfolded which caused the target to go from castmate Aubry Bracco to him. He would go on to vote for Bracco to win the 2 Million Dollar Prize. (As it was increased by a MrBeast twist from 1 million dollars)

=== Accolades ===
Shortly after Survivor: South Pacific ended, Ozzy was inducted into Xfinity's Survivor "Hall of Fame" in the class of 2011, alongside Cirie Fields and Tom Westman. Several years later, in the official issue of CBS Watch magazine commemorating the 15th anniversary of Survivor, Lusth performed well in two major viewer polls that were released in the magazine. He came in fifth in the poll for "Greatest Castaway of All Time," and he came in third in the "Hottest Male Castaway" poll, behind Colby Donaldson and Malcolm Freberg. He was also the only male contestant to appear in both polls, and one of only two contestants overall to appear in both the "greatest players" poll and one of the "most attractive" polls, the other being fellow Cook Islands and Micronesia contestant Parvati Shallow. Lastly, his elimination in Episode Ten of Micronesia was voted by viewers in the same magazine as the #2 most memorable moment in the series, only behind Sandra Diaz-Twine burning Russell Hantz's hat in Episode 14 of Survivor: Heroes vs. Villains.

By making the merge in Survivor: Game Changers, Lusth became the first and only player in Survivor history to make the merge four times, and Lusth also holds the record for the most times eliminated from the game, by being voted out on five occasions (one in Micronesia, three in South Pacific, and one in Game Changers). At the time of his participation, he holds the record for the most time spent playing Survivor, with 128 days spent in the game as an active contestant followed by Fields who played 121 days, Rob Mariano who played 117 days, Shallow who played 114 days, Amanda Kimmel who played 108 days, Rupert Boneham who played 104 days, and Andrea Boehlke who played 103 days;. This record lasted for nearly three years, to be surpassed later by Mariano, who eventually played 152 days (excluding the 37 days in Survivor: Island of the Idols, for which he was not directly involved in the gameplay), and Shallow's 149, both for their participation in Survivor: Winners at War.

In 2016, he also appeared in a special episode of The Price Is Right which featured multiple former Survivor contestants competing on the show.

== Personal life ==
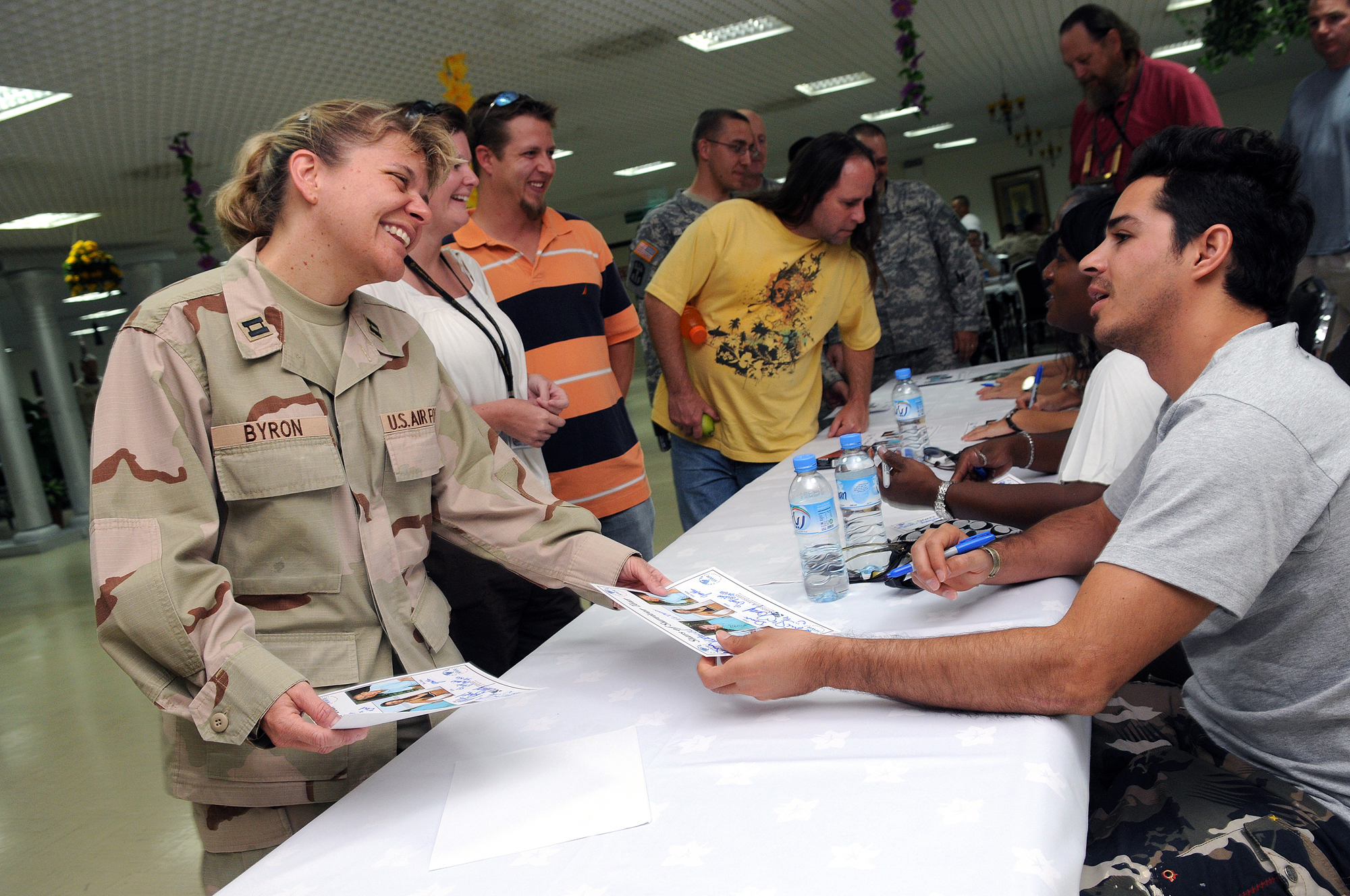
Lusth signing autographs at Camp As Sayliyah in 2008

As of 2022, he has been producing adult content on OnlyFans, after having done so previously on the Playboy TV series Foursome. Lusth came out as bisexual in 2022. As of 2025, Lusth lives in Guanajuato in Mexico.

== Filmography ==
=== Television ===
Year	Title	Role	Notes
2006	Foursome	Contestant	1 episode
2006	Survivor: Cook Islands	Contestant	Runner-up
2008	Survivor: Micronesia	Contestant	Eliminated; 9th place
2011	Survivor: South Pacific	Contestant	Eliminated; 4th place
2016	The Price Is Right	Guest	1 episode
2017	Survivor: Game Changers	Contestant	Eliminated; 12th place
2026	Survivor 50: In the Hands of the Fans	Contestant	Eliminated; 8th place

Preceded by Danielle DiLorenzo	Runner-Up of Survivor; Survivor: Cook Islands	Succeeded by Cassandra Franklin & Andria "Dreamz" Herd
