= Survivor: South Pacific =

- Season 23
- Region 1 DVD cover
- Presented by: Jeff Probst
- No. of days: 39
- No. of castaways: 18
- Winner: Sophie Clarke
- Runner-up: Benjamin "Coach" Wade
- Location: Upolu, Samoa
- Sprint Player of the Season: Ozzy Lusth
- No. of episodes: 16

Release
- Original network: CBS
- Original release: September 14 – December 18, 2011

Additional information
- Filming dates: May 30 – July 7, 2011

Season chronology
- ← Previous; Redemption Island Next → One World

Survivor: South Pacific is the twenty-third season of the American CBS competitive reality television series Survivor. The season was filmed from May 30 through July 7, 2011, and premiered on September 14, 2011.

Sophie Clarke was named the winner in the final episode on December 18, 2011, defeating Benjamin "Coach" Wade and Albert Destrade in a 6–3–0 vote. Ozzy Lusth won $100,000 as the "Sprint Player of the Season", winning this honor by the largest margin since the award's inception in Survivor: China, and earning the fans' vote over John Cochran.

== Format ==
Survivor is a reality television show based on the Swedish show Expedition Robinson, created by Mark Burnett and Charlie Parsons. The series follows a number of participants isolated in a remote location, where they must provide food, fire, and shelter. One participant is removed from the series by majority vote every three days, with challenges held to give a reward (ranging from living- and food-related prizes to a car) and immunity from being voted out of the series. The last remaining player receives a prize of $1,000,000.

== Contestants ==
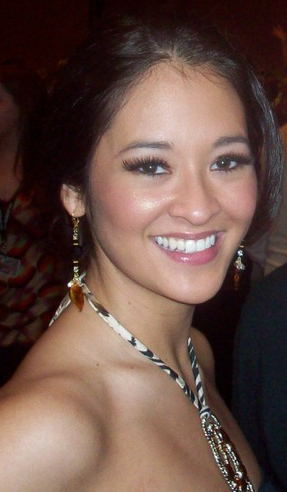
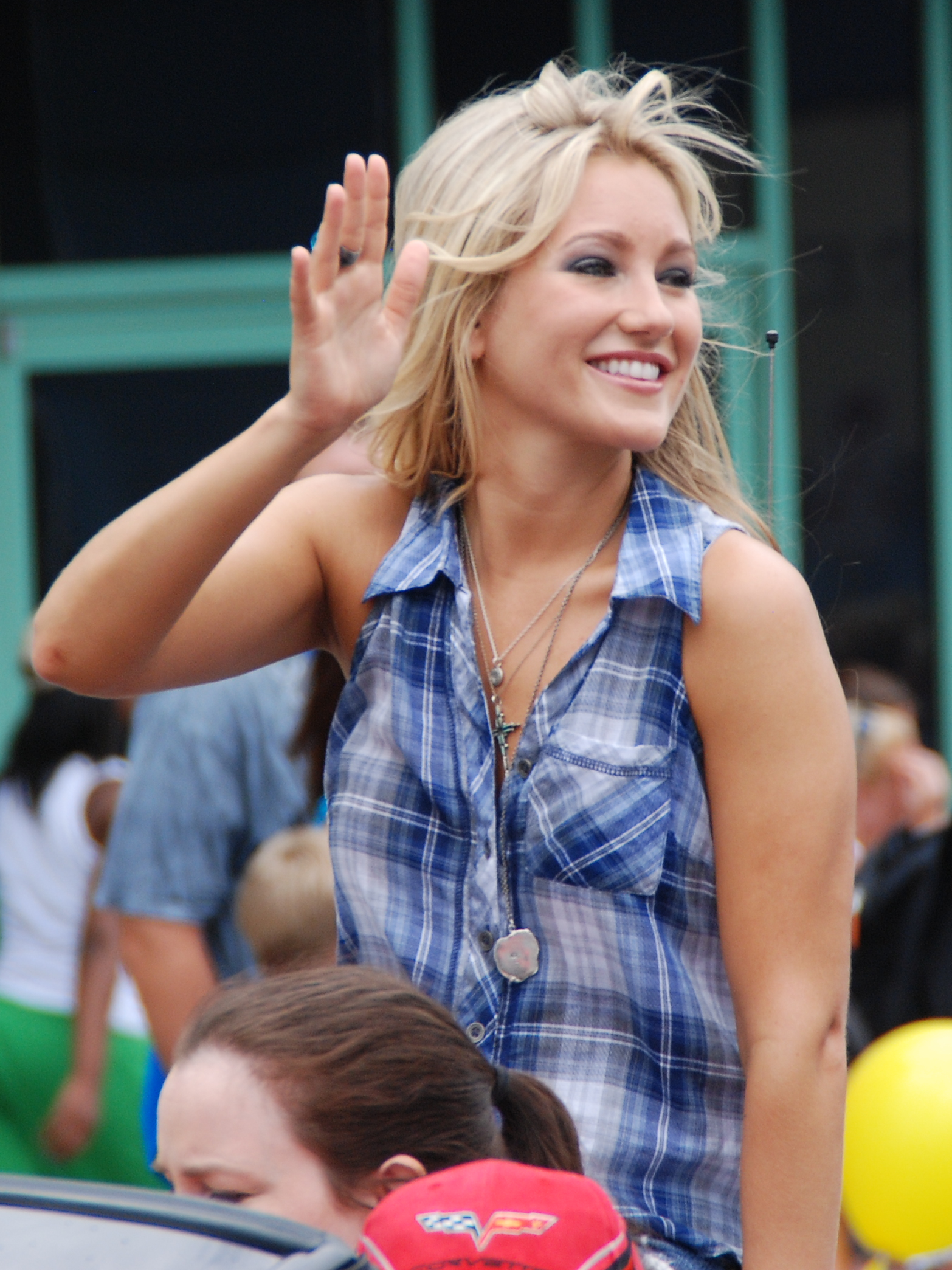
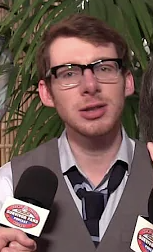
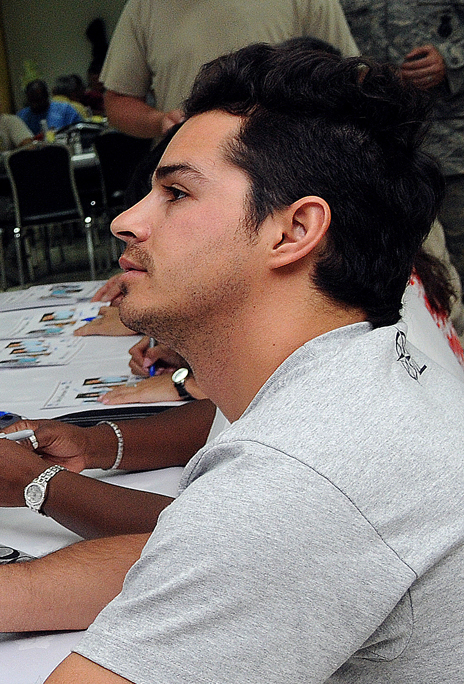
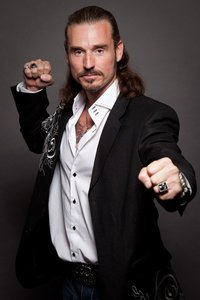
From left to right: Elyse Umemoto, Whitney Duncan, John Cochran, Ozzy Lusth, and Benjamin "Coach" Wade

This season features 16 new Survivor contestants and two returning players: Ozzy Lusth from Cook Islands and Micronesia, and Benjamin "Coach" Wade from Tocantins and Heroes vs. Villains. Shane Powers of Panama was contacted, however he declined and was replaced by Lusth. Notable contestants include Brandon Hantz, nephew of three-time Survivor contestant Russell Hantz; country singer Whitney Duncan, a finalist on the fifth season of Nashville Star; and beauty queen and dancer Elyse Umemoto, who was Miss Washington 2007 and 2nd runner-up at Miss America 2008.

The players were initially split into two tribes of nine, each with one returning player: Savaii and Upolu, named after the two main islands of the independent nation of Samoa. When the tribes were merged into one, they chose to name their new tribe Te Tuna, after a Samoan legend about the origins of the coconut tree.

List of Survivor: South Pacific contestants
Contestant	Age	From	Tribe		Main game (Note: Elimination order is based on when the contestant was voted out at Tribal Council)		Redemption Island	
Contestant	Age	From	Original	Merged	Finish	Day	Finish	Day
Semhar Tadesse	24	Los Angeles, California	Savaii		1st voted out	Day 3	Lost duel 1	Day 6
Christine Shields-Markoski	39	Merrick, New York	Upolu		2nd voted out	Day 5	Lost duel 6	Day 19
Mark "Papa Bear" Caruso	48	Forest Hills, New York	Savaii		3rd voted out	Day 8	Lost duel 2	Day 9
Stacey Powell	44	Grand Prairie, Texas	Upolu		4th voted out	Day 11	Lost duel 3	Day 12
Elyse Umemoto	27	Las Vegas, Nevada	Savaii		5th voted out	Day 14	Lost duel 4	Day 15
Mikayla Wingle	22	Tampa, Florida	Upolu		6th voted out	Day 16	Lost duel 5	Day 17
Oscar "Ozzy" Lusth (Returned to game)			Savaii		7th voted out	Day 18	1st returnee	Day 19
Keith Tollefson	26	Edina, Minnesota	Savaii	Te Tuna	8th voted out	Day 21	Lost duel 7; 2nd jury member	Day 25
Oscar "Ozzy" Lusth (Returned to game)			Savaii	Te Tuna	9th voted out	Day 22	2nd returnee	Day 36
Jim Rice	35	Denver, Colorado	Savaii	Te Tuna	10th voted out	Day 24	Lost duel 7; 1st jury member	Day 25
Dawn Meehan	41	South Jordan, Utah	Savaii	Te Tuna	11th voted out	Day 27	Lost duel 8; 3rd jury member	Day 28
Whitney Duncan	27	Nashville, Tennessee	Savaii	Te Tuna	12th voted out	Day 27	Lost duel 8; 4th jury member	Day 28
John Cochran	24	Washington, D.C.	Savaii	Te Tuna	13th voted out	Day 30	Lost duel 9; 5th jury member	Day 31
Edna Ma	35	Los Angeles, California	Upolu	Te Tuna	14th voted out	Day 32	Lost duel 10; 6th jury member	Day 33
Brandon Hantz	19	Katy, Texas	Upolu	Te Tuna	15th voted out	Day 35	Lost duel 11; 7th jury member	Day 36
Rick Nelson	51	Aurora, Utah	Upolu	Te Tuna	16th voted out 8th jury member	Day 37		
Oscar "Ozzy" Lusth Cook Islands & Micronesia	29	Venice, California	Savaii	Te Tuna	17th voted out 9th jury member	Day 38		
Albert Destrade	26	Plantation, Florida	Upolu	Te Tuna	2nd runner-up	Day 39		
Benjamin "Coach" Wade Tocantins & Heroes vs. Villains	39	Susanville, California	Upolu	Te Tuna	Runner-up	Day 39		
Sophie Clarke	21	Willsboro, New York	Upolu	Te Tuna	Sole Survivor	Day 39		

=== Future appearances ===
Brandon Hantz, John Cochran, and Dawn Meehan returned for Survivor: Caramoan. Jim Rice and Mikayla Wingle were included on the public poll to choose the cast of Survivor: Cambodia, but neither was chosen to compete. Ozzy Lusth played for a fourth time on Survivor: Game Changers. Cochran also made a special appearance in the fifth episode of Game Changers, where he gave advice to a contestant who was exiled. Sophie Clarke returned to compete on Survivor: Winners at War. Lusth and Wade once again competed on Survivor 50: In the Hands of the Fans.

Outside of Survivor, Edna Ma appeared on the fifth season of ABC's Shark Tank to secure funding for her product "BareEASE". Whitney Duncan and Keith Tollefson competed as a team on The Amazing Race 25. Wingle competed with Survivor: Pearl Islands castaway Ryan Opray on the Amazon Prime Video series World's Toughest Race: Eco-Challenge Fiji as part of Team Peak Traverse.

== Season summary ==
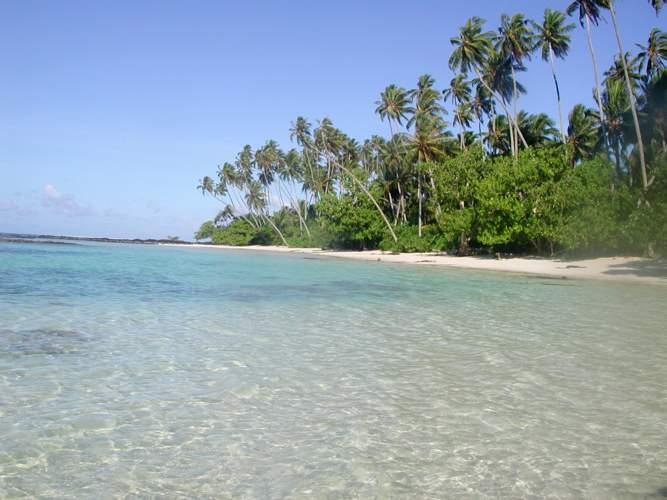
The season filmed in Upolu in Samoa.

Sixteen new castaways, previously divided into two tribes, Savaii and Upolu, were joined by returning contestants, Oscar "Ozzy" Lusth and Benjamin "Coach" Wade, with Ozzy joining Savaii and Coach joining Upolu by random draw. Redemption Island was again in play: voted out players would be sent to Redemption Island and participate in duels, with the winner remaining there until either the next duel or until two specific points where players were brought back into the game.

Both tribes rallied under the leadership of Ozzy and Coach. Ozzy's style was somewhat more aggressive, establishing a rift between the majority of his alliance and others, specifically the weaker Cochran. Coach, having reflected on his past performances on Survivor, had a more open style, which most of the group readily followed, including Brandon, who later revealed himself to be the nephew of former Survivor castaway Russell Hantz, and had feared revealing this lest he draw his tribe's ire. Both Ozzy and Coach found their tribes' respective Hidden Immunity Idols.

The two tribes fared equally at challenges and retained similar numbers, and as they approached the perceived merge, Ozzy offered a plan to volunteer to be voted to go to Redemption Island, where he would likely win the challenge over Christine, a former Upolu member, assuring that the tribes would be equal at six members each when merged. This plan went as expected, and the newly merged tribe named themselves Te Tuna. However, Savaii's former rash behavior to Cochran was seen as an opportunity by the former Upolu members, and they were able to turn Cochran to their side on the first vote after the merge, voting out former Savaii member Keith. The Upolu members and Cochran would continue to dominate at Tribal Council, sending the remaining Savaii members to Redemption Island, starting with Ozzy, who dominated at Redemption Island subsequently.

With no other Savaii members remaining, Cochran was voted out next, followed by Upolu outsider Edna. In the subsequent challenge, Brandon won immunity but offered it to his closest ally Albert, who was the intended target of the vote. Brandon was voted out instead and defeated by Ozzy the next day at the final Redemption duel. Ozzy returned to the game and won the subsequent challenge; at Tribal Council, Sophie broke down into tears but affirmed her commitment to the game, and Rick was voted off. In the final immunity challenge between Coach, Ozzy, Sophie, and Albert, Sophie was narrowly able to defeat Ozzy; she and her former Upolu members voted off Ozzy for the third and final time. Coach, Albert, and Sophie faced the final Tribal Council, where Coach was criticized for manipulating his tribe while simultaneously preaching the importance of honor and Albert was considered to have given his former tribe members false hope. The jury awarded Sophie the title of Sole Survivor over Coach and Albert in a 6–3–0 vote, respectively.

Challenge winners and eliminations by episode
Episode			Redemption Island		Challenge winner(s)		Eliminated	
No.	Title	Original air date	Winner	Eliminated	Reward	Immunity	Tribe	Player
1	"I Need Redemption"	September 14, 2011	None		Ozzy (Note: This player won the hero challenge, earning reward for their entire tribe.) (Savaii)	Upolu	Savaii	Semhar
2	"He Has Demons"	September 21, 2011	None		Savaii		Upolu	Christine
3	"Reap What You Sow"	September 28, 2011	Christine	Semhar	Upolu		Savaii	Papa Bear
4	"Survivalism"	October 5, 2011	Christine	Papa Bear	Savaii		Upolu	Stacey
5	"Taste the Victory"	October 12, 2011	Christine	Stacey	Upolu		Savaii	Elyse
6	"Free Agent"	October 19, 2011	Christine	Elyse	Savaii		Upolu	Mikayla
7	"Trojan Horse"	October 26, 2011	Christine	Mikayla	Upolu		Savaii	Ozzy
8	"Double Agent"	November 2, 2011	Ozzy (Note: Returned to game upon winning the Redemption Island duel.)	Christine	None	Dawn	Te Tuna	Keith
8	"Double Agent"	November 2, 2011	Ozzy	Christine	None	Ozzy	Te Tuna	Keith
9	"Cut Throat"	November 9, 2011	None		None	Jim	Te Tuna	Ozzy
9	"Cut Throat"	November 9, 2011	None		None	Whitney	Te Tuna	Jim
10	"Running the Show"	November 16, 2011	Ozzy	Jim	None	Sophie	Te Tuna	Dawn
10	"Running the Show"	November 16, 2011	Ozzy	Keith	None	Sophie	Te Tuna	Whitney
11	"A Closer Look"	November 23, 2011	Recap Episode					
12	"Cult Like"	November 30, 2011	Ozzy	Dawn	~~Albert~~ (Cochran) (Note: Albert chose to give his reward to Cochran while keeping immunity.) [Coach]	Albert	Te Tuna	Cochran
12	"Cult Like"	November 30, 2011	Ozzy	Whitney	~~Albert~~ (Cochran) [Coach]	Albert	Te Tuna	Cochran
13	"Ticking Time Bomb"	December 7, 2011	Ozzy	Cochran	Ozzy (Note: Ozzy won a reward for finishing the duel first. He was allowed to pick three people to join him on the reward; he chose Albert, Brandon, and Coach.) [Albert, Brandon, Coach]	Coach	Te Tuna	Edna
14	"Then There Were Five"	December 14, 2011	Ozzy	Edna	Brandon [Rick]	~~Brandon~~ (Albert) (Note: Brandon kept his reward, but chose to give his immunity to Albert at Tribal Council.)	Te Tuna	Brandon
15	"Loyalties Will Be Broken"	December 18, 2011	Ozzy	Brandon	None	Ozzy	Te Tuna	Rick
15	"Loyalties Will Be Broken"	December 18, 2011			None	Sophie	Te Tuna	Ozzy
16	"Reunion"	December 18, 2011						

In the case of multiple tribes or castaways who win reward or immunity, they are listed in order of finish, or alphabetically where it was a team effort; where one castaway won and invited others, the invitees are in brackets.

== Episodes ==
No. overall	No. in season	Title	Rating/share (household)	Rating/share (18-49)	Original release date	U.S. viewers (millions)	Weekly rank
336	1	"I Need Redemption"	6.4/10	3.4/10	September 14, 2011	10.74	#9
The sixteen new castaways rowed rafts ashore to the Redemption Island Arena to await the arrival of two mystery players by helicopter. Coach and Ozzy disembarked. To determine which tribes the two returnees would join, each randomly drew a paint-filled egg. Crushing their eggs, Coach discovered his was filled with blue paint, meaning he would join Upolu; likewise, the paint inside Ozzy's egg was red, meaning he would join Savaii. While all of Savaii was openly pleased that Ozzy was part of their tribe, Coach's welcome to Upolu was cold, with only Edna showing him kindness. Amidst the ceremony, John requested that Jeff call him by his last name, Cochran, in the vein of past castaways that Jeff was fond of.: Reward challenge: Coach and Ozzy would represent their tribes by climbing a 12-foot (3.7 m) pole to retrieve a wooden turtle. They would then have to dig themselves under a log. Finally, they would solve a six-level Tower of Hanoi puzzle with the turtle as the top piece to win taro and flint for their tribe.; Jeff explained that Redemption Island was in play and that a reward challenge would begin immediately between Coach and Ozzy representing their tribes. They both struggled with the Tower of Hanoi puzzle, requesting help from their tribes. Savaii's assistance was pivotal and Ozzy took the win. When Upolu arrived at their campsite, Coach tried to charm his tribe and overcome his cold greeting. Meanwhile, Christine went off to look for the hidden immunity idol, which roused suspicion among her teammates. Brandon found himself struggling with a secret, being the nephew of the infamous Russell Hantz -- a fact which would be a daunting challenge for Brandon to hide for long as he had the words "Little Hantz" tattooed on his back and arm. During a nighttime conversation, Coach formed an impromptu alliance with Albert, Brandon, Rick, and Sophie. Over at Savaii, Mark asked to be called "Papa Bear", which the rest of his tribe thought was odd but accepted nonetheless. On day 2, Dawn had a minor emotional breakdown, which concerned Papa Bear and Ozzy.: Immunity challenge: The tribes would race through an obstacle course of zigzagging pathways, through a web of strung up coconuts, and over a 10-foot (3.0 m) wall. One tribe member would then dig up a machete and use it to cut five ropes which would release a bin of coconuts. Three tribe members would then shoot the coconuts through a hoop into a net. When enough coconuts were shot into the net, their combined weight would raise a flag. The first tribe to raise their flag would win.; The first immunity challenge was won by Upolu in a close match. In addition to tribal immunity, Upolu received flint and was told that a clue to the hidden immunity idol was hidden at their campsite. When Savaii returned to camp, Semhar and Jim had an argument about Semhar's effort and Jim's criticism at the immunity challenge. Most of the tribe wanted to vote out Semhar due to her failure at the coconut throwing stage of the challenge, for which she had volunteered. Ozzy, however, having bonded with Semhar, suggested that the tribe consider voting out Cochran for being physically inept. Jim was suspicious about Ozzy's reasons for keeping Semhar in the game. Ozzy told Semhar that she needed to lobby the others in voting out Cochran. Jim told Cochran about Ozzy's suggestion and Cochran became paranoid that he would be voted out. At Tribal Council, the tribe debated if Semhar or Cochran was to remain in the tribe. When the vote came, the tribe decided to vote out Semhar unanimously and she became the first resident of Redemption Island.
337	2	"He Has Demons"	6.3/10	3.2/9	September 21, 2011	10.46	N/A
On Redemption Island, Semhar recited poetry to comfort herself over feeling abandoned by her tribe. At Upolu, Coach, not having forgotten Edna's earlier kindness toward him, allowed her to join his alliance, albeit as a sixth, outlying member. In keeping his relation to Russell Hantz a secret and with guilt eating at him, Brandon revealed his secret to Coach and asked him to keep it to himself. Brandon gave his word that he would stick with Coach and their alliance. Christine found the clue to the whereabouts of the hidden immunity idol, but her persistent efforts to find the idol further alienated her from the rest of the tribe. Brandon continued to project sinister and sordid motivations in Mikayla's simple camp activities and felt very uncomfortable around her, saying that she reminded him of Parvati Shallow. Because of this, Brandon wanted Mikayla voted out as soon as possible. At Savaii, Ozzy used his past Survivor experience and looked for things out of place and discovered the hidden immunity idol. Jim put forth a "3 plus 2" alliance plan of himself, Keith, and Ozzy as a core alliance with Elyse and Whitney as the "plus 2".: Reward/Immunity challenge: Four members from each tribe would unwind ribbons from a maypole to release a set of keys. One of the four would then use the keys to free four other tribemates. Those four tribemates would then push crates around a platform to clear the way for a large crate to pass under a pole. The entire tribe would then carry the large crate to a finish platform. The first tribe to have their large crate onto the finish platform would win pillows, blankets, a hammock, a mat, and immunity.; At the combined reward/immunity challenge, the men of Upolu blew a huge lead going into the crate stage of the challenge, allowing Savaii to come from behind and win the challenge. Back at camp, most of the core Upolu alliance had settled on targeting the outsider of the tribe, Christine, but were also wary about the possibility of her having found a hidden immunity idol -- so Coach suggested to his alliance that they protect themselves by splitting their votes between Christine and her only ally, Stacey. Brandon, however, expressed his desire to vote out Mikayla instead. Coach, trying to maintain control of the alliance, insisted that they stick to the plan of splitting the vote. Still wanting to eliminate Mikayla first, Brandon lied to Coach and told him that Christine and Stacey would vote for Mikayla. At Tribal Council, Coach confronted Christine and Stacey about their votes. Christine and Stacey denied they had ever said they would vote for Mikayla. When they asked who Coach had heard that from, Coach refused to say until Brandon confessed to telling the two women to vote against Mikayla. When the vote came, the alliance of six along with Mikayla followed Coach's plan and split their vote, casting four against Christine and three against Stacey. Having failed to find the idol, Christine was sent to Redemption Island.
338	3	"Reap What You Sow"	6.4/10	3.2/9	September 28, 2011	10.71	#25
Day 6's tree mail announced the first Redemption Island duel. The tribes were instructed to send two members to witness the duel; Upolu sent Coach and Stacey while Savaii sent Ozzy and Elyse.: Redemption Island duel: The castaways would balance a wooden totem on top of a pole which they would have to keep upright by holding at the bottom of the pole. At regular intervals, the player would add an additional section to the bottom of the pole, making the pole longer and harder to balance. The last castaway still holding the totem up would win.; Before the duel started, Semhar recited more poetry to calm herself, but it did not help and she lost to Christine. On day 7 at Upolu, Brandon felt guilty about lying to his tribe during his push to vote out Mikayla. He finally told them the truth about his family, displayed his tattoos and apologized for continuing to lie to them. In private, Brandon and Mikayla discussed why he wanted to vote her out. After Brandon felt threatened by her demeanor, he gathered the rest of the tribe and told them all that he was very upset at Mikayla's approach, that she did not appear to have much of an alliance, and to keep him out of all tribal drama. Coach was concerned that Brandon's outburst would cause friction within the tribe and his alliance. At Savaii, Ozzy decided that he had to trust somebody with the knowledge of his hidden immunity idol discovery and he decided upon telling Keith. Keith then told Whitney in order to gain her trust.: Reward/Immunity challenge: A tribe member would race across a floating bridge carrying a bodyboard attached to a rope. The tribe member would grab a bag containing a banner that would form part of their tribe's flag. They would then ride the bodyboard back to shore as it was winched in by the four members of their tribe. Five bundles would need to be winched to the beach in this manner. Two tribe members would then use grappling hooks from the top of a wall to retrieve the five banners. Finally, the two tribe members would assemble the banners into their tribe's flag. The first tribe to have their flag completed would win chocolate, cookies, coffee, powdered milk, tea, sugar, and immunity.; The tribes were neck-in-neck until the grappling hook stage of the challenge; while Elyse and Whitney struggled with their grappling hook, Coach and Edna blazed far ahead of them and won the challenge for Upolu. Back at Savaii, Cochran and Papa Bear shared their fear that one of them would be going to Redemption Island after Tribal Council and that the other would go at the next Tribal Council. The rest of the tribe decided on voting out Papa Bear, viewing him as their weakest link, but would tell him that they would be voting for Cochran. Ozzy told Cochran about the plan in an attempt to preemptively quell any paranoia from Cochran. When Jim and Ozzy told Papa Bear that Cochran was going home, Papa Bear saw through their lie and he went to search for the hidden immunity idol in a last ditch effort to save himself. Elyse and Jim followed Papa Bear into the woods to watch him look for the idol. Failing to find the idol, Papa Bear decided to create a false idol in order to fool the tribe into thinking he had one. Papa Bear then set his plan in motion, telling Jim that he had found the idol. Cochran correctly surmised that Papa Bear's idol was fake, but Cochran was still concerned that everyone else would fall for Papa Bear's scheme and shift the vote from Papa Bear to Cochran. At Tribal Council, the tribe ultimately voted to call Papa Bear's bluff and he was sent to Redemption Island.
339	4	"Survivalism"	6.3/10	3.1/9	October 5, 2011	10.72	#24
Jim was concerned that Ozzy and Elyse had a tighter bond than people realized and that he could not vote out Ozzy, so he confided with Cochran about a plan to vote out Elyse next. Cochran agreed as that would leave him in the game for at least another three days. At Upolu, Brandon was still feeling tormented by his actions and decided to be a better more honest player. He apologized to Mikayla for his recent outburst in front of the tribe. He then confessed to Edna that she was not actually part of the core alliance of Albert, Brandon, Coach, Rick, and Sophie, but merely a sixth, disposable member, much to Edna's shock and disappointment. Cochran, Jim, Brandon, and Edna went to observe the Redemption Island duel.: Redemption Island duel: The castaways would toss sand bags and attempt to land them on top of ten crates. The first castaway to have one bag on all ten crates would win.; Before the duel started, Brandon apologized to Christine for his rash behavior toward her during Upolu's first Tribal Council. Acknowledging the apology, Christine edged out Papa Bear to win her second duel in a row. Once Brandon and Edna returned to camp, Edna, now on edge about her status in the tribe due to Brandon's earlier confession to her, decided that she had to emphasize the social aspect of her game by being cordial and polite. However, she overplayed her "be nice to everyone" strategy; due to her constant talking and laughing, Edna just ended up irritating Mikayla and Stacey. At Savaii, Cochran approached Dawn about voting out Elyse next.: Reward/Immunity challenge: Three castaways, two men and one woman, from each tribe would stand on perches holding a wooden pole on their shoulders to which weighted bags would be added. Every few minutes, the other four members of the opposing tribe would select someone to bear an additional 20 pounds (9.1 kg) of weight, ergo making it increasingly more difficult for the weight bearers to hold onto their poles; if a weight bearer drops their pole, they would be out of the challenge. The tribe whose weight bearers all drop out of the challenge first loses. The winning tribe is awarded two chicken hens, one rooster, and immunity.; At the combined reward/immunity challenge, Savaii chose Dawn, Jim, and Keith to be the weight bearers while Upolu chose Albert, Brandon, and Stacey. Keith dropped out first after 26 minutes and 180 pounds (82 kg). Albert was out next at the same weight. Jim and Brandon surpassed the Survivor record of 220 pounds (100 kg) held by Rupert Boneham in Survivor: Pearl Islands and James "J.T." Thomas Jr. and Brendan Synnott in Survivor: Tocantins by going to 240 pounds (110 kg), but both dropped their poles shortly after the last 20 pounds (9.1 kg) were added. Finally, Stacey dropped her pole at 140 pounds (64 kg), leaving Dawn as the last weight bearer standing, also with 140 pounds (64 kg) as her final weight held total, giving Savaii the win. Stacey expressed her frustration over being the next target for elimination in her tribe due to her previous ties with Christine, even though she believed she had proven herself to be a strong competitor with her performance in the challenge. Stacey appealed to Coach, implying that she deserved to stay over Edna, whom Stacey viewed as annoying and weak. However, Coach confessed that while he "understood" Stacey and where she was coming from, she was still not safe. Stacey then tried to stir things up by lying to Brandon, telling him that he needed to watch out for Albert, Mikayla, and Sophie, because the three of them might have formed their own secret alliance. Panicked, Brandon relayed the news to Coach, but Coach cut him off and told him that Stacey knew she was getting voted out next and would say anything to save herself. Annoyed about Brandon's actions, Coach and Sophie mulled over the possibility of kicking Brandon out of the core alliance at some point. At Tribal Council, Brandon broke down emotionally for feeling that he had something to prove by being Russell Hantz's relative and that he had to reclaim the family name in a positive manner. The tribe then discussed their issues of trust and loyalty. When the vote came, the core Upolu alliance followed through with their plan and Stacey was sent to Redemption Island, angrily rebuffing her tribe's efforts to hug her as she was leaving due to her knowing the hugs from the alliance were a form of condescension rather than consolation.
340	5	"Taste the Victory"	6.6/11	3.2/9	October 12, 2011	10.69	#23
When Stacey arrived at Redemption Island, she vowed to tell Savaii at the Redemption Island duel that Coach was in control of Upolu. At Upolu, Brandon felt offended by Mikayla's answer during the previous Tribal Council that she disliked him because he was a Hantz. Albert, Mikayla, Dawn, and Whitney went to witness the Redemption Island duel.: Redemption Island duel: The castaways would drop a ball into a metal chute. The ball would travel down a spiraling metal track and exit out of one of two points. The castaway would have to catch the ball and drop the ball back into the chute at the top. Every few minutes, an additional ball would be added to the track until six balls were simultaneously going around the track. A turnstile gate in the middle of the track would rotate, causing the balls to alternate exiting out of the two exits. If a ball exits the track and is not caught, the castaway would be eliminated from the challenge.; Christine and Stacey lambasted Albert and Mikayla, and told Dawn and Whitney that Coach, whom they declined to call Coach, but instead used his real name, Benjamin, was in complete control, Albert was Coach's right-hand man, and the entire tribe were liars. Christine won her third duel in a row. When Albert and Mikayla returned to camp, they told the tribe about Stacey's venting, which upset Coach as he felt it would put a target on his back. Albert found the clue to the hidden immunity idol, but when he couldn't find the Idol itself, he told Coach and Sophie about the clue to enhance their trust in him. Coach found the hidden immunity idol and told his new sub-alliance of three.: Reward/Immunity challenge: Using only their mouths, the castaways would rip pieces of meat off a large pork roast and put it into a basket. The tribe with the most meat in the basket after ten minutes would win vegetables, spices, bread, and the meat that they collected and immunity.; The combined reward/immunity challenge was won by Upolu by a slim 2 ounces (56.7 g), continuing the trend of alternating tribal wins. Back at the Savaii camp, Ozzy wanted to vote out Cochran while Jim, Cochran, and Dawn wanted to blindside Elyse to break up her close alliance with Ozzy. In an effort to get the majority fourth vote, Jim approached Keith about voting out Elyse. Keith talked to Whitney about how to vote out Elyse without breaking their alliance with Ozzy. Whitney thought about letting Jim, Cochran, and Dawn vote for Elyse, but she and Keith would vote for anybody but Cochran. At Tribal Council, Keith and Whitney threw their votes against Dawn, allowing the alliance of three to blindside Elyse, sending her to Redemption Island.
341	6	"Free Agent"	6.7/11	3.3/9	October 19, 2011	11.24	#23
When Savaii returned to their camp, Ozzy felt betrayed by the tribe's decision to go behind his back and vote out Elyse, declaring himself a "free agent" in terms of no alliances with the tribe. Feeling that he wanted to put everything out in the open, he declared that he had the hidden immunity idol. The rest of the tribe felt that Ozzy was being childish about the blindside. Over at Upolu, Brandon found the clue to the hidden immunity idol and shared it with Coach and Albert. Brandon went on the hunt without knowing that Coach already had the idol. Coach and Albert agreed that telling Brandon that they already had the idol would cause him to fly off the handle.: Redemption Island duel: The castaways would play a variation of shuffleboard. The castaways would start the game with four pucks a piece on the board and would slide another puck to knock their opponent's pucks off the board. The last castaway to have a puck on the board would win.; Sophie, Rick, Ozzy, and Keith witnessed Christine continue her domination at the Redemption Island duel with her fourth win in a row. Over at Upolu, Edna continued cozying up with Coach in order to improve her outlier status with the core alliance of five. On day 15, Ozzy realized that his temper tantrum after Tribal Council was a mistake and tried to patch things up with the tribe.: Reward/Immunity challenge: Three castaways from each tribe would assemble a wheelbarrow and then push the wheelbarrow around a series of obstacles. Along the way, they would stop at two stations and collect a load of coconuts. At the end of the obstacle course, the three tribe members would dump out the coconuts into a box. The three other castaways would then disassemble the wheelbarrow and reassemble it into a sling shot. They would use the coconuts as ammunition for the slingshot to knock down six targets. The first tribe to knock all six of their targets down would win a trip to the "sliding rocks", a waterfall where people can slide down the rocks into a pool below, a picnic lunch, and immunity.; At the combined reward/immunity challenge, Savaii struggled during the first half of the challenge, falling way behind Upolu. When Mikayla missed several shots with the slingshot, Coach told her to sit out and let someone else shoot, but she refused and stubbornly kept trying, continuing to miss. Meanwhile, Jim and Keith proved to be adept with their slingshot, allowing Savaii to overcome the deficit and take the win. Coach angrily blamed Upolu's upset loss on Mikayla and privately expressed satisfaction that he wouldn't have to deal with her for much longer, as she was the core alliance's next target. Albert, however, having befriended Mikayla and believing her to be an asset to the tribe, began a campaign to keep Mikayla, arguing that Edna should go instead. Sophie agreed with Albert to vote out Edna. Brandon, however, refused to go along with Albert's plan, arguing that the core alliance had a duty to stay true to their original agreement to vote out Mikayla next. Albert and Sophie then tried to convince Coach that Edna was their weakest link and the tribe still needed Mikayla's strength. However, Coach remained steadfast in his decision to vote out Mikayla, claiming that Edna was much more trustworthy than Mikayla, and he felt that was more important going into the merge. With the alliance split, Rick became the swing vote and Coach and Albert each lobbied hard to win Rick over. At Tribal Council, Brandon once again acted out, this time livid over what he perceived to be a breakdown of loyalty within the core alliance. In the end, Rick sided with Coach, Edna, and Brandon, sending Mikayla to Redemption Island.
342	7	"Trojan Horse"	7.1/11	3.5/10	October 26, 2011	11.79	#17
Upon returning to camp after their heated split vote at Tribal Council, the remaining members of Upolu made amends with each other, promising to stay united going forward. Though soon thereafter, most of the tribe expressed concern that Brandon's recurring blowups at Tribal Council could potentially jeopardize their future in the game. Edna, however, secretly hoped that Brandon's behavior would continue, as it might shift the next target from her to him.: Redemption Island duel: The castaways would dismantle a box and use the pieces as planks to build a bridge. Once they cross the bridge, they would use some of the planks to solve a pattern puzzle. The first castaway to solve their puzzle would win.; Sophie, Albert, Ozzy, and Cochran witnessed the duel between Christine and Mikayla. Despite the verbal support that Mikayla received from Albert and Sophie, Christine won her fifth Redemption Island duel in a row in a closely fought match. With Christine's continued domination at the duels and the possibility that Savaii might lose the next challenge, Ozzy began to consider volunteering to be sent to Redemption Island so that he could defeat Christine ahead of a tribal merge. A win by him would mean that the tribes would go into the merge in equal numbers. He approached Cochran about his plan and also offered to give his hidden immunity idol to someone to hold for him while he was at Redemption Island. At Upolu, Coach tried to inspire his tribe by having them all "find" the hidden immunity idol. Coach, Albert, and Sophie staged a hunt for the idol for the others. While passing the tree mail stand, Coach and Sophie found a package announcing the upcoming challenge, so they took the opportunity to announce they had "two pieces of great news": the upcoming challenge and the "finding" of the hidden immunity idol.: Reward/Immunity challenge: The tribes would split off in pairs of castaways. One pair would act as callers to the two other pairs as they navigate blindfolded and hooked to a rope through an obstacle course to collect four bags of masks. One pair of castaways would then use only their sense of touch with no help from the rest of the tribe to match the masks into pairs. The first pair to properly match all eight masks would win for their tribe a screening of Jack and Jill and immunity.; Both tribes considered the reward/immunity challenge to be crucial, since they had correctly suspected that it was the final tribal challenge of the game and the tribe that won it would secure all of their members going into the merge, and would potentially have a numbers advantage depending on who returned from Redemption Island. Upolu chose Coach and Rick as their callers/rope handlers, while Savaii used Jim and Cochran. The tribes were neck-in-neck through most of the challenge, but on the final heat, Cochran struggled to get Ozzy and Whitney properly hooked into their rope. Savaii fell behind and never recovered, and Upolu ecstatically took the pivotal win. Cochran's entire tribe was extremely upset over his incompetence in the challenge, which concerned Cochran that Ozzy might renege on his plan to volunteer to go to Redemption Island. Sure enough, when Savaii got back to camp, they blamed the loss on Cochran and told him that he could redeem himself at Redemption Island. However, by the next morning, the anger at Cochran had subsided. Ozzy retrieved the hidden immunity idol, presented it to the tribe, and put forth his volunteer plan. Jim and Keith were concerned about Ozzy volunteering to be voted out since if the merge did not happen the next day, the tribe would be weaker with Cochran competing in the next challenge rather than Ozzy. At Tribal Council, Ozzy offered his plan to volunteer with the twist that he would tell Christine that Cochran had found the hidden immunity idol and used it to blindside Ozzy. Before the votes were read, Ozzy handed the idol to Cochran and made Cochran promise to give it back to Ozzy in the event that Ozzy won the right to return to the game. When the votes were read, Savaii's plans were set in motion as Ozzy was sent to Redemption Island.
343	8	"Double Agent"	7.0/11	3.6/10	November 2, 2011	11.95	#18
Redemption Island duel: The two castaways would use rope to tie together sticks in order to make a pole to retrieve three keys. The first castaway to retrieve all three keys, unlock three locks and walk through the doorway would win.; When Ozzy arrived at Redemption Island, he spun his planned tale about being blindsided by Cochran to Christine. Both tribes arrived to witness the Redemption Island duel and Upolu was stunned to see Ozzy in the duel. When asked by Jeff if he was surprised to be here, Ozzy laid it on thick with the resentment towards Cochran on being voted out, but Albert and Coach were suspect about the act. After Jeff announced the rules of the duel, he announced that the winner would return to the game. Ozzy crushed Christine at the duel when he retrieved all his keys and walked through the doorway before Christine was able to retrieve a single key. Jeff told Ozzy that he was back in the game and that the tribes had merged. After the traditional merge feast, Cochran took Coach aside and attempted to infiltrate Upolu's ranks, as per Savaii's plan, but Coach saw right through Cochran's lies and laid out exactly what the former Savaii members were scheming. Assuring Cochran that Upolu wasn't going to fall for Savaii's trap, Coach then gave Cochran a choice: either stay with Savaii and leave the elimination at the next Tribal Council up to chance after an evenly split vote, or truly defect from Savaii and vote with Upolu, guaranteeing Cochran's safety in the dominant alliance. Cochran decided to leave his old tribe and he told Upolu all about Savaii's plans and tribal politics. Cochran kept his word and returned the hidden immunity idol to Ozzy. Cochran and Dawn talked about being an outsider within their own tribe and she considered flipping tribes with Cochran.: Immunity challenge: The castaways would balance on a small perch while holding a coconut between two ropes. At regular intervals, the lengths of the rope would be increased. The last man and last woman balancing their coconuts would win.; At the individual immunity challenge, after other players were eliminated, Dawn beat out Sophie while Ozzy beat out Albert. When the tribe returned to camp, the former Savaii gathered to congratulate themselves on their pre-merge plan working and to vote for Rick. They thought Upolu would vote against Whitney, so Ozzy would hand the hidden immunity idol to Whitney at Tribal Council. Little did they know that Cochran immediately told Sophie about Savaii's plan. Dawn asked Cochran what he was going to do and he told her that he was thinking of flipping tribes. While she had earlier considered joining Cochran, she now wanted to stay loyal to the tribe and warned him to not flip. At Tribal Council, Upolu declared that they saw through Savaii's charade at the Redemption Island duel. Ozzy told them to call their bluff. Before the votes were read, Ozzy played the hidden immunity idol for Whitney. But thanks to Cochran having earlier spilled Savaii's entire plan to Upolu, Whitney received no votes and Savaii's idol was wasted. Instead, the vote was split along tribal lines with six votes apiece against Keith and Rick. Jeff called for a revote with the castaways only being able to vote for Keith or Rick. On the second vote, Cochran flipped to the Upolu alliance, sending Keith to Redemption Island. Immediately after the vote, Cochran confessed his betrayal to his now-former Savaii allies.
344	9	"Cut Throat"	6.5/10	3.2/9	November 9, 2011	10.80	#22
When Te Tuna returned to camp, Ozzy, Jim, and Whitney ripped into Cochran over his betrayal. Cochran retreated to his new Upolu alliance. Coach asked Cochran who he would like voted out next and he responded, "Ozzy" because he was a threat at challenges or Jim on a personal level.: Immunity challenge: The castaways would toss coconuts into a hole in the ground. The first four to successfully land a coconut into the hole would move on to the second round. In the second round, the four castaways would crack open coconuts, take the coconut water into their mouths, and then run through an obstacle course. At the end of the course, the castaways would spit out the coconut water into a tube and then repeat the course until the tube was filled. The first castaway to fill their tube would win.; At the immunity challenge, Dawn, Whitney, Jim, and Sophie made it to the second round. In the second round, Jim beat out Sophie after Sophie gagged on the mouthful of coconut water that would have won the challenge. Back at camp, Jim came up with a plan to stir up Tribal Council by giving the Immunity Necklace to Ozzy and then making a rousing speech to get two of the Upolu tribe to vote against Cochran. When Tribal Council came, Jim and Ozzy made several rousing speeches, but Jim did not hand over the Immunity Necklace because Upolu threatened him before Tribal Council that if he gave his Immunity Necklace to Ozzy, he would be voted out. This sealed Ozzy's fate and he was sent back to Redemption Island, with Dawn and Whitney voting with the Upolu alliance.: Immunity challenge: While balancing barefoot on a beam that narrows in three stages, the castaways would hold a wooden bow with a ball balanced on top. At regular intervals, the castaways would move down the beam towards the narrower part of the beam. The last castaway balancing the ball on the bow and standing on the beam would win.; After Jeff announced the rules for the immunity challenge, Jeff offered the castaways to opt out of the challenge by choosing pastries and iced coffee. The former Upolu tribe, and Cochran, opted out of the challenge in order to feast, leaving the immunity to be decided between Dawn, Jim, and Whitney. Whitney beat out Dawn to win Individual Immunity. Knowing that he was most likely going to be voted out next, Jim approached Albert and Sophie about joining the remaining former Savaii members in blindsiding Edna, but Albert and Sophie weren't budging. Albert came up with an alternative plan to vote out Dawn, seeing her as a bigger threat than Jim; Dawn was endearing herself to the Upolu alliance, and Albert feared that she might find a way to infiltrate their ranks. He discussed the plan with his alliance, but the reception was lukewarm. At Tribal Council, the Upolu alliance stuck with their original plan and Jim was sent to Redemption Island.
345	10	"Running the Show"	7.0/11	3.3/9	November 16, 2011	11.66	#20
On day 25, Cochran tried to cozy up to Coach by joining him in a session of tai chi on the beach. Coach told Cochran that he would do everything he could to keep Cochran in the game longer than seventh place and that he was concerned that Albert might be plotting something.: Redemption Island duel: The castaways would hold two poles on the tops of their hands up against a board over their heads. Any movement in their hands would cause the poles to drop to the ground. The last person who does not drop their poles would win.; At the Redemption Island duel between Jim, Keith, and Ozzy, after Jeff explained the rules of the competition, he revealed that only one person would move on, and the two losers would become the first and second members of the jury. Jim faltered first and became the first member of the jury. Keith dropped out next to become the second jury member. On Redemption Island, Ozzy thought the situation of no stress and abundant food allowed him to recharge and be a bigger physical threat towards the end game. Over at Te Tuna, Cochran thought about trying to regain some of the trust he lost from Dawn and Whitney by helping them last further in the game.: Immunity challenge: The castaways would fill a bowl with rice and balance it on their head while crossing over two teeter-totters. They would then dump the rice into a basket on a third teeter-totter. If a castaway touches the bowl or drops it, they would need to go back to the start. The first castaway to fill their basket with enough rice to cause their teeter-totter to tip and raise a flag would win.; At the immunity challenge, Sophie beat out Dawn and Brandon while the rest struggled. After Jeff awarded the Immunity Necklace, he said that there would be a twist at Tribal Council. Back at camp, Dawn and Whitney talked to Albert and Cochran about blindsiding one of the Upolu alliance. Albert considered blindsiding Edna which would curry favor from the former Savaii jury members. Albert told Cochran that he would be voted out seventh and his plan to blindside Edna. Albert also told Sophie about his plan as she would be the swing vote. Coach, however, became suspicious of Albert and decided that he needed to lay down the law, threatening that anybody who betrayed the Upolu alliance "would be dead". At Tribal Council, the Upolu alliance stayed intact and Dawn was sent to Redemption Island.: Immunity challenge: The castaways would be asked a series of survival related questions. If a castaway were to answer the question incorrectly, they would be out of the challenge. The last castaway to answer a question correctly would win.; After Dawn left, Jeff announced that the twist would be an immediate immunity challenge followed by a second round of voting. The Upolu alliance barely avoided having to turn on one of their own when Sophie prevailed over Whitney in the final question. The Upolu alliance then proceeded to pick off the final Savaii outsider, sending Whitney to Redemption Island.
346	11	"A Closer Look"	4.6/8	1.9/6	November 23, 2011	7.98	N/A
Recap episode of the first 27 days including bonus scenes.
347	12	"Cult Like"	6.6/10	3.1/9	November 30, 2011	11.05	#9
Fearing that the original Upolu tribe would turn on him now that all the other former Savaii members were gone, Cochran appealed to the core Upolu alliance of Albert, Brandon, Coach, Rick, and Sophie. Cochran requested that they keep him in the game for at least one more Tribal Council as he felt that they owed him for flipping over to their side, giving them the pivotal vote that they needed to defeat Savaii. To further strengthen the guilt trip that he was trying to lay on the core Upolu alliance, Cochran also told a lie to them that his birthday was near and he wanted to celebrate it in the game. After Cochran left, the Upolu men mulled over the possibility of sparing Cochran from the next vote, getting rid of Edna instead. Sophie shot the idea down, however, arguing that Edna had seniority in the Upolu alliance over Cochran, and that the core members were just as indebted to Edna for her unwavering loyalty as they were to Cochran for flipping.: Redemption Island duel: The castaways would balance ceramic dishes on the end of a balancing arm. As the challenge progresses, Jeff would call out different dishwares that the castaways would stack on the far end of the balance. Should any part of a castaways's stack fall, that castaway would be out of the challenge. The last castaway in the challenge would win.; At the Redemption Island duel, Ozzy beat out Dawn and Whitney, who became the third and fourth members of the jury. On day 29, the tribe became frustrated with Albert's laziness around camp. Edna asked Coach for advice on how to make it further than sixth place ahead of Cochran. Coach found himself second-guessing his original plans, as he felt that he could trust Cochran and Edna the most.: Reward/Immunity challenge: The castaways would replay previous challenges. In the first stage, the castaways would toss sand bags and attempt to land them on top of three crates. The three castaways to have one bag on all three crates would move on. In the final stage, the castaways would use the coconuts as ammunition for the slingshot to knock down three targets. The first castaway to knock all three of their targets down would win a spa afternoon with a shower and a massage and immunity.; At the reward/immunity challenge, Albert, Rick, and Sophie moved on to the final round. In the final round, Albert beat out Rick. After the challenge was over, Jeff told Albert that he could choose somebody to join him in the reward and he picked Coach. Albert then asked if he could choose another, but when Jeff told him that he could not, Albert asked if he could give up his reward. Jeff allowed that and Albert, believing Cochran's earlier birthday lie, gave up his reward to Cochran as a gift. During the massage, Coach told Cochran that he would fight to keep Cochran in the game. After returning from the spa trip, Cochran tried to convince Albert to vote out Rick and Albert agreed if Coach and Edna would join them. Cochran then told Edna about his and Albert's tentative plans and she excitedly agreed to it, seeing it as a much-needed opportunity to further herself in the game. When Cochran told Coach about the plan, Coach was unsure of whether to stay loyal to his original alliance or create a new one with Albert, Cochran, and Edna. At Tribal Council, Cochran again pushed his feeling that the Upolu alliance owed him a debt. Edna voiced her sadness in being "a junior member" of the Upolu alliance. When Brandon openly declared that he would vote out Cochran and then Edna next, as per the core Upolu alliance's original plans, Brandon's lack of strategic play was discussed. When the vote came, Albert and Coach decided to stick with their original alliance and voted against Cochran, sending him to Redemption Island.
348	13	"Ticking Time Bomb"	6.8/11	3.3/9	December 7, 2011	11.59	#16
When Cochran arrived at Redemption Island, he felt insulted and used by the Upolu alliance. Ozzy asked for Cochran's vote at the Final Tribal Council, but Cochran would not commit to that as he felt insulted by the implication that he would lose at the Redemption Island duel. On day 31, Edna expressed her anger and frustration over being the core Upolu alliance's next target, being especially livid that Brandon, whom she greatly disliked, was playing a role in dictating her fate in the game. In the middle of Edna making a tearful plea to Coach to spare her from the next vote, Brandon interrupted the conversation when he burst into camp, yelling that the tribe had received tree mail with a Sprint HTC Evo 3D. The phone contained video messages from the castaways' loved ones: Coach's brother Pete, Sophie's father Thurston, Edna's sister Debbie, Brandon's father Shawn, Albert's mom Annie and Rick's wife Katy.: Redemption Island duel: The castaways would toss a grappling hook to retrieve three bags with a ball inside. They would then use one of those balls to finish a labyrinth game. The first to finish would win.; At the Redemption Island duel, Jeff took the phone back and announced that there was a twist to the duel, but that he would get to it later. While Cochran struggled during the grappling hook stage, he caught up during the labyrinth game and was just barely edged out by Ozzy. After Cochran departed the Redemption Island Arena, Jeff brought out all of the castaways' loved ones. Jeff then tasked Ozzy with choosing three people to spend some time with their loved ones. Ozzy picked Albert and his mother, Coach and his brother, and Brandon and his father. After Edna, Rick, and Sophie left the Arena, Jeff handed the phone back to Ozzy and told the seven that they would be spending their time at Redemption Island. During the visit, Coach took the opportunity to promise Ozzy that "as a Christian man" that they would go to the final three should he return to the game. Brandon's father tried to convince Brandon that he needed to play to win, not to always play with honor. Brandon's father then told Coach that Brandon would follow any orders Coach would give as long as he took Brandon to the final three, but Coach was annoyed at the attempted manipulation.: Immunity challenge: The castaways would play on a grid of hexagons. They would start by standing on a hexagon and step to an adjoining hexagon. As they move, they would flip over the hexagon they were just on, indicating that the hexagon was no longer in play. Each castaway would continue to move until they could no longer make a move. The last castaway to be able to make a move would win.; During the immunity challenge, after Brandon made his final move, he announced that he was making moves to prevent "a particular person" from winning immunity. Edna, irked by his statements, cut him off and told him to go ahead and just name her. In the end, Coach beat out Edna by a wide margin to take Individual Immunity. When the tribe returned to camp, Sophie and Rick expressed their disapproval of Brandon's actions toward Edna during the challenge. Brandon attempted to apologize to Edna, but Edna did not accept it as she thought it was insincere. Edna appealed to Albert, Coach, and Sophie to follow the tribe's mantra of playing with "Honor. Loyalty. Integrity." and to vote Brandon out for going against those values. Edna then took Coach aside, asking him to either pass the Immunity Necklace to her or give her the hidden immunity idol, but Coach refused, saying that he would potentially ruin his own game if he did. Not giving up, Edna went back to Albert and Sophie, proposing that the three of them and Coach make a final four pact. Believing that Edna would be an easy person to beat in the finals, Albert took her plan into consideration. At Tribal Council, Edna lambasted Brandon for his erratic behavior and his rudeness toward her. Edna then argued to the rest of the Upolu alliance that if they truly believed in their mantra, they would keep her and vote out Brandon. Despite all her efforts, however, the core alliance of five stuck together and sent Edna to Redemption Island.
349	14	"Then There Were Five"	6.5/11	3.1/9	December 14, 2011	10.87	#16
Determining that Sophie was becoming too dangerous to keep in the game, Albert decided to blindside Sophie at the next Tribal Council. Albert figured that Rick was the least dangerous and it would be to his advantage to go with him and Coach to the final Tribal Council.: Redemption Island duel: The castaways would solve a slide puzzle to obtain a hatchet. They would then use the hatchet to cut a rope which would drop a bag of four cubes with colored sides. The castaways would have to stack the cubes such that there would be no repeating colors on each side. The first castaway to properly stack the cubes would win.; At the Redemption Island duel, even though Edna received verbal assistance from the remaining castaways, Ozzy was able to continue his win streak at the duels. When Te Tuna returned to camp, Albert talked to Brandon about blindsiding Sophie. Meanwhile, Sophie told Coach and Rick that they had to send Brandon to Redemption Island as Brandon and Ozzy were the most dangerous players in the game. Albert approached Coach about voting against Sophie, but Coach figured that Albert was running scared. When Brandon interrupted Albert and Coach's conversation, Coach thought Brandon was bullying the two of them and became angry at Brandon. Coach felt that Brandon was acting like his uncle, Russell, and that he had to be voted off next. After Coach apologized for bringing up Russell, Brandon asked for reassurance that everything was okay.: Reward/Immunity challenge: The castaways would use a rope to climb a wall to collect five bags of puzzle pieces. Once all five bags were collected, the 15 puzzle pieces would have to be sorted into matching pairs. Three of the pieces would be unmatchable. These three pieces would reveal a numeric code that would be used to unlock a combination lock on a box at the top of the wall. The first castaway to unlock their box would win pizza and soft drinks to be delivered to camp and immunity.; At the immunity challenge, Brandon beat the tribe to win Individual Immunity. After putting the immunity necklace around Brandon's neck, Jeff handed Brandon a pizza menu and told him to select one person to join him. Brandon, declaring that his selection was from the heart and not strategic, selected Rick. Brandon's win scrambled Coach and Sophie's plan to vote out Brandon so they switched their target to Albert. While Brandon and Rick were enjoying their reward, Sophie told them that she was voting for Albert. Rick told Sophie and Brandon that Albert told Rick that they were going to the final three together. This led to a four-way argument between Albert, Brandon, Rick, and Sophie over who made what promises to whom and who was lying. Albert went into damage control with Brandon. Brandon felt Albert did not intend to deceive him, that he deserved forgiveness, and that God was telling him to keep Albert in the game. Brandon went as far as offering Albert his Individual Immunity at Tribal Council figuring that neither Albert or Coach would vote against him and he would be safe. When Brandon told Coach about his plan, Coach sought his own divine wisdom about whom he should vote against. At the outset of Tribal Council, Brandon declared that he wanted to give up his Individual Immunity. A stunned Jeff and jury watched Brandon hand over the necklace to Albert. Brandon explained his actions by saying that he was staying true to the commitments he had made and he would give up his own place in the game to keep those commitments. Rick revealed that Coach had the hidden immunity idol. When asked by Jeff if he would give the Individual Immunity back to Brandon if he felt Brandon was in danger, Albert said that he did not feel Brandon was in danger and would not give the necklace back. Coach said he had received word from God about whom to vote for and was at peace with the decision. When the vote came, Brandon was indeed in danger as Coach cast the deciding vote against him and he was sent to Redemption Island.
350	15	"Loyalties Will Be Broken"	7.3/11	4.0/10	December 18, 2011	13.07	#7
When Te Tuna returned to camp, Coach ripped into Albert for what he perceived as jury politicking by Albert at Tribal Council.: Redemption Island duel: The castaways would hang on top of a pole as long as they can. The last castaway left hanging without touching the ground would win.; In the final Redemption Island duel, after 40 minutes, the two castaways began to struggle to hang on, with Brandon finally sliding down to the bottom of the pole. With his sixth straight win, Ozzy re-entered the game. When the five returned to camp, Coach took Ozzy aside to tell him that he wanted to take him to the final three and would be willing to give Ozzy the hidden immunity idol if necessary. However, Ozzy was suspicious if Coach would really go through with the deal. Coach was unsure of whom to go with as all of the other castaways had told him that they wanted to go to the final three with them.: Immunity challenge: With one hand, the castaways would pull on a rope that would steady a balancing board. With the other hand, the castaways would build a tower out of wood blocks to a certain height on one end of the balancing board. The first castaway to build their tower high enough would win.; At the immunity challenge, during the middle of the challenge when Sophie was ahead of Ozzy, but had a partial collapse of her tower, she ordered Albert to drop his own efforts in order to help her pick up her dropped blocks. However, Jeff cut off the order by stating that the castaways could not receive any help from other castaways. Sophie never recovered, allowing Ozzy to beat out Coach to win Individual Immunity. When the tribe returned to camp, Coach wanted to vote out Rick as he thought Rick would be a threat for jury votes. Ozzy suggested to Albert to vote out Sophie. Rick also suggested to Coach that they vote for Sophie. At Tribal Council, Coach wore the hidden immunity idol around his neck, leaving the choices of votes to Albert, Rick, and Sophie. The three made their case to stay in the tribe in order to beat out Ozzy. Ozzy told everybody that Coach promised to take him to the final three. Ozzy and Sophie argued what they perceived as personal character attacks against each other. Sophie broke down and cried over the stress of the attacks against her character. After the votes were cast, Coach did not play the hidden immunity idol, and Rick was sent to the jury.: Immunity challenge: The castaways would race through various obstacles to retrieve five bags of puzzle pieces. The first castaway to retrieve all five bags and solve the puzzle would win.; On day 38, Coach told Ozzy that he was upset that Ozzy let out his plan to go to the final three together as it was supposed to be a secret between the two of them. Coach thought he was being disrespected by Ozzy. Ozzy told Coach that his actions at Tribal Council were due to being burned earlier in the game by people he trusted and wasn't sure he could trust Coach. At the immunity challenge, Ozzy retrieved all of his puzzle pieces first, but struggled in getting the puzzle started. Once Sophie had the first piece of the puzzle locked in, she quickly caught up and passed Ozzy to win the final immunity challenge. With the loss, Ozzy knew that he was likely to be going home, but he made a pitch to Coach to force a tie at Tribal Council by appealing to Coach's desire to take warriors to the end. At Tribal Council, Coach was torn between staying loyal to his original alliance or allowing Ozzy to take on Albert in a fire starting challenge. In the end, Coach voted against Ozzy and he became the final member of the jury. Albert, Coach, and Sophie enjoyed the traditional day 39 breakfast. At the final Tribal Council, the jury ripped into the final three for actions or questioned their strategies in the game. Albert was criticized for sucking up to the jurors while they were still in the game, giving them false hope of improving their positions in an attempt to win their votes. Sophie was accused of being condescending and pretentious. Coach was blasted for going against his "honor and integrity" mantra, manipulating people's religion to his advantage, and hiding behind Christianity, while never owning up to his actions.
351	16	"Reunion"	5.8/11	3.0/8	December 18, 2011	9.92	#20
Months later, it was revealed that the jury had cast the majority vote (six) for Sophie, crowning her as the Sole Survivor. Coach was the runner-up with three votes, with Albert in a distant third, receiving no votes. The castaways return to discuss the season with host, Jeff Probst. Notable members of the audience were Joey King, who asked Ozzy a question, and Brandon's uncle and former contestant Russell Hantz, who commented on Brandon's game.

== Voting history ==
	Original tribes							Merged tribe										
Episode	1	2	3	4	5	6	7	8		9		10		12	13	14	15	
Day	3	5	8	11	14	16	18	21		22	24	27		30	32	35	37	38
Tribe	Savaii	Upolu	Savaii	Upolu	Savaii	Upolu	Savaii	Te Tuna		Te Tuna	Te Tuna	Te Tuna		Te Tuna	Te Tuna	Te Tuna	Te Tuna	Te Tuna
Eliminated	Semhar	Christine	Papa Bear	Stacey	Elyse	Mikayla	Ozzy	Tie (Note: The first Tribal Council vote resulted in a tie. Per the rules, a second vote was held where the castaways involved in the tie would not vote and the remaining castaways could only vote for those who tied.)	Keith	Ozzy	Jim	Dawn	Whitney	Cochran	Edna	Brandon	Rick	Ozzy
Votes	8–1	4–3–1–1	6–1–1	7–1	3–2–2	4–3	5–1	6–6	6–4	9–2	7–3	7–2	7–1	5–2	5–1	3–2	3–2	3–1
Voter	Vote																	
Sophie		Stacey		Stacey		Edna		Keith	Keith	Ozzy	Jim	Dawn	Whitney	Cochran	Edna	Brandon	Rick	Ozzy
Coach		Christine		Stacey		Mikayla		Keith	Keith	Ozzy	Jim	Dawn	Whitney	Cochran	Edna	Brandon	Rick	Ozzy
Albert		Christine		Stacey		Edna		Keith	Keith	Ozzy	Jim	Dawn	Whitney	Cochran	Edna	Sophie	Rick	Ozzy
Ozzy	Semhar		Papa Bear		Cochran		Cochran	Rick	Rick	Cochran							Sophie	Albert
Rick		Stacey		Stacey		Mikayla		Keith	None (Note: This player was not eligible to vote in the second round of voting.)	Ozzy	Jim	Dawn	Whitney	Cochran	Edna	Brandon	Sophie	
Brandon		Christine		Stacey		Mikayla		Keith	Keith	Ozzy	Jim	Dawn	Whitney	Cochran	Edna	Sophie		
Edna		Stacey		Stacey		Mikayla		Keith	Keith	Ozzy	Jim	Dawn	Whitney	Rick	Brandon			
Cochran	Semhar		Papa Bear		Elyse		Ozzy	Rick	Keith	Ozzy	Jim	Dawn	Whitney	Rick				
Whitney	Semhar		Papa Bear		Dawn		Ozzy	Rick	Rick	Ozzy	Edna	Edna	Cochran					
Dawn	Semhar		Papa Bear		Elyse		Ozzy	Rick	Rick	Ozzy	Edna	Edna						
Jim	Semhar		Cochran		Elyse		Ozzy	Rick	Rick	Cochran	Edna							
Keith	Semhar		Papa Bear		Dawn		Ozzy	Rick	None									
Mikayla		Christine		Stacey		Edna												
Elyse	Semhar		Papa Bear		Cochran													
Stacey		Sophie		Edna														
Papa Bear	Semhar		Jim															
Christine		Edna																
Semhar	Cochran																	

Jury vote
Episode	16		
Day	39		
Finalist	Sophie	Coach	Albert
Votes	6–3–0		
Juror	Vote		
Ozzy	Yes		
Rick		Yes	
Brandon	Yes		
Edna		Yes	
Cochran		Yes	
Whitney	Yes		
Dawn	Yes		
Keith	Yes		
Jim	Yes		

== Production ==
=== Casting ===
Applications were due on January 11, 2011, approximately 800 applicants visited in various states, from there 16 contestants were chosen as participants.

=== Filming ===
Samoa was not initially selected as a location for this season, as the show had already filmed two seasons (Samoa and Heroes vs. Villains) in the area. The production team withdrew from their original locale, Tonga, due to economic problems. The season was filmed in the vicinity of Upolu and it served as the location for the next season and this was the third season to be filmed in the country, tied with Panama. Redemption Island, first introduced in the prior season, returned for this season.

== Reception ==
While not to the extent of its predecessor, Survivor: South Pacific was generally panned by the time it ended, with the primary criticism being the return of the Redemption Island twist. Dalton Ross of Entertainment Weekly criticized the season's "same twist of two returning players, Redemption Island, the predictable vote-offs, and no real water challenges," but reserved some praise for several of the cast members, including Cochran, Brandon, and winner Sophie. Ross ultimately ranked the season 21st out of 40 (as of May 2020). In 2014, Joe Reid of The Wire ranked it as the 5th-worst season, criticizing both of the returning players as continuing "their already tedious tendencies towards self-aggrandizement and shoddy strategy." In 2020, it was ranked as the 5th-worst season by Survivor fan site "The Purple Rock Podcast", saying that "there were so many unlikable people that you almost forget about the enjoyable ones." They also criticized the two returning players as mostly "terrible choices, and the Redemption Island gimmick was every bit as much of a failure here as it was the first time it was used." Another prominent fan site, "Survivor Oz", ranked it as the 6th-worst season in its first annual poll ranking all seasons of the series in 2012, and thus originally considered it to be the best post-Heroes vs. Villains season at the time; however, in both 2013 and 2014, South Pacific dropped on the list and was consistently ranked as the second-worst season, only ahead of its predecessor, Survivor: Redemption Island. In 2015, a poll by Rob Has a Podcast ranked South Pacific as the 6th-worst season with Rob Cesternino ranking this season 18th out of 30 seasons. This was updated in 2021 during Cesternino's podcast, Survivor All-Time Top 40 Rankings, ranking 29th. In 2020, Inside Survivor ranked this season 30th out of 40 saying that the season's "dull endgame ultimately prevents it from being a great season of Survivor. Still, its memorable characters help elevate it above the other 'Dark Age' seasons that came before and after it." In 2024, Nick Caruso of TVLine ranked this season 27th out of 47.
