= John Cochran (Survivor contestant) =

American reality television personality and television writer (born 1987)

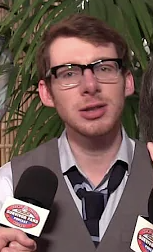
- Cochran in 2013
- Born: John Martin Cochran; January 17, 1987 (age 39); Washington, D.C., U.S.
- Education: Columbia University (BA); Harvard Law School (JD)
- Known for: Survivor: South Pacific; Survivor: Caramoan (winner)
- Television: The Millers (writer); Kevin Can Wait (writer); Star Trek: Lower Decks (writer)

John Martin Cochran (born January 17, 1987), also known by just his surname Cochran, is an American television writer, and former reality television personality. He first appeared on the 23rd season of Survivor, Survivor: South Pacific, and came in eighth place. He returned for the 26th season, Survivor: Caramoan, and ultimately won the title of Sole Survivor and the $1 million prize. He later went on to become a writer for various CBS sitcoms, including The Millers, Kevin Can Wait, and more recently Star Trek: Lower Decks.

== Early life and education ==
Cochran was born in Washington, D.C., to a Jewish mother and a non-Jewish father. He was raised in Oakton, Virginia, and attended Columbia University and Harvard Law School. Even at a young age, Cochran was already a fan of Survivor, following the show since the very first season, even writing a law school paper comparing the jury system of Survivor to the American jury system. During high school, he handed out Survivor newsletters, wore a Survivor-style buff on his arm when the show was airing, and chose his senior year quote as "The tribe has spoken."

== Survivor ==
=== South Pacific ===
Cochran was originally placed on the Savaii tribe and ended up receiving at least one vote in every Tribal Council that Savaii attended, with one vote in their first, second, and fourth Tribal Councils, and two votes in their third Tribal Council. In the last episode before the merge, returning player Ozzy Lusth, in an effort to end the winning streak of Christine Shields-Markoski on Redemption Island, asked his tribe to vote him out, saying that he would tell Shields-Markoski that his elimination was caused by Cochran using a Hidden Immunity Idol. Lusth subsequently gave Cochran the Immunity Idol he had found, making him promise to return it when he came back to the game.

When the merge finally came, Cochran returned the Idol and then pretended to be the outsider of his former tribe when speaking to the other returning player, Benjamin "Coach" Wade. However, Wade quickly realized Cochran's intentions and instead decided to persuade Cochran into voting with the former Upolu members, promising him that he would outlast all of his former tribemates. When the vote that night came down to a split vote and the contestants had to vote again, it was Cochran who switched his vote and sent home former tribemate Keith Tollefson. He was immediately criticized by all of his former tribemates, but the former Upolu members, including Brandon Hantz, came to his defense.

Soon afterward, all other former Savaii members were voted out in succession, with Lusth, Jim Rice, Dawn Meehan, and Whitney Duncan all being sent home. However, once Cochran was the last Savaii member left, the former Upolu members turned on him and voted him out by a vote of 5–2, with only Cochran himself and former Upolu member Edna Ma voting for Rick Nelson instead. After losing the Redemption Island duel to Lusth, Cochran came in eighth place, having lasted for 31 days; he became the fifth member of the nine-member jury. In the final Tribal Council, Cochran voted for Wade to win, along with Nelson and Ma. These three votes made Wade the runner-up to Sophie Clarke, who received the other six votes.

=== Caramoan ===
Cochran returned for the 26th season, the second season to be subtitled "Fans vs. Favorites," and was placed on the "Favorites" tribe, Bikal. He was joined by fellow South Pacific contestants Brandon Hantz and Dawn Meehan. Cochran once again aligned with a majority of his tribemates, under the alliance "Stealth R Us," named by the unofficial tribe leader Phillip Sheppard. Even after the tribal swap in Episode Six, Cochran remained on the Bikal tribe, along with Sheppard, Meehan, fellow returning player Corinne Kaplan, and newcomers Julia Landauer, Matt Bischoff, and Michael Snow. The new Bikal tribe focused on eliminating the new players on the tribe, successfully voting out Bischoff and Landauer before the merge. However, when Sheppard was eliminated due to a blindside by Malcolm Freberg, Reynold Toepfer, and Eddie Fox, Cochran became the default leader due to being viewed as Sheppard's right-hand man.

Over the course of the season, Cochran won three individual immunity challenges, in Episodes 8, 11, and 14. He was the only contestant in the season to win more than one individual immunity challenge. He made a major move to plot the blindside of potential threat Brenda Lowe at the Final Six. Lowe had been plotting to blindside Cochran at either Final Five or Final Four. After a win at the Final Four immunity challenge to secure his place in the finals, and with Sherri Biethman the easiest finals opponent, he debated bringing Fox or his closest ally Meehan. He decided on Dawn and Sherri, realizing that Eddie, despite floating through the game, had numerous friends on the jury and was the bigger threat. When it came to jury presentations, Cochran received nearly unanimous praise for the way he played the game strategically without letting emotions interfere, and for always sticking to his promises.

Biethman was considered to have ridden coattails to the end, and Meehan was criticized for her emotional instability. Ultimately, Cochran won a unanimous 8–0–0 vote. Cochran became the third winner in Survivor history to win a unanimous vote, after Earl Cole in Survivor: Fiji and J. T. Thomas in Survivor: Tocantins. He was also the second winner to win a unanimous vote while also never receiving a single vote against him in any Tribal Council, after Thomas.

=== Cameos ===
Cochran showed up on the reunion show for Survivor: Blood vs. Water, the show's 27th season. Jeff Probst asked Cochran about new developments in his life, and presented a comedy sketch starring Cochran and actor Will Arnett. Cochran later appeared as a guest on the fifth episode of Survivor's 34th season, Survivor: Game Changers, where he visited exiled castaway Debbie Wanner to give her advice.

== Popularity ==
After Caramoan ended, Cochran was inducted into Xfinity's Survivor "Hall of Fame," as part of the class of 2013, alongside Kim Spradlin and Jonny Fairplay. Two years later, in the official issue of CBS Watch magazine commemorating the 15th anniversary of Survivor, Cochran was voted as the seventh greatest player of all time. Additionally, in a 2015 interview shortly before the premiere of the 30th season, host Jeff Probst declared Cochran to be his favorite season winner ever. In 2017, Entertainment Weekly had fans rank the first 34 winners of the series and Cochran placed 11th.

== Television writing ==
Shortly after his second Survivor appearance, Probst put Cochran into contact with Greg Garcia, creator of and writer for The Millers. Garcia offered Cochran a job as a writer for the show. Cochran accepted the job, and after graduating from Harvard Law, moved to Los Angeles to begin working on the show. Although the series was canceled shortly thereafter, Cochran landed another writing gig on Kevin Can Wait a few years later.

Preceded by Denise Stapley	Winner of Survivor; Survivor: Caramoan	Succeeded by Tyson Apostol
