= Murder of Holly Bobo =

Murder of American woman

Holly Bobo
- Born: Holly Lynn Bobo; October 12, 1990; United States
- Disappeared: April 13, 2011 (aged 20); Parsons, Tennessee, U.S.
- Status: Found deceased
- Education: Tennessee Technology Center, Parsons, Tennessee, U.S.
- Parents: Dana Bobo; Karen Bobo
- Relatives: Whitney Duncan (cousin)

Holly Lynn Bobo (October 12, 1990 – c. April 13, 2011) was an American woman who disappeared on April 13, 2011, from her family home in Darden, Tennessee. She was last seen alive by her brother, Clint, shortly before 8 a.m., walking into the woods outside her home with a man wearing camouflage. In September 2014, Bobo's partial remains were found in northern Decatur County, and her death was ruled a homicide via a gunshot to the back of the head.

Six men have been arrested for varying degrees of involvement in the murder. However, only three of the six have been prosecuted. Most of the arrests were made on the basis of a confession by John Dylan Adams, a man with an intellectual disability. He told police he saw Bobo with his brother Zach and a friend, Jason Autry, at his brother's home after her kidnapping. It is unknown what led police to question Dylan about Bobo's disappearance. Dylan, Zach, and Autry were charged with especially aggravated kidnapping, first-degree murder, and rape. Of the other three men arrested, charges against two were dropped, and one committed suicide without any charges being filed against him.

The case has met with several setbacks, such as the death of a suspect, multiple changes to the prosecutorial team, and disputes with the Tennessee Bureau of Investigation (TBI). The prosecution has been heavily criticized for refusing to produce evidence against the defendants, missing multiple discovery deadlines, and making frequent changes to the charges against the defendants with little explanation. The TBI even briefly withdrew its services to the entire district after the prosecutor accused the agency of compromising the case by proceeding "so slowly that the culprits were always one step ahead and that TBI . . . was leaking information and possibly covering up evidence." Defense attorneys reported that they, over a year after the arrests were made, had still not received a bill of particulars detailing the case against their clients and the results of forensic testing done on evidence from the case. They hence filed motions to dismiss charges on the grounds of "silence or stonewalling". The arrests took place in early 2014, but it was not until July 2015 that it was announced that the defendants finally received access to all evidence against them.

On September 22, 2017, a jury found Zach guilty on all charges, including first-degree murder. He was sentenced to life imprisonment plus 50 years on September 23. He maintains his innocence. In January 2018, Zach's brother, Dylan, accepted an Alford plea and was sentenced to 35 years in prison. Autry chose to make a plea bargain with prosecutors, wherein he would testify against Zach in exchange for a significantly reduced sentence. On September 16, 2020, after accepting a deal that reduced his sentence to eight years of time served, Autry was released from Riverbend Maximum Security Institution in Nashville. Autry subsequently recanted his entire testimony against Zach and confirmed that he was then given access to the discovery material, allowing him to synchronize his testimony with the available evidence. In January 2024, Adams filed a petition that his conviction be overturned on the basis of this new evidence.

== Background ==
At the time of her disappearance, Holly Bobo was a 20-year-old nursing student at the University of Tennessee at Martin at The Parsons Center in Parsons. She lived with her parents and brother in Darden. Friends described her as shy and sweet. She was the cousin of country singer Whitney Duncan. In 2017, Duncan released a song called "Better Place" in memory of Bobo.

== Disappearance ==
On the morning of April 13, 2011, Bobo awoke at 4:30 a.m. to study for an exam. At 7:30 a.m., she answered a call from her boyfriend, Drew Scott, who was turkey hunting nearby on his grandmother's property. Bobo's parents had left for work by this point, and her brother, Clint, was still asleep. Twelve minutes later, Bobo made her last cell phone call. After this point, all phone calls and texts were incoming and unanswered.

Shortly after Bobo's final phone call ended, a neighbor heard a scream from the Bobo residence. The neighbor called his mother to tell her about what he heard, and the mother, in turn, called Bobo's mother, Karen, at work. Meanwhile, Clint was awakened by the family dogs barking and saw Holly outside with a man dressed in camouflage: "It appeared to be Holly kneeling down and Drew [Scott]. They looked like they were kneeled down, facing each other in the garage, and they were talking back and forth. Holly sounded very upset and heated. He was doing much of the talking, and she would answer back and things like that. I couldn't make out hardly any of the words. The only words I could make out from here were Holly saying, 'No, why?'" Clint said he believed that the couple were breaking up. At some point, Karen called home and spoke to Clint. She said, "Clint, that's not Drew. Get a gun and shoot him." Clint reportedly replied, "You want me to shoot Drew?", still believing that the man was Holly's boyfriend.

Karen called 9-1-1, but because she was calling from work, she reached a dispatcher for the wrong county. At home, Clint looked outside again and saw the man walking with Holly into nearby woods. At this point, he noted that the man was larger than Drew Scott. Clint tried to call his sister's cell phone as well as Scott's cell phone, but neither call was answered. When Karen called her house again, Clint told her what he witnessed and was instructed to call 9-1-1. Clint fetched a loaded pistol and went outside, where he found bloodstains belonging to Holly in the garage. He dialed 9-1-1. Police arrived at the Bobo residence ten minutes later.

Cell phone pings showed Holly's cell phone moving away from her home tower, heading north. Her cell phone continued north to a wooded area near Interstate 40, where her remains were eventually found. After her cell phone stopped moving for 20-30 minutes, it began traveling south again using a different route. The last cell phone ping came from Holly's phone in the area where both the phone and its SIM card were later found.

== Investigation ==
Clint described the man as being between 5 feet 10 inches (1.78 m) and 6 feet (1.8 m) tall, weighing 180–200 pounds (82–91 kg), and having dark hair sticking out from under his cap that was long enough to cover his neck and touch his collar. Clint said that the man was wearing a hat and camouflage clothing from head to toe and identified the pattern as either Mossy Oak break up or leafy wear. He described the male voice he heard as very deep and low.

Extensive searches of the area were conducted after Bobo's disappearance. Several items belonging to Bobo were found scattered throughout the town, including her lunchbox, a receipt with her name on it, a card from school, her cell phone, and a SIM card, which had been removed from the phone.

Early in the investigation, the Tennessee Bureau of Investigation (TBI) focused heavily on a registered sex offender named Terry Britt, who matched the witness description. His home was wiretapped and searched during the course of the investigation, but he was never charged.

In September 2014, Bobo's partial remains were found by ginseng hunters in a wooded area of northern Decatur County, Tennessee, just off I-40, nearly 20 miles (32 km) from Darden. The owner of the property, Gary Tubbs, said it was not uncommon for people to hunt there without permission. Larry Stone, one of the men who found the remains, said he saw a large bucket in the woods, which he upturned. Beneath the bucket, he found a human skull. He then spotted Bobo's remains spread on the ground behind him. Investigators recovered Bobo's skull and teeth, several ribs, and one shoulder blade. Her skull had a bullet hole in the back of it; the bullet entered the back-right side of her head and traveled to the front-left side, fracturing her left cheekbone when it exited.

== Arrests ==
Six men have been implicated in connection with Bobo's disappearance. The first arrest occurred in March 2014 before the discovery of Bobo's remains. Zach Adams, his brother Dylan Adams, and friend Jason Autry were ultimately charged with especially aggravated kidnapping, first-degree murder, and rape. Another two men, Jeffrey and Mark Pearcy, were arrested on charges of accessory after the fact and tampering with evidence; however, charges against the Pearcy brothers were dropped. Another man, Shayne Austin, committed suicide.

It is unclear what initially led law enforcement to suspect these men, but the investigation began with the arrest of Dylan Adams on unrelated weapons charges. After this arrest, he told police that he witnessed Bobo alive with his brother at Zach's home after her abduction. An affidavit for a search warrant states that Dylan told authorities that on April 13, 2011, he went to Zach's residence to get his truck. Dylan reportedly "observed Holly Lynn Bobo sitting in a green chair in the living room wearing a pink t-shirt, with Jason Wayne Autry standing just a few feet away." He also told police Zach was "wearing camouflage shorts, black cut-off-sleeve t-shirt and a pair of green Crocs". Dylan also said that Zach told him "he had raped Bobo and videotaped it." The alleged videotape has not been found. Dylan later recanted the confession and alleged that he was coerced, but his confession led to the arrests of Zach Adams, Jason Autry, and Shayne Austin. Many details contained in the confession were eventually found to be inconsistent with the known evidence, and the narrative presented later in court was vastly different. In early 2017, it was announced that Jason Autry had agreed to testify against Zach in exchange for leniency.

In 2014, District Attorney Matt Stowe said he and the TBI were still "actively looking" to bring criminal charges against additional people, although he declined to name the parties or the charges.

=== Shayne Austin ===
Shayne Kyle Austin was initially offered immunity in exchange for information regarding the location of Bobo's body. Phone records indicate that Austin was in contact with Adams several times on the day of Bobo's abduction, and police believed that Austin helped dispose of the body. The agreement was withdrawn after Austin was unable or unwilling to lead them to the body. The district attorney released a statement saying that Austin had "not been completely truthful, candid, forthcoming or cooperative as to any and all aspects of [the] investigation". In April 2014, Austin's attorney filed a complaint against the state, asking for an immediate and permanent injunction preventing the state from charging Austin. In February 2015, Austin was found dead from suicide in a hotel room in Bartow, Florida. Austin's attorney blamed the suicide on continual threats of prosecution as well as investigators' "witch hunt" style, saying they relied on rumors instead of evidence. The attorney insisted that Austin had nothing to do with the murder and cooperated fully with police.

=== Jeffrey and Mark Pearcy ===
In July 2014, Jeffrey Pearcy and his brother Mark Pearcy were arrested and charged with accessory after the fact and tampering with evidence. They were arrested on the basis of allegations made by Jeffrey's former roommate, Sandra King. She claimed that in May 2014, Jeffrey showed her part of a video in which Adams assaulted Bobo, who was tied up and crying. King told police that she watched only a small clip and did not see the sexual assault. Police arranged for her to make a recorded call to Jeffrey, in which she told him, "That video of Holly, if it had been you, I would have watched it." She said that he replied, "I know." King alleges that Pearcy's brother Mark shot the video.

Both brothers deny that a video existed, and Jeffrey denies knowing the other men who were arrested for the crime. He claims that he was unable to hear Sandra during the phone conversation and that his ex-wife's name is also Holly. Police have analyzed over 20 phones, but have not found any video. Charges against both men were subsequently dropped, and the narrative described at Zach Adams's trial did not include any mention of involvement by the Pearcy brothers.

== Trial of Zach Adams ==
People vs. Zach Adams
- Court: Tennessee
- Decided: September 22, 2017
- Verdict: Guilty

Case history
- Appealed to: Tennessee Court of Appeals
- Subsequent action: 2022

In September 2017, Zach Adams was the first to go on trial. The prosecution's case was largely circumstantial, as there was no DNA or other forensic evidence tying him to the murder. Jason Autry, the state's key witness, testified to a series of events that was drastically different from those in Dylan Adams' confession. Autry testified that he was not involved in the abduction himself but that he went to Austin's home to buy drugs, where he saw Austin and the Adams brothers disposing of evidence from the crime. Autry said that in the back of his truck, Zach Adams had a body that was wrapped in a multi-colored blanket and that Austin was disposing of evidence in a burn barrel.

Autry claimed that he agreed to help Zach Adams dispose of the body. They drove to a spot along the Tennessee River underneath the Interstate 40 bridge with plans to "gut" the body so that it would not float in the water. After unloading the body from the bed of the truck, they realized that Bobo was still alive, so Adams shot her in the back of the head. Fearing that the noise of the gunshot might have attracted attention, Adams and Autry loaded the body back into the truck, and Adams dropped Autry off. Autry testified that Adams later said that he had dumped the body near a place called Kelly Ridge. (Bobo's remains were found in a different location and it is unclear how the body ended up where it was ultimately found.)

The narrative presented at trial was that Austin and the Adams brothers went to the Bobo residence to teach Clint Bobo to make methamphetamine, an allegation that Bobo denies. Holly Bobo came out of the home "screaming and hollering", and the men then abducted her. The prosecution alleged that Austin was the man whom Clint Bobo had described as walking into the woods with his sister, as he was the only one of the men who was close to the size of the man he had described. The three men were alleged to have raped Holly Bobo in a local barn owned by Austin's grandmother.

Two pieces of paper belonging to Holly Bobo, a receipt and a note card, were found on the road where Austin lived; the receipt was found 75 feet from his driveway.

The prosecution also presented other pieces of circumstantial evidence linking Zach Adams to the murder, including that he drove a white truck. A neighbor of the Bobo family had seen a white truck driving rapidly on the morning of the murder. A number of other witnesses testified that Adams made statements implicating himself in Bobo's disappearance. Adams' then-girlfriend, Rebecca Earp, testified, "He said he would tie me up just like he did Holly Bobo and nobody would ever see me again." Zach Adams also allegedly threatened his brother after his arrest that he would "put him in a hole beside her" if he didn't keep his mouth shut.

A gun, listed as an Arminius model HW5 32-caliber Smith & Wesson long revolver, was introduced into evidence by the prosecution. A local man, Victor Dinsmore, led police to the gun, claiming that Austin and Autry sold him the weapon in exchange for drugs. The gun was reportedly found in a body of water. Forensic tests on the weapon failed to find any DNA or fingerprints, and prosecutors were unable to link the gun to the case with ballistics tests

On September 22, 2017, a jury found Zach Adams guilty on all charges, including first-degree murder, especially-aggravated kidnapping, and aggravated rape. On September 23, 2017, he was sentenced to life in prison without parole and two consecutive terms of 25 years for both the kidnapping and rape convictions.

== John Dylan Adams ==
On January 18, 2018, John Dylan Adams pleaded guilty to charges of facilitation of first-degree murder and especially aggravated kidnapping. He was sentenced to 15 years for facilitation of first-degree murder and 35 years for especially aggravated kidnapping. Those sentences are set to run concurrently, meaning he will serve 35 years without parole. Dylan entered an Alford plea, a type of guilty plea in which the defendant does not admit to the criminal act and maintains his innocence, but concedes that the prosecution's case may result in a guilty verdict.

== Innocence claims ==
Despite confessions from Autry, Austin, and Dylan Adams, all men arrested for the crime have vehemently denied involvement in the disappearance at some point and have accused the state of coercive tactics. Early in the case, Autry claimed that investigators tried to get him to testify falsely against Zach Adams. The family of Dylan Adams, who is mentally disabled, claimed that "[T]hey kept him up all night, would not give him anything to eat or drink and finally he said, 'What do you want me to say?'" According to family members, Dylan has some ability to read but cannot perform other tasks such as telling time, and they believe that Dylan is being manipulated.

At the trial for Zach Adams, it was alleged that the state used unethical investigatory techniques to coerce a confession from his brother. In 2014, Dylan Adams was arrested on federal gun charges that would have ended in a lengthy prison sentence. The prosecutor, who was also handling the Bobo case, arranged a no-jail plea deal on the condition that he go live with a retired police officer, Dennis Benjamin, whom Dylan did not know. Five weeks later, Benjamin called 9-1-1 to report that he had someone in his home who wanted to confess to the murder of Holly Bobo. Despite the fact that this confession led to the arrests, much of what Adams confessed to did not match the evidence.

Dylan Adams' mother claims that there was extensive coercion in his interrogation: "In this statement Dylan is trying to tell his story as to what happened, and you've got this TBI agent saying, 'Don't you mean this? Don't you mean it happened like this?' And, 'No, Dylan, it went down like this.' And you can honestly tell at [that] point that Dylan, I can as his mother, he gave up. He's like, 'OK, if that's what you said, OK.'"

Jeffrey Pearcy also claims that King fabricated statements regarding his involvement to assist her son, who is serving a long prison sentence.

=== Zach Adams defense ===
At Zach Adams' trial, his defense contended that he was "100% innocent." The defense alleged that Autry concocted a story in exchange for a reduced sentence, and that although some of his story seemed to be corroborated, he had access to all of the details through discovery. The defense also pointed to the fact that cell phone pings did not follow the path that Holly Bobo's cell phone took and that none of the men matched the witness description given by Clint Bobo. The Adams brothers and Autry were all too tall and were either too slim or too heavy to be the abductor. Austin was the correct weight and height, but Bobo described a man with dark hair that covered his neck; Austin had short red hair.

Former TBI agent Terry Dicus, who had been the lead investigator on the case, testified for the defense. He told the jury that he ruled the men out early in the case because Austin passed a polygraph, their alibis checked out, and cell phone records put Zach Adams and Holly Bobo several miles apart during the critical timeframe. According to a defense expert, Adams' and Bobo's cell phones were in separate sectors during nearly the entire time frame of the abduction; the cell phones came into the same sector only at about 9:10 a.m., over an hour later. Dicus also noted that for Autry's story to fit with the cell phone pings, the men would have had to drive 106 miles per hour, an unlikely scenario on the winding gravel roads they traveled. The defense also noted that all four men had been ruled out as the originator of a palm print found on Holly's car, while another suspect, Terry Britt, could not be excluded.

Jason Autry later recanted his testimony against Adams, claiming he had repeated his day and "added Holly to it" in an attempt to get out of prison. In January 2024 Adams filed a petition that his conviction be overturned on the basis of this new evidence.

=== Terry Britt ===
Zach Adams' defense attorney, Jennifer Thompson, contended that the initial suspect in the case, Terry Britt, was the real killer, saying that he "has never been cleared by the TBI and in fact it appears the government has more evidence of his guilt than it does of the three defendants charged in the present case."

Britt is a convicted sex offender who has been convicted of multiple rapes. It was argued at trial that Britt fit the physical description and had a history of stalking blonde women. Clint Bobo also identified a voice sample of Britt's voice as being very similar to the voice he had heard that morning.

Dicus testified that Britt had fabricated an alibi. Britt told investigators that his wife stayed home from work that morning to help him install a bathtub. Through the investigation, Dicus discovered that Britt's wife, Janet, had gone to work that morning, but Britt called and made her leave "on the biggest news day" of the county's history. The Britts did produce a handwritten receipt for the bathtub, but the store had no record of the sale. According to Dicus, Britt's wife had been with him on previous occasions when Britt had stalked girls. Britt could not be excluded as the contributor of the handprint. Dicus also testified that after the Bobo abduction, Britt allegedly changed his appearance by cutting his hair.

A U.S. Marshals Service senior inspector testified that at one point, Britt said, "Sounds like you have it all figured out," and said he would "plead to it", but did not clarify specific charges or conditions for a plea deal.

== Criticisms of the prosecution ==
The criminal case against the men charged has been met with strong criticism and conflict between members of the prosecution, complicating the investigation. District Attorney Matt Stowe was elected to office in the summer of 2014 after the arrests and stated that he believes he was elected in part due to skepticism regarding the arrests and questions over whether enough evidence exists against them to obtain a conviction. "[Voters] wanted another set of eyes on this Holly Bobo case; they weren't happy with everything that was coming out of there, and I think that they wanted someone else to take a look and someone else to say, 'We know what's going on.'"

In the fall of 2014, Jason Autry's attorney, John Herbison, accused the prosecutor of arresting the defendants without probable cause as an unethical "investigatory technique", then adding and dropping charges strategically before hearings to avoid having to produce evidence against the defendants. In October 2014, when evidence tampering charges were dropped against Dylan Adams just days after he was charged with rape, Herbison said: "If those reports are correct, it means that they're just playing games," Herbison said. "They charged him with something less serious in order to keep him locked up, and then when it comes time to answer questions about the charge, they dismiss that and charge him with a more serious charge in circuit court, where he's not entitled to a preliminary hearing."

He also noted the state's similar treatment of Mark Pearcy to avoid hearings. In August 2014, the state failed to arrange transport for Pearcy to the courthouse, causing the hearing to be rescheduled for September; but just before the new hearing, the charges against him were dropped with the explanation given that Pearcy was facing unrelated federal charges and they were being forced to wait to proceed with the state charges. Herbison said the laws regarding the charges would not preclude the state charges. "If the state is claiming that is the case, the prosecutor is either ill-informed or being disingenuous," he said. Charges were never reinstated, and the case against his brother, Jeffrey, was similarly dropped.

Zach Adams's attorney, Jennifer Thompson, repeatedly said that evidence was not turned over to the defense. For example, in 2014, DA Matt Stowe made a statement that because Holly was menstruating at the time of her abduction, there was a lot of DNA evidence in Zachary Adams's Decatur County home. No DNA evidence was ever turned over to the defense or produced at trial. She also said that the medical examiner referred to materials that were never given to her.

On December 17, 2014, nine months after Zach Adams's arrest, Judge Creed McGinley chastised prosecutors for delays in the case and for the state's failure to turn over evidence to the defense. "I am absolutely out of patience with these cases not moving," he said. Judge McGinley ordered that a bill of particulars be filed for Zachary Adams's case within seven days and that discovery take place immediately. The prosecution ignored both deadlines. In response, attorneys for the men filed motions to dismiss charges. The motions filed accused the state of "silence or stonewalling", stating that, among other things, the state had yet to disclose evidence that the skull found belonged to Bobo. "It would appear to me if they had a skull with a dental match they would have given that to us right away. It's a little suspicious why we don't have that forensic information," said Autry's attorney Fletcher Long.

After the hearing in December 2014, a dispute regarding the handling of the case led the TBI to briefly drop its investigation of the case and cut ties with the entire district, saying District Attorney Matt Stowe had accused them of misconduct. The TBI agreed to come back on the case after Stowe recused himself from the case and Jennifer Nichols was appointed as special prosecutor. After Stowe's allegations of misconduct by the TBI, the defense attorneys working on the case stated that they intended to subpoena Stowe to question him regarding the alleged misconduct. Emails by Wally Kirby, executive director of Tennessee District Attorney's Conference, revealed that Stowe accused the TBI of compromising the case by proceeding "so slowly that the culprits were always one step ahead and that TBI . . . was leaking information and possibly covering up evidence."

== Media coverage ==
The case attracted a high level of national media coverage. Discovery Channel published an article several months after Bobo's disappearance, discussing how the high levels of media coverage, including some instances of inaccurate media coverage, hurt the investigation. A notable example of misinformation was the description of her last known movements. Early reports inaccurately stated that Bobo was dragged into the woods. Clint later clarified that Holly had, in fact, walked with the man wearing camouflage into the woods, either willingly or by coercion. This clarification led to rumors that Clint had changed his story and was a suspect in his sister's disappearance. Whitney Duncan defended him in an April 17 Twitter statement, stating that he was innocent and not a suspect in the case. Some early sources also erroneously reported that the skull was found on property owned by Zach Adams's family. Her body was found 10 miles away from Adams's property on land owned by the Tubbs family.

Police received scores of erroneous tips from the public, including a number of "psychics". These false tips made it difficult for police to identify important leads.

On September 29, 2017, the ABC Network aired an investigative journalism segment, "Justice for Holly Bobo", on its prime-time television program 20/20.

== See also ==
- Crime in Tennessee
- List of kidnappings
- List of solved missing person cases (post-2000)
