= Coach (Survivor contestant) =

American reality television personality

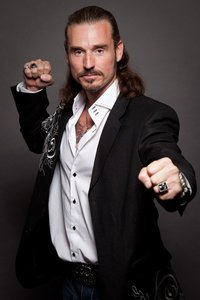
- Wade in 2010
- Born: Benjamin Wade; September 18, 1971 (age 55); Knoxville, Tennessee, U.S.
- Television: Survivor: Tocantins; Survivor: Heroes vs. Villains; Survivor: South Pacific (runner-up); Survivor 50: In the Hands of the Fans
- Spouse: Jessica Newton (m. 2011)
- Children: 3

Benjamin "Coach" Wade (born September 18, 1971) is an American reality television personality best known for being a contestant on Survivor: Tocantins, Survivor: Heroes vs. Villains, Survivor: South Pacific and Survivor 50: In the Hands of the Fans. He grew up in Knoxville, Tennessee, and later moved to Susanville, California, to found the Susanville Symphony and pursue film work.

== Early life ==
Benjamin Wade grew up in Knoxville, Tennessee, the son of William and Cherri Wade. He attended Tyson Middle School and West High School in Knoxville. He began playing trumpet as a teenager with the Knoxville Youth Symphony Orchestra. He majored in business administration at the University of Tennessee and graduated in 1993, before obtaining a master's degree in music education from the University of Nevada.

== Soccer ==
In 1997, Wade was hired at Simpson University in Redding, California, to coach the women's soccer team. During that time he led the Lady Red Hawks to 2 NAIA final 8 appearances. His combined record was 18–12–3. From Simpson he was hired to coach the men's and women's soccer teams at Patten University in Oakland, California. During his two-year tenure, Wade led the women's team to a .500 record going 15–15–2 and led the men's team to a conference championship in 2000 going 16–4–1. He spent 22 years coaching collegiate soccer teams and ended up at Southwest Baptist University in Bolivar, Missouri, from 2005 to 2009.

After his appearance on Survivor, Wade was fired as head women's soccer coach for the university. The university's athletic director Brent Good had fired Wade for not telling the school that he would be taking two months off in order to participate in Survivor, instead saying he was receiving cancer testing. Good stated in an interview, "He [Wade] said he was going to be gone for a week...the week went beyond that, which went beyond that, which went beyond that." According to Good, Wade left the team with two weeks left in the season in October but did not return to the school until December.

In 2010, he signed a contract to coach the men's soccer team at Lassen College, a community college located in Susanville. On December 10, 2013, Wade was hired as the first ever men's soccer head coach at Lake Tahoe Community College. After 20 years of coaching collegiate soccer he retired from that position in November 2015 to spend more time with his family. In 2017, Wade came out of retirement, taking the position of head coach for Redding Royals FC semi-pro soccer team. Redding Royals won the Pacific Premier League championship under coach Wade, with the team celebrating the win in July 2017.

=== Lassen College Women's Soccer ===
In 2002, Wade began coaching at Lassen Community College, led the program to a 61–6–1 record during his tenure. With an overall career record of 102–26–3, Wade ranks second on the junior college coaching list for winning percentage. He was honored as the Golden Valley Conference Coach of the Year in both 2002 and 2003.

== Music ==
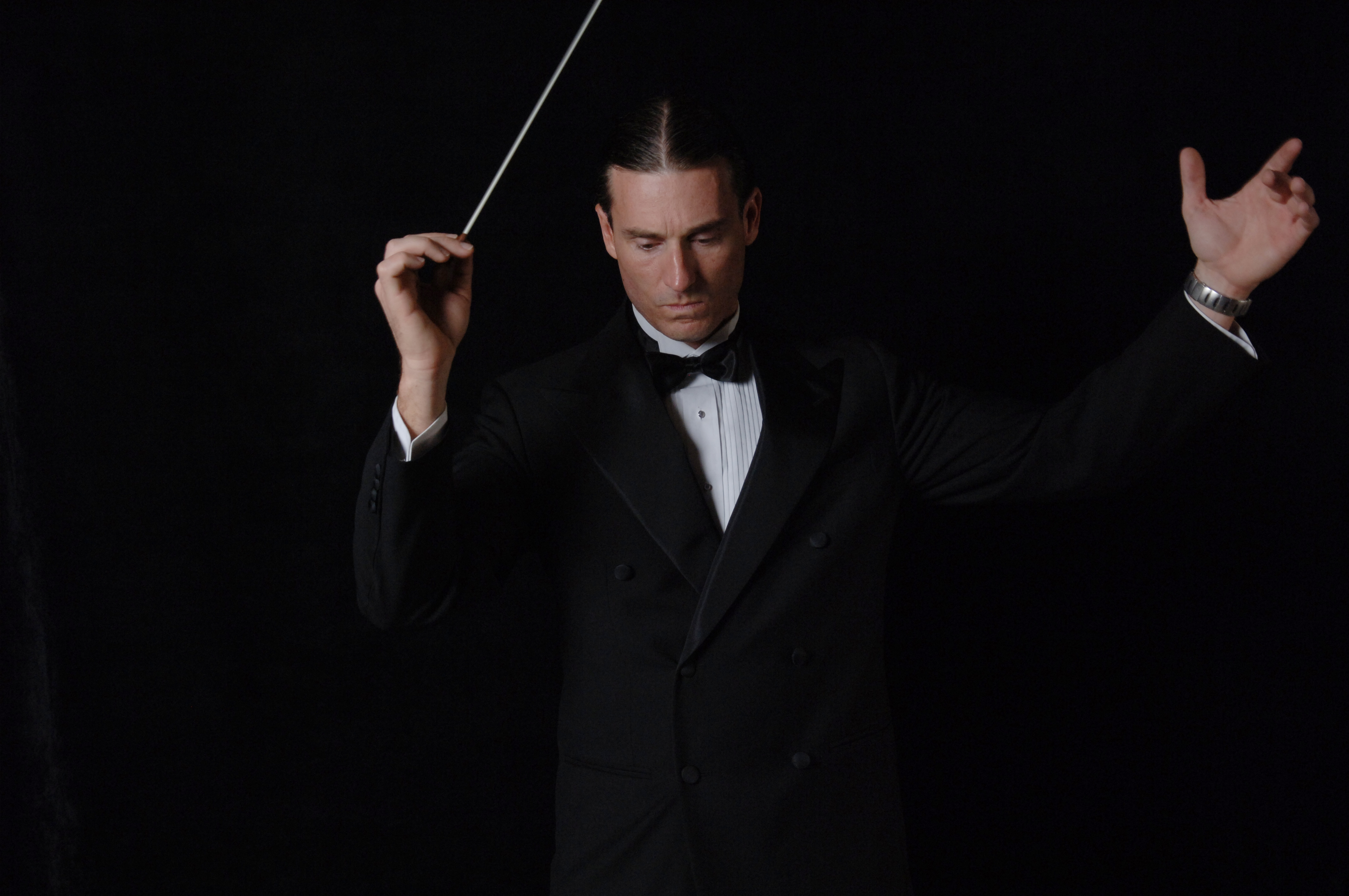
Ben Wade conducting symphony orchestra

Wade has played trumpet professionally with the Indianapolis Symphony, the Knoxville Symphony, and the New York Metropolitan Opera.

Wade co-founded the Susanville Symphony in 2003, and remains the orchestra's principal conductor and artistic director. He has composed several classical music pieces, premiering his ballet The Four Elements in 2011 with the Susanville Symphony. A documentary featuring the orchestra, Small Town Big Symphony, was filmed by his brother, Pete Wade, in 2006.

Wade also taught music history at Lassen College.

== Survivor ==
=== Tocantins ===
Wade was selected to participate on Survivor: Tocantins, the 18th season of the series, in 2009. Being one of the most controversial characters to ever play the game, he was recognized as the main antagonist of this season; however, host Jeff Probst has stated he doesn't feel like Wade did anything to earn this reputation. While in the game, he gave nicknames to his fellow tribemates: James "J.T." Thomas, Jr., the "warrior", Stephen Fishbach, the "wizard", Tyson Apostol, the "assistant coach" (to which Apostol later wished to upgrade himself to "co-coach"), and himself, the "Dragon Slayer". These players together formed the "Warrior Alliance". Wade ultimately placed fifth and was the fifth member of the jury, voting for Thomas to win the title of Sole Survivor.

Wade was perhaps most famous for telling his fellow castaways stories of adventure from his previous exploits as a professional kayaker. Some of his stories were chronicled in the book A Voyage Beyond Reason, written by Tom Gauthier, although some of those stories were later alleged to be false.

=== Heroes vs. Villains ===
For the 20th season of the series, CBS brought back popular "heroes" and "villains" from previous seasons. Wade was selected to participate for the Villains tribe, and was the ninth person voted off and the first member of the jury.

During his time in the game, he was a part of the Villains majority alliance and had a close alliance and relationship with fellow Villain Jerri Manthey, leading some to believe that the two had a possible romantic connection. He appeared to be in the majority alliance on his tribe at the time of his elimination, but outsiders Sandra Diaz-Twine, who would be the eventual winner, and Courtney Yates managed to convince the alliance that he was not trustworthy, and he was sent to the jury in lieu of Yates. At the reunion, Wade mentioned that after watching this season and Tocantins, he realized how people viewed him, and decided that he did not want to be viewed as "The Dragon Slayer" anymore.

=== South Pacific ===
In 2011, Wade returned to Survivor for the third time in Survivor: South Pacific, as the self-styled 'Zen Slayer' and one of two returning contestants (the other being Ozzy Lusth). During the season, Wade was assigned to the Upolu tribe through random draw, gaining the friendship of Edna Ma on the first day. On the first night, he made an alliance with Sophie Clarke, Rick Nelson, Albert Destrade, and Brandon Hantz, who later revealed to Wade that he was Russell Hantz's nephew. Wade decided to trust Brandon Hantz, but still was wary of his outbursts. Wade and his four alliance members eliminated Christine Shields-Markoski, Stacey Powell and Mikayla Wingle, sending them all to Redemption Island. At camp, Wade found the Hidden Immunity Idol with the help of Destrade and Clarke, keeping it a secret from Hantz and Ma. Later on, Wade staged the Idol's "discovery" for Hantz, under the guise of a prayer ritual. The tribes merged with six members each, prompting Wade to attempt to sway former Savaii member John Cochran over in order to avoid a tie. Wade's alliance, now including Cochran, voted off the remaining Savaiis. Both Cochran and Ma, knowing that they were on the outside of the alliance, tried to get Wade to betray his original alliance; however, he decided against it. He went on to vote off Cochran first, followed by Ma. Wade, Clarke and Destrade ended up in the Final Three, and Wade finished second place only to Clarke, who won in a 6–3–0 vote.

=== In the Hands of the Fans ===
On May 28, 2025, it was confirmed that Wade would return for a fourth season of Survivor, joining the cast of Survivor 50: In the Hands of the Fans. He finished 12th/13th after a duo's twist made him tied to contestant Chrissy Hofbeck, who ended up being targeted after Rick Devens "found" a fake immunity idol which he said was real. He played his shot in the dark, but it was not successful, leaving him and Hofbeck to be voted out in a 10-1-1 vote.

=== Legacy ===
Coach Wade was inducted to the Survivor Hall of Fame in 2015. In September 2020, Coach Wade was ranked the "20th Greatest Survivor" by former castaway Russell Hantz.

== Personal life ==
Wade married Jessica Newton, a dance studio owner, on December 31, 2011. Together, they have two children, daughter Lenna (born May 8, 2014) and Bekston (born October 13, 2016), and one more child from Newton's previous relationship, Avvan (born February 28, 2009).

== Filmography ==
=== Television ===
Year	Title	Role/Participation	Notes
2009	Survivor: Tocantins	Contestant	Finished 5th place
2010	Survivor: Heroes vs. Villains	Contestant	Finished 12th place
2011	Survivor: South Pacific	Contestant	Runner-up (2nd place)
2026	Survivor 50: In the Hands of the Fans	Contestant	Finished 12th place

=== Film ===
Year	Title	Role	Notes
2008	Small Town Big Symphony	Self - Conductor	Documentary film
2011	180	Gavin Larson	Feature film
2014	Isabel: A Love Story	Greg Filmore	Romance/drama film
2020	Marty’s Mountain	Producer	Short drama film
2021	Ruger the Rude Dog	Soccer Coach	Family film

== Bibliography ==
- No Turning Back: The South American Expedition of a Dragon Slayer; Shapato Publishing Co. (2011), ISBN 978-0983352679

Preceded by Phillip Sheppard	Runner-Up of Survivor; Survivor: South Pacific	Succeeded by Sabrina Thompson
