= CBS Watch =

American magazine

- Editor: Rachel Clarke
- Former editors: Jennifer Goddard, Jeremy Murphy
- Photographer: Christopher Ross
- Categories: Celebrity, Lifestyle, Fashion, Travel
- Frequency: 6 issues per year
- Publisher: CBS and Manifest
- Total circulation: 200,000
- Founder: Jeremy Murphy, Michael Rizzi
- First issue: January 2006; 20 years ago
- Final issue: November/December 2022
- Company: Paramount Global
- Country: United States
- Language: English
- Website: cbswatchmagazine.com
- ISSN: 2151-0822

CBS Watch!, also called Watch! Magazine, was a bi-monthly magazine commissioned by Paramount Global and published by Manifest. The glossy print magazine, covered celebrity, fashion, beauty, travel, culture and wellness through articles mainly about actors and hosts involved with programming on the CBS broadcast network and predecessor brands like Showtime, Pop TV, The CW, and Smithsonian Channel. The magazine was published bimonthly in the United States with both newsstand and subscription distribution. Post COVID outbreak, the magazine's frequency was reduced to quarterly. The last issue was published in November/December 2022. CBS Watch had a circulation number of approximately 200,000 copies per edition. It was created by former CBS Vice President Jeremy Murphy, who left in 2016 to start his own company 360bespoke.

== History ==
The magazine launched in January 2006 as a quarterly and increased to six times a year in 2007.

In 2010, a pictorial shot by Patrick Demarchelier featuring The Big Bang Theory actress Kaley Cuoco-Sweeting received national media coverage in USA Today and on Entertainment Tonight.

Watch! has conducted photo shoots around the world, including in Italy, Ireland, London and Paris. A photo from the Paris shoot featuring Cote DePablo walking two French poodles on Avenue Montaigne was reprinted on the cover of Women's Wear Daily during 2012 New York Fashion Week.

On June 3, 2014, Watch was the subject of a national televised special on the TVGN network, whose producers followed editors during two photo shoots in London the previous December. The magazine photographed Under the Dome star Rachelle Lefevre at The Four Seasons Hotel Hampshire in the English countryside, then NCIS star Michael Weatherly at the Mandarin Oriental Hyde Park, London. The behind the scenes footage formed the basis for a 30-minute special called Watch TV.

Also in September 2014, Watch! began publishing monthly specially themed issues devoted to a single topic exclusively for newsstand audiences. Among the special issues are an NCIS edition as well as ones devoted to Star Trek, the anniversary of The Wizard of Oz on CBS, and The Academy of Country Music Awards.

The magazine commissioned British violinist Charlie Siem to create a musical score for marketing and promotional purposes in 2014. Siem recorded a five-minute song called "Canopy" in a church in London with the 22-member English Chamber Orchestra. The magazine commissioned a second five-minute behind-the-scenes video that featured Siem and the orchestra performing the piece in its entirety.

In 2024, Jeremy Murphy published a book about his experience editing the magazine.
