= Grant Mattos =

American football player (born 1981)

Profile
- Position: Wide receiver

Personal information
- Born: March 12, 1981 (age 45); Mountain View, California, U.S.
- Listed height: 6 ft 2 in (1.88 m)
- Listed weight: 225 lb (102 kg)

Career information
- High school: Saint Francis (Mountain View, California)
- College: Southern California

Career history
- 2003: San Diego Chargers
- 2004–2005: Denver Broncos*
- 2005: Detroit Lions*
- 2006: Tennessee Titans*
- * Offseason or practice squad member only
- Stats at Pro Football Reference

Grant Logan Mattos (born March 12, 1981) is an American former professional National Football League (NFL) wide receiver and special teams player who appeared in six games played for the San Diego Chargers, and was on the practice roster for three other teams, over a four-year career. He was later a contestant on Survivor: Redemption Island, the 22nd season of U.S. Survivor, where he finished in eighth place.

== High school and college career ==
Mattos went to Saint Francis High School in Mountain View, California. He then played college football at the University of Southern California after transferring from Foothill College in Los Altos Hills, California and graduated in 2003. In 2003, he was part of the team's Orange Bowl triumph. During his time at USC, he received high praise from teammate Carson Palmer, a future NFL star QB who said of Mattos: "Having a guy like Grant Mattos come in has been great, he's really gonna set the tone for the receivers. He's out there working harder than anyone on this team and he'll catch any ball, his hands are unbelievable. He's big and physical too so we can put him at tight end or receiver and he's strong enough to do both. It's gonna be exciting to see what he does this year. His story of how he got here is amazing, I'm not surprised at all that Coach Chow went out and found some guy from some place and brought him in with a chance to start" "He has awesome hands and he doesn't drop anything. He's a lot like (ex-USC receiver) Matt Nickels. Only he has more potential. He's bigger and stronger and capable of more."

== NFL career ==
After his college career, Mattos played for the San Diego Chargers. He earned a spot on the Chargers roster in 2003 with his impressive performances in training camp, despite having not even been initially recruited by a major college. He also was not selected in any round in the NFL draft. He lasted two years with the Chargers, and four years in the League overall, also being signed by the Denver Broncos, and later the Tennessee Titans. Knee problems limited his effectiveness and chances of game action in later years.

== Survivor ==
Grant Mattos appeared on Survivor: Redemption Island, the 22nd season of the reality TV show Survivor. On the Ometepe tribe, Mattos quickly formed a close friendship and strong alliance with the eventual winner Rob Mariano. He was part of the majority alliance of 6 formed early with Rob Mariano, Ashley Underwood, Matthew Elrod/Wyatt Nash, Andrea Boehlke, and Natalie Tenerelli; with Phillip Sheppard then replacing Matt Elrod in the alliance of 6 after Matt Elrod's Day 5 blindside. This alliance became commonly known as both the "Ometepe 6" and also as "Stealth R Us", a term coined by the eccentric Sheppard. Mattos also established himself as one of the physically strongest players in the game, dominating many of the pre-merge challenges to help Ometepe hit the merge with the numbers advantage over the opposing Zapatera tribe. When the tribes merged, the former Ometepe members used their majority to systematically eliminate those outside their alliance. Grant Mattos also won a few individual immunities and a cake reward that he chose to share with Andrea Boehlke and Rob Mariano, his 2 closest allies within the alliance. Mattos was nearly voted out in the first tribal council e merge, but survived 6 votes to 5 against Elrod, fooling Matthew Elrod to vote for proposed target Steve Wright. On Day 35 after intended target Ashley Underwood won the Immunity/Reward Challenge, Grant Mattos was blindsided and voted out, as he was deemed by Mariano and the other tribe mates to be the largest threat of all the games remaining players to win the jury's vote at the end. Rob Mariano would be the deciding vote to eliminate Mattos, electing to vote him out instead of Natalie Tenerelli, another close ally, but one considered far less of a jury or immunity challenge threat. Mattos was then officially eliminated by coming last in the final Redemption Island duel, behind Andrea Boehlke, Mike Chiesl, and Matthew Elrod, dropping his final finish in the game down to 8th.

Mattos holds the distinction of having dropped the most places in Survivor history through the Redemption Island twist (5th to 8th), which was a new twist added in seasons 22 and also used in seasons 23 and 27. Until ex-NFL player Brad Culpepper in Season 34 Survivor: Game Changers taking 2nd place, Mattos had held the record for the most days lasted in a season among all former major league pro athletes by lasting 35 days consecutively on the main island (36 when counting his official elimination after losing in the final Redemption Island duel a day later).

== Personal life ==
During the Survivor: Redemption Island reunion, Mattos confirmed that following his return from competing in the game, he married actress Christina Cox. They were married by eloping. The date of their elopement and marriage was October 1, 2010, only about a week after returning from the airing of that season's Survivor. They now have one daughter, born in December 2013.

Before and in the years after Survivor, Mattos worked as full-time yoga instructor at City Yoga LA. He then became a yoga instructor at Moda Yoga International in Los Angeles, California in mid-2013. He moved to New York City in September 2015 and works at Moda Yoga NYC.

Mattos is a member of Team Gleason, a team that is headed by his friend and ex-NFL player and ALS sufferer Steve Gleason. In February and March 2016 he ran a fundraising campaign for the Steve Gleason team, which was one of many efforts by various team members to raise awareness and money to help research for ALS, and also medical care for the many who suffer with it. As the climax of the campaign Mattos participated in the 10 km fundraising run in New Orleans on March 26, 2016. He was the 2nd highest fundraiser of the large team, raising $1750, and the team collectively went well beyond their $20,000 goal by raising more than $66,000.
