= Philip Sheppard =

Philip or Phillip Sheppard may refer to:

- Philip Sheppard (biologist) (1921-1976), British geneticist and lepidopterist
- Philip Sheppard (musician) (born 1969), English musician
- Phillip Sheppard, American contestant of Survivor: Redemption Island and Survivor: Caramoan
