= Survivor: Redemption Island =

- Season 22
- Region 1 DVD cover
- Presented by: Jeff Probst
- No. of days: 39
- No. of castaways: 18
- Winner: Rob Mariano
- Runner-up: Phillip Sheppard
- Location: San Juan del Sur, Nicaragua
- Sprint Player of the Season: Rob Mariano
- No. of episodes: 15

Release
- Original network: CBS
- Original release: February 16 – May 15, 2011

Additional information
- Filming dates: August 16 – September 23, 2010

Season chronology
- ← Previous; Nicaragua Next → South Pacific

Survivor: Redemption Island is the twenty-second season of the American CBS competitive reality television series Survivor. It premiered on February 16, 2011. Applications were due in January 2010, and filming lasted from August to September 2010. The season was filmed near San Juan del Sur, Nicaragua, the same location as the previous season. The season featured returning players Russell Hantz and Rob Mariano, alongside 16 new contestants.

Mariano was named the winner in the final episode on May 15, 2011, defeating Phillip Sheppard and Natalie Tenerelli in an 8–1–0 jury vote. In addition, Mariano won $100,000 as the "Sprint Player of the Season," receiving 40% of the fans' votes; Matt Elrod, with 36%, received the next-highest total.

== Format ==
Survivor is a reality television show based on the Swedish show Expedition Robinson, created by Mark Burnett and Charlie Parsons. The series follows a number of participants isolated in a remote location, where they must provide food, fire, and shelter. One participant is removed from the series by majority vote every three days, with challenges held to give a reward (ranging from living- and food-related prizes to a car) and immunity from being voted out of the series. The last remaining player receives a prize of $1,000,000.

== Contestants ==
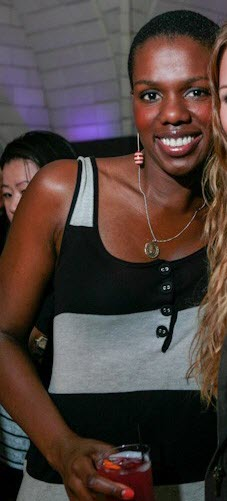
Francesca Hogi

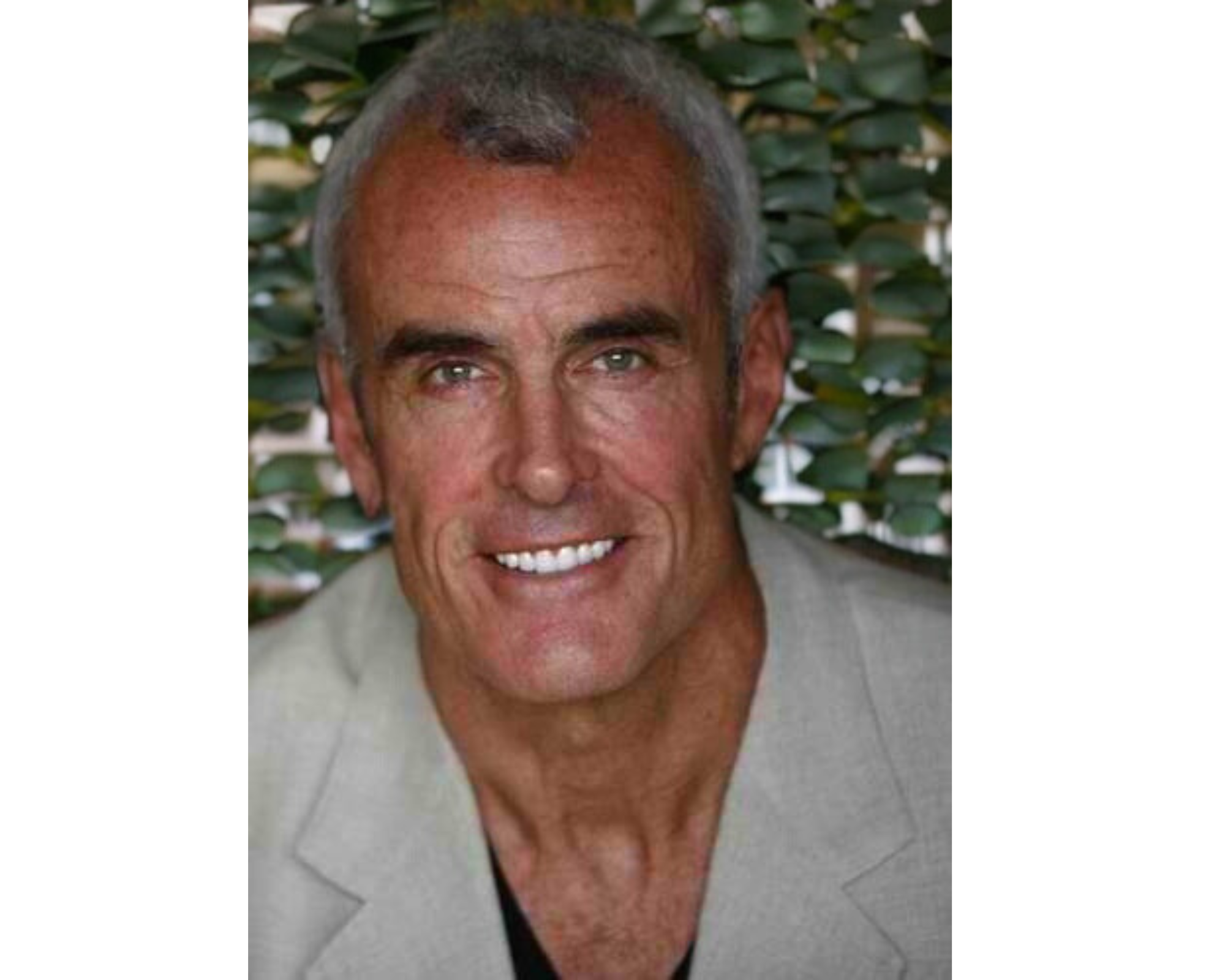
Steve Wright

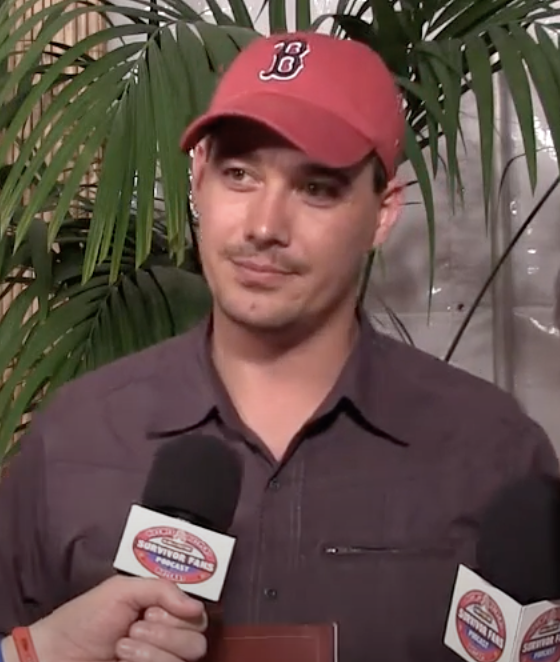
Rob Mariano

The players were initially split into two tribes of nine, each with one returning player: Ometepe and Zapatera, both named after the islands in Lake Nicaragua. Redemption Island featured the return of Rob Mariano and Russell Hantz, who both previously appeared on Survivor: Heroes vs. Villains and appeared separately on Marquesas and All-Stars (Mariano) and Samoa (Hantz). Their feud was a running storyline in the early episodes of Heroes vs. Villains, and was rekindled months later during the season's live finale. While the sixteen new players were initially assigned tribes prior to the start of the game, Rob and Russell drew buffs to determine which tribe they joined.

Notable new contestants include former NFL players Steve Wright and Grant Mattos; and former Miss Maine USA Ashley Underwood.

List of Survivor: Redemption Island contestants
Contestant	Age	From	Tribe		Main game (Note: Elimination order is based on when the contestant was voted out at Tribal Council.)		Redemption Island	
Contestant	Age	From	Original	Merged	Finish	Day	Finish	Day
Francesca Hogi	36	Washington, D.C.	Ometepe		1st voted out	Day 3	Lost duel 1	Day 6
Matt Elrod (Returned to game)			Ometepe		2nd voted out	Day 5	1st returnee	Day 19
Russell Hantz Samoa & Heroes vs. Villains	37	Dayton, Texas	Zapatera		3rd voted out	Day 8	Lost duel 2	Day 10
Kristina Kell	46	Malibu, California	Ometepe		4th voted out	Day 11	Lost duel 3	Day 12
Krista Klumpp	25	Columbia, South Carolina	Zapatera		5th voted out	Day 13	Lost duel 4	Day 14
Stephanie Valencia	26	Long Beach, California	Zapatera		6th voted out	Day 16	Lost duel 5	Day 17
Sarita White	36	Santa Monica, California	Zapatera		7th voted out	Day 18	Lost duel 6	Day 19
Matt Elrod	22	Nashville, Tennessee	Ometepe	Murlonio	8th voted out	Day 21	Lost duel 11; 6th jury member	Day 36
Mike Chiesl	31	Del Mar, California	Zapatera	Murlonio	9th voted out	Day 22	Lost duel 11; 7th jury member	Day 36
David Murphy	31	West Hollywood, California	Zapatera	Murlonio	10th voted out	Day 24	Lost duel 7; 1st jury member	Day 25
Julie Wolfe	50	Oceanside, California	Zapatera	Murlonio	11th voted out	Day 27	Lost duel 8; 2nd jury member	Day 28
Ralph Kiser	45	Lebanon, Virginia	Zapatera	Murlonio	12th voted out	Day 30	Lost duel 10; 4th jury member	Day 33
Steve Wright	51	Huntington Beach, California	Zapatera	Murlonio	13th voted out	Day 30	Lost duel 9; 3rd jury member	Day 31
Andrea Boehlke (Returned to game)			Ometepe	Murlonio	14th voted out	Day 32	2nd returnee	Day 36
Grant Mattos	29	West Hollywood, California	Ometepe	Murlonio	15th voted out	Day 35	Lost duel 11; 5th jury member	Day 36
Andrea Boehlke	21	Random Lake, Wisconsin	Ometepe	Murlonio	16th voted out 8th jury member	Day 37		
Ashley Underwood	25	Benton, Maine	Ometepe	Murlonio	17th voted out 9th jury member	Day 38		
Natalie Tenerelli	19	Acton, California	Ometepe	Murlonio	2nd runner-up	Day 39		
Phillip Sheppard	52	Santa Monica, California	Ometepe	Murlonio	Runner-up	Day 39		
Rob Mariano Marquesas, All-Stars & Heroes vs. Villains	34	Pensacola, Florida	Ometepe	Murlonio	Sole Survivor	Day 39		

=== Future appearances ===
Phillip Sheppard, Andrea Boehlke, and Francesca Hogi returned for Survivor: Caramoan. Natalie Tenerelli and Stephanie Valencia were included on the public poll to choose the cast of Survivor: Cambodia, but neither received enough votes to be chosen. Boehlke returned for the third time in Survivor: Game Changers. Russell Hantz returned to the game on an international level as he appeared on Australian Survivor: Champions v Contenders (2018). Rob Mariano returned for the thirty-ninth season Survivor: Island of the Idols serving as a mentor to new contestants, and returned again the next season to compete on Survivor: Winners at War.

Outside of Survivor, Mariano competed on Deal or No Deal Island. In 2025, Mariano competed on the third season of the Peacock reality TV series The Traitors.

== Season summary ==
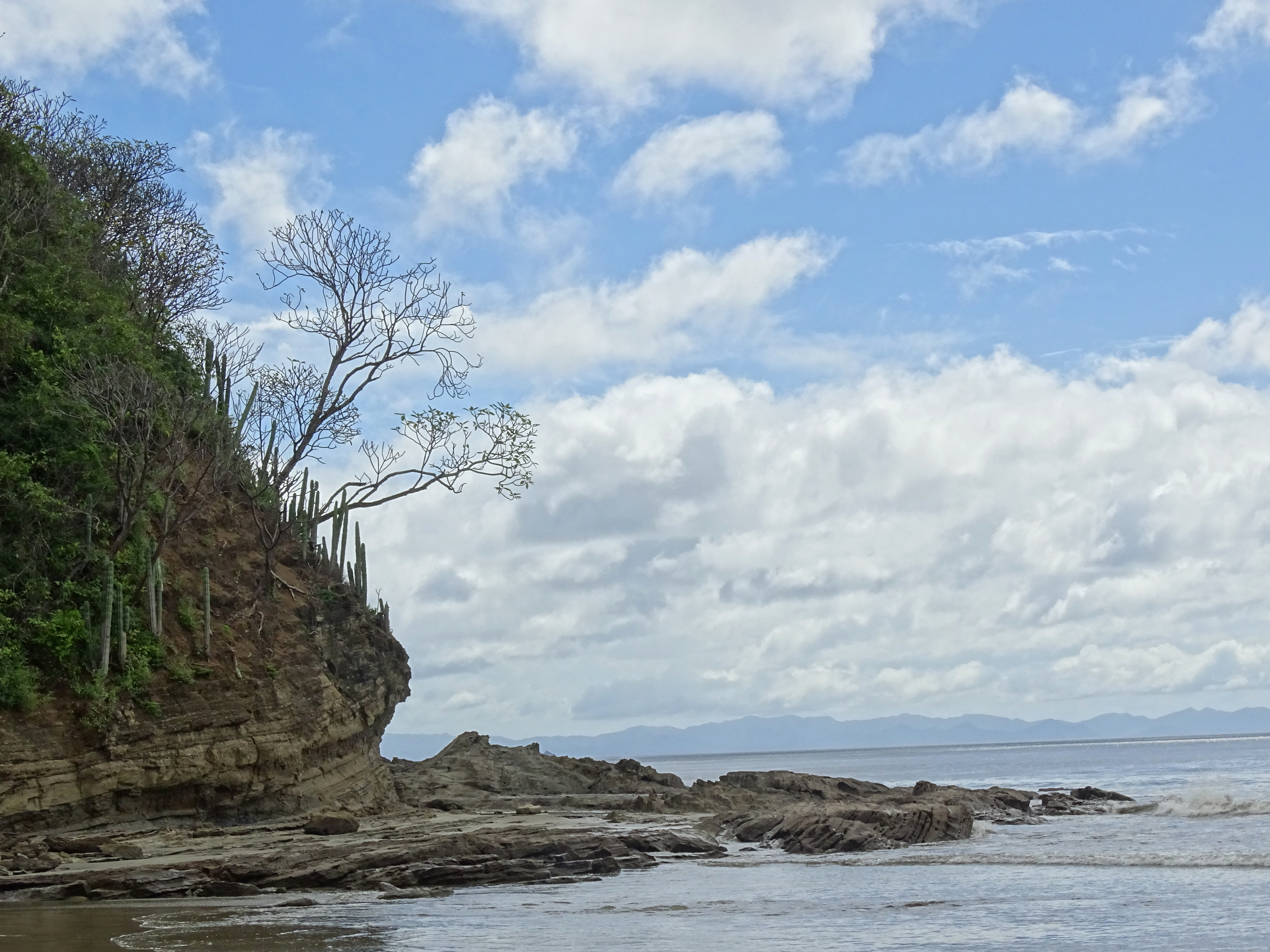
The season filmed in San Juan del Sur in Nicaragua.

Sixteen new castaways, previously divided into two tribes, Ometepe and Zapatera, were joined by returning contestants, "Boston" Rob Mariano and Russell Hantz, with Rob joining Ometepe and Russell joining Zapatera by random draw. The tribes were then told about Redemption Island, a secluded location where voted out players would go to compete in challenges for a chance to return to the game.

Rob quickly proved to be leader of Ometepe, and kept wary of the hidden immunity idol, including sending one of his own alliance, Matt, to Redemption Island while trying to flush it out. On Zapatera, the bulk of the tribe recognized the threat that Russell could be, throwing a challenge in order to vote Russell out; Russell would lose to Matt at the next Redemption Island challenge. Matt would continue to win several more duels. After Russell's elimination, Zapatera faltered due to lack of cohesion within the tribe, and eventually approached the merge with only five members remaining, while Ometepe had six.

The tribes merged with 12 players left in the game, including Matt, who returned from Redemption Island. Zapatera attempted to lure Matt to their side in order to tie the vote; while Matt considered blindsiding Rob, he eventually decided against it, telling this to Rob in an attempt to prove his loyalty. Despite this, Rob decided Matt could not be trusted, using his alliance to send Matt back to Redemption Island, establishing a firm Ometepe majority. The former Ometepe tribe used their numerical advantage to completely eliminate the remaining former members of Zapatera, starting with Mike, who dominated with his close friend Matt at Redemption Island. Meanwhile, Rob orchestrated the eliminations of those who he felt would be threatening to him, including Andrea and close allies Grant and Ashley. The final three were Rob, Natalie, and Phillip; both Natalie and Phillip were criticized by the jury for simply following in Rob's footsteps, and Rob was voted the Sole Survivor in a vote of 8-1-0.

Challenge winners and eliminations by episode
Episode			Redemption Island		Challenge winner(s)	Eliminated	
No.	Title	Original air date	Winner	Eliminated	Challenge winner(s)	Tribe	Player
1	"You're Looking at the New Leader of Your Tribe"	February 16, 2011	None		Zapatera	Ometepe	Francesca
2	"You Own My Vote"	February 23, 2011	None		Zapatera	Ometepe	Matt
3	"Keep Hope Alive"	March 2, 2011	Matt	Francesca	Ometepe	Zapatera	Russell
4	"Don't You Work for Me?"	March 9, 2011	Matt	Russell	Zapatera	Ometepe	Kristina
5	"We Hate Our Tribe"	March 16, 2011	Matt	Kristina	Ometepe	Zapatera	Krista
6	"Their Red-Headed Step Child"	March 23, 2011	Matt	Krista	Ometepe	Zapatera	Stephanie
7	"It Don't Take a Smart One"	March 30, 2011	Matt	Stephanie	Ometepe	Zapatera	Sarita
8	"This Game Respects Big Moves"	April 6, 2011	Matt (Note: Returned to the game upon winning the Redemption Island challenge.)	Sarita	Natalie	Murlonio	Matt
9	"The Buddy System"	April 13, 2011	None		Grant	Murlonio	Mike
9	"The Buddy System"	April 13, 2011	None		Andrea	Murlonio	David
10	"Rice Wars"	April 20, 2011	Mike	David	Rob	Murlonio	Julie
10	"Rice Wars"	April 20, 2011	Matt	David	Rob	Murlonio	Julie
11	"A Mystery Package"	April 27, 2011	Matt	Julie	Grant [Andrea, Rob]	Murlonio	Ralph
11	"A Mystery Package"	April 27, 2011	Mike	Julie	Rob	Murlonio	Steve
12	"You Mangled My Nets"	May 4, 2011	Mike	Steve	Rob	Murlonio	Andrea
12	"You Mangled My Nets"	May 4, 2011	Matt	Steve	Rob	Murlonio	Andrea
12	"You Mangled My Nets"	May 4, 2011	Ralph	Steve	Rob	Murlonio	Andrea
13	"Too Close For Comfort"	May 11, 2011	Mike	Ralph	Ashley [Natalie]	Murlonio	Grant
13	"Too Close For Comfort"	May 11, 2011	Matt	Ralph	Ashley [Natalie]	Murlonio	Grant
13	"Too Close For Comfort"	May 11, 2011	Andrea	Ralph	Ashley [Natalie]	Murlonio	Grant
14	"Seems Like a No Brainer"	May 15, 2011	Andrea	Grant	Ashley	Murlonio	Andrea
14	"Seems Like a No Brainer"	May 15, 2011	Andrea	Matt	Ashley	Murlonio	Andrea
14	"Seems Like a No Brainer"	May 15, 2011	Andrea	Mike	Ashley	Murlonio	Andrea
14	"Seems Like a No Brainer"	May 15, 2011			Rob	Murlonio	Ashley
15	"Reunion"	May 15, 2011					

In the case of the immunity and reward winner being able to share their reward with others, the invitees are in brackets.

== Episodes ==
No. overall	No. in season	Title	Rating/share (household)	Rating/share (18-49)	Original release date	U.S. viewers (millions)	Weekly rank
321	1	"You're Looking at the New Leader of Your Tribe"	6.2/10	3.2/9	February 16, 2011	11.155	#15
Sixteen castaways split into two tribes, Ometepe and Zapatera, arrived on the beach on board a Mil Mi-17 from the Nicaraguan Air Force. After Jeff welcomed the group to the game, he announced that two additional players would be joining them, at which point Rob and Russell then arrived in a second helicopter. Jeff went over the two's history in the game and then the two drew for tribes. Rob drew the orange Ometepe tribe buff, while Russell drew the purple Zapatera tribe buff. Jeff then announced the new twist of Survivor, which was Redemption Island. At Ometepe, Rob caught Kristina looking for a clue to the Hidden Immunity Idol. Rob then talked to Phillip about keeping an eye out for a woman's alliance on the tribe, since the women outnumbered the men 5–4. However, Phillip was uneasy with the idea and approached Kristina about forming an alliance and siding with the women. Over at Zapatera, Russell made his usual early game move and made an alliance with Stephanie, and talked about taking her to the merge. On Day 3, Kristina went on a hunt for the Hidden Immunity Idol by herself without any clues and actually managed to find it. Francesca, Kristina, and Phillip then formed an alliance, but Phillip annoyed the women with his aggressive questioning about whom to vote off at Tribal Council.: Reward/Immunity Challenge: The tribes would push four blocks along a track which would form a set of stairs to the first level of a temple. The tribe would race to the first level where one tribe member would cut a series of ropes which would release a second set of stairs to the top level of the temple. The tribe would then race to the top level of the temple where there would be a block puzzle. The first tribe to complete their puzzle would win flint and immunity.; The first combined Immunity/Reward Challenge was won by Zapatera, when Ometepe fell behind early. They managed to catch up, but at the puzzle portion of the challenge, they did not have enough time to quickly assemble the puzzle and narrowly lost. After the challenge, Kristina told Francesca and Phillip that she had the Hidden Immunity Idol, and she told Francesca of her plan to blindside Rob by getting the other three Ometepe women to vote for Kristina, while their three person alliance votes for Rob. Francesca was concerned that it was too early to vote out Rob, and that they did not have the numbers to stay in the game long-term. Francesca also wanted to vote out Natalie, as she was seen as the weakest link of the tribe. Rob told the other Ometepe members (Andrea, Ashley, Grant, Matt, and Natalie), that he was concerned that the Francesca/Kristina/Phillip alliance may have already found a Hidden Immunity Idol and they should split their vote between Francesca and Kristina. At Tribal Council, the Francesca/Kristina/Phillip pact imploded when Francesca openly said that Rob would not be voted out. This enraged Phillip, who immediately responded and said that Francesca told him to vote for Rob. This angered both Francesca and Kristina, and they decided to change their votes to Phillip, both vehemently denied that they were planning to vote out Rob. Phillip openly voiced that he would be voting for Francesca and announced that Kristina had the Hidden Immunity Idol, shocking everyone else on the tribe and silently infuriating Francesca and Kristina. Kristina admitted that she did have the Idol, but she, along with Francesca, still denied that their plan was to vote out Rob, but instead she would be voting for Natalie, even though she did tell Phillip that she was voting for Rob. Jeff asked Rob whose story he believed. Rob said that, while Phillip was adamant in defending his story, Francesca denied it with equal energy. However, Kristina did not defend herself. Rob asked Kristina to show him the Idol just to confirm that she had it. Upon seeing it, he asked her to give him the Idol, declaring that she would stay in the game if she handed it over and that doing so would show that Kristina was telling the truth, but Kristina said she could not hand it over. When the voting came, the alliance of six kept to their plan and split their votes between Francesca and Kristina. With Phillip's flip to the majority, Francesca was voted out and became the first castaway to go to Redemption Island. After Francesca left for Redemption Island, Jeff said that there would be a flint at Ometepe's campsite.
322	2	"You Own My Vote"	6.2/10	3.1/9	February 23, 2011	10.932	#17
After Ometepe returned to camp from Tribal Council, Phillip felt betrayed by Francesca and swore his loyalty to Rob, while Rob plotted with his alliance to vote out Phillip next. Rob was concerned about the growing connection between Andrea and Matt. Over at Zapatera, Russell added Krista to his alliance with Stephanie. Russell then went on his typical Hidden Immunity Idol hunt, but was beaten to it by Ralph who happened to stumble upon the idol while picking up rocks.: Reward/Immunity Challenge: One at a time, a castaway would swim across a pool, climb up a tower, and then jump off the tower to smash a tile. The smashed tile would release a key which the castaway would retrieve. Once five keys were retrieved, one castaway would use the keys to unlock a box that contained a ball. Two castaways would then toss the ball to break five tiles. The first tribe to break all five tiles would win fishing gear and immunity.; Zapatera came from behind to win their second challenge in a row. After Zapatera had won, Matt shook the hands of several of the Zapatera tribe members, which angered Rob. Russell picked up Zapatera's reward as he knew there would be a clue to the Hidden Immunity Idol within it. He tried to take the clue without anybody noticing, but Ralph did and told the rest of the tribe. Mike and Ralph confronted Russell about the clue, but Russell denied that he had it even though he had already shown it to his alliance. Rob came up with a plan with Ashley, Grant, and Natalie to vote against Matt, but to tell Matt and Andrea that they were splitting the vote between Kristina and Phillip. Rob took Phillip aside and told him that something big was happening at Tribal Council, that he needed to not say anything about the plan at Tribal Council, and that Rob would signal to Phillip whom Rob wanted Phillip to vote for. At Tribal Council, Phillip kept quiet about the plan and voted per Rob's signal against Kristina. Kristina played the Hidden Immunity Idol, negating Phillip and Andrea's votes against her, but Rob's plan came together and Matt was voted out.
323	3	"Keep Hope Alive"	6.3/10	3.3/10	March 2, 2011	11.315	#14
When Matt arrived at Redemption Island, Francesca was shocked to see someone from Rob's alliance. After Ometepe returned from Tribal Council, Rob told Phillip that he was in his alliance with Grant, Ashley and Natalie and that Andrea or Kristina would be voted out next. The next day, the tribes received Tree Mail instructing them to draw marbles to see who would witness the duel on Redemption Island. Zapatera sent over David and Steve, while Ometepe sent over Ashley and Andrea.: Redemption Island Duel: The two castaways would use rope to tie together sticks in order to make a pole to retrieve three keys. The first castaway to retrieve all three keys and unlock three locks would win.; The duel was won by Matt in a come from behind victory, sending Francesca home. Back at Ometepe, Rob talked to Andrea and tried to reassure her that she was still part of his alliance, but Andrea did not believe him and wanted to find a way to mix things up in the future. Over at Zapatera, Russell's alliance could not find the Hidden Immunity Idol, so they decided to feign like they did have one by having Stephanie constantly carry around her bag, giving the impression that an idol was in her purse. David, Mike, Ralph, Sarita, and Steve all agreed to lose the next challenge on purpose in order to vote out Russell. Julie was reluctant about this plan, as she did not want to give any momentum to Ometepe and she thought she could handle Russell.: Reward/Immunity Challenge: Three members from each tribe would be strapped to a large wheel. Three other tribe members would spin the wheel, which would cause one strapped in castaway at a time to be dunked head first into water. While under water, the castaway would take water in the mouth, which they would then spit into a tube. Once the tube was filled, a ball would be released. One tribe member would then solve a slide puzzle. The first tribe to have their puzzle solved would win two chairs, two pillows, tarp, three blankets, a lantern, and immunity.; At the Reward/Immunity Challenge, the group of six went through with deliberately losing the challenge, despite Julie's hesitance. Back at Ometepe, Rob found the clue to the Hidden Immunity Idol hidden within the reward. At Zapatera, the group of six decided to split their votes between Russell and Stephanie. Russell suspected that the six did throw the challenge and, together with Stephanie, tried to get Julie to flip to Russell's alliance and to vote against Ralph. At Tribal Council, the division between the majority and Russell's alliance was discussed. When it came time for the vote, Julie stuck with the majority and the vote was tied 3–3–3 between Ralph, Russell, and Stephanie. On the re-vote, Russell was voted out and was sent to Redemption Island.
324	4	"Don't You Work for Me?"	6.3/10	3.2/9	March 9, 2011	10.960	#14
On day 9, with Krista and Stephanie away from camp, Ralph decided to show the Hidden Immunity Idol to the rest of the Zapatera tribe. On day 10, the tribes were told to select who would witness the next Redemption Island Duel either by mutual agreement or random draw. Ometepe agreed that Kristina and Phillip could go, while Zapatera agreed upon Ralph and Sarita.: Redemption Island Duel: The two castaways would stack wooden blocks like a line of domino tiles while avoiding ropes that would topple the tiles that were already stacked. Once all of the blocks were properly stacked, the castaway would start a chain reaction which would release a ball that would smash a tile. The first castaway to break their tile would win.; The duel was won by Matt for the second time in a row. After the loss, Russell was very emotional, but he regained his composure and let loose on his former tribe by getting Ralph to say that he had a Hidden Immunity Idol and telling Kristina and Phillip that Sarita, Mike, and Steve were in charge of their tribe. While Kristina and Phillip were off at the Redemption Island, Rob came up with a ruse to distract the rest of the tribe so that he could search for the Hidden Immunity Idol. The ruse worked and Rob had the time to successfully find the idol. When Kristina and Phillip returned to camp, Phillip thought he could use Russell's information about Zapatera's alliances and the Hidden Immunity Idol as leverage against Rob and Grant to allow Kristina to remain in the game. However, the ploy failed as Rob and Grant distrusted Phillip even more after his revelation.: Reward/Immunity Challenge: The tribes would send out one tribe member at a time to complete tasks involving tools. At the first station, a crowbar would be used to open a crate that contained a shovel. At the second station, the shovel would be used to dig up a hatchet. At the third station, the hatchet would be used to chop through a log that would release two saws. At the fourth station, two tribe members would use the saws to saw through a wall to make planks. At the fifth station, two tribe members would use the planks to complete a ramp. Finally, the entire tribe would ascend the ramp, one tribe member would untie a hammer and then use it to hammer in three nails that would break three tiles. The first tribe to break all three tiles and place their tools atop the board would win a BBQ set, steak, sausage, bread, vegetables, condiments, and immunity.; At the Reward/Immunity Challenge, Zapatera went on to win their third challenge. Back at Ometepe's camp, Kristina tried to hint that there was a clue to the Hidden Immunity Idol within Ometepe's reward and that Grant and Rob may have already found it. Rob kept the knowledge of the idol from his alliance and got Andrea, Ashley, Grant, and Natalie to think that Kristina might have the idol and to split the vote between Kristina and Phillip, favoring Kristina to be voted out. However, Grant and the girls were leaning towards voting out Phillip as he was getting on their last nerves. When Phillip asked Rob whom he should vote for at Tribal Rob told him Kristina, Phillip thought Rob went back on his word about keeping Kristina in the game and decided that he needed to make a move at Tribal Council to keep himself in the game. At Tribal Council, Kristina and Phillip lobbied for the other to be voted out. When the vote came, Rob's plan held and Kristina was sent to Redemption Island.
325	5	"We Hate Our Tribe"	6.0/10	3.2/10	March 16, 2011	10.727	#13
When Ometepe returned from Tribal Council, Phillip was upset that he was the odd man out in Rob's alliance. Phillip decided to try to make a better connection with the women of his tribe, but only made progress with Andrea.: Redemption Island Duel: The two castaways would race to retrieve puzzle pieces and then assemble them into a cube. The first castaway to assemble the cube would win.; Krista and Stephanie from Zapatera and Grant and Rob from Ometepe witnessed Matt win his third Redemption Island Duel by defeating Kristina. After the Duel, Matt told Grant and Rob that he wanted to go to the final three with them and that he hoped he would rejoin Ometepe. Krista and Stephanie made it clear that they had no loyalties to the Zapatera tribe and they would be willing to join an alliance with Ometepe after the merge.: Reward/Immunity Challenge: One castaway from each tribe would be a caller to navigate their blindfolded tribe members through a maze to collect four bags of puzzle pieces. Once all four bags were collected, the caller would use the pieces to solve a word puzzle. The first caller to solve the puzzle would win for their tribe coffee, tea, creamer, sugar, honey, pastries, donuts, and immunity.; At the Reward/Immunity Challenge, Stephanie was the caller for Zapatera (at Sarita's urging) and Rob was the caller for Ometepe. In a close battle, Rob came through to win the challenge for Ometepe. While enjoying their reward, Grant and Rob noticed a clue to the Hidden Immunity Idol within the jar of coffee and worked together to get the clue and conceal it from the rest of the tribe. Rob took the clue from Grant, but then switched it with the first clue that he had, leaving Grant none the wiser. Back at Zapatera, Sarita argued with the rest of her alliance over her picking Stephanie to be the caller when several of her alliance members thought David would have been better. Going into Tribal Council, the alliance of six knew that they would be voting out either Krista or Stephanie. Krista tried to stir things up between the alliance of six by pointing out sub-alliances within the six, but the alliance did not break and she was sent to Redemption Island.
326	6	"Their Red-Headed Step Child"	6.3/10	3.1/9	March 23, 2011	11.003	#11
On day 14, Steve was surprised that Krista and Stephanie had voted for him at the previous Tribal Council. When Steve asked Stephanie why they voted for him, she said that they voted for the weakest competitor.: Redemption Island Duel: The two castaways would use a grappling hook to retrieve three bags that hold a ball. The castaways would then use one of the balls to work a labyrinth. The first castaway to finish the labyrinth would win.; At Redemption Island, Krista received her luxury item, a Bible, much to the delight of Matt. At the Duel, Matt won his fourth in a row, witnessed by Andrea, Natalie, Julie and Mike. Before Krista departed, she handed over the Bible to Matt, which made Andrea question how much he had bonded with Krista during their time at Redemption Island and speculated that he could be a danger in the future. The next day at Zapatera, Sarita began to irritate her tribe with an issue regarding her tooth. David told Stephanie that in order to remain in the game, she had to try to break up the alliance and get them to vote for Sarita. Stephanie then apologized to Steve after her vote at Tribal Council and that she really wanted to vote for Sarita as she was the weakest tribe member, but he was unsure about her motives. Over at Ometepe, Phillip confronted Ashley and Natalie about what he felt was their lax attitude around the camp. Rob saw the confrontation was a possible fracture among the tribe that would weaken them overall, so he took Phillip aside to attempt to bring peace between the three.: Reward/Immunity Challenge: Two castaways from each tribe would shoot balls from a slingshot while the other members of the tribe tried to catch the balls. For every ball caught, the castaway would score a point for their tribe. The first tribe to score five points would win a trip to a mountain overlooking San Juan del Sur, a picnic lunch, and immunity.; At the Reward/Immunity Challenge, Grant dominated the challenge by scoring four of the points in Ometepe's shutout of Zapatera, despite Mike ripping his shirt off him. While on their reward, Grant and Rob attempted to read the clue to the Hidden Immunity Idol without the others noticing, but were caught by Phillip. Phillip felt betrayed by the two guys for not sharing the clue with him, but decided to keep his anger bottled up until presented with a better opportunity to take revenge. Before Tribal Council, David and Stephanie lobbied hard the rest of the tribe to vote out Sarita instead of Stephanie. At Tribal Council, it was acknowledged that Stephanie was seen as a better competitor, but Sarita was seen as more loyal overall. In the end, David and Stephanie's lobbying did not work and Stephanie was sent to Redemption Island.
327	7	"It Don't Take a Smart One"	6.3/10	3.1/9	March 30, 2011	11.005	#18
When Zapatera returned to camp from Tribal Council, the rift between David and Sarita continued. Over at Ometepe, Phillip no longer trusted Rob because Rob tried to keep the clue to the Hidden Immunity Idol from him and looked for inspiration from The Book of Five Rings to break Rob's control of the tribe.: Redemption Island Duel: The two castaways would compete in a game of concentration. One at a time, the castaways would turn over two tiles from a field of twenty. Should they undercover a pair of matching symbols, they would score one point. The first castaway to score five points would win.; David, Ralph, Rob, and Phillip witnessed Matt's continued domination at Redemption Island when he won his fifth Duel in a row. While Phillip and Rob were returning from Redemption Island, Phillip asked Rob what information they wanted to withhold from the rest of the tribe. Rob said he wanted to tell them everything and then used Phillip's question against him in order to sow distrust of Phillip amongst the rest of the tribe. Rob also told the tribe that he thought Phillip would flip to the other side when the merge happens. Back at Zapatera, Ralph thought David would flip to the other side at the merge.: Reward/Immunity Challenge: The tribes would run an obstacle course of a hay stack, a rope crawl, a rope blocked pathway, a net crawl, and two brick walls. Along the way of the course would be three stations where two balls in a bag is suspended in the air on a metal spring. The tribes would have to work together to reach the ball and free it from the spring. At the end of the course, the tribe would untie the bags and shoot the six balls into a basket. The first tribe to shoot all six balls into the basket would win a ride aboard an Mil Mi-17 to an active volcano and a picnic of fruit, vegetables, cheese, candy, cookies, crackers, alcoholic and non-alcoholic beverages, and immunity.; The Reward/Immunity Challenge was closely fought, with the lead being traded back and forth several times, but Ometepe eventually prevailed. On the reward trip, Rob found the clue to the Hidden Immunity Idol within a jar of cookies and managed to get it without any of the tribe noticing. He then tossed the clue into the volcano. At Tribal Council, Zapatera again had a choice between loyalty and strength in challenges with the vote split between Sarita and David, respectively. The tribe chose strength and Sarita was sent to Redemption Island.
328	8	"This Game Respects Big Moves"	6.3/10	3.2/10	April 6, 2011	10.937	#17
The day 19 treemail arrived announcing the Redemption Island Duel, but unlike previous Duels, the note said that the entire tribe would attend.: Redemption Island Duel: The two castaways would brace themselves with their arms between two walls while standing barefoot on two foot pegs. Every 15 minutes, the castaways would move down to smaller foot pegs. When the castaways reached the third set of foot pegs, they would try to remain on them as long as they could. The last castaway to remain on their pegs would win.; The tribes headed off to the Duel anticipating a merge. Before the Duel started, Jeff announced that the winner of the Duel would re-enter the game. Despite an injured foot, Matt outlasted Sarita in the Duel. After Sarita departed the Redemption Island Arena, Jeff announced that the tribes had merged. After some celebrating by the castaways, Jeff handed the new tribe a map to a new beach and surprised the tribe by announcing that Redemption Island would still be in play. When the tribe arrived at their new beach, the traditional merger feast was awaiting them. Rob proposed naming the tribe Murlonio, which he claimed was Spanish for "from the sea, united", but in reality did not mean anything and was an inside joke between Rob and Amber Mariano named after one of her stuffed animals. Mike saw Matt as the linchpin vote at Tribal Council and approached him about joining the former Zapatera tribe along with Andrea. Mike promised Matt to go to the final four with him, even at the expense of his own tribe and the use of the Hidden Immunity Idol. Matt told Andrea that he wanted to vote out the Ometepe tribe, starting with voting out Steve as a diversion, and then voting out Phillip and Rob. Andrea was unsure if she wanted to flip alliances. The next day, Matt was torn between going through with his plan or to stick with Ometepe.: Immunity Challenge: Each castaway would have to stand on a small wooden log while balancing a ball on a wooden disk. At regular intervals, a ball would be added until the castaway would be balancing three balls. Should any of the balls fall off the disk or if they step off the log, the castaway would be out of the challenge. The last castaway to not drop a ball or step off the log would win immunity.; At the first Individual Immunity Challenge, Natalie took the win over Mike. The former Zapatera tribe plotted to do something Rob would not have thought of by voting out Grant. Matt decided that he would honor his God and instead of flipping to Zapatera, he would stick with Ometepe. Matt told Rob of Mike's final four and Hidden Immunity Idol offer. While the two were talking, Andrea stopped by and Matt told Andrea that he would not be flipping and revealed his plotting with her to vote out Rob. Andrea felt that Matt had thrown her under the bus to Rob. Rob decided that Matt could not be trusted and that he had to be sent back to Redemption Island. Rob rounded up the rest of the Ometepe tribe to plot to vote out Matt. Mike continued to work on getting Matt to flip even so far as writing a note to Matt promising him final three if he voted for Grant. Matt showed the note to Andrea. Rob took Andrea aside to tell her that the vote was going against Matt. Andrea was torn whether to keep Matt or be the deciding vote to eliminate Grant instead, as it would mean betraying 2 of her 3 main allies- Grant and Rob, and she was now unsure after Matt had revealed their prior plans to Rob whether she could trust Matt moving forward, and also unsure what her situation would then become with Matt having already gone back on his idea of them switching to the Zapatera side. She also considered telling Matt about the situation but did not. Before the Tribal Council votes were read, Ralph stepped up and told Jeff that he wanted to play the Hidden Immunity Idol on Mike. However, no votes were cast against Mike. Matt stuck with what he promised to Rob and voted against Steve. Andrea decided to save Grant over Matt, and the rest of Ometepe also voted for Matt, and he was blindsided for the second time in a 6-5-1 vote and sent back to Redemption Island.
329	9	"The Buddy System"	6.6/11	3.1/9	April 13, 2011	11.086	#10
The day after Tribal Council, Ralph asked Ashley if he was next on the chopping block and offered his vote for her at the final Tribal Council over Rob should she make it to the top three. Natalie told Rob about Ralph's offer and how Ashley said that she would not tell Rob about the offer. Rob decided that because of that transgression, Ashley would not make it to the final three. Rob tried to keep his Ometepe tribemates from forging alliances with the Zapatera tribe members, even going so far as having separate living quarters and eating times. The former Ometepe agreed to a "buddy system" where none of them would talk to the former Zapatera about the game at all. Rob also spoke in confessionals of his long terms plans of bringing Phillip and Natalie to the final 3 with him, feeling it was already becoming obvious they would be the two easiest to beat in the end.: Immunity Challenge: The castaways would dig a club out from under the sand. They would then use the club to smash a tile. The first six castaways to smash their tile would move on to the second round. In the second round, the six castaways would dunk their head in a trough of water and collect water in their mouths. They would then crawl under the trough and spit the water into a tube. The first three to fill their tubes would move on to the final round where they would solve a block puzzle. The first castaway to solve their puzzle would win immunity.; At the Immunity Challenge, Grant, Rob, Ralph, Mike, David, and Julie moved on to the second round. Grant, Mike, and David then moved to the final round where Grant solved the puzzle first to take the second Individual Immunity Challenge. While the Ometepe alliance was down the beach, Mike and David noticed that tribe's flag had moved, so they started digging around the pole thinking that there was a Hidden Immunity Idol. The Ometepe alliance noticed the digging and raced back to camp to dig for themselves. Rob was concerned that Zapatera might have found another Hidden Immunity Idol. At Tribal Council, the former Zapatera tried to sow doubt into Phillip's mind that he was the sixth man in the Ometepe alliance, but Phillip did not bite and threw it right back at the Zapatera members. When the vote came, Ometepe decided to send Mike to Redemption Island. When the tribe returned to camp, Rob congratulated Phillip on his stand against Zapatera at Tribal Council and told him that he was not at the bottom of the Ometepe alliance, but at the top of the Ometepe alliance. Ralph approached Phillip and Andrea to talk about the game, but they deflected his attempts.: Immunity Challenge: The castaways would hang from a bar over a pool of water. After twenty minutes, the castaways could only hang upside down with their legs over the bar. The last castaway to hang onto the bar would win immunity.; When the tribe arrived at the Immunity Challenge site, they were greeted with the view of cheeseburgers. Jeff told them that anybody who wanted to eat could do so, but they would be out of the challenge. Steve and Phillip opted out of challenge to eat. The challenge came down to a battle between David and the women of Ometepe. After over 45 minutes, David dropped from the bar. Andrea told Ashley and Natalie that she really wanted this challenge. Ashley and Natalie agreed to drop from the bar, giving Andrea the win. After awarding Andrea the Individual Immunity necklace, Jeff told the tribe that they would meet at Tribal Council to vote out a castaway who would meet both Matt and Mike at Redemption Island. Rob was torn between whether to vote out David or Steve, and the Ometepe alliance discussed multiple options. At Tribal Council, the Ometepe alliance chose David, and despite a bold plea to make his vote count four times, David went to Redemption Island.
330	10	"Rice Wars"	6.3/10	3.1/9	April 20, 2011	11.024	#10
On day 25, Phillip had a premonition while meditating that made him decide that he had come to a "full circle of trust" with Rob. When the Zapatera alliance enjoyed a relatively substantial meal of rice from their provisions, Phillip thought they were trying to eat all of their rice before they get voted out. He decided that the camp's rice was for all and he took several scoops from Zapatera's can of rice.: Redemption Island Duel: The three castaways would use 150 wooden tiles to build a house of cards. The first two castaways to build a tower to a height of 8 feet (2.4 m) would remain in the game.; The entire tribe witnessed the new three-way Redemption Island Duel where Mike and Matt built their towers ahead of David, who became the first member of the jury. On day 26, when Andrea opened Ometepe's can of rice, she discovered that there were maggots in the rice. After the Ometepe alliance sorted out their rice on a blanket, Andrea asked if they could put their rice in the Zapatera alliance's can, but Steve refused. Phillip and Steve had a fierce argument over the matter. Phillip thought Steve was being racist after Steve had called him "crazy", which Phillip equated with the term "nigger".: Immunity Challenge: The castaways would compete to finish a multi-stage puzzle. The castaways would start by running around a post in order to spin off a disk that would be used as a puzzle base. They would then solve a puzzle that would fit within the base. The first six castaways that finish their puzzle would move on to the next round. In the final round, the completed base would be at the center of a second puzzle. The first castaway to finish their second puzzle would win immunity.; At the Immunity Challenge, Rob, Julie, Ralph, Andrea, Steve, and Grant moved on to the final round. In the final round, Rob barely edged out Steve for the win. When the tribe returned to camp, Julie buried Phillip's swim trunks while he was out on a walk. At Tribal Council, the argument between Phillip and Steve was discussed. Phillip thought Steve's tone during the argument had a racist undertone. Steve declared there was no prejudice within him, and that he also played football along with African Americans in his previous years. Jeff then asked who had taken Phillip's swim trunks, to which Julie joyfully fessed to taking them and burying them under a rock. When the votes were cast, Julie was sent to Redemption Island.
331	11	"A Mystery Package"	6.4/10	3.2/9	April 27, 2011	11.324	#9
When the tribe returned to camp, Steve attempted to bury the hatchet with Phillip regarding their argument, but Phillip thought the apology was self-serving and not entirely genuine. Phillip had another premonition from his great-great-grandfather that he would find the shorts that Julie buried and after looking, he did indeed find them.: Redemption Island Duel: The three castaways would play a variation of shuffleboard. The castaways would be given three pucks which they would slide across a board and past various obstacles. The first two castaways to have all three of their pucks come to rest touching the end zone would remain in the game.; Over on Redemption Island, Matt was struggling with remaining focused on the game, but his faith pulled him through to a victory along with Mike in the second three-way Redemption Island Duel. Grant suggested to Rob that Andrea be the first of the Ometepe alliance to be voted out as he was concerned that she had some sympathy for voting out Matt.: Reward/Immunity Challenge: The castaways would compete in a logrolling contest. The castaways would match up against another tribe member. The castaway who stays on the log the longest would advance to the next round. In the next round, the remaining four would again compete head-to-head in a single elimination. In the final, the last castaway standing on the log would win chocolate cake and milk and immunity.; After Jeff described the Reward/Immunity Challenge, he held up a wrapped package and announced that there would be a twist after the challenge. In the first round of the challenge, Grant defeated Rob, Ashley defeated Andrea, Ralph defeated Steve, and Phillip defeated Natalie. In the second round, Grant defeated Ashley and Ralph defeated Phillip. Grant won the last round to take his second Individual Immunity. Jeff then said that Grant could choose two people to share his reward and he selected Rob and Andrea. Grant wanted Andrea to feel secure in the final 3 promise she thought she had with Rob and Grant, and be unaware of her lower position in the Ometepe alliance. Jeff gave the wrapped package to the tribe, told them not to unwrap it and to bring it to the night's Tribal Council. The castaways speculated about the wrapped package, thinking it was a set of cards and that they might have to vote out a second person at the upcoming Tribal Council. Rob decided that Ralph would be voted out next at Tribal Council because he was still a threat in the game while he thought Steve had already given up. Rob informed Ashley and Natalie about his and Grant's concerns about Andrea's loyalties and the two girls agreed to vote for Andrea should they have to vote out two people at Tribal Council. Steve approached Ashley and Natalie about having the three girls of the Ometepe alliance blindside Rob, but Ashley and Natalie declined because they wanted Andrea out of the game. When the two girls told Rob about Steve's offer, Rob reassessed Steve's desire to stay in the game and considered voting out Steve ahead of Andrea. At Tribal Council, Steve made one last play to the girls to blindside Rob, but when the vote came, the girls did not flip and Ralph was sent to Redemption Island.: Immunity Challenge: The castaways would test their memory by having to memorize a series of symbols shown by Jeff. The castaways would have to show back the symbols in order. If they showed the wrong symbol, they would be out of the challenge. The last castaway to show all of the correct symbols would win immunity.; As soon as Ralph departed Tribal Council, Jeff announced that the tribe could unwrap the mystery package. The package contained a set of cards that announced that the tribe would immediately compete in an Immunity Challenge and then vote out a member of the tribe. Rob outlasted Ashley and Steve to win Individual Immunity. The castaways then went straight to the vote where they sent Steve to Redemption Island.
332	12	"You Mangled My Nets"	6.4/10	3.1/9	May 4, 2011	10.990	#13
Reward Challenge/Redemption Island Duel: Competing in rounds, the four castaways would throw a metal ball in an attempt to break four tiles. The first three castaways to break all four tiles would remain in the game. The first castaway to win would receive a visit from their loved one.; Day 31's tree mail brought a Sprint Samsung Epic 4G announcing the next Redemption Island Duel and video messages from the castaway's loved ones. The four on Redemption Island also received a similar phone announcing the duel and video messages from their loved ones. When the castaways arrived at the Redemption Island Duel, Jeff took the phones back and then announced that the first winner of the Duel would get to spend time with their loved one in person. Mike was the first person to win at the duel and won a visit from his mother, Jane. Matt and Ralph finished the duel in second and third place to continue in the game. When Mike's mother arrived at the Redemption Island Arena, Jeff gave Mike three choices: he could take the visit from his mother, he could opt to forgo the visit with his mother and instead give Matt's brother, Burton and Ralph's friend, Ronnie for a visit, or he could forgo the visit with his mother and give the Ometepe Six a visit from their loved ones. All of the loved ones entered the Redemption Island Arena while Mike made his decision. Mike took inspiration from the Bible to give the most good to the most people and chose to give visits to the Ometepe Six (Andrea's dad, Royal; Ashley's mom, Teri; Grant's brother-in-law, Steve; Natalie's mom, Tracie; Phillip's sister, Tracy; and Rob's sister, Heather). The Ometepe Six then headed back to camp to spend the afternoon with their loved ones. Back at the Redemption Island campsite, Ralph was upset at Mike's decision while Matt said he couldn't have made the same decision but also admired Mike for being able to. Mike claimed that the decision was not strategic, but just the right thing to do. Jeff though openly questioned if Mike's decision was to increase his chances of winning jury votes, especially from the Ometepe side, should he reach the end.: Immunity Challenge: The castaways would have to race to assemble eighteen puzzle steps in a staircase. The castaways could only carry one puzzle step at a time up the staircase and had to place the steps in order from bottom to top. The first castaway to correctly place all eighteen steps and reach the top of the staircase would win immunity.; On day 32, Rob won the exhausting Immunity Challenge to win his second Individual Immunity in a row. The tribe decided to blindside Andrea at Tribal Council. Before Tribal Council, Phillip complained about a tangled fishing net. He also tore down part of the roof of the Zapatera part of the shelter and threw it in the fire. He did this to reinforce his strategy of playing the villain/annoyance-of-the-tribe in order to be seen as being somebody easy to defeat at the Final Tribal Council. Rob and Grant wavered voting out Andrea or Phillip. In the end, the tribe stuck to the original plan of voting for Andrea and she was sent to Redemption Island.
333	13	"Too Close For Comfort"	6.3/10	3.1/9	May 11, 2011	10.771	#18
When the castaways returned from Tribal Council, Ashley thought she had a strong alliance with Natalie, but Natalie was leaning more towards her alliance with Rob. Rob told Natalie to keep up appearances with Ashley and thought about voting out Ashley next.: Redemption Island Duel: The four castaways would navigate a handle across a table maze. Once clear of the maze, the handle would be used to smash open a box that contained a bag of puzzle pieces. The first three castaways to solve the word puzzle would remain in the game.; Over at Redemption Island, Andrea and Matt argued over Andrea's blindside of Matt. Matt argued Andrea had betrayed him again which was a slap in the face given how close they had become, while Andrea argued she had been willing to work with Matt even over Rob, until he had betrayed her trust when he revealed to Rob how she and he had considered flipping sides to the Zaps with Matt, and unnecessarily doing so even after Matt changed those plans. She also blamed Matt's stupidity as causing Rob's distrust in her, and for her position at the bottom of her Ometepe alliance. On day 33, the Redemption Island Duel was held with Mike, Matt, and Andrea finishing the puzzle ahead of Ralph after he blew a huge lead from the maze stage when he struggled with the word puzzle. The next day, Rob and Grant discussed voting out Ashley. Meanwhile, Phillip and the girls argued over food. Rob was upset Phillip was drawing the girls closer when he wanted to pull them apart. Rob reassured Natalie that he would take her to the end. Back at camp Ashley started to worry about her position in the game, telling Natalie she thought Rob would vote one of them off at the end to make sure Grant was in the final 3. Ashley thought about making a big game move and approached Rob about voting off Grant. She argued to Rob that neither she or Rob could beat Grant in a jury vote, and that with Mike or Matt expected to be the one to return from Redemption Island, having 2 off Grant, Mike, Matt around would leave the others no chance to win any remaining immunity challenges. Rob told Ashley he would consider it, but then told Grant about Ashley's proposal and they agreed to vote out Ashley next.: Reward/Immunity Challenge: With one arm tied behind their backs, the castaways would work to solve a three section puzzle in the shape of a fish skeleton. The castaways would link together fish hooks to retrieve a bag of puzzle pieces that would complete one of the three sections. After one section is complete, the castaways would retrieve another bag of puzzle pieces until all three sections were complete. The first castaway to solve the entire puzzle would win a three course meal delivered at camp and immunity.; However, their plan was left in tatters when Ashley won the combined Reward/Immunity Challenge. Rob now the choice of voting off Natalie or Grant and despite the threat of an all girls alliance of Natalie and Ashley, Rob decided that Grant was the bigger threat and voted him off.
334	14	"Seems Like a No Brainer"	7.1/11	4.0/10	May 15, 2011	13.303	#8
Redemption Island Duel: The four castaways would put one foot on one end of a seesaw with the other end having a ceramic vase balanced on it. The castaways would attempt to keep the vase balanced on the end with their foot still on the seesaw. The last castaway to have their vase balanced on the end of the seesaw would win.; Day 36 saw the final Redemption Island Duel. The castaways lasted 40 minutes before Grant's vase tipped over and he became the fifth jury member. After the one-hour mark, Matt's vase tipped off the board and he became the sixth jury member after surviving ten duels and 29 days on Redemption Island. The Duel came down to Andrea and Mike, with Mike being unable to keep his vase balanced, allowing Andrea to win and re-enter the game. When Andrea returned to camp, she started to scramble to remain in the game by making up a story to Ashley and Natalie that Ralph, Matt, and Mike said they would vote for Phillip at the final Tribal Council, which was a complete lie but seemed to have the girls worried. Ashley thought Andrea might join her and Natalie in voting out Phillip or Rob.: Immunity Challenge: The castaways would race along a balance beam to collect a series of bags containing 100 numbered tiles. The first castaway to place their tiles on a board in order from one to one hundred would win immunity.; At the Immunity Challenge, Ashley edged out Andrea and Rob to win. When the castaways returned to camp, Rob overtly took Ashley, Natalie, and Phillip aside to tell them that Andrea had to be voted off. In a private confessional he said voting out Andrea instead of Phillip or Natalie (or himself) was a no brainer from his perspective, as she had worked hard around camp, performed admirably in challenges, and had strong connections and had made no enemies on the jury. Ashley asked Natalie about Rob's plan for the subsequent vote to make sure that the next to go after Andrea would be Phillip. Natalie was concerned about Rob keeping Phillip, but promised to Ashley that her next vote would go against Phillip. Phillip openly reported on the girl's discussions, but then took off for a private conversation with Rob. While the guys were gone, Andrea again lobbied the two other girls in voting out Rob. At Tribal Council, Andrea again lobbied the girls to take control of the game. Rob though pointed out to the others that Andrea was also a huge threat, and proved it again today, and too well liked by jury members to want to take to the end. Andrea then countered by saying the jury were not made up of dummies, and Rob would be an easy choice to win should he be allowed to reach the end, as he had controlled things, while Natalie and Ashley had just followed Rob's orders. Before the votes were read, Rob pulled out the Hidden Immunity Idol and played it. However, the Idol was not needed as Ashley and Natalie stayed loyal to Rob and voted out Andrea. At the Reunion show Natalie and Ashley claimed to have known about the Idol, and with this being the last time it could be played, knowing Rob almost certainly was playing it, so possibly voting him out instead of Andrea would have been pointless.: Immunity Challenge: The castaways would race through a maze to collect four bags of puzzle pieces at four different stations. Once all four bags were collected, the castaways would race to the top of a pyramid and assemble a word puzzle. The first castaway to correctly solve the puzzle would win immunity.; When the castaways returned to camp after Tribal Council, Rob promised the girls that they would go to the final three together. At the Immunity Challenge, Ashley and Rob finished the maze stage, but were stumped by the difficult puzzle. In the end, Rob figured out the puzzle spelled out "Only You Are Safe" to win the final Individual Immunity; guaranteeing him a spot in the final Tribal Council. After the challenge, Rob again told the girls that they were safe and to not tell Phillip about their plans. Ashley asked Natalie to tell her if Rob were to change his plans and Natalie promised that she would. Rob told Phillip that Ashley was going home. Rob took Natalie aside try to convince her to vote against Ashley by pointing out that Ashley may have made a connection with the former Zapatera members on the jury and that she was a threat. Ashley again asked Natalie if Rob had said anything about voting against her, but Natalie lied and said that nothing was going on. At Tribal Council, Natalie found herself in a similar predicament Rob had been in with Grant and Natalie last Tribal Council, torn between her friendship with Ashley and her loyalty to Rob. Ashley made the mistake when probed by Jeff by openly stating she had a much better chance of winning the game than either Natalie or Phillip, and could actually beat Rob, but felt she should be taken to the finals anyway due to her game long loyalty. In the end, Natalie sided with Rob by voting for her instead of Phillip to avoid a tie and fire-making challenge, and Ashley became the final member of the jury. At the final Tribal Council, Philip and Natalie both emphasized their loyalty to Rob, with Phillip going so far as to tell the jury that Rob was the mastermind of their entire plan, while he implemented it. The jury was critical of Natalie for her dependence on Rob and her blindside vote for Ashley. Several jury members emphasized their lack of respect for Phillip, who repeatedly grew hostile and confrontational. Rob was both criticized and praised for his aggressive, dominant gameplay and strategy.
335	15	"Reunion"	5.9/9	3.5/8	May 15, 2011	10.950	#16
Nearly a year later, the jurors' votes were counted. Rob was awarded the title of Sole Survivor by a vote of 8–1–0. Ralph cast the lone vote for Phillip, while Natalie received no votes. The castaways discuss the season with host Jeff Probst.

== Voting history ==
	Original tribes								Merged tribe									
Episode	1	2	3		4	5	6	7	8	9		10	11		12	13	14	
Day	3	5	8		11	13	16	18	21	22	24	27	30		32	35	37	38
Tribe	Ometepe	Ometepe	Zapatera		Ometepe	Zapatera	Zapatera	Zapatera	Murlonio	Murlonio	Murlonio	Murlonio	Murlonio		Murlonio	Murlonio	Murlonio	Murlonio
Eliminated	Francesca	Matt	Tie (Note: The first round of voting resulted in a tie. Per the rules, a second vote was held where the castaways involved in the tie would not vote and the remaining castaways could only vote for those who tied.)	Russell	Kristina	Krista	Stephanie	Sarita	Matt	Mike	David	Julie	Ralph	Steve	Andrea	Grant	Andrea	Ashley
Votes	4–3–2	4–2–0 (Note: Kristina played a hidden immunity idol, therefore the two votes cast against her did not count.)	3–3–3	5–1–0	4–3	6–2	5–2	4–2	6–5–1	6–5	6–4	6–3	6–2	6–1	5–1	4–1	4–0 (Note: Rob played a hidden immunity idol, therefore the vote cast against him did not count.)	3–1
Voter	Vote																	
Rob	Francesca	Matt			Phillip				Matt	Mike	David	Julie	Ralph	Steve	Andrea	Grant	Andrea	Ashley
Phillip	Francesca	~~Kristina~~			Kristina				Matt	Mike	David	Julie	Ralph	Steve	Andrea	Grant	Andrea	Ashley
Natalie	Kristina	Matt			Kristina				Matt	Mike	David	Julie	Ralph	Steve	Andrea	Grant	Andrea	Ashley
Ashley	Kristina	Matt			Kristina				Matt	Mike	David	Julie	Ralph	Steve	Andrea	Grant	Andrea	Phillip
Andrea	Kristina	~~Kristina~~			Kristina				Matt	Mike	David	Julie	Ralph	Steve	Phillip		~~Rob~~	
Grant	Francesca	Matt			Phillip				Matt	Mike	David	Julie	Ralph	Steve	Andrea	Natalie		
Steve			Russell	Russell		Krista	Stephanie	Sarita	Grant	Phillip	Rob	Phillip	Rob	Grant				
Ralph			Russell	None (Note: This player was not eligible to vote in the second round of voting.)		Krista	Stephanie	David	Grant	Phillip	Rob	Phillip	Rob					
Julie			Stephanie	Russell		Krista	Stephanie	Sarita	Grant	Phillip	Rob	Phillip						
David			Stephanie	Russell		Krista	Sarita	Sarita	Grant	Phillip	Rob							
Mike			Russell	Russell		Krista	Stephanie	Sarita	Grant	Phillip								
Matt	Francesca	Phillip							Steve									
Sarita			Stephanie	Russell		Krista	Stephanie	David										
Stephanie			Ralph	None		Steve	Sarita											
Krista			Ralph	Ralph		Steve												
Kristina	Phillip	Phillip			Phillip													
Russell			Ralph	None														
Francesca	Phillip																	

Jury vote
Episode	15		
Day	39		
Finalist	Rob	Phillip	Natalie
Votes	8–1–0		
Juror	Vote		
Ashley	Yes		
Andrea	Yes		
Mike	Yes		
Matt	Yes		
Grant	Yes		
Ralph		Yes	
Steve	Yes		
Julie	Yes		
David	Yes		

== Production ==
=== Filming ===
This season introduced "Redemption Island" to the American version of Survivor, based in part on concepts already used in foreign versions of the show, including "Moondram Ulagam" (3rd Island) in the Tamil version, "The Island of the Dead" in the Israeli version, "Isla Purgatoryo" (Purgatory Island) in the Philippine version's second season, "Ghost Island" in the Serbian version's second season, and the duels in the 2002 Swedish edition.

Instead of being out of the game immediately upon being voted out of their tribe, the voted off contestant would be taken to a secluded area known as Redemption Island. Once there, they were to sustain themselves in the same manner as when living with the tribe: living on limited food, water and shelter. They would be joined by the next person voted out, and those two people would face off in a duel in an arena constructed to resemble an old ruined temple, joined by two representatives from each tribe acting as observers. The winner remains in the game, and continues living at Redemption Island. The loser exits the game for good, throwing their buff into a small fire pit on their way out of the arena. At two predetermined points during the game, at the merge and with four players remaining in the game proper, the winner of the Redemption Island duel returns to the game.

Host Jeff Probst compared Redemption Island to the Pearl Islands' Outcast tribe, stating that the latter concept did not seem to work well with the audience because the Outcast twist was not revealed to the players ahead of time, and was considered unfair to the remaining players in the game. However, the Outcast tribe survived on the same meager rations as everybody else in the game. With Redemption Island, the players were told at the start of the game of the existence and rules of Redemption Island, and Probst expected that this would affect how the tribes would vote out members. Probst also stated that the change would allow for the newer players to have a chance to recover from early mistakes such as choosing the wrong alliance or making a poor vote at Tribal Council. Entertainment Weekly's Dalton Ross correctly speculated that due to the Redemption Island duel as part of each episode, all regular challenges in the show were combined Reward/Immunity challenges until the tribes merged. The duels used at Redemption Island were scaled-back versions of previous challenges the show had used, and Probst stated that this was because these challenges "worked well" and eliminated any risk of the challenges going astray. The idea for allowing other players to watch the duel was a last-minute addition made by Mark Burnett. According to Probst, it gave those that attended the duel "valuable information" they could have used in their gameplay strategy, but also could have left them vulnerable to alliance shifts that might have occurred while they were absent from the tribe.

== Reception ==
The season was universally panned by critics. The primary criticisms are that Redemption Island itself ruined the drama and significance of the elimination, that the cast as a whole was boring and unlikable, and that once Russell Hantz was eliminated, the competition became unfairly favorable to Rob Mariano. Survivor columnist of Entertainment Weekly Dalton Ross ranked it as the 10th-worst season, stating that "the fuse blew out" after the first three episodes, and also that "Most of the vote-offs were clearly telegraphed and the Redemption Island twist sucked the life out of the signature moment - the vote-off." Survivor: Tocantins runner-up and People's Survivor columnist Stephen Fishbach stated that he thought it was the worst season ever. In 2013, Andrea Reiher of Zap2it ranked it as the worst season of Survivor, saying "this season continually felt like one big 'let's win Boston Rob the Survivor title' game orchestrated by the producers for three months," and also criticized the Ometepe tribe as "a tribe full of gomers who were too star-struck to act against [Rob]," which "became more and more boring." In 2014, Joe Reid of The Wire ranked Redemption Island as the worst season of the series, similarly noting that "The coronation of Boston Rob was a foregone conclusion from the earliest stages...The whole season had an air of uselessness around it, and we'd have all been better off if CBS had just aired a 30-minute special where Les Moonves wrote Mariano a check." Reid also described the entire new cast as being "full of lemmings and idiots." Since 2012, Survivor fan site "Survivor Oz" has consistently ranked Redemption Island as the worst season ever in its annual polls ranking every season of the series. It was also ranked as the worst season of all time in 2015 on former Survivor contestant and reality TV podcast host Rob Cesternino's website, both by Cesternino himself and by the fan poll. This was updated in 2021 during Rob's Survivor All-Time Top 40 Rankings podcast where the listeners ranked it 39th out of 40 seasons. Fellow Survivor fan site "The Purple Rock Podcast" ranked Redemption Island as the sixth-worst season in 2020, describing it as "generally boring and predictable television." Inside Survivor ranked this season last out of the first 40 seasons citing the Redemption Island twist and Mariano's "vice grip on the game". In 2024, Nick Caruso of TVLine ranked this season 44th out of 47. Despite the negative reception of the season, the gameplay of Mariano was still well-received by fans. Mariano placed 4th out of the first 34 winners in a fan poll conducted by Entertainment Weekly in 2017. In the official CBS Watch issue commemorating Survivor's 15th anniversary, Mariano was voted by viewers as the greatest contestant in the history of the series.
