= Steve Wright (American football, born 1959) =

American football player (born 1959)

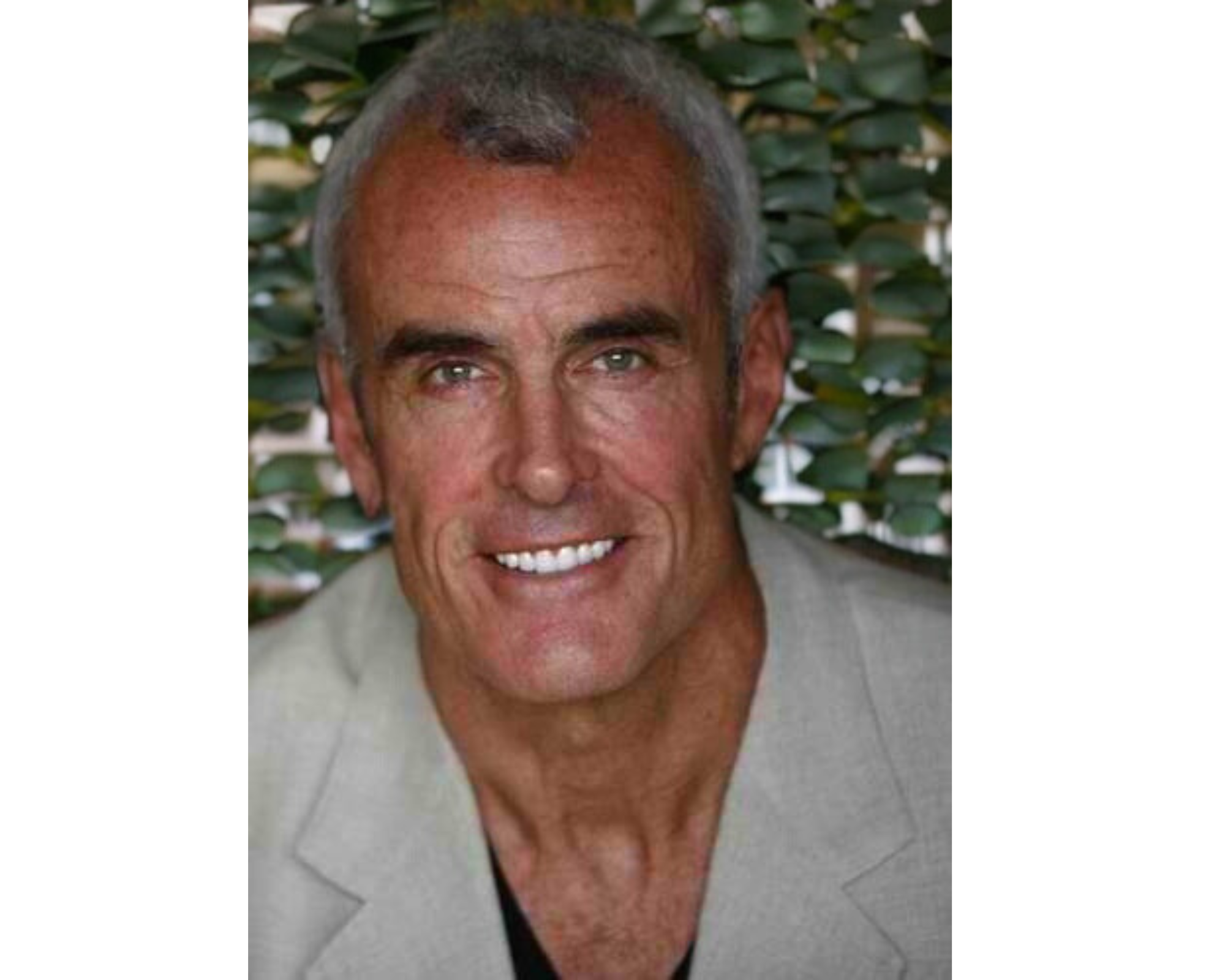
- Steve Wright

No. 73, 70, 66
- Position: Offensive tackle

Personal information
- Born: April 8, 1959 (age 67); St. Louis, Missouri, U.S.
- Listed height: 6 ft 6 in (1.98 m)
- Listed weight: 285 lb (129 kg)

Career information
- High school: Plymouth (MN) Wayzata
- College: Northern Iowa
- NFL draft: 1981: undrafted

Career history
- Dallas Cowboys (1981–1982); Baltimore/Indianapolis Colts (1983–1984); Oakland Invaders (1985); Los Angeles Raiders (1987–1993)

Career NFL statistics
- Games played: 129
- Games started: 67
- Fumble recoveries: 2
- Stats at Pro Football Reference

Stephen Hough Wright (born April 8, 1959) is an American former professional football player who was an offensive tackle in the National Football League (NFL) for the Dallas Cowboys, Indianapolis Colts and Los Angeles Raiders. He was also a member of the Oakland Invaders of the United States Football League (USFL). He played college football for the Northern Iowa Panthers and then played eleven professional seasons with four teams from 1981 to 1992. He also appeared on Survivor: Redemption Island where he placed tenth and became the third jury member.

== Early life ==
Wright attended Wayzata High School, where he played football, basketball, track, and hockey. He was an All-American in the shot put and discus throw.

He accepted a football scholarship from the University of Northern Iowa. He played offensive tackle during his first three years. As a senior he was switched to tight end, registering 8 receptions for 73 yards and one touchdown.

In 1997, he was inducted into the Northern Iowa Athletics Hall of Fame.

== Professional career ==
=== Dallas Cowboys ===
Wright was signed as an undrafted free agent by the Dallas Cowboys after the 1981 NFL draft. He appeared in 16 games, playing mainly on special teams and as a backup offensive tackle.

In 1982, he was moved to the backup guard position. Because of an injury to Kurt Petersen, he was the right guard in the offensive line that blocked on Tony Dorsett's record 99-yard touchdown run against the Minnesota Vikings. Also while with the Cowboys, Wright additionally blocked for another future Survivor contestant, Gary Hogeboom (Survivor: Guatemala), who was the team's backup quarterback.

=== Baltimore/Indianapolis Colts ===
On August 26, 1983, he was traded to the Baltimore Colts in exchange for a sixth round draft choice (#144-Kurt Ploeger). In his first year with the Baltimore Colts he started ten games at right guard. He missed 3 games with an ankle injury. In 1984, when the team moved to Indianapolis, he replaced an injured Chris Hinton at left tackle and started nine games.

=== Oakland Invaders ===
In December 1984, he signed with the Michigan Panthers of the United States Football League. Before the start of the next season, the Panthers merged with the Oakland Invaders. The team would reach the USFL Championship Game, losing to the Baltimore Stars. Wright, who wore #70 with the Invaders, scored a touchdown in a May game against the Denver Gold when Invaders quarterback Bobby Hebert completed a two-yard pass to Wright, who was tackle eligible on the play.

=== Los Angeles Raiders ===
In 1987, he signed with the Los Angeles Raiders. After the players went on a strike on the third week of the season, those games were canceled (reducing the 16 game season to 15) and the NFL decided that the games would be played with replacement players. Wright was part of the Raiders replacement team, that was given the mock name "Masqueraiders" by the media. He ended up playing well in those games as the starter at right tackle and was kept for the rest of the season playing mainly as a backup.

In 1990, he became a full-time starter at right tackle after replacing an injured Bruce Wilkerson and keeping his job after Wilkerson returned and was moved to left tackle.

In 1991 was awarded the Ed Block Courage Award. 1992, he missed nine games with a right shoulder injury. On August, 23, 1993, he was placed on the injured reserve list. He retired from professional football in June 1994 at the age of 35.

== Personal life ==
In August, 2010, Wright appeared as a contestant on the 22nd season of the American competitive reality television series Survivor. On Day 30, he was the 13th person voted out of the main game and was sent to Redemption Island. He was eliminated on Day 31. He's best remembered for his disagreements with Phillip Sheppard, where Phillip claimed their rivalry was racially motivated which he retracted on the Final Reunion show.

Steve Wright's award-winning memoir, Aggressively Human, released in November 2023. The book was written by his wife, author Lizzy Wright.
