= Survivor: Caramoan =

- Season 26
- Region 1 DVD cover
- Presented by: Jeff Probst
- No. of days: 39
- No. of castaways: 20
- Winner: John Cochran
- Runners-up: Dawn Meehan; Sherri Biethman
- Location: Caramoan, Philippines
- Sprint Player of the Season: Malcolm Freberg
- No. of episodes: 15

Release
- Original network: CBS
- Original release: February 13 – May 12, 2013

Additional information
- Filming dates: May 21 – June 28, 2012

Season chronology
- ← Previous; Philippines Next → Blood vs. Water

Survivor: Caramoan — Fans vs. Favorites (commonly referred to as Survivor: Caramoan) is the 26th season of the American CBS competitive reality television series Survivor. The season filmed from May 21 to June 28, 2012, and premiered on February 13, 2013, with a special 90-minute episode.

John Cochran was named the Sole Survivor in the season finale on May 12, 2013, defeating Dawn Meehan and Sherri Biethman in a unanimous 8–0–0 vote. Cochran became the second Jewish winner after Ethan Zohn from Survivor: Africa. Malcolm Freberg won $100,000 as the "Sprint Player of the Season", receiving 36% of votes cast over Brenda Lowe, who received 35%.

== Format ==
Survivor is a reality television show based on the Swedish show Expedition Robinson, created by Mark Burnett and Charlie Parsons. The series follows a number of participants isolated in a remote location, where they must provide food, fire, and shelter. One participant is removed from the series by majority vote every three days, with challenges held to give a reward (ranging from living- and food-related prizes to a car) and immunity from being voted out of the series. The last remaining player receives a prize of $1,000,000.

== Contestants ==
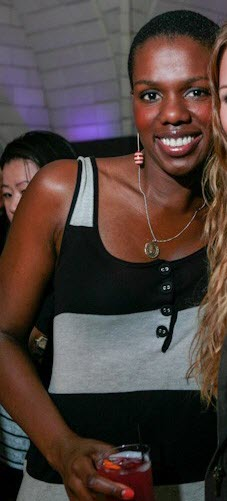
Francesca Hogi

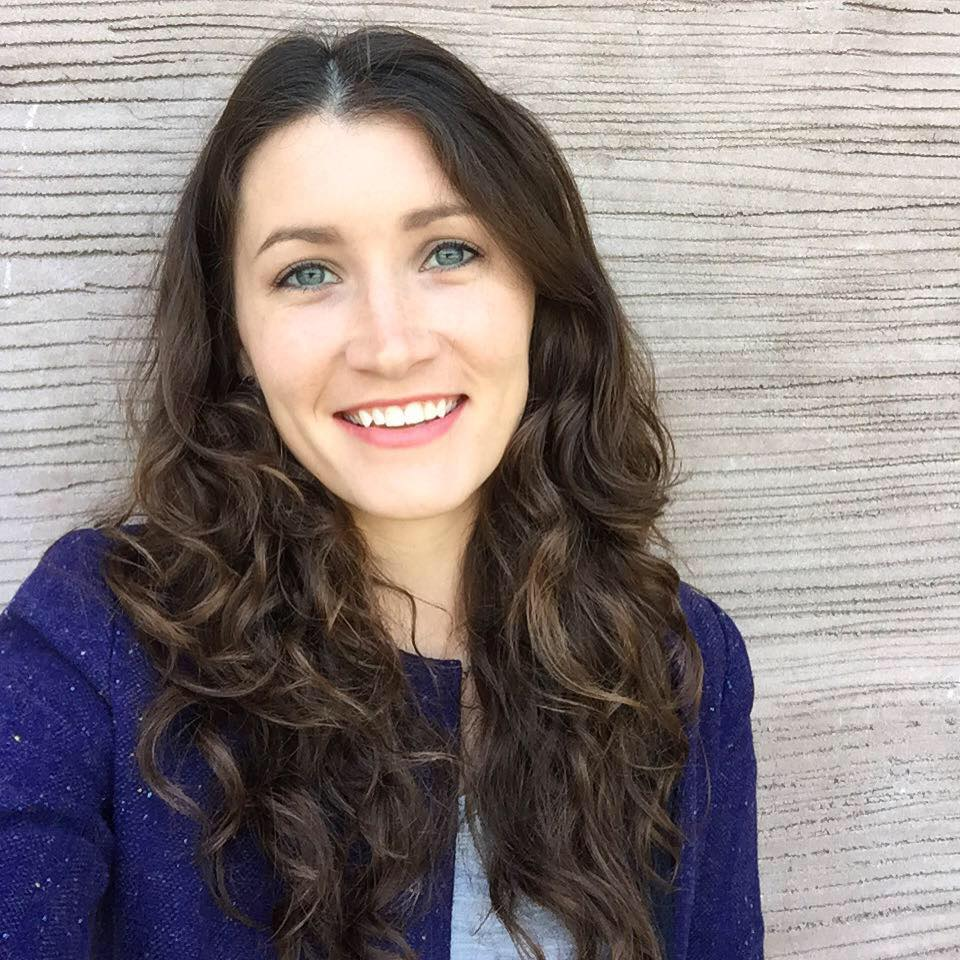
Julia Landauer

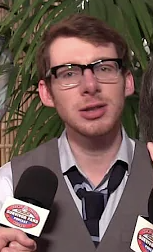
John Cochran

The contestants included 10 new players, the "Fans", and 10 former players, the "Favorites", from six previous seasons returning for their second chance at the game. The Favorites include Erik Reichenbach, a "Fan" from the original "Fans vs. Favorites" season, Survivor: Micronesia. Notable "Fan" contestants from this season include future professional stock car racing driver Julia Landauer; and former Miss Missouri USA Hope Driskill, who placed in the top 16 at Miss USA 2011.

Similar to Russell Hantz during Survivor: Heroes vs. Villains, the Favorites did not have an opportunity to see Malcolm's game-play in Survivor: Philippines, due to Philippines and this season being filmed back to back. The two premerge tribes were "Bikal" and "Gota" (or more accurately "Gata" for the barangay or barrio), named after two of the barangays or barrios (villages, districts, or wards) in the town or municipality of Caramoan, which the latter includes the Caramoan Islands, or named after the Gota Village Resort and/or Gota Beach, in the case of "Gota" instead of "Gata". The merged tribe was known as "Enil Edam", which contestant Malcolm Freberg named after his mother ("Enil Edam" is the name Madeline spelled backwards).

List of Survivor: Caramoan - Fans vs. Favorites contestants
Contestant	Age	From	Tribe			Finish	
Contestant	Age	From	Original	Switched	Merged	Placement	Day
Francesca Hogi Redemption Island	38	Brooklyn, New York	Bikal			1st voted out	Day 3
Allie Pohevitz	25	Oceanside, New York	Gota			2nd voted out	Day 5
Hope Driskill	23	Jefferson City, Missouri	Gota			3rd voted out	Day 7
Shamar Thomas	27	Brooklyn, New York	Gota			Medically evacuated	Day 10
Laura Alexander	23	Washington, D.C.	Gota			4th voted out	Day 10
Brandon Hantz South Pacific	21	Katy, Texas	Bikal			5th voted out	Day 13
Matt Bischoff	38	Cincinnati, Ohio	Gota	Bikal		6th voted out	Day 16
Julia Landauer	21	Stanford, California	Gota	Bikal		7th voted out	Day 19
Corinne Kaplan Gabon	33	Los Angeles, California	Bikal	Bikal	Enil Edam	8th voted out	Day 22
Michael Snow	44	New York City, New York	Gota	Bikal	Enil Edam	9th voted out 1st jury member	Day 25
Phillip Sheppard Redemption Island	54	Santa Monica, California	Bikal	Bikal	Enil Edam	10th voted out 2nd jury member	Day 28
Malcolm Freberg Philippines	26	Odessa, New York	Bikal	Gota	Enil Edam	11th voted out 3rd jury member	Day 30
Reynold Toepfer	30	San Francisco, California	Gota	Gota	Enil Edam	12th voted out 4th jury member	Day 31
Andrea Boehlke Redemption Island	23	New York City, New York	Bikal	Gota	Enil Edam	13th voted out 5th jury member	Day 33
Brenda Lowe Nicaragua	29	Miami, Florida	Bikal	Gota	Enil Edam	14th voted out 6th jury member	Day 36
Erik Reichenbach Micronesia	27	Santa Clarita, California	Bikal	Gota	Enil Edam	Medically evacuated 7th jury member	Day 36
Eddie Fox	23	East Brunswick, New Jersey	Gota	Gota	Enil Edam	15th voted out 8th jury member	Day 38
Sherri Biethman	41	Boise, Idaho	Gota	Gota	Enil Edam	Co-runners-up	Day 39
Dawn Meehan South Pacific	42	South Jordan, Utah	Bikal	Bikal	Enil Edam	Co-runners-up	Day 39
John Cochran South Pacific	25	Washington, D.C.	Bikal	Bikal	Enil Edam	Sole Survivor	Day 39

=== Future appearances ===
Andrea Boehlke and Malcolm Freberg returned as contestants for their third season in Survivor: Game Changers. John Cochran also made a special appearance in that season's fifth episode, where he gave advice to a contestant who was exiled.

Outside of Survivor, Corinne Kaplan competed in The Amazing Race 31 with two-time Survivor castaway Eliza Orlins. Freberg competed on the 2022 USA Network reality competition series, Snake in the Grass.

== Season summary ==
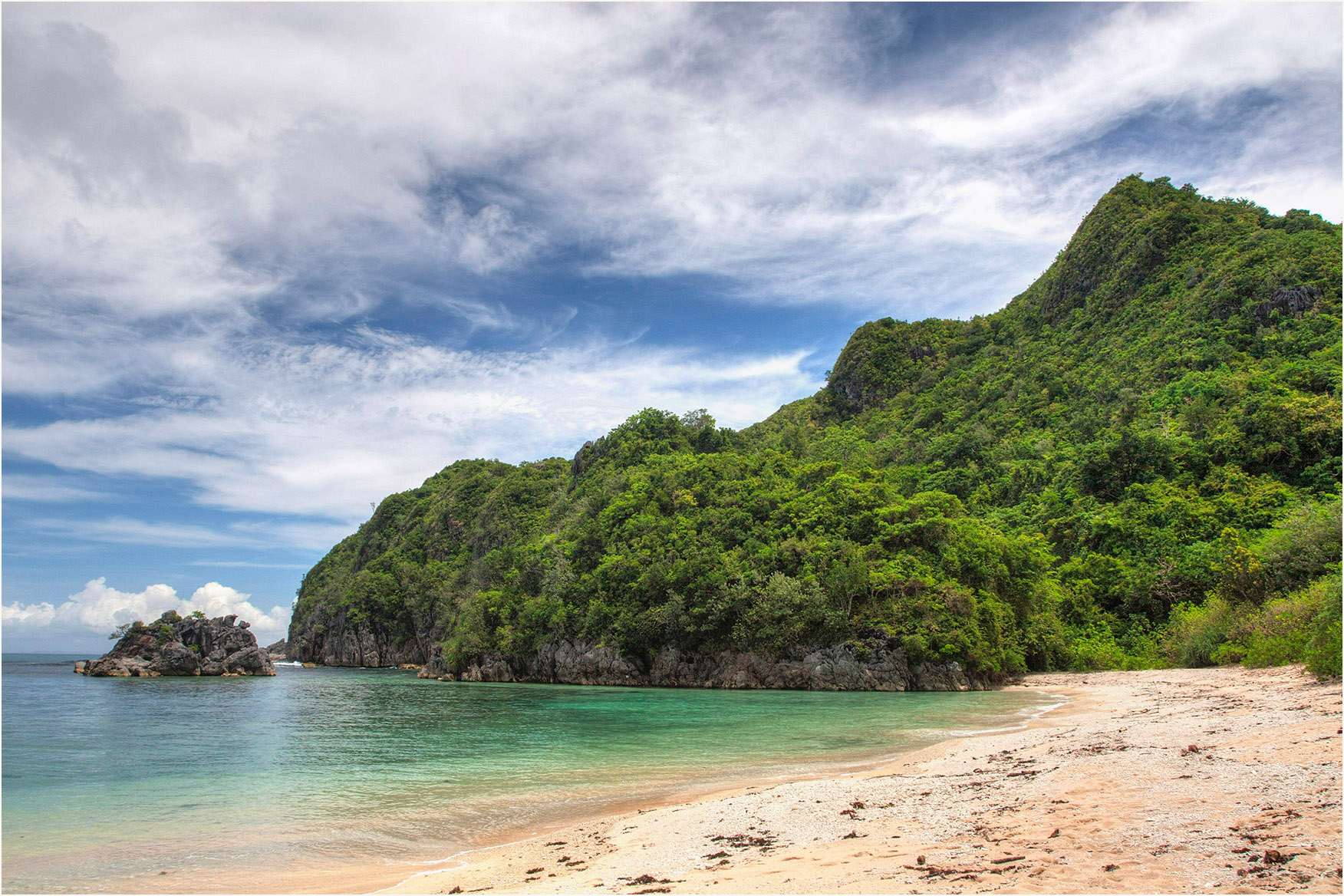
The season filmed in the Caramoan Peninsula of the Philippines.

The two tribes were selected prior to the start of the game: Bikal, composed of 10 returning Survivor contestants (the "Favorites"), and Gota, 10 new players (the "Fans"). Bikal won nearly all the challenges and was dominated by an alliance led by Phillip, dubbed "Stealth R Us". Despite this, dissent existed among Bikal due to Phillip's controlling style of leadership, especially with Corinne and Malcolm, who found the tribe's Hidden Immunity Idol. Brandon was also further put off by Phillip's control and talk behind his back, and at one point broke down and dumped the tribe's supply of rice and beans. Several of the tribe members were emotionally upset at Brandon's display, and the tribe voluntarily forfeited the next challenge so as to vote out Brandon on the spot, though the emotional toll had been taken. The Gota tribe was dominated by an alliance of six led by Sherri, opposed by a minority alliance of four led by Reynold. Reynold's alliance was quickly reduced to Eddie and him, who were spared due to the dwindling tribe needing their strength in challenges.

The tribes were shuffled on day 14, with both new tribes containing four Favorites and three Fans. The significantly weaker new Bikal tribe lost every single challenge, with the Favorite majority sticking together to vote out the new players. Malcolm, now on the Gota tribe, aligned with fellow athletic males Reynold and Eddie to avoid being picked off at the merge.

The tribes merged with eight Favorites and four Fans remaining. The new Enil Edam tribe quickly had two factions emerge: Malcolm and Corinne rallied the remaining Fans together to try to overthrow Phillip, while the rest of the Favorites regrouped under Stealth R Us. Only Sherri and Michael remained from the initial dominant Fans alliance; while Michael chose to align with Corinne's faction, Sherri and Erik decided to join Stealth R Us due to their distrust of Reynold and Eddie. This put Stealth R Us in the majority and Corinne and Michael were eliminated, leaving only Malcolm, Eddie, and Reynold in the minority. Their eliminations seemed imminent until Reynold won immunity and Malcolm found an additional Idol, which he gave to Eddie. In the hectic Tribal Council that ensued, Malcolm and Eddie played their Idols and Phillip was voted out.

However, their fortune was not to last, and Malcolm and Reynold were subsequently eliminated. While Eddie seemed the likely next target, he was spared when the former members of Stealth R Us decided to turn on one of their own, eliminating strategic threat Andrea with an Idol in her pocket, and Brenda after a kind-hearted gesture at the Loved Ones Challenge put her in a good social position. After Erik was evacuated from the game due to low blood pressure, Eddie was the final player voted out due to his popularity with the jury and having betrayed no one during the game.

Sherri, Cochran, and Dawn ultimately were the final three players. During the Final Tribal Council, Sherri was largely ignored, being perceived as a coattail rider after her original alliance collapsed. While Cochran and Dawn were acknowledged as a pair in their strategic gameplay, Dawn was grilled due to her emotional instability throughout the game while betraying several close allies, whereas Cochran was praised for being able to separate emotions from the game in addition to his dominance in the immunity challenges. This led to the jury of eight unanimously voting for Cochran to win.

Challenge winners and eliminations by episode
Episode			Challenge winner(s)		Eliminated	
No.	Title	Original air date	Reward	Immunity	Tribe	Player
1	"She Annoys Me Greatly"	February 13, 2013	Bikal	Gota	Bikal	Francesca
2	"Honey Badger"	February 20, 2013	Bikal		Gota	Allie
3	"There's Gonna Be Hell to Pay"	February 27, 2013	Bikal		Gota	Hope
4	"Kill or Be Killed"	March 6, 2013	Bikal	Bikal	Gota	Shamar
4	"Kill or Be Killed"	March 6, 2013	Bikal	Bikal	Gota	Laura
5	"Persona Non Grata"	March 13, 2013	Bikal	Gota (Note: Bikal forfeited the challenge in lieu of an impromptu Tribal Council.)	Bikal	Brandon
6	"Operation Thunder Dome"	March 20, 2013	None (Note: There was no reward challenge due to the tribe swap.)	Gota	Bikal	Matt
7	"Tubby Lunchbox"	March 27, 2013	Gota	Gota	Bikal	Julia
8	"Blindside Time"	April 3, 2013	None (Note: There was no reward challenge due to the merge.)	Cochran	Enil Edam	Corinne
9	"Cut Off the Head of the Snake"	April 10, 2013	Cochran, Eddie, Erik, Michael, Reynold	Brenda	Enil Edam	Michael
10	"Zipping Over the Cuckoo’s Nest"	April 17, 2013	Cochran, Dawn, Erik, Phillip, Reynold	Reynold	Enil Edam	Phillip
11	"Come Over to the Dark Side"	April 24, 2013	Survivor Auction	Cochran	Enil Edam	Malcolm
12	"The Beginning of the End"	May 1, 2013	Andrea		Enil Edam	Reynold
12	"The Beginning of the End"	May 1, 2013	None	Erik	Enil Edam	Andrea
13	"Don't Say Anything About My Mom"	May 8, 2013	~~Brenda~~; ~~[Dawn]~~ (Cochran, Eddie, Erik, Sherri)	Dawn	Enil Edam	Brenda
14	"Last Push"	May 12, 2013	Cochran	Cochran	Enil Edam	Erik
14	"Last Push"	May 12, 2013	Cochran	Cochran	Enil Edam	Eddie
15	"Reunion"	May 12, 2013				

In the case of multiple tribes or castaways who win reward or immunity, they are listed in order of finish, or alphabetically where it was a team effort; where one castaway won and invited others, the invitees are in brackets.

== Episodes ==
No. overall	No. in season	Title	Rating/share (household)	Rating/share (18-49)	Original release date	U.S. viewers (millions)	Weekly rank
382	1	"She Annoys Me Greatly"	5.5/9	2.4/7	February 13, 2013	8.94	#18
After the ten Favorites were introduced to the ten Fans, the two tribes immediately started the Reward Challenge.: Reward Challenge: Facing off two on two, the tribes would try to retrieve a ring and return with it to their starting flag. The tribe would score a point when one of their members had one hand on the ring and one hand on the flag pole. The first tribe to score four points would win flint and 20 pounds (9.1 kg) of beans. By Any Means Necessary challenge from Survivor: Palau.; While the Fans won the first round, the Favorites swept the next rounds to take the win. At the Gota camp, Matt and Shamar argued over whether to concentrate on building a shelter or making fire. The two patched things up after Shamar stepped in with the correct technique for starting fire with the fire-saw method. Pairs of alliances formed between Reynold & Allie and Eddie & Hope, and the four then agreed to align together. The snuggling overnight between the pairs caused the other three women of Gota (Julia, Laura, and Sherri) to align. Michael said he would align with the three women, but really kept his options open along with Matt. Over at the Bikal camp, Francesca decided that she was not going to be voted out first again and tried to make as many alliances as she could. She even said that she would "eat [a] rock" that she found on the ground if she went home first again. Meanwhile, Phillip gathered up an alliance with Andrea, Cochran, Corinne, Dawn, and Malcolm. He offered Erik a take-it-or-leave-it option to join the alliance, but Erik did not like the strong arm tactic.: Immunity Challenge: Two members from each tribe would climb up a four story tower. Once each pair got on their designated story, they smashed crates on a platform beneath them. The crates would shatter on impact to release sandbags. Once all three crates were tossed over, the pair would return to the start and another pair would race to the next floor. Once all of the crates were retrieved, two castaways would retrieve the sandbags. One castaway would then try to toss six sandbags into six targets. The first castaway to get a sandbag in all six targets would win immunity for their tribe.; At the Immunity Challenge, the Favorites got an early lead during the tower stage, but Reynold made short work of the sandbag tossing stage to give the Fans the win. Back at camp, Francesca tried get the tribe to vote for Phillip, while Phillip wanted his alliance to vote out Francesca. Brandon, Brenda, and Erik agreed to vote with Francesca, but Brandon and Erik suddenly got spooked by Andrea (who was playing both voting blocs) and wanted to vote her out instead. At Tribal Council, Phillip's alliance of six voted for Francesca, due to her threatening strategy and she was voted out, making her the only player to be the first voted out twice.
383	2	"Honey Badger"	5.7/9	2.4/7	February 20, 2013	9.32	#22
After returning to camp, Brandon was upset about the vote against Francesca and told Erik that he wanted to channel his uncle, Russell Hantz, and play the game dirty. However, he changed his mind the next morning. Over at Gota, Shamar's laziness at camp was annoying the tribe and the alliance of Allie, Eddie, Hope and Reynold wanted to vote him out. Sherri wanted to keep Shamar in the game to strengthen her own alliance so she told him that he was part of her alliance and to keep annoying the alliance of four.: Reward/Immunity Challenge: Three tribe members would be pulled on a raft by three other tribe members to a platform out on the ocean. The three would then dive down to release bamboo sticks in a cage to free nine rings. Once all nine rings were freed, the three would board the raft again to be pulled back to the beach with the rings. The remaining three tribe members would then toss the rings onto three posts. The first tribe to have three rings on their posts would win immunity and fishing gear. Sea Salvage challenge from Survivor: China.; At the combined Reward/Immunity Challenge, the Fans struggled during the ring collection stage giving the Favorites the win. Once the Fans returned to camp, Reynold and Shamar had a public argument over what Reynold saw as Shamar's poor attitude. Matt considered joining the alliance of Allie, Eddie, Hope and Reynold in voting out Shamar, but Sherri tried to get him to vote against Allie. Reynold went looking for the Hidden Immunity Idol and found it. Laura noticed a bulge in his pocket just before they were heading off to Tribal Council, but she did not have enough time to warn her alliance and flush the idol. Instead, she outed Reynold's idol during Tribal Council. Reynold confessed to having the idol and said that he would play it then to get rid of it. But when the vote was about to be read, he pocketed the idol. He regretfully watched, however, as Matt joined Sherri's alliance and voted against Reynold's closest ally, and Allie was voted out.
384	3	"There's Gonna Be Hell to Pay"	5.9/9	2.6/8	February 27, 2013	9.17	#18
Tensions were high at the Gota camp after Tribal Council as neither Reynold nor Shamar were happy about how the voting went. Shamar was unhappy with his standing in the game and considered quitting, but decided against it due to the loyalty his alliance showed him. Over at Bikal, Corinne and Malcolm went looking for the Hidden Immunity Idol and found it.: Reward/Immunity Challenge: The tribe would race out into the ocean and climb over and into a bamboo cage. The tribe would then have to untie a door on the cage and drag a heavy chest through the door and back to the beach. Once back onto the beach, the chest would be placed on top of a track. The tribe would then have to use a ring tied to the end of rope to snag three segment of the track to complete the track. The first tribe to place the chest on their finish platform would win immunity and a reward of two chairs, pillows, a blanket, a tarp, and rope.; The combined Reward/Immunity Challenge was a closely fought contest won by the Favorites. Worried that her poor performance during the challenge would put a target on her back, Laura suggested to her alliance that they split the vote between Eddie and Hope to flush the Hidden Immunity Idol. This would force a three-way tied vote between Eddie, Hope, and Shamar, and the alliance would then vote out Hope during the revote. Shamar hinted to Hope that she should vote for Eddie and save herself, but she went to Julia instead and told her that Shamar had revealed the alliance's plans. Again concerned about being voted out, Laura told Reynold that she could secure Julia's vote and vote out Shamar. But when the vote came at Tribal Council, the alliance of six stuck to their original plan, resulting in a three-way tie before eventually voting out Hope.
385	4	"Kill or Be Killed"	5.9/9	2.6/7	March 6, 2013	9.58	#11
At Bikal, Phillip told Brandon, Erik, and Brenda that they were part of his alliance in an effort to contain them, though in reality they were not truly part of the alliance.: Reward Challenge: The tribes would use planks to transport two tribe members from one platform above water to another platform a short length away. Once both tribe members were across, all eight tribe members will climb up and over the platform, swimming out to a smaller tower. The first tribe to climb the last tower and get all eight tribe members on or above the top deck would win a visit by a local bushman who would show them how to improve their camp and cook a feast. United We Stand challenge from Survivor: Cook Islands.; The Reward Challenge was closely fought with the Favorites just edging out the Fans. After Gota returned to camp, Shamar continued to annoy his tribe with his laziness around camp. During the afternoon, some sand scratched his eye. After a storm rolled in overnight and pounded the tribe, Shamar's condition worsened and the Survivor Medical Team was called in. The Medical Team determined that Shamar had scratched his cornea and he needed to be pulled from the game to be looked at by a specialist.: Immunity Challenge: Five tribe members would swim out one at a time to a platform, climb a tower and leap off it to smash a tile that releases a key. The castaway would then retrieve the key and return to the beach, allowing the next tribe member to go. Once all five keys were collected, two tribe members would use the keys to unlock a chest full of sandbags. They would then use the sandbags to knock off blocks stacked on a wall. The first tribe to knock off all their blocks would win. Smash and Grab challenge from Survivor: Cook Islands.; The Fans lost the Immunity Challenge even though Reynold's accurate throwing during the sandbag throwing stage nearly gave them a huge come from behind victory. Back at camp, Matt suggested that Gota should keep the tribe physically strong and vote out Laura instead of voting out Eddie or Reynold. At Tribal Council, Gota discussed voting for being physically strong at challenges versus staying loyal to alliances. When the vote came, Reynold played his Hidden Immunity Idol, but it was not needed as the majority alliance decided to keep the tribe physically strong and sent Laura home.
386	5	"Persona Non Grata"	5.9/10	2.7/8	March 13, 2013	9.89	#14
On the night of day 10, Brandon told his tribe that he was volunteering to be voted out because he felt he was being selfish for leaving his family at home without him. He told the tribe that he considered sabotaging the camp as a way to get them to vote him out, but instead decided to tell them upfront to vote him out. However, by the next morning, Brandon had changed his mind and was back to staying in the game for his family.: Reward Challenge: Two members from each tribe would hold on to a rope that would suspend a net. The castaways from the other tribe would attempt to toss coconuts into the net which would weigh it down. The castaway who held on to the rope the longest without letting the net touch the ground would win steaks, sausages, vegetables, condiments, and wine for their tribe. Net Bucket challenge from Survivor: Samoa.; At the Reward Challenge, Phillip was the last one holding up his net, giving his tribe the win. When Gota returned to camp, everybody went looking for the new Hidden Immunity Idol. Reynold found it and told Eddie that he had it. Over at Bikal, Brandon became upset that Phillip was taking credit for the win at the Reward Challenge and the two argued over what Brandon called Phillip's dictatorial attitude. The two tried to smooth things over and shook hands, but Phillip wanted Brandon voted out as soon as possible. The tension continued to simmer between them until day 13 when things came to a boil. Phillip told Andrea that he was considering throwing the challenge. Andrea passed this along to Brandon. Phillip and Brandon stepped away from camp to again try to settle things between them. Phillip told Brandon that he was not sure he could trust him. Brandon told Phillip that the Stealth R Us nicknames were demeaning and nobody liked him. Phillip said that if that was true, the tribe would vote him out. Brandon then told Phillip "let me give you a reason to vote me out" and then proceeded to dump the tribe's rice and beans onto the ground. When the tribes gathered for the Immunity Challenge, Jeff asked several castaways how they were coping with the conditions. Brandon asked to step off the tribe mat to address Gota. He told them that he was going to give them a second chance and to not let Phillip get to the end of the game. Corinne raised her hand and spoke for the tribe stating that they wanted to forfeit the challenge and give up Tribal Immunity. This sent Brandon over the edge and he went off on his tribe. To ease tensions, Jeff called over Brandon to his side to let him have his say, but the meltdown continued. With things not settling down, Jeff had Erik hand the Tribal Immunity to Julia from Gota and stated that they will have a Tribal Council immediately without torches and fire at the Immunity Challenge site. Voting was done verbally. Brandon voted for Phillip, while the others unanimously voted for Brandon and he was sent home.
387	6	"Operation Thunder Dome"	5.8/10	2.6/8	March 20, 2013	9.79	#10
On day 14, when the tribes arrived at what looked like a challenge, they were instead surprised by a tribal swap. With a smashing of paint filled eggs, the new Gota became Andrea, Brenda, Eddie, Erik, Malcolm, Reynold, and Sherri. The new Bikal was Cochran, Corinne, Dawn, Julia, Matt, Michael, and Phillip. The new tribes did not partake in a challenge, but instead returned to their camp sites. At the new Gota, Eddie and Reynold told Erik and Malcolm that Sherri had been gunning for them from day 1 and they would be happy to join the Favorites in voting her out. Meanwhile, Sherri told her side of the story to Andrea and Brenda. Andrea and Malcolm later shared notes about the factions within the former Gota. Over at the new Bikal, Phillip approached Julia about flipping to the Favorites after the tribal merge. Corinne and Dawn were not happy that Phillip was talking possible alliances with Julia.: Immunity Challenge: In pairs, the castaways would race across a field to retrieve six large crates painted in their tribe's colors. Once all six crates were retrieved, the tribes would have to stack the crates into a staircase with "Fans vs. Favorites" properly aligned along the sides. The first tribe to complete the staircase and get all of their members up the staircase to the top of a platform would win. Crate Outdoors challenge from Survivor: Tocantins.; The Immunity Challenge was thoroughly dominated by Gota. With Brandon gone, Phillip and Corinne wanted to turn their attention to voting the other out, but they were stuck with each other as they had to keep the Favorites alliance in the majority. Phillip told Matt and Michael that he was voting for Julia and that they could join the Stealth R Us alliance if they followed one of his orders some time in the future. Matt and Michael told Julia that they would join her in voting for Dawn, but were really going to vote for Julia. The Favorites discussed voting out Julia or Matt, who was suggested to be a target by Cochran to break up his alliance with Michael. When the voting came at Tribal Council, the Favorites decided to vote out Matt and he was sent home.
388	7	"Tubby Lunchbox"	5.5/9	2.5/7	March 27, 2013	9.43	#13
After Tribal Council, Phillip and Corinne still wanted to vote each other out as soon as possible. Cochran told Phillip that now was not the time to turn on a fellow alliance member and to wait until the merge. When tree mail arrived and announced that the challenge would be one of physical strength, Phillip boasted that he could beat anybody at feats of strength.: Reward Challenge: The tribes would be clipped together by a rope carrying 20 pounds (9.1 kg) sand bags each. They would start on opposite sides of the course, racing through knee-deep water to catch the other tribe. If a tribe member drops out they must give their sandbag to someone from their tribe. The first tribe to tag a member from the other tribe would win a trip to another island where they would be a coffee bar, cookies, croissants, and brownies. Hot Pursuit challenge from Survivor: Palau.; However, when the Reward Challenge came, Phillip faltered, dragging his tribe to a decisive defeat. Back at camp, Cochran was concerned about Julia's ties to Phillip and wanted to make sure that one of the Fans was voted out. Phillip thought he had managed to get Julia to flip alliances and to keep that agreement to herself. However, she felt bullied by Phillip and she told Dawn that she felt she had to go along with Phillip's orders. Dawn told Phillip about this and he now wanted to vote Julia out since she had disobeyed his orders to keep it quiet. Over at Gota, Malcolm approached Reynold about setting up an alliance between them, Eddie, and Erik after the merge. Feeling that he could trust Malcolm, Reynold told Malcolm that he had the Hidden Immunity Idol.: Immunity Challenge: Three tribe members from each tribe would paddle out in a boat and then dive into the ocean to retrieve a statue. Once the statue is returned to the beach, it would be placed as the bottom of a tower. Three other tribe members would then use a grappling hook to retrieve five keys. Once all five keys were retrieved, the three would use them to unlock the tower. All of the tribe members would then pull on a rope to raise the statue to the top of the tower. The first tribe to have their statue at the top of the tower would win.; At the Immunity Challenge, Bikal gave Gota a better fight than at the Reward Challenge, but Gota again prevailed. The division between Corinne and Phillip reared up again when Corinne did not want to go with her alliance's split vote plan to guard against the Hidden Immunity Idol. Corinne preferred to vote out Julia immediately. Phillip preferred to vote out Michael. At Tribal Council, the vote came out a split between Michael and Julia. On the revote, Julia was sent home.
389	8	"Blindside Time"	5.7/9	2.5/7	April 3, 2013	9.25	#22
On day 20, a boat arrived at the Gota beach announcing the tribal merge. The boat took the Gota tribe to the Bikal beach where the newly merged tribe took part in the traditional merger feast. Malcolm named the tribe Enil Edam; unbeknownst to the tribe, this was to honor his mother Madeline, as Enil Edam is Madeline spelled backwards. Phillip told Andrea that they, along with Cochran and Dawn, could take themselves all the way to the Final Four. Corinne plotted with Malcolm about blindsiding Phillip, and they planned to gather a majority voting bloc comprising Corinne and Michael plus Malcolm's new "alpha male" quartet with Erik, Eddie, and Reynold. Their master plan was to vote along with the Favorites in eliminating Sherri before turning on Phillip at the following Tribal Council.: Immunity Challenge: The castaways would participate in a local delicacy food eating challenge. The first round would pit two groups of six castaways eating beetle larvae with three castaways moving on from each group. The second round would be the advancing six eating shipworms with three castaways moving on. The third round would be the three castaways eating baluts with two moving on. In the final round, the two castaways would eat pig brains. Pesky Palate challenge from multiple seasons, including Borneo, The Australian Outback, and Pearl Islands.; At the Immunity Challenge, Andrea, Malcolm, Eddie, Cochran, Phillip, and Michael advanced to the second round. Malcolm, Eddie, and Cochran then downed the shipworms to advance to the third round. Eddie struggled with the balut giving Malcolm the opportunity to face off against Cochran in the final round. The final round was a close and fast competition, with Cochran barely defeating Malcolm and taking the win, upon which he celebrated giddily. Back at camp, Phillip told Corinne that he wanted to split the vote between Reynold and Eddie, but since she needed both of their votes and wanted to keep them from being nervous, she lobbied to vote out Sherri, aiming to keep the eventual plot to blindside Phillip under the surface. Trying to gather support to blindside Phillip, Corinne talked to Dawn about joining the blindside. Worried about how her reluctance to share important information in her previous appearance resulted in the systematic elimination of her alliance, Dawn decided to relay the information to Cochran, and it travelled through the Stealth R Us' members until it reached Phillip. The core Stealth R Us alliance was concerned that Corinne did have the numbers to blindside Phillip, and went to work to blindside Corinne instead. Phillip told Sherri that she could advance in the game by voting for Corinne. Erik became the swing vote with Andrea telling him to vote for Corinne, while Malcolm told him to vote for Sherri. At Tribal Council, Erik decided to side with Stealth R Us, sending Corinne out of the game.
390	9	"Cut Off the Head of the Snake"	5.7/9	2.6/8	April 10, 2013	9.38	#20
After Sherri's show of loyalty to the Stealth R Us alliance at the last Tribal Council, Phillip declared her a member of the alliance.: Reward Challenge: Divided into two teams of five, one member from each team would stand on a small platform in the ocean to defend a net. The four members of the opposing team would then leap off a second platform one at a time into the ocean while trying to throw a ball past the defender and into the net. For every ball they get into the net, they would score one point for their team. The first team to score five points (edited in episode to show four points due to time constraints) would win a trip to a waterfall which the castaways would rappel down and then enjoy a picnic lunch. Jump Shot challenge from Survivor: Nicaragua.; The Reward Challenge was won by the team of Cochran, Eddie, Erik, Michael, and Reynold who defeated Andrea, Brenda, Dawn, Malcolm, and Phillip. Sherri was not picked during the school yard pick and sat out the challenge. While on their reward, Eddie, Michael, and Reynold pitched to Cochran an all guy alliance, but that did not appeal to Cochran as he did not want to join in an alliance with the Fans. While the others were on their reward, Malcolm approached Sherri and Dawn about splitting off from the Stealth R Us alliance and taking control of the game. However, the two women reported Malcolm's try to make a big move to Andrea and Phillip. Seeking to punish Malcolm for his disloyalty, the core alliance told Malcolm that the Stealth R Us alliance would be splitting the vote between Eddie and Reynold when in reality they would be voting for Malcolm. While on a trip to a lagoon, Eddie tried to get Andrea on his side and to vote with him.: Immunity Challenge: The tribe members would be in the ocean under a metal grate as the incoming tide rises. As the tide rises, the breathing space under the grate grows smaller. The last castaway to remain under the grate would win. Last Gasp challenge from Survivor: Palau.; At the Immunity Challenge, it came down to Brenda and Andrea. Although Andrea battled the water extremely hard, Brenda's handmade snorkel helped her outlast Andrea to take Individual Immunity. This also marked the first time a woman won this challenge. Back at camp, Malcolm started a plan to target Andrea. Keeping up the fake split vote ploy, Dawn told Malcolm that she would vote with him if Reynold showed her the Hidden Immunity Idol. Reynold did, but then also threatened her that if he felt she would not vote with them that he would play the Idol. This did not go over well with Dawn. Eddie told Andrea that her name was being discussed to be voted out. This caused Andrea to panic and she ran to her core alliance to beg them to change their voting plan. She wanted them to abandon the vote against Malcolm and instead vote for Michael as the safe vote. At Tribal Council, Phillip announced that Sherri was part of the Stealth R Us alliance and also said that anybody who is disloyal to the alliance would get voted out. After the votes were cast, Jeff asked if anybody wanted to play a Hidden Immunity Idol. Reynold stood up to play his Idol, but Malcolm told him to "hold up bro", and persuaded Reynold that after Phillip's speech about being disloyal, it was obvious the alliance had voted for Malcolm and that Reynold should give Malcolm the Idol. Reynold tossed the Idol over and Malcolm played it. But when the votes were read, the Idol went for naught as the alliance ceded to Andrea's wishes, voting out Michael who became the first member of the Jury.
391	10	"Zipping Over the Cuckoo’s Nest"	6.0/10	2.7/8	April 17, 2013	9.99	#12
When the tribe returned to camp after Tribal Council, the Stealth R Us alliance went off to have a private conversation and left Eddie, Malcolm, and Reynold back at the camp. The Stealth R Us alliance agreed they could now freely vote out any of the three as they had no Hidden Immunity Idol, but unbeknownst to them, Malcolm still had one. While off at the lagoon on day 26, Dawn accidentally lost her retainer, which contained her bottom teeth. She yelled for Brenda to come help her and threatened to quit if her teeth were not found. Brenda dove down into the lagoon and found the retainer. The two formed a sympathetic bond after the incident with Brenda saying that she was solidly behind Dawn.: Reward Challenge: The tribe would be divided into two teams of five. One at a time, the teams would race through an obstacle course of balance beams, a water slide, and a mud pit. They would then retrieve a bag of balls in the mud and cross a pit full of rice. Once five bags were retrieved, all of the team members would untie the bags and shoot the balls into a basket. The first team to shoot all twelve of their balls into the basket would win a trip to a resort and lunch. Muddy Waters challenge from Survivor: Philippines.; At the Reward Challenge, the team of Cochran, Dawn, Erik, Phillip, and Reynold easily defeated the team of Andrea, Brenda, Eddie, Malcolm, and Sherri. The next day, Dawn continued to unravel as she was sure that Andrea would turn against the Stealth R Us alliance and blindside her at the next Tribal Council. Her paranoia made Cochran and Phillip concerned, but things turned around the next day after Dawn got some sleep. The Stealth R Us alliance agreed to split their vote 4–3 against Reynold and Malcolm just in case one of them had a Hidden Immunity Idol.: Immunity Challenge: Competing in two heats of five, the castaways would race across a platform, dive into the ocean, swim under the platform with the aid of a rope, climb back up onto the platform, retrieve a ring and put it on a post on the other side of the platform. They would have to complete two laps of this course. The first two castaways to finish their heat would move on to the final round. In the final round, the castaways would have to complete five laps on the course to win. Keel Hauling challenge from Survivor: Pearl Islands.; At the Immunity Challenge, Reynold and Andrea won their heat over Cochran, Dawn, and Sherri. Before the second heat was to be run, Phillip said that he was opting out of the challenge due to the underwater stage of the challenge reminding him of a childhood incident. With the second heat down to four, Malcolm won the heat and Eddie should have joined him, but he missed the post with his second ring, allowing Brenda to join the final round. In the final round, it was neck and neck until the end where Reynold defeated Malcolm. With Reynold's win spoiling the Stealth R Us voting plan, they switched to a vote split between Eddie and Malcolm. But their plans were further spoiled when Malcolm found a Hidden Immunity Idol in full view of Andrea, Dawn, and Eddie. The Stealth R Us alliance decided to stick with the split vote plan. At Tribal Council, Eddie thought he was sure to go home, but the Stealth R Us alliance was stunned when Malcolm pulled out his second Hidden Immunity Idol and gave it to Eddie. There was a lot of whispering among the alliance as they tried to figure out how they were going to vote now that all three outsiders had immunity. Malcolm announced that his "Three Amigos" of himself, Eddie, and Reynold were going to vote for Phillip, due to the fact he was sucking the life out of the game, labelling Phillip a "Fun-sponge". Phillip told his alliance that they should continue their original split voting plan just in case Eddie and Malcolm did not play their Idols. But when the vote came, they did play them. Everybody in the Stealth R Us alliance except Erik kept to the split vote plan, leaving their votes discarded. The 4 majority votes against Eddie were voided, and Phillip, who had the 2nd highest number of votes, was sent to the jury.
392	11	"Come Over to the Dark Side"	5.9/10	2.9/8	April 24, 2013	10.31	#5
With Phillip out of the game, Erik saw his departure as an opportunity to make a move while Cochran and Brenda were shocked and uncertain about their futures. Day 29's tree mail announced the Survivor Auction. Everybody purchased at least one item, with Malcolm and Cochran being the biggest winners by purchasing a clue to the Hidden Immunity Idol and an advantage at the Immunity Challenge, respectively. The next day, Andrea followed Malcolm all day to prevent him from finding the Hidden Immunity Idol.: Immunity Challenge: With one hand, the castaways would hang on to a rope with several knots tied into it. The rope would be tied to one end of a heavy log. The other end of the log would be connected to a pivot point on a platform that the castaways would stand on. The castaways would start at the knot closest to the end of the log. Every five minutes, they would change hands and move one knot further down the rope. This would increase the angle of the log at the pivot point and increase the weight that the castaways would have to hold. The castaway who held on to the rope the longest would win. Drop a Log challenge from Survivor: Samoa.; At the Immunity Challenge, Cochran's advantage was revealed to be that any time during the challenge, he could move up two knots on the rope. He used this advantage to ultimately defeat Eddie and take his second Individual Immunity. Back at camp, Malcolm tried to get Sherri to flip and join the Three Amigos alliance and promising to take her to the final three. Meanwhile, Reynold tried to get Erik to flip. But when the vote came at Tribal Council, Sherri and Erik stuck to their alliance and the vote was split three votes a piece to Andrea, Malcolm, and Reynold. On the revote, the tally was unanimous and Malcolm was sent to the jury.
393	12	"The Beginning of the End"	5.8/10	2.4/8	May 1, 2013	9.25	#19
Day 31's tree-mail announced a surprise Immunity Challenge instead of the Reward Challenge that the castaways expected. When they got to the challenge site, Jeff announced that it would be a combined Reward/Immunity Challenge.: Reward/Immunity Challenge: The castaways would stand barefoot on wooden slats on an a-frame that was floating out in the water and try to remain balanced on top of the a-frame. After 15 minutes, the castaways would move up to a second set of slats making balancing more difficult. After another 15 minutes, the castaways would move to the top of the a-frame where they would have to balance until the end of the challenge. The last castaway remaining on the a-frame would win immunity and a reward of information in the game. Bermuda Triangles challenge from Survivor: Marquesas.; With the castaways balanced on the first set of slats, Jeff offered up a plate of donuts and a glass of milk to whoever jumped off. Erik and Eddie agreed to jump off together. When the castaways moved up to the second set of slats, Jeff offered three hot dogs and a soda, which Cochran took. Thirty minutes into the challenge, the castaways moved to the top of the a-frame where Dawn, Sherri, and Reynold fell off, leaving Andrea and Brenda to fight it out. They tried to negotiate for one of them to win, but neither wanted to step off. They continued the challenge for three hours when they agreed to share the reward note and to make up their own fourth stage of the challenge by lifting their left foot off the top of the a-frame. Jeff counted down to this new fourth stage and Brenda fell off the top shortly thereafter to give Andrea the win. Back at camp, the reward note turned out to be a clue to the Hidden Immunity Idol. Andrea shared the clue with her whole alliance and they went looking for the idol. Erik found it and handed it over to Andrea. Brenda's determination to stick it out in the challenge made Andrea suspicious of Brenda as she could be a big threat in future challenges. Andrea pushed Cochran, Dawn, and Sherri to blindside Brenda instead of splitting the vote between Eddie and Reynold. But when Tribal Council came, the Favorites did not blindside Brenda and instead sent Reynold to the jury. After Tribal Council, Andrea was still lobbying hard to Cochran about blindsiding either Brenda or Dawn. Cochran told Brenda and Dawn about Andrea's plan. Brenda immediately turned against Andrea.: Immunity Challenge: The castaways would maneuver a buoy through a rope maze to a post. They would then untie a series of knots to release a key. The key would open a chest that contained a set of ladder rung puzzle pieces. The first castaway to assemble their ladder and climb to the top of the tower and raise their flag would win. Great Escape Run challenge from Survivor: Vanuatu.; Erik won the Immunity Challenge by a blowout over Brenda. Back at camp, Andrea continued to push for a blindside. Cochran figured out that Andrea wanted to take Eddie to the final three, possibly displacing Cochran in the final three. Suspicious that Andrea was leaving him out of her plans, Cochran talked to Brenda, Dawn, and Sherri about blindsiding Andrea. Just in case Andrea got paranoid at Tribal Council and played the Hidden Immunity Idol, Cochran got his alliance to split the vote between Andrea and Eddie. Andrea told Erik that she would like to go to the final three with him. Erik was not sure if he should join Brenda and Cochran in blindsiding Andrea or joining Andrea in voting out Brenda. At Tribal Council, the timing of a "big move" was discussed. When the vote came, Erik made his "big move" and decided to vote against Andrea. Andrea was not paranoid enough to play her Hidden Immunity Idol, so she was blindsided, and took it with her to the jury.
394	13	"Don't Say Anything About My Mom"	5.7/9	2.6/8	May 8, 2013	9.51	#18
Day 35's treemail was a Sprint HTC Evo 4G LTE containing videos from the castaways' loved ones: Brenda's dad Raymond, Dawn's husband David, Sherri's husband Jared, Cochran's mom Arlene, Eddie's dad Edward, and Erik's brother Richard.: Reward Challenge: The castaways and their loved ones would spin around in circles to unscrew three rails. They would then assemble the rails into a ladder to play a variation of ladder toss. The first pair to have three bolas on their ladder wins a trip with their loved ones to a boat anchored offshore with a BBQ. Ladder Tree Golf challenge from Survivor: One World.; At the Reward Challenge, Brenda's dad Raymond scored the last point to take the win. Jeff called Brenda over and gave her the offer to select one other castaway to join them and Brenda selected Dawn. Jeff then pulled out a second HTC Evo 4G LTE that had a video announcing that, not one, but two loved ones were on the island for the visit. Jeff then told Brenda that she could give up both her and Dawn's visit with their loved ones in exchange for the other four castaways to see their loved ones on the boat. Brenda called the decision a "no brainer" and gave up the reward. While the four were enjoying their visit, Dawn was livid that she missed out on her loved ones' visit back at camp because of Brenda. When the castaways returned from the visit, Cochran was concerned that Brenda's gesture would protect her for the rest of the game and would even get her votes at the final Tribal Council.: Immunity Challenge: The castaways would stand on a log on the edge of a platform over the water with their arms behind them hanging onto a handle. The handle would be tied to a rope. At regular intervals, Jeff would turn a crank that would uncoil more rope which would lower the castaways closer to the water. The last castaway that hangs onto the handle without falling into the water or stepping off the log would win. Splash Back challenge from Survivor: Nicaragua.; At the Immunity Challenge, the challenge came down to Brenda and Dawn. Dawn tried to cut a deal to end the challenge early since Eddie had not won and they would send him to the jury. However, Brenda did not agree to the deal and the challenge continued. Dawn would eventually outlast Brenda to take Individual Immunity. In addition to being concerned with Brenda as a growing possible jury threat, Cochran was also aware of two separate final 3 deals involving his main ally Dawn- one of Dawn, Erik, Brenda, and another of Dawn, himself, and Sherri, and that Brenda had already begun campaigning with the others to oust him the following vote off should Eddie go this one as planned. Back at camp, Cochran tried to sell Dawn and Sherri on sending Brenda home. Sherri readily agreed, while Dawn was conflicted on what to do. When the vote came, Dawn followed through with Cochran's plan and voted out Brenda. A shocked Brenda would turn towards Dawn and Cochran and state "I was honest with you guys, I was genuine with you guys", before dissolving into tears on the walk off.
395	14	"Last Push"	5.8/10	2.7/8	May 12, 2013	10.16	#15
As the tribe was leaving Tribal Council, Erik became dizzy. After the Survivor Medical Team checked him out, the doctors gave him an IV to stabilize him against a possible starvation state and pulled him from the game. When the four returned to camp, Cochran approached Eddie and they talked about taking Sherri to the final three. Day 37's treemail announced a Reward Challenge with an advantage in the game.: Reward Challenge: The castaways would use one hand to hold on to a rope to steady a balancing board. With the other hand, they would build a house of cards with wooden tiles on one end of the balancing board. The first castaway to build a tall enough house of cards to reach the finish mark would win an advantage at the final Immunity Challenge. House of Cards challenge from Survivor: Gabon.; At the Reward Challenge, all of the castaway's house of cards collapsed at least twice, until Cochran finally built a house tall enough to reach the mark. Back at camp, Eddie and Sherri agreed to take Cochran to the final three, while Dawn was being paranoid about being voted out. Cochran tried to reassure her that she was not going to be voted out, but he considered voting her out. Day 38's treemail announced the traditional journey honoring the castaways voted out before heading to the final Immunity Challenge.: Immunity Challenge: The castaways would race up a three-story tower to retrieve a bag of puzzle pieces tied to a post and then slide down a water slide. Two more puzzle piece bags would need to be retrieved before the castaways could start on their puzzle. The first castaway to assemble their puzzle would win.; Cochran's advantage turned out to be that his puzzle piece bags would not be tied to a post. While the advantage gave Cochran a huge lead into the puzzle assembly stage, he squandered it as the other three caught up to him, but he was able to recover and beat out Dawn for the final Individual Immunity. Back at camp, Cochran's decision came down to either bringing Dawn or Eddie to the final three. Sherri was not deemed any threat at all to win, and was thus completely safe. He chose to take Dawn, fearing Eddie's popularity with many of the male members of the jury, and Eddie became the final member of the jury. Cochran, Dawn, and Sherri enjoyed the traditional day 39 breakfast. At the Final Tribal Council, the three made their opening statements to the jury. The jury made their statements to the three and questioned the three about their game play. Malcolm told Dawn that she should own up to her game play and asked Cochran what quality he had that allowed him to advance in the game that Malcolm did not have. Eddie asked Sherri if she felt she got carried to the final three to which she replied forcefully she did not only to invoke laughter from several jury members, Dawn about how she could declare herself a strong player when she was seen as weak at camp, and Cochran about how the game had changed him going forward in life and asked if he would ever go on a bro date with the Three Amigos. Phillip "revoked" Sherri's membership in Stealth R Us, told Dawn that he would not vote for her, and Cochran that he played a good game. Erik asked Dawn about the damage she caused in her game play. He got into a major argument with Sherri about her game play until Sherri told him to sit down since he would not vote for her anyway. Michael asked Dawn and Cochran why Dawn was perceived as being a villain while Cochran was not. Reynold used his time to tell Dawn he thought she was a fraud and asked what she really thought of him. Andrea asked Cochran to choose an animal that he played the game most like and told Dawn she was proud of her game. Brenda asked Cochran why she should vote for him after he had orchestrated her elimination right after the selfless family visit gift she had given him and the others and he replied that getting rid of her was purely a strong game move and hoped she would respect that as a fellow player, and asked Dawn to remove her dental appliance in front of the jury to show that she would have stayed in the game if she had not recovered it.
396	15	"Reunion"	4.9/8	2.2/6	May 12, 2013	8.13	#25
Nearly a year later, the jury vote went unanimously for Cochran and he became the Sole Survivor by a vote of 8–0–0. The castaways discuss the season with host, Jeff Probst. For the first time in Survivor history, only castaways who made it to the jury phase were invited onto the main stage, creating a controversy after the reunion show aired.

== Voting history ==
	Original tribes							Switched tribes			Merged Tribe									
Episode	1	2	3		4		5	6	7		8	9	10	11		12		13	14	
Day	3	5	7		10		13	16	19		22	25	28	30		31	33	36		38
Tribe	Bikal	Gota	Gota		Gota	Gota	Bikal	Bikal	Bikal		Enil Edam	Enil Edam	Enil Edam	Enil Edam		Enil Edam	Enil Edam	Enil Edam	Enil Edam	Enil Edam
Eliminated	Francesca	Allie	Tie (Note: The first round of voting resulted in a tie. Per the rules, a second vote was held where the castaways involved in the tie would not vote and the remaining castaways could only vote for those who tied.)	Hope	Shamar	Laura	Brandon	Matt	Tie	Julia	Corinne	Michael	Phillip	Tie	Malcolm	Reynold	Andrea	Brenda	Erik	Eddie
Votes	6–4	6–4	3–3–3	5–1–0	Evacuated (Note: No vote; Shamar was medically evacuated from the game.)	6–0 (Note: Reynold played a hidden immunity idol; therefore the one vote against him did not count.)	8–1 (Note: An impromptu verbal vote was held after Bikal intentionally forfeited the immunity challenge.)	4–2–1	3–3	4–0	7–5	7–3–1	4–0–0 (Note: Malcolm and Eddie played hidden immunity idols; therefore four votes against Eddie and two against Malcolm did not count.)	3–3–3	6–0–0	4–2–1–1	3–2–2	3–2–1	Evacuated (Note: No vote; Erik was medically evacuated from the game.)	3–1
Voter	Vote																			
Cochran	Francesca						Brandon	Matt	Michael	Julia	Corinne	Michael	~~Malcolm~~	Malcolm	Malcolm	Eddie	Eddie	Brenda		Eddie
Dawn	Francesca						Brandon	Matt	Julia	Julia	Corinne	Michael	~~Eddie~~	Reynold	Malcolm	Reynold	Eddie	Brenda		Eddie
Sherri		Allie	Hope	Hope		Laura					Corinne	Michael	~~Eddie~~	Reynold	Malcolm	Reynold	Andrea	Brenda		Eddie
Eddie		Shamar	Shamar	None (Note: This player was not eligible to vote in the second round of voting.)		Laura					Sherri	Andrea	Phillip	Andrea	Malcolm	Sherri	Brenda	Erik		Dawn
Erik	Andrea						Brandon				Corinne	Michael	Phillip	Malcolm	Malcolm	Eddie	Andrea	Eddie	Evacuated	
Brenda	Andrea						Brandon				Corinne	Michael	~~Eddie~~	Reynold	Malcolm	Reynold	Andrea	Eddie		
Andrea	Francesca						Brandon				Corinne	Michael	~~Eddie~~	Malcolm	None	Reynold	Brenda			
Reynold		Shamar	Shamar	Shamar		Laura					Sherri	Andrea	Phillip	Andrea	None	Erik				
Malcolm	Francesca						Brandon				Sherri	Reynold	Phillip	Andrea	None					
Phillip	Francesca						Brandon	Matt	Michael	Julia	Corinne	Michael	~~Malcolm~~							
Michael		Allie	Eddie	Hope		Laura		Julia	Julia	None	Sherri	Andrea								
Corinne	Francesca						Brandon	Matt	Julia	Julia	Sherri									
Julia		Allie	Hope	Hope		Laura		Dawn	Michael	None										
Matt		Allie	Eddie	Hope		Laura		Julia												
Brandon	Andrea						Phillip													
Laura		Allie	Hope	Hope		~~Reynold~~														
Shamar		Allie	Eddie	None	Evacuated															
Hope		Shamar	Shamar	None																
Allie		Shamar																		
Francesca	Andrea																			

Jury vote
Episode	15		
Day	39		
Finalist	Cochran	Dawn	Sherri
Votes	8–0–0		
Juror	Vote		
Eddie	Yes		
Erik	Yes		
Brenda	Yes		
Andrea	Yes		
Reynold	Yes		
Malcolm	Yes		
Phillip	Yes		
Michael	Yes		

== Production ==
=== Filming ===
As with Survivor: Micronesia, the first season to have the "Fans vs. Favorites" subtitle, this season initially featured a tribe of 10 returning contestants from previous seasons opposing a tribe of 10 new players. It was the eighth season overall to feature returning players. Production of the show took place in the Caramoan Islands in the Philippines, the same location as the previous season. Participants' applications were due on October 4, 2011, with about 800 chosen for interviews in various states. From these semifinalists, 10 contestants were selected to participate in the show as fans.

=== Casting ===
According to Jeff Probst, producers had asked both Matt Elrod from Redemption Island and Shannon "Shambo" Waters from Samoa if they wanted to return for another season, but they both turned the offer down, believing that one season was enough for them and not wanting to let Survivor define their lives. The casting crew had also considered asking Lisa Whelchel from Philippines to participate, but realized that asking a mother to participate in back-to-back seasons would be difficult. "Troyzan" Robertson from One World was also considered, but ultimately cut. He would later return on Survivor: Game Changers. Tyson Apostol from Tocantins and Heroes vs. Villains was considered, but casting opted to go in a different direction. He would eventually return the following season, Blood vs. Water, and again for Season 40, Survivor: Winners at War. Stephen Fishbach from Tocantins was also considered but did not make the cut. He would later return for Survivor: Cambodia.

== Reception ==
Survivor: Caramoan received mixed to negative reviews from critics. Praise focused on the gameplay after the merge, but a lot of criticism went to the pre-merge and the cast. Andy Dehnart of reality blurred was critical of this season citing a weak cast, ugly moments, and repetitive episodes though acknowledged that the closing episodes were an improvement. Dalton Ross of Entertainment Weekly ranked this season 14th out of 40 saying that the pre-merge was "flat-out grating" but the post-merge was "spectacular". In 2015, a poll by Rob Has a Podcast ranked this season 24th out of 30 with Rob Cesternino ranking this season 16th. This was updated in 2021 during Cesternino's podcast, Survivor All-Time Top 40 Rankings, ranking 30th. In 2020, Survivor fan site "Purple Rock Podcast" ranked this season 21st out of 40 saying that the "pre-merge portion of the game is mediocre to awful, but there are some very interesting and memorable episodes post-merge." Later that same year, Inside Survivor ranked this season 35th out of 40 calling it a "messy, uncomfortable, and nonsensical season, a grim final chapter in the 'Dark Ages' of Survivor."

The gameplay of Cochran received a positive reception. In 2015, in the official issue of CBS Watch magazine commemorating the 15th anniversary of Survivor, Cochran was voted as the seventh greatest player of all time. Additionally, in a 2015 interview shortly before the premiere of the 30th season, host Jeff Probst declared Cochran to be his favorite season winner ever. In 2017, Entertainment Weekly had fans rank the first 34 winners of the series and Cochran placed 11th. In 2024, Nick Caruso of TVLine ranked this season 25th out of 47.

== Reunion show controversy ==
For the first time in Survivor history, contestants who did not make it to the jury phase of the game were not allowed on stage. Of the ten cast members that were allowed to sit on the stage, only six were spoken to (Cochran, Dawn, Andrea, Reynold, Malcolm, and Phillip). While Jeff Probst claimed that the new stage could not accommodate all 18 of the attending contestants, the format change caused controversy amongst the show's fans and fellow contestants, who all felt that it was unfair for the pre-jury contestants to be left out in the audience. This was also the first reunion in Survivor history where two contestants did not have an in-studio appearance on the reunion show. Brenda appeared by satellite, as she was unable to fly out and attend because she was in the late stages of her pregnancy. Brandon also did not attend the reunion; according to him, this was after his uncle Russell threatened Phillip on his social media, leading host Jeff Probst to personally call Brandon to ban him from the reunion, with Brandon agreeing to sit out the reunion if he was still paid the $10,000 appearance fee that players are paid to attend the reunion, which the producers agreed to pay him.

Erik, who finished fifth and was not given an opportunity to speak at the reunion, called out the producers for their treatment of the contestants at the reunion. Calling it a farce, he criticized how the reunion show left so many unanswered questions about the other contestants and his own evacuation during the season finale. He also voiced discontent on how the pre-jury contestants were completely left out in favor of featuring the show's previous contestants, like Rob Mariano and Rudy Boesch. Allie, who placed 19th, wrote a post on Facebook about how poorly she was treated at the reunion and shared her thoughts on what actually happened.
