= Wyatt Nash =

American actor and television personality (born 1988)

- Born: Matthew Wyatt Elrod; October 2, 1988 (age 37); Nashville, Tennessee, U.S.
- Occupations: Actor, television personality
- Years active: 2011–present
- Known for: Survivor: Redemption Island; Riverdale

Matthew Wyatt Elrod (born October 2, 1988), better known as Wyatt Nash, is an American television personality and actor.

Under his birth name, he was a contestant on the 22nd season of the American competitive reality television series Survivor where he placed seventh. Following his appearance on Survivor: Redemption Island, he chose to adopt the name Wyatt Nash (his middle name plus Nash for his birth city, Nashville) as his stage name.

Nash has appeared as Nigel Wright on the ABC Family series Pretty Little Liars and the Lifetime television adaptation of V. C. Andrews's Petals on the Wind. He portrayed the character of Charles Smith on Riverdale.

== Survivor ==
As Matt Elrod, he was on Survivor: Redemption Island as one of the season's 16 new contestants. He began the game on the Ometepe tribe alongside seven other new contestants and Survivor veteran "Boston Rob" Mariano. Elrod was initially part of Mariano's majority alliance. However, Mariano noticed Elrod bonding with fellow alliance member Andrea Boehlke; after Elrod shook hands with members of the rival Zapatera tribe following a challenge, Mariano plotted to eliminate Elrod. On Day Six, Elrod was voted off by his alliance, sending him to Redemption Island where he had to compete in challenges in order to return to the game.

After defeating six consecutive opponents, Elrod returned to the game on Day 19, joining the newly merged Murlonio tribe with six former Ometepe members and five former Zapatera members. The minority Zapatera alliance courted Elrod and Boehlke to join them to eliminate Mariano; after Elrod told Mariano about the Zapateras' offer, Mariano and his alliance—Boehlke included—voted against Elrod, and he was sent back to Redemption Island. Elrod continued to win duels, but lost the final duel on Day 36, which Boehlke won. Elrod finished in seventh place, and was the sixth member of the jury to determine the winner. Despite being blindsided twice, Elrod voted for Mariano as the winner. An offer was made for Elrod to return for Survivor's 26th season, Survivor: Caramoan, but he declined.

== Acting career ==
Following his appearance on Survivor, Elrod (now known as Wyatt Nash) appeared in the Nick at Nite drama Hollywood Heights as recurring character Cameron. He appeared in short film wages and had guest appearances in the television shows 1600 Penn and Mistresses. Next, Nash was cast as Nigel Wright, the helicopter pilot and Jenna Marshall's friend, in Pretty Little Liars. Nash also guest starred in an episode each of Rake and Dr. Ken.

On February 24, 2014, it was announced that Nash was cast as Christopher in the Lifetime television adaptation of V. C. Andrews's Petals on the Wind opposite Rose McIver. In 2015, Nash starred as Ryan, who is described as a Southern born-and-bred aspiring musician who falls head-over-heels for Molly, in the Hallmark Original Movie adaptation of the bestselling Karen Kingsbury novel The Bridge. In 2016, he started in the sequel The Bridge Part 2 opposite Katie Findlay.

In 2016, Nash was cast as Kurt Fletcher, editor of the campus humor magazine and son of the college president, in the Netflix series Dear White People. In 2017, Nash starred as Spencer in the Hallmark Original Movie Like Cats and Dogs alongside Cassidy Gifford.

== Filmography ==
Film & TV
Year	Title	Role	Notes
2011	Survivor: Redemption Island	Himself	Contestant; 7th Place
2012	Hollywood Heights	Cameron	recurring role
2012	Wages	Rhett	short film
2013	1600 Penn	Tad	Episode: "To The Ranch" (S 1:Ep 7)
2013	Mistresses	Hot Naked Guy	Episode: "Decisions, Decisions" (S 1:Ep 5)
2013	Pretty Little Liars	Nigel Wright	"'A' Is for A-l-i-v-e" (S 4:Ep 1) "Crash and Burn, Girl" (S 4:Ep 7)
2014	Rake	Dutch Sullivan	Episode: "50 Shades of Gay" (S 1:Ep 10)
2014	Petals on the Wind	Christopher Dollanganger, Jr.	TV movie (Lifetime)
2015	Dr. Ken	Hot Doctor	Episode: "Ken Teaches Molly a Lesson" (S 1:Ep 6)
2015	The Bridge	Ryan	TV movie (Hallmark)
2016	The Bridge Part 2	Ryan	TV movie (Hallmark)
2017	Dear White People	Kurt Fletcher	TV, recurring
2017	Like Cats and Dogs	Spencer	TV movie (Hallmark)
2019	Brooklyn Nine-Nine	Young Michael Hitchcock	Episode: "Hitchcock & Scully"
2019–2022	Riverdale	Charles Smith	TV, recurring
2019	Ford v Ferrari	Shelby Cobra buyer	

== See also ==
- List of American actors
- List of Survivor (American TV series) contestants
- List of people from Nashville, Tennessee
