= Miami Dolphins Cheerleaders =

NFL cheerleader squad

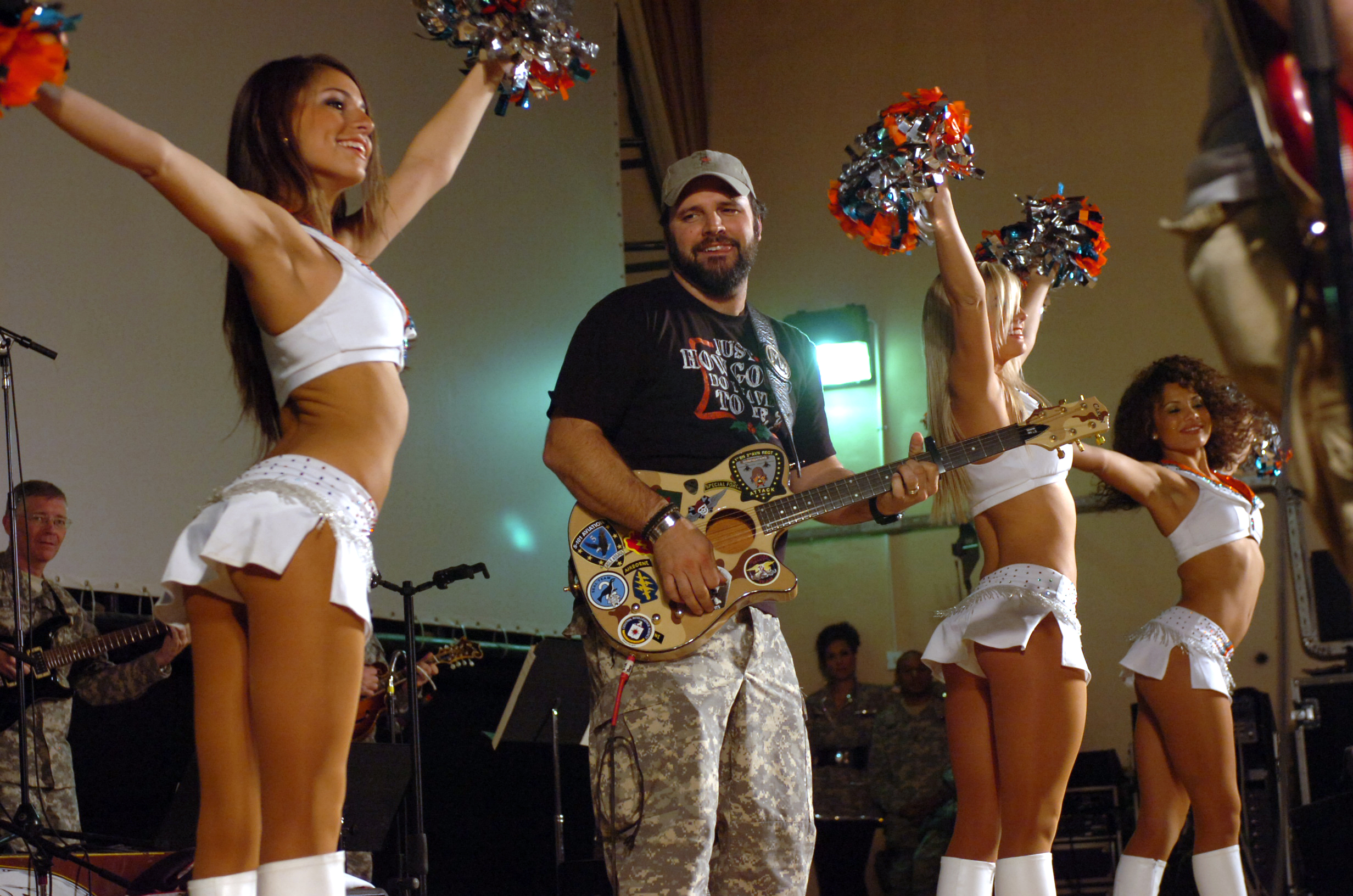
- Established: 1978; 48 years ago
- Members: 28
- Director: KaShara Garrett
- Affiliations: Miami Dolphins
- Website: Official website
- Formerly called: Dolphins Starbrites (1978–1983); Miami Dolphins Cheerleaders (1983–present)

The Miami Dolphins Cheerleaders is the professional cheerleading squad of the Miami Dolphins of the National Football League. The squad performs in front of more than 65,000 fans each game day at Hard Rock Stadium. squad hosts auditions every May. Like most other teams in the league, the MDC also has a youth cheer squad and help mentor young girls in the Miami area. The squad also makes USO trips. Every year, the MDC sends a cheerleader to the Pro Bowl.

== History ==
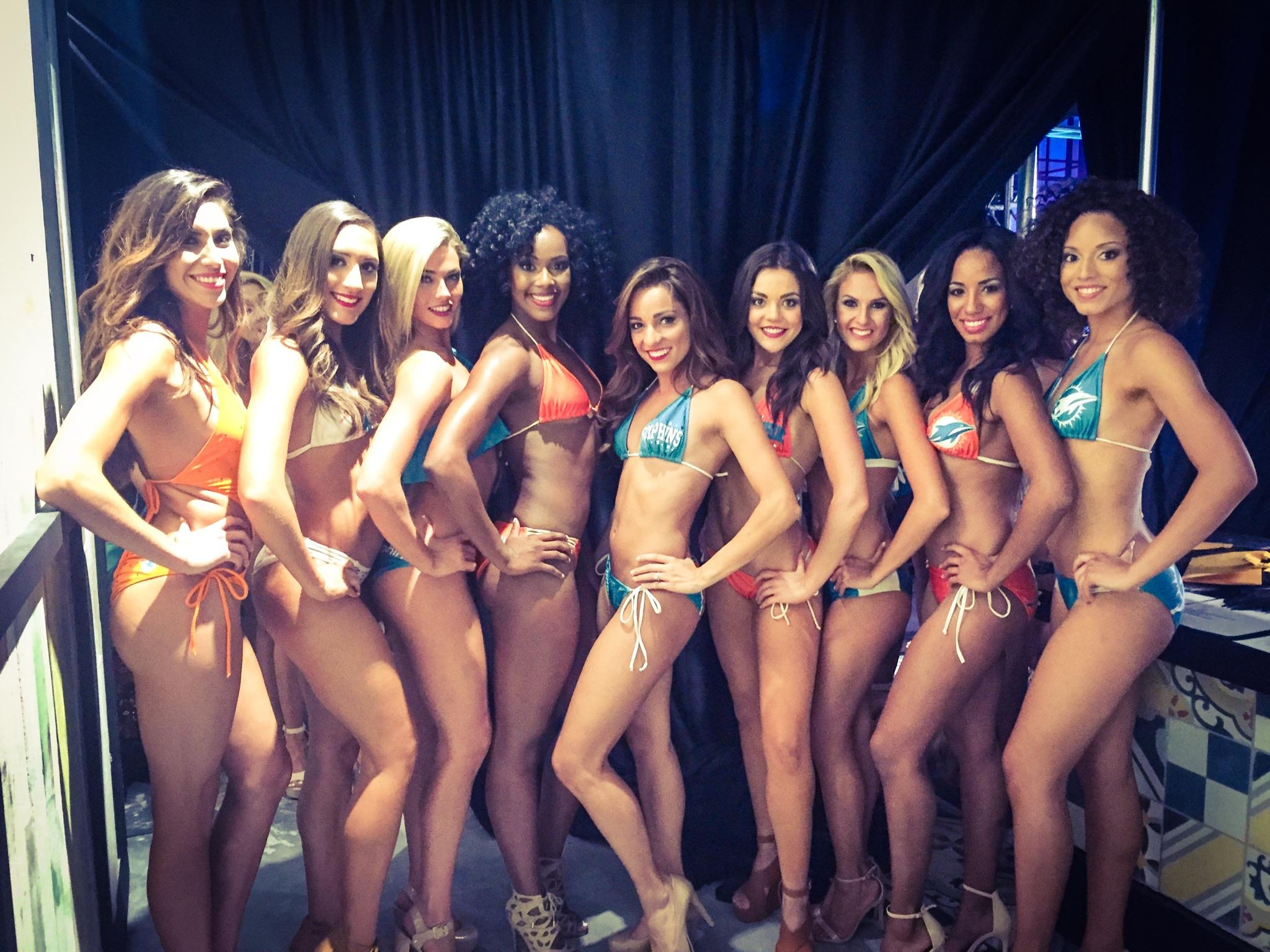
Swimsuit Show at Hardrock Stadium

The group's inaugural season was in 1978, but the cheerleading squad was around since the team's inception since 1966. The original squad was known as the Dolphins Dolls, consisting in 125 girls ranging from 8 to 18 years of age. The group performed in the Miami Orange Bowl until 1977. The professional group came around in 1978 under owner Joe Robbie, consisting of 30 women. The group was then-known as the Starbrites, under a sponsorship with Starbrite Car Polish until 1983, when the sponsorship ended. The Dolphins made a deal with Burger King to hold a "Name the Cheerleaders" contest, and the Miami Dolphins Cheerleaders was ultimately selected. In 1990, founder June Taylor retired and was replaced by Kathy Morton Shashaty, who was a Dolphins cheerleader from 1981–1985.

When Jimmy Johnson was brought in to coach the NFL team, he also brought Dorie Braddy, a former Dallas Cowboys Cheerleader, to be the cheer manager. She ran the squad from 1996-2004, when she named Heather Phillips the new cheer manager and she moved into game entertainment full-time. Heather Phillips would leave after 2007, at which point Emily Newton took over. Another former DCC, Trisia Brown, was hired as choreographer.

== Notable members ==
- Nadia Turner, (1996), Season 4 American Idol contestant
- Suzy Tavarez, (1998–2000), On-Air Personality, Miami radio station Y100-FM
- Brenda Lowe, (2004–2005), contestant from Survivor: Nicaragua and Survivor: Caramoan; later appeared as a model on Deal or No Deal.
- Jaime Faith Edmondson, (2004–2009), contestant from The Amazing Race in 2009 and 2011 (partnered with Cara Rosenthal, also a member).
- Pamela Silva Conde, reporter and news anchor for Univision Network
- Jeanette Dousdebes, (1997-1998), wife of former Florida Senator and United States Secretary of State Marco Rubio
- Mireya Mayor, National Geographic Wildlife Correspondent and History Channel's "Expedition:Africa" Wildlife Expert and Explorer.
- MJ Acosta-Ruiz, NFL Network Anchor
