= Tavares (surname) =

Tavares (European Portuguese: [taˈvaɾɨʃ], Brazilian Portuguese: [taˈvaɾis], also locally: [-ɾiʃ]) is a Portuguese surname. The Spanish version of this name is Tavárez. This surname was adopted by Sephardic Jews as well.

== Notable people with the surname ==
=== General ===
- Alda Bandeira Tavares Vaz da Conceição (born 1949), São Toméan politician
- António Raposo Tavares (1598–1658), Portuguese explorer and bandeirante
- Aureliano Cândido Tavares Bastos (1839–1875), Brazilian politician, writer and journalist
- Aurélio de Lyra Tavares, Brazilian general
- Carlos Tavares (born 1958), Portuguese businessman
- Charmaine Tavares (born 1943), American politician
- Chelsea Tavares, American actress and singer
- Daniel Tavares (born 1966), American serial killer
- Djé Tavares (born 2003), Cape Verdean footballer
- Gonçalo M. Tavares (born 1970), Portuguese writer
- Eugénio Tavares (1867–1930), Cape Verdean writer
- Eurico Tavares (born 1996), Brazilian politician
- Fernanda Tavares (born 1980), Brazilian supermodel
- Freddie Tavares (1913–1990), American musician and inventor
- Horace Ward Martin Tavares Silver, United States musician and composer
- Kibwe Tavares, British film maker and architect
- Maria Cristina Tavares, Brazilian electrical engineer
- Maria da Conceição Tavares (1930–2024), Portuguese-Brazilian economist
- Miguel Sousa Tavares (born 1952), Portuguese journalist and writer
- Monica Tavares, known professionally as Mo'Kalamity, roots reggae musician
- Patrícia Tavares (born 1977), Portuguese actress
- Rui Tavares (born 1972), Portuguese politician
- Stafford Tavares, Canadian cryptographer
- Tatiana Silva Braga Tavares, Belgian model
- Urbano Tavares Rodrigues (1923–2013), Portuguese writer and journalist
- Zulmira Ribeiro Tavares (1930-2018), Brazilian poet and writer

=== Sports ===
- André Luiz Tavares (born 1983), Brazilian footballer
- Brad Tavares (born 1987), American mixed martial arts fighter
- Clodoaldo Tavares de Santana, Brazilian footballer
- Diogo Tavares (born 1987), Portuguese footballer
- D'Jamila Tavares (born 1994), São Tomé and Príncipe runner
- Jimmy Tavares (born 1984), French figure skater and actor
- John Tavares (born 1990), Canadian ice hockey player
- John Tavares (lacrosse) (born 1968), Canadian lacrosse player
- Marcos Tavares (born 1984), Brazilian footballer
- Manuel José Tavares Fernandes, Portuguese footballer and manager
- Mickaël Tavares (born 1982), Senegalese footballer
- Mikoyam Tavares (born 1981), Cape Verdean-Portuguese footballer
- Nuno Tavares (born 2000), Portuguese footballer
- Stopira (born 1988), real name Ianique Santos Tavares, Cape Verdean footballer basketball player
- Thiago Tavares (born 1984), Brazilian martial arts fighter
- Tony Tavares, American sports executive
- Walter Tavares (born 1992), Cape Verdean basketball player
