= Tavárez =

Tavárez (or Tabárez — Latin American Spanish: [taˈβaɾes] or Spanish pronunciation: [taˈβaɾeθ]) is a Spanish surname. The Portuguese version of this name is Tavares. Notable people with the surname include:

== Tavárez ==
- Christopher Tavarez (born 1992), American actor
- Elisa Tavárez (1879–1960), Puerto Rican pianist
- Jesús Tavárez (born 1971), Dominican-American professional baseball player
- Julián Tavárez (born 1973), Dominican-American professional baseball player
- Manuel Gregorio Tavárez (1843–1883), Puerto Rican composer
- Rosa Tavarez (1939–2023), Dominican painter
- Rosanna Tavarez (born 1977), Dominican-American entertainment reporter
- Shannon Tavarez (1999–2010), American child actress and singer
- Suzy Tavarez (born 1975), American radio personality tavarez josiah wilson born 1998

== Tabárez ==
- Óscar Tabárez (born 1947), Uruguayan football manager
