= Eurico =

Eurico is a masculine given name. It may refer to:

== People ==
- Eurico Caires (1952–1989), Portuguese football midfielder
- Eurico Carrapatoso (born 1962), Portuguese composer
- Eurico Gaspar Dutra (1883–1974), Brazilian politician, military leader, and 16th President of Brazil
- Eurico de Freitas (1902–1991), Brazilian pole vaulter
- Eurico Gomes (born 1955), Portuguese football centre-back
- Eurico Guterres (born 1969), Timorese militiaman
- Eurico de Jesus (born 1977), Macanese racing driver
- Eurico Lara (1897–1935), Brazilian football goalkeeper
- Eurico Tomás de Lima (1908–1989), Portuguese pianist, composer, and pedagogue
- Eurico Miranda (1944–2019), Brazilian politician and sports director
- Eurico Dias Nogueira (1923–2014), Portuguese prelate
- Eurico Rosa da Silva (born 1975), Brazilian thoroughbred racing jockey
- Eurico Surgey (1931–2018), Portuguese swimmer
- Eurico Tavares (born 1996), Brazilian politician
- Eurico (footballer, born 1984), Brazilian football left-back Eurico Alessandro Degaspari
- Eurico (footballer, born 1994), Brazilian football defensive midfielder Eurico Nicolau de Lima Neto

== Fictional characters ==
- the title character of Eurico, the Presbyter, an 1844 historical novel by Alexandre Herculano

== See also ==
- Euric (420–484), Visigothic monarch
