= Shannon Tavarez =

American actress (1999–2010)

- Born: Shannon Skye Tavarez; January 20, 1999; New York City, U.S.
- Died: November 1, 2010 (aged 11); New Hyde Park, New York, U.S.
- Cause of death: Acute myeloid leukemia
- Occupations: Actress; singer
- Years active: 2005–2010
- Website: shannonsshare.org

Shannon Skye Tavarez (January 20, 1999 – November 1, 2010) was an American child actress and singer. She played young Nala in the Broadway theatre production of The Lion King by Walt Disney Theatrical.

== Background ==
Shannon Tavarez was the only child of Odiney Brown, a human resources administrator, and one of the daughters of a Dominican man with the surname of "Tavarez". She was a native and resident of Bellerose, Queens, and an honors student at P.S. 176 as well as a student of vocals and piano at the Harlem School of the Arts. She was chosen to play the role of young Nala after a cattle call audition at the Apollo Theater, and she became one of two girls who split the role, with each of the girls performing four shows per week.

== Illness and death ==
Several months after her September 2009 debut in The Lion King, she was forced to leave the show after being diagnosed with acute myeloid leukemia. Because of her African-American and Dominican ethnic backgrounds, she faced much greater difficulty in attempts to find a match for a bone marrow transplant. Alicia Keys, Rihanna, and 50 Cent recruited prospective donors from among their fans to help her find a bone marrow donor. Her former co-stars from The Lion King also helped her by selling "Shine for Shannon" key chains and bracelets to raise money to help her mother pay for her medical bills.

Tavarez was then able to find a partial bone-marrow donor match. She subsequently had an umbilical cord transplant (prior to which she'd been undergoing chemotherapy) because the doctors could not find a full bone-marrow-donor match for her. She died on November 1, 2010, at Cohen Children's Medical Center in New Hyde Park, New York, at the age of 11.

The lights at the Minskoff Theatre, where The Lion King was playing, were dimmed in her memory on the night that she died, and her funeral was held at Greater Allen A. M. E. Cathedral of New York.

In a statement released following her death, her mother (who started Shannon's S.H.A.R.E Foundation a year thereafter) said that "Shannon's dream was to perform on stage, and that she did."
