= List of Survivor (American TV series) contestants (seasons 21–40) =

Airings of the CBS reality series from 2000 to 2010

Survivor is an American reality television show, based on the Swedish program Expedition Robinson. Contestants are referred to as "castaways", and they compete against one another to become the "Sole Survivor" and win one million U.S. dollars. First airing in 2000, there currently have been a total of 50 seasons aired and a 51st upcoming. The program itself has been filmed on five continents.

Contestants usually apply to be on the show, but the series has been known to recruit contestants for various seasons. For Survivor: Fiji, the producers had hoped to have a more racially diverse cast, and hoped that a more diverse group would apply after the success of the racially segregated Survivor: Cook Islands. When this did not happen, the producers turned to recruiting and in the end, only one contestant had actually submitted an application to be on the show. For the most part, contestants are virtually unknown prior to their Survivor appearance, but occasionally some well-known people are cast.

A total of 772 participants (castaways) have competed so far (as of Survivor 51). 120 of those participants have competed in multiple seasons: 89 of them have competed in two seasons, 20 have competed in three seasons, eight have competed in four seasons, and three have competed in five seasons of the show. Fifteen seasons have featured or will feature returning players: six with all-returnees (Survivor: All-Stars in 2004, Survivor: Heroes vs. Villains in 2010, Survivor: Cambodia in 2015, Survivor: Game Changers in 2017, Survivor: Winners at War in 2020 and Survivor 50: In the Hands of the Fans in 2026), six with one to four returning players on tribes with new players (Survivor: Guatemala in 2005, Survivor: Redemption Island and Survivor: South Pacific in 2011, Survivor: Philippines in 2012, Survivor: Edge of Extinction in 2019 and Survivor 45 in 2023), two with a tribe of ten returning "Favorites" facing off against a tribe of ten "Fans" (Survivor: Micronesia in 2008 and Survivor: Caramoan in 2013), and one featuring a tribe of ten returning players playing against a tribe of their family members (Survivor: Blood vs. Water in 2013). Additionally, five contestants (Russell Hantz, Sandra Diaz-Twine, Cirie Fields, Parvati Shallow, Tony Vlachos) have competed on international editions of the series (namely, Australian Survivor, with Fields, Shallow and Vlachos competing on the international cross-over season, Australian Survivor: Australia V The World).

On two occasions, contestants have been cast but ultimately withdrew before the game began without being replaced: a 20th contestant, model agency owner Mellisa McNulty from West Hollywood, California, was originally cast in Survivor: Fiji, but dropped out and returned home the night before the show began because of panic attacks, while in Survivor: San Juan del Sur, the 19th and 20th contestants, sisters So and Doo Kim, were removed just before filming due to a medical emergency. So would later appear on the following season Survivor: Worlds Apart. Fiji, San Juan del Sur and Survivor 51 proceeded with an uneven gender balance.

== Key legend ==
Table key

^ Contestant played the game for a second time
◊ Contestant played the game for a third time
o Contestant played the game for a fourth time
‡ Contestant played the game for a fifth time

== Seasons 21–30 (2010–2015) ==
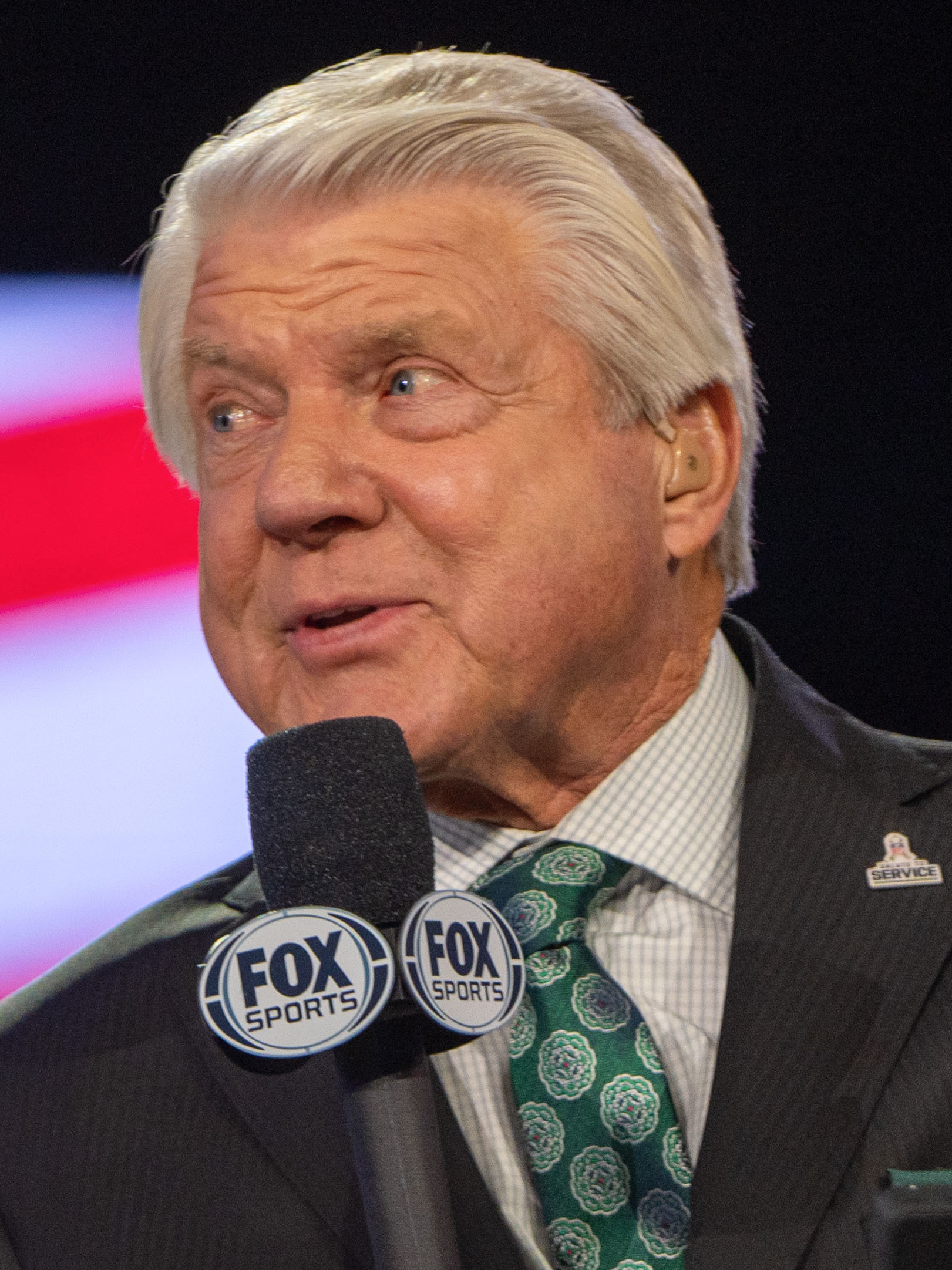
Jimmy Johnson, Survivor: Nicaragua

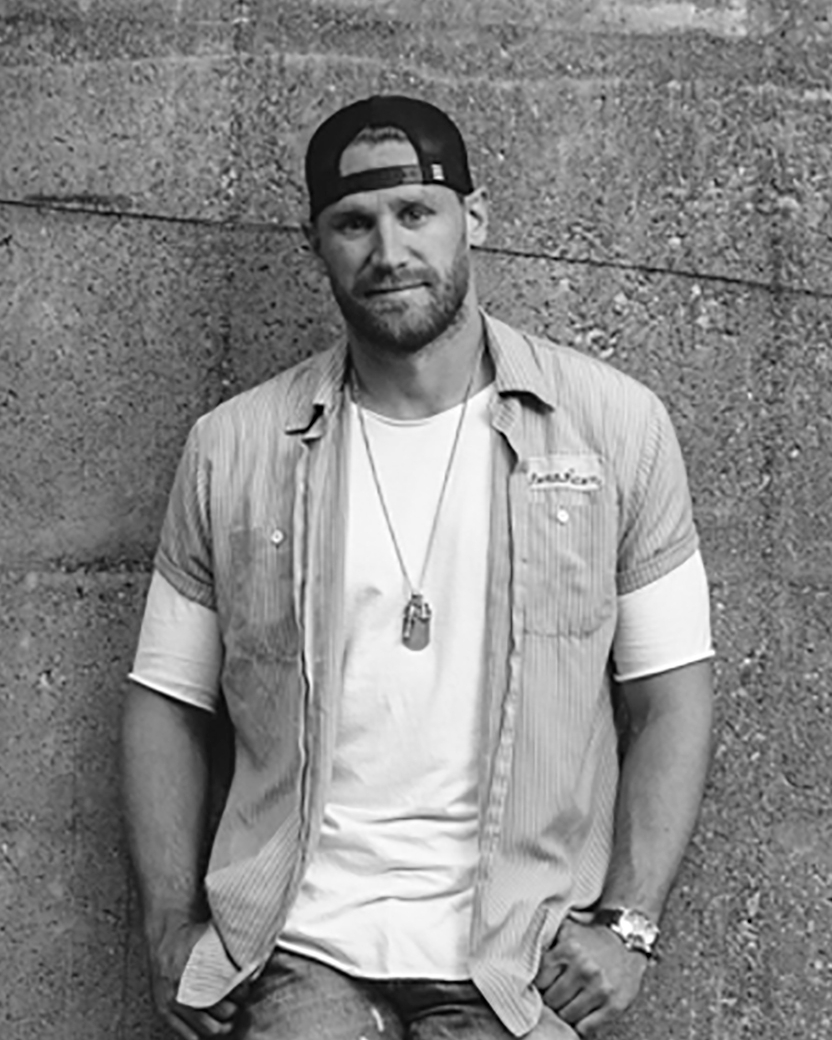
Chase Rice, Survivor: Nicaragua

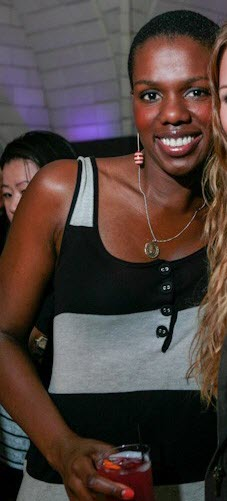
Francesca Hogi, Survivor: Redemption Island and Survivor: Caramoan

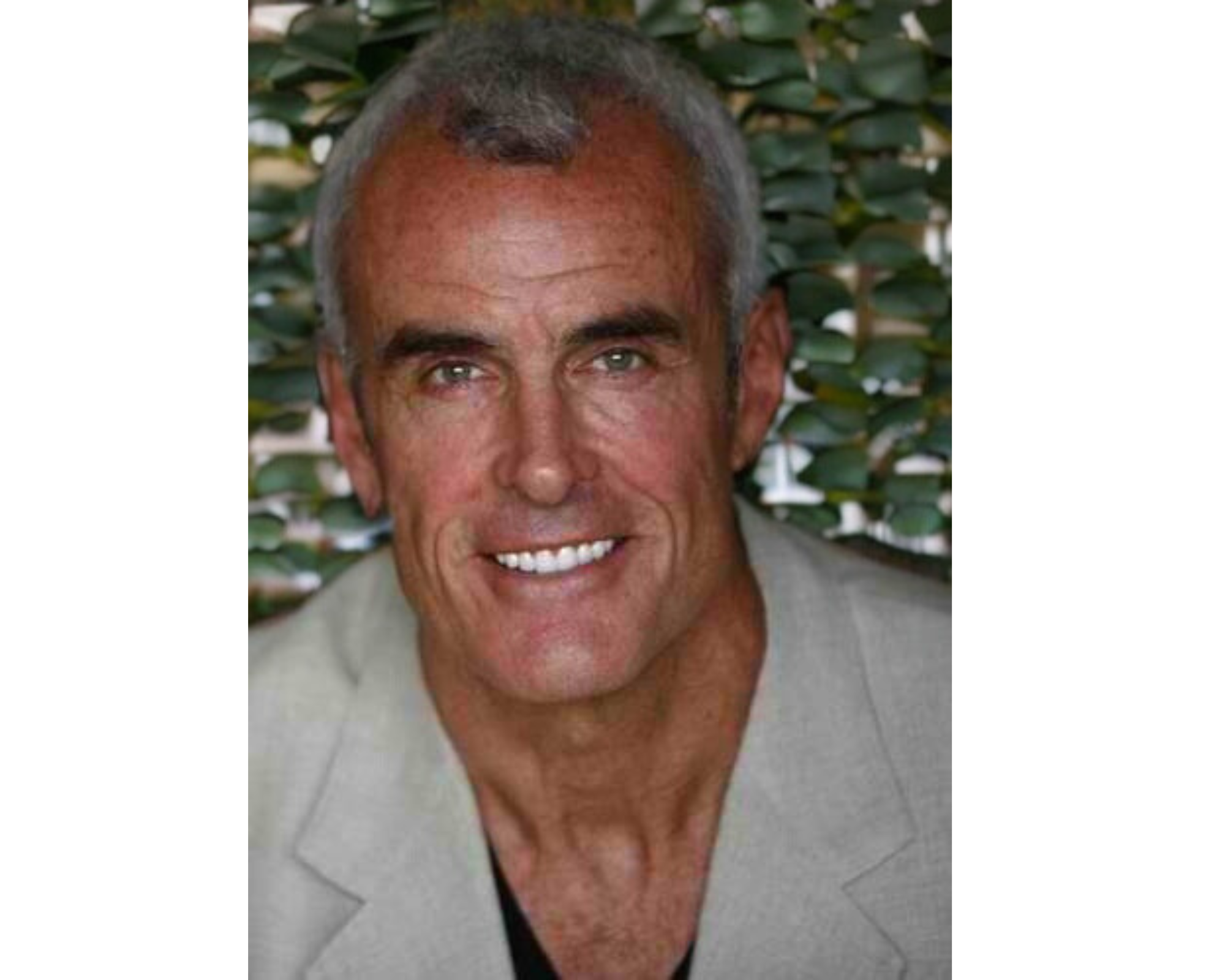
Steve Wright, Survivor: Redemption Island

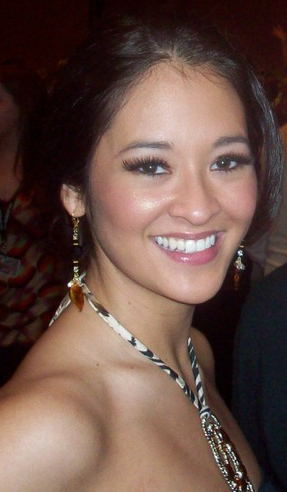
Elyse Umemoto, Survivor: South Pacific

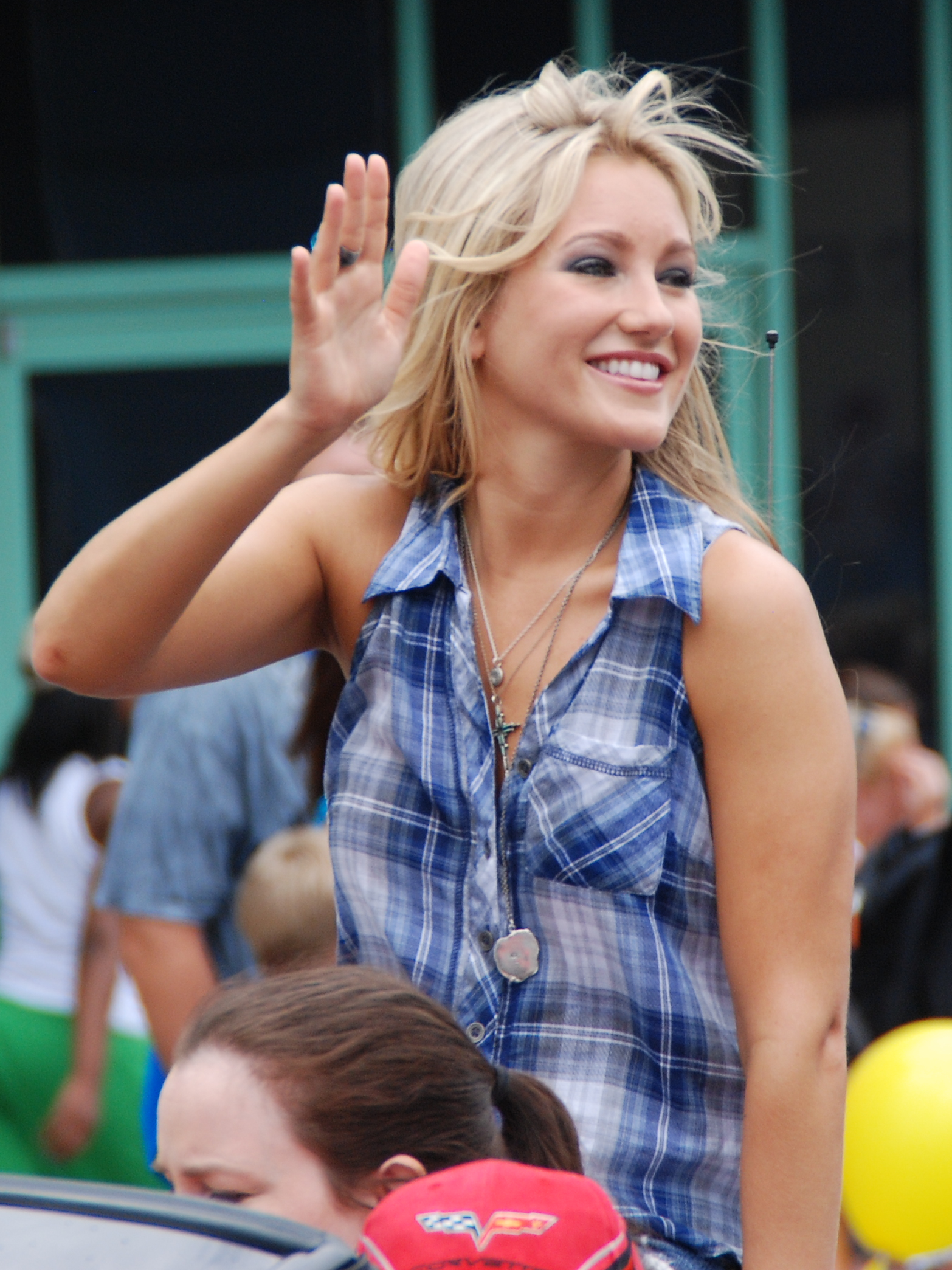
Whitney Duncan, Survivor: South Pacific

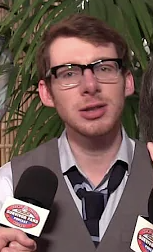
John Cochran, Survivor: South Pacific and Survivor: Caramoan

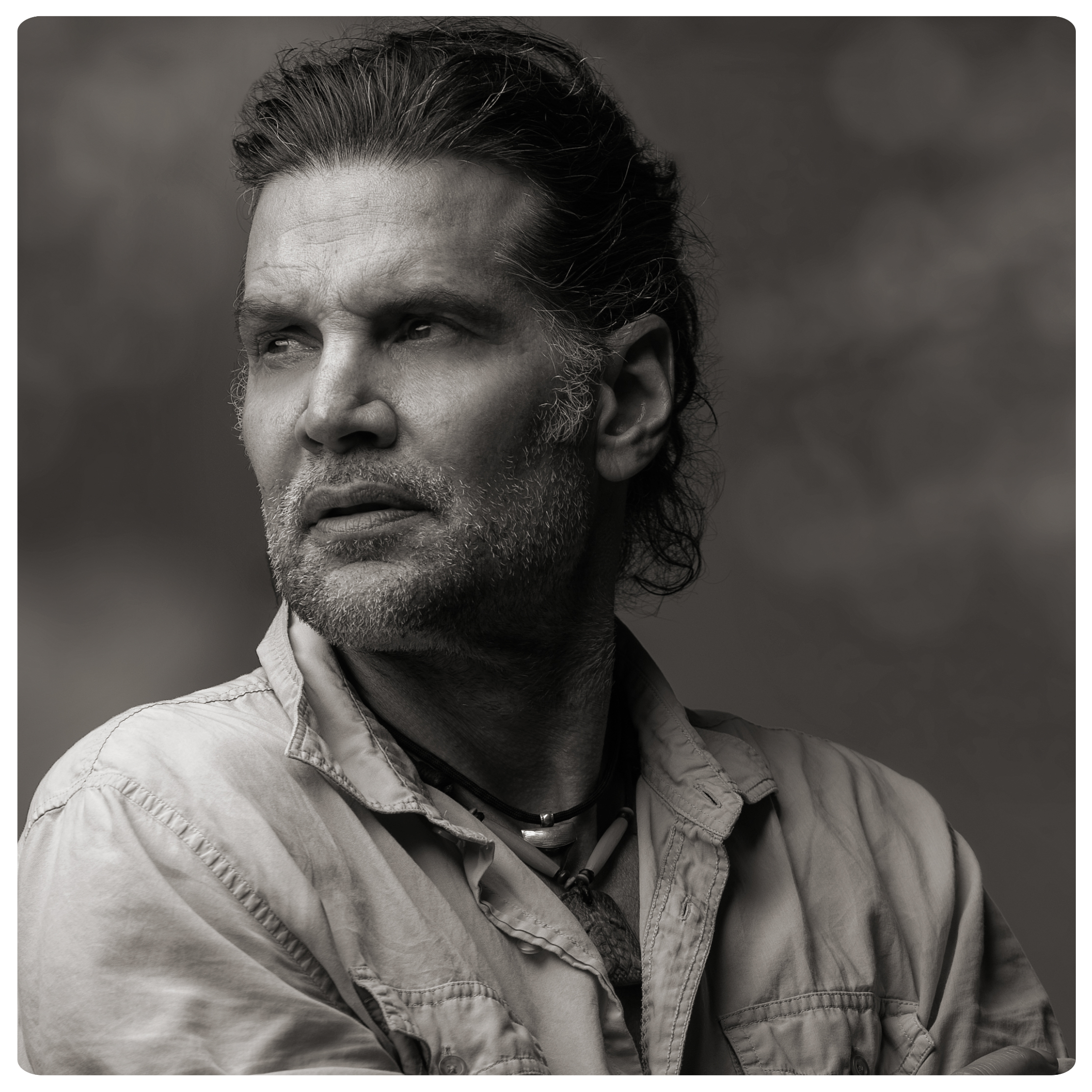
Troy "Troyzan" Robertson, Survivor: One World and Survivor: Game Changers

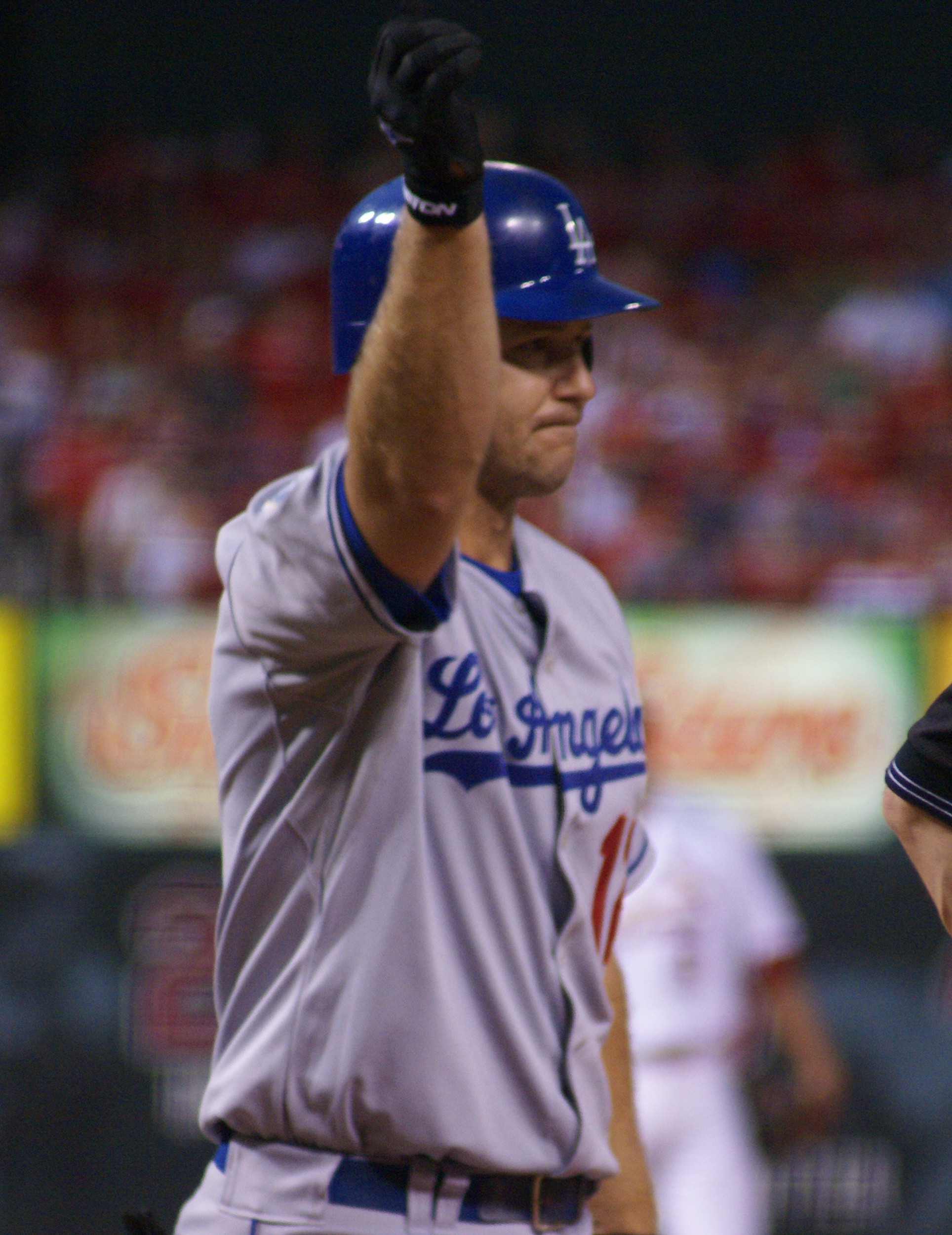
Jeff Kent, Survivor: Philippines

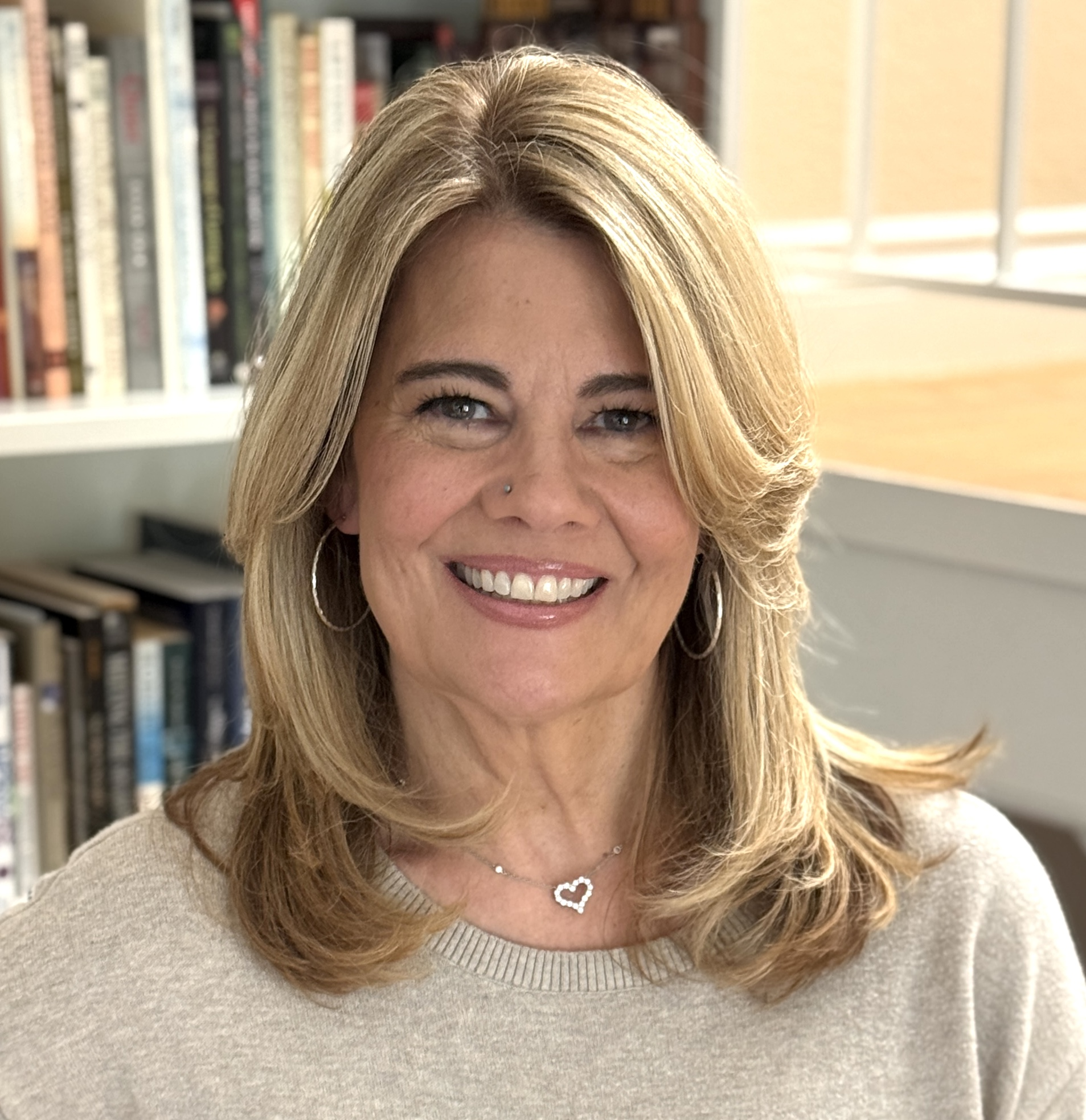
Lisa Whelchel, Survivor: Philippines

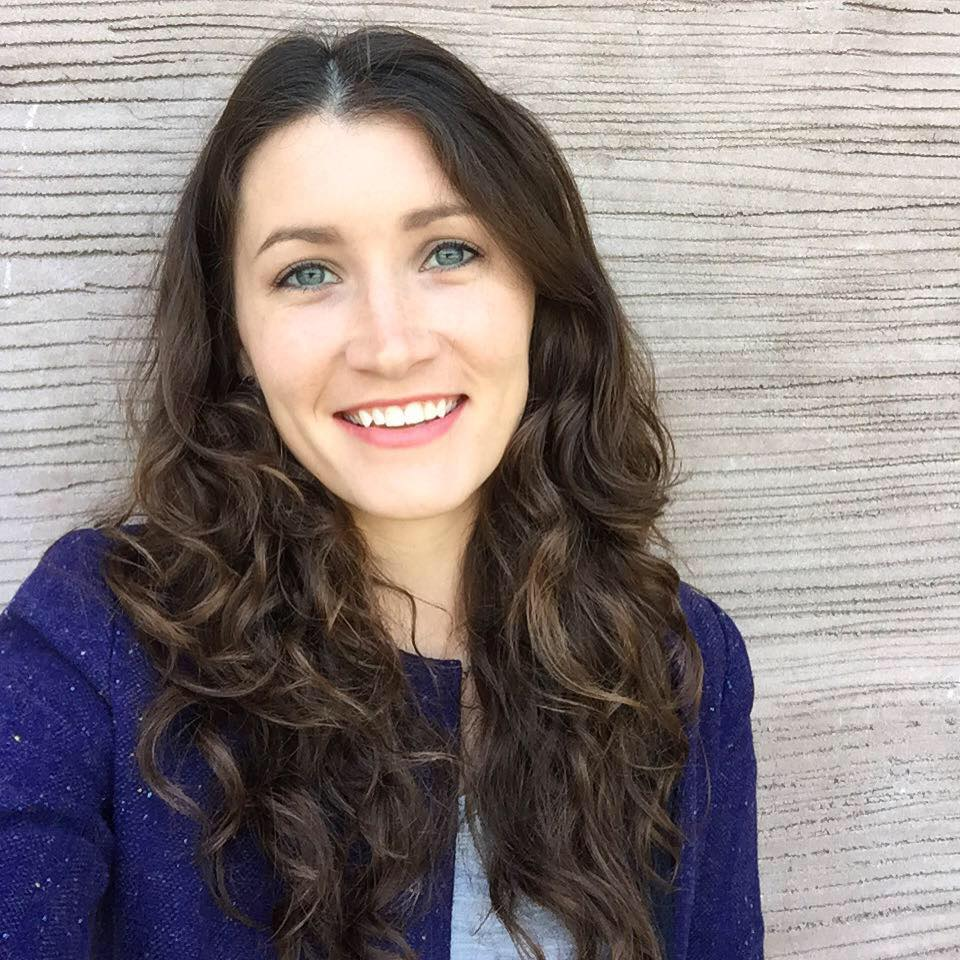
Julia Landauer, Survivor: Caramoan

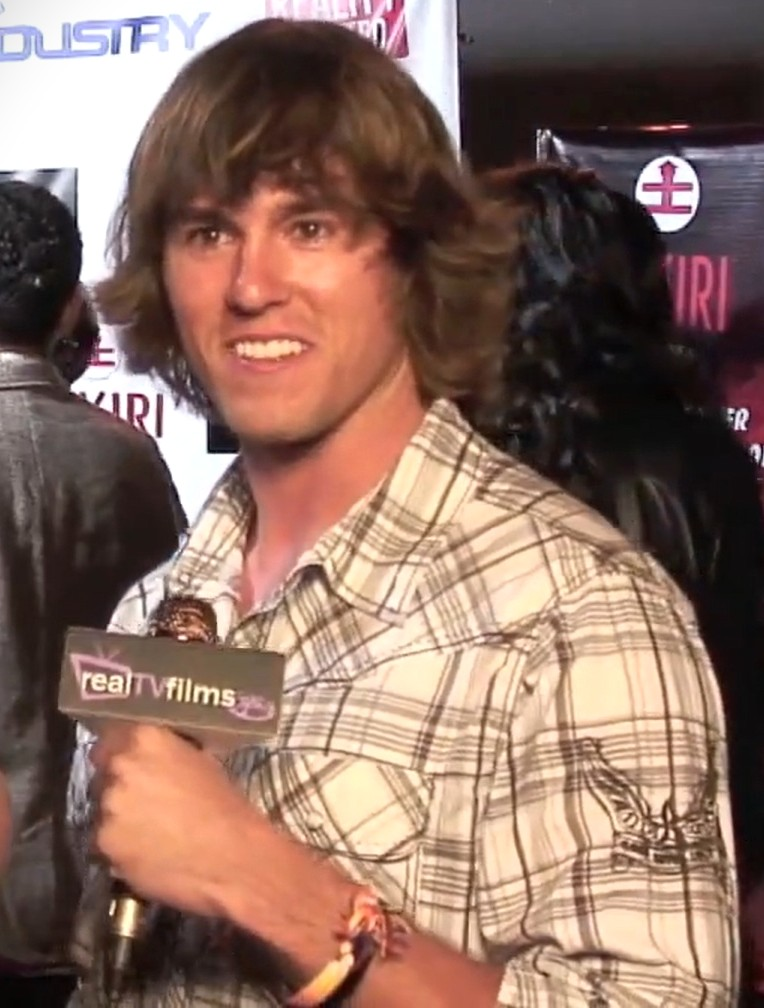
Hayden Moss, Survivor: Blood vs Water

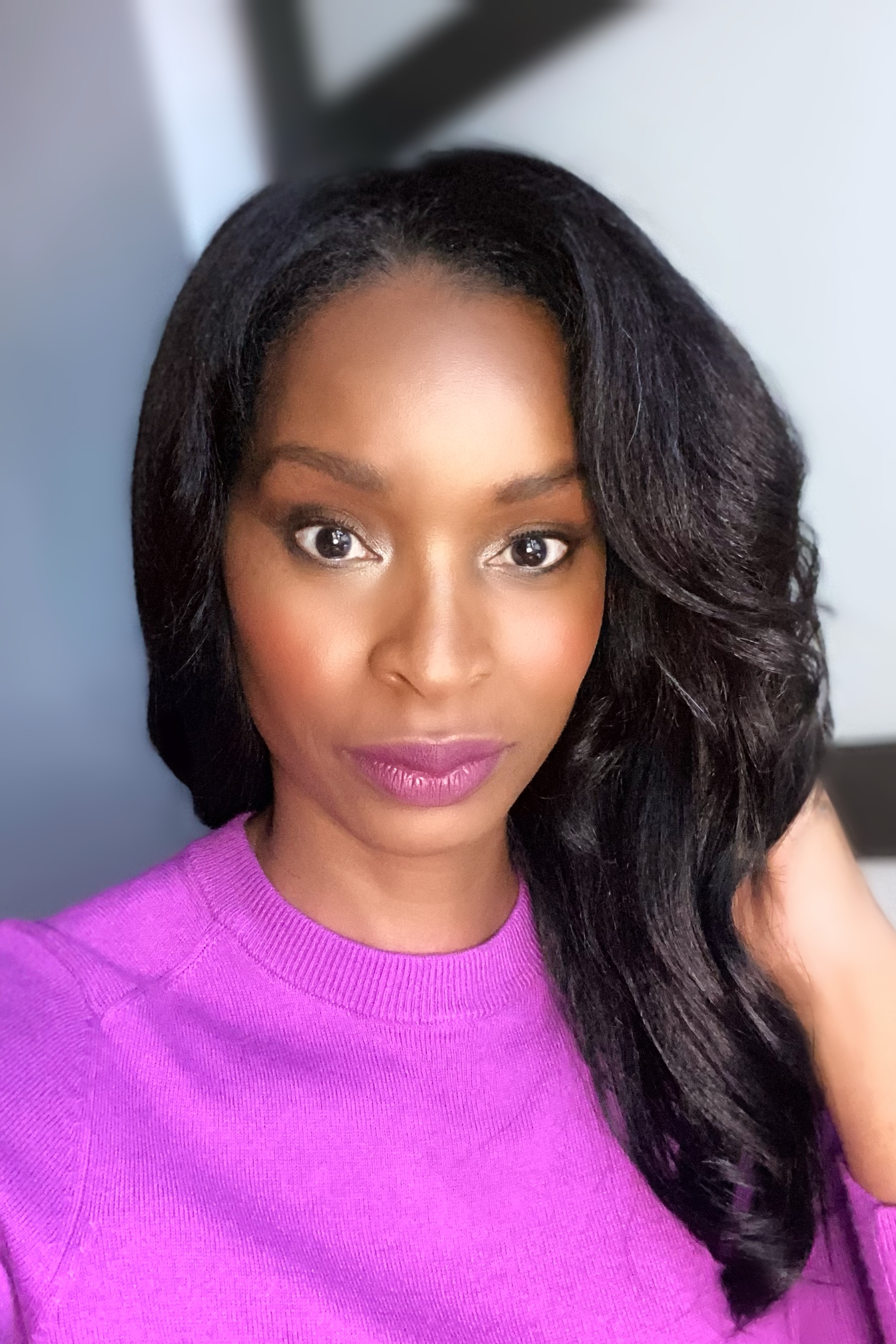
J'Tia Taylor, Survivor: Cagayan

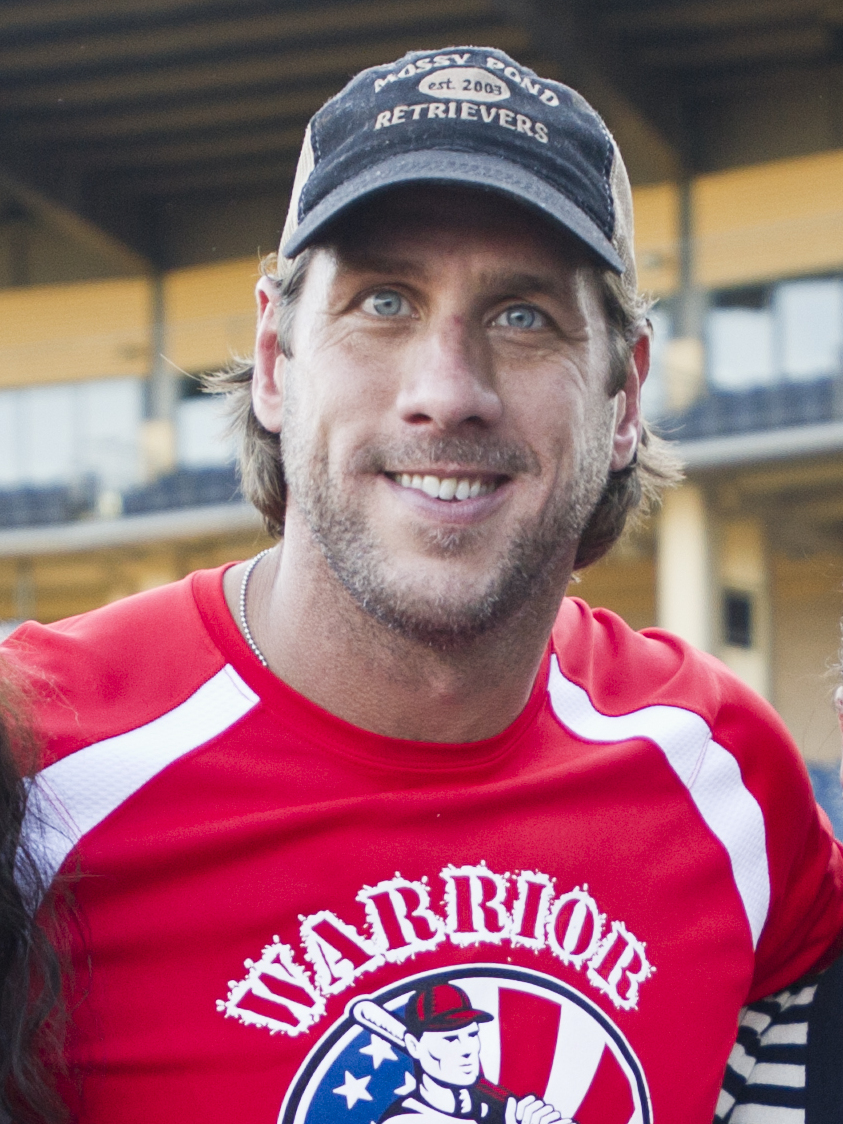
John Rocker, Survivor: San Juan del Sur

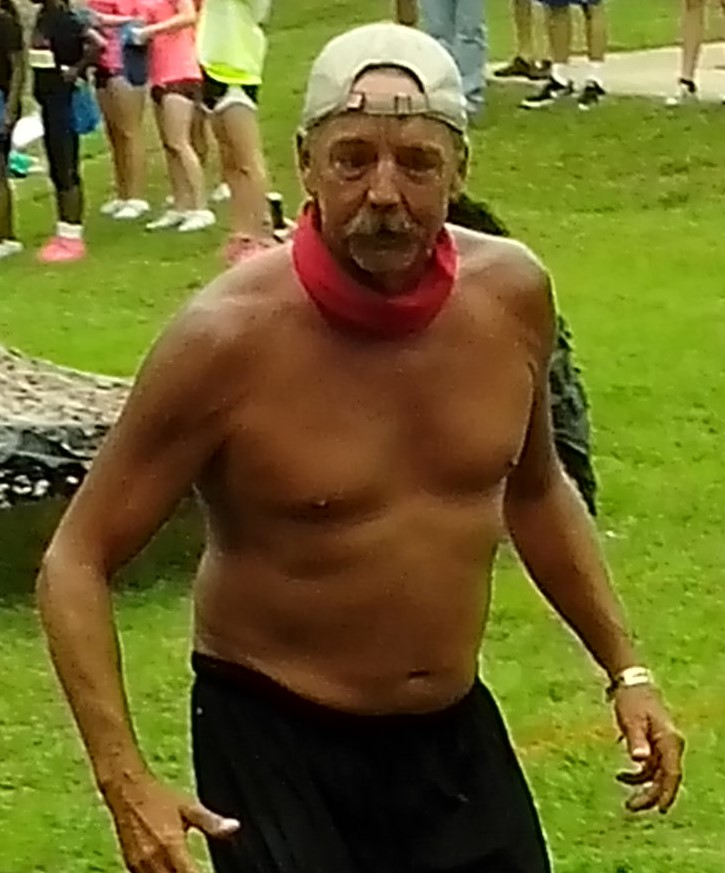
Keith Nale, Survivor: San Juan del Sur and Survivor: Cambodia

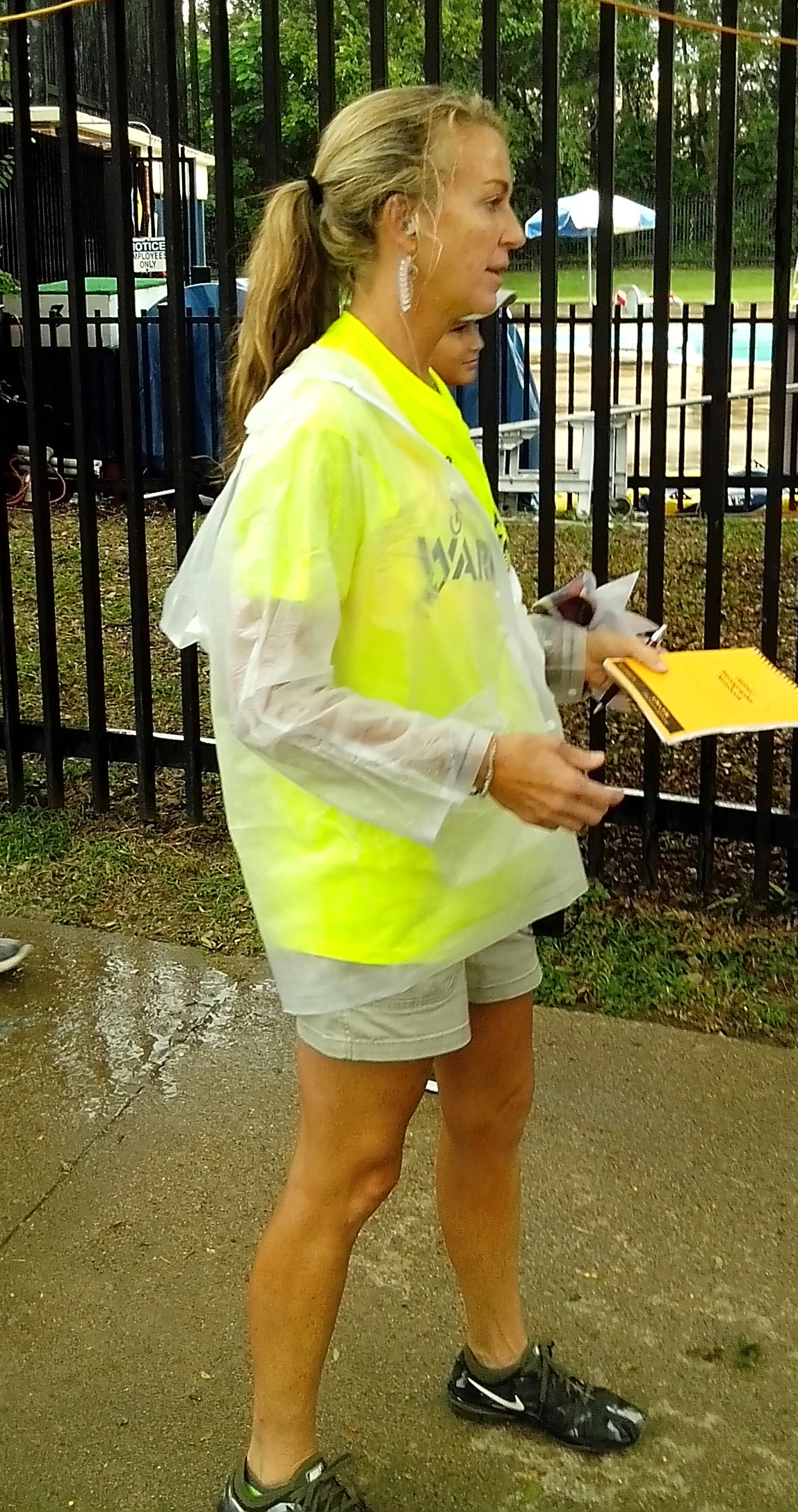
Missy Payne, Survivor: San Juan del Sur

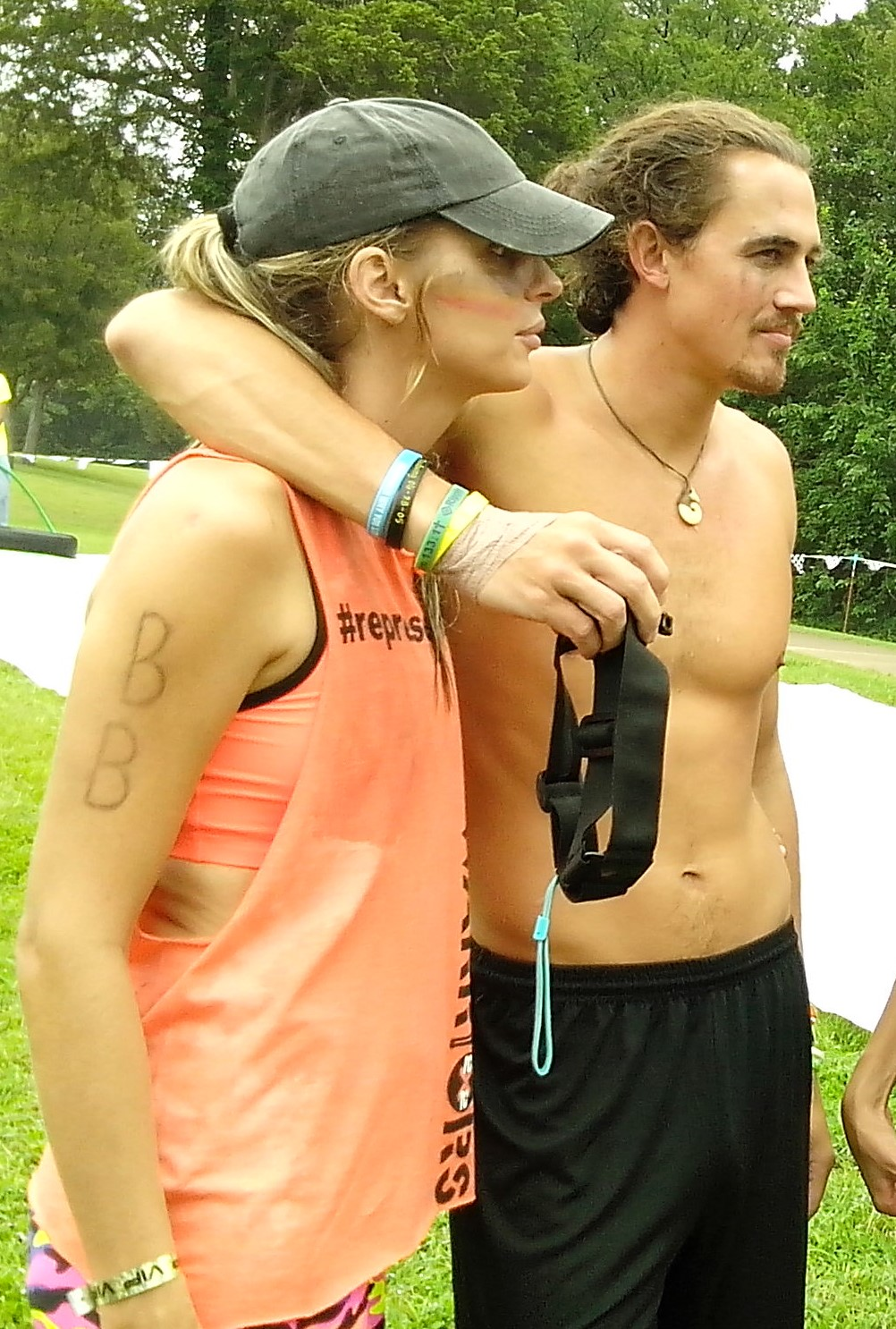
Sierra Dawn Thomas, Survivor: Worlds Apart and Survivor: Game Changers; and Joe Anglim, Survivor: Worlds Apart, Survivor: Cambodia and Survivor: Edge of Extinction

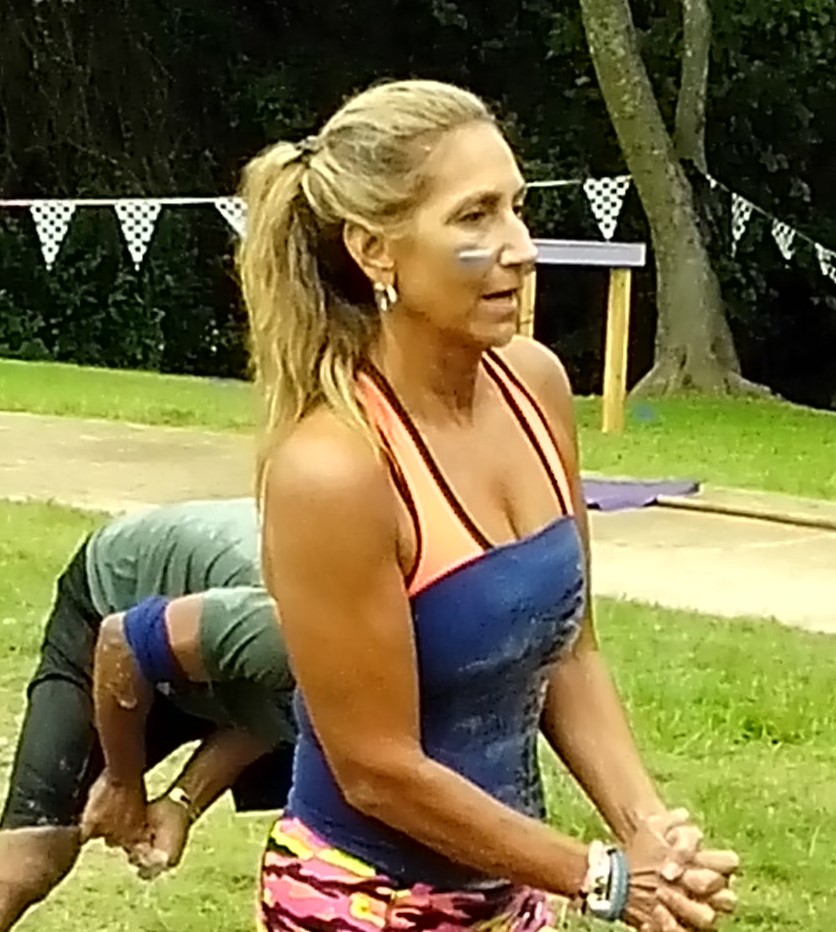
Carolyn Rivera, Survivor: Worlds Apart

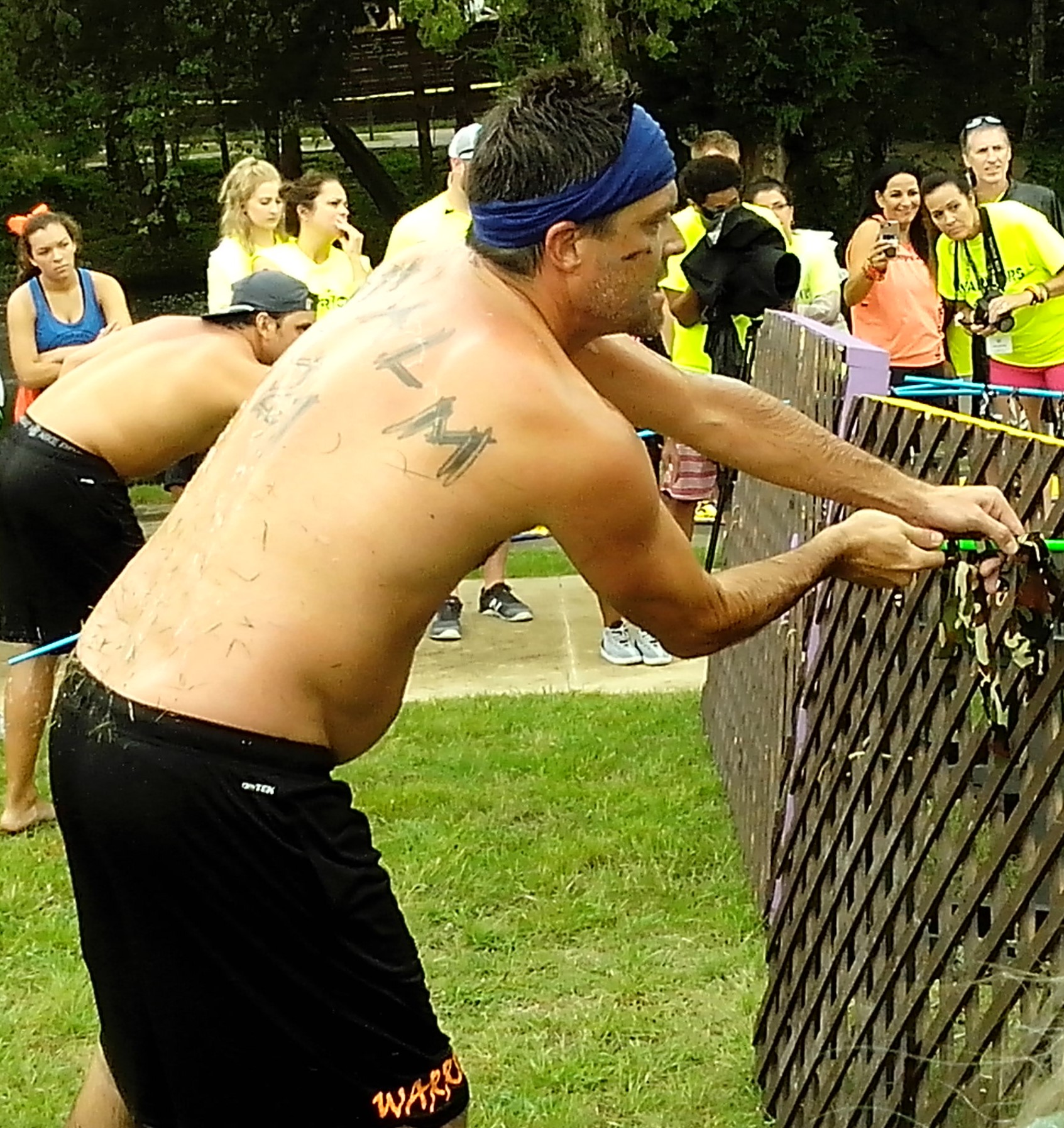
Mike Holloway, Survivor: Worlds Apart

All information is accurate as of the time the season was filmed, and thus may vary from season to season for returning players.

Name	Age	Hometown	Profession	Season	Finish
Wendy Jo DeSmidt-Kohlhoff	48	Fromberg, MT	Goat Rancher	Survivor: Nicaragua	20th
Shannon Elkins	30	Lafayette, LA	Pest Control Company Owner	Survivor: Nicaragua	19th
Jimmy Johnson	67	Islamorada, FL	Former NFL Coach	Survivor: Nicaragua	18th
Jimmy Tarantino	48	Gloucester, MA	Commercial Fisherman	Survivor: Nicaragua	17th
Tyrone Davis	42	Inglewood, CA	Firefighter	Survivor: Nicaragua	16th
Kelly Bruno	26	Durham, NC	Medical Student	Survivor: Nicaragua	15th
Yvette "Yve" Rojas	41	Kansas City, MO	Homemaker	Survivor: Nicaragua	14th
Jill Behm	43	Erie, PA	ER Doctor	Survivor: Nicaragua	13th
Alina Wilson	23	Downey, CA	Art Student	Survivor: Nicaragua	12th
Marty Piombo	48	Mill Valley, CA	Technology Executive	Survivor: Nicaragua	11th
Brenda Lowe	27	Miami, FL	Paddleboard Company Owner	Survivor: Nicaragua	10th
NaOnka Mixon	27	Los Angeles, CA	P.E. Teacher	Survivor: Nicaragua	9th
Kelly Shinn	20	Mesa, AZ	Nursing Student	Survivor: Nicaragua	8th
Ben "Benry" Henry	24	Los Angeles, CA	Club Promoter	Survivor: Nicaragua	7th
Jane Bright	56	Jackson Springs, NC	Dog Trainer	Survivor: Nicaragua	6th
Dan Lembo	63	Watermill, NY	Real Estate Executive	Survivor: Nicaragua	5th
Holly Hoffman	44	Eureka, SD	Swim Coach	Survivor: Nicaragua	4th
Matthew "Sash" Lenahan	30	New York, NY	Real Estate Broker	Survivor: Nicaragua	2nd Runner-up
Chase Rice	24	Fairview, NC	Professional Racecar Jackman	Survivor: Nicaragua	Runner-up
Jud "Fabio" Birza	21	Venice, CA	Student	Survivor: Nicaragua	Winner
Francesca Hogi	36	Washington, DC	Attorney	Survivor: Redemption Island	18th
Russell Hantz^{◊}	38	Dayton, TX	Oil Company Owner	Survivor: Redemption Island	17th
Kristina Kell	46	Malibu, CA	Law Student	Survivor: Redemption Island	16th
Krista Klumpp	25	Columbia, SC	Pharmaceutical Representative	Survivor: Redemption Island	15th
Stephanie Valencia	26	Long Beach, CA	Waitress	Survivor: Redemption Island	14th
Sarita White	36	Santa Monica, CA	Visual Effects Producer	Survivor: Redemption Island	13th
David Murphy	31	West Hollywood, CA	Defense Attorney	Survivor: Redemption Island	12th
Julie Wolfe	50	Oceanside, CA	Firefighter	Survivor: Redemption Island	11th
Steve Wright	51	Huntington Beach, CA	Ex-NFL Player	Survivor: Redemption Island	10th
Ralph Kiser	45	Lebanon, VA	Farmer	Survivor: Redemption Island	9th
Grant Mattos	29	West Hollywood, CA	Ex-NFL Player	Survivor: Redemption Island	8th
Matt Elrod	22	Nashville, TN	Pre-Med Student	Survivor: Redemption Island	7th
Mike Chiesl	31	Del Mar, CA	Iraq War Veteran	Survivor: Redemption Island	6th
Andrea Boehlke	21	Random Lake, WI	Student	Survivor: Redemption Island	5th
Ashley Underwood	25	Benton, ME	Nurse	Survivor: Redemption Island	4th
Natalie Tenerelli	19	Acton, CA	Professional Dancer	Survivor: Redemption Island	2nd Runner-up
Phillip Sheppard	52	Santa Monica, CA	Former Federal Agent?	Survivor: Redemption Island	Runner-up
Rob Mariano^{o}	34	Pensacola, FL	Construction Worker	Survivor: Redemption Island	Winner
Semhar Tadesse	24	Los Angeles, CA	Spoken Word Artist	Survivor: South Pacific	18th
Mark "Papa Bear" Caruso	48	Forest Hills, NY	Retired NYPD Detective	Survivor: South Pacific	17th
Stacey Powell	44	Grand Prairie, TX	Mortician	Survivor: South Pacific	16th
Elyse Umemoto	27	Las Vegas, NV	Dance Team Manager	Survivor: South Pacific	15th
Mikayla Wingle	22	Tampa, FL	Lingerie Football Player	Survivor: South Pacific	14th
Christine Shields-Markoski	39	Merrick, NY	Teacher	Survivor: South Pacific	13th
Jim Rice	35	Denver, CO	Medical Marijuana Dispenser	Survivor: South Pacific	12th
Keith Tollefson	26	Edina, MN	Water Treatment Technician	Survivor: South Pacific	11th
Dawn Meehan	41	South Jordan, UT	English Professor	Survivor: South Pacific	10th
Whitney Duncan	26	Nashville, TN	Country Music Singer	Survivor: South Pacific	9th
John Cochran	24	Washington, D.C.	Harvard Law Student	Survivor: South Pacific	8th
Edna Ma	35	Los Angeles, CA	Anesthesiologist	Survivor: South Pacific	7th
Brandon Hantz	19	Katy, TX	Oil Tanker Crewman	Survivor: South Pacific	6th
Rick Nelson	51	Aurora, UT	Rancher	Survivor: South Pacific	5th
Ozzy Lusth^{◊}	30	Venice, CA	Photographer	Survivor: South Pacific	4th
Albert Destrade	26	Plantation, FL	Baseball/Dating Coach	Survivor: South Pacific	2nd Runner-up
Benjamin "Coach" Wade^{◊}	39	Susanville, CA	Soccer Coach/Musician	Survivor: South Pacific	Runner-up
Sophie Clarke	22	Willsboro, NY	Medical Student	Survivor: South Pacific	Winner
Kourtney Moon	29	Austin, TX	Motorcycle Repairwoman	Survivor: One World	18th
Nina Acosta	51	Clovis, CA	Retired LAPD Officer	Survivor: One World	17th
Matt Quinlan	33	San Francisco, CA	Attorney	Survivor: One World	16th
Bill Posley	28	Venice, CA	Stand-Up Comedian	Survivor: One World	15th
Monica Culpepper	41	Tampa, FL	Ex-NFL Player's Wife	Survivor: One World	14th
Colton Cumbie	21	Monroeville, AL	Student	Survivor: One World	13th
Jonas Otsuji	37	Lehi, UT	Sushi Chef	Survivor: One World	12th
Michael Jefferson	30	Seattle, WA	Banker	Survivor: One World	11th
Jay Byars	25	Gaffney, SC	Model	Survivor: One World	10th
Leif Manson	27	San Diego, CA	Phlebotomist	Survivor: One World	9th
Troy "Troyzan" Robertson	50	Miami, FL	Swimsuit Photographer	Survivor: One World	8th
Kat Edorsson	22	Orlando, FL	Timeshare Representative	Survivor: One World	7th
Greg "Tarzan" Smith	64	Houston, TX	Plastic Surgeon	Survivor: One World	6th
Alicia Rosa	25	Chicago, IL	Special Education Teacher	Survivor: One World	5th
Christina Cha	29	West Hollywood, CA	Career Consultant	Survivor: One World	4th
Chelsea Meissner	26	Charleston, SC	Medical Saleswoman	Survivor: One World	2nd Runner-up
Sabrina Thompson	33	Brooklyn, NY	High School Teacher	Survivor: One World	Runner-up
Kim Spradlin	29	San Antonio, TX	Bridal Shop Owner	Survivor: One World	Winner
Zane Knight	28	Danville, VA	Tire Repairman	Survivor: Philippines	18th
Roxanne "Roxy" Morris	28	Brooklyn, NY	Seminary Student	Survivor: Philippines	17th
Angie Layton	20	Provo, UT	Model/Student	Survivor: Philippines	16th
Russell Swan^{^}	45	Glenside, PA	Attorney	Survivor: Philippines	15th
Dana Lambert	32	Winston-Salem, NC	Cosmetologist	Survivor: Philippines	14th
Sarah Dawson	28	Silver Spring, MD	Insurance Saleswoman	Survivor: Philippines	13th
Katie Hanson	22	Newark, DE	Former Miss Delaware	Survivor: Philippines	12th
Roberta "R.C." Saint-Amour	27	New York, NY	Investment Banker	Survivor: Philippines	11th
Jeff Kent	44	Austin, TX	Former MLB Player	Survivor: Philippines	10th
Artis Silvester	53	Terrytown, LA	Computer Engineer	Survivor: Philippines	9th
Peter "Pete" Yurkowski	24	Holmdel, NJ	Engineer Graduate/Model	Survivor: Philippines	8th
Jonathan Penner^{◊}	50	Los Angeles, CA	Writer	Survivor: Philippines	7th
Carter Williams	24	Shawnee, KS	Track Coach	Survivor: Philippines	6th
Abi-Maria Gomes	32	Los Angeles, CA	Business Student	Survivor: Philippines	5th
Malcolm Freberg	25	Hermosa Beach, CA	Bartender	Survivor: Philippines	4th
Lisa Whelchel	49	Dallas, TX	Former TV Teen Star	Survivor: Philippines	Co-runner up
Michael Skupin^{^}	50	White Lake, MI	Professional Speaker	Survivor: Philippines	Co-runner up
Denise Stapley	41	Cedar Rapids, IA	Sex Therapist	Survivor: Philippines	Winner
Francesca Hogi^{^}	38	Brooklyn, NY	Attorney	Survivor: Caramoan	20th
Alexandra "Allie" Pohevitz	25	Oceanside, NY	Bartender	Survivor: Caramoan	19th
Hope Driskill	23	Jefferson City, MO	Pre-Law Student	Survivor: Caramoan	18th
Shamar Thomas	27	Brooklyn, NY	Iraq War Veteran	Survivor: Caramoan	17th
Laura Alexander	23	Washington DC	Administrative Officer	Survivor: Caramoan	16th
Brandon Hantz^{^}	21	Katy, TX	Chemical Disposal	Survivor: Caramoan	15th
Matt Bischoff	38	Cincinnati, OH	BMX Bike Salesman	Survivor: Caramoan	14th
Julia Landauer	21	Stanford, CA	Racecar Driver	Survivor: Caramoan	13th
Corinne Kaplan^{^}	33	Los Angeles, CA	Pharmaceutical Sales	Survivor: Caramoan	12th
Michael Snow	44	New York, NY	Event Planner	Survivor: Caramoan	11th
Phillip Sheppard^{^}	54	Santa Monica, CA	Software Sales	Survivor: Caramoan	10th
Malcolm Freberg^{^}	26	Hermosa Beach, CA	Bartender	Survivor: Caramoan	9th
Reynold Toepfer	30	San Francisco, CA	Real Estate Salesman	Survivor: Caramoan	8th
Andrea Boehlke^{^}	23	New York, NY	Entertainment Host and Writer	Survivor: Caramoan	7th
Brenda Lowe^{^}	30	Miami, FL	Paddleboard Company Owner	Survivor: Caramoan	6th
Erik Reichenbach^{^}	27	Santa Clarita, CA	Comic Book Artist	Survivor: Caramoan	5th
Edward "Eddie" Fox	23	East Brunswick, NJ	Fireman/EMT	Survivor: Caramoan	4th
Sherri Biethman	41	Boise, ID	Fast Food Franchisee	Survivor: Caramoan	Co-runner up
Dawn Meehan^{^}	42	South Jordan, UT	English professor	Survivor: Caramoan	Co-runner up
John Cochran^{^}	25	Washington DC	Harvard Law Student	Survivor: Caramoan	Winner
Rupert Boneham^{o}	49	Indianapolis, IN	Troubled Teens Mentor	Survivor: Blood vs. Water	20th
Colton Cumbie^{^}	22	Monroeville, AL	Student Teacher	Survivor: Blood vs. Water	19th
Rachel Foulger	33	Orem, UT	Cocktail Waitress/Graphic Designer	Survivor: Blood vs. Water	18th
Marissa Peterson	21	Chapel Hill, NC	Student	Survivor: Blood vs. Water	17th
Candice Cody^{◊}	30	Washington DC	Physician	Survivor: Blood vs. Water	16th
Brad Culpepper	44	Tampa, FL	Attorney/Retired NFL Player	Survivor: Blood vs. Water	15th
Kat Edorsson^{^}	23	Orlando, FL	Full-Time Student/Sales	Survivor: Blood vs. Water	14th
John Cody	30	Washington DC	Physician/Army Orthopedic Surgery Resident	Survivor: Blood vs. Water	13th
Laura Boneham	44	Indianapolis, IN	Merchandiser	Survivor: Blood vs. Water	12th
Aras Baskauskas^{^}	31	Santa Monica, CA	Musician	Survivor: Blood vs. Water	11th
Vytas Baskauskas	33	Santa Monica, CA	Yoga Instructor/Math Instructor	Survivor: Blood vs. Water	10th
Caleb Bankston	26	Crossville, AL	Post Office Manager/Farmer	Survivor: Blood vs. Water	9th
Katie Collins	25	New York, NY	Hedge Fund Support	Survivor: Blood vs. Water	8th
Hayden Moss	27	Tempe, AZ	Real Estate	Survivor: Blood vs. Water	7th
Laura Morett^{^}	43	Salem, OR	Fitness Instructor	Survivor: Blood vs. Water	6th
Ciera Eastin	24	Salem, OR	Cosmetology Student	Survivor: Blood vs. Water	5th
Tina Wesson^{◊}	52	Knoxville, TN	Motivational Speaker	Survivor: Blood vs. Water	4th
Gervase Peterson^{^}	43	Willingboro, NJ	Cigar Lounge Owner	Survivor: Blood vs. Water	2nd Runner-up
Monica Culpepper^{^}	42	Tampa, FL	Homemaker	Survivor: Blood vs. Water	Runner-up
Tyson Apostol^{◊}	34	Heber, UT	Former Pro Cyclist/Shop Manager	Survivor: Blood vs. Water	Winner
David Samson	45	Plantation, FL	Miami Marlins President	Survivor: Cagayan	18th
Garrett Adelstein	27	Santa Monica, CA	Professional Poker Player	Survivor: Cagayan	17th
Brice Johnston	27	Center City Philadelphia, PA	Social Worker	Survivor: Cagayan	16th
J'Tia Taylor	31	Chicago, IL	Nuclear Engineer	Survivor: Cagayan	15th
Cliff Robinson	46	Newark, NJ	Former NBA All-Star	Survivor: Cagayan	14th
Lindsey Ogle	29	Kokomo, IN	Hairstylist	Survivor: Cagayan	13th
Alexis Maxwell	21	Addison, IL	Student	Survivor: Cagayan	12th
Sarah Lacina	29	Cedar Rapids, IA	Police Officer	Survivor: Cagayan	11th
Morgan McLeod	21	San Jose, CA	Ex-NFL Cheerleader	Survivor: Cagayan	10th
Leon Joseph "LJ" McKanas	34	Boston, MA	Horse Trainer	Survivor: Cagayan	9th
Jeremiah Wood	34	Dobson, NC	Male Model	Survivor: Cagayan	8th
Jefra Bland	22	Campbellsville, KY	Miss Kentucky Teen USA	Survivor: Cagayan	7th
Latasha "Tasha" Fox	37	St. Louis, MO	Accountant	Survivor: Cagayan	6th
Trish Hegarty	48	Needham, MA	Pilates Teacher	Survivor: Cagayan	5th
Spencer Bledsoe	21	Chicago, IL	Economics Student	Survivor: Cagayan	4th
Kassandra "Kass" McQuillen	41	Tehachapi, CA	Attorney	Survivor: Cagayan	3rd
Yung "Woo" Hwang	29	Newport Beach, CA	Martial Arts Instructor	Survivor: Cagayan	Runner-up
Tony Vlachos	39	Jersey City, NJ	Police Officer	Survivor: Cagayan	Winner
Nadiya Anderson	28	Edgewater, NJ	Crossfit Coach/Project Coordinator	Survivor: San Juan del Sur	18th
Val Collins	35	Foxborough, MA	Police Officer	Survivor: San Juan del Sur	17th
John Rocker	39	Atlanta, GA	Former MLB Player	Survivor: San Juan del Sur	16th
Drew Christy	25	Winter Park, FL	Traveling Sales Representative	Survivor: San Juan del Sur	15th
Kelley Wentworth	28	Seattle, WA	Marketing Manager	Survivor: San Juan del Sur	14th
Dale Wentworth	55	Ephrata, WA	Farmer	Survivor: San Juan del Sur	13th
Julie McGee	34	Atlanta, GA	Model/Spray Tan Business Owner	Survivor: San Juan del Sur	12th
Josh Canfield	32	New York, NY	Singer/Actor/Writer	Survivor: San Juan del Sur	11th
Jeremy Collins	36	Foxborough, MA	Firefighter	Survivor: San Juan del Sur	10th
Wes Nale	24	Shreveport, LA	Firefighter	Survivor: San Juan del Sur	9th
Reed Kelly	31	New York, NY	Broadway Performer/Model/Aerialist	Survivor: San Juan del Sur	8th
Alec Christy	22	Winter Park, FL	Student	Survivor: San Juan del Sur	7th
Jon Misch	26	Waterford, MI	Financial Assistant	Survivor: San Juan del Sur	6th
Baylor Wilson	20	Nashville, TN	Student	Survivor: San Juan del Sur	5th
Keith Nale	53	Shreveport, LA	Firefighter	Survivor: San Juan del Sur	4th
Missy Payne	47	Dallas, TX	Competitive Cheerleading Gym Owner	Survivor: San Juan del Sur	2nd Runner-up
Jaclyn Schultz	25	Wyandotte, MI	Media Buyer	Survivor: San Juan del Sur	Runner-up
Natalie Anderson	28	Edgewater, NJ	Crossfit Coach/Physical Therapy Student	Survivor: San Juan del Sur	Winner
Charlotte "So" Kim	31	Long Beach, CA	Retail Buyer	Survivor: Worlds Apart	18th
Vince Sly	32	Santa Monica, CA	Coconut Vendor	Survivor: Worlds Apart	17th
Nina Poersch	51	Palmdale, CA	Hearing Advocate	Survivor: Worlds Apart	16th
Lindsey Cascaddan	24	College Park, FL	Hairdresser	Survivor: Worlds Apart	15th
Max Dawson	37	Topanga, CA	Media Consultant	Survivor: Worlds Apart	14th
Joaquin Souberbielle	27	Valley Stream, NY	Marketing Director	Survivor: Worlds Apart	13th
Kelly Remington	44	Grand Island, NY	State Trooper	Survivor: Worlds Apart	12th
Hali Ford	25	San Francisco, CA	Law Student	Survivor: Worlds Apart	11th
Joe Anglim	25	Scottsdale, AZ	Jewelry Designer	Survivor: Worlds Apart	10th
Jenn Brown	22	Long Beach, CA	Sailing Instructor	Survivor: Worlds Apart	9th
Shirin Oskooi	31	San Francisco, CA	Yahoo! Executive	Survivor: Worlds Apart	8th
Tyler Fredrickson	33	Los Angeles, CA	Ex-Talent Agent Assistant	Survivor: Worlds Apart	7th
Dan Foley	47	Gorham, ME	Postal Worker	Survivor: Worlds Apart	6th
Sierra Dawn Thomas	27	Roy, UT	Barrel Racer	Survivor: Worlds Apart	5th
Rodney Lavoie, Jr.	24	Boston, MA	General Contractor	Survivor: Worlds Apart	4th
Will Sims II	41	Sherman Oaks, CA	YouTube Sensation	Survivor: Worlds Apart	Co-runner up
Carolyn Rivera	52	Tampa, FL	Corporate Executive	Survivor: Worlds Apart	Co-runner up
Mike Holloway	38	North Richland Hills, TX	Oil Driller	Survivor: Worlds Apart	Winner

== Seasons 31–40 (2015–2020) ==
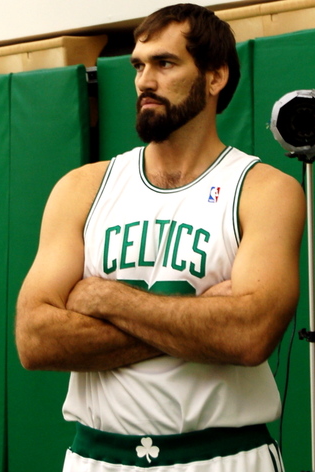
Scot Pollard, Survivor: Kaôh Rōng

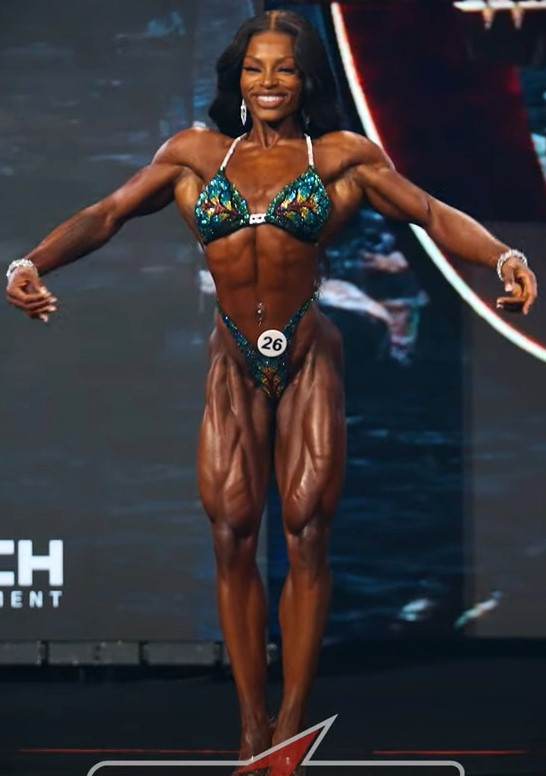
Cydney Gillon, Survivor: Kaôh Rōng

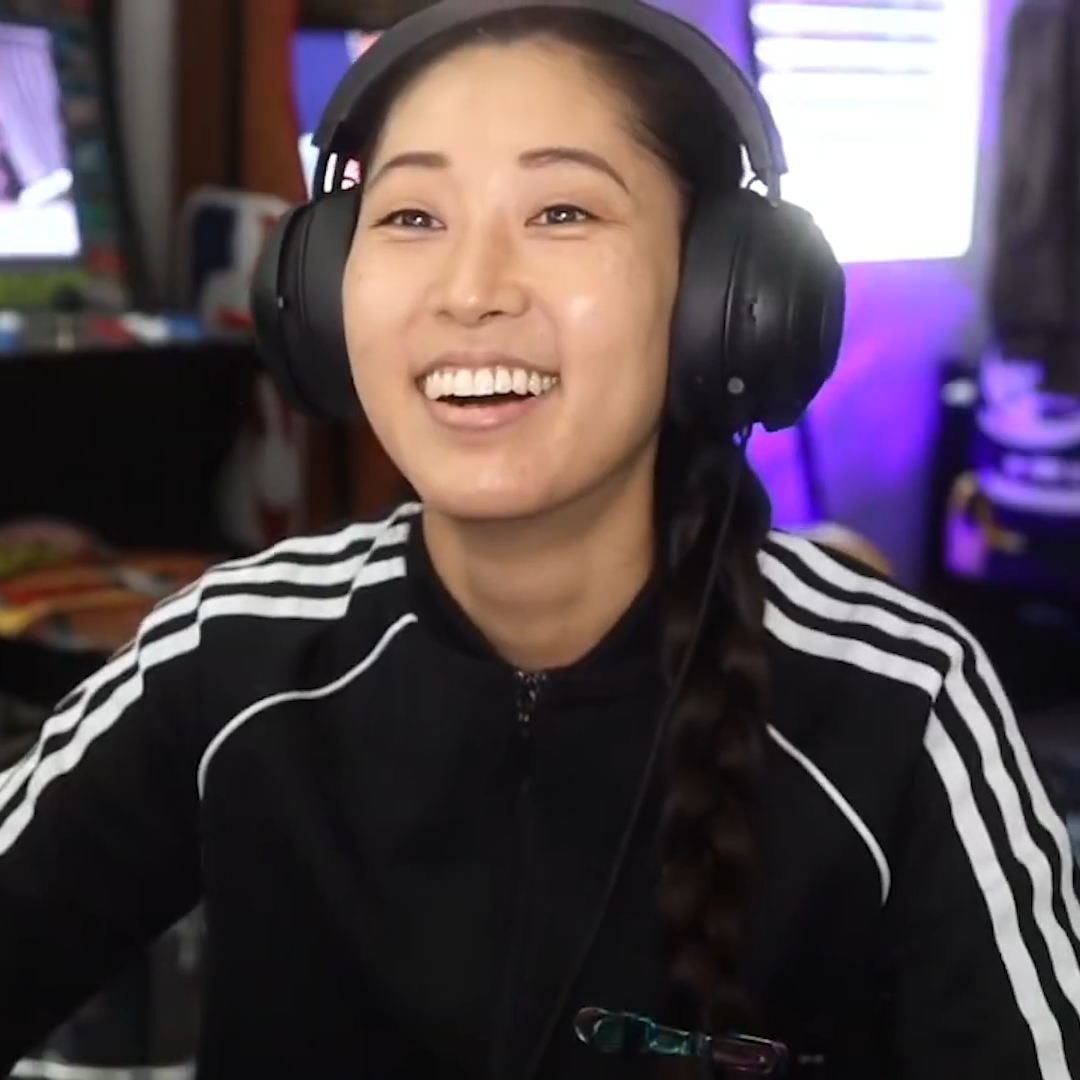
Mari Takahashi, Survivor: Millennials vs. Gen X

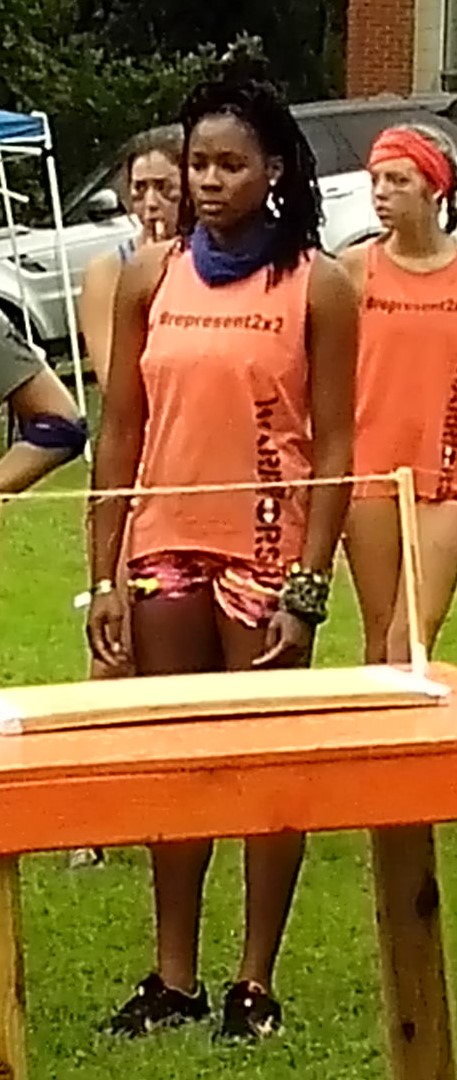
Michaela Bradshaw, Survivor: Millennials vs. Gen X and Survivor: Game Changers

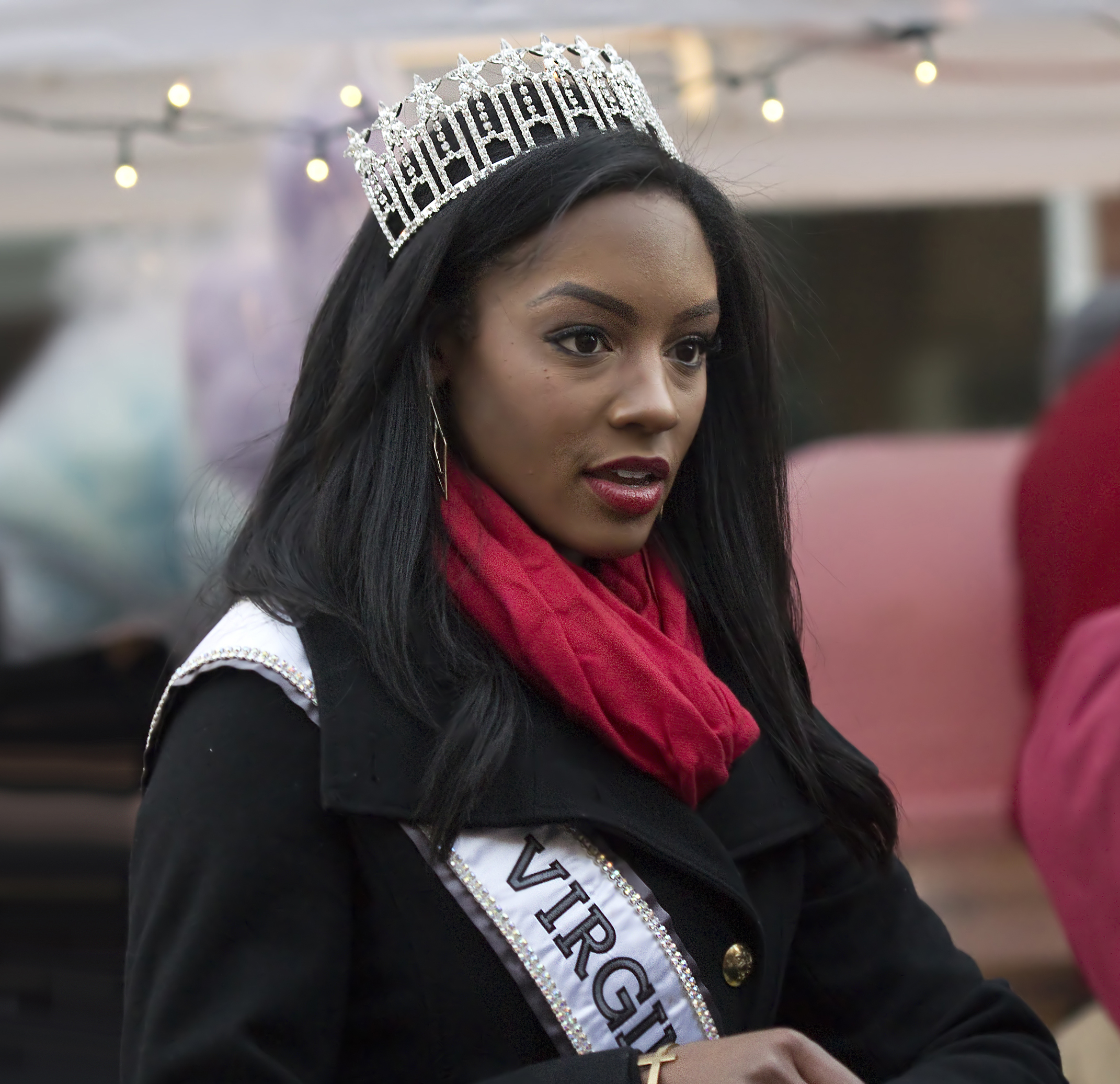
Desiree "Desi" Williams, Survivor: Heroes vs. Healers vs. Hustlers

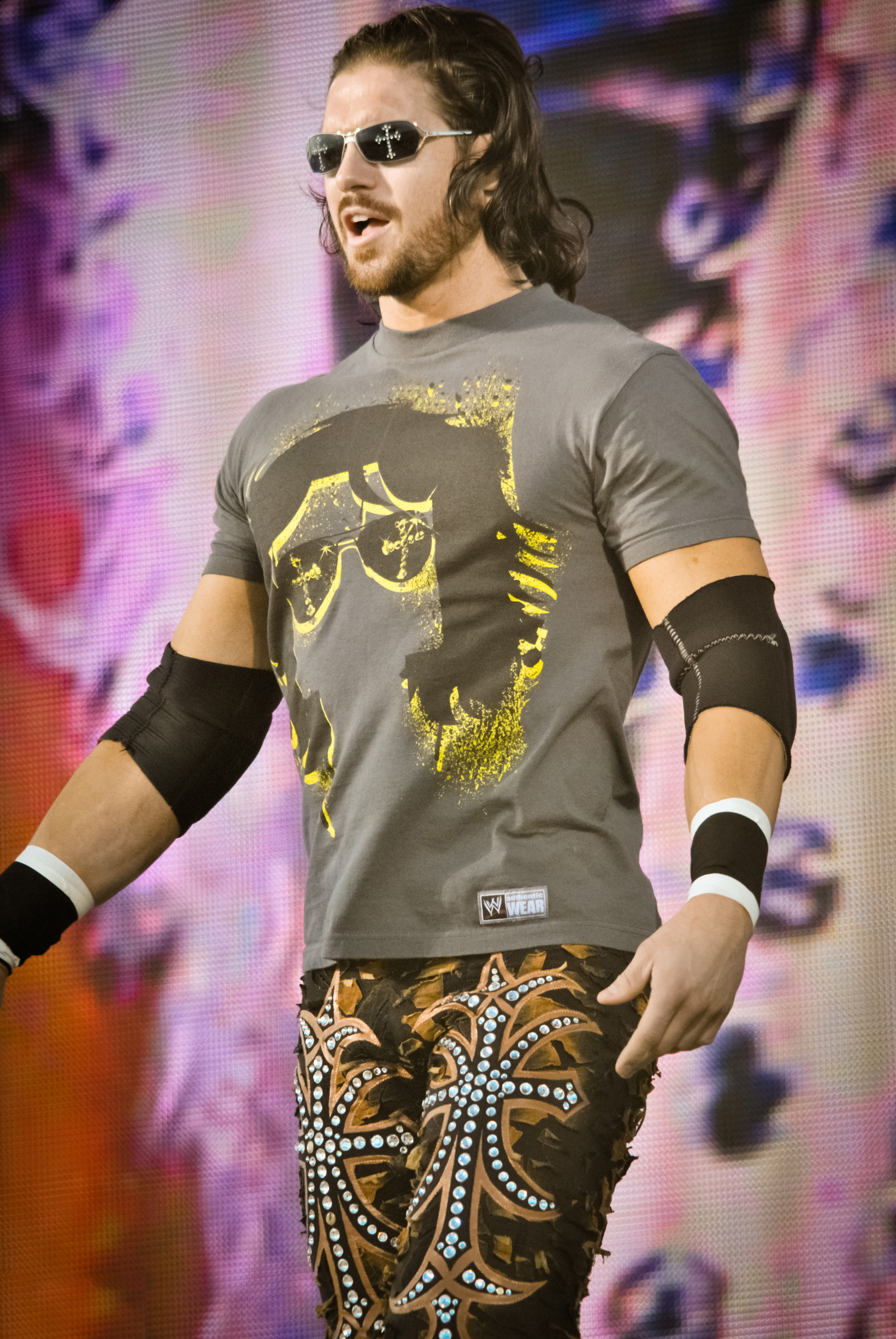
John Hennigan, Survivor: David vs. Goliath

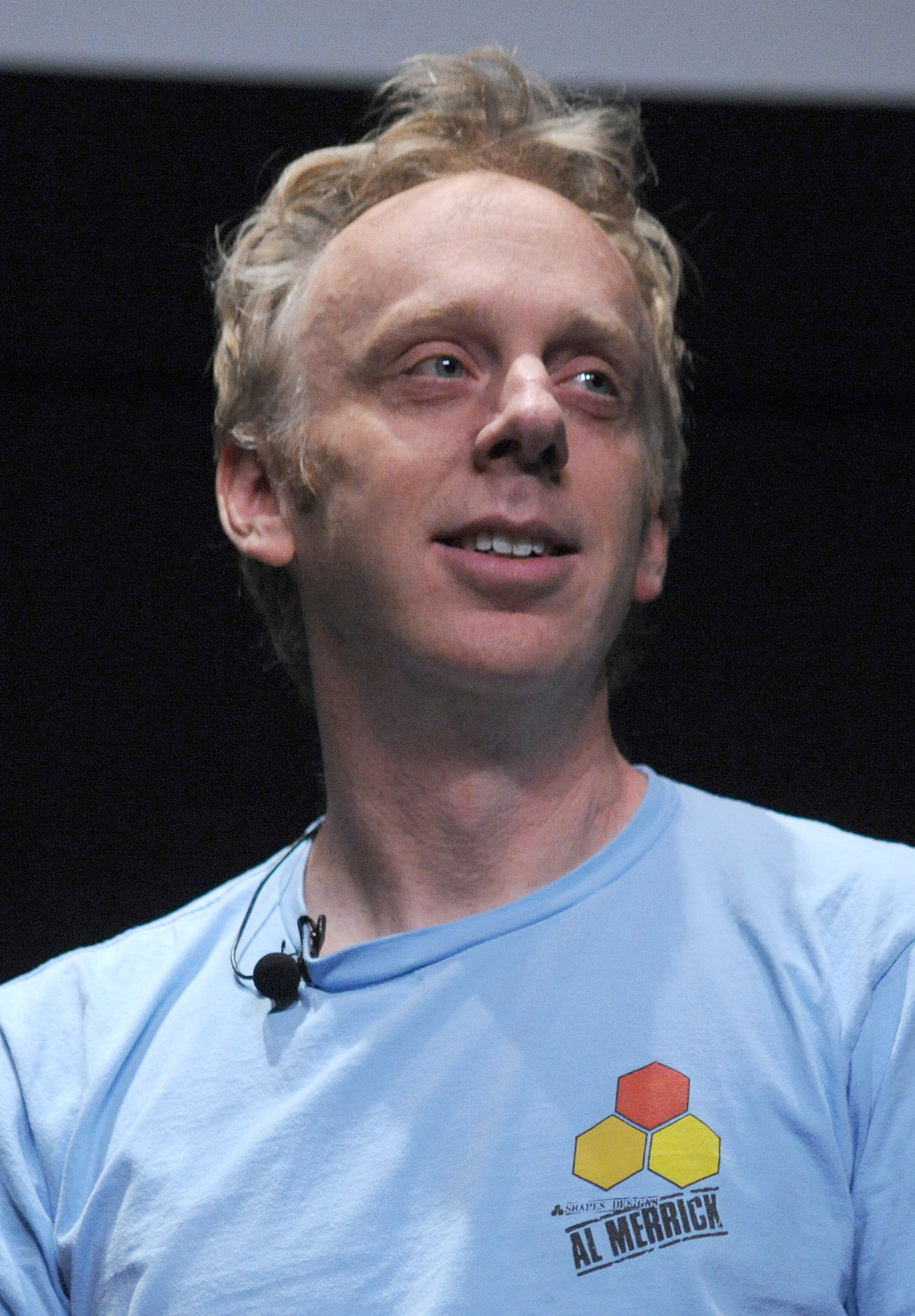
Mike White, Survivor: David vs. Goliath and Survivor 50: In the Hands of the Fans

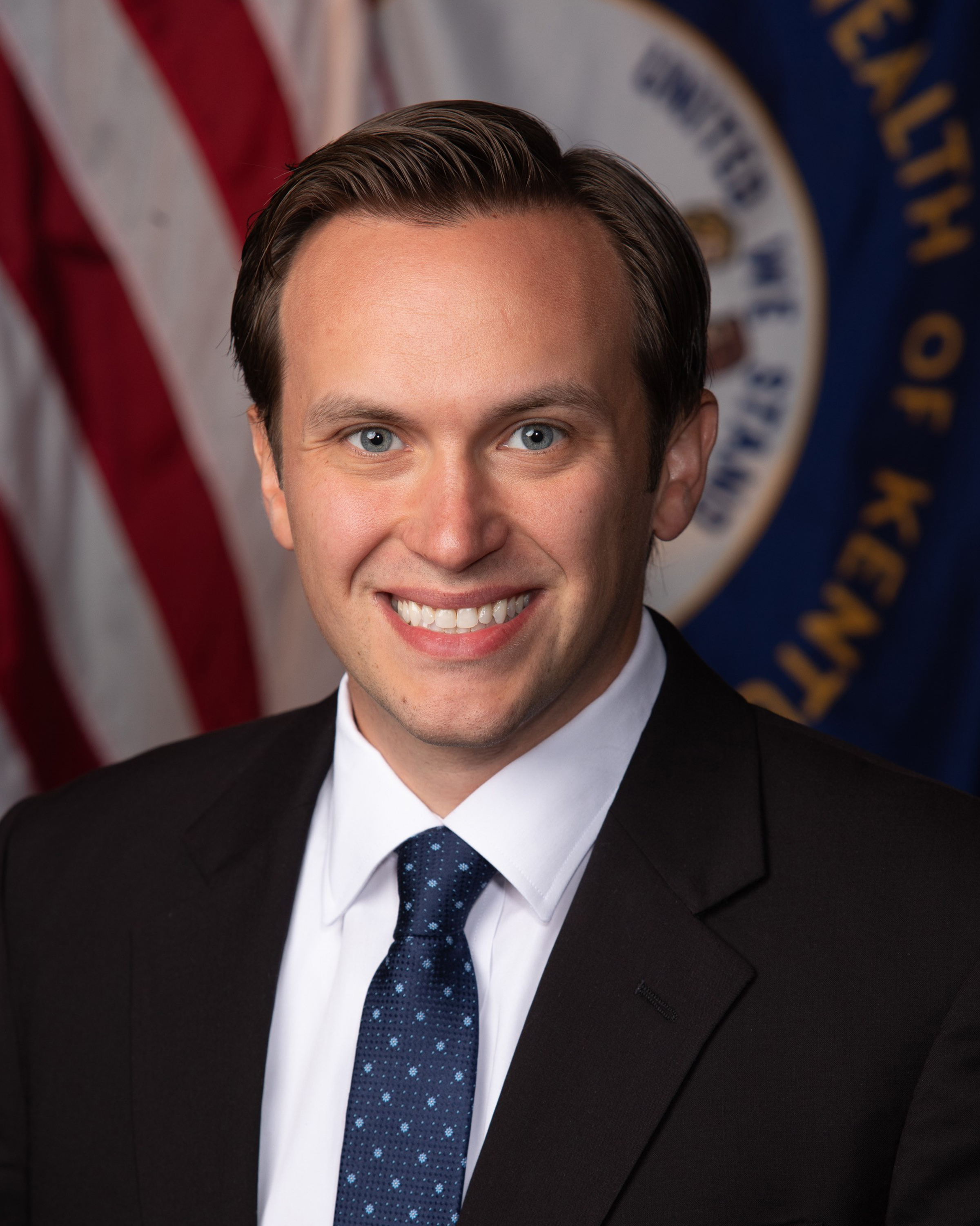
Nick Wilson, Survivor: David vs. Goliath and Survivor: Winners at War

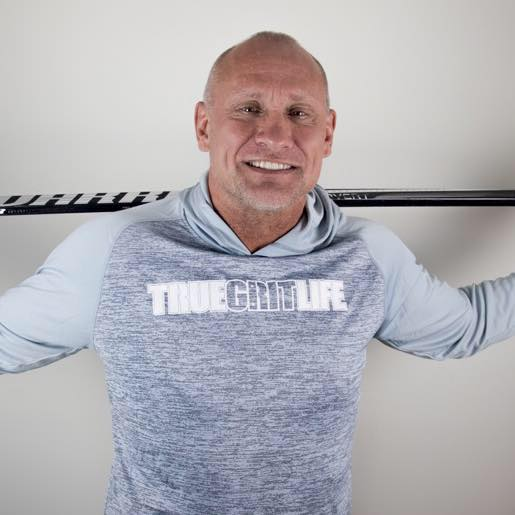
Tom Laidlaw, Survivor: Island of the Idols

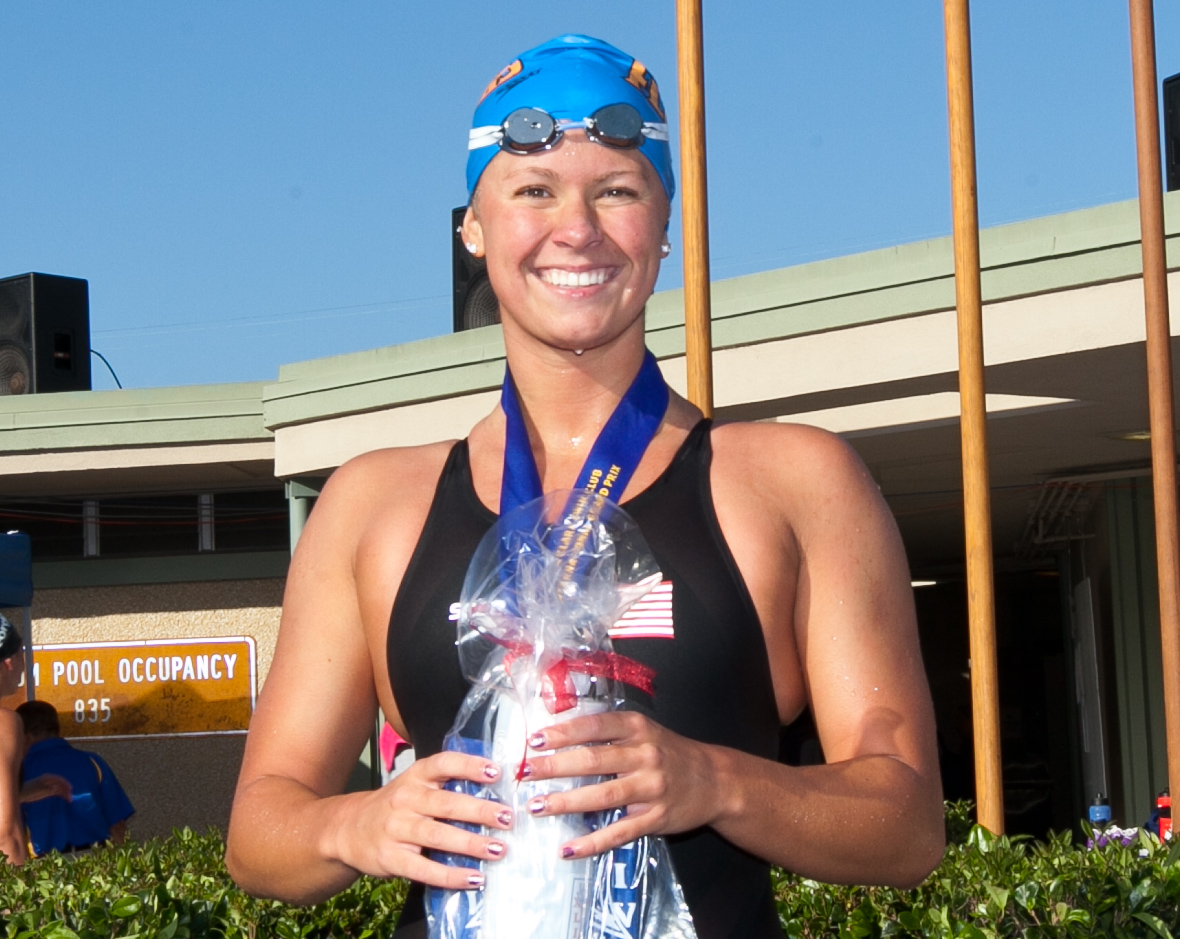
Elizabeth Beisel, Survivor: Island of the Idols

All information is accurate as of the time the season was filmed, and thus may vary from season to season for returning players.

Name	Age	Hometown	Profession	Season	Finish
Vytas Baskauskas^{^}	35	Santa Monica, CA	Yoga Instructor/Math Professor	Survivor: Cambodia	20th
Shirin Oskooi^{^}	32	San Francisco, CA	Yahoo! Executive	Survivor: Cambodia	19th
Peih-Gee Law^{^}	37	San Francisco, CA	Jeweler	Survivor: Cambodia	18th
Jeff Varner^{^}	49	Greensboro, NC	Internet Projects Manager	Survivor: Cambodia	17th
Monica Padilla^{^}	30	Queens, NY	Law Student	Survivor: Cambodia	16th
Terry Deitz^{^}	55	Simsbury, CT	Pilot	Survivor: Cambodia	15th
Yung "Woo" Hwang^{^}	31	Newport Beach, CA	Martial Arts Instructor	Survivor: Cambodia	14th
Kassandra "Kass" McQuillen^{^}	42	Tehachapi, CA	Attorney	Survivor: Cambodia	13th
Andrew Savage^{^}	51	San Jose, CA	Attorney	Survivor: Cambodia	12th
Kelly Wiglesworth^{^}	37	Greensboro, NC	River Guide	Survivor: Cambodia	11th
Ciera Eastin^{^}	26	Salem, OR	Cosmetology Student	Survivor: Cambodia	10th
Stephen Fishbach^{^}	36	New York NY	Corporate Consultant	Survivor: Cambodia	9th
Joe Anglim^{^}	25	Scottsdale, AZ	Jewelry Designer	Survivor: Cambodia	8th
Abi-Maria Gomes^{^}	35	Los Angeles, CA	Business Student	Survivor: Cambodia	7th
Kimmi Kappenberg^{^}	42	The Woodlands, TX	Bartender	Survivor: Cambodia	6th
Keith Nale^{^}	54	Keithville, LA	Firefighter	Survivor: Cambodia	5th
Kelley Wentworth^{^}	29	Seattle, WA	Marketing Manager	Survivor: Cambodia	4th
Spencer Bledsoe^{^}	22	Chicago, IL	Economics Student	Survivor: Cambodia	Co-runner up
Latasha "Tasha" Fox^{^}	39	St. Louis, MO	Accountant	Survivor: Cambodia	Co-runner up
Jeremy Collins^{^}	37	Foxborough, MA	Firefighter	Survivor: Cambodia	Winner
Darnell Hamilton	27	Chicago, IL	Postal Worker	Survivor: Kaôh Rōng	18th
Jennifer Lanzetti	38	Salt Lake City, UT	Contractor	Survivor: Kaôh Rōng	17th
Elisabeth "Liz" Markham	27	Brooklyn, NY	Quantitative Strategist	Survivor: Kaôh Rōng	16th
Caleb Reynolds	28	Hopkinsville, KY	Army Veteran	Survivor: Kaôh Rōng	15th
Alecia Holden	24	Dallas, TX	Real Estate Agent	Survivor: Kaôh Rōng	14th
Anna Khait	26	Brooklyn, NY	Professional Poker Player	Survivor: Kaôh Rōng	13th
Peter Baggenstos	34	Minneapolis, MN	ER Doctor	Survivor: Kaôh Rōng	12th
Neal Gottlieb	38	Sausalito, CA	Ice Cream Entrepreneur	Survivor: Kaôh Rōng	11th
Nick Maiorano	30	Redondo Beach, CA	Personal Trainer	Survivor: Kaôh Rōng	10th
Debbie Wanner	49	Reading, PA	Chemist	Survivor: Kaôh Rōng	9th
Scot Pollard	40	Carmel, IN	Former NBA Player	Survivor: Kaôh Rōng	8th
Julia Sokolowski	19	Boston, MA	College Student	Survivor: Kaôh Rōng	7th
Kyle Jason	31	Detroit, MI	Bounty Hunter	Survivor: Kaôh Rōng	6th
Joe Del Campo	71	Vero Beach, FL	Former FBI Agent	Survivor: Kaôh Rōng	5th
Cydney Gillon	23	Douglasville, GA	Bodybuilder	Survivor: Kaôh Rōng	4th
Tai Trang	51	San Francisco, CA	Gardener	Survivor: Kaôh Rōng	2nd Runner-up
Aubry Bracco	29	Cambridge, MA	Social Media Marketer	Survivor: Kaôh Rōng	Runner-up
Michele Fitzgerald	24	Freehold, NJ	Bartender	Survivor: Kaôh Rōng	Winner
Rachel Ako	37	Los Angeles, CA	Recruiting Director	Survivor: Millennials vs. Gen X	20th
Mari Takahashi	31	Los Angeles, CA	Gamer	Survivor: Millennials vs. Gen X	19th
Paul Wachter	52	Sugarloaf Key, FL	Boat Mechanic	Survivor: Millennials vs. Gen X	18th
Lucy Huang	42	Diamond Bar, CA	Dietitian	Survivor: Millennials vs. Gen X	17th
Ciandre "CeCe" Taylor	39	Granada Hills, CA	Insurance Adjuster	Survivor: Millennials vs. Gen X	16th
Jessica "Figgy" Figueroa	23	Nashville, TN	Bartender	Survivor: Millennials vs. Gen X	15th
Michaela Bradshaw	25	Fort Worth, TX	Vacation Club Saleswoman	Survivor: Millennials vs. Gen X	14th
Michelle Schubert	28	Yakima, WA	Missionary Recruiter	Survivor: Millennials vs. Gen X	13th
Taylor Lee Stocker	24	Post Falls, ID	Snowboard Instructor	Survivor: Millennials vs. Gen X	12th
Chris Hammons	38	Moore, OK	Trial Attorney	Survivor: Millennials vs. Gen X	11th
Jessica Lewis	37	Voorheesville, NY	Assistant District Attorney	Survivor: Millennials vs. Gen X	10th
Zeke Smith	28	Brooklyn, NY	Asset Manager	Survivor: Millennials vs. Gen X	9th
Will Wahl	18	Long Valley, NJ	High School Student	Survivor: Millennials vs. Gen X	8th
Sunday Burquest	45	Otsego, MN	Youth Pastor	Survivor: Millennials vs. Gen X	7th
Justin "Jay" Starrett	27	Fort Lauderdale, FL	Real Estate Agent	Survivor: Millennials vs. Gen X	6th
Bret LaBelle	42	Dedham, MA	Police Sergeant	Survivor: Millennials vs. Gen X	5th
David Wright	42	Sherman Oaks, CA	Television Writer	Survivor: Millennials vs. Gen X	4th
Hannah Shapiro	24	West Hollywood, CA	Barista	Survivor: Millennials vs. Gen X	Co-runner up
Ken McNickle	33	Denver, CO	Model	Survivor: Millennials vs. Gen X	Co-runner up
Adam Klein	25	San Francisco, CA	Homeless Shelter Manager	Survivor: Millennials vs. Gen X	Winner
Ciera Eastin^{◊}	27	Salem, OR	Cosmetology Student	Survivor: Game Changers	20th
Tony Vlachos^{^}	42	Jersey City, NJ	Police Officer	Survivor: Game Changers	19th
Caleb Reynolds^{^}	28	Hopkinsville, KY	Army Veteran	Survivor: Game Changers	18th
Malcolm Freberg^{◊}	29	Hermosa Beach, CA	Bartender	Survivor: Game Changers	17th
James "J.T." Thomas, Jr.^{◊}	31	Mobile, AL	Cattle Rancher	Survivor: Game Changers	16th
Sandra Diaz-Twine^{◊}	42	Fayetteville, NC	Office Assistant	Survivor: Game Changers	15th
Jeff Varner^{◊}	50	High Point, NC	Internet Project Manager	Survivor: Game Changers	14th
Hali Ford^{^}	26	Knoxville, TN	Law Student	Survivor: Game Changers	13th
Ozzy Lusth^{o}	34	Venice, CA	Photographer	Survivor: Game Changers	12th
Debbie Wanner^{^}	51	Reading, PA	Chemist	Survivor: Game Changers	11th
Zeke Smith^{^}	28	Brooklyn, NY	Asset Manager	Survivor: Game Changers	10th
Sierra Dawn Thomas^{^}	29	Roy, UT	Barrel Racer	Survivor: Game Changers	9th
Andrea Boehlke^{◊}	27	New York, NY	Entertainment Host/Writer	Survivor: Game Changers	8th
Michaela Bradshaw^{^}	25	Fort Worth, TX	Vacation Club Sales	Survivor: Game Changers	7th
Cirie Fields^{o}	45	Norwalk, CT	Nurse	Survivor: Game Changers	6th
Aubry Bracco^{^}	30	Cambridge, MA	Social Media Marketer	Survivor: Game Changers	5th
Tai Trang^{^}	52	San Francisco, CA	Gardener	Survivor: Game Changers	4th
Troy "Troyzan" Robertson^{^}	54	Miami, FL	Swimsuit Photographer	Survivor: Game Changers	2nd Runner-up
Brad Culpepper^{^}	47	Tampa, FL	Attorney/Former NFL Player	Survivor: Game Changers	Runner-up
Sarah Lacina^{^}	32	Marion, IA	Police Officer	Survivor: Game Changers	Winner
Katrina Radke	46	Excelsior, MN	Olympian	Survivor: Heroes vs. Healers vs. Hustlers	18th
Simone Nguyen	25	New York, NY	Diversity Advocate	Survivor: Heroes vs. Healers vs. Hustlers	17th
Patrick Bolton	24	Auburn, AL	Small Business Owner	Survivor: Heroes vs. Healers vs. Hustlers	16th
Alan Ball	31	Houston, TX	NFL Player	Survivor: Heroes vs. Healers vs. Hustlers	15th
Roark Luskin	27	Santa Monica, CA	Social Worker	Survivor: Heroes vs. Healers vs. Hustlers	14th
Alexandrea "Ali" Elliott	24	Los Angeles, CA	Celebrity Assistant	Survivor: Heroes vs. Healers vs. Hustlers	13th
Jessica Johnston	29	Louisville, KY	Nurse Practitioner	Survivor: Heroes vs. Healers vs. Hustlers	12th
Desiree "Desi" Williams	27	Newport News, VA	Physical Therapist	Survivor: Heroes vs. Healers vs. Hustlers	11th
Cole Medders	24	Little Rock, AR	Wilderness Therapy Guide	Survivor: Heroes vs. Healers vs. Hustlers	10th
John Paul "JP" Hilsabeck	28	Los Angeles, CA	Firefighter	Survivor: Heroes vs. Healers vs. Hustlers	9th
Joe Mena	34	Tolland, CT	Probation Officer	Survivor: Heroes vs. Healers vs. Hustlers	8th
Lauren Rimmer	35	Beaufort, NC	Fisherwoman	Survivor: Heroes vs. Healers vs. Hustlers	7th
Ashley Nolan	26	Satellite Beach, FL	Lifeguard	Survivor: Heroes vs. Healers vs. Hustlers	6th
Mike Zahalsky	43	Parkland, FL	Urologist	Survivor: Heroes vs. Healers vs. Hustlers	5th
Devon Pinto	24	Solana Beach, CA	Surf Instructor	Survivor: Heroes vs. Healers vs. Hustlers	4th
Ryan Ulrich	23	North Arlington, NJ	Bellhop	Survivor: Heroes vs. Healers vs. Hustlers	2nd Runner-up
Chrissy Hofbeck	46	Lebanon Township, NJ	Actuary	Survivor: Heroes vs. Healers vs. Hustlers	Runner-up
Ben Driebergen	34	Boise, ID	Marine	Survivor: Heroes vs. Healers vs. Hustlers	Winner
Stephanie Gonzalez	26	Ocala, FL	Graphic Saleswoman	Survivor: Ghost Island	20th
Jacob Derwin	22	Merrick, NY	Music Teacher	Survivor: Ghost Island	19th
Morgan Ricke	29	Orlando, FL	Marine Animal Trainer	Survivor: Ghost Island	18th
Brendan Shapiro	41	Herndon, VA	Physical Education Teacher	Survivor: Ghost Island	17th
Stephanie Johnson	34	Chicago, IL	Yoga Instructor	Survivor: Ghost Island	16th
James Lim	24	New York, NY	Business Analyst	Survivor: Ghost Island	15th
Bradley Kleihege	26	Los Angeles, CA	Law Student	Survivor: Ghost Island	14th
Chris Noble	27	Brooklyn, NY	Male Model	Survivor: Ghost Island	13th
Libby Vincek	24	Nashville, TN	Social Media Strategist	Survivor: Ghost Island	12th
Desiree Afuye	21	Brooklyn, NY	Student	Survivor: Ghost Island	11th
Jenna Bowman	23	Venice Beach, CA	Advertising Account Executive	Survivor: Ghost Island	10th
Michael Yerger	18	Los Angeles, CA	Real Estate Agent	Survivor: Ghost Island	9th
Chelsea Townsend	24	Los Angeles, CA	EMT/Pro Cheerleader	Survivor: Ghost Island	8th
Kellyn Bechtold	31	Denver, CO	Career Counselor	Survivor: Ghost Island	7th
Sebastian Noel	22	Melbourne, FL	Fishing Guide	Survivor: Ghost Island	6th
Donathan Hurley	26	Kimper, KY	Caretaker	Survivor: Ghost Island	5th
Angela Perkins	42	Cincinnati, OH	Army Veteran	Survivor: Ghost Island	4th
Laurel Johnson	29	Minneapolis, MN	Financial Consultant	Survivor: Ghost Island	2nd Runner-up
Domenick Abbate	38	Nesconset, NY	Construction Supervisor	Survivor: Ghost Island	Runner-up
Wendell Holland	33	Philadelphia, PA	Furniture Company Owner	Survivor: Ghost Island	Winner
Pat Cusack	41	Cohoes, NY	Maintenance Manager	Survivor: David vs. Goliath	20th
Jessica Peet	19	Lakeland, FL	Waitress	Survivor: David vs. Goliath	19th
Jeremy Crawford	40	Clover, SC	Attorney	Survivor: David vs. Goliath	18th
Bi Nguyen	28	Houston, TX	Mixed Martial Arts Fighter	Survivor: David vs. Goliath	17th
Natalia Azoqa	25	Irvine, CA	Industrial Engineer	Survivor: David vs. Goliath	16th
Natalie Cole	57	Los Angeles, CA	Publishing CEO	Survivor: David vs. Goliath	15th
Lyrsa Torres	36	Boston, MA	Airline Agent	Survivor: David vs. Goliath	14th
Elizabeth Olson	31	Longview, TX	Kitchen Staff Member	Survivor: David vs. Goliath	13th
John Hennigan	38	Los Angeles, CA	Professional Wrestler	Survivor: David vs. Goliath	12th
Dan Rengering	27	Lake Butler, FL	S.W.A.T. Officer	Survivor: David vs. Goliath	11th
Alec Merlino	24	San Clemente, CA	Bartender	Survivor: David vs. Goliath	10th
Carl Boudreaux	41	Beaumont, TX	Truck Driver	Survivor: David vs. Goliath	9th
Gabby Pascuzzi	25	St. Augustine, FL	Technical Writer	Survivor: David vs. Goliath	8th
Christian Hubicki	32	Tallahassee, FL	Robotics Scientist	Survivor: David vs. Goliath	7th
Davie Rickenbacker	30	Orangeburg, SC	Social Media Manager	Survivor: David vs. Goliath	6th
Alison Raybould	28	Chapel Hill, NC	Physician	Survivor: David vs. Goliath	5th
Kara Kay	30	San Diego, CA	Realtor	Survivor: David vs. Goliath	4th
Angelina Keeley	28	Sparks, NV	Financial Consultant	Survivor: David vs. Goliath	2nd Runner-up
Mike White	47	Los Angeles, CA	Filmmaker	Survivor: David vs. Goliath	Runner-up
Nick Wilson	27	Williamsburg, KY	Public Defender	Survivor: David vs. Goliath	Winner
Reem Daly	46	Ashburn, VA	Sales Representative	Survivor: Edge of Extinction	18th
Keith Sowell	19	Durham, NC	Pre-Med Student	Survivor: Edge of Extinction	17th
Aubry Bracco^{◊}	32	Los Angeles, CA	Marketing Director	Survivor: Edge of Extinction	16th
Wendy Diaz	25	Bell, CA	Small Business Owner	Survivor: Edge of Extinction	15th
Joe Anglim^{◊}	29	Ogden, UT	Multimedia Artist	Survivor: Edge of Extinction	14th
Eric Hafemann	35	Livermore, CA	Firefighter	Survivor: Edge of Extinction	13th
Julia Carter	25	Bethesda, MD	Medical Assistant	Survivor: Edge of Extinction	12th
David Wright^{^}	44	Sherman Oaks, CA	Television Writer	Survivor: Edge of Extinction	11th
Kelley Wentworth^{◊}	31	Seattle, WA	Marketing Manager	Survivor: Edge of Extinction	10th
Dan "Wardog" DaSilva	38	Los Angeles, CA	Law Student/Former Military	Survivor: Edge of Extinction	9th
Ron Clark	46	Atlanta, GA	Teacher	Survivor: Edge of Extinction	8th
Aurora McCreary	32	Orlando, FL	Divorce Attorney	Survivor: Edge of Extinction	7th
Victoria Baamonde	23	Bronx, NY	Waitress	Survivor: Edge of Extinction	6th
Lauren O'Connell	21	Washington, DC	Student	Survivor: Edge of Extinction	5th
Rick Devens	33	Macon, GA	Morning News Anchor	Survivor: Edge of Extinction	4th
Julie Rosenberg	46	New York, NY	Toymaker	Survivor: Edge of Extinction	2nd Runner-up
Gavin Whitson	23	Erwin, TN	YMCA Program Director	Survivor: Edge of Extinction	Runner-up
Chris Underwood	25	Greenville, SC	District Sales Manager	Survivor: Edge of Extinction	Winner
Ronnie Bardah	35	Henderson, NV	Poker Player	Survivor: Island of the Idols	20th
Molly Byman	27	Durham, NC	Law Student	Survivor: Island of the Idols	19th
Vince Moua	27	Palo Alto, CA	Admissions Counselor	Survivor: Island of the Idols	18th
Chelsea Walker	26	Los Angeles, CA	Digital Content Creator	Survivor: Island of the Idols	17th
Tom Laidlaw	60	Greenwich, CT	Former NHL Player	Survivor: Island of the Idols	16th
Jason Linden	32	New York, NY	Personal Injury Attorney	Survivor: Island of the Idols	15th
Jack Nichting	23	Harrisonburg, VA	Grad Student	Survivor: Island of the Idols	14th
Kellee Kim	29	Philadelphia, PA	MBA Student	Survivor: Island of the Idols	13th
Jamal Shipman	33	Providence, RI	College Administrator	Survivor: Island of the Idols	12th
Aaron Meredith	36	Warwick, RI	Gym Owner	Survivor: Island of the Idols	11th
Tra'mese "Missy" Byrd	24	Tacoma, WA	Air Force Veteran	Survivor: Island of the Idols	10th
Elizabeth Beisel	26	Saunderstown, RI	Olympic Medalist	Survivor: Island of the Idols	9th
Karishma Patel	37	Houston, TX	Personal Injury Attorney	Survivor: Island of the Idols	8th
Elaine Stott	41	Rockholds, KY	Factory Worker	Survivor: Island of the Idols	7th
Dan Spilo	48	Los Angeles, CA	Talent Manager	Survivor: Island of the Idols	6th
Janet Carbin	59	Palm Bay, FL	Chief Lifeguard	Survivor: Island of the Idols	5th
Lauren Beck	28	Glendale, CA	Nanny	Survivor: Island of the Idols	4th
Noura Salman	36	North Potomac, MD	Entrepreneur	Survivor: Island of the Idols	2nd Runner-up
Dean Kowalski	28	New York, NY	Tech Sales	Survivor: Island of the Idols	Runner-up
Tommy Sheehan	26	Long Beach, NY	4th Grade Teacher	Survivor: Island of the Idols	Winner
Amber Mariano^{◊}	40	Pensacola, FL	Director of Marketing & Communications	Survivor: Winners at War	20th
Danni Boatwright^{^}	43	Shawnee, KS	Sideline Chic Owner	Survivor: Winners at War	19th
Ethan Zohn^{◊}	45	Hillsborough, NH	Keynote Speaker/Social Entrepreneur	Survivor: Winners at War	18th
Rob Mariano^{‡}	43	Pensacola, FL	Construction Worker	Survivor: Winners at War	17th
Parvati Shallow^{o}	36	Los Angeles, CA	Life Coach/Speaker/Yoga Teacher	Survivor: Winners at War	16th
Sandra Diaz-Twine^{o}	44	Riverview, FL	Case Manager	Survivor: Winners at War	15th
Yul Kwon^{^}	44	Los Altos, CA	Product Management	Survivor: Winners at War	14th
Wendell Holland^{^}	35	Philadelphia, PA	Furniture Designer	Survivor: Winners at War	13th
Adam Klein^{^}	28	Los Angeles, CA	Host/Keynote Speaker	Survivor: Winners at War	12th
Tyson Apostol^{o}	39	Mesa, AZ	Former Pro Cyclist/Shop Manager	Survivor: Winners at War	11th
Sophie Clarke^{^}	29	Santa Monica, CA	Healthcare Consultant	Survivor: Winners at War	10th
Kim Spradlin-Wolfe^{^}	36	San Antonio, TX	Interior Designer	Survivor: Winners at War	9th
Jeremy Collins^{◊}	41	Foxborough, MA	Firefighter	Survivor: Winners at War	8th
Nick Wilson^{^}	28	Williamsburg, KY	Attorney	Survivor: Winners at War	7th
Denise Stapley^{^}	48	Marion, IA	Sex Therapist	Survivor: Winners at War	6th
Ben Driebergen^{^}	36	Boise, ID	Real Estate Agent/Stay-at-home Dad	Survivor: Winners at War	5th
Sarah Lacina^{◊}	35	Cedar Rapids, IA	Police Officer	Survivor: Winners at War	4th
Michele Fitzgerald^{^}	29	Hoboken, NJ	Business Development Manager	Survivor: Winners at War	2nd Runner-up
Natalie Anderson^{^}	33	Edgewater, NJ	CrossFit Trainer	Survivor: Winners at War	Runner-up
Tony Vlachos^{◊}	45	Allendale, NJ	Police Officer	Survivor: Winners at War	Winner
