= Eurico Tavares =

Brazilian politician (born 1996)

Member of the Legislative Assembly of Amazonas
- Incumbent
- Assumed office 1 February 2027

Personal details
- Born: 30 August 1996 (age 30)
- Party: Social Democratic Party

Eurico de Angelo Tavares (born 30 August 1996) is a Brazilian politician who was elected member of the Legislative Assembly of Amazonas in 2026. He has been a municipal councillor of Manaus since 2025.
