= Suzy Tavarez =

American radio personality (born 1975)

Suzy Tavarez (born February 4, 1975) is an on-air radio personality for the Boston, Massachusetts-based radio station WJMN-FM, "JAM'N 94.5". Her other claims to fame include being a Miami Dolphins cheerleader (from 1998 to 2000), acting, and modeling.

Tavarez, from South Florida, started working for Power 96 in Miami. She became an on-air radio personality for another Miami station, Y-100, before undertaking roles such as cheerleading with the Dolphins and serving as a co-host on Latin MTV, based in Miami.

In January 2001, Tavarez moved to Atlanta where she was the nighttime on-air radio personality at Q100. She also appeared in several Atlanta media outlets including two magazines (Jezebel and the Atlanta Journal) and on two television stations (UPN and The WB).

In late February 2004, Tavarez moved to Los Angeles to pursue acting, although she eventually found a job with KIIS-FM. On June 29, 2007, Tavarez finished her on-air work for KIIS-FM in order to return to Miami, to be with her family.

In 2009, Tavarez once again joined South Florida's Y-100 (WHYI) as an on-air personality.

== See also ==
- NFL cheerleading
