= Big Brother 18 (American season) =

Coordinates: 34°8′40.12″N 118°23′20.71″W

Big Brother
- Season 18
- Promotional poster for Big Brother 18
- Hosted by: Julie Chen
- No. of days: 99
- No. of houseguests: 16
- Winner: Nicole Franzel
- Runner-up: Paul Abrahamian
- America's Favorite HouseGuest: Victor Arroyo
- Companion shows: Big Brother: Live Chat; Big Brother: After Dark
- No. of episodes: 42

Release
- Original network: CBS
- Original release: June 22 – September 21, 2016

Additional information
- Filming dates: June 15 – September 21, 2016

Season chronology
- ← Previous; Season 17 Next → Season 19

Big Brother 18 is the eighteenth season of the American reality television series Big Brother. The season featured an international travel theme. It premiered on June 22, 2016 with a two-hour season premiere, broadcast on CBS in the United States and Global in Canada, and ended with a 90-minute season finale on September 21, 2016, after 99 days of competition. Julie Chen returned as host. On September 21, 2016, season 16 HouseGuest Nicole Franzel was crowned the winner defeating Paul Abrahamian in a 5–4 jury vote. Victor Arroyo was voted as the season's America's Favorite HouseGuest.

== Format ==
Big Brother follows a group of contestants, known as HouseGuests, who live inside a custom-built house outfitted with cameras and microphones recording their every move 24 hours a day. The HouseGuests are sequestered with no contact with the outside world. During their stay, the HouseGuests share their thoughts on their day-to-day lives inside the house in a private room known as the Diary Room. Each week, the HouseGuests compete in competitions in order to win power and safety inside the house. At the start of each week, the HouseGuests compete in a Head of Household (abbreviated as "HOH") competition. The winner of the HoH competition is immune from eviction and selects two HouseGuests to be nominated for eviction. Six HouseGuests are then selected to compete in the Power of Veto (abbreviated as "PoV") competition: the reigning HoH, the nominees, and three other HouseGuests chosen by random draw. The winner of the PoV competition has the right to either revoke the nomination of one of the nominated HouseGuests or leave them as is. If the veto winner uses this power, the HoH must immediately nominate another HouseGuest for eviction. The PoV winner is also immune from being named as the replacement nominee. On eviction night, all HouseGuests vote to evict one of the nominees, though the Head of Household and the nominees are not allowed to vote. This vote is conducted in the privacy of the Diary Room. In the event of a tie, the Head of Household casts the tie-breaking vote. The nominee with the most votes is evicted from the house. The last nine evicted HouseGuests comprise the Jury and are sequestered in a separate location following their eviction and ultimately decide the winner of the season. The Jury is only allowed to see the competitions and ceremonies that include all of the remaining HouseGuests; they are not shown any interviews or other footage that might include strategy or details regarding nominations. The viewing public is able to award an additional prize of $25,000 by choosing "America's Favorite HouseGuest". All evicted HouseGuests are eligible to win this award except for those who either voluntarily leave or are forcibly removed for rule violations.

=== Format changes and additions ===
==== Teams ====
Similar to the cliques twist in Big Brother 11, the HouseGuests initially competed in teams, which were selected by school-yard pick before the first competition. When a HouseGuest won Head of Household, their entire team also earned immunity from nominations, while the team with the worst performance in each Head of Household competition became the Have-Nots for the week.

Team	Members
Category 4	Bridgette; Frank; Michelle; Paulie
Big Sister	Da'Vonne; Jozea; Paul; Zakiyah
Team Unicorn	Bronte; James; Natalie; Victor
Freakazoids	Corey; Glenn; Nicole; Tiffany

==== BB Roadkill ====
Following the nomination ceremony, the HouseGuests competed in the BB Roadkill competition, with the winner earning the power to privately nominate a third HouseGuest for eviction. For each Roadkill competition, an RV was placed in the backyard; one at a time, the HouseGuests entered the RV to complete the task. Following the competition, the HouseGuests were privately informed whether they had won or lost the challenge, with no obligation to ever reveal their results. The winner then named a third nominee in the Diary Room. Unlike the Head of Household, the Roadkill winner could nominate a member of his or her own team, provided their intended nominee did not have immunity. If the Roadkill nominee were saved by the Power of Veto, the Roadkill winner had to privately name a replacement nominee. On Day 37, the BB Roadkill competition was officially ended.

==== Battle Back ====
Instead of permanent eviction, the first five evicted HouseGuests received a chance to return to the game. The first two evictees faced off in a duel, with the winner advancing to face the next evicted HouseGuest, permanently eliminating the losers; the remaining evictee will re-enter the house, following four duels. All four duels aired in a special episode on July 22; Jozea defeated Glenn in the first competition, but Victor defeated Jozea, Bronte, and Tiffany in the subsequent competitions to return to the house.

==== Round Trip Ticket ====
Shortly after the end of the Battle Back, Teams and Roadkill twists, the HouseGuests were alerted to the existence of a secret room within the house. To find it, HouseGuests deciphered a series of clues hidden on decorations throughout the house to uncover a five-digit code, and then dialed the code into a phone booth in the house to reveal a tunnel to the room; only one HouseGuest was allowed to enter the room at a time. Inside the room were twelve envelopes, and each HouseGuest could only claim one envelope. Inside one of the envelopes was a "Round Trip Ticket," which would allow the HouseGuest who picked it to re-enter the house immediately following eviction. Envelopes could only be opened by a HouseGuest following their eviction. If a HouseGuest opened their envelope prior to their eviction, their card would be voided. Once all remaining HouseGuests entered the room and picked tickets, they were free to enter the room with no restrictions. The tickets were valid until Day 65; Paul had the Round Trip Ticket, but was not evicted while the tickets were still valid.

==== America's Care Package ====
Beginning in Week 6, Julie announced that for the next five weeks, viewers would be able to give one HouseGuest per week a special power, or "care package", as determined by a public vote. All five powers were revealed to the public upon the twist's introduction. The HouseGuests were made aware of this twist, though the weekly rewards were left unspecified until the package was dropped in the backyard for public unboxing. Once a HouseGuest received a care package, they were no longer eligible to win future packages.

Week	Name	Description	Winner	Outcome
6	Never Not Pass	The winner can no longer be named a Have-Not for the remainder of the season.	Natalie	Never-Not
7	Eliminate Two Eviction Votes	The winner can prevent two HouseGuests of their choice from voting in that week's eviction.	James	Corey, Paul
8	Super Safety	The winner is immune from eviction for the week, but must also wear a "Super Safety" costume all week long.	Nicole	Immune
9	Co-HoH	The winner automatically becomes Co-HoH, earning immunity and the right to choose one of the two nominees.	Michelle	Paul; Corey (Note: Michelle originally nominated Paul for eviction, however, after he won the veto and saved himself, Corey was nominated by Michelle as a replacement.)
10	BB Bribe	The winner gets $5,000 to be given as a bribe to one other HouseGuest to complete a particular task.	Corey	Corey bribed Victor to vote against Michelle.

== HouseGuests ==
The cast of the eighteenth season of Big Brother. Top: Natalie, Frank, Zakiyah, Paul, Jozea, Da'Vonne and Corey Second row: Glenn, Tiffany, Victor and Bridgette Third row: Paulie, James and Nicole Bottom: Bronte and Michelle

The twelve new HouseGuests were announced on June 14, 2016. Among them were two siblings of former Big Brother HouseGuests: Paulie Calafiore, brother of Big Brother 16 runner-up Cody Calafiore, and Tiffany Rousso, sister of Big Brother 17 HouseGuest Vanessa Rousso. This was also the fifth season to feature former HouseGuests returning to the game. The four returning players were announced during the premiere episode on June 22, 2016. As part of the House's travel theme, the returning HouseGuests were referred to as "stowaways," entering the House in suitcases shortly prior to the new HouseGuests' arrival. The returnees/stowaways were the 7th place finisher from Big brother season 14 Frank Eudy, the 7th place finisher of Big brother season 16 Nicole Franzel, the 7th place finisher from Big brother season 17 James Huling and the 16th place finisher from Big brother season 17 Da'vonne Rogers

Name	Age	Occupation	Residence	Day entered	Result
Nicole Franzel Big Brother 16	23	ER Nurse	Ubly, Michigan	1	Winner; Day 99
Paul Abrahamian	23	Fashion designer	Tarzana, California	1	Runner-up; Day 99
James Huling Big Brother 17	32	Staff recruiter	Wichita Falls, Texas	1	Evicted; Day 99
Corey Brooks	25	Baseball coach	Dallas, Texas	1	Evicted; Day 92
Victor Arroyo	25	Gym manager	Slidell, Louisiana	72	Evicted; Day 90
Victor Arroyo	25	Gym manager	Slidell, Louisiana	37	Evicted; Day 72
Victor Arroyo	25	Gym manager	Slidell, Louisiana	1	Evicted; Day 23
Natalie Negrotti	26	Event coordinator	Franklin Park, New Jersey	1	Evicted; Day 86
Michelle Meyer	23	Nutritionist	Washington Township, Michigan	1	Evicted; Day 79
Paulie Calafiore	27	DJ	Howell, New Jersey	1	Evicted; Day 65
Bridgette Dunning	24	Traveling nurse	Ventura, California	1	Evicted; Day 58
Zakiyah Everette	25	Preschool teacher	Charlotte, North Carolina	1	Evicted; Day 58
Da'Vonne Rogers Big Brother 17	28	Poker dealer	Lancaster, California	1	Evicted; Day 51
Frank Eudy Big Brother 14	32	Pharmaceutical sales representative	Charlotte, North Carolina	1	Evicted; Day 44
Tiffany Rousso	32	High school teacher	Palm Beach Gardens, Florida	1	Evicted; Day 37
Bronte D'Acquisto	26	Student	Denver, Colorado	1	Evicted; Day 30
Jozea Flores	25	Make-up artist	Los Angeles, California	1	Evicted; Day 16
Glenn Garcia	50	Dog groomer	Bronx, New York	1	Evicted; Day 2

=== Future appearances ===
Jozea Flores was one of two former Big Brother HouseGuests included in a public vote to compete in Big Brother: Over the Top, but he was not chosen to return. Paul Abrahamian returned for Big Brother 19 as a HouseGuest while Nicole Franzel returned to host the first HoH Competition of the season. In 2018, Abrahamian made a cameo appearance on the series premiere of Celebrity Big Brother during the first HoH competition. Later that year, Victor Arroyo, along with Abrahamian and Franzel appeared on Big Brother 20 to celebrate Nicole and Victor's engagement. In 2019, Franzel and Arroyo competed on The Amazing Race 31 In 2020, Cody Calafiore returned with Franzel alongside Da'Vonne Rogers to compete for a third time on Big Brother: All Stars. In 2023, Franzel competed on Big Brother Reindeer Games.

Rogers, Arroyo, Flores, Paulie Calafiore, and Natalie Negrotti competed on multiple seasons of MTV's The Challenge. In 2018, Calafiore appeared on the first season of Ex on the Beach, and later that year, Brooks and Flores appeared on the second season. In 2023, Calafiore competed on the second season of The Challenge: USA. In 2025, Rogers competed on the fifth season of The Challenge: All Stars.

In 2024, Rogers competed on the Amazon Freevee reality competition series The Goat. In 2025, Calafiore appeared on Peacock reality TV series Vanderpump Villa.

In 2025, Negrotti competed on The Amazing Race 38 partnered with her sister Stephanie.

== Summary ==
Week 1
The twelve new HouseGuests (HGs) entered the House. Julie Chen told them about the first twist: four HGs from previous seasons would join them. During the introductions, Paulie revealed his secret of being Big Brother 16 runner-up Cody Calafiore's brother. Tiffany decided to hold out about her sister, Big Brother 17 HouseGuest Vanessa Rousso, although Da'Vonne guessed the secret and planned to use it to her advantage. Some of the new HGs wanted to stick together and run the returnees out of the house; at the same time, the returnees knew they needed some newbies on their side to survive.

The HGs went outside to form four teams, each headed by a returnee. Julie Chen told the teams about a second twist: they would compete in four competitions. The winning team of each game would be safe and exempt from the next one. The last team remaining would compete against each other as individuals. The loser of the final part would be evicted. The remaining three would then decide among themselves which of their own would be the first Head of Household (HoH).

- Immunity Competition ("Ride the Rocket"): Each team must climb onto their rocket and stay on for as long as possible. The team that is eliminated first lands in "Notburg" and is Have-Nots for the week. The second team to fall goes to "Mystery Land" and receives a mystery punishment. The third team lands in "Cash City" and gets $10,000 to split. The last team lands in "Safeville," guaranteeing their safety for the next two evictions.

Big Sister became Have-Nots, Category 4 went to Mystery Land, and the Freakazoids received $10,000. Team Unicorn received immunity for two evictions. The three remaining teams then battled in a three-part competition called Hit the Road (HtR).

- Hit the Road, Part 1: Three members of each team hold three ropes tied to a ring that supports a beam. The free members dig in the sand for a block, place it on the shaft, and switch out with a teammate. If a block falls, they must start over. The first team to stack a fifteen-block castle on their beam and hit their buzzer wins.

Category 4 won and were immune from eviction and exempted from the succeeding parts.

- Hit the Road, Part 2: Teams must complete a three-dimensional, multi-tiered sandcastle puzzle. The first team to finish their sandcastle and step in a designated area wins.

Big Sister won. They were immune from eviction and exempted from the final part in which the Freakazoids went head-to-head.

- Hit the Road, Part 3: Each member of the team stands on a tilting island-like platform. Each climbs a palm tree, grabs a coconut, and places it in one of the designated holes that spells "SOS." The last member to fill the holes and grab the flag is evicted.

Nicole finished first, with Tiffany second and Corey edging out Glenn when the latter displaced some of his coconuts upon grabbing his flag. Glenn lost and was evicted immediately. The remaining members of the Freakazoids decided Nicole should be HoH, to the dismay of the other newbies, who originally planned to get rid of the returnees early in the game. As HoH, Nicole considered Da'Vonne's advice and targeted Jozea, whom Da'Vonne felt was leading the returnee revolt. She nominated Jozea and Paulie for eviction, with Paulie agreeing to go up as a pawn. To gain the numbers, the returnees pulled in newbies Zakiyah, Michelle, Corey, and Tiffany to form the "8 Pack" alliance. Julie then informed the HGs of a twist called the "BB Roadkill" competition.

- Roadkill ("Take It Off"): Each of the HGs must strip off their designated track suit while holding down three buttons in the driver's seat of the RV. If a button is released, their timer will go 30 times faster; if two, 60 times faster; and if all three, 120 times faster. The HG with the shortest recorded time upon hitting the buzzer will win.

Frank was the winner. Natalie, Bronte, and Bridgette formed the "Spy Girls" alliance in view of Tiffany, who informed the 8 Pack. As a punishment for landing in "Mystery Land," Category 4 had to wear "pixelated" costumes for the week. At the Roadkill ceremony, Frank secretly nominated Paul. Corey and Da'Vonne were selected to join Nicole, Jozea, Paulie, and Paul for the Power of Veto (PoV) competition.

- Power of Veto ("Dizzy Dog"): Wearing dog costumes, the HGs must spin on their stand 15 times to earn 45 seconds, which would cause them to become dizzy. They use this time frame to crawl along obstacles and stack dog treats on top of their doghouse. If they fail to return to their stand and respin before their 45 seconds is up, they will be eliminated. The first HG to stack all forty treats and hit their button wins.

Paul won and at the Veto ceremony, took himself off the block, forcing Frank to name Bridgette secretly as the replacement nominee. Jozea, confident he had the votes to stay, was evicted 7-4, with Team Unicorn, except for James, and Paul voting to evict Paulie. Julie then informed Jozea about the "Battle Back" competition and that he would compete against the next evicted HG.

Week 2
Following Jozea's eviction, the HGs participated in a new HoH competition.
- Head of Household ("Berry Balanced"): Each team must send a member across one of two log courses: a longer, easier one or a shorter, more difficult one. That member must then grab a red berry and return it to their team station to fill four columns with a total of 40 red berries. One column should be filled with ten red berries to lock in before proceeding to the next one. However, if a member falls along the course while a column is not locked in, that column loses its berries and he or she is eliminated from the team. The first team to retrieve the blue berry after filling their columns wins, with the retrieving member becoming HoH.

Category 4 won, giving them immunity from this week's eviction, and Paulie became HoH. Paulie targeted Team Unicorn for voting to evict him, with a plan to backdoor Victor for being a physical threat. He then nominated Bronte and Paul, who offered himself as a pawn to gain the trust of the House.

- Roadkill ("18 Dollas"): Each HG must look at a set of ten items with different prices. They must then put tags on six items that add up to exactly $18. The HG who correctly tags the six items and hits the buzzer fastest wins.

Victor won. He revealed his win to Paulie, who disclosed it to other HGs. At the Roadkill ceremony, Victor secretly nominated Tiffany for lack of association with him. With Paul aware of the plan to backdoor his closest ally, Victor, he advised him not to be too trusting of everyone, but the latter disagreed. Tiffany became paranoid about being the target but Paulie and her allies assured her she was safe. They, however, thought she was starting to play like her sister Vanessa and considered voting her out. Da'Vonne and Zakiyah were selected to join Paulie, Bronte, Paul, and Tiffany for the PoV competition.

- Power of Veto ("Toe-zarks"): The HGs have 12 minutes to collect letters with corresponding point values from big toes scattered in a pond. They must take the letters back to their board, one at a time, and spell the best word possible. The HG who correctly spells a word with the highest point value wins.

Paulie was the winner. Da'Vonne told Paulie and her allies about Tiffany's attempt to win the competition despite their wishes for her to throw it to prevent Victor from nominating someone from their alliance. This attempt reinforced their suspicions on her gameplay. At the Veto ceremony, however, Paulie pushed through with his plan, taking Paul off the block and naming Victor as the replacement nominee. Victor was evicted 9-1, with Paul voting to evict Bronte. During this week, Jozea and Glenn also faced off in the Battle Back competition.

- Battle Back, Round 1 ("Berry Balanced"): The two evictees face off in a competition inspired by this week's HoH competition. However, there are only two columns and an addition of a "poison berry," which if retrieved by an evictee will get rid of the berries in the other evictee's column that is not yet locked in. The first evictee to lock in both columns wins.

Jozea was the winner and will face off against next week's evictee. Glenn was permanently eliminated from the game.

Week 3
Following Victor's eviction, the HGs participated in the new HoH competition.
- Head of Household ("Kiss My Ace"): One member from each team must bounce a ball on a big tennis racket with bouncy strings in an attempt to land it in the highest-scored slot possible on their side of court. The member with the lowest score in each round will be eliminated. The teams then rotate members and bounce again. In case of a tie, all tied HGs will be eliminated, unless all four players got the same score, in which case they serve again. The last HG standing is the new HoH.

Bridgette was the winner, making her Category 4 teammates also immune from this week's eviction. The other HouseGuests felt that her HoH would be more of Frank's HoH because they were close allies. With Frank's advice, Bridgette nominated Paul and Tiffany for eviction, with Tiffany as the target for being a loose cannon. Despite being in the 8 Pack, Frank and Tiffany did not get along well.

- Roadkill ("Horn Star"): Each of the HouseGuests must press a set of five horns and listen to their respective honks. They then had to listen to a sequence of eight honks and repeat the sequence by pressing the correct horns. If they press the wrong horn, they will hear must try again. The Houseguest who repeats the sequence in the fastest time will win.

Frank was the winner, and at the Roadkill ceremony, secretly nominated Bronte for eviction. Bridgette was upset that her Spy Girls ally was nominated again, not knowing that her closest ally Frank did it. Natalie and Paulie were selected to join Bridgette, Bronte, Paul, and Tiffany for the PoV competition.

- Power of Veto ("Vetolicious"): The HouseGuests must look at a sequence of colored ingredients labeled with respective tastes that will be flashed on a monitor. Each ingredient is contained in a beaker. Julie will then ask a question about the sequence and the Houseguests must pour in their pot the ingredient that corresponds to their answer. If they pour the wrong ingredient, their pot will explode and they will be eliminated. It was also based on Saved By the Smell (BB17) and BB Blast (BB16). The last HG standing will win PoV, in addition to a dinner from Outback Steakhouse for their team and another team of their choice. Host was Da'Vonne.

Bridgette won and chose Big Sister to join Category 4 for the reward dinner. At the Veto ceremony, Bridgette kept her nominations the same. Frank was confident that Tiffany would be evicted. Da'Vonne, still having issues with Frank, rallied the rest of the 8 Pack to flip the vote against Bronte, knowing that Tiffany would go after Frank. On eviction night, Frank and Bridgette were blindsided when Bronte was evicted 5-4. During this week, Jozea and Victor also faced off in the Battle Back competition.

- Battle Back, Round 2 ("Kiss My Ace"): The two evictees will face off in a competition inspired by this week's HoH competition. They will have three balls and must bounce them, one at a time, on a big racket in an attempt to hit one of the five smaller, propped-up rackets with their opponent's face on them on the other side of the court. If they run out of balls, they must retrieve them and bounce again. The first evictee to hit all five rackets will win.

Victor was the winner and will face off against next week's evictee. Jozea became permanently eliminated from the game.

Week 4
Following Bronte's eviction, the HGs participated in the new HoH competition. Earlier they watched several caricatured photos of the first three evicted HGs on a European trip on the Memory Wall.
- Head of Household ("Euro Trippin"): Julie will read statements about the said photos, and the HGs will respond whether the comments are TRUE or FALSE. An incorrect answer will result in elimination. The last HG standing will be HoH.

Paulie was the winner, making his Category 4 teammates immune from this week's eviction and, to the dismay of the 8 Pack, postponing their plan of evicting Frank. Despite being enemies the previous week, Tiffany, Frank, and Bridgette aligned after being outcasts. They planned on targeting Paulie's alliance with Zakiyah, Nicole, and Corey for running the House. Paulie nominated Natalie and Tiffany for eviction, shifting the target back on Tiffany.

- Roadkill ("Gasping for Air"): Each of the HGs must hang air fresheners on colored lines. If an air freshener falls on the floor, it is out of play. The HG who hangs the most air fresheners in the shortest time will win. Tiffany was the winner, and at the Roadkill ceremony, secretly named her teammate and Paulie's closest ally, Corey, for eviction in hopes of shifting the power in the House. She told Da'Vonne she was the Roadkill winner, but Da'Vonne decided not to reveal this information to the 8 Pack to avoid further tension with Tiffany. Da'Vonne and Paul were selected to join Paulie, Natalie, Tiffany, and Corey for the PoV competition.
- Power of Veto ("Scooper Star"): HGs will compete in head-to-head matches. They must look at a set of ice-cream cones on a monitor, and replicate those cones by transferring one ice-cream scoop at a time, not setting any scoops on the ground, and only having three scoops on a cone. They must then press their buzzer and if correct, will win that round and eliminate their competitor. The last HG standing will win. Host was Zakiyah.

Corey was the winner, but considered not using the Veto on himself for fear of Nicole being nominated in his place. Shortly after the competition Da'Vonne started getting paranoid, which made Tiffany suspicious. At the Roadkill ceremony, Corey removed himself from the block, and Tiffany secretly nominated Da'Vonne in his place, hoping the House would see the latter as a bigger threat. Despite Tiffany campaigning hard to stay in the House, she was evicted 8-0. During this week, Victor and Bronte also faced off in the Battle Back competition.

- Battle Back, Round 3 ("Euro Trippin"):

Victor was the winner and will face off against next week's evictee. Bronte was permanently eliminated from the game.

Week 5
Following Tiffany's eviction, Julie revealed to the HouseGuests that both the team and Roadkill twists were dissolved. Julie also announced to the HouseGuests that the first five evicted HouseGuests competed in the Battle Back competition. Victor was revealed to be the champion of the Battle Back duels and returned to the House. Julie then revealed a twist to the viewers that would be in play for the next five weeks—in the House, there are secret clues to discover a secret room. Any HouseGuest who discovers this room has the opportunity to claim an envelope. One envelope holds a round trip ticket. Once a HouseGuest gets evicted, their envelope will be opened. If they have the ticket, their eviction will be null, and they will head back into the House.

Following Victor’s return, the HGs participated in the new HoH competition

- Head of Household ("Watch Your Dubstep"): In this competition, HouseGuests had a wristband attached to a confetti box. They must keep their hand above their head while stepping over the light bars that shuffle by their feet. If they drop their hand, their confetti box will open, eliminating them from the competition. The last HouseGuest standing will be the new Head of Household. James was the winner.

On Day 38, James nominated Bridgette and Frank for eviction, with Frank as the target. On Day 39, James, Bridgette and Frank, as well as Michelle, Da’Vonne, and Nicole, competed in the veto competition.

- Power of Veto ("OTEV the Dope DJ"): In this competition, OTEV asked the HouseGuests a riddle about a competition. They then had to find a record with the name of the competition described in the riddle. The last HouseGuest to return the correct record to OTEV will be eliminated. The last HouseGuest standing will win the Power of Veto.

Michelle won the Power of Veto. On Day 41, Michelle decided not to use the Power of Veto. On Day 42, all the HouseGuests solved the clues and discovered the secret room. On Day 44, Frank was evicted 9-0 and was revealed not to have the round trip ticket. Julie also revealed another twist to the viewers-- "America's Care Package"—where for the next five weeks, America voted to send a care package to a HouseGuest. Once a HouseGuest receives a care package, they may not receive a future one.

Week 6
Following Frank’s eviction, the HGs participated in the new HoH competition
- Head of Household ("Perfect Shot"): Each HouseGuest had a lane with slots numbered 1-21. They must roll their ball down their lane to make the highest score. They had the opportunity to practice by rolling their yellow ball down their lane as often as they wanted. Whenever they decided to take their best shot, they must roll the red ball. Whatever slot the red ball lands in will be their official score. The HouseGuest with the highest score will be the new Head of Household.

Paul won. The bottom four performers, Corey, Natalie, Paulie, and Zakiyah, became Have-Nots for the week. However, Natalie received America's Care Package, which contained a Never-Not Pass, rendering her immune from being a Have-Not for the rest of the season. On Day 45, Paul nominated Bridgette and Paulie for eviction. On Day 46, Paul, Bridgette, Paulie, Corey, Victor, and Natalie competed in the veto competition.

- Power of Veto ("Ready, Set, Whoa"): HouseGuests had to hold down two buttons in their starting lane. At the end of their lanes, a monitor cycles through the words "ready, set, go." If a HouseGuest releases a button before the word "go," they are eliminated. Once they see "go," they must run to the end of their lane and hit one of the five buttons. The last person to hit a button is eliminated. Once a HouseGuest uses a button, it is out of play for future rounds. The last HouseGuest standing wins the Power of Veto.

Paulie won. On Day 48, he took himself off the block, and Paul named Da'Vonne as the replacement nominee. On Day 51, she was evicted 6-2, with Michelle and Zakiyah voting to evict Bridgette. Da'Vonne was revealed not to have the round trip ticket and became the first member of the jury.

Week 7
Following Da'Vonne's eviction, the HGs participated in the new HoH competition.
- Head of Household ("Harsh Hashtags"): In this competition, HouseGuests stood on a small disc suspended by a hanging rope. As the competition continued, they spun into punching bags. If a HouseGuest falls off their disc, they are eliminated. The last HouseGuest standing will be the new Head of Household.

Victor won. For being the first three HouseGuests to fall, Bridgette, Corey, and James became Have-Nots for the week. James received America's Care Package, which contained the power to prevent two HouseGuests from voting at the next eviction. On Day 52, Victor nominated Michelle and Zakiyah for eviction. On Day 53, Victor, Michelle, and Zakiyah chose Paulie, James, and Nicole for the POV competition.

- Power of Veto ("Hide and Go Veto"): HouseGuests had three minutes to hide their locked veto card in the House individually. Then, one at a time, HouseGuests entered the House and had one minute to attempt to find a veto card. If a HouseGuest's veto card is revealed, they are eliminated, though the owner of the veto cards will not be revealed until the end of the competition. The HouseGuest who hides their veto card the best will win the Power of Veto.

Paulie won but on Day 55 decided not to use the Power of Veto. At the live eviction, Julie informed the HouseGuests of the Double Eviction. Just before the first live vote, James used his America's Care Package to prevent Corey and Paul from voting. On Day 58, Zakiyah was evicted 3-2, with Nicole and Paulie voting to evict Michelle. Zakiyah was revealed not to have the round trip ticket, and she became the second member of the jury. Immediately after Zakiyah's eviction, the HGs participated in the new HoH competition.

- Head of Household ("Statcathalon"):The HouseGuests received numerical questions. HouseGuests were required to state whether the real number was more or less than the number mentioned in the question. An incorrect answer resulted in elimination. The last HouseGuest standing will be the new Head of Household.

Corey was the winner and nominated Bridgette and Michelle for eviction, putting the plan to evict Bridgette in motion. Corey, Bridgette, and Michelle, as well as Paul, Nicole, and James, later competed in the POV competition.

- Power of Veto ("Veto Time"):HouseGuests had to run across their lane into their ball pit at the end. They must search through the balls to find three clocks, then return their clocks to their stand one at a time. After they retrieve all of the clocks, they must grab their veto symbol above their ball pit and hit their button. The first HouseGuest to hit their button wins the Power of Veto.

Corey won but decided not to use the Power of Veto. On Day 58, Bridgette was evicted by a 5-1 vote, with Natalie voting to evict Michelle. Bridgette was revealed not to have the round trip ticket, and she became the third member of the jury.

Week 8
Following Zakiyah and Bridgette's evictions, the HGs participated in the new HoH competition.
- Head of Household ("Hollywood Squirrels"):HouseGuests competed in one-on-one matches. In each round, they were asked a question based on a grid of Benny the BB Comp Squirrels. If a HouseGuest buzzes in with the correct answer, they eliminate their opponent. If they are incorrect, they are eliminated. The HouseGuest who survives in each round must pick the next two HouseGuests to face off. The last HouseGuest standing is the new Head of Household.

Victor won. For being the first two HouseGuests eliminated, Michelle and Nicole became Have-Nots for the week. Nicole received America's Care Package, which contained safety for the week, on the condition that she wear a "Super Safety" costume all week. On Day 59, Victor nominated Corey and Paulie for eviction, with Paulie as the target. On Day 60, Zingbot made an appearance and hosted Victor, Corey, Paulie, Paul, Nicole, and James in the POV competition, with Natalie moderating.

- Power of Veto ("Zingbot for President"): In each round, HouseGuests launched a beanbag at a map to claim votes for Zingbot. Once a spot has been landed in, future tosses into that spot will have a score of zero. The HouseGuest with the fewest votes in each round will be eliminated from the competition. After each HouseGuest has been eliminated, they claim a campaign gift. HouseGuests eliminated in future rounds have the option of keeping their gift or claiming a gift already revealed. The HouseGuest with the Power of Veto at the end of the game will win the Power of Veto. Paul became a member of the BB Secret Service, James won $5,000, Paulie must bake apple pies any time he is instructed by Big Brother for the rest of the season, Corey has to wear the "Patriotard" for the week, and Nicole won a trip to anywhere in the United States.

Victor won the Power of Veto. On Day 62, he decided not to use the Power of Veto. On Day 65, Paulie was evicted 5-0 and was revealed not to have the round trip ticket and became the fourth member of the jury. The tickets expired, and it was later revealed that Paul had the round trip ticket.

Week 9
The HouseGuests celebrated how far they have survived as they enjoyed a carnival, with a chance to win prizes such as $5,000, a tech-pack containing a new TV, tablet, and smartphone, along with a performance from Ziggy Marley. They also picked pies to determine Have-Nots for the week, as well as an advantage in the next Head of Household competition. Michelle, James, and Victor became Have-Nots for the week.
- Head of Household ("The Black Box"): In this competition, the HouseGuests entered the black box and held down their button. Throughout the competition, HouseGuests were given opportunities to search the black box for discs. There are also dummy discs that will not fit on their pole. If a HouseGuest does not return to their button before time is up, they are eliminated. After two hours and ten searches, the player who survives with the most discs will be the new Head of Household. Michelle won the advantage for the competition and received an extra 30-second solo search.

Natalie was the winner. Michelle received America's Care Package, which contained the power of co-HOH. She and Natalie both have safety, share the HOH room, and each name one nominee. Michelle's week as a Have-Not was also cancelled. On Day 66, Michelle and Natalie nominated Paul and Victor for eviction, respectively. On Day 67, all HouseGuests except Nicole competed in the POV competition.

- Power of Veto ("BB Storm Watch"): In the days leading up to the competition, HouseGuests listened to BB Storm Watch updates. In this competition, HouseGuests competed individually. HouseGuests looked at a teleprompter for sentences with blanks. They had to report the weather and fill in the blanks with the name of one of the first five evicted HouseGuests while standing in a storm. If the sentence passes through the teleprompter before the HouseGuest fills in the blank, they will be incorrect. The HouseGuest who fills in the most blanks will win the Power of Veto.

Paul was the winner. On Day 69, he took himself off the block, and Michelle named Corey as the replacement nominee. On Day 72, Victor was evicted by a 2-1 vote, with Paul voting to evict Corey. He became the fifth member of the jury. Julie then informed the HouseGuests that the jurors will compete in the next Head of Household competition, with one of them returning to the game.

Week 10
Following Victor's second eviction, the HGs participated in the new HoH competition.
- Head of Household ("Welcome to Loch Mess"): In this competition, HouseGuests stood on a small platform against a wall. If anyone falls off, they will be eliminated. The last juror standing will be back in the game, and the last HouseGuest standing overall will be the new Head of Household.

Victor beat out the other jurors to re-enter the game, becoming the first HouseGuest in Big Brother history to return to the House twice in one season. Nicole became the new Head of Household. For being the first two HouseGuests to fall, Corey and Victor became Have-Nots for the week. Corey received America's Care Package, which gave him $5,000 to use to bribe another HouseGuest in the upcoming week. On Day 73, Nicole nominated Michelle and Paul for eviction, with Michelle as the target. On Day 74, all HouseGuests except Natalie competed in the POV competition.

- Power of Veto ("Santa's Little Counters"): HouseGuests had a few minutes to count groups of items throughout the backyard. In this competition, they were asked how many of a certain object were in the display. After everyone revealed their answer, they stay or fold. If a HouseGuest folds, they are ineligible to win a candy cane but cannot be eliminated. If a HouseGuest stays and is the closest to the correct answer, they win a candy cane. If a HouseGuest stays and they are the furthest away from the answer, they will be eliminated. The first HouseGuest to get three candy canes will win the Power of Veto.

Nicole was the winner. On Day 76, she decided not to use the Power of Veto. Corey used his bribe on Victor in return for him voting out Michelle. On Day 79, after Nicole cast the tie-breaking vote, Michelle was evicted by a 3-2 vote, with James and Natalie voting to evict Paul. She became the fifth member of the jury.

Week 11
Following Michelle's eviction, the HGs participated in the new HoH competition.
- Head of Household ("Poached Eggs"): In this competition, HouseGuests had to maneuver eggs through their chicken wire and through their hole. They then had to roll their egg down the ramp in an attempt to knock down the letters "HOH." The first HouseGuest to knock down all of their letters would become the new Head of Household.

Victor was the winner and became HOH. For being the last two HouseGuests to place an egg in their special "Have" holder, Natalie and Victor became Have-Nots for the week. However, because Victor won HoH and Natalie had a Never-Not Pass, all of the HouseGuests were safe from being Have-Nots for the week. On Day 80, Victor nominated James and Natalie for eviction. On Day 81, all of the HouseGuests competed in the POV competition.

- Power of Veto ("Being Mac"): sponsored by the new CBS show, MacGyver. In this competition, HouseGuests competed individually. They had to figure out how to escape three different rooms as fast as possible. The HouseGuest who escapes all three rooms fastest will win the Power of Veto, as well as a trip to the set of MacGyver.

Corey was the winner, but on Day 83, decided not to use the Power of Veto. On Day 86, Natalie was evicted 3-0. She became the sixth member of the jury.

Week 12
Following Natalie's eviction, the HGs participated in the new HoH competition.
- Head of Household ("Slide-In Theater"): In this competition, HouseGuests had to fill their small scoop with butter, walk to the end of their slippery lane, and pour it into their bowl. If a HouseGuest fills up their small bowl, they receive a larger scoop. The first HouseGuest to retrieve the ball from their large bowl will be the new Head of Household.

Corey was the winner and, on Day 87, nominated Paul and Victor for eviction. On Day 88, the HouseGuests zipped in the veto competition.

- Power of Veto ("BB Comics"): A spoof of DC Comics. In this competition, HouseGuests competed individually. HouseGuests had to ride a zip line past the comic studio window to get a look at a set of sixteen comics. They must replicate the comic studio on their computer. However, there are decoy comics with slight differences. The HouseGuest who replicates the studio wall in the fastest time will win the Power of Veto.

Featuring:

- Glenn as Doctor Groom
- Jozea as the Hot Mess-iah
- Bronte as the Mathematician
- Tiffany as the Emotional Wrecking Ball
- Frank as Eudy's Booty
- Da'Vonne as Day-Struction
- Zakiyah as The Hottie
- Bridgette as the Killer Cabbage
- Paulie as aPIEcalypse
- Michelle as Big Meech
- Natalie as Princess Pep
- Victor as El Fit Vic
- Corey as the Missile-Toe
- James as Colonel Camo
- Paul as the Motormouth
- Nicole as the Super Safety Girl

Nicole was the winner. On Day 89, she decided not to use the Power of Veto. On Day 90, Victor was evicted by a 2-0 vote. He became the seventh member of the jury.

Following Victor’s third eviction, the HGs participated in the new HoH competition.

- Head of Household ("What the #$@!?? (Bleep)"): HouseGuests were shown a series of clips with a censored word or words. Julie then gives them words as to what the blurred phrase may be. The HouseGuests must state if her suggestion is true or false. A correct answer earned a HouseGuest a point. The HouseGuest with the most points after seven questions will be the new Head of Household.

Paul was the winner and, on Day 91, nominated Corey and Nicole for eviction. On Day 92, the HouseGuests competed in the veto competition.

- Final Power of Veto ("Cover Your Bases"): In this competition, HouseGuests were asked on what day a certain event took place in the House. The HouseGuests had to step on their bases to display the correct day, then hit the umpire to lock in their answer. If they are incorrect, their counter will drop to zero and they must try again. The last person to display the correct day get a strike, and three strikes resulted in elimination. The last HouseGuest standing will win the Power of Veto.

Paul was the winner, but on Day 92, decided not to use the Power of Veto. On Day 92, after James cast the sole vote to evict Corey, he became the eighth member of the jury.

Week 13
Following Corey's eviction, the HouseGuests engaged in their final battle in Part 1 of the Final Head of Household competition.
- Head of Household, Part 1 ("Hang In There Kitty"):HouseGuests had to follow a laser to one of three endurance stations. Once the laser stops, they have fifteen seconds to climb onto the station. If the laser re-appears, they must jump off of their station and follow it again. If they fail to climb onto their station within 15 seconds or fall before the laser re-appears, they will be eliminated. The last HouseGuest standing will win Part 1 of the competition and advance to Part 3.

Paul was the winner. James and Nicole then faced off in Part 2 of the Final Head of Household competition.

- Head of Household, Part 2 ("Snap Shot"): James and Nicole competed individually. They had to read a clue and place the three HouseGuests that applied to the clue into the roller coaster car. They had to push the car down the track, then take a snapshot of the HouseGuests while in frame. If they are incorrect or the HouseGuests are not in frame, they must try again. The HouseGuest who finishes all three snapshots faster will win Part 2 and advance to Part 3 against Paul. Nicole was the winner.

Paul and Nicole had the final showdown in Part 3 of the Final Head of Household competition.

- Head of Household, Part 3 ("Scales of Just-Us"): In this competition, Nicole and Paul were read a series of statements made by the jurors, then guessed how the juror completed each statement. The HouseGuest with the most points after eight questions is the final Head of Household of the season.

Paul won 4-3. On Day 99, after he cast the sole vote to evict, James became the final member of the jury. On Day 99, after receiving Da'Vonne, Zakiyah, Paulie, Natalie, and Corey's votes, Nicole received $500,000 and was declared the winner of Big Brother 18, the first female winner since Rachel Reilly in Big Brother 13 and the first woman to win against a man in the final two. Paul received $50,000 as the runner-up, and Victor was revealed to be America's Favorite HouseGuest, receiving $25,000 and bringing his total cash winnings to $30,000.

== Episodes ==
No. overall	No. in season	Title	Original release date
586	1	"Episode 1"	June 22, 2016
587	2	"Episode 2"	June 23, 2016
588	3	"Episode 3"	June 26, 2016
589	4	"Episode 4"	June 29, 2016
590	5	"Episode 5"	June 30, 2016
591	6	"Episode 6"	July 3, 2016
592	7	"Episode 7"	July 6, 2016
593	8	"Episode 8"	July 7, 2016
594	9	"Episode 9"	July 10, 2016
595	10	"Episode 10"	July 13, 2016
596	11	"Episode 11"	July 14, 2016
597	12	"Episode 12"	July 17, 2016
598	13	"Episode 13"	July 20, 2016
599	14	"Episode 14"	July 21, 2016
600	15	"Episode 15"	July 22, 2016
601	16	"Episode 16"	July 24, 2016
602	17	"Episode 17"	July 27, 2016
603	18	"Episode 18"	July 28, 2016
604	19	"Episode 19"	July 31, 2016
605	20	"Episode 20"	August 3, 2016
606	21	"Episode 21"	August 4, 2016
607	22	"Episode 22"	August 7, 2016
608	23	"Episode 23"	August 10, 2016
609	24	"Episode 24"	August 11, 2016
610	25	"Episode 25"	August 14, 2016
611	26	"Episode 26"	August 17, 2016
612	27	"Episode 27"	August 18, 2016
613	28	"Episode 28"	August 19, 2016
614	29	"Episode 29"	August 21, 2016
615	30	"Episode 30"	August 24, 2016
616	31	"Episode 31"	August 25, 2016
617	32	"Episode 32"	August 28, 2016
618	33	"Episode 33"	August 31, 2016
619	34	"Episode 34"	September 1, 2016
620	35	"Episode 35"	September 4, 2016
621	36	"Episode 36"	September 7, 2016
622	37	"Episode 37"	September 8, 2016
623	38	"Episode 38"	September 11, 2016
624	39	"Episode 39"	September 13, 2016
625	40	"Episode 40"	September 14, 2016
626	41	"Episode 41"	September 16, 2016
627	42	"Episode 42"	September 21, 2016

== Voting history ==
Color key:

Winner
Runner-up
Head of Household
Nominated for eviction
Immune from eviction
Team immunity
Not eligible to vote
Evicted
Re-entered the game

Voting history (season 18)
	Team phase					Individual phase											
	Week 1		Week 2	Week 3	Week 4	Week 5	Week 6	Week 7		Week 8	Week 9	Week 10	Week 11	Week 12		Week 13	
	Day 2	Day 9	Week 2	Week 3	Week 4	Week 5	Week 6	Day 51	Day 58 (Note: This week was a double eviction week. Following the first eviction, the remaining HouseGuests played a week's worth of games – including Head of Household and veto competitions; and nomination, veto and, eviction ceremonies – during the live show, culminating in a second eviction for the week.)	Week 8	Week 9	Week 10	Week 11	Day 86	Day 90	Day 99	Finale
Head(s) of Household	(None)	Nicole	Paulie	Bridgette	Paulie	James	Paul	Victor	Corey	Victor	Natalie; Michelle (Note: Michelle was named co-Head of Household, earning her the right to make one of the two nominations and their replacements, if necessary.)	Nicole	Victor	Corey	Paul	Paul	(None)
Roadkill winner	(None)	Frank	Victor	Frank	Tiffany	(None)										(None)	(None)
Nominations (initial)	(None)	Jozea; Paul (Note: This player was nominated for eviction by the winner of the Roadkill competition.); Paulie	Bronte; Paul; Tiffany	Bronte; Paul; Tiffany	Corey; Natalie; Tiffany	Bridgette; Frank	Bridgette; Paulie	Michelle; Zakiyah	Bridgette; Michelle	Corey; Paulie	Paul; Victor	Michelle; Paul	James; Natalie	Paul; Victor	Corey; Nicole	(None)	(None)
Veto winner	(None)	Paul	Paulie	Bridgette	Corey	Michelle	Paulie	Paulie	Corey	Victor	Paul	Nicole	Corey	Nicole	Paul	(None)	(None)
Nominations (final)	(None)	Bridgette; Jozea; Paulie	Bronte; Tiffany; Victor	Bronte; Paul; Tiffany	Da'Vonne; Natalie; Tiffany	Bridgette; Frank	Bridgette; Da'Vonne	Michelle; Zakiyah	Bridgette; Michelle	Corey; Paulie	Corey; Victor	Michelle; Paul	James; Natalie	Paul; Victor	Corey; Nicole	James; Nicole	(None)
Nicole	Nominated	Head of Household	Victor	Bronte	Tiffany	Frank	Da'Vonne	Michelle	Bridgette	Paulie (Note: Nicole was awarded immunity for the week.)	Victor	Michelle (Note: As the vote was tied, the Head of Household cast the tie-breaker vote.)	Natalie	Victor	Nominated	Nominated	Winner
Paul	No vote	Paulie	Bronte	Nominated	Tiffany	Frank	Head of Household	Not eligible (Note: James was awarded the power to block two HouseGuests from voting in this week's eviction; he chose Corey and Paul.)	Bridgette	Paulie	Corey	Nominated	Natalie	Nominated	Head of Household	James (Note: As Head of Household, Paul chose to evict James.)	Runner-up
James	No vote	Jozea (Note: Since Victor won the opening competition, his team won immunity for the first two evictions.)	Victor	Tiffany	Tiffany	Head of Household	Da'Vonne	Zakiyah	Bridgette	Paulie	Victor	Paul	Nominated	Victor	Corey	Evicted (Day 99)	Paul
Corey	Nominated	Jozea (Note: This player received immunity because their teammate was Head of Household.)	Victor	Bronte	Tiffany	Frank	Da'Vonne	Not eligible	Head of Household	Nominated	Nominated	Michelle	Natalie	Head of Household	Nominated	Evicted (Day 92)	Nicole
Victor	No vote	Paulie	Nominated	Evicted (Day 23)		Frank	Da'Vonne	Head of Household	Bridgette	Head of Household	Nominated	Michelle (Note: Corey earned $5,000 to give to another HouseGuest; accepting the bribe would force that HouseGuest to complete a task. Corey bribed Victor to vote out Michelle.)	Head of Household	Nominated	Re-evicted (Day 90)		Paul
Natalie	No vote	Paulie	Victor	Tiffany	Nominated	Frank	Da'Vonne	Zakiyah	Michelle	Paulie	Co-Head of Household	Paul	Nominated	Evicted (Day 86)			Nicole
Michelle	No vote	Jozea	Victor	Bronte	Tiffany	Frank	Bridgette	Nominated	Nominated	Paulie	Co-Head of Household	Nominated	Evicted (Day 79)				Paul
Paulie	No vote	Nominated	Head of Household	Tiffany	Head of Household	Frank	Da'Vonne	Michelle	Bridgette	Nominated	Evicted (Day 65)						Nicole
Bridgette	No vote	Nominated	Victor	Head of Household	Tiffany	Nominated	Nominated	Zakiyah	Nominated	Evicted (Day 58)							Paul
Zakiyah	No vote	Jozea	Victor	Bronte	Tiffany	Frank	Bridgette	Nominated	Evicted (Day 58)								Nicole
Da'Vonne	No vote	Jozea	Victor	Bronte	Nominated	Frank	Nominated	Evicted (Day 51)									Nicole
Frank	No vote	Jozea	Victor	Tiffany	Tiffany	Nominated	Evicted (Day 44)										
Tiffany	Nominated	Jozea	Nominated	Nominated	Nominated	Evicted (Day 37)											
Bronte	No vote	Paulie	Nominated	Nominated	Evicted (Day 30)												
Jozea	No vote	Nominated	Evicted (Day 16)														
Glenn	Nominated	Evicted (Day 2)															
Evicted	Glenn; Evicted by competition (Note: Following the opening competition, the HouseGuests from the other three teams competed in a three-round competition to remain in the house. Team Freakazoids competed in the third round as individuals and Glenn lost the competition, and was thus evicted.)	Jozea; 7 of 11 votes to evict	Victor; 9 of 10 votes to evict	Bronte; 5 of 9 votes to evict	Tiffany; 8 of 8 votes to evict	Victor; Won re-entry into game (Note: Glenn, Jozea, Victor, Bronte, and Tiffany competed for a chance to re-enter the game. Victor won the competition and re-entered the house.)	Da'Vonne; 6 of 8 votes to evict	Zakiyah; 3 of 5 votes to evict	Bridgette; 5 of 6 votes to evict	Paulie; 5 of 5 votes to evict	Victor; 2 of 3 votes to evict	Victor; Won re-entry into game (Note: Da'Vonne, Zakiyah, Bridgette, Paulie, and Victor competed for a chance to re-enter the game. Victor won the competition and re-entered the house.)	Natalie; 3 of 3 votes to evict	Victor; 2 of 2 votes to evict	Corey; James' choice to evict	James; Paul's choice to evict	Nicole; 5 votes to win
Evicted	Glenn; Evicted by competition	Jozea; 7 of 11 votes to evict	Victor; 9 of 10 votes to evict	Bronte; 5 of 9 votes to evict	Tiffany; 8 of 8 votes to evict	Frank; 9 of 9 votes to evict	Da'Vonne; 6 of 8 votes to evict	Zakiyah; 3 of 5 votes to evict	Bridgette; 5 of 6 votes to evict	Paulie; 5 of 5 votes to evict	Victor; 2 of 3 votes to evict	Michelle; 3 of 5 votes to evict	Natalie; 3 of 3 votes to evict	Victor; 2 of 2 votes to evict	Corey; James' choice to evict	James; Paul's choice to evict	Paul; 4 votes to win

== Production ==
On September 24, 2014, CBS announced that it had renewed Big Brother for its 17th and 18th editions for broadcast in summer 2015 and 2016, respectively. The series would continue to be hosted by Julie Chen.

== Reception ==
=== Critical response ===
Bronte D'Acquisto and Paul Abrahamian were captured on live feed making racist remarks about fellow HouseGuest James Huling, who is ethnically Korean. Although Huling is a lifelong resident of the United States, D'Acquisto stated that she "will send [Huling] back to Hong Kong". In another incident, while discussing Huling, D'Acquisto said: "I want to kick his little Asian ass back to Hong Kong. Wherever he came from." Furthermore, Abrahamian referred to Huling as a "little Korean man" on multiple occasions. These incidents were not aired on the CBS television broadcasts.

Jozea Flores also created controversy during the beginning of the live feeds, saying that the 4th of July should not be a holiday. When a comment became brought up that "a lot of Americans died for our freedom," Flores replied with, "ain't nobody told them to do that." While his remarks did not make the live feeds, many of the HouseGuests talked about it.

Corey Brooks faced some criticism due to homophobic tweets that were found on his Twitter account, as well as homophobic remarks he made while inside the house. Brooks also faced more controversy after telling a story on the live feeds of his friend attempting to burn a goat. This was not shown on the CBS television broadcasts.

Paulie Calafiore made a series of offensive remarks to fellow HouseGuest Natalie Negrotti about her breast implants. Upon realizing that the house had grown weary of his abuse and running the game, including Negrotti, Calafiore began a campaign of harassment referring to Negrotti's implants and body. Calafiore routinely referring to Natalie as "F.T." (Fake Tits) and telling Negrotti that she was "as fake as those things on her chest." Calafiore also received criticism for his misogynistic and sexist comments about women from New Jersey, stating they "play" men and "spit them out and eat them for breakfast, lunch and dinner." He referred to these types of women as "Jersey Girls" and afterward received backlash from female viewers, particularly those from New Jersey, viewing it as a derogatory comment and reinforcing stereotypes.

=== Viewing figures ===
#	Air Date	United States				Source
#	Air Date	18–49 (rating/share)	Viewers (millions)	Rank (timeslot)	Rank (night)	Source
1	Wednesday, June 22, 2016	1.9/7	6.31	1	1	
2	Thursday, June 23, 2016	1.7/6	5.67	1	1	
3	Sunday, June 26, 2016	1.6/6	5.45	1	2	
4	Wednesday, June 29, 2016	1.9/7	6.13	1	1	
5	Thursday, June 30, 2016	1.8/7	5.87	1	1	
6	Sunday, July 3, 2016	1.4/6	4.73	1	1	
7	Wednesday, July 6, 2016	1.9/8	6.18	1	1	
8	Thursday, July 7, 2016	1.9/7	6.18	1	1	
9	Sunday, July 10, 2016	1.7/7	5.67	1	2	
10	Wednesday, July 13, 2016	1.8/8	6.05	2	2	
11	Thursday, July 14, 2016	1.9/7	6.18	1	1	
12	Sunday, July 17, 2016	1.8/7	5.85	1	1	
13	Wednesday, July 20, 2016	1.7/7	5.60	2	2	
14	Thursday, July 21, 2016	1.7/7	5.80	1	1	
15	Friday, July 22, 2016	1.6/8	5.39	1	1	
16	Sunday, July 24, 2016	2.0/8	6.35	1	1	
17	Wednesday, July 27, 2016	1.7/7	5.56	2	2	
18	Thursday, July 28, 2016	1.8/7	5.79	1	1	
19^{1}	Sunday, July 31, 2016	1.7/7	5.87	1	1	
20	Wednesday, August 3, 2016	1.8/7	5.84	1	2	
21	Thursday, August 4, 2016	1.9/7	6.04	1	1	
22	Sunday, August 7, 2016	1.6/5	5.25	1	2	
23	Wednesday, August 10, 2016	1.8/7	5.91	2	2	
24	Thursday, August 11, 2016	1.7/6	5.18	1	2	
25	Sunday, August 14, 2016	1.8/6	5.60	1	2	
26	Wednesday, August 17, 2016	1.8/7	5.91	2	2	
27	Thursday, August 18, 2016	1.8/6	5.37	1	2	
28	Friday, August 19, 2016	1.3/6	4.34	2	3	
29	Sunday, August 21, 2016	1.9/7	5.97	2	3	
30	Wednesday, August 24, 2016	2.1/8	6.47	1	1 (tie)	
31	Thursday, August 25, 2016	1.9/7	6.09	1	1	
32	Sunday, August 28, 2016	2.1/8	6.76	1	1	
33	Wednesday, August 31, 2016	1.9/7	6.29	1	2	
34	Thursday, September 1, 2016	1.6/6	4.94	1	1	
35	Sunday, September 4, 2016	1.4/6	5.15	1	2	
36	Wednesday, September 7, 2016	1.9/7	6.14	2	3	
37	Thursday, September 8, 2016	1.7/6	5.65	1	3	
38	Sunday, September 11, 2016	1.8/6	6.21	2	6	
39	Tuesday, September 13, 2016	1.8/7	6.35	2	2	
40	Wednesday, September 14, 2016	1.8/7	6.11	2	2	
41	Friday, September 16, 2016	1.2/6	4.60	1	1	
42	Wednesday, September 21, 2016	2.0/7	6.32	1	6	

- ^Note 1: Episode 19 became delayed to 8:43 PM ET due to the PGA Tour golf event running long.
