= Off the Block with Ross and Marissa =

- Off the Block with Ross and Marissa title card
- Also known as: Off the Block
- Genre: Reality; Talk show; Aftershow
- Presented by: Ross Mathews; Marissa Jaret Winokur; Lance Bass; Frankie Grande; Mark McGrath
- Country of origin: United States
- Original language: English
- No. of seasons: 1
- No. of episodes: 14

Production
- Executive producer: Allison Grodner
- Running time: 22–104 minutes

Original release
- Network: Facebook Watch
- Release: June 29 – September 26, 2018

Related
- Big Brother (American TV series)

Off the Block with Ross and Marissa (often shortened to just Off the Block) is a reality aftershow and spin-off of Big Brother hosted by Ross Mathews and Marissa Jaret Winokur who were both HouseGuests on the first season of Celebrity Big Brother. The show premiered on June 29, 2018 as a Facebook Watch exclusive. The series did not return as a companion to Big Brother 21.

== Development ==
The first aftershow attempted by CBS began in 2004 with House Calls: The Big Brother Talk Show The series primarily featured a discussion about events occurring in the Big Brother house. House Calls aired every weekday alongside new episodes of Big Brother from Big Brother 5 until its cancellation prior to Big Brother 11 in 2008. The next companion show began in 2012 with former Big Brother HouseGuest Jeff Schroeder known as Big Brother: Live Chat. The show aired each week following the live eviction when Schroeder would interview the evicted HouseGuests. However, On August 10, 2017 Schroeder announced that he was moving to Colorado and would no longer be able to host the show. Ahead of Big Brother 20 it was announced by Julie Chen Moonves on Twitter that Celebrity Big Brother 1 runner-up and winner Ross Mathews and Marissa Jaret Winokur would be filling in the gap left by Schroeder with a new show called Off the Block.

== Production ==
Due to the format of Big Brother, beginning with episode 7, the hosts are required to keep certain aspects of the parent series confidential from the evicted HouseGuest in an effort to keep their Jury vote unbiased.

=== Broadcast ===
The show airs on Fridays the day after live eviction episodes of Big Brother 20 and is a Facebook Watch exclusive. The first-season finale is set to air live immediately following the Big Brother 20 finale from the House's backyard featuring interviews from the season's HouseGuests.

=== Format ===
Each episode generally consists of the following format in order:

1. BB Breakdown: Ross and Marissa discuss the biggest moments from the recent episodes of Big Brother.
2. Live Feed Exclusive: An exclusive highlight from the Big Brother Live Feeds that is only shown on Off the Block.
3. Off the Block Interview: Ross and Marissa interview the most recently evicted HouseGuests.
4. Prediction Predicament: Ross and Marissa make their own predictions based on what is currently happening inside the Big Brother house.

== Episodes ==
No. in season	Title	Original release date	Guest(s)
1	"Off the Block Premiere"	June 29, 2018	N/A
Ross and Marissa review episodes one and two of Big Brother 20 including the first safety competition, the first Head of Household competition, and the first nomination ceremony. They also make their own predictions about which HouseGuests they think will win the season.
2	"Off the Block: Episode 2 - Steve"	July 6, 2018	Julie Chen Moonves and Steve Arienta (Note: Julie Chen appeared in a pre-recorded segment that was filmed outside of regular filming.)
Ross and Marissa review episodes three, four, and five of Big Brother 20 including the BB App Store, the Power of Veto competition, and new showmances. They also interview Steve, the most recently evicted HouseGuest, and Julie Chen also makes her own prediction on who she thinks will win the season.
3	"Off the Block: Episode 3 - Swaggy C"	July 13, 2018	Chris "Swaggy C" Williams
Ross and Marissa review episodes six, seven, and eight of Big Brother 20 including the Veto Meeting, Swaggy C's eviction speech, and the end of the third Head of Household competition. Meanwhile, Swaggy C is interviewed following his recent eviction.
4	"Off the Block: Episode 4 - Winston"	July 20, 2018	Winston Hines
Ross and Lance review episodes nine, ten, and eleven of Big Brother 20 including what happened following the Nomination Ceremony, the Veto Meeting, and Rockstar's confrontation post-eviction. Following his eviction, Ross and Lance interview Winston. Also, Lance includes his prediction on who he thinks will win the season. Absent: Marissa Jaret Winokur (Note: Marissa Jaret Winokur was absent from episode 4 due to an outside project. However, she appeared in a voice only role recorded outside of regular filming); Guest co-host: Lance Bass
5	"Off the Block: Episode 5 - Kaitlyn"	July 27, 2018	Rachel Reilly, Jessie Godderz, Josh Martinez, Jessica Graf, Cody Nickson, Nicole Franzel, Kaitlyn Herman, and Zev Winokur Miller (Note: Rachel Reilly, Jessie Gooderz, Josh Martinez, Jessica Graf, Cody Nickson, and Nicole Franzel all appeared in pre-recorded segments that were filmed outside of regular filming)
Ross and Marissa review episodes twelve, thirteen, and fourteen of Big Brother 20 including the beginning of Sam's HoH reign, the nomination ceremony, and a fight between Kaitlyn and Faysal. Kaitlyn, the most recently evicted HouseGuest, is then interviewed by Ross and Marissa. Meanwhile, Big Brother alumni give their thoughts on who they would've already evicted from the house.
6	"Off the Block: Episode 6 - Rachel"	August 3, 2018	Rachel Swindler and Kaitlyn Herman (Note: Ross Mathews and Kaitlyn Herman appeared in a pre-recorded segment that was filmed outside of regular filming.)
Marissa and Frankie review episodes fifteen, sixteen, and seventeen of Big Brother 20 including Brett's eviction speech, and two conversations with the Head of Household. The two then interview Rachel, the most recently evicted HouseGuest. Also, Frankie makes his own prediction on who he thinks will win the season. Absent: Ross Mathews; Guest co-host: Frankie Grande
7	"Off the Block: Episode 7 - Bayleigh"	August 10, 2018	Bayleigh Dayton
Ross and Marissa review episodes eighteen, nineteen, and twenty of Big Brother 20 including Tyler getting nominated as a result of the H@cker competition, the Veto Ceremony, and the fight between Bayleigh and Tyler. Bayleigh, the most recently evicted HouseGuest, is then interviewed.
8	"Off the Block: Episode 8 - Rockstar"	August 17, 2018	Kaitlyn Herman and Angela "Rockstar" Lantry (Note: Kaitlyn Herman appeared in a pre-recorded segment that was filmed outside of regular filming.)
Ross and Marissa review episodes twenty-one, twenty-two, and twenty-three of Big Brother 20 including a conversation between Haeligh and Faysal, a confrontation between Rockstar and Kaycee, and the end of that week's Veto competition. Following her eviction, Ross and Marissa interview Rockstar.
9	"Off the Block: Episode 9 - Scottie"	August 24, 2018	Paul Abrahamian and Scottie Salton
Ross and Marissa along with Paul review episodes twenty-four, twenty-five, and twenty-six of Big Brother 20 including a strategic meeting between Faysal and Sam, Kaitlyn having an emotional breakdown, and a new alliance being formed. Meanwhile, Scottie is interviewed following his recent eviction.
10	"Off the Block: Episode 10 - Faysal"	August 31, 2018	Brandi Glanville, Faysal "Fessy" Shafaat, and Rachel Reilly (Note: Brandi Glanville appeared in a pre-recorded segment that was filmed outside of regular filming.)
Ross and Marissa review episodes twenty-seven, twenty-eight, and twenty-nine of Big Brother 20 including the nomination ceremony, Faysal's eviction speech, and Scottie's return to the house following his Jury Battle Back win. Fessy, the most recently evicted HouseGuest, is then interviewed. Big Brother 13 winner Rachel Reilly then joins Ross and Marissa to discuss the show.
11	"Off the Block: Episode 11 - Scottie (Part 2)"	September 7, 2018	Scottie Salton
Marissa and Mark review episodes thirty, thirty-one, and thirty-two of Big Brother 20 including a conversation between Haleigh and Scottie, as well as Jc and Tyler, and Kaycee's Head of Household win. Also, Mark includes his prediction on who he thinks will win the season. Absent: Ross Mathews. (Note: Ross Mathews and appeared in a pre-recorded segment that was filmed outside of regular filming.); Guest co-host: Mark McGrath
12	"Off the Block: Episode 12 - Haleigh + Brett"	September 14, 2018	Haleigh Broucher and Brett Robinson
13	"Off the Block: Episode 13 - Final 3 Breakdown"	September 21, 2018	Omarosa Manigault Newman and Dr. Will Kirby
14	"Big Brother Finale"	September 26, 2018	All former Big Brother 20 HouseGuests
Ross and Marissa interview all the now former Big Brother 20 HouseGuests, along with a few HouseGuests from other previous seasons, from the backyard of the Big Brother house.
