= Bingham Township, Huron County, Michigan =

Bingham Township, Michigan
- Civil township
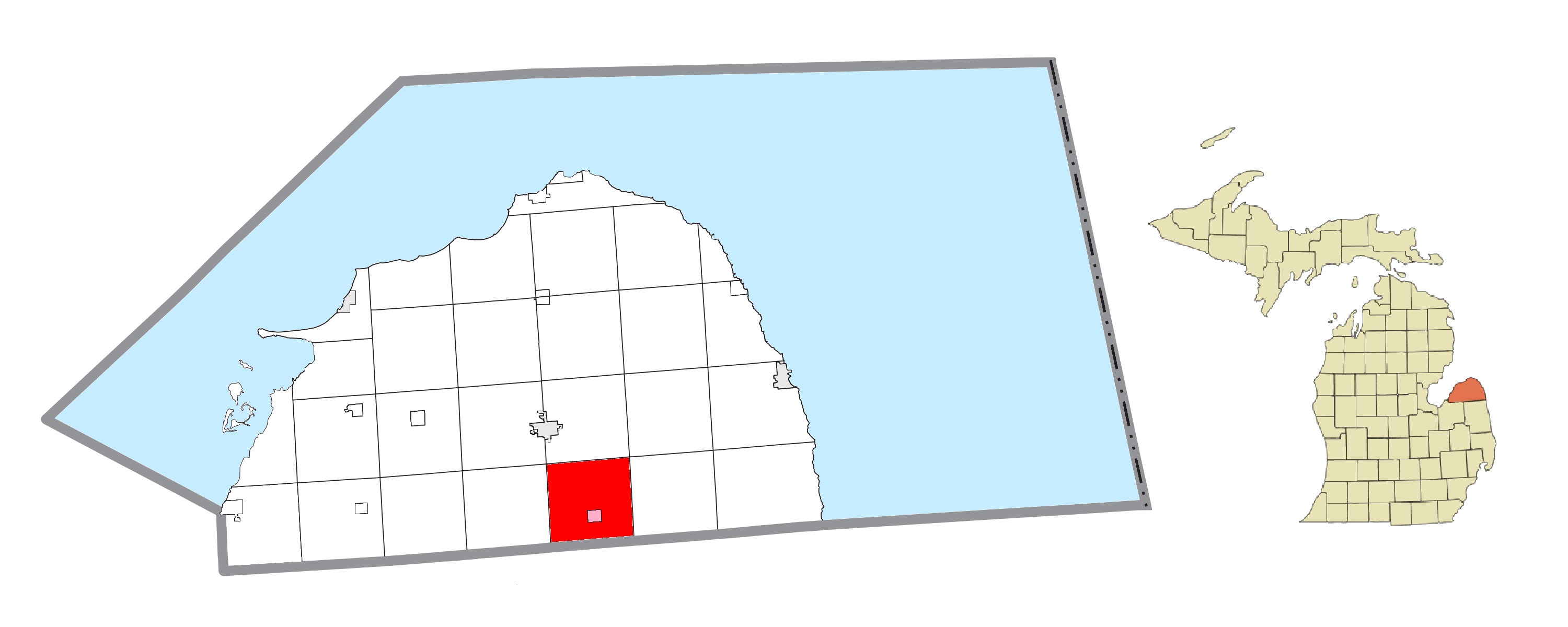
- Location within Huron County (red) and the administered village of Ubly (pink)

- Location within the state of Michigan Bingham Township (the United States)
- Coordinates: 43°43′03″N 82°56′12″W
- Country: United States
- State: Michigan
- County: Huron
- Established: 1863

Area
  - Total: 35.9 sq mi (92.9 km^{2})
  - Land: 35.9 sq mi (92.9 km^{2})
  - Water: 0 sq mi (0.0 km^{2})
- Elevation: 797 ft (243 m)

Population (2020)
  - Total: 1,642
  - Density: 45.8/sq mi (17.7/km^{2})
- Time zone: UTC-5 (Eastern (EST))
  - Summer (DST): UTC-4 (EDT)
- ZIP code(s): 48413, 48475
- Area code: 989
- FIPS code: 26-08420
- GNIS feature ID: 1625938
- Website: https://www.binghamtownship.com/

Bingham Township is a civil township of Huron County in the U.S. state of Michigan. As of the 2020 census, the township population was 1,642. The township is named for Kinsley S. Bingham, a U.S. representative and U.S. senator from and governor of Michigan.

== History ==
Bingham Township was established in 1863.

== Communities ==
The village of Ubly is within the township on M-19.

== Geography ==
According to the United States Census Bureau, the township has a total area of 35.9 square miles (93 km^{2}), all land.

== Demographics ==
As of the census of 2000, there were 1,751 people, 680 households, and 480 families residing in the township. The population density was 48.8 inhabitants per square mile (18.8/km^{2}). There were 721 housing units at an average density of 20.1 per square mile (7.8/km^{2}). The racial makeup of the township was 99.03% White, 0.11% African American, 0.06% Native American, 0.11% Asian, 0.17% from other races, and 0.51% from two or more races. Hispanic or Latino of any race were 0.46% of the population.

There were 680 households, out of which 34.0% had children under the age of 18 living with them, 59.9% were married couples living together, 7.9% had a female householder with no husband present, and 29.3% were non-families. 26.2% of all households were made up of individuals, and 11.5% had someone living alone who was 65 years of age or older. The average household size was 2.55 and the average family size was 3.10.

In the township the population was spread out, with 28.1% under the age of 18, 6.3% from 18 to 24, 30.0% from 25 to 44, 21.5% from 45 to 64, and 14.1% who were 65 years of age or older. The median age was 36 years. For every 100 females, there were 99.2 males. For every 100 females age 18 and over, there were 97.0 males.

The median income for a household in the township was $37,102, and the median income for a family was $49,205. Males had a median income of $31,016 versus $21,515 for females. The per capita income for the township was $17,916. About 6.8% of families and 10.5% of the population were below the poverty line, including 10.2% of those under age 18 and 11.9% of those age 65 or over.
