= Nicole Franzel =

American television personality (born 1992)

- Born: Nicole Ann Franzel; June 30, 1992 (age 34); Ubly, Michigan, U.S.
- Occupations: ER nurse, television personality
- Television: Big Brother 16; Big Brother 18 (winner); The Amazing Race 31; Big Brother 22; Big Brother Reindeer Games (winner)
- Spouse: Victor Arroyo (m. 2021)
- Children: 3

Nicole Ann Franzel-Arroyo (born June 30, 1992) is an American television personality who was born in Ubly, Michigan. She graduated from college as an ER nurse in 2014. She is best known for her appearance on Big Brother 16 in 2014, winning Big Brother 18 in 2016, placing third on Big Brother 22: All Stars in 2020, and winning Big Brother Reindeer Games in 2023.

== Big Brother 16 ==
Upon her entry onto Big Brother 16, Franzel was the second youngest contestant in the house. She applied for the show as a self-proclaimed 'super-fan.' During her season, she earned a reputation for being a potential competition threat, winning the Head of Household role three times in Weeks 3, 6 and 7 (although due to the rules of the Battle of the Block competition, she was dethroned on two of these reigns when her nominees won safety). She also won safety from eviction in Weeks two and five courtesy of the Battle of the Block competition. On Day 56, she was evicted by a vote of 6-0 and became the third member of the jury and the first person in Big Brother history to win the Head of Household title, be dethroned by the Battle of the Block competition and get evicted in the same week. Franzel returned to the house Day 63 after winning the Battle Back competition, where one of the first four jurors would return to the house. On Day 71, Franzel was nominated for a sixth consecutive time and was re-evicted by a vote of 4-0 as the fifth member of the jury. Franzel voted for Derrick Levasseur to win Big Brother 16 on finale night. Franzel was revealed to be among the top three vote-getters for "America's Favorite HouseGuest", alongside Zach Rance and Donny Thompson, the eventual winner of the prize.

Throughout the course of the show, Franzel found love with fellow HouseGuest Hayden Voss. The couple went on to date from September 2014 to early 2016.

== Big Brother 18 ==
After her appearance on Big Brother 16, Franzel later became a returnee contestant alongside James Huling, Da'vonne Rogers and Frank Eudy on Big Brother 18. Franzel earned the power of Head of Household two times during the season, first in week 1 and second in week 10. She also secured the Power of Veto twice, first in week 10 and again in week 12. Unlike in her first season, Franzel opted for a less aggressive strategy to avoid being nominated for eviction, which proved effective as Franzel avoided nomination for eviction until the final four. Ultimately, she survived eviction. Franzel entered finale night having won the second part of the three-part Final Head of Household, advancing her to the third and final competition against Paul Abrahamian. Abrahamian defeated Franzel but chose to bring her to the Final Two. Franzel beat Abrahamian in a 5–4 vote, making her the first female HouseGuest to defeat a male in the Final Two.

During the show's original airing, Franzel and fellow HouseGuest Corey Brooks partook in a showmance. The two dated from September 2016 to December 2016.

== The Amazing Race 31 ==
Franzel competed in The Amazing Race 31 alongside boyfriend-turned-fiance and now husband Victor Arroyo. Season 31 consisted of teams of contestants who had previously appeared on either Survivor, Big Brother or The Amazing Race. They placed fourth of 11 teams overall and were the last team standing who had not previously competed on The Amazing Race.

== Big Brother 22 ==
Franzel (who was referred to as "Nicole F." to avoid confusion with fellow All Stars houseguest Nicole Anthony of Big Brother 21 fame) returned for Big Brother 22: All-Stars alongside 15 other houseguests. Franzel was one of two former winners to enter the house, the other being Big Brother 14 winner Ian Terry. Franzel won her first and only Head of Household and Power of Veto competitions in week 10. Franzel played in the three-part Final Head of Household competitions against Cody Calafiore and Enzo Palumbo, winning the first part. On finale night, Franzel competed against Calafiore in the final competition, where Calafiore defeated Franzel by one point. He opted to evict Franzel, placing her third amongst the other houseguests. Franzel voted for Calafiore to win.

Franzel made history by living in the Big Brother house the most days, with 255 days. Counting the Reindeer Games spin-off, Franzel’s total day count equals 261.

== Big Brother: Reindeer Games ==
Franzel returned for a fourth season, the holiday spin-off Big Brother: Reindeer Games and won against Taylor Hale from season 24 in the final Santa’s Showdown. Franzel’s victory made her the first two-time winner in Big Brother history.

== Personal life ==
Franzel was born and raised in Ubly, Michigan. Franzel attended Ubly High School, where she played on the women's basketball team. Franzel has been in a relationship with fellow Big Brother 18 HouseGuest Victor Arroyo since early 2017, and the two became engaged on September 8, 2018 in a special appearance on an episode of Big Brother 20. On January 11, 2021, Franzel announced on Instagram that she was expecting her first child with Arroyo. Franzel announced on her Coco Caliente podcast that she and Arroyo would wed in March 2021, after postponing the wedding three times due to the COVID-19 pandemic. Franzel and Arroyo were married on March 16, 2021. Their son Victor "Arrow" Arroyo IV was born in July 2021. In February 2026, Nicole gave birth to fraternal twins a son, River David and a daughter Goldie Jen.

== Filmography ==
Year	Title	Role	Note
2014	Big Brother 16	Contestant	7th place
2014	The Bold and the Beautiful	Herself	
2016	Big Brother 18	Contestant	Winner
2016	The Talk	Herself	
2017	Big Brother 19	Herself	Guest competition host
2018	Big Brother 20	Herself	Guest appearance
2019	The Amazing Race 31	Contestant	4th place (with Victor Arroyo)
2020	Big Brother 22	Contestant	3rd place
2023	Big Brother: Reindeer Games	Contestant	Winner

Preceded by Steve Moses	Winner of Big Brother; Season 18	Succeeded by Morgan Willett (BBOTT); Josh Martinez (19)
