= Ubly, Michigan =

- Village
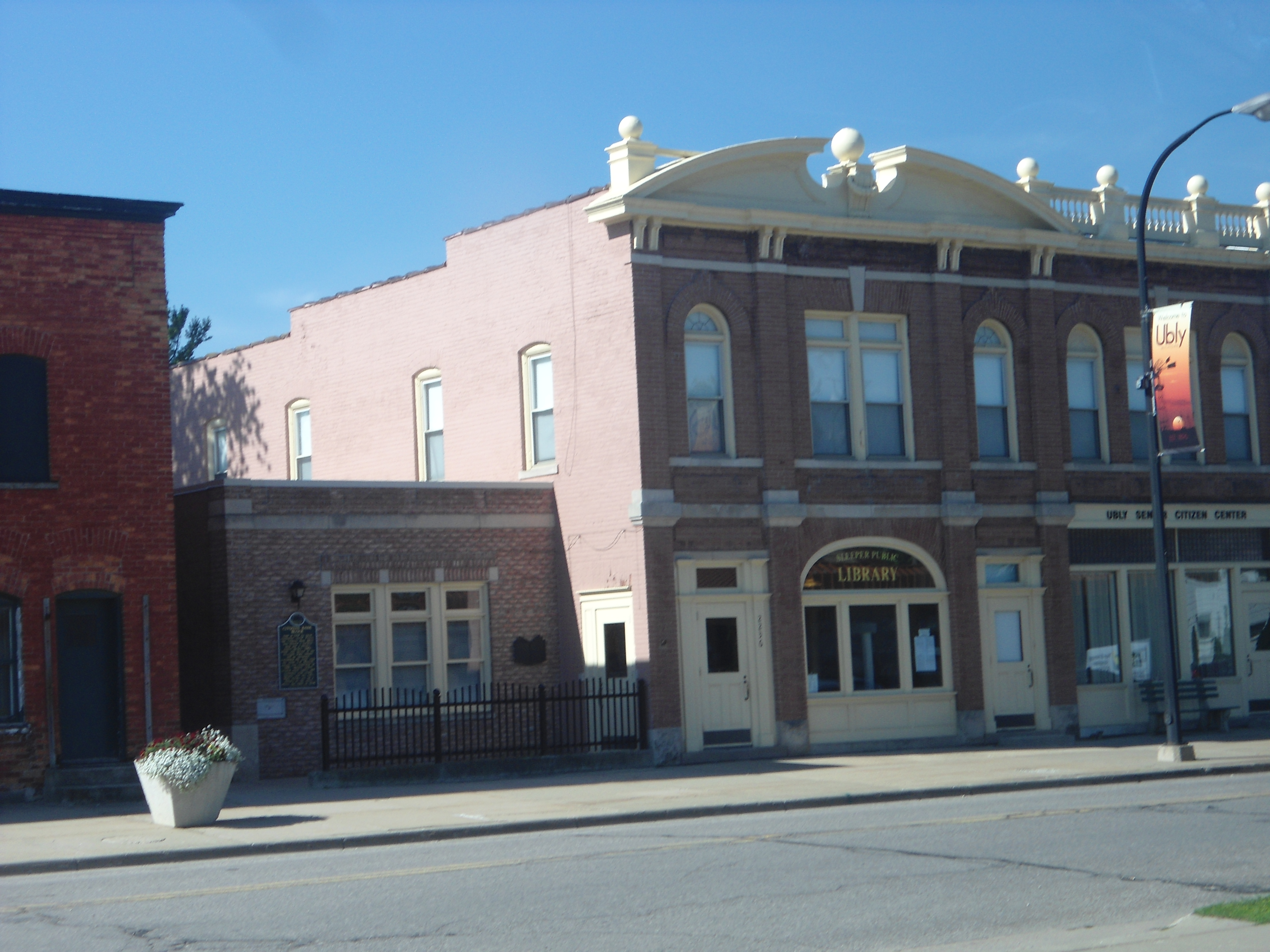
- Sleeper Public Library in Ubly

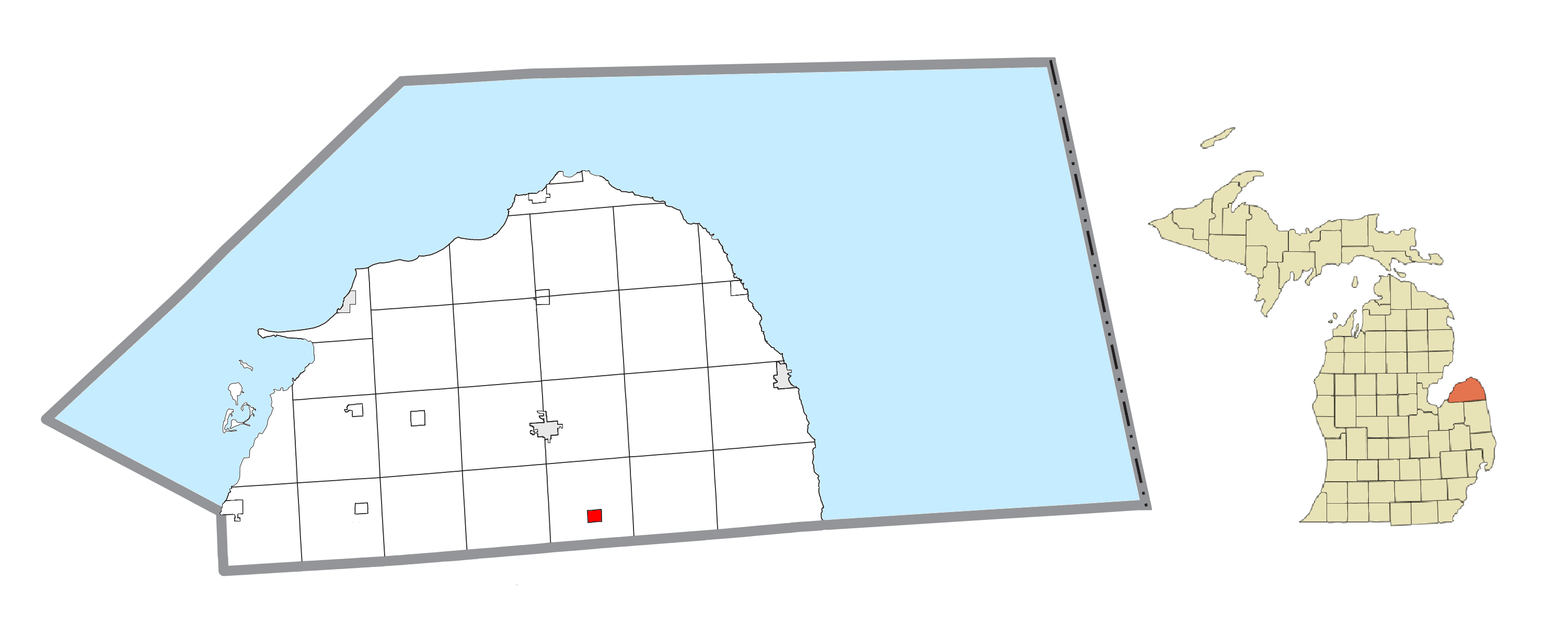
- Location within Huron County

- Location within the state of Michigan
- Coordinates: 43°42′36″N 82°55′54″W
- Country: United States
- State: Michigan
- County: Huron
- Township: Bingham
- Established: 1896

Government
  - Type: Village council
  - President: Jason Nicol

Area
  - Total: 1.32 sq mi (3.41 km^{2})
  - Land: 1.32 sq mi (3.41 km^{2})
  - Water: 0 sq mi (0.00 km^{2})
- Elevation: 784 ft (239 m)

Population (2020)
  - Total: 836
  - Density: 635.7/sq mi (245.45/km^{2})
- Time zone: UTC-5 (Eastern (EST))
  - Summer (DST): UTC-4 (EDT)
- ZIP code(s): 48475
- Area code: 989
- FIPS code: 26-81200
- GNIS feature ID: 1615315
- Website: Official website

Ubly is a village in Huron County in the U.S. state of Michigan. As of the 2020 census, Ubly had a population of 836. The village is within Bingham Township.

== Geography ==
According to the United States Census Bureau, the village has a total area of 1.34 square miles (3.47 km^{2}), all land.

== Demographics ==
Historical population
Census	Pop.	Note	%±
1900	432		—
1910	442		2.3%
1920	455		2.9%
1930	480		5.5%
1940	597		24.4%
1950	743		24.5%
1960	819		10.2%
1970	899		9.8%
1980	862		−4.1%
1990	821		−4.8%
2000	873		6.3%
2010	858		−1.7%
2020	836		−2.6%
U.S. Decennial Census

=== 2010 census ===
As of the census of 2010, there were 858 people, 382 households, and 224 families living in the village. The population density was 640.3 inhabitants per square mile (247.2/km^{2}). There were 418 housing units at an average density of 311.9 per square mile (120.4/km^{2}). The racial makeup of the village was 98.1% White, 0.6% African American, 0.2% Native American, 0.2% Asian, 0.1% from other races, and 0.7% from two or more races. Hispanic or Latino people of any race were 1.0% of the population.

There were 382 households, of which 26.4% had children under the age of 18 living with them, 41.1% were married couples living together, 13.4% had a female householder with no husband present, 4.2% had a male householder with no wife present, and 41.4% were non-families. 36.1% of all households were made up of individuals, and 17.8% had someone living alone who was 65 years of age or older. The average household size was 2.22 and the average family size was 2.88.

The median age in the village was 40.8 years. 23% of residents were under the age of 18; 8.2% were between the ages of 18 and 24; 24.5% were from 25 to 44; 25% were from 45 to 64; and 19.2% were 65 years of age or older. The gender makeup of the village was 46.2% male and 53.8% female.

=== 2000 census ===
As of the census of 2000, there were 873 people, 374 households, and 235 families living in the village. The population density was 989.0/sq mi (381.9/km^{2}). There were 405 housing units at an average density of 458.8/sq mi (177.1/km^{2}). The racial makeup of the village was 98.9% White, 0.2% African American, 0.1% Native American, 0.2% Asian, 0.3% from other races, and 0.2% from two or more races. Hispanic or Latino people of any race were 0.8% of the population.

There were 374 households, out of which 28.1% had children under the age of 18 living with them, 48.9% were married couples living together, 11.5% had a female householder with no husband present, and 36.9% were non-families. 33.4% of all households were made up of individuals, and 14.2% had someone living alone who was 65 years of age or older. The average household size was 2.30 and the average family size was 2.94.

In the village, the population was spread out, with 25.7% under the age of 18, 6.5% from 18 to 24, 29.0% from 25 to 44, 21.6% from 45 to 64, and 17.2% who were 65 years of age or older. The median age was 38 years. For every 100 females, there were 90.2 males. For every 100 females age 18 and over, there were 87.0 males.

The median income for a household in the village was $35,729, and the median income for a family was $49,875. Males had a median income of $31,765 versus $21,875 for females. The per capita income for the village was $18,140. About 8.1% of families and 12.7% of the population were below the poverty line, including 10.7% of those under age 18 and 11.1% of those age 65 or over.

== History ==
Built in 1907 by local contractor David Pierce, the Citizens Bank Block also housed a harness shop and a library. Albert Sleeper (1862–1934), who served in the Michigan State Senate and as governor, co-founded the bank with his uncle A. W. Merrell, taking sole ownership in 1900. Sleeper owned several other banks and extensive real estate. Sleeper and his wife, Mary Moore, set up a library in the space above the bank in 1908.

On February 25, 2004, a wolverine was spotted near Ubly, the first one sighted in Michigan in over 200 years.

== People ==
- Nicole Franzel, contestant on Big Brother 18, Big Brother 16, Big Brother 22: All Stars, and The Amazing Race
