= Paul Abrahamian =

American reality television personality and clothing designer

- Born: Paul Raffi Abrahamian c. 1993 (age 32–33); Los Angeles, California, U.S.
- Occupations: Reality television personality; clothing designer
- Television: Big Brother 18 (runner-up); Big Brother 19 (runner-up); House of Villains season 3

Paul Raffi Abrahamian is an American reality television personality and clothing designer, best known for their appearances in the United States reality television show Big Brother and related spin-offs. They also appeared on the third season of House of Villains.

== Early life and education ==
Abrahamian was born in Los Angeles, California, and raised in the Tarzana neighborhood. They are of Armenian and Russian descent. Abrahamian attended Pepperdine University and received a degree in philosophy.

== Big Brother ==
Abrahamian was first introduced as a new HouseGuest on Big Brother 18 on June 19, 2016. Throughout the season, Abrahamian was nominated for eviction six times. However, on three of those occasions they were removed from the block via the Power of Veto, which they won three times. They also won Head of Household three times during the season, including the final HoH when they chose to take Nicole Franzel to the finale. Franzel was ultimately voted as the winner of the season due to her social game and the jury's disapproval of Abrahamian's abrasive personality, with Abrahamian as the runner-up.

On June 28, 2017, Abrahamian returned to Big Brother in Big Brother 19 as a swap-in contestant on the first day, resulting from a temptation accepted by HouseGuest Kevin Schlehuber. Abrahamian's return to the game was met with both positive and negative reviews from critics. Throughout the season, Abrahamian was only nominated for eviction once, which was immediately canceled via the "Pendant of Protection" power they received upon entry to the house. During the season, they won the title of Head of Household three times and were awarded the Power of Veto five times. They also won the first round of the final Head of Household competition, but lost to Josh Martinez in the final round. Once again in the final two, the jury ultimately selected Martinez as the winner over Abrahamian, due to Abrahamian's poor social game and jury management, as well as their and their alliance's poor treatment of players Cody Nickson and Jessica Graf.

On February 7, 2018, Abrahamian appeared in the series premiere of the Big Brother spin-off Celebrity Big Brother for a special appearance during the first Head of Household competition. On June 27, 2018, Abrahamian appeared in the audience for the premiere episode of Big Brother 20 as a "nod to the show's past". They later appeared on Off the Block with Ross and Marissa, a Big Brother talk and aftershow, on August 24, 2018. Abrahamian appeared in the thirty-third episode of Big Brother 20 to celebrate the engagement of Nicole Franzel and Victor Arroyo.

Abrahamian is the first HouseGuest to reach the final two of Big Brother without winning twice.

== Outside of Big Brother ==
On October 25, 2016, Abrahamian appeared on the CBS show The Bold and the Beautiful. On July 9, 2017, Abrahamian teamed up with former Big Brother contestant Da'Vonne Rogers in the series premiere of the CBS game show Candy Crush as part of a special premiere event featuring past players of Big Brother and Survivor.

== Filmography ==
Year	Title	Role	Notes
2016	Big Brother 18	Themselves	Runner-up
2016	The Bold and the Beautiful	Unnamed Florist	Cameo appearance
2016	Big Brother: Over the Top	Themselves	Special host
2017	Candy Crush	Themselves	Contestant
2017	Big Brother 19	Themselves	Runner-up
2018	Celebrity Big Brother	Themselves	Special appearance
2018	Big Brother 20	Themselves	2 episodes
2018	Off the Block with Ross and Marissa	Themselves	Guest
2026	House of Villains	Themselves	Contestant; 5th Place
2026	Big Brother: Unlocked	Themselves	Guest
2026	Big Brother 28	Themselves	Guest
