= Big Brother 21 =

Big Brother 21 is the twenty-first season of various versions of television show Big Brother and may refer to:

- Big Brother 21 (U.S.), the 2019 edition of the U.S. version
- Big Brother Brasil 21, the 2021 edition of the Brazilian version
- Big Brother 21 (UK), the 2024 edition of the British version
