= Big Brother 20 (American season) =

Season of American reality television series

Coordinates: 34°8′40.12″N 118°23′20.71″W

Big Brother
- Season 20
- Digital cover art for Big Brother 20
- Hosted by: Julie Chen
- No. of days: 99
- No. of houseguests: 16
- Winner: Kaycee Clark
- Runner-up: Tyler Crispen
- America's Favorite HouseGuest: Tyler Crispen
- Companion shows: Off the Block; Big Brother: After Dark
- No. of episodes: 40

Release
- Original network: CBS
- Original release: June 27 – September 26, 2018

Additional information
- Filming dates: June 20 – September 26, 2018

Season chronology
- ← Previous; Season 19 Next → Season 21

Big Brother 20 is the 20th season of the American reality television series Big Brother. It is based upon the Dutch series of the same name.

It was renewed in August 2016 as part of a double renewal for seasons 19 and 20. Julie Chen, credited as Julie Chen Moonves from episode 35 onwards, returned as host.

Sixteen new competitors, known as HouseGuests, were announced to be competing and their identities were released in June 2018. Each week in the game, HouseGuests compete in a series of competitions to win power and safety, they then vote to eliminate, or "evict", one of their own until there are only two remaining. In the finale episode, previous House Guests vote on who they think they should win the game, with the House Guest who receives the most votes being declared the winner.

The season featured a technology theme. It premiered on June 27, 2018 on CBS in the United States and concluded on September 26, 2018. The season also received many controversies and criticisms throughout the season, but received mostly positive viewing figures. Despite an uncertain future for the show, CBS began accepting applications for a future season in September 2018.

After 99 days in the Big Brother House, Kaycee Clark became the winner of Big Brother in a 5–4 vote over Tyler Crispen. Crispen was also named America's Favorite HouseGuest.

== Format ==
Big Brother follows a group of contestants, known as HouseGuests, who live inside a custom-built house outfitted with cameras and microphones recording their every move 24 hours a day. The HouseGuests are sequestered with no contact with the outside world. During their stay, the HouseGuests share their thoughts on their day-to-day lives inside the house in a private room known as the Diary Room.

Each week, the HouseGuests compete in competitions in order to win power and safety inside the house. At the start of each week, the HouseGuests compete in a Head of Household (abbreviated as "HOH") competition. The winner of the HoH competition is immune from eviction and selects two HouseGuests to be nominated for eviction. Six HouseGuests are then selected to compete in the Power of Veto (abbreviated as "PoV") competition: the reigning HoH, the nominees, and three other HouseGuests chosen by random draw. The winner of the PoV competition has the right to either revoke the nomination of one of the nominated HouseGuests or leave them as is. If the veto winner uses this power, the HoH must immediately nominate another HouseGuest for eviction. The PoV winner is also immune from being named as the replacement nominee.

On eviction night, all HouseGuests vote to evict one of the nominees, though the Head of Household and the nominees are not allowed to vote. This vote is conducted in the privacy of the Diary Room. In the event of a tie, the Head of Household casts the tie-breaking vote. The nominee with the most votes is evicted from the house.

The last nine evicted HouseGuests comprise the Jury and are sequestered in a separate location following their eviction and ultimately decide the winner of the season. The Jury is only allowed to see the competitions and ceremonies that include all of the remaining HouseGuests; they are not shown any interviews or other footage that might include strategy or details regarding nominations.

The viewing public is able to award an additional prize of $25,000 by choosing "America's Favorite HouseGuest". All evicted HouseGuests are eligible to win this award except for those who either voluntarily leave or are forcibly removed for rule violations.

=== Format changes and additions ===
This season's main format and changes centered on technology. BB did something similar in season 26 when the twist was focused on AI.

==== BB App Store ====
For the first three weeks, viewers were asked a series of questions about their opinions on the remaining House Guests. The House Guest who was named in the most overall answers was deemed the "top trending" House Guest of the week and earned a "Power App", which would give them an advantage in the game, while the House Guest who was answered the least was deemed "least trending" was given a "Crap App", which gave them a punishment. Once HouseGuests received an app, they were no longer eligible to receive one in the future.

Week	Top trending	Power App	Status	Least trending	Crap App
1	Sam	Bonus Life; To be used immediately after a HouseGuest is evicted from the house, this power gave that HouseGuest a chance to return to the game via a competition. This power had to be used in the first three evictions, or else the fourth evicted HouseGuest would automatically be given the chance to return.	Used	Fessy	Hamazon; The HouseGuest was routinely given packages of ham, which they had to consume. (As Faysal was Muslim, a vegetarian ham substitute was used.)
2	Tyler	The Cloud; The HouseGuest had the power to make themselves immune from nomination during one Nomination or Veto Ceremony of their choice.	Not used	Rachel	Yell! For 24 hours, an angry reviewer was unleashed into the house at random times to loudly give the HouseGuest feedback on their existence.
3	Bayleigh	Identity Theft; The HouseGuest could secretly replace the HoH's nominations with two of their own. The HoH still had power over the replacement nominations.	Not used (Evicted)	Haleigh	Read It! Throughout the week, the HouseGuest had to wear a costume and read Hamlet in a Shakespearean accent. This punishment continued until the entire play had been read.

==== H@cker Competition ====
On Day 44, following Rachel's eviction, a new twist was unleashed on the HouseGuests called the "H@cker Competition". It lets one HouseGuest hack the game for a week. After the nominations, all of the HouseGuests compete in a competition at the same time in different rooms, making the winner anonymous to the other HouseGuests. The winner of the competition is able to "hack" the game in three different ways:

- First, they can replace one of the Head of Household's nominations and change it to someone of their choosing.
- Second, they get to select one of the three participants chosen for the Power of Veto competition.
- Finally, they can nullify one vote at the live eviction.

Week	H@cker	Nominations		Veto Player	Nullified Eviction Vote
Week	H@cker	Saved	Nominated	Veto Player	Nullified Eviction Vote
6	Haleigh	Scottie	Tyler	Kaycee	Tyler
7	Kaycee	Kaycee	Rockstar	Tyler	Fessy

==== Jury Battleback ====
The first four Jury members had the opportunity to battle each other for a chance to return to the game. The competition between Bayleigh, Rockstar, Scottie, and Fessy aired on August 30, 2018 in episode 29 following the live eviction. Scottie was the winner and returned to the game.

== HouseGuests ==
The HouseGuests were announced on Monday, June 18 at 7 AM PDT through the CBS website. Among the HouseGuests was Miss Missouri USA 2017 Bayleigh Dayton.

Name	Age	Occupation	Residence	Day entered	Result
Kaycee Clark	30	Pro football player	Tempe, Arizona	1	Winner; Day 99
Tyler Crispen	23	Lifeguard	Hilton Head, South Carolina	1	Runner-up; Day 99
Joseph Charles "JC" Mounduix	28	Professional dancer	West Hollywood, California	1	Evicted; Day 99
Angela Rummans	26	Fitness model	Playa Vista, California	1	Evicted; Day 93
Sam Bledsoe	27	Welder	Stuarts Draft, Virginia	1	Evicted; Day 91
Brett Robinson	25	Cybersecurity engineer	Charlestown, Massachusetts	1	Evicted; Day 86
Haleigh Broucher	21	College student	College Station, Texas	1	Evicted; Day 86
Scottie Salton	26	Shipping manager	Chicago, Illinois	72	Evicted; Day 79
Scottie Salton	26	Shipping manager	Chicago, Illinois	1	Evicted; Day 65
Faysal "Fessy" Shafaat	26	Substitute teacher	Orlando, Florida	1	Evicted; Day 72
Angela "Rockstar" Lantry	34	Stay-at-home mom	Columbia, Maryland	1	Evicted; Day 58
Bayleigh Dayton	25	Flight attendant	Atlanta, Georgia	1	Evicted; Day 51
Rachel Swindler	29	Vegas entertainer	Las Vegas, Nevada	1	Evicted; Day 44
Kaitlyn Herman	24	Life coach	Encino, California	1	Evicted; Day 37
Winston Hines	28	Medical sales rep	Bowling Green, Kentucky	1	Evicted; Day 30
Christopher "Swaggy C" Williams	23	Day trader	Bridgeport, Connecticut	1	Evicted; Day 23
Steve Arienta	40	Former undercover cop	Wanaque, New Jersey	1	Evicted; Day 16

=== Other appearances ===
The cast of the twentieth season of Big Brother. Top: Kaycee, Fessy, Rockstar, Swaggy C and Steve Middle: Scottie, Kaitlyn, Brett, Bayleigh, Winston, Sam, Tyler and Haleigh Bottom: Rachel, JC and Angela

All evicted HouseGuests appeared on the Facebook Watch exclusive Off the Block with Ross and Marissa for an extended interview following their evictions. Tyler Crispen appeared on the second episode of TKO: Total Knock Out as a contestant.

In 2019, Kaycee Clark, Tyler Crispen, Bayleigh Dayton, Kaitlyn Herman, and Swaggy C Williams all appeared on Big Brother 21 to host separate Head of Household and Power of Veto competitions. Clark and Crispen appeared alongside JC Mounduix in the penultimate episode of Big Brother 21 to give their thoughts on the season and who they thought would win. In 2020, both Crispen and Dayton returned to compete on Big Brother: All-Stars.

Swaggy C Williams, Bayleigh Dayton, Winston Hines, and Brett Robinson all filmed a promotional video for Love Island, which aired during Big Brother 21. Hines then appeared as a contestant on the first season.

In 2020, Kaycee Clark, Fessy Shafaat, Bayleigh Dayton, and Swaggy C Williams appeared on The Challenge: Total Madness. Clark and Shafaat returned for The Challenge: Double Agents, The Challenge: Spies, Lies & Allies and The Challenge: Ride or Dies. In 2024, Clark returned for the milestone 40th season, The Challenge 40: Battle of the Eras.

In 2022, Angela Rummans appeared on the first season of The Challenge: USA. In 2023, Faysal Shafaat and Tyler Crispen appeared on the second season. Also in 2023, Kaycee Clark competed on The Challenge: World Championship. In 2025, Shafaat competed on the fifth season of The Challenge: All Stars.

In 2020, Bayleigh Dayton and Swaggy C Williams appeared on the TLC reality TV show Say Yes to the Dress.

In 2022, Brett Robinson competed on the fifth season of the Netflix reality competition series The Circle.

In 2025, Clark made a surprise appearance on Big Brother 27 as part of a twist to compete in the Week 2 Power of Veto competition on behalf of houseguest Keanu Soto. Tyler Crispen appeared later in the season to host the White Locust competition.

In 2026, Shafaat appeared as "Mayhem" on American Gladiators.

== Episodes ==
No. overall	No. in season	Title	Day(s)	Original release date	U.S. viewers (millions)	Rating/share (18–49)
Week 1
667	1	"Episode 1"	Day 1	June 27, 2018	5.33	1.5/7
Sixteen new HouseGuests entered the newest version of the Big Brother House. After getting settled in the HouseGuests began formal introductions. Following formal introductions Julie informed the HouseGuests that the theme for the summer is "Big Brother Technology" and the first competition of the summer began.: Safety Competition – Part 1 ("The Trash Folder"): (Note: Only eight HouseGuests participated in this competition) There are 7 folders hidden inside of the "supercomputer". 6 of the folders are labeled "escape" however, 1 of them is labeled "escape and play". Each HouseGuest must collect a folder as fast as possible. The one who finds the "escape and play" folder moves on to face the winner of part 2 in part 3 of the competition. The HouseGuest who does not collect a folder suffers a punishment. Angela was the winner and Kaycee was the loser.; Safety Competition – Part 2 ("HouseGuest CAPTCHA"): The HouseGuests must collect block letters from the pit below their tether which is constantly raising and lowering. Each HouseGuest must collect the correct letters and be the first one to spell "HouseGuest" on their platform. The first HouseGuest to correctly collect and spell "HouseGuest" moved on to face the winner of part 1 in part 3 of the competition. The last remaining HouseGuest will suffer a punishment. Swaggy C was the winner and Sam was the loser.; Safety Competition – Part 3 ("Surfing the BB Web"): (Note: Only two HouseGuests participated in this competition) The winners of part 1 and part 2 faced off in this competition and must "surf" the web. The winner of this competition will have the opportunity to keep 8 HouseGuests including themselves safe from the first eviction. Swaggy C was the winner.; Following the competitions Julie informed Swaggy C that, of the four original groups that moved into the Big Brother House, he must keep two of the groups safe. The punishments for the two losing HouseGuests were revealed. Kaycee received the "Pinwheel of Doom" punishment and is forced to wear a pinwheel unitard. Whenever the pinwheel spins, she must stay in the room that she is currently in until it stops spinning. Sam is forced to occasionally play the game as a robot; when the words "Robot online" are announced, she plays the game as a robot, but when the words "Robot offline" are announced, she plays the game as a human. Both punishments are in effect until the first live eviction. Swaggy C chose to keep groups 3 and 4 safe from eviction.
668	2	"Episode 2"	Days 2–5	June 28, 2018	5.13	1.4/6
Head of Household ("Microchip Mayhem"): When the competition starts HouseGuests must cross their beam and collect a "deletion dot". Once they have collected one they must cross back, place it inside another HouseGuests' tube, and repeat. When a HouseGuest has 10 deletion dots inside their tube, they are eliminated from the competition. Tyler was the winner and became the first HoH of the season.; On Day 5, Tyler nominated Sam and Steve for eviction.
669	3	"Episode 3"	Days 5–9	July 1, 2018	4.78	1.2/6
Following nominations, Sam has a one on one conversation with the other HouseGuests. As the HoH, Tyler was forced to choose the first four Have-Nots of the season. Kaitlyn volunteered and Tyler chose Brett, Scottie, and Winston to be the remaining Have-Nots. Each week in the new BB App Store the most trending HouseGuest will receive a power to help them in the Big Brother game. However, the least trending HouseGuest each week will receive a punishment. Each HouseGuest may only receive a power in the BB App Store once. Faysal was the least trending HouseGuest and received the Hamazon punishment; throughout the week Hamazon will deliver a fresh plate of ham, which Faysal must eat in full. Meanwhile, Sam was the top trending HouseGuest and received Bonus Life power, this gives Sam or a HouseGuest of her choice the chance to return to the game if evicted. The power is only good through the first four evictions and if Samantha does not use it by the third eviction, then the fourth evicted HouseGuest automatically has the chance to return to the game.
670	4	"Episode 4"	Days 9–12	July 4, 2018	3.95	0.9/5
The HouseGuests begin speculating who received the Power App, as Faysal receives non-stop deliveries of Hamazon Swine.: Power of Veto ("Going Viral"): The competition was played in five rounds. In each round, the losing competitor is eliminated from the competition. The competitors were Tyler, Sam, Steve, Scottie, Swaggy C, and Faysal.; Stage 1 ("Snake Bite Pit"): When "action" is said, the competitors must reach into a snake pit and pull out a like icon. Once they have a like icon, they must place it in their corresponding score card. When a HouseGuest has three like icons in their score card, they are finished with that stage. The last HouseGuest who does not have three like icons or the HouseGuest with the fewest like icons after five minutes is eliminated. Scottie was eliminated following Stage 1.; Stage 2 ("Polar Plunge"): When the competition begins, the HouseGuests must plunge to the bottom of an Arctic pool and retrieve a like icon. Once they have a like icon, they must place it in their corresponding score card. When a HouseGuest has ten like icons in their score card, they are finished with that stage. The last HouseGuest who does not have 10 like icons is eliminated. Swaggy C was eliminated following Stage 2.; Stage 3 ("Human Canvas"): When "action" is said, the HouseGuests must stand on a post as they are fired at with paint balls. When told to do so, they must move forward to a smaller post. The first HouseGuest to touch the ground is eliminated from the competition. Steve was eliminated following Stage 3.; Stage 4 ("Electricity in the Air"): When the competition begins, the HouseGuests must transfer balls one at a time using their device from the start to their scoreboard. However, the HouseGuests are shocked with shock collars while attempting to transport their balls. When a HouseGuest collects 10 balls, they are finished. The last HouseGuest remaining is eliminated from the competition. Sam was eliminated following Stage 4.; Stage 5 ("Sloda"): When the competition begins, the HouseGuests goal are to find and match the top three flavors to "Sloda", a soda version of slop. Once done, they must place them in the corresponding order. The first HouseGuest to place the three flavors in the corresponding order will win the Power of Veto. Faysal was the winner and received the Power of Veto.; At the Veto Meeting, Faysal chose not to use the PoV, thus keeping the nominations the same.
671	5	"Episode 5"	Days 12–16	July 5, 2018	4.96	1.3/6
Ahead of the first eviction, with a split house, alliances begin attempting to secure votes for their side. On Day 16, by a vote of 7-6, Steve was the first HouseGuest to be evicted from the Big Brother House.: Head of Household ("Land a Job"): When the competition begins, the HouseGuests must step up to the launch pad and launch their ball into the new town of "San Brosé" The building the ball lands on has a corresponding salary. The HouseGuest with the highest salary after everyone has launched their balls became the new HoH. Kaitlyn was the winner and became the second HoH of the season.
Week 2
672	6	"Episode 6"	Days 16–17	July 8, 2018	5.11	1.3/6
Following the HoH competition, Kaitlyn begins strategizing her nominations. The BB App Store opens for business again. Rachel was the least trending, while Tyler was the most trending HouseGuest. Rachel received the "Yell!" Crap App; periodically throughout the next 24 hours, an angry reviewer was released into the house to give her feedback. Tyler received "The Cloud" Power App; this gives him the opportunity to make himself immune from one nomination ceremony of veto meeting throughout the next eight weeks. Kaitlyn nominated Scottie and Winston for eviction.
673	7	"Episode 7"	Days 17–20	July 11, 2018	5.43	1.5/7
Following nominations, the HouseGuests prepared to compete in the Power of Veto competition The HouseGuests picked to compete in the Veto competition were Kaitlyn, Scottie, Winston, Faysal, Rachel, and Tyler. The HouseGuests then received a visit from Big Brother 19 HouseGuests and winners of the 30th season of The Amazing Race, Jessica Graf and Cody Nickson, who hosted the Power of Veto competition.: Power of Veto ("HouseGuestsOnly.com"): When the competition begins, players must review dating profiles of former HouseGuests. Once reviewed, they must place the former HouseGuests in their ideal dating location. Once all former HouseGuests are placed, they must hit the buzzer. If all former HouseGuests are correctly placed, their time gets locked in; however, if they are incorrect, they must try again until they are all correctly placed. If a HouseGuest takes longer than 20 minutes to correctly place all HouseGuests, they are automatically eliminated. The HouseGuest with the fastest time won the Power of Veto. Tyler was the winner with a time of five minutes and 29 seconds.; Rachel then begins receiving visits from her angry reviewer as a result of her Crap App from the BB App Store. At the Veto Ceremony, Tyler chose to use the PoV to remove Scottie from the block. On Day 20, Kaitlyn then named Swaggy C as the replacement nominee.
674	8	"Episode 8"	Days 20–23	July 12, 2018	5.32	1.5/6
Following the Veto Ceremony, Swaggy C and Winston both begin campaigning for votes. The HouseGuests then cast their votes on who the want to evict. On Day 23, by a vote of 8-4, Swaggy C was the second HouseGuest to be evicted from the Big Brother House.: Head of Household ("Product Launch"): The competing HouseGuests watched two videos about product launches for "Pineapple, Inc.". Julie then asked the HouseGuests a series of questions where the answer is either true or false. If a HouseGuest answered incorrectly, they were eliminated from the competition. The last HouseGuest remaining became the next Head of Household. If two HouseGuests remain at the end, the game would enter tiebreaker mode. Rachel and Scottie remained at the end. Both HouseGuests were given whiteboards and the answer to the final question was a number. The HouseGuest who came closest to the correct answer without going over would become the next HoH. If both HouseGuests went over, the one who was closest to the number would be the winner. Scottie was the winner and became the third HoH of the season.
Week 3
675	9	"Episode 9"	Days 23–24	July 15, 2018	5.19	1.4/6
Following Swaggy C's eviction, the BB App Store opened for the final time. Inside, Haleigh was the least trending HouseGuest and received the "Read It!" Crap App. When told to read, Haleigh must dress up in a costume, report to a specified room, and read Hamlet until told to stop. This punishment will continue until the entire book is read. Meanwhile, Bayleigh was the most trending HouseGuest and received the "Identity Theft" Power App. This power allows her to secretly choose the nominees for the week. On Day 24, Scottie nominated Brett and Winston for eviction.
676	10	"Episode 10"	Days 24–27	July 18, 2018	5.24	1.4/6
Following nominations, the HouseGuests picked players for the Veto Competition. The competitors were Scottie, Brett, Winston, Tyler, Rachel, and Rockstar.: Power of Veto ("Mamma Mia! Madness"): When the competition begins, the HouseGuests must grab onto their disco ball and spin 15 times to set 30 seconds on their clock. They must then run across the playing field and build a tower of champagne glasses. Before the clock runs out, they must run back and spin again to get another 30 seconds. If their clock runs out before they make it back, they are eliminated from the competition. However, if they volunteer to be a Have-Not for the week, they may re-enter the competition. The first HouseGuest to successfully build their tower won the Power of Veto and a trip for two to the Greek islands. Scottie was the winner and received the PoV.; Meanwhile, Haleigh begins suffering from her Crap App punishment. Brett and Winston begin campaigning to Scottie in an attempt to get him to take one of them off of the block. Scottie informs Kaitlyn of their secret meeting, causing confrontation throughout the house. At the Veto Ceremony, Scottie chose not to use the PoV, thus keeping his nominations the same.
677	11	"Episode 11"	Days 27–30	July 19, 2018	5.58	1.6/7
Following the Veto Ceremony, each side of the house begins looking for votes. The HouseGuests voted in the live vote and eviction. On Day 30, by a vote of 6-5, Winston was the third HouseGuest to be evicted from the Big Brother House. Following Winston's eviction, a major confrontation occurs between Rockstar and Brett due to his eviction speech which took place on Rockstar's daughter's birthday.: Head of Household ("Out on a Limb"): (Note: This Head of Household competition began in episode 11 on Day 30. However, completion was not broadcast on television until episode 12.) In this competition, each participating HouseGuest must stand on a peg attached to their tree and hold on as long as possible. Throughout the competition, the trees move and water is sprayed on the HouseGuests. The last HouseGuest to remain on their tree will become the next Head of Household.
Week 4
678	12	"Episode 12"	Days 27, 30–31	July 22, 2018	5.45	1.5/6
Head of Household ("Out on a Limb"): During the competition, honey and feathers also begin to spray at the HouseGuests. Sam was the last HouseGuest remaining on their tree and became the fourth HoH of the season.; Tensions begin to flare throughout the house between different HouseGuests following the eviction. The episode also covered a major controversy between HouseGuests JC and Bayleigh following an incident where JC used the n-word in a conversation which Bayleigh took as offensive. On Day 31, Sam nominated Haleigh and Kaitlyn for eviction.
679	13	"Episode 13"	Days 31–34	July 25, 2018	5.69	1.5/6
Sam's nomination reasoning begins causing friction throughout the house. The HouseGuests then picked players for the Power of Veto competition. The competitors were Sam, Haleigh, Kaitlyn, JC, Rockstar, and Faysal. Former Big Brother HouseGuest Rachel Reilly entered the house to host the PoV competition.: Power of Veto ("Chop, Bonk, Spank"): Inspired by Big Brother 19's "Punch, Slap, Kick" and sponsored by the fictional "Bro Fund Me", HouseGuests must stand on their target as Rachel randomly played sequences which chomped, bonked, and spanked them. Rachel then asked the HouseGuests a question based on the sequence. Each correct answer earned the HouseGuest a point. The HouseGuest with the most points at the end of the game was the winner. After seven rounds, Faysal was the winner with seven points and received the Power of Veto.; At the Veto Ceremony, Fessy chose to use the PoV on Haleigh. Sam chose Rockstar to become the replacement nominee. She then informed the rest of the HouseGuests about her Bonus Life Power App.
680	14	"Episode 14"	Days 34–37	July 26, 2018	5.44	1.5/6
Following the Veto Ceremony, Faysal gets caught in the middle of Haleigh and Kaitlyn. The HouseGuests then participated in the live vote eviction by voting on who they wished to evict from the house. On Day 37, by a vote of 9-1, Kaitlyn was the fourth HouseGuest to be evicted from the Big Brother House. However, due to Sam not using her Bonus Life Power App, the evictee was automatically offered chance to win re-entry into the game.: Bonus Life Competition ("Outside the House"): In the Bonus Life Competition, Kaitlyn must disassemble the life-sized puzzle of herself and must reassemble the puzzle on the opposite side of the fictional house within two minutes and 30 seconds. When she believes the puzzle is correctly built, she must hit the buzzer. If the puzzle is correctly built, she will win re-entry into the game; however, if it is incorrectly built, she will have the opportunity to continue working until her time is up. Kaitlyn did not correctly build the puzzle and was officially evicted from the house.
Week 5
681	15	"Episode 15"	Days 37–38	July 29, 2018	5.40	1.5/6
Head of Household ("Perfect Timing"): In the Head of Household competition, the HouseGuests must sit on an email and slide from their outbox to their inbox. The HouseGuest with the closest time to eight seconds will be the new Head of Household. Bayleigh, with a time of 8.08 seconds, was the winner.; On Day 38, Bayleigh nominated Brett and Rachel for eviction.
682	16	"Episode 16"	Days 38–41	August 1, 2018	5.55	1.5/6
Power of Veto ("Goober Driver"): In the Power of Veto competition, HouseGuests had to pave a road so they can give the four evicted HouseGuests a ride across town. The player who paves the road and gets the evicted HouseGuests to the other side of town the fastest wins the Power of Veto. Rachel, JC, and Sam timed out while Tyler won.; Bayleigh shares with Rachel the fact that she has a Power App. After Tyler asks if Bayleigh would put Angela up if someone uses a power, Bayleigh tells Rachel that Tyler is targeting Angela. Then, Rachel tells Angela about Tyler targeting her, which she does not believe. Angela tells Kaycee and she also thinks that it is false. Kaycee tells Tyler about this, Tyler talks with Angela, who all agree Rachel should be the target, not Brett. At the Veto Ceremony, Tyler chose to not use the PoV, thus keeping the nominations the same.
683	17	"Episode 17"	Days 41–44	August 2, 2018	5.61	1.5/6
Ahead of eviction, the show gives an update on Bayleigh's family, which includes Swaggy C meeting Bayleigh's parents. The HouseGuests then participated in the live vote eviction by voting on who they wished to evict from the house. On Day 44, by a vote of 5-4, Rachel was the fifth HouseGuest to be evicted from the Big Brother house.: Head of Household ("GIF That Keeps on Giving"): Throughout the past week HouseGuests were shown GIF's of themselves at predetermined times. In the competition, Julie asked HouseGuests true or false questions about the GIF's they viewed. Following the question, the HouseGuests must lock in their answers. If they answer incorrectly they are eliminated from the competition. The last HouseGuest standing becomes the new Head of Household. If there are two HouseGuests remaining, there will be a tie-breaker. Angela and Rockstar were the last two HouseGuests standing and participated in the tie-breaker. Julie asked a question to which the answer was a number. The HouseGuest with the closest answer without going over would be the next HoH. If both HouseGuests went over, the one closest to the answer would become the HoH. Angela provided the closest answer without going over and became the sixth HoH of the season.; Julie Chen announced after the Head of Household Competition about the "H@cker Comp". Each week, the HouseGuests will compete to "hack" the week. She also announced that the first competition will be on Sunday night's nomination episode.
Week 6
684	18	"Episode 18"	Days 44–45	August 5, 2018	5.57	1.6/7
On Day 45, Angela nominated Rockstar and Scottie for eviction and planned to backdoor Bayleigh.: H@cker Competition ("Crack The Code"): Over seven rounds, HouseGuests had to unscramble notorious Big Brother words in a certain amount of time. If a HouseGuest unscrambles a word correctly, they get one point. Haleigh became the first H@cker with four points.; Haleigh took Scottie off the block and nominated Tyler in his place.
685	19	"Episode 19"	Days 45–48	August 8, 2018	5.63	1.6/8
The H@cker, Haleigh, picked Kaycee to play in the Power of Veto competition.: Power of Veto ("Boom Power Trip"): In an elimination style, HouseGuests had to roll a ball back and forth for a set number of times. The HouseGuest who was not able to finish before everyone else was eliminated and received a prize or a punishment. After someone was eliminated, they could keep their prize or exchange it for anyone else's prize. This went on until only one person remained. The HouseGuest who ended up with the Power of Veto was the winner. Angela ended up with the Power of Veto.; At the Veto Ceremony, Angela chose to use the PoV on Tyler and chose Bayleigh to become the replacement nominee.
686	20	"Episode 20"	Days 48–51	August 9, 2018	4.99	1.4/7
Haleigh calls a house meeting and tells everyone that she was the H@cker. This sparks a fight between Bayleigh and Tyler. As part of the H@cker's abilities, Haleigh chose to nullify Tyler's vote during the live eviction. The HouseGuests then participated in the live vote eviction by voting on who they wished to evict from the house. On Day 51, by a vote of 6-1, Bayleigh was the sixth HouseGuest to be evicted from the Big Brother House and became the first member of the Jury.: Head of Household ("#HashtagTooLong"): In a knockout elimination style, two players were challenged against each other to a multiple choice question. If the HouseGuest who rang in got it wrong, they were eliminated. If the HouseGuest was correct, the competitor was eliminated. The last remaining HouseGuest won the Head of Household. It came down to Haleigh and JC. Haleigh beat JC to become the next Head of Household.
Week 7
687	21	"Episode 21"	Days 51–52	August 12, 2018	5.74	1.6/8
Following the HoH competition, Haleigh and Rockstar discussed who should be nominated. They decided on putting Angela and Kaycee on the block in order to eventually backdoor Tyler. The Level 6 alliance tried to persuade Haleigh to nominate Samantha instead of one of them. Then, Sam went to Haleigh after hearing that her closest allies were conspiring against her, so Haleigh spilled how Level 6 wanted Samantha nominated. On Day 59, Haleigh nominated Angela and Kaycee for eviction.: H@cker Competition ("Hack the House"): The HouseGuests are shown fragments of an image from cameras around the house. Then they have to identify which room the camera is from by examining the image that it is producing. If they correctly identify the room, they get one point. The HouseGuest who gets the most points after seven rounds becomes the final H@cker. Kaycee became the final H@cker with four points.; Kaycee took herself off the block and nominated Rockstar in her place.
688	22	"Episode 22"	Days 52–55	August 15, 2018	5.82	1.7/8
Rockstar, Haleigh, and Faysal talk about who the H@cker is. They start to believe that it is Kaycee. The H@cker, Kaycee, picked Tyler to play in the Power of Veto competition.: Power of Veto ("OTEV the Sneezy Skunk"): In an elimination style, HouseGuests would receive a clue from a sick skunk to find two evicted HouseGuests' names on medicine bottles. The last HouseGuest to get find the medicine bottle is eliminated. The last HouseGuest remaining would win the Power of Veto. During the Power of Veto, Tyler grabbed the wrong medicine bottle, but Rockstar accidentally told him the correct one, so Tyler was able to go back and grab the correct one before Haleigh found it. Tyler won the Power of Veto after Rockstar got the wrong answer.; At the Veto Ceremony, Tyler chose to use the PoV on Angela. Haleigh chose Kaycee to become the replacement nominee.
689	23	"Episode 23"	Days 55–58	August 16, 2018	5.71	1.7/8
Following the Power of Veto ceremony, Rockstar calls Angela "entitled" and says that Kaycee "wasn't supposed to go home" after believing that she has the votes to stay. Rockstar talks with Brett to ensure his vote to evict Kaycee and keep Rockstar. After talking, Rockstar believes that Brett is loyal to only Rockstar and no one else, making an alliance called Mr. and Mrs. Smith. In order to make sure Rockstar fully believes it, Brett helps Rockstar with her speech. After Rockstar talks with Faysal and Haleigh about having the numbers, Faysal calls Rockstar, Haleigh, and himself "unevictable". As part of the H@cker's abilities, Kaycee chose to nullify Faysal's vote during the live eviction. On Day 58, by a vote of 5-1, Rockstar was the seventh HouseGuest to be evicted from the Big Brother House and became the second member of the Jury.: Head of Household ("Glow & Flow"): (Note: This Head of Household competition began in episode 23 on Day 58. However, completion was not broadcast on television until episode 24.) HouseGuests will slide along a path where they have to fill up a bucket in order to retrieve a ball. There is also a second bucket where if you retrieve that ball, you win $5,000. The first HouseGuest to fill up the first bucket will become the next Head of Household.
Week 8
690	24	"Episode 24"	Days 58–59	August 19, 2018	5.80	1.6/7
Head of Household ("Glow & Flow"): Everyone except Faysal, Scottie, and Tyler have fallen out of the competition within the first 15 minutes. Faysal became the eighth HoH of the season.; JC makes the plan to pin Scottie as voting out Rockstar and not Kaycee, planning to say that Brett was the one vote. After Faysal invites everyone to his HoH room, he asks them who the one vote to evict Kaycee was. Scottie claimed it, then Brett did right after. Kaycee backed Brett up by saying that she "felt the energy" around him. Scottie laughed at Kaycee, saying that she was a bad actor and said that their whole production was "cute". The next day, JC continued to try to convince Faysal that Scottie should be his real target by bringing up that Scottie wants Faysal out so that he can be with Haleigh. On Day 59, Faysal nominated Brett and Scottie for eviction.
691	25	"Episode 25"	Days 59–61	August 22, 2018	5.70	1.6/8
On Day 60, Zingbot went into the house to start the special Zingbot Competition.: Power of Veto ("Zing Force"): In this competition, HouseGuests had three minutes to individually hide their locked veto card in the House. Then, one at a time, HouseGuests entered the House and had one minute to attempt to find a veto card. If a HouseGuest's veto card is found, they will be eliminated, though the owner of the veto cards will not be revealed until the end of the competition. The HouseGuest who hides their veto card the best will win the Power of Veto. Angela was knocked out first. Tyler was knocked out second. Haleigh was knocked out third. Faysal was knocked out fourth. It all came down to Brett and Scottie. Scottie was knocked out fifth. Brett won the Power of Veto.
692	26	"Episode 26"	Days 61–65	August 23, 2018	5.61	1.6/8
At the Veto Ceremony, Brett chose to use the PoV on himself. Faysal chose Kaycee to become the replacement nominee. HouseGuests start to speculate if this will be the first unanimous vote. They also say that they will keep Scottie, thinking that he has their votes. On Day 65, by a unanimous vote, Scottie was the eighth HouseGuest to be evicted from the Big Brother House and became the third member of the Jury.: Head of Household ("Sweet Shot"): (Note: This Head of Household competition began in episode 26 on Day 65. However, completion was not broadcast on television until episode 27.) HouseGuests have to search the candy pits for tickets inside the candies. HouseGuests exchange the candies with balls or give it to another HouseGuests. Then, they have to roll the balls in order to get a perfect shot at the end. If they do not, the ball lands in a number 1-40. The HouseGuest to the perfect shot first or get the highest number at the end of one hour wins Head of Household.; Julie Chen announces that the three Jury members, plus a fourth member that will be evicted this week, will compete in Week 10 in a Jury Battle Back.
Week 9
693	27	"Episode 27"	Days 65–66	August 26, 2018	5.67	1.6/7
Head of Household ("Sweet Shot"): After one hour was over and no one had sunk the perfect shot, Angela won with a score of 39.; Haleigh walks in on Angela, Tyler, Kaycee, and Brett celebrating Angela's HoH. Faysal continues to believe that the alliance is genuine, but Haleigh believes that she is targeting them. Faysal continues to talk to her, saying that Angela "is smarter than that" and that she will put Sam and a pawn up. Angela talks with Tyler to talk about whom to nominate. She contemplates putting up Haleigh and Samantha. Then, JC walks in and tells Angela that if either of them come down, she has to nominate one of her allies. Angela decides to stick with the plan of Faysal and Haleigh. On Day 66, Angela nominated Faysal and Haleigh for eviction.
694	28	"Episode 28"	Days 66–69	August 29, 2018	5.77	1.6/8
Faysal talks to the camera about how they had the power in the house for three weeks and all three weeks an alliance member went home. Haleigh says that they are the worst Big Brother players ever.: Power of Veto ("Mission to Planet Veto"): When alien creatures fire at a HouseGuest, vetonium is also thrown at them. When the vetonium hits the ground, it is out of play. The round one vetonium is worth one point. The round two vetonium is worth two points. The round three vetonium is worth three points, although the HouseGuests have to catch it in their mouth. The HouseGuest to catch the most vetonium wins the Power of Veto. Kaycee won the Power of Veto with 33 points, with Faysal one point behind at 32 points.; At the Veto Ceremony, Kaycee chose not to use the PoV, thus keeping the nominations the same.
695	29	"Episode 29"	Days 69–72	August 30, 2018	4.54	1.3/5
Faysal and Haleigh both begin canvassing for votes to keep them safe for the week. The HouseGuests then participated in the live vote and eviction by voting who they wish to evict from the game. On Day 72, by a vote of 4-1, Faysal was the ninth HouseGuest to be evicted from the Big Brother House and became the fourth member of the Jury. Following his eviction interview, Julie informed Faysal of his chance to return to the game via the Jury Battle Back. She then informed the remaining HouseGuests of the same thing.: Jury Battleback ("Big Top Drop"): When the competition begins the evicted HouseGuests must run and collect a ball that corresponds to their color. They must then return to their podium and drop the ball in their tube. The first evicted HouseGuest to fill their tube all the way must run to the other side and hit their buzzer. The first evictee to do such will return to the game. Scottie was the winner.; On Day 72, Scottie returned to the Big Brother house for another chance to win the game.
Week 10
696	30	"Episode 30"	Days 72–73	September 2, 2018	4.66	1.3/7
Head of Household ("High in the Sky"): HouseGuests have to stand with both feet on disks spinning through the backyard. The last HouseGuest to remain on their disk would win the Head of Household. Throughout the competition, they would be hit by pies, squirted with mustard and ketchup, and showered in feathers. Tyler stayed on for the longest time and won Head of Household.; On Day 73, Tyler nominated Scottie and Haleigh for eviction.
697	31	"Episode 31"	Days 73–76	September 5, 2018	5.52	1.6/8
Power of Veto ("Control Your Emojis"): HouseGuests have to grab an "emoji", walk across a seesaw, and place the emoji in the message bubble. If one or more emojis fell out of their message bubble, the HouseGuest had to restart. The first HouseGuest to have all of their emojis in the message bubble and hit the button would win the Power of Veto. Kaycee was the winner.; At the Veto Ceremony, Kaycee chose not to use the PoV, thus keeping the nominations the same.
698	32	"Episode 32"	Days 76–79	September 6, 2018	5.21	1.5/6
On Day 79, by a unanimous vote of 5-0, Scottie was re-evicted from the Big Brother House. He became the 10th HouseGuest to be evicted and re-joined the Jury as the fourth member.: Head of Household ("Shell or Highwater"): The HouseGuests have three minutes to maneuver pearls down the seaweed plant one at the time. The first HouseGuest to get all three pearls into the oysters and buzz in, or whoever sank the most pearls after three minutes, will become the new HOH. Kaycee was the winner.; Julie then told the home viewers that Week 11 would have a Double Eviction episode.
Week 11
699	33	"Episode 33"	Days 79–80	September 9, 2018	5.48	1.6/6
Big Brother 16 HouseGuest and the winner of Big Brother 18 Nicole Franzel visited the house to host a Luxury Competition. In reality, it was part of fellow Big Brother 18 HouseGuest and boyfriend Victor Arroyo's plan to surprise her with a proposal, which she accepted. Then, former Big Brother HouseGuests Derrick Levasseur, Britney Haynes, Daniele Donato, Josh Martinez and Paul Abrahamian arrived at the house to celebrate Victor and Nicole's engagement. On Day 80, Kaycee nominated Haleigh and Sam for eviction.
700	34	"Episode 34"	Days 80–83	September 12, 2018	5.70	1.5/7
Power of Veto ("BB Comics"): One at the time, the HouseGuests must climb a ladder and zip line slowly to view a window with comic books situated behind them. Down below, the players must precisely replicate the comics in order. There are, however, fake comic books in the pile of comics to choose from, so players have to be careful. Kaycee was the winner.; At the Veto Ceremony, Kaycee chose not to use the POV, thus keeping the nominations the same.
701	35	"Episode 35"	Days 83–86	September 13, 2018	5.57	1.6/7
The HouseGuests begin planning on who they wish to evict. Julie then informs the HouseGuests of the Double Eviction. The HouseGuests then participate in the first live vote and eviction for the evening by voting on who they wish to evict from the Big Brother house. On Day 86, by a unanimous vote of 4-0, Haleigh became the 11th HouseGuest to be evicted from the game and also became the fifth member of the Jury.: Head of Household ("Buffering"): Throughout the day HouseGuests were shown videos of past competitions. In this competition, HouseGuests were shown the videos again; however, at a certain part the video stops, or "buffers", and the HouseGuests must answer a multiple choice question about the video before the remainder is shown. If the HouseGuests guess correctly, they receive a point. The HouseGuest with the most point with the most points after seven rounds became the next Head of Household. Tyler was the winner with six points and became the next HoH.; With only a few moments to strategize, Tyler immediately chose to nominate JC and Sam for eviction.: Power of Veto ("Block and Roll"): When the competition begins, the HouseGuests must strategically place blocks in order to roll their ball down their tube and into a hole on the other end of their playing board. The first HouseGuest to do so won the Power of Veto. Angela was the winner.; Angela chose to use the PoV by removing JC from the block. Tyler then nominated Brett as the replacement nominee. On Day 86, by a unanimous vote of 3-0, Brett was also evicted from the Big Brother House. He became the 12th HouseGuest to be evicted and joined the Jury as the sixth member.
Week 12
702	36	"Episode 36"	Days 86–87	September 16, 2018	6.36	1.7/6
Bebe Rexha surprises the HouseGuests with a private concert in the backyard.: Head of Household ("BBFlix & Chill"): Angela was the winner.; Angela nominated JC and Sam for eviction.
703	37	"Episode 37"	Days 87–91	September 19, 2018	5.56	1.5/7
Julie informed the HouseGuests that eviction night had come early.: Power of Veto ("Your Mazes are Numbered"): One at a time, each houseguest entered the BB Labyrinth in order to lift the curse. They must search for one wizard, two wolves, and three witches, in that order. When they find one station, they have 30 seconds to find the next one. If they do not find the next station in 30 seconds, they must restart at the first station. The houseguest with the fastest time will win the Power of Veto. With a time of five minutes and forty-six seconds. Kaycee was the winner.; At the Veto Ceremony, Kaycee decided not to use the PoV, thus keeping the nominations the same. On Day 91, by a unanimous vote of 2-0, Sam was evicted from the Big Brother House. She became the 13th HouseGuest to be evicted and joined the Jury as the seventh member.: Head of Household ("What the Bleep"): In this competition, Julie showed the competing HouseGuests clips of the show from throughout the summer that included conversations or speeches from evicted HouseGuests. However, one word or phrase was "bleeped" out and the HouseGuests must choose the correct word or phrase from two answers. The HouseGuests were then shown the rest of the clip. Answering correctly earns the competitors a point. The HouseGuest with the most points at the end became the winner. JC had the most points and became the next Head of Household.
704	38	"Episode 38"	Days 91–93	September 20, 2018	5.68	1.5/7
JC nominated Angela and Tyler for eviction. Scottie and Haleigh are then shown entering the Jury House as the Jurors watch the competitions in the week of Scottie's and Haleigh's eviction. Brett and Sam are also shown entering the Jury House and their competitions in the week of their evictions are also shown.: Power of Veto ("Down to the Wires"):" In the final PoV competition of the season, the HouseGuests were asked questions about the summer. They then must use their wire to raise a random number of balls up and drop it in the thumbs up icon of the competition that is the answer until all answers are met. When they believe they have the correct answer, they must hit their buzzer. If a HouseGuest answers incorrectly or fails to answer before the other competing HouseGuests answer, they receive a strike. After two strikes, a HouseGuest is eliminated. The last HouseGuest standing received the PoV. Kaycee was the winner.; At the Veto Ceremony, Kaycee chose not to use the Power of Veto, thus keeping the nominations the same. On Day 92, Kaycee cast the sole vote to evict Angela. Angela became the 14th HouseGuest to be evicted from the Big Brother House and joined the Jury as the eighth member.
Week 13
705	39	"Episode 39"	Days 93–94; Various (Note: A recap of Angela's eviction that took place on September 20, 2018 (Day 93 inside the House) is shown with JC, Kaycee, and Tyler's reactions. The episode then transitions to the next day, where the HouseGuests looked back over their time in the game with flashbacks from previous events that took place. The episode ends with the start of the first part of the final Head of Household competition that took place in real time on September 20, 2018.)	September 23, 2018	5.44	1.4/6
JC, Kaycee, and Tyler celebrated making it to the final three. Former Big Brother competitor Jeff Schroeder entered the house and the four looked back on the summer, highlighting their favorite moments.: Head of Household: (Note: The first part of the final Head of Household competition began in episode 39. However, completion was not broadcast on television until episode 40.) The final Head of Household competition of the season consisted of three parts. The winner of the first part immediately advances to the third part, while the other two HouseGuests move on to compete in part two. In the final part, the winner of part one faces the winner of part two. The winner of the final part becomes the final HoH of the season.; Part 1: ("Jetpack Attack") In this competition, the HouseGuests must grab and hold onto their "jetpack" as it "flies". The last remaining HouseGuest to hold onto their jetpack became the winner of the first part of the final HoH competition.
706	40	"Episode 40"	Days 93–99	September 26, 2018	5.65	1.7/7
Head of Household: The final Head of Household competition of the season consisted of three parts. The winner of the first part immediately advances to the third part, while the other two HouseGuests move on to compete in part two. In the final part, the winner of part one faces the winner of part two. The winner of the final part becomes the final HoH of the season.; Part 1: ("Jetpack Attack") JC fell first, followed by Kaycee. Tyler was the winner.; Part 2: ("Mount Evictus") The competing HouseGuests, throughout four different rounds, are given clues to a group of evicted HouseGuests. They must put the names of the four evicted HouseGuests that fit the category onto their board and then hit their buzzer. If they are correct, a laser "carves" their faces into "Mount Evictus", if they are incorrect, they must attempt to correct it. The HouseGuest to do this with the fastest time became the winner. Kaycee was the winner with a time of 18 minutes and 55 seconds.; Former Big Brother HouseGuest Dr. Will Kirby then hosted the Jury Round Table, interviewing the Jury on who they think should win and why.: Part 3: ("Jury Oddcasts") Kaycee and Tyler are shown "oddcasts" of Jury members mentioning facts of their time in the house. They must decide if the oddcast is right or wrong. If they answer correctly, they gain a point. The HouseGuest with the most points after eight rounds became the final HoH of the season. Kaycee and Tyler tied with six points, each sending the competition to a tiebreaker. Julie asked the competitors a question to which the answer was a number. The HouseGuest closest to the number without going over, or the closest to the number if both went over, would become the winner. Kaycee was the winner and was crowned the final HoH of the season.; On Day 99, as HoH Kaycee cast the sole vote to evict JC from the Big Brother house. JC became the 15th and final HouseGuest to be evicted from the Big Brother House and joined the Jury as the ninth and final member. The Jury members then had a chance to ask Kaycee and Tyler questions. The Jury members then voted on who they think should win Big Brother. Julie then asked some of the former HouseGuests a few final questions, which involved Swaggy C proposing to Bayleigh. Later on Day 99, Kaycee Clark was declared the winner of Big Brother 20, by a final Jury vote of 5-4, against Tyler Crispen. Tyler was also subsequently crowned America's Favorite HouseGuest.

== Voting history ==
Color key:

Winner
Runner-up
Head of Household
Nominated for eviction
Immune from eviction
Not eligible to vote
Evicted
Re-entered the game

Voting history (season 20)
	Week 1	Week 2	Week 3	Week 4	Week 5	Week 6	Week 7	Week 8	Week 9	Week 10	Week 11		Week 12		Week 13	
	Week 1	Week 2	Week 3	Week 4	Week 5	Week 6	Week 7	Week 8	Week 9	Week 10	Day 80	Day 86 (Note: This week was a double eviction week. Following the first eviction, the remaining HouseGuests played a week's worth of games, including Head of Household and veto competitions, and nomination, veto and eviction ceremonies, during the live show, culminating in a second eviction for the week.)	Day 87	Day 91	Day 99	Finale
Head of Household	Tyler	Kaitlyn	Scottie	Sam	Bayleigh	Angela	Haleigh	Fessy	Angela	Tyler	Kaycee	Tyler	Angela	JC	Kaycee	(None)
Technology winner	Sam	Tyler	Bayleigh	(None)		Haleigh	Kaycee	(None)							(None)	(None)
Nominations (initial)	Sam; Steve	Scottie; Winston	Brett; Winston	Haleigh; Kaitlyn	Brett; Rachel	Rockstar; ~~Scottie~~ (Note: This player's nomination for eviction was cancelled by the winner of the H@cker Competition.); Tyler (Note: This player was nominated for eviction by the winner of the H@cker Competition.)	Angela; ~~Kaycee~~; Rockstar	Brett; Scottie	Fessy; Haleigh	Haleigh; Scottie	Haleigh; Sam	JC; Sam	JC; Sam	Angela; Tyler	(None)	(None)
Veto winner	Fessy	Tyler	Scottie	Fessy	Tyler	Angela	Tyler	Brett	Kaycee	Kaycee	Kaycee	Angela	Kaycee	Kaycee	(None)	(None)
Nominations (final)	Sam; Steve	Swaggy C Winston	Brett; Winston	Kaitlyn; Rockstar	Brett; Rachel	Bayleigh; Rockstar	Kaycee; Rockstar	Kaycee; Scottie	Fessy; Haleigh	Haleigh; Scottie	Haleigh; Sam	Brett; Sam	JC; Sam	Angela; Tyler	JC; Tyler	(None)
Kaycee	Steve (Note: As the winner of the opening competition, Swaggy C was able to grant immunity to two move-in groups; he chose group 3 (Haleigh, Scottie, Fessy, and Kaycee) and group 4 (Rachel, Swaggy C, Brett, and Rockstar).)	Swaggy C	Winston	Kaitlyn	Rachel	Bayleigh	Nominated	Nominated	Fessy	Scottie	Head of Household	Brett	Sam	Angela	JC (Note: As Head of Household, Kaycee chose to evict JC.)	Winner
Tyler	Head of Household	Swaggy C	Winston	Kaitlyn	Rachel	Not eligible (Note: This player was blocked from voting at the eviction ceremony by the winner of the H@cker Competition.)	Rockstar	Scottie	Fessy	Head of Household	Haleigh	Head of Household	Sam	Nominated	Nominated	Runner-up
JC	Steve	Swaggy C	Winston	Rockstar	Rachel	Bayleigh	Rockstar	Scottie	Fessy	Scottie	Haleigh	Brett	Nominated	Head of Household	Evicted (Day 99)	Tyler
Angela	Steve	Swaggy C	Winston	Kaitlyn	Rachel	Head of Household	Rockstar	Scottie	Head of Household	Scottie	Haleigh	Brett	Head of Household	Nominated	Evicted (Day 93)	Tyler
Sam	Nominated	Swaggy C	Winston	Head of Household	Rachel	Rockstar	Rockstar	Scottie	Haleigh	Scottie	Nominated	Nominated	Nominated	Evicted (Day 91)		Kaycee
Brett	Steve	Swaggy C	Nominated	Kaitlyn	Nominated	Bayleigh	Rockstar	Scottie	Fessy	Scottie	Haleigh	Nominated	Evicted (Day 86)			Tyler
Haleigh	Sam	Winston	Brett	Kaitlyn	Brett	Bayleigh	Head of Household	Scottie	Nominated	Nominated	Nominated	Evicted (Day 86)				Tyler
Scottie	Sam	Swaggy C	Head of Household	Kaitlyn	Brett	Bayleigh	Kaycee	Nominated	Evicted (Day 65)	Nominated	Re-evicted (Day 79)					Kaycee
Fessy	Sam	Winston	Brett	Kaitlyn	Brett	Bayleigh	Not eligible	Head of Household	Nominated	Evicted (Day 72)						Kaycee
Rockstar	Sam	Winston	Brett	Nominated	Brett	Nominated	Nominated	Evicted (Day 58)								Kaycee
Bayleigh	Sam	Winston	Brett	Kaitlyn	Head of Household	Nominated	Evicted (Day 51)									Kaycee
Rachel	Steve	Swaggy C	Winston	Kaitlyn	Nominated	Evicted (Day 44)										
Kaitlyn	Steve	Head of Household	Brett	Nominated	Evicted (Day 37)											
Winston	Steve	Nominated	Nominated	Evicted (Day 30)												
Swaggy C	Sam	Nominated	Evicted (Day 23)													
Steve	Nominated	Evicted (Day 16)														
Evicted	Steve; 7 of 13 votes to evict	Swaggy C 8 of 12 votes to evict	Winston; 6 of 11 votes to evict	Kaitlyn (Note: Kaitlyn competed to re-enter the house, but was unsuccessful and was officially evicted.); 9 of 10 votes to evict	Rachel; 5 of 9 votes to evict	Bayleigh; 6 of 7 votes to evict	Rockstar; 5 of 6 votes to evict	Scottie; 6 of 6 votes to evict	Fessy; 4 of 5 votes to evict	Scottie; Won re-entry into game (Note: Bayleigh, Rockstar, Scottie, and Fessy competed for an opportunity to re-enter the game. Scottie won the competition and re-entered the house on day 72.)	Haleigh; 4 of 4 votes to evict	Brett; 3 of 3 votes to evict	Sam; 2 of 2 votes to evict	Angela; Kaycee's choice to evict	JC; Kaycee's choice to evict	Kaycee; 5 votes to win
Evicted	Steve; 7 of 13 votes to evict	Swaggy C 8 of 12 votes to evict	Winston; 6 of 11 votes to evict	Kaitlyn; 9 of 10 votes to evict	Rachel; 5 of 9 votes to evict	Bayleigh; 6 of 7 votes to evict	Rockstar; 5 of 6 votes to evict	Scottie; 6 of 6 votes to evict	Fessy; 4 of 5 votes to evict	Scottie; 5 of 5 votes to evict	Haleigh; 4 of 4 votes to evict	Brett; 3 of 3 votes to evict	Sam; 2 of 2 votes to evict	Angela; Kaycee's choice to evict	JC; Kaycee's choice to evict	Tyler; 4 votes to win

== Production ==
=== Development ===
The series was announced in August 2016 as part of a double renewal for Big Brother 19 and Big Brother 20. Along with the series the 24/7 live feeds returned with a CBS All Access subscription and Big Brother: After Dark also returned on Pop. The season is produced by Endemol Shine North America and Fly on the Wall Entertainment. Julie Chen returned as host and Allison Grodner as well as Rich Meehan returned as Executive Producers. CBS began allowing online applications in September 2017, however open casting calls did not begin until March 2018. Celebrity Big Brother winner and runner up Marissa Jaret Winokur and Ross Mathews host a new companion show known as Off the Block with Ross and Marissa following the end of former House Guest Jeff Schroeder's Big Brother Live Chat.

=== Prize ===
The HouseGuest compete for a grand prize of $500,000, among other rewards and luxuries given out during the season, including a $25,000 award for the America's Favorite HouseGuest fan-favorite poll in the finale.

== Reception ==
=== Critical response ===
Joseph Charles "JC" Mounduix received criticism after he was shown using an ice cream scoop on the genitals of his other HouseGuests. Mounduix later told fellow HouseGuest Kaycee Clark to open up her vagina, saying that it "feels good". Mounduix was also criticized by both fans and his fellow housemates for making light of the #MeToo movement after making jokes at the movement's expense.

Mounduix was criticized by fans after he asked Rachel Swindler if she was transgender, stating that she has "a big Adam's apple." Mounduix proceeded to feel Swindler's neck, but she told him to stop. Moments later, he began to touch Swindler's neck again before being stopped by her.

Mounduix and fellow HouseGuest Kaitlyn Herman both came under fire after they used the n-word in separate occasions. Herman used the word as she was singing the lyrics of a Drake song. Mounduix used the word after HouseGuest Bayleigh Dayton, who is African American, asked Mounduix if there is a "difference between a midget and a dwarf". Offended, Mounduix said that the word "midget" is a derogatory term and then compared it to the n-word. Many came to the defense of the two, saying that they did not use the word towards someone. Herman later apologized for using the word on an Instagram live stream. Herman had also been criticized from viewers for her feelings and actions towards several men in the Big Brother House, while being in a five-year relationship outside of the house. In Week 3, Herman's then-boyfriend released a statement on Twitter, stating that he wanted to distance himself from the show and situation.

Viewers questioned Angela Rummans and Swindler after they were caught on the live feeds making some questionable remarks. Rummans referred to her uneven tan lines as looking "ghetto", while Swindler compared her uneven tan lines to the skintone of Dayton. CBS later released a statement and warned Rummans and Swindler with future consequences.

Viewers perceived some of Dayton's comments about Faysal Shafaat as being anti-Muslim. After Shafaat, a Muslim, complained about his in-house crush Haleigh Broucher talking about her past sexual experiences, Dayton claimed in private that Shafaat should "go find a virgin" and that he should "go to Pakistan and [get himself] one" because "that's what they do." Many viewers interpreted "they" as meaning Muslims.

Mounduix was once again involved in two separate sexual misconduct incidents in which he was accused of sexual harassment and sexual assault. While sleeping in the same bed, Mounduix was seen caressing Tyler Crispen's arm, face, and chest, as well as kissing his armpit while Crispen was sleeping. The following morning Crispen stated to Kaycee Clark "I'm sleeping alone tonight — JC is not sleeping with me". Mounduix explained his version by stating that he was "comforting Crispen who was having nightmares". Later, Mounduix opened the toilet door while HouseGuest Haleigh Broucher was using it. Broucher repeatedly asked Mounduix to close the door, who refused and tied the door open. Broucher then yelled for assistance from production and later filed a complaint with executive producer Allison Grodner. The producers later released a statement saying that neither Crispen nor Broucher filed official complaints and that the two had expressed to them that they "did not feel threatened or unsafe by Mounduix's actions."

During a live eviction speech, HouseGuest Scottie Salton made sexual and vulgar comments towards HouseGuests Crispen and Rummans. He hinted that Crispen received oral sex from Rummans, which got censored out by CBS.

=== Ratings ===
Unless noted below, all episode aired in the United States on Sundays and Wednesdays at 8:00 Eastern Standard Time (7:00 Central Standard Time) and live Thursdays at 9:00 EST (8:00 CST).

#	Air Date	United States				Source
#	Air Date	18–49 (rating/share)	Viewers (millions)	Rank (timeslot)	Rank (night)	Source
1	Wednesday, June 27, 2018	1.5/7	5.33	1	1	
2	Thursday, June 28, 2018	1.4/6	5.13	1	1	
3	Sunday, July 1, 2018	1.2/6	4.78	1	1	
4	Wednesday, July 4, 2018	0.9/5	3.95	1	2	
5	Thursday, July 5, 2018	1.3/6	4.96	1	1	
6	Sunday, July 8, 2018	1.3/6	5.11	1	1	
7	Wednesday, July 11, 2018	1.5/7	5.43	1	1	
8	Thursday, July 12, 2018	1.5/6	5.32	1	1	
9	Sunday, July 15, 2018	1.4/6	5.19	1	1	
10	Wednesday, July 18, 2018	1.4/6	5.24	1	1	
11	Thursday, July 19, 2018	1.6/7	5.58	1	1	
12	Sunday, July 22, 2018	1.5/6	5.45	1	1	
13	Wednesday, July 25, 2018	1.5/6	5.69	1	1	
14	Thursday, July 26, 2018	1.5/6	5.44	1	1	
15	Sunday, July 29, 2018	1.5/6	5.40	1	1	
16	Wednesday, August 1, 2018	1.5/6	5.55	1	1	
17	Thursday, August 2, 2018	1.5/6	5.61	1	2	
18	Sunday, August 5, 2018	1.6/7	5.57	1	1	
19	Wednesday, August 8, 2018	1.6/8	5.63	1	1	
20	Thursday, August 9, 2018	1.4/7	4.99	1	1	
21^{1}	Sunday, August 12, 2018	1.6/8	5.74	1	1	
22	Wednesday, August 15, 2018	1.7/8	5.82	1	1	
23	Thursday, August 16, 2018	1.7/8	5.71	1	1	
24	Sunday, August 19, 2018	1.6/7	5.80	1	1	
25	Wednesday, August 22, 2018	1.6/8	5.70	1 (tied)	2	
26	Thursday, August 23, 2018	1.6/8	5.61	1	1	
27	Sunday, August 26, 2018	1.6/7	5.67	1 (tied)	2	
28	Wednesday, August 29, 2018	1.6/8	5.77	1	1	
29	Thursday, August 30, 2018	1.3/5	4.54	1	1	
30	Sunday, September 2, 2018	1.3/7	4.66	1	1	
31	Wednesday, September 5, 2018	1.6/8	5.52	1	1	
32	Thursday, September 6, 2018	1.5/6	5.21	2	3	
33	Sunday, September 9, 2018	1.6/6	5.48	3	6	
34	Wednesday, September 12, 2018	1.5/7	5.70	2	2	
35	Thursday, September 13, 2018	1.6/7	5.57	1	1	
36^{2}	Sunday, September 16, 2018	1.7/6	6.36	2	5	
37	Wednesday, September 19, 2018	1.5/7	5.56	2	2	
38	Thursday, September 20, 2018	1.5/7	5.68	1	1	
39	Sunday, September 23, 2018	1.4/6	5.44	3	6	
40	Wednesday, September 26, 2018	1.7/7	5.65	1	3 (tied)	

- ^Note 1: Episode 21 was delayed to 8:20 PM EST (7:20 PM CST) due to the 2018 PGA Championship golf event running long.
- ^Note 2: Episode 36 was delayed to 8:37 PM EST (7:37 PM CST) due to the New England Patriots-Jacksonville Jaguars game running long.

=== Future of the series ===
The American adaptation of Big Brother has aired on CBS since its inception on July 5, 2000 with Julie Chen as host. Following two articles published by The New Yorker by Ronan Farrow in July and September 2018, where several women accused Chen's husband Les Moonves of harassment, intimidation, and sexual misconduct, effective September 9, 2018, Moonves departed CBS Corporation as President, Chairman and CEO, with Joseph Ianniello appointed as President and Acting CEO. In response to the claims against him, Moonves released a statement denying the allegations. After the first article was published, Chen released a statement on Twitter in July defending her husband.

While Chen was initially confirmed to return to the ninth season of her other CBS show The Talk, she was absent from the season premiere that aired on September 10, 2018. Chen issued a statement where she was taking a few days off, but would continue with Big Brother. Chen's first television appearance since Moonves' departure was the live eviction on September 13, 2018, where she closed out the episode with "From outside the Big Brother house...I'm Julie Chen Moonves, good night." The new sign-off broke with an established pattern that Chen has used in the past on Big Brother and showcased her support for her husband, while it received a mixed response from fans and viewers on Twitter. Chen subsequently announced her departure from The Talk in a pre-recorded segment that aired on the September 18, 2018 episode, where she stood outside the Big Brother house. Chen will continue to host Big Brother.

The 20th season had been confirmed since August 10, 2016 as part of a two-year renewal between CBS and Fly on the Wall Entertainment, in association with Endemol Shine North America.Celebrity Big Brother was renewed for a second season on May 12, 2018 during CBS' annual upfront for the 2018–19 television season. Speculation on the status of the show intensified after the departure of Moonves from CBS, with fans of the show and former HouseGuests began spreading the hashtag #SaveBBUSA in an attempt to get the program renewed. Unnamed insiders close to the production of the show have cast doubt if Chen would return to host potential future installments if CBS renews the show. In an article from US Weekly, an insider noted that Big Brother 2 winner Will Kirby, Celebrity Big Brother 1 runner-up Ross Mathews, and Big Brother Canada host Arisa Cox have been mentioned as potential replacements in the event that Chen does not to return, while TMZ reported that Chen will continue with the show if the network decides to renew it.

CBS began accepting online applications for a 21st season on September 20, 2018. After a few months of uncertainty, CBS officially announced that season 21 would go on during the summer.
