= BB12 =

BB12 may refer to:

- BB12, a postcode district in the BB postcode area
- BB-12 (black bear), an American black bear that lived in the Santa Monica Mountains
- Big Brother 12 (disambiguation), a television programme in various versions
  - Bigg Boss 12 (disambiguation), Indian versions of the TV franchise
- USS Ohio (BB-12), a Maine-class pre-dreadnought battleship
