= Big Brother 11 (American season) =

Coordinates: 34°8′40.12″N 118°23′20.71″W

Big Brother
- Season 11
- One of Big Brother 11 title cards
- Hosted by: Julie Chen
- No. of days: 73
- No. of houseguests: 13
- Winner: Jordan Lloyd
- Runner-up: Natalie Martinez
- America's Favorite Houseguest: Jeff Schroeder
- Companion shows: Inside Dish with Ross Mathews; Big Brother: After Dark
- No. of episodes: 30

Release
- Original network: CBS
- Original release: July 9 – September 15, 2009

Additional information
- Filming dates: July 5 – September 15, 2009

Season chronology
- ← Previous; Season 10 Next → Season 12

Big Brother 11 is the eleventh season of the American reality television series Big Brother. It is based upon the Netherlands series of the same name, which gained notoriety in 1999 and 2000. The season premiered on CBS on July 9, 2009, and lasted ten weeks until the live finale on September 15, 2009. The eleventh season saw a slight increase in ratings when compared to the past season of the series, which had some of the lowest ratings to date. The season premiered to a total of 6.59 million viewers, a slight increase from the previous season's launch. Despite this, it is the second lowest premiere for a season behind Big Brother 10. The season finale had a total of 7.78 million viewers, continuing to average slightly above the past season. In total, the series averaged 7.19 million viewers, higher than that of the previous two seasons. Big Brother 11 featured a total of 13 HouseGuests, one of which was a returning player from a previous season. The series ended after 73 days, in which HouseGuest Jordan Lloyd was crowned the winner and Natalie Martinez the runner-up.

== Format ==
The format remained largely unchanged from previous seasons. HouseGuests were incarcerated in the Big Brother House with no contact to and from the outside world. Each week, the HouseGuests took part in several compulsory challenges that determined who would win food, luxuries and power in the House. The winner of the Head of Household competition was immune from nominations and was instructed to nominate two fellow HouseGuests for eviction. After a HouseGuest became Head of Household he or she was ineligible to take part in the next Head of Household competition. The winner of the Power of Veto competition won the right to save one of the nominated HouseGuests from eviction. If the Veto winner exercised the power, the Head of Household then had to nominate another HouseGuest for eviction.

On eviction night all HouseGuests except for the Head of Household and the two nominees voted to evict one of the two nominees. Before the voting began the nominees had the chance to say a final message to their fellow HouseGuests. This compulsory vote was conducted in the privacy of the Diary Room by the host Julie Chen. In the event of a tie, the Head of Household would break the tie and reveal their vote in front of the other HouseGuests. Unlike other versions of Big Brother, the HouseGuests could discuss the nomination and eviction process open and freely. The nominee with the most votes from the other HouseGuests was evicted from the House on Thursday and interviewed by Julie Chen. HouseGuests could voluntarily leave the House at any time and those who broke the rules were expelled by Big Brother. The last seven evictees of the season form the Jury that voted for the winner on the season finale, they were known as the jury members. The jury members were sequestered in a separate house and were not allowed to watch the show except for segments that included all of the HouseGuests. The jury members were not shown any Diary Room interviews or any footage that included strategy or details regarding nominations.

In a change from previous seasons, the food competitions were changed to Have vs. Have-Not competitions. HouseGuests were divided into either the "Haves" or the "Have Nots" depending on their performance in the competitions. HouseGuests that became "Have Nots" for the week were only allowed to eat slop and a weekly food restriction, chosen by the viewing public, cold showers and sleeping on metal beds. A new rule was revealed this season, in the event a HouseGuest that would be part of the jury to determine the winner voluntarily leaves the House or is expelled by Big Brother the American public replaced that HouseGuest on the jury and voted for the winner along with the remaining jury members.

== HouseGuests ==
The cast of the eleventh season of Big Brother. Top: Jeff, Jordan, Braden, Chima, Ronnie, Lydia, Kevin and Laura Bottom: Russell, Michele, Casey, Natalie and Jessie

Twelve of the thirteen HouseGuests were revealed during The Early Show on July 1, 2009, by Julie Chen. During the season premiere the Houseguests were split into four cliques and Jessie Godderz was revealed as the final Houseguest during the season premiere on July 9, 2009, after the Athletes clique won the first Head of Household competition.

Name	Age on entry	Occupation	Residence	Result
Jordan Lloyd	22	Waitress	Charlotte, North Carolina	Winner; Day 73
Natalie Martinez	24	Taekwondo champion	Gilbert, Arizona	Runner-up; Day 73
Kevin Campbell	29	Graphic designer	Chula Vista, California	Evicted; Day 73
Michele Noonan	27	Neuroscientist	Pasadena, California	Evicted; Day 66
Jeff Schroeder	31	Advertising salesman	Norridge, Illinois	Evicted; Day 61
Russell Kairouz	24	Mixed martial arts fighter	Walnut Creek, California	Evicted; Day 54
Lydia Tavera	24	Special effects make-up artist	Torrance, California	Evicted; Day 47
Chima Simone	32	Freelance journalist	West Hollywood, California	Expelled; Day 42
Jessie Godderz Big Brother 10	23	Professional bodybuilder	Huntington Beach, California	Evicted; Day 40
Ronnie Talbott	30	Video game expert	Belpre, Ohio	Evicted; Day 33
Casey Turner	41	Fifth grade teacher	St. Petersburg, Florida	Evicted; Day 26
Laura Crosby	21	Bikini model	Atlanta, Georgia	Evicted; Day 19
Braden Bacha	28	Surfer	Santa Monica, California	Evicted; Day 12

=== Future appearances ===
Jordan Lloyd and Jeff Schroeder competed on The Amazing Race 16, then returned for Big Brother 12 the following year to participate in a Power of Veto competition. They later returned to compete on Big Brother 13 in 2011, then returned on Big Brother 16, in which Jeff proposed to Jordan.

In 2020, Kevin Campbell returned to compete on Big Brother: All-Stars.

In 2024, Jessie Godderz competed on E! Network reality TV series House of Villains.

== Summary ==
On Day 1, twelve HouseGuests entered the house. Following introductions, the HouseGuests learned of the season's twist, in which they would be playing as members of common high-school cliques. Despite this, HouseGuests continued to play the game as individuals and competed in competitions as individuals, were nominated as individuals, and were evicted as individuals. They also learned that if a member of their clique won Head of Household, they could not be nominated for eviction. Upon entering the backyard to compete in their first Head of Household competition, the HouseGuests learned what cliques they were placed in. HouseGuests Jeff, Natalie, and Russell were in the Athletes clique, while Chima, Michele, and Ronnie were in the Brains clique. Casey, Kevin, and Lydia were placed in the Offbeat clique, leaving Braden, Jordan, and Laura in the Popular clique. Following this, HouseGuests competed in "The Wedgie" Head of Household competition. For this competition, HouseGuests wore a pair of over-sized underwear and held onto a toilet seat while being suspended by the underwear. The last HouseGuest remaining in the air would earn a fourth member for their clique, with this person becoming the first Head of Household of the season. The four eligible HouseGuests to enter the game were former HouseGuests Michael "Cowboy" Ellis for the Offbeat clique, Jessica Hughbanks for the Popular clique, Brian Hart for the Brains clique, and Jessie Godderz for the Athletes clique. Natalie and Russell were the last two HouseGuests remaining, thus earning immunity and a fourth clique member; Jessie entered the house as their fourth member and became the first Head of Household of the season. Jessie's entrance brought the number of HouseGuests to thirteen. In an attempt to keep himself safe, Ronnie and Jessie formed an alliance between the Brains clique and the Athletes clique. Hoping to hide their alliance, Jessie and Natalie proposed that Ronnie be nominated as a pawn, but he refused.

On Day 4, HouseGuests competed in the "Big Brother Rave" Have-Not competition. For this competition, HouseGuests were required to construct a series of pipes to spell the word "Have" while neon "Rave Juice" flowed through the piping. If done correctly, the pipes would cause the juice to spill onto a wheel and make it spin; the last team to complete the task would be the Have-Nots for the week. The Brains clique lost, meaning Chima, Michele, and Ronnie were the Have-Nots for the week. This greatly upset Chima, who stated on numerous occasions afterwards that she was debating walking from the game. Jessie took an immediate dislike to Laura and hoped to put her up, though his clique members attempted to convince him that Lydia should be evicted that week. Due to Ronnie refusing to be nominated as a pawn, Chima agreed to be the pawn. On Day 5, Jessie nominated Chima and Lydia for eviction, with Lydia his target for eviction. Worried they might not have the votes to keep Chima, Jessie and Russell formed an alliance with Laura in an attempt to get her to evict Lydia. When picking players for the Power of Veto competition, Russell, Natalie, and Jeff were selected to compete for the Power of Veto; Casey was selected to host. On Day 7, HouseGuests competed in the "Pop Goes the Veto!" Power of Veto competition. For this competition, HouseGuests had to pop "pimples" on an over-sized face, with various Scrabble tiles inside them. The HouseGuests would collect tiles and attempt to spell a word with their collected tiles; the HouseGuest with the longest correctly spelled word won the Power of Veto. Russell was the winner of the Power of Veto with “shotgun.” Following the competition, Jeff engaged in numerous arguments with Russell and Natalie, causing a rift in their clique. In an attempt to save herself, Lydia tried to convince Russell and Jessie to backdoor Braden by taking her off the block as a way to hurt Jeff. Russell told Ronnie that this was the plan, with Ronnie telling Braden, Jeff, and Jordan about the plan. On Day 9, Russell used the Power of Veto to remove Lydia from the block, with Braden nominated in her place. Following Braden's nomination, Jordan and Laura began campaigning to get the votes for him to stay and appeared to have themselves, Casey, Jeff, Michele, and Ronnie in agreement; Ronnie, however, was playing both sides and had no intention of keeping Braden in the game. On Day 12, Braden became the first HouseGuest to be evicted from the house when Jessie cast the tie-breaker vote in Chima's favor.

Following Braden's eviction, HouseGuests competed in the "Most Likely To..." Head of Household competition. For this competition, they attempted to correctly guess which clique the viewers felt best fit a certain scenario; when a HouseGuest answered correctly, they could eliminate one contestant, while an incorrect answer led to their own elimination. Ronnie was the winner. Following the eviction, those who evicted Chima speculated that Ronnie had been the HouseGuest to change his vote, though he denied this and blamed Michele. Laura, one of the first to realize that Ronnie had changed his vote, attempted to turn the other HouseGuests against him, though Chima and Natalie informed Ronnie of this. On Day 13, HouseGuests competed in the "Who Knows The Ugly Truth?" luxury competition. Season 10 winner Dan Gheesling returned to host the competition, in which the HouseGuests answered questions based on what a member of the opposite sex felt. The male and female winners of the competition got to see the film The Ugly Truth, as well as choose the Have-Nots for the week. Casey and Chima won and chose the Popular clique, consisting of Jordan and Laura, to be the Have-Nots for the week. Later that day, Ronnie nominated Jeff and Laura for eviction. Ronnie revealed his intention to backdoor Russell that week, though his alliance felt as though Russell would have the votes to stay. Following a confrontation between Lydia and Russell, Lydia and Kevin approached Ronnie about backdooring Russell, and Natalie debated turning on him as she felt he placed a target on her back. Russell, Natalie, and Casey were selected to compete for the Power of Veto; Lydia was selected to host. On Day 14, HouseGuests competed in the "Big Brother Mint" Power of Veto competition. For this competition, HouseGuests were given an amount of money and had two minutes to attempt to get that amount of money in change. HouseGuests competed in rounds, and the HouseGuest farthest away from the goal amount each round was eliminated; the last HouseGuest remaining won the Power of Veto. Jeff was the winner. Despite initially planning on nominating Russell after the Power of Veto was used, Ronnie began to see Laura as a bigger threat, feeling she was smart enough to figure out his plans. On Day 16, Jeff used the Power of Veto to remove himself from the block, with Jordan being nominated in his place. When Ronnie lied and stated that Russell was campaigning to keep Laura in the game, he was confronted by the majority of the HouseGuests and accused of lying and playing both sides of the house. Following these events, Russell followed Ronnie around the house calling him names and taunting him for days. On Day 19, Laura became the second HouseGuest to be evicted from the house in a vote of eight to one.

Following Laura's eviction, HouseGuests competed in the "Buzzworthy" Head of Household competition. For this competition, HouseGuests launched a ball into a group of buckets in the shape of a honeycomb with the goal of being closest to the center. The HouseGuest who was closest to the center would be the Head of Household. Jessie was the winner. Though numerous HouseGuests expected Ronnie to be nominated that week, Jessie informed Natalie and Russell that he would be making his own decisions, rather than listening to the other HouseGuests. Natalie and Russell, fearing he would come after them, suggested that Casey should be targeted. On Day 20, HouseGuests competed in the "Back Yard Bash" Have-Not competition. For this competition, one HouseGuest from each clique competed and attempted to fill their opponents’ cans with plastic ice cubes; the clique with the most ice cubes in their can would be the Have-Nots for the week. The Brains clique, consisting of Chima, Michele, and Ronnie, were the Have-Nots for the week. Later that day, Jessie nominated Jordan and Michele for eviction, with the intention of seeing Casey evicted. Despite Jessie's nominations, Casey, Jeff, Jordan, and Michele were under the impression that Ronnie was the target for eviction rather than Casey. When picking players for the Power of Veto competition, Jeff, Casey, and Chima were selected to compete; Natalie was selected to host. On Day 21, HouseGuests competed in the "When Pigs Fly" Power of Veto competition. For this competition, HouseGuests dressed as pigs and dug through mud in an attempt to find truffles with point values on them, with each HouseGuest selecting four truffles to keep; the winner was the HouseGuest who had the highest total when combining the numbers on their truffles. Michele was the winner. On Day 23, Michele used the Power of Veto to remove herself from the block, with Casey being nominated in her place. On Day 26, Casey became the third HouseGuest to be evicted from the house in a vote of seven to one.

Following Casey's eviction, the HouseGuests learned that the "Cliques" twist had ended and all HouseGuests were playing the game as individuals. They also learned that the viewers would select one HouseGuest to win an unspecified "Mystery Power.” The ten remaining HouseGuests then competed in the "Big Brother Graduation" Head of Household competition. For this competition, HouseGuests sat on "graduation caps" suspended in the air while being hit by a foam diploma; the last HouseGuest remaining on their cap would be the new Head of Household. Russell was the winner. Jordan, as part of a twist in the competition, had to select three HouseGuests to be Have-Nots for the week; she chose Jessie, Kevin, and Natalie. Though the two initially had a feud, Jeff and Russell later aligned with one another. On Day 27, Russell nominated Lydia and Ronnie for eviction, with Ronnie being his main target. Though Russell was adamant about seeing Ronnie evicted, Chima, Jessie, and Natalie hoped to see Lydia evicted instead. When picking players for the Power of Veto competition, Jessie, Kevin, and Michele were selected to compete; Chima was selected to host. On Day 28, HouseGuests competed in the "Vini Vidi Veto" Power of Veto competition. For this competition, HouseGuests had to determine the quantity of an object used to make an object. Each round, HouseGuests could either stay or fold; folding would allow them to continue in the game whereas the HouseGuest with the answer closest to the correct one would earn a point, and the farthest away was eliminated. Michele was the winner of the Power of Veto. On Day 30, Michele chose not to use the Power of Veto on either nominee. Following this, Jeff learned that he had won the power of the "Coup d'Etat", in which he could overthrow the Head of Household and make his own nominations on the spot; this power could only be used at the next two evictions, and the current Head of Household and Power of Veto holder were unable to be nominated. On Day 33, Ronnie became the fourth HouseGuest to be evicted from the house in a vote of four to three.

Following Ronnie's eviction, HouseGuests competed in the "Say what?" Head of Household competition. For this competition, HouseGuests were asked true or false questions about fan-submitted messages they had heard the previous night; an incorrect answer resulted in elimination, and the last HouseGuest remaining was the winner. Chima was the winner. On Day 34, HouseGuests competed in "The Goods" luxury competition. For this competition, actor Jeremy Piven entered the house to inform the HouseGuests of the competition. The HouseGuests split into teams and were required to fill a station wagon with various items that were worth different numbers of points; the team would only earn a point for the items they fit into their car, and the team with the most points would earn the right to see the film The Goods. The team of Chima, Jordan, Jessie, Natalie, and Russell won the competition, meaning Jeff, Kevin, Lydia, and Michele were the Have-Nots for the week. Later that day, Chima nominated Lydia and Russell for eviction. When picking players for the Power of Veto competition, Jeff, Kevin, and Natalie were selected to compete; Michele was selected to host. On Day 35, HouseGuests competed in the "BB Farm" Power of Veto competition. For this competition, HouseGuests reached through a fence and attempted to get twelve eggs from the opposite side of the fence to them; the first HouseGuest to get twelve eggs would win the Power of Veto. Kevin was the winner. On Day 37, Kevin chose not to use the Power of Veto. On Day 40, Jeff used the Coup d'État, thus overthrowing Head of Household Chima. He removed Lydia and Russell from the block, replacing them with Jessie and Natalie. Due to using the Coup d'État, Jeff was ineligible to vote during this eviction, as was Chima. Jessie then became the fifth HouseGuest to be evicted from the house in a vote of three to two. He became the first member of the Jury of Seven.

Following Jessie's eviction, HouseGuests competed in the "Hit the Road" Head of Household competition. Due to the Coup d'État being used, all of the HouseGuests were able to compete. For this competition, HouseGuests faced off two at a time and were asked questions about past competitions played this season; the winner of each round would select the next two HouseGuests to face off, with the last HouseGuest remaining being the winner. Michele was the winner. On Day 41, HouseGuests competed in the "Chaosserole" Have-Not competition. For this competition, HouseGuests competed in pairs and had to find matching casseroles and place them on a podium labeled with a certain day of the week or luxury prize; if the HouseGuests put a correct pair on the podium, they earned food for that day of the week. The HouseGuests earned food for every day of the week except Monday. Though the house was split, the HouseGuests were unsure of which side Michele would stay with; she later aligned herself with Jeff, Jordan, and Russell and stated that she hoped to see Chima evicted. Later that day, Michele nominated Chima and Natalie for eviction. Though she had often disregarded the rules for the show, Chima began to break rules more consistently following Jessie's eviction, including covering up cameras, refusing to go to the Diary Room, and not wearing her microphone. Early on Day 42, Chima broke further rules when she refused to wear her microphone and later threw it into the Jacuzzi when Kevin brought her microphone to her. Following this, Chima refused to take an exchange microphone from the storage room. Following further refusal to enter the Diary Room, producer Allison Grodner spoke through the intercom and convinced Chima to come to the Diary Room. Hours later, the remaining HouseGuests learned that Chima had been expelled from the game. On Day 43, the HouseGuests learned that Michele's duty as Head of Household had been nullified as Chima was one of Michele's nominations, and that a new Head of Household competition would take place later that day.

Following Chima's expulsion, HouseGuests competed in the "BB Invitational Golf Tournament" Head of Household competition. For this competition, HouseGuests took turns putting a golf ball in an attempt to get it into a hole. If a HouseGuest missed, their ball went into a rotating wheel, with various numbers labeling sections in the wheel. The HouseGuest whose ball landed in the highest number each round was eliminated, with the last HouseGuest remaining winning the competition. When a HouseGuest was eliminated, they could claim a prize, one of which was the Head of Household position. Jordan was the winner. On Day 44, Jordan nominated Lydia and Natalie for eviction. Shortly afterwards, Kevin, in an attempt to save himself and his allies, lied to Jeff and claimed that he had heard Russell stating he would evict Jeff the following week; Jeff told Jordan, and the two believed him. When picking players for the Power of Veto competition, Jeff, Kevin, and Michele were selected to compete. On Day 47, HouseGuests competed live in the "Before or After" Power of Veto competition. For this competition, HouseGuests had to determine whether one event in the house happened before or after another event; an incorrect answer resulted in elimination, and the last HouseGuest remaining was the winner. Jordan was the winner. Minutes later, she chose not to use the Power of Veto. Lydia then became the sixth HouseGuest to be evicted from the house in a vote of three to one. She became the second member of the Jury of Seven.

Following Lydia's eviction, HouseGuests competed in the "Can Do" Head of Household competition. For this competition, HouseGuests stood atop a platform and attempted to drop aluminum cans into plastic tubes; the first HouseGuest to drop twenty-four cans into their tube would be the winner. Jeff was the winner. With the fewest cans in their tubes, Michele and Russell became the Have-Nots for the week. Owing to the lie that Kevin had told Jeff, both Jeff and Jordan hoped to see Russell evicted. In an attempt to save themselves, Kevin and Natalie made a deal to get to the final four with Jeff and Jordan, and Jeff told them he would nominate them as pawns in an attempt to backdoor Russell. On Day 48, Jeff nominated Kevin and Natalie for eviction. Though Jeff continued to assure Michele and Russell that the plan was to evict Kevin, the two became suspicious that the plan was to backdoor one of them. On Day 49, HouseGuests competed in the "Otev the Ape" Power of Veto competition. For this competition, HouseGuests were given a riddle by Otev the Ape and searched through various bananas in the backyard with the names of previously evicted HouseGuests on them to find the banana that solved the riddle. The last HouseGuest to bring Otev the correct banana, or the HouseGuest who brought an incorrect banana, was eliminated each round. Jeff was the winner of the Power of Veto. On Day 51, Jeff used the Power of Veto to remove Kevin from the block, with Russell being nominated in his place. Following his nomination, Russell engaged in numerous arguments with his fellow HouseGuests. On Day 54, Russell became the seventh HouseGuest to be evicted from the house in a vote of three to zero. He became the third member of the Jury of Seven.

Following Russell's eviction, HouseGuests competed in "The S'more, the Merrier" Head of Household competition. For this competition, HouseGuests walked back and forth transferring cups of hot chocolate to a jar on the opposite side of the backyard. The first HouseGuest to fill their jar and claim the ball inside would be the winner of the competition. Kevin was the winner. Despite making a deal with him the previous week, Kevin and Natalie made a plan to backdoor Jeff as they saw him as their biggest threat. Though this was his plan, Kevin and Natalie also debated taking out Michele, and thus feared that Jeff could win the Power of Veto and save Jordan if she were nominated; should Jeff use the Power of Veto on Jordan, it would force Kevin to nominate Natalie for eviction. On Day 55, Kevin nominated Jeff and Michele for eviction. Later that day, Kevin discovered a secret room in the Head of Household bedroom known as Pandora's Box; upon entering the room, he discovered a box and learned that placing his hand inside the box would release $10,000 into the house. He did so and became locked inside the box while the money fell into the backyard; the HouseGuests were able to keep the money and were required to find a key to unlock Kevin from the room. On Day 56, HouseGuests competed in the "Morphomatic" Power of Veto competition. For this competition, HouseGuests had to figure out which two faces of the HouseGuests made up a set of alien faces. The HouseGuest who finished the competition in the fastest time was the winner. Michele was the winner of the Power of Veto. On Day 58, Michele used the Power of Veto to remove herself from the block, with Jordan being nominated in her place. On Day 61, Jeff became the eighth HouseGuest to be evicted when Kevin cast a tiebreaker vote in Jordan's favor. He became the fourth member of the Jury of Seven.

Following Jeff's eviction, HouseGuests competed in the "Fact or Fiction" Head of Household competition. For this competition, HouseGuests were given statements and had to determine whether each statement was fact or fiction. Natalie was the winner. That night, HouseGuests competed in the "Big Brother Shopping Spree" luxury competition. For this competition, HouseGuests competed with a partner and communicated with each other from across a wall in an attempt to find matching articles of clothing; the group had ten minutes to complete a full outfit, with whatever time they had left over being used to give the HouseGuests a shopping spree. On Day 62, Natalie was presented with Pandora's Box and learned that her boyfriend was inside; however, if she chose to enter and see him, she would give up her right to compete in the final Power of Veto competition; she accepted the offer and entered Pandora's Box. Despite this, she lied to her fellow HouseGuests about what had happened. Later that day, Natalie nominated Kevin and Michele for eviction. On Day 63, HouseGuests competed in the "There Ain't No Party Like A Veto Block Party" final Power of Veto competition. For this competition, HouseGuests were given twenty clues, lined up ten by ten, and matched blocks with HouseGuests’ names on them with the clues provided; the HouseGuest to complete this in the fastest time would be the winner. Kevin was the winner of the final Power of Veto. On Day 66, Kevin used the Power of Veto to remove himself from the block, with Jordan being nominated in his place. Minutes later, he cast the sole vote to evict Michele from the house. She became the fifth member of the Jury of Seven.

Following Michele's eviction, the final three HouseGuests began competing in the first part of the final Head of Household competition, "Log Jam." The HouseGuests held onto their key that was suspended in the air for as long as possible while trying not to fall off of a moving log. Jordan was the first to fall off the log while Kevin won the first part of the competition and advanced to the third and final round. Jordan and Natalie were the only two HouseGuests to compete in the second round, which determined who would face Kevin in the final round. In the second round, called "Heads Will Roll", each HouseGuest entered the backyard alone with a giant game table with the numbers one through ten. Each player used balls with names of previous Head of Household winners and placed the ball with the correct name into the hole that corresponded with the numerical order in which they reigned. The player had a two-minute time limit, and the player with the most correct answers won. Jordan was the winner. Kevin and Jordan competed in the final part of the Head of Household competition called "Jury Statements." The players had to guess the ending of statements made by the jury members. There were two possible answers, and the players had to guess the correct ending by picking A or B. Jordan was the winner, becoming the final Head of Household of the season. Jordan evicted Kevin from the house, making Jordan and Natalie the Final Two. Jordan was crowned the winner of Big Brother 11 in a vote of five to two, with Chima's vote being replaced with a vote from the viewers.

== Episodes ==
No. overall	No. in season	Title	Original release date	U.S. viewers (millions)
351	1	"Episode 1"	July 9, 2009	6.59
352	2	"Episode 2"	July 12, 2009	6.29
353	3	"Episode 3"	July 14, 2009	6.16
354	4	"Episode 4"	July 16, 2009	5.63
355	5	"Episode 5"	July 19, 2009	5.57
356	6	"Episode 6"	July 21, 2009	5.72
357	7	"Episode 7"	July 23, 2009	6.39
358	8	"Episode 8"	July 26, 2009	6.08
359	9	"Episode 9"	July 28, 2009	6.07
360	10	"Episode 10"	July 30, 2009	6.46
361	11	"Episode 11"	August 2, 2009	6.77
362	12	"Episode 12"	August 4, 2009	6.40
363	13	"Episode 13"	August 6, 2009	6.44
364	14	"Episode 14"	August 9, 2009	7.15
365	15	"Episode 15"	August 11, 2009	6.78
366	16	"Episode 16"	August 13, 2009	7.48
367	17	"Episode 17"	August 16, 2009	7.64
368	18	"Episode 18"	August 18, 2009	7.98
369	19	"Episode 19"	August 20, 2009	6.75
370	20	"Episode 20"	August 23, 2009	7.48
371	21	"Episode 21"	August 25, 2009	7.27
372	22	"Episode 22"	August 27, 2009	7.79
373	23	"Episode 23"	August 30, 2009	7.44
374	24	"Episode 24"	September 1, 2009	7.79
375	25	"Episode 25"	September 3, 2009	6.81
376	26	"Episode 26"	September 6, 2009	5.99
377	27	"Episode 27"	September 8, 2009	7.89
378	28	"Episode 28"	September 10, 2009	7.44
379	29	"Episode 29"	September 13, 2009	6.59
380	30	"Episode 30"	September 15, 2009	7.78

== Voting history ==
Color key:

Winner
Runner-up
Head of Household
Nominated for eviction
Immune from eviction
Team immunity
Evicted
Expelled by production

Voting history (season 11)
	Clique phase			Individual phase									
	Week 1	Week 2	Week 3	Week 4	Week 5		Week 6		Week 7	Week 8	Week 9	Week 10	
	Week 1	Week 2	Week 3	Week 4	Day 34	Day 40	Day 41	Day 43	Week 7	Week 8	Week 9	Day 73	Finale
Head of Household	Jessie	Ronnie	Jessie	Russell	Chima	Jeff (Note: On Day 26, Julie informed the HouseGuests that a mystery power would be secretly awarded to a HouseGuest by the audience vote: the Coup d'État, which was awarded to Jeff. This gave Jeff the power to overthrow the reigning Head of Household and name his own nominations at the eviction ceremony. Jeff used the power during week 5. Chima and Kevin were immune to Jeff's nominations.)	Michele	Jordan	Jeff	Kevin	Natalie	Jordan	(None)
Nominations (initial)	Chima; Lydia	Jeff; Laura	Jordan; Michele	Lydia; Ronnie	Lydia; Russell	(None)	Chima; Natalie	Lydia; Natalie	Kevin; Natalie	Jeff; Michele	Kevin; Michele	(None)	(None)
Veto winner	Russell	Jeff	Michele	Michele	Kevin	(None)	(None)	Jordan	Jeff	Michele	Kevin	(None)	(None)
Nominations (final)	Braden; Chima	Jordan; Laura	Casey; Jordan	Lydia; Ronnie	Lydia; Russell	Jessie; Natalie	(None)	Lydia; Natalie	Natalie; Russell	Jeff; Jordan	Jordan; Michele	Kevin; Natalie	(None)
Jordan	Chima	Nominated	Nominated	Ronnie	Nominations void	Jessie	No vote	Head of Household	Russell	Nominated	Nominated	Kevin (Note: As Head of Household, Jordan chose to evict Kevin.)	Winner
Natalie	Braden (Note: This player received immunity because their teammate was Head of Household.)	Jordan	Casey	Lydia	Nominations void	Nominated	Nominated	Nominated	Nominated	Jeff	Head of Household	Nominated	Runner-up
Kevin	Braden	Laura	Casey	Ronnie	Nominations void	Jessie	No vote	Natalie	Russell	Jeff (Note: As the vote was tied, the Head of Household cast the tie-breaker vote.)	Michele	Evicted (Day 73)	Natalie
Michele	Chima	Laura	Casey	Ronnie	Nominations void	Jessie	Head of Household	Lydia	Russell	Jordan	Nominated	Evicted (Day 66)	Jordan
Jeff	Chima	Laura	Casey	Ronnie	Nominations void	Coup d'État	No vote	Lydia	Head of Household	Nominated	Evicted (Day 61)		Jordan
Russell	Braden	Laura	Jordan	Head of Household	Nominated	Natalie	No vote	Lydia	Nominated	Evicted (Day 54)			Natalie
Lydia	Braden	Laura	Casey	Nominated	Nominated	Natalie	No vote	Nominated	Evicted (Day 47)				Jordan
Chima	Nominated	Laura	Casey	Lydia	Head of Household		Nominated	Expelled (Day 42)					Jordan (Note: As Chima had been expelled from the game, the audience voted in her place.)
Jessie	Braden	Laura	Head of Household	Lydia	Nominations void	Nominated	Evicted (Day 40)						Jordan
Ronnie	Braden	Head of Household	Casey	Nominated	Evicted (Day 33)								
Casey	Chima	Laura	Nominated	Evicted (Day 26)									
Laura	Chima	Nominated	Evicted (Day 19)										
Braden	Nominated	Evicted (Day 12)											
Evicted	Braden; 6 of 11 votes to evict	Laura; 8 of 9 votes to evict	Casey; 7 of 8 votes to evict	Ronnie; 4 of 7 votes to evict	(None)	Jessie; 3 of 5 votes to evict	Eviction cancelled (Note: Chima was expelled from the game on day 42. As Chima had been nominated for eviction, production reset the game and Michele was stripped of her Head of Household duties.)	Lydia; 3 of 4 votes to evict	Russell; 3 of 3 votes to evict	Jeff; 2 of 3 votes to evict	Michele; Kevin's choice to evict	Kevin; Jordan's choice to evict	Jordan; 5 votes to win
Evicted	Braden; 6 of 11 votes to evict	Laura; 8 of 9 votes to evict	Casey; 7 of 8 votes to evict	Ronnie; 4 of 7 votes to evict	(None)	Jessie; 3 of 5 votes to evict	Eviction cancelled	Lydia; 3 of 4 votes to evict	Russell; 3 of 3 votes to evict	Jeff; 2 of 3 votes to evict	Michele; Kevin's choice to evict	Kevin; Jordan's choice to evict	Natalie; 2 votes to win

== Production ==
=== Development ===
Big Brother 11 was produced by Endemol USA and Allison Grodner Productions with Allison Grodner, Rich Meehan and Scott Einziger returned as executive producers. This season of the program was announced on September 18, 2008, two days after the season finale of Big Brother 10. Casting for the program began during the final week of Big Brother 10 with potential applicants submitting video tape submissions. Open auditions began on April 1, 2009, in Michigan by local CBS affiliate WLNS-TV and continued across the nation in various cities including Los Angeles, California, Chicago, Illinois, Waverly, Iowa, and Columbus, Ohio. Applications and video tape submissions were due by May 4, 2009. Applicants chosen to be a finalist went to Los Angeles, California from which applicants were narrowed down to a pool of forty finalists. Julie Chen interviewed casting director Robyn Kass and former HouseGuests Mike Malin and Brian Hart about the upcoming season and their experiences going through casting on March 19, 2009. Julie Chen confirmed that she would continue to host Big Brother during her pregnancy despite tabloid rumors stating she would take maternity leave.

=== House ===
As with each season since Big Brother 6, the program was filmed at CBS Studios in Studio City, California. The production team was located in the second story of the House which included the story department, audio department and the switchers and shaders. The House was equipped with 52 cameras and 80 microphones to record the participants. The art department that created the competitions for the program was located outside the House. The House theme was eco-friendly and modern California living was released on June 29 during media day, where select members of the press were invited to spend 12 hours inside the House. Official pictures of the House interior were released by CBS on the same day, showing the living room, bedrooms, kitchen, bathroom, lounge room and backyard. The living room featured chipboard walls with fake plants along the side.

The spa that was featured in the House since season nine was removed and replaced with exercise bikes that when operated would power a light bulb. The former spa room featured recycled products like wood, plastic and aluminum turned into wallpaper. There was also a shipping container-based bathroom, an open kitchen that paid respects to the Pacific Rim and a portable garden where the HouseGuests would collect compost and grow their own herb garden was added to the backyard. The House included four bedrooms each varying in design and comfort. The Head of Household bedroom featured a penthouse design with a waterfall and a faux ocean front view while the first bedroom featured a VIP club lounge design, while the second bedroom resembled the bottom of a public pool and featured a slide and beds that were designed to look like flotation devices. The third room initially used by the HouseGuests was later turned into the Have-Not room, which was a simplistic gray bedroom with metal slabs used as beds.

=== Prizes ===
The 13 HouseGuests this season were competing for the main prize of $500,000. The winner of the series, determined by the previously evicted HouseGuests, would win the $500,000 prize, while the Runner-Up would receive a $50,000 prize. Other than the main prize, various luxuries and prizes were given out throughout the season.

The America's Favorite HouseGuest, a popularity contest first introduced in season 7 returns. As the title implies, beginning this season, any HouseGuests, including the winner, is eligible for the $25,000 prize where the viewer's vote were the sole determinant of the award. While any HouseGuests are eligible, HouseGuests who either walked or forcibly removed from the game removes the eligibility for the award; Chima Simone was expelled during the season, making her ineligible to receive the prize.

== Broadcast ==
Big Brother 11 was broadcast on CBS from July 9, 2009, to September 15, 2009. This season lasted a total of 73 days, making it the third shortest season of the series to date. This season featured no changes to the schedule that was used in the previous edition, with episodes airing on Tuesdays, Thursday, and Sunday each week. The Thursday episode, which aired at 9 pm Eastern Time, featured the live eviction and subsequent Head of Household competition taking place. During the live eviction, the show was hosted by Julie Chen. The Sunday episode, which aired at 8 pm Eastern Time, featured the food competition and nomination ceremony, as well as some highlights from the previous days. The Tuesday episode featured the Power of Veto competition and the Power of Veto ceremony, along with more highlights of recent events in the game. Some changes to the scheduling format were made. Chima's expulsion from the game, for example, led to various changes in the formatting of the television broadcasts, and led to the cancellation of the upcoming Double Eviction week. The series was broadcast on Global Television Network in Canada. For the first time in the history of the show, Big Brother had a two-hour live season finale, which aired on September 15, an increase from the usual hour.

Much like the previous editions, the live feeds were also available again for this season. HouseGuests enter the house a few days before the premiere, and the feeds are not live for the first few days. They later go live after the broadcast of the launch episode. This season saw the cancellation of the spin-off series House Calls: The Big Brother Talk Show. This made it the first season since Big Brother 4 to not feature the companion show, though various events and talk shows have been hosted by the live feed providers since the show's cancellation. This season did, however, see the return of the Big Brother: After Dark spin-off series, which aired on Showtime Too nightly from midnight to 3 a.m. Eastern Time. The show served as a live feed into the house, and was edited only for slanderous statements and music copyrights. Much like the previous season, Big Brother 11 is available for digital purchasing on iTunes and Amazon.com. Big Brother maintained an online platform with live subscription feeds from RealNetworks, a redesigned and relaunched website, online videos, full episodes, a fantasy game and segments on Inside Dish with Ross Mathews. For the first time Big Brother launched two Twitter accounts; one featured updates from the production staff and one featured updates from the current Head of Household. Episodes of Big Brother continued to be streamed on CBS Mobile Channel on FLOTV. Mobile users were also able to interact and influence the show through SMS text messaging and, for the first time, a simulation game based on Big Brother was also available to mobile customers.

== Reception ==
The season premiere of Big Brother 11, which aired on CBS on July 9, attracted 6.68 million viewers, with a 2.3 rating in adults 18–49. The rating was the highest in its timeslot, with its nearest competition, a repeat of Bones on Fox bringing in 5.65 million viewers. The season premiere was even in adults 18-49 and adults 18-34 demographics, added 280,000 viewers and was up 5% in households when compared to the season premiere of Big Brother 10. Ratings for the show entered into a steady decline after the premiere, the following Sunday episode that was transmitted on July 12 was down 0.39 million viewers and pulled a 2.0 rating in the adults 18–49. Repeats of The Simpsons and King of the Hill on Fox won the adults 18-34 demographic but placed second in all other measures. The program hit a season low in adults 18-49 when the first eviction on Thursday, July 16 posted a 1.9 in adults 18–49. The Sunday, July 19 episode attracted 5.57 million viewers a season low in terms of viewership. Beginning with the Tuesday, July 21 episode viewership started to gradually increase with the episode attracting 5.76 million viewers and a 2.0 rating in the adults 18-49 demographic. The second eviction which featured Laura Crosby being evicted from the House attracted 6.39 million viewers and a 2.1 rating in adults 18-49 and a 4.0 rating with an 8 share in households. The second eviction was up 8% in households, 11% in adults 18-49 and 14% in total viewers for the week at the time it was the second highest rated episode of the season behind the season premiere.

The following Sunday episode that aired on July 26 experienced a minor drop in ratings attracting 6.08 million viewers and a 2.0 rating in adults 18–49. The Sunday episode was up 5% in adults 18–49, 6% in households and added 510,000 viewers (up 9%) from the previous week. The episode highlighting the expulsion of Chima Simone was the highest rated episode in the adults 18-49 demographic with a 3.0 rating and the third highest in viewers and total households with 7.98 million viewers and a 4.8 respectively. The Sunday highlight episode fell to second place in its timeslot for the first time on August 9 when NBC Sunday Night Football began airing on NBC. By August 20 ratings for the season were up 5% in overall viewers when compared to Big Brother 10. The season finale attracted 7.78 million viewers and was the second highest episode in the adults 18-49 demographic for the entire season. Overall Big Brother 11 was up 7% in total viewers (7.19 million) when compared to Big Brother 10, up 5% in adults 18–34, up 3% in adults 25-54 and even in adults 18–49. Big Brother 11 delivered 100 million page views and 15.3 million videos on CBS.com and various affiliated sites by the end of the season. The viewing public placed more than 24 million votes during the season including over 11 million votes for the seventh jury vote.

=== Comparison to British edition ===
After two weeks into the season several news sites began to compare the American and British version of the show, which was six weeks into its series at the time. During the first several weeks ratings for both shows were declining. The launch of Big Brother 2009 aired on Channel 4 in the United Kingdom premiered on June 4 attracted 4.8 million viewers, with a 22% viewing share. The show was down compared to the launch of Big Brother 2008 but won its timeslot. Ratings continued to decline with the first official eviction of the series, that aired on June 12 only pulling in 2.9 million people, 13% of the viewing audience.

In an article by The Hollywood Reporter, an American trade publication, noted the tenth series of the British version was averaging 2 million viewers and a 10.1% audience share. At the time the show was six weeks into its run and was down 33% on its performance from the previous year and very down when compared to previous series in where some average 6 million viewers per episode. Mimi Turner, author of the article, noted the show was "running out of steam" and until the tenth series the show delivered significant youth audiences on air and online. Bill Gorman of TVByTheNumbers, an American television website, commented on the article by saying "Not sure if this is a glimpse of things to come for the US version of Big Brother or not."

Executives from Endemol, the production company for Big Brother worldwide, defended the format which is transmitted in 41 territories and noted the season premiere of the 11th season in America won its time slot with year-to-year growth. Other comparisons noted were that the finale of ninth season of Italy's Grande Fratello pulled 7.9 million viewers with a 36% audience share and how in Argentina the show has been rested for a few years and returns with stronger ratings. Paul Jonson, global head of marketing and brand partnerships for Endemol Group, noted that using audience averages to figure out how the show performs does not work since the audience builds up until the finale. Jonson also noted that the series continued to rate very well when compared to the time slot average for Channel 4.

After ratings for Big Brother 11 in America began to increase Anna Pickard, for The Guardian in the United Kingdom, compared the two concurrent seasons noting the format differences between the American and British versions of the show calling the two "different beasts." Various points mentioned that contributed to the increase in ratings was the number of episodes per week, format differences, lack of live feeds from the House in Britain. In another article on the same site noted the American version experienced a "ratings renaissance" in a market "which the format has not traditionally done well." After the provisional cancellation of Big Brother in the United Kingdom, American trade publications like USA Today began reporting on the cancellation while others like Variety were also reporting various pickups around the world including the twelfth season of the American version, Big Brother 10 in Germany, Grande Fratello 10 in Italy and HaAh HaGadol 2 in Israel.

=== Critical response ===
During the first week of the program several HouseGuests made controversial remarks during several arguments on the live Internet feeds. Many homophobic comments made by Jeff during an argument with Russell after the first Power of Veto ceremony were edited out of the first Tuesday broadcast episode while the comments remained uncensored online.

Another HouseGuest, Braden, made several racist and derogatory comments after the first Power of Veto ceremony to fellow HouseGuests Kevin and Lydia in an argument. The argument was edited during the first live eviction show on Thursday but played unedited on the live feeds. During the live portion of the show, Chima brought up the comments made by Braden again during her final plea speech to her fellow HouseGuests. Chima also stated Braden used a sexually insulting word to describe Big Brother host Julie Chen. This comment was made at the conclusion of a "Julie Says" game played by the HouseGuests a couple nights earlier as viewed on Big Brother After Dark.

The editing of the events in question during the broadcast episodes created controversy for the show and CBS, the broadcaster of Big Brother. While the comments could not air due to Federal Communications Commission regulations, the way the events were edited caused critics and fans of the show to claim it was being edited to make the HouseGuests look good to the viewing public. One critic suggests the recent decline in ratings was due to the editing process of the show.

Chima revealed to her fellow HouseGuests on the live Internet feeds and on Big Brother: After Dark after the eviction that she was informed in the Diary Room by Big Brother, the producers, that her comments were censored during the live broadcast.

"I said, I don't think it's fair because I don't think they showed when it first was said, and I was like, 'If someone's a racist, they should be portrayed as one. You shouldn't edit it to make them look good.'"

CBS released a statement on July 17, 2009, regarding the censoring of the controversial statements saying the statements in question were offensive and did not meet the network's standards. CBS also stated that "any views or opinions expressed in personal commentary by a HouseGuest appearing on Big Brother, either on any live feed from the house or the broadcast, are those of the individuals speaking and do not represent the views or opinions of CBS or the producers of the program." National Public Radio's pop culture correspondent Linda Holmes noted that CBS officially disavowing such statements while allowing them to continue amounts to a publicity grab for the show and for the network:

"This show is meant to get a good part of its attention from the difference between what you see online and what you see on the show. If it manages to cast a hard-charging racist whose work only appears online, it can seize all the attention of a scandal while claiming that it's tastefully trying to protect viewers from anything 'offensive.'"

== Ratings ==
"Rating" is the estimated percentage of all televisions tuned to the show, and "share" is the percentage of all televisions in use that are tuned in. "Viewers" is the estimated number viewers that watched a program either while it was broadcast or watched via DVR on the same day the program was broadcast.

Key
†	Season high for that night of the week

#	Air Date	Rating	Share	18-49 (rating/share)	Viewers (millions)	Rank (timeslot)	Source
1	Thursday, July 9	4.4	8	2.3/8	6.59	1	
2	Sunday July 12^{1}	3.9	7	2.0/6	6.29	1	
3	Tuesday, July 14	3.9	6	2.1/6	6.16	3	
4	Thursday, July 16	3.7	7	1.9/7	5.63	1	
5	Sunday, July 19	3.5	7	1.9/6	5.57	1	
6	Tuesday, July 21	3.7	6	2.0/6	5.79	3	
7	Thursday, July 23	4.0	8	2.1/7	6.39	1	
8	Sunday, July 26	3.7	7	2.0/7	6.08	1	
9	Tuesday, July 28	3.8	6	2.1/6	6.07	2	
10	Thursday, July 30	4.1	8	2.1/8	6.46	1	
11	Sunday, August 2	4.2	8	2.2/7	6.77	1	
12	Tuesday, August 4	4.0	7	2.4/7	6.40	2	
13	Thursday, August 6	4.1	8	2.3/8	6.44	2	
14	Sunday, August 9	4.2	8	2.6/8	7.15	2	
15	Tuesday, August 11	4.4	7	2.4/7	6.68	2	
16	Thursday, August 13	4.8	9	2.6/9	7.61	2	
17	Sunday, August 16^{2}	4.6	8	2.6/8	7.64 †	1	
18	Tuesday, August 18	4.8	8	3.0/9	7.98 †	2	
19	Thursday, August 20	4.3	8	2.2/8	6.75	2	
20	Sunday, August 23	4.3	8	2.6/8	7.48	2	
21	Tuesday, August 25	4.5	7	2.5/7	7.27	2	
22	Thursday, August 27	4.8	8	2.7/9	7.79 †	1	
23	Sunday, August 30	4.5	8	2.6/8	7.44	2	
24	Tuesday, September 1	4.9	8	2.6/7	7.79	2	
25	Thursday, September 3	4.2	7	2.3/8	6.81	1	
26	Sunday, September 6	3.6	7	1.9/7	5.99	1	
27	Tuesday, September 8	4.8	7	2.7/7	7.89	2	
28	Thursday, September 10	4.8	8	2.6/7	7.62	2	
29	Sunday, September 13^{1}	4.0	6	2.1/5	6.59	2	
30	Tuesday, September 15	4.8	8	2.8/8	7.78	2	

- ^Note 1: Episode was delayed from its normal start time due to a sport overrun.
- ^Note 2: Individual information not available for rating/share for households due to a golf overrun.
