= Jeff Schroeder (television personality) =

American talk show host (born 1978)

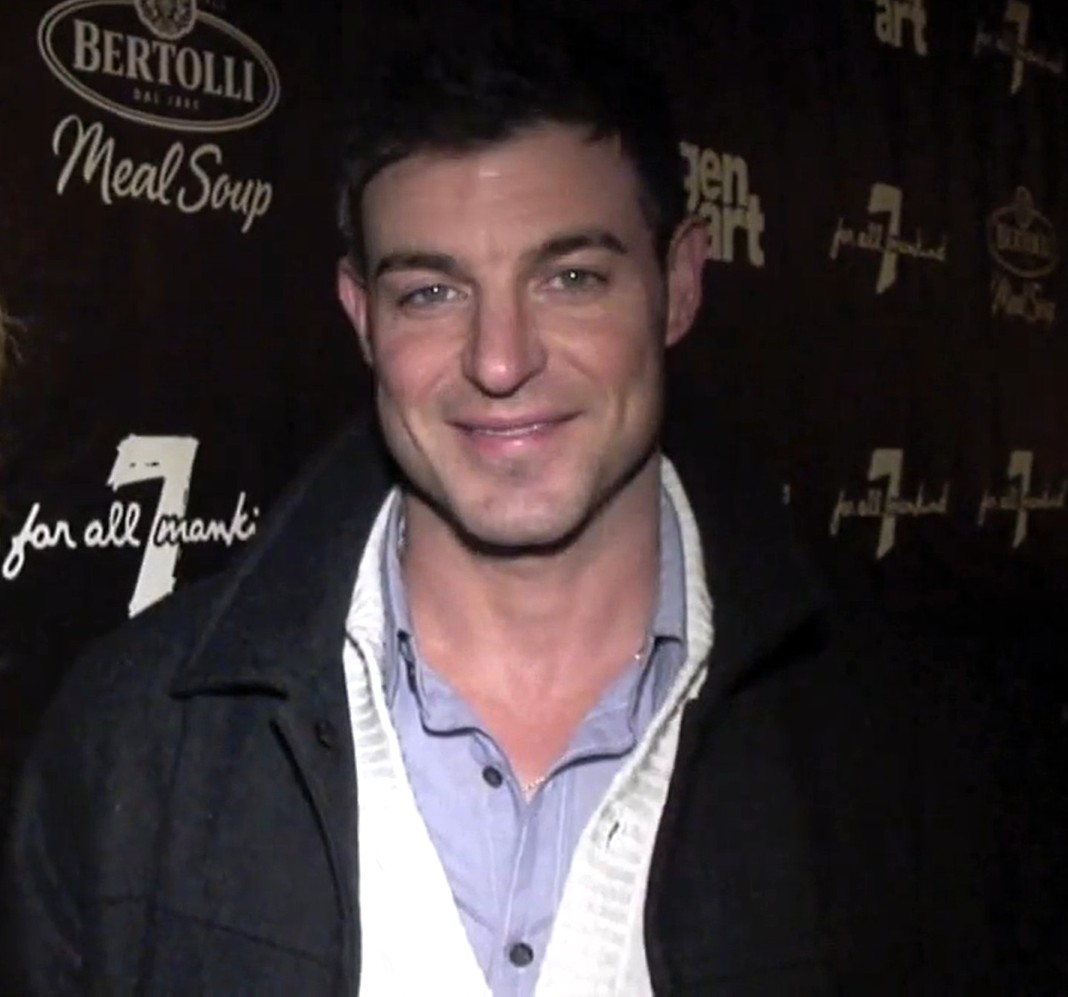
- Schroeder in 2012
- Born: June 5, 1978 (age 48); Norridge, Illinois, U.S.
- Occupation: Talk show host
- Years active: 2009–present
- Height: 1.80 m (5 ft 11 in)
- Spouse: Jordan Lloyd (m. 2016)
- Children: 2

Jeff Schroeder (born June 5, 1978) is an American television and digital media host. He is known for appearing on Big Brother and The Amazing Race, hosting television and online programs, and creating content with his wife, Jordan Lloyd, through their YouTube channel Jeff & Jordan TV and the podcast TogetherMess. Schroeder is a co-host on Great Day Colorado and has also hosted Daily Blast Live, a daily entertainment and news program, Big Brother Live Chat and Survivor Live. Schroeder is also a former two-time contestant on Big Brother, racer on The Amazing Race, and resident on Marriage Boot Camp. He also starred in the 2016 TV movie Wish for Christmas alongside Joey Lawrence, Leigh-Allyn Baker, and Bill Engvall.

== Early life ==
Schroeder was born in Norridge, Illinois and is of German and Italian descent.

== Reality television ==
=== Big Brother 11 ===
Schroeder had a close relationship with Jordan Lloyd, which led to a relationship outside the house. On Day 1, Jeff was placed in the Athletes Clique. When his clique won HoH the first week, he was guaranteed safety. Despite being a part of their team, Jeff was seen as distant from his teammates, and became good friends with Jordan and Braden, both of whom are on the popular clique. On Day 8, a series of homophobic comments made by Jeff during an argument with Russell after the first Power of Veto ceremony were edited out of the first Tuesday broadcast episode while the comments remained uncensored online. The comment caused much controversy outside of the house. On Day 13, Jeff was nominated alongside his ally Laura by Head of Household Ronnie. However, on Day 14, Jeff won the second Power of Veto of the season, and used it on himself. His good friend Jordan was named the replacement nominee, but survived the eviction. On Day 33, it was revealed that America had chosen Jeff to win the power of the Coup d'État, which would allow him to change the nominations just moments before the live eviction. On Day 40, he chose to exercise this power, taking Lydia and Russell off the block in favor of Jessie and Natalie. This led to Jesse's eviction. On Day 47, Jeff became the eighth Head of Household of the season, making it his second win of the year. On Day 49, he won his second Power of Veto, making it the second week in a row that the HoH won the Veto as well. The first person to do this was Jordan. On Day 55, Jeff was nominated alongside Michele by Head of Household Kevin. When Michele won the Veto, Jordan was named her replacement nominee. On Day 61, Jeff was evicted by Kevin's tiebreaker vote after Natalie voted to evict Jeff and Michele voted to evict Jordan. On Day 73, he won the "America's Favorite Houseguest" prize, awarding him $25,000. He was a part of the jury and voted for Jordan to win.

=== The Amazing Race 16 ===
After Big Brother, Jeff along with Jordan Lloyd, appeared on The Amazing Race 16. They came in seventh place.

=== Big Brother 12–13 ===
In 2010, Jeff, along with Jordan, entered the Big Brother 12 house to host the fifth Power of Veto competition, "Lover's Lane". Later in 2010, Jeff became a part of the online CBS show Around the World for Free. In 2011, Jeff and Jordan returned to Big Brother, this time as HouseGuest for Big Brother 13. Their appearance was due to the "Dynamic Duos" twist, which saw three pairs from past seasons enter the House against eight new HouseGuests. Jeff was ultimately evicted during a Double Eviction on Day 55, earning seventh place.

== Television and digital media ==
Beginning Big Brother 14, Schroeder began hosting the online Big Brother recap show, Big Brother Live Chat, where he would interview houseguests after their evictions. The following season, he also began interviewing the houseguests before they entered the house.

In 2014, Schroeder took over as host of Survivor Live, a recap show similar to Big Brother Live Chat where Schroeder interviews the contestants that have been voted off the show the day following the episode. His first season hosting the show is for Survivor: San Juan del Sur.

Schroeder and Jordan Lloyd run Jeff & Jordan TV, a YouTube channel featuring videos about their family life, reality television and their joint media projects. In 2023, they began hosting the weekly podcast Togethermess, covering marriage, parenting, popular culture. In 2026, they launched Couch Jury, a live Big Brother discussion and reaction program on Jeff & Jordan TV.

== Personal life ==
Jeff and his wife Jordan Lloyd have two sons named Layton and Lawson.
