= Big Brother 13 (American season) =

American reality television series (season 13)

Coordinates: 34°8′40.12″N 118°23′20.71″W

Big Brother
- Season 13
- Big Brother 13 title card
- Hosted by: Julie Chen
- No. of days: 75
- No. of houseguests: 14
- Winner: Rachel Reilly
- Runner-up: Porsche Briggs
- America's Favorite Houseguest: Jeff Schroeder
- Companion show: Big Brother: After Dark
- No. of episodes: 29

Release
- Original network: CBS
- Original release: July 7 – September 14, 2011

Additional information
- Filming dates: July 2 – September 14, 2011

Season chronology
- ← Previous; Season 12 Next → Season 14

Big Brother 13 is the thirteenth season of the American reality television series Big Brother. The season premiered on July 7, 2011, broadcast on CBS, and ended with a 90-minute season finale on September 14, 2011, after 75 days of competition. Julie Chen returned as host. Season 12 HouseGuest Rachel Reilly was crowned the winner, defeating Porsche Briggs in a 4-3 jury vote. For the second time, Jeff Schroeder, from Big Brother 11, was voted as the season's America's Favorite HouseGuest.

== Format ==
The format remained largely unchanged from previous seasons. HouseGuests were sequestered in the Big Brother House with no contact to or from the outside world. Each week, the HouseGuests took part in several compulsory challenges that determine who will win food, luxuries, and power in the House. The winner of the weekly Head of Household competition was immune from nominations and nominated two fellow HouseGuests for eviction. After a HouseGuest became Head of Household, he or she was ineligible to take part in the next Head of Household competition. HouseGuests also took part in Have vs. Have-Not competitions in which they were divided into either the "Haves" or the "Have Nots" depending on their performance in the competitions. HouseGuests that become "Have Nots" for the week had to eat "Big Brother slop" and a weekly food restriction (chosen by the viewing public), take cold showers, and sleep on uncomfortable beds in a room with constant fluorescent lighting. The winner of the Power of Veto competition won the right to save one of the nominated HouseGuests from eviction. If the Veto winner exercised the power, the Head of Household then nominated another HouseGuest for eviction.

On eviction night, all HouseGuests except for the Head of Household and the two nominees voted to evict one of the two nominees. This compulsory vote was conducted in the privacy of the Diary Room by the host Julie Chen. In the event of a tie, the Head of Household cast the deciding vote, announcing it in front of the other HouseGuests. Unlike other versions of Big Brother, the HouseGuests may discuss the nomination and eviction process openly and freely. The nominee with the greater number of votes will be evicted from the House on the live Thursday broadcast, exiting to an adjacent studio to be interviewed by Chen. HouseGuests may voluntarily leave the House at any time and those who break the rules may be expelled from the house by Big Brother. The final seven HouseGuests evicted during the season will vote for the winner on the season finale. These "Jury Members" will be sequestered in a separate house and will not be allowed to watch the show except for competitions and ceremonies that include all of the remaining HouseGuests. The jury members will not be shown any Diary Room interviews or any footage that may include strategy or details regarding nominations.

Some changes from previous seasons were implemented until only ten HouseGuests remained in the House. The first change was the HouseGuests pairing up into seven teams of two. The eight new HouseGuests were allowed to get to know one another and form duos as they saw fit. The six returning veteran HouseGuests were already paired up prior to entering the House. The second change was when a HouseGuest won the weekly Head of Household competition their respective partner received immunity from eviction as well. The Head of Household nominated a pair for eviction rather than two individual HouseGuests. The third change was the introduction of the "Big Brother Golden Key" which was given to the remaining member of the nominated pair that survived an eviction vote or lost a partner due to an expulsion or voluntary exit. The Big Brother Golden Key guaranteed this HouseGuest a spot in the top ten and immunity from all challenges and eviction. However, the recipients of the Golden Key were still required to vote to evict during the live eviction shows.

== HouseGuests ==
The cast of the thirteenth season of Big Brother. Top: Jordan, Shelly and Rachel Middle: Jeff, Keith, Adam, Brendon, Daniele, Dominic, Cassi, and Dick Bottom: Kalia, Porsche and Lawon

As part of the twist for the season, a selection of former HouseGuests, called "Dynamic Duos" by the producers, re-entered the House for another chance to win the grand prize. The six HouseGuests that returned were Dick Donato and Daniele Donato from Big Brother 8, Jordan Lloyd and Jeff Schroeder from Big Brother 11, and Rachel Reilly and Brendon Villegas from Big Brother 12.

Name	Age	Occupation	Residence	Day entered	Result
Rachel Reilly Big Brother 12	26	Event hostess	Las Vegas, Nevada	1	Winner; Day 75
Porsche Briggs	23	Cocktail waitress	Miami Beach, Florida	1	Runner-up; Day 75
Adam Poch	39	Music inventory manager	Hoboken, New Jersey	1	Evicted; Day 75
Jordan Lloyd Big Brother 11	24	Receptionist	Matthews, North Carolina	1	Evicted; Day 69
Kalia Booker	30	Writer	Los Angeles, California	1	Evicted; Day 67
Shelly Moore	41	Outdoor industry executive	Prairieville, Louisiana	1	Evicted; Day 62
Jeff Schroeder Big Brother 11	33	Advertising salesman	Norridge, Illinois	1	Evicted; Day 55
Daniele Donato Big Brother 8	24	College student	Huntington Beach, California	1	Evicted; Day 55
Brendon Villegas Big Brother 12	31	PhD student	Riverside, California	41	Evicted; Day 48
Brendon Villegas Big Brother 12	31	PhD student	Riverside, California	1	Evicted; Day 34
Lawon Exum	39	Legal file clerk	Inglewood, California	1	Evicted; Day 41
Dominic Briones	25	College student & Model	San Mateo, California	1	Evicted; Day 27
Cassi Colvin	26	Model	Nashville, Tennessee	1	Evicted; Day 20
Keith Henderson	32	Human resources manager	Bolingbrook, Illinois	1	Evicted; Day 13
Dick Donato Big Brother 8	48	Website CEO	Los Angeles, California	1	Quit; Day 6

=== Future appearances ===
Brendon Villegas and Rachel Reilly competed on The Amazing Race 20, and later returned for The Amazing Race 24. Reilly returned on The Amazing Race 31 along with her sister, Elissa Slater. Reilly also made guest appearances on Big Brother 20 to host a Veto competition. In 2018, Reilly and Villegas participated in Celebrity Fear Factor. In 2022, Reilly competed on the USA Network reality competition series, Snake in the Grass. In 2023, Reilly competed on the first season of the Peacock reality TV series The Traitors. In 2025, Reilly competed on Food Network's TV series Worst Cooks in America Celebrity Edition: Heroes vs. Villains.

Daniele Donato later appeared on Big Brother 20 to celebrate the engagement of Big Brother 18 contestants Nicole Franzel (the winner of that season) and Victor Arroyo. In 2020, Donato returned for a third time to compete on Big Brother: All-Stars. In 2025, Rachel Reilly returned for a 3rd time on Big Brother 27.

== Summary ==
On Day 1, the new eight HouseGuests entered the house. Following introductions, the HouseGuests learned that they would be required to select a partner to compete with in the game. Though they would be competing as individuals, it was revealed that if a HouseGuest's partner won Head of Household, then they would be immune from eviction that week. They also learned, however, that rather than nominating two HouseGuests for eviction, they would nominate one duo for eviction. When picking partners, Keith and Porsche chose to be partners, as did Cassi and Shelly. Adam and Dominic then chose to be partners, leaving Kalia and Lawon as the fourth pair. Following this, the HouseGuests learned that three former duos would be joining them. This led to the original HouseGuests all forming an alliance with the goal of evicting the returning players. HouseGuests Brendon Villegas and Rachel Reilly from season 12, Jeff Schroeder and Jordan Lloyd from seson 11, and Dick Donato and his daughter Daniele from season 8 entered the house later that night. Like the new HouseGuests, the six returning duos were partnered together and would earn immunity should their partner win Head of Household. HouseGuests then competed in the "Going Bananas" endurance Head of Household competition. For this competition, HouseGuests held onto an oversized banana while being shot with chocolate and whipped cream; the last HouseGuest remaining on their banana would be the winner. Rachel was the winner. Upon returning inside, the HouseGuests learned of the "Golden Key", in which the HouseGuest who survives eviction would earn the Golden Key, ensuring them safety until only ten HouseGuests remain. The holder of a Golden Key could not compete for Head of Household or the Power of Veto, but were still required to vote for eviction. The returning HouseGuests quickly realized that the new HouseGuests had aligned, thus leading to the six of them forming the Veterans alliance.

Realizing that the new HouseGuests would be nominated for eviction, Cassi, Dominic, Keith, and Lawon formed "The Regulators" alliance, which featured one member from each of the four new duos. Meanwhile, the returning players realized they needed to get some of the new HouseGuests on their side, leading to Dick making a deal with Porsche in which she would work with the returning players. Porsche later informed her partner Keith about this plan, and attempted to get him on board with the plan; Keith later told his Regulators alliance about this, leading to them deciding to target Porsche. On Day 4, HouseGuests competed in the "One Small Step for Cows, One Giant Leap for Milk Kind" Have-Not competition. For this competition, HouseGuests split into three teams and were required to jump into a crater of milk to allow their fellow team members to squeeze it out of them; the first two teams to fill up six jugs would be the winners, while the last team would be the Have-Nots for the week. The team of Cassi, Kalia, Lawon, and Shelly were the Have-Nots for the week. The Veterans alliance later decided they wanted Porsche to receive a Golden Key in an attempt to gain her vote for future evictions. On Day 5, Rachel chose to nominate Keith and Porsche for eviction. On Day 6, Dick chose to walk from the game due to an urgent personal matter. He later revealed in an interview with People that when the producers called him into the Diary Room on Day 6, though the preliminary tests were inconclusive, they informed him there was a possibility that he was HIV-positive; this was later found to be the case. Due to his decision, Daniele received the first Golden Key. The game continued as normal, with Rachel's nominations remaining intact. When picking players for the Power of Veto competition, Jeff and Jordan were selected to compete; Adam was selected to host. On Day 7, HouseGuests competed in the "Faster Than a Speeding Veto" Power of Veto competition. For this competition, one member of the pair lifted their partner into the air by a zipline, with this HouseGuest attempting to solve a puzzle while suspended in the air; the first duo to complete their puzzle would win the Power of Veto. Brendon and Rachel were the winners of the Power of Veto. On Day 9, Brendon and Rachel chose not to use the Power of Veto on the nominated duo. Both Keith and Porsche believed they had the votes to stay, with Keith not realizing that Kalia and Shelly had made deals with the Veterans alliance to save themselves. On Day 13, Keith became the first HouseGuest to be evicted from the house in a vote of six to four; as she lost her partner, Porsche received the second Golden Key of the season.

Following Keith's eviction, HouseGuests competed in "The Big Brother Open" Head of Household competition. For this competition, HouseGuests were required to make a single putt with a golf club in an attempt to make their golf ball land closest to the "hole-in-one", with the HouseGuest coming closest being the winner. Jordan was the winner. Though Brendon, Daniele, Porsche, and Rachel hoped to see Cassi evicted, Jordan didn't want to nominate Cassi, preferring to nominate Adam and Dominic. On Day 14, HouseGuests competed in the "March of the Ants" Have-Not competition. For this competition, each duo wore a single ant costume and were required to crawl through a picnic-themed obstacle course in an attempt to bring food crumbs to their ant hole; the first duo to complete the challenge would select two duos to be the Have-Nots for the week. Brendon and Rachel were the winners, and chose Adam, Cassi, Dominic, and Shelly to be the Have-Nots for the week. Later that day, Jordan chose to nominate Adam and Dominic for eviction. When picking players for the Power of Veto competition, Brendon and Rachel were selected to compete; Daniele was selected to host. Brendon and Rachel, upset with Jordan's nominations, later decided they would use the Power of Veto to remove Adam and Dominic from the block should they win. On Day 15, HouseGuests competed in the "Big Brother Candystore" Power of Veto competition. For this competition, HouseGuests took one piece of chewing gum and were required to walk across a balance beam to form the Veto symbol out of their chewed gum; the first HouseGuest to finish making their Veto symbol would win the Power of Veto. Dominic was the winner of the Power of Veto. Following a comment made by Rachel during the Power of Veto competition, Jeff and Jordan debated nominating Brendon and Rachel for eviction; they later decided it was too early in the game to do so. On Day 17, Dominic chose to use the Power of Veto to remove both himself and Adam from the block, with Cassi and Shelly being nominated in their place. On Day 20, Cassi became the second HouseGuest to be evicted from the house in a unanimous vote of nine to zero.

Following Cassi's eviction, HouseGuests competed in the "Big Brother Online" Head of Household competition. For this competition, HouseGuests were required to answer questions based on how they believed the viewers had responded to them; an incorrect answer resulted in elimination, and the last HouseGuest remaining was the winner. Rachel was the winner. On Day 21, HouseGuests competed in the "Same Name" luxury competition. For this competition, HouseGuests were given hints and were required to guess which celebrity was described by the hints. David Hasselhoff, who was the correct answer, later entered the house and announced that the winner would earn the right to watch an episode of the television series Same Name. Jordan was the winner, and chose Jeff, Kalia, and Shelly to watch the episode with her. This decision greatly upset Rachel and Brendon, who felt that Jordan should have selected them. Brendon and Rachel later formed an alliance with Daniele and Dominic, and the four agreed to evict Jeff and Jordan. Later that day, Rachel chose to nominate Adam and Dominic for eviction, with the hopes of backdooring Jeff and Jordan. Following this, Daniele began to urge Rachel to backdoor Jeff and Jordan, however, they later began to become suspicious of her motives. When picking players for the Power of Veto competition, Jeff and Jordan were selected to compete; Porsche was selected to host. On Day 22, HouseGuests competed in the "Hot Legs" Power of Veto competition. For this competition, HouseGuests had to pull various "hairs" out from a model leg, with various letters written on each of them. The HouseGuests would collect hairs and attempt to spell a word with their collected letters; the HouseGuest with the longest correctly spelled word would win the Power of Veto. Brendon was the winner of the Power of Veto. When Dominic told Shelly about the plan to backdoor Jeff, Shelly informed Jeff and Jordan which led to them, Brendon, and Rachel turning against Daniele. On Day 24, Brendon chose not to use the Power of Veto on either nominee. The HouseGuests later held a house meeting in which Daniele was called out for her plan to backdoor Jeff, leading to many arguments between Brendon, Daniele, Dominic, Jeff, Jordan, Kalia, Lawon, and Rachel. On Day 27, Dominic became the third HouseGuest to be evicted from the house in a vote of seven to one.

Following Dominic's eviction, it was confirmed that the Golden Key twist was officially over, meaning all HouseGuests were competing in the Head of Household competition excluding Rachel. HouseGuests then competed in the "Big Brother Slalom" endurance Head of Household competition. For this competition, HouseGuests stood on a pair of skis that moved from side to side with the goal of being the last one remaining; the last HouseGuest remaining on their skis would be the winner. Daniele was the winner. During the competition, Brendon, Jordan, and Lawon became the Have-Nots for the week. Daniele soon decided she wanted to target Brendon and Rachel for eviction, and later made a deal to keep Jeff and Jordan safe in exchange for safety the following week. Brendon and Rachel later attempted to make a deal with Daniele, and attempted to get the Veterans alliance back together. On Day 28, Daniele chose to nominate Brendon and Rachel for eviction. When picking players for the Power of Veto competition, Adam, Jeff, and Porsche were selected to compete; Lawon was selected to host. On Day 29, HouseGuests competed in the "Time's Up" Power of Veto competition. For this competition, HouseGuests were required to write down how quickly they could complete a task similar to previous competitions, and the HouseGuest with the lowest time would be required to complete the task in the given time; if they succeeded, they remained in the game, while failure led to elimination. Brendon was the winner. Though Brendon continued to tell the HouseGuests that he would be using the Power of Veto on himself, he and Rachel secretly decided that he would use it to save Rachel. On Day 31, Brendon chose to use the Power of Veto to remove Rachel from the block, with Jordan being nominated in her place. On Day 34, Brendon became the fourth HouseGuest to be evicted from the house in a vote of five to two.

Following Brendon's eviction, the HouseGuests learned that the next evicted HouseGuest would have the opportunity to return to the game. Following this, HouseGuests competed in the "Check Mate" Head of Household competition. For this competition, HouseGuests faced off two at a time and were asked questions about the previously evicted HouseGuests; the winner of each round would select the next two HouseGuests to face off, with the last HouseGuest remaining being the winner. Kalia was the winner.

The next day the Have/Have-Not competition involved mixing three ingredients and having a member of the opposing team guess the drink ingredient; if there was a tie, the contestant who drank the fastest would receive a point for their team. Jeff, Jordan, Rachel, and Shelly lost and became the Have-Nots for the week. The public voted for the Have-Nots to have coconuts and catfish in addition to slop. Later that evening Rachel and Jeff were nominated for eviction by Kalia. The following day Jeff won the Power of Veto competition, Big Brother Odyssey, by being the first HouseGuest to roll a ball back and forth with the first person to reach 300 points declared the winner. Jeff saved himself from eviction on Day 37 and Kalia nominated Lawon for eviction after he volunteered to become the nominee. Lawon was evicted on Day 41 by a unanimous vote. In an unprecedented move, he volunteered to be evicted thinking the upcoming twist would return him to the House.

After the eviction results were announced the HouseGuests were informed of the full twist. Meanwhile, Keith, Cassi, Dominic and Brendon re-entered the House through the backyard to find out which one of the four would compete to regain HouseGuest status. Brendon was chosen to return to the House after receiving 39.5% of the public vote for a chance to return. Keith, Cassi and Dominic then exited the House. Brendon and Lawon then competed in the competition That's How We Roll. The object was to be the first person to create a complete set of fourteen multi-colored balls, each one named for one of the fourteen original HouseGuests. The player with the complete set in the fastest locked time would regain HouseGuest status. If neither player finished a complete set, the person who successfully shot the first ball would automatically win. At the start of the battle Big Brother released one hundred and fifty balls into the backyard. Brendon shot a complete set at about 2:40 and regained HouseGuest status on Day 41.

Later that evening Daniele won her second Head of Household competition, Count on America. Shelly and Adam were nominated for eviction the next day by Daniele. Adam won the Power of Veto competition, Big Brother Cornhole, on Day 43 and saved himself from eviction on Day 46. During the competition, HouseGuests competing won a variety of prizes including, a Caribbean Vacation for Kalia, $5,000 for Jeff, a Veto ticket for Daniele ensuring her a spot in next week's Veto competition, 24-hour solitary confinement for Shelly with the privilege of receiving a phone call from home, and a "humilitard" to be worn by Jordan for a week. Daniele then nominated Brendon for eviction alongside Shelly. After a 5–1 vote in Shelly's favor, Brendon was once again evicted from the house and became the first Jury member.

Following Brendon's eviction, the remaining eligible HouseGuests competed in the game, All Washed Up. HouseGuests had to retrieve a ping-pong ball from within a container, by using a small cup to transfer Liquid Detergent across the yard while on a slippery surface. Jeff was the first to do so, and became the new Head of Household. Unbeknownst to the HouseGuests, Julie Chen announced to the viewers that Day 55 of the competition will be a Double Eviction night. Jeff nominated Porsche and Kalia for eviction. However, after he also won Power of Veto he removed Porsche from the block and replaced her with Daniele. On Day 55, Daniele was evicted on a 3–2 vote, becoming the second Jury member. However, the HouseGuests were informed on eviction night that it was Big Brother Fast Forward, with a Head of Household competition, nomination ceremony, Veto competition and ceremony, and eviction vote all occurring on the same day. Kalia won the Head of Household competition Before or After and nominated Rachel and Jeff. Porsche won the Power of Veto in a competition called Clowning Around, and chose not to use it. As a result of a tie in the eviction votes, Kalia, as HoH, voted to evict Jeff, making him the seventh evicted housemate of the season, the eighth evictee, and the third member of the Jury.

Following Danielle and Jeff's eviction, Porsche won Week 8's HoH competition, Snake-Eyes, and nominated the two remaining veterans, Jordan and Rachel, for eviction. As HoH, Porsche decided to open Pandora's Box (PB), and was awarded $10,000 that she had to split with one other player. She chose Kalia. The other part of Pandora's Box was the return of the Duo Twist for Week 8 only. Porsche chose Kalia, Rachel chose Jordan, and Adam chose Shelly. Rachel won the Duo Do Over PoV competition, and removed Jordan and herself from the block. Porsche was left with one alternative duo – Adam & Shelly. Shelly was evicted by a 2–1 vote, making her the fourth member of the Jury, and the first newbie on the Jury.

Following Shelly's eviction, The HouseGuest then competed in Week 9's HoH competition, Rollin' in the Dough, was won by Rachel. A Pandora's Box twist was offered to Rachel which led to Tori Spelling entering the house on Day 64. Kalia and Porsche were nominated for eviction. Adam won Power of Veto and let the nominations stand. As part of a second Double Eviction week, Kalia was evicted by 2–1 vote, with HoH Rachel casting the tie-breaking vote after Jordan voted to evict Porsche and Adam voted to evict Kalia. Kalia became the fifth Jury member, and the second newbie on the Jury. The HouseGuest then competed in the second HoH competition of the week, Big Brother Fortune Teller, was won by Adam on Day 68. He nominated Porsche and Jordan for eviction. The HouseGuests played a veto competition, Big Brother Jukebox, which Porsche won. At the live veto ceremony, Porsche removed herself from the block. Rachel replaced her as the only possible alternative nominee. Immediately, Porsche cast the sole vote to evict Jordan who became the sixth member of the jury and the fourth veteran.

Following Kalia and Jordan's eviction, Week 10's HoH competition had three parts. The final three HouseGuests began playing Big Brother Mixer to determine the winner of the first part. Adam was eliminated after 29 minutes. Rachel won when Porsche fell after 48 minutes into the competition. Porsche and Adam competed in the second part, an underwater challenge, which Porsche ultimately won. Rachel and Porsche competed in the third part of the HoH competition which Rachel won and became the Final HoH. She evicted Adam, who became the seventh and final member of the jury. By a jury vote of 4–3 Rachel won the $500,000 grand prize. She gained Brendon, Jeff, Jordan, and Shelly's vote while Adam, Daniele, and Kalia voted for Porsche. Porsche placed second and won the $50,000 runner-up prize. Jeff won $25,000 after being voted America's favorite player on the CBS website.

== Episodes ==
No. overall	No. in season	Title	Original release date
411	1	"Episode 1"	July 7, 2011
412	2	"Episode 2"	July 10, 2011
413	3	"Episode 3"	July 13, 2011
414	4	"Episode 4"	July 14, 2011
415	5	"Episode 5"	July 17, 2011
416	6	"Episode 6"	July 20, 2011
417	7	"Episode 7"	July 21, 2011
418	8	"Episode 8"	July 24, 2011
419	9	"Episode 9"	July 27, 2011
420	10	"Episode 10"	July 28, 2011
421	11	"Episode 11"	July 31, 2011
422	12	"Episode 12"	August 3, 2011
423	13	"Episode 13"	August 4, 2011
424	14	"Episode 14"	August 7, 2011
425	15	"Episode 15"	August 10, 2011
426	16	"Episode 16"	August 11, 2011
427	17	"Episode 17"	August 14, 2011
428	18	"Episode 18"	August 17, 2011
429	19	"Episode 19"	August 18, 2011
430	20	"Episode 20"	August 21, 2011
431	21	"Episode 21"	August 24, 2011
432	22	"Episode 22"	August 25, 2011
433	23	"Episode 23"	August 28, 2011
434	24	"Episode 24"	August 31, 2011
435	25	"Episode 25"	September 1, 2011
436	26	"Episode 26"	September 4, 2011
437	27	"Episode 27"	September 7, 2011
438	28	"Episode 28"	September 8, 2011
439	29	"Episode 29"	September 14, 2011

== Voting history ==
Color key:

Winner
Runner-up
Head of Household
Nominated for eviction
Immune from eviction
Team immunity
Evicted
Quit
Re-entered the game

Voting history (season 13)
	Duos phase			Individual phase					Duos phase	Individual phase			
	Week 1	Week 2	Week 3	Week 4	Week 5	Week 6	Week 7		Week 8	Week 9		Week 10	
	Week 1	Week 2	Week 3	Week 4	Week 5	Week 6	Day 49	Day 55 (Note: This week was a double eviction week. Following the first eviction, the remaining HouseGuests played a week's worth of games – including Head of Household and veto competitions; and nomination, veto, and eviction ceremonies – during the live show, culminating in a second eviction for the week.)	Week 8	Day 63	Day 68	Day 75	Finale
Head of Household	Rachel	Jordan	Rachel	Daniele	Kalia	Daniele	Jeff	Kalia	Porsche	Rachel	Adam	Rachel	(None)
Nominations (initial)	Keith; Porsche	Adam; Dominic	Adam; Dominic	Brendon; Rachel	Jeff; Rachel	Adam; Shelly	Kalia; Porsche	Jeff; Rachel	Jordan; Rachel	Kalia; Porsche	Jordan; Porsche	(None)	(None)
Veto winner(s)	Brendon; Rachel	Dominic	Brendon	Brendon	Jeff	Adam	Jeff	Porsche	Rachel	Adam	Porsche	(None)	(None)
Nominations (final)	Keith; Porsche	Cassi; Shelly	Adam; Dominic	Brendon; Jordan	Lawon; Rachel	Brendon; Shelly	Daniele; Kalia	Jeff; Rachel	Adam; Shelly	Kalia; Porsche	Jordan; Rachel	Adam; Porsche	(None)
Rachel	Head of Household	Cassi	Head of Household	Jordan	Nominated	Shelly	Daniele	Nominated	Shelly	Kalia (Note: As the vote was tied, the Head of Household cast the tie-breaker vote.)	Nominated	Adam (Note: As Head of Household, Rachel chose to evict Adam.)	Winner
Porsche	Nominated	Cassi (Note: This player was awarded a golden key because their partner was voted out, and was thus immune from being nominated for eviction through week 3.)	Dominic	Jordan	Lawon	Brendon	Kalia	Jeff	Head of Household	Nominated	Jordan	Nominated	Runner-up
Adam	Porsche	Cassi	Nominated	Brendon	Lawon	Brendon	Daniele	Rachel	Nominated	Kalia	Head of Household	Evicted (Day 75)	Porsche
Jordan	Keith	Head of Household	Dominic	Nominated	Lawon	Brendon	Daniele	Rachel	Shelly	Porsche	Nominated	Evicted (Day 69)	Rachel
Kalia	Keith	Cassi	Dominic	Brendon	Head of Household	Brendon	Nominated	Jeff	Adam (Note: This player was granted immunity from being nominated for eviction because their partner was Head of Household.)	Nominated	Evicted (Day 67)		Porsche
Shelly	Keith	Nominated	Dominic	Brendon	Lawon	Nominated	Kalia	Jeff	Nominated	Evicted (Day 62)			Rachel
Jeff	Keith	Cassi	Dominic	Brendon	Lawon	Brendon	Head of Household	Nominated	Evicted (Day 55)				Rachel
Daniele	Keith (Note: Daniele was awarded a golden key after Dick quit the game, and was thus immune from being nominated for eviction through week 3.)	Cassi	Adam	Head of Household	Lawon	Head of Household	Nominated	Evicted (Day 55)					Porsche
Brendon	Keith	Cassi	Dominic	Nominated	Evicted (Day 34)	Nominated	Re-evicted (Day 48)						Rachel
Lawon	Porsche	Cassi	Dominic	Brendon	Nominated	Evicted (Day 41)							
Dominic	Porsche	Cassi	Nominated	Evicted (Day 27)									
Cassi	Porsche	Nominated	Evicted (Day 20)										
Keith	Nominated	Evicted (Day 13)											
Dick	Quit (Day 6)												
Evicted	Keith; 6 of 10 votes to evict	Cassi; 9 of 9 votes to evict	Dominic; 7 of 8 votes to evict	Brendon; 5 of 7 votes to evict	Lawon; 6 of 6 votes to evict	Brendon; Won re-entry into game (Note: The audience had the chance to decide whether Keith, Cassi, Dominic, or Brendon would be given a chance to re-enter to the house. The audience chose Brendon, so after Lawon's eviction on Day 41, Brendon and Lawon battled to re-enter the House, and Brendon won.)	Daniele; 3 of 5 votes to evict	Jeff; 3 of 5 votes to evict	Shelly; 2 of 3 votes to evict	Kalia; 2 of 3 votes to evict	Jordan; Porsche's choice to evict	Adam; Rachel's choice to evict	Rachel; 4 votes to win
Evicted	Keith; 6 of 10 votes to evict	Cassi; 9 of 9 votes to evict	Dominic; 7 of 8 votes to evict	Brendon; 5 of 7 votes to evict	Lawon; 6 of 6 votes to evict	Brendon; 5 of 6 votes to evict	Daniele; 3 of 5 votes to evict	Jeff; 3 of 5 votes to evict	Shelly; 2 of 3 votes to evict	Kalia; 2 of 3 votes to evict	Jordan; Porsche's choice to evict	Adam; Rachel's choice to evict	Porsche; 3 votes to win

== Production ==
=== Development ===
Big Brother 13 was produced by Endemol USA and Fly on the Wall Entertainment, with Allison Grodner and Rich Meehan returning as executive producers. This season of the program was announced on September 15, 2010, before the season finale of Big Brother 12 was transmitted, due to significant increases in the ratings over Big Brother 11. Casting for season began in mid-April with applications and video tape submissions that did not have a set deadline. Applicants chosen to be a finalist went to Los Angeles, from which applicants were narrowed down to a pool of 40 finalists. Robyn Kass, casting director for Big Brother, revealed on her Twitter account on June 8, 2011, that the semi-finalist were contacted while no final decision on who would be selected for the program had been made. The selected group of HouseGuests were put into sequester on June 25, 2011, and interviewed by the media with their identities revealed on Yahoo TV on the morning of June 30, 2011. The 8 original cast members entered the house on July 2, 2011, as did the 6 returning players a few hours later. Nine HouseGuests new to Big Brother were revealed on June 30 through Yahoo! and WeLoveBigBrother, a fan site which was able to interview the HouseGuests. Jason Thomas, a 26-year-old boxing promoter, was dropped from the list of HouseGuests due to "a casting decision" that trimmed the number of new HouseGuests this season down to eight.

=== Broadcast ===
Big Brother 13 was broadcast on CBS from July 7, 2011, to September 14, 2011. This season lasted a total of 75 days, the same amount as the previous season. This season featured no changes to the schedule that was used in the previous edition, with episodes airing on Wednesday, Thursday, and Sunday each week. The Thursday episode, which aired at 9 pm Eastern Time, featured the live eviction and subsequent Head of Household competition taking place. During the live eviction, the show was hosted by Julie Chen. The Sunday episode, which aired at 8 pm Eastern Time, featured the food competition and nomination ceremony, as well as some highlights from the previous days. The Wednesday episode, which aired at 8 pm Eastern Time, featured the Power of Veto competition and the Power of Veto ceremony, along with more highlights of recent events in the game. Some changes to the scheduling format were made. The series was broadcast on Global Television Network in Canada.

Much like the previous editions, the live feeds were also available again for this season. HouseGuests enter the house a few days before the premiere, and the feeds are not live for the first few days. They later go live after the broadcast of the launch episode. This season did see the return of the Big Brother: After Dark spin-off series, which aired on Showtime Too nightly from midnight to 3 a.m. Eastern Time. The show served as a live feed into the house, and was edited only for slanderous statements and music copyrights. Much like the previous season, Big Brother 13 is available for digital purchasing on iTunes and Amazon.com. Big Brother maintained an online platform with live subscription feeds from RealNetworks, a redesigned and relaunched website, online videos, full episodes, a fantasy game and segments on Inside Dish with Ross Mathews. Big Brother also maintained two Twitter accounts; one featured updates from the production staff and one featured updates from the current Head of Household. Episodes of Big Brother continued to be streamed on CBS Mobile Channel on FLOTV. Mobile users were also able to interact and influence the show through SMS text messaging and a simulation game based on Big Brother was also available to mobile customers. Other features included a video trivia game and the "Big Brother Ultimate Fan" contest where the winner was able to attend the season finale meet the HouseGuests.

=== House ===
As with each season since Big Brother 6, the program was filmed at CBS Studios in Studio City, California. The production team was located in the second story of the House which included the story department, audio department and the switchers and shaders. The house was equipped with 52 cameras and 95 microphones to record the participants. The art department that created the competitions for the program was located outside the house. The house theme was the Venice Beach. The living room featured yellow and black colored furniture, while the walls were brick. The room that had featured a lounge, referred to as the "Parlor", now featured a fortune teller alongside the lounge area. The bathroom in the house was colored in white, yellow, and brown, while the yellow railing featured by the stairs leading to the Head of Household room remains along with a newly added gate. There are various bikes around the kitchen ceiling and the balcony at the Head of Household bedroom. The house included four bedrooms each varying in design and comfort. The Head of Household bedroom featured blue and white colors while the second bedroom was designed to feature Summer qualities, with components such as an ice cream truck being featured. The third room initially used by the HouseGuests was later turned into the Have-Not room, which was designed to look like an insane asylum.

=== Prizes ===
The 14 HouseGuests this season were competing for the main prize of $500,000. The winner of the series, determined by the previously evicted HouseGuests, would win the $500,000 prize, while the Runner-up would receive a $50,000 prize. Other than the main prize, various luxuries and prizes were given out throughout the season. The finale also have a prize of $25,000 awarded for the American Favorite HouseGuest which is determined by the public vote, eligible to any HouseGuest except for Dick Donato (due to his withdrawal).

== Reception ==
=== Critical responses ===
==== Jeff Schroeder ====
After the season premiere, Jeff Schroeder made several controversial comments regarding the sexual orientation of the fictional character Albus Dumbledore from the Harry Potter series on July 12, 2011 (which was Day 10 inside the house). Jeff didn't think it was appropriate to have a gay headmaster locked away with children in a magical land. When fellow House Guest Kalia Booker challenged Jeff on making this statement, saying there was nothing wrong with teachers that identify as gay, Jeff rejected her viewpoint and accused her of being politically correct for the audience.

The conversation was posted online but was shortly removed by RealNetworks under the grounds of copyright and infringement. A couple of websites later posted full transcripts of the argument online shortly after. CBS released a public statement the following day regarding Jeff's comment, stating that any views or opinions expressed by the HouseGuests are those of the individual and not the network or producers of the program.

The Gay & Lesbian Alliance Against Defamation (GLAAD) responded to the controversy by referring to Jeff as an "openly anti-gay reality star". After recounting the various programs he has taken part of (a contestant in The Amazing Race, host of the second season of Around the World for Free web series and two seasons of Big Brother), GLAAD alleged that the network knew Jeff would bring his "openly anti-gay attitudes" back to the program and questioned if the network had cast him for that purpose.

After Jeff was evicted in a double eviction week on Day 55, Shelly Moore received heavy criticism from the show's fans, who held her responsible for his eviction. Her family later received phone calls that contained violent threats, including some aimed at her 8-year-old daughter, while her employer has also received phone calls calling for her termination. Allison Grodner, the executive producer of Big Brother, posted a message on her Twitter account regarding the incidents.

==== Alleged rigging from production ====
During Week 8, a controversial Pandora's Box twist left fans wondering if production was fixing the game for certain players. As Head of Household for the week, Porsche Briggs openly identified her targets as the last two returning HouseGuests, Jordan Lloyd and Rachel Reilly. But when Porsche opened Pandora's Box, she unleashed the return of the duos twist, making Rachel and Jordan a duo. Only one of them needed to win the Power of Veto to keep both of them safe from eviction. Fans suspected that the return of the duos twist was a ploy by production to keep both women in the game, as the remaining HouseGuests had made a contingency plan to vote out whichever veteran did not win the Power of Veto. These suspicions heightened after the Power of Veto competition was a redux of an earlier competition that Reilly had won. Houseguest Kalia Booker suspected that the competition had not been properly tested, suggesting it had been thrown together at the last minute. Rachel won the veto competition, saving herself and Jordan while forcing Porsche to nominate Adam Poch and Shelly Moore by default, as they were the only pair left for Porsche to put on the block. Rachel went on to win the season while Porsche finished in 2nd place, and Jordan finished in 4th.

=== Viewing figures ===
"Rating" is the estimated percentage of all televisions tuned to the show, and "share" is the percentage of all televisions in use that are tuned in. "Viewers" is the estimated number of viewers that watched a program either while it was broadcast or watched via DVR on the same day the program was broadcast. This is the most successful season of Big Brother since 2004, Big Brother 5. It has won every time slot in viewers and key demographics facing non-sports programming.

Key
†	Season high for that night of the week

#	Air Date	United States					Canada		Source
#	Air Date	18–34 (rating/share)	18–49 (rating/share)	Viewers (millions)	Rank (timeslot)	Rank (night)	18–49 (viewers)	Viewers (millions)	Source
1	Thursday, July 7	2.3/8	2.8/8	7.89	1	1	878,000	1.70	
2	Sunday, July 10	2.0/7	2.5/8	7.18	1	3	N/A	N/A	
3	Wednesday, July 13	2.1/8	2.6/9	7.31	1	2	N/A	N/A	
4	Thursday, July 14	1.9/7	2.3/7	6.61	1	1	N/A	N/A	
5	Sunday, July 17	1.9/7	2.4/7	6.92	1	1	N/A	N/A	
6	Wednesday, July 20	2.1/8	2.6/9	7.16	1	2	N/A	N/A	
7	Thursday, July 21	2.1/7	2.6/8	6.90	1	1	N/A	N/A	
8	Sunday, July 24	2.1/8	2.5/8	7.03	1	1	N/A	N/A	
9	Wednesday, July 27	2.0/7	2.4/8	6.84	1	2	N/A	N/A	
10	Thursday, July 28	2.1/7	2.6/8	7.12	1	1	N/A	N/A	
11	Sunday, July 31	2.3/8	2.8/9	8.17	1	1	N/A	N/A	
12	Wednesday, August 3	1.8/7	2.5/8	6.90	1	1	N/A	N/A	
13	Thursday, August 4	2.2/8	2.8/8	7.43	1	1	N/A	N/A	
14	Sunday, August 7	2.2/8	2.9/10	7.84	1	1	N/A	N/A	
15	Wednesday, August 10	2.3/9	2.8/9	7.69	1	1	N/A	N/A	
16	Thursday, August 11	2.3/7	2.7/8	7.12	1	1	N/A	N/A	
17	Sunday, August 14	2.0/6	2.7/7	7.60	1	1	N/A	N/A	
18	Wednesday, August 17	2.6/10	3.1/10	8.14	1	1	N/A	N/A	
19	Thursday, August 18	2.5/8	2.9/8	7.74	1	2	N/A	N/A	
20	Sunday, August 21	2.8/9	3.2/10	8.37 †	1	1	N/A	N/A	
21	Wednesday, August 24	2.5/9	2.9/9	7.95	1	1 (Tie)	N/A	N/A	
22	Thursday, August 25	2.5/8	3.1/9	8.15 †	1	1	N/A	N/A	
23	Sunday, August 28	2.2/7	3.0/9	7.87	1	1	N/A	N/A	
24	Wednesday, August 31	2.9/11	3.3/11	8.34 †	1	1	N/A	N/A	
25	Thursday, September 1	2.0/6	2.5/7	6.25	1	1	N/A	N/A	
26	Sunday, September 4	1.9/7	2.4/8	6.66	1	1	N/A	N/A	
27	Wednesday, September 7	2.3/9	2.9/9	7.79	1	2	N/A	N/A	
28	Thursday, September 8	N/A	2.4/6	6.65	2	3	N/A	N/A	
29	Wednesday, September 14	2.3/8	2.9/8	7.78	1	4	N/A	N/A	

- ^Note 1: Episode 25 was preempted in many regions due to football.
