= Survivor After Show =

Internet talk-show

- Also known as: Survivor Live
- Genre: Talk show
- Presented by: Richard Hatch Chris Booker; Jenna Morasca; Dalton Ross Bill Posley; Parvati Shallow; Jeff Schroeder Malcolm Freberg

Original release
- Release: September 16, 2004 – May 13, 2007
- Release: October 11, 2012 – December 18, 2014

Survivor After Show (previously branded as Survivor Live) was an internet talk show about the television series Survivor that aired exclusively on CBS.com.

== Survivor Live (2004–07) ==
The show premiered at the beginning of Survivor: Vanuatu - Islands of Fire as a result of the popularity of House Calls: The Big Brother Talk Show, which began airing the previous summer during Big Brother 5. During that season, the show was hosted by Richard Hatch, winner on Survivor: Borneo and a contestant on Survivor: All-Stars, and Chris Booker, a New York television and radio personality. The show originally aired as one-hour Thursday and Friday shows at 2 p.m. North American Eastern Time Zone, with the Thursday shows talking about the show in general, sometimes with in-studio guests or celebrities, and Friday shows involving the contestant voted out the previous night. Of note, Survivor Live ended its first season right before the season finale, meaning the show never interviewed any of the final four contestants.

The second season of Survivor Live, with the start of Survivor: Palau, was retooled, mostly due to Hatch's then-new legal troubles, with new hosts Jenna Morasca, winner of Survivor: The Amazon and a contestant on Survivor: All-Stars, and Dalton Ross, an editor of Entertainment Weekly magazine. From this season forward, the show was reduced to weekly Friday shows at 2 p.m. EST with the most recent castoff joining the two hosts in a one-hour show. Some seasons also have special features, such as Time Capsule (where the Survivor leaves a message for him/herself before the show starts), Minus 10 (where the ousted Survivor has to comment on 10 words in 10 words or less) and Jenna Morasca's Fan Question of the Week (where Jenna picks a question sent to her through her MySpace to ask the ousted Survivor). Changes to the schedule are made if the show if the TV show is on a different date, or due to holidays. The audio of this edition broadcast the following Sunday in San Francisco's KIFR-FM. The show was cancelled after the Survivor: Fiji season.

== Survivor After Show (2012–14) ==
The show returned in 2012 during the airing of Survivor: Philippines (starting with the fourth episode), under the name Survivor After Show, with Survivor: One World participant Bill Posley as host and rotating previous contestants as weekly special guests. The show aired every Thursday afternoon and features interviews with booted contestants and analysis from the special guest. In 2013, Parvati Shallow became the host of the Survivor Live After Show during the airing of Survivor: Caramoan, her premiere episode being a Valentine's Day special with fellow Survivor: Cook Islands and Survivor: Micronesia contestant Ozzy Lusth.

Shallow returned as host again for Survivor: Blood vs. Water and Survivor: Cagayan. In 2014, for Cagayan, the program changed its name back to Survivor Live.

As a result of Shallow moving to New York in 2014, former Big Brother contestant Jeff Schroeder took over as host for the show's coverage of Survivor: San Juan del Sur. During San Juan del Sur, Schroeder took a two-week leave of absence to film the fifth season of Marriage Boot Camp, and was replaced by Malcolm Freberg of Survivor: Philippines and Survivor: Caramoan. Survivor Live was not continued for Survivor: Worlds Apart in 2015.
