= Bigg Boss 12 =

Bigg Boss 12 is the twelfth season of various versions of Bigg Boss (an Indian adaptation of the reality game show Big Brother):

- Bigg Boss (Hindi TV series) season 12
- Bigg Boss Kannada season 12

== See also ==
- Big Brother 12 (disambiguation)
- Bigg Boss (disambiguation)
- Bigg Boss 11 (disambiguation)
- BB12 (disambiguation)
