= Big Brother 12 =

Big Brother 12 is the twelfth season of various versions of Big Brother and may refer to:

- Big Brother 12 (U.S.), the 2010 edition of the U.S. version
- Gran Hermano 12 (Spain), the 2010 edition of the Spanish version
- Big Brother 12 (UK), the 2011 edition of the UK version
- Grande Fratello (season 12), the 2011-2012 edition of Big Brother in Italy
- Big Brother Brasil 12, the 2012 edition of the Brazil version
- Big Brother (Australian season 12) the 2020 reboot of the Australian version
- Bigg Boss 12 (disambiguation)
  - Bigg Boss 12, twelfth season of Big Brother in India in Hindi

== See also ==
- Big Brother (franchise)
- Big Brother (disambiguation)
