= Jordan Lloyd =

American reality show contestant (born 1986)

- Born: Jordan Hailie Lloyd; November 21, 1986 (age 39); Raleigh, North Carolina, U.S.
- Education: David W. Butler High School
- Known for: Big Brother 11 (winner); The Amazing Race 16; Big Brother 13; Marriage Boot Camp; Big Brother Reindeer Games (co-host)
- Spouse: Jeff Schroeder (m. 2016)
- Children: 2

Jordan Hailie Lloyd (born November 21, 1986) is an American television personality, digital content creator and podcast host. She won the 11th season of Big Brother and later appeared on The Amazing Race 16, Big Brother 13 and Marriage Boot Camp. With her husband, Jeff Schroeder, she hosts the podcast TogetherMess and creates programming for their YouTube channel, Jeff & Jordan TV.

== Big Brother ==
=== Season 11 ===
Lloyd was chosen to be a houseguest on the eleventh season of the CBS reality show Big Brother in the summer of 2009. As part of the season's high school cliques twist, Lloyd was placed in the popular clique, alongside Braden Bacha and Laura Crosby.

In the first week, Lloyd formed a close friendship with house outsider Jeff Schroeder, leading to a long-lasting alliance between the pair. When her clique member and friend Braden was nominated for eviction, Jordan was instrumental in the attempt to save him, seemingly gathering the votes to evict Chima Simone. However, on eviction night, Ronnie Talbot betrayed the alliance, forcing a tie that caused Braden's eviction. Jordan was nominated in the following two weeks, but was spared on both occasions as she was considered less of a threat than her fellow nominees Laura and Casey - both members of her initial alliance.

Things began to turn in Jordan's favor in the fourth week of the show, when during a key Head of Household competition, Jeff struck a deal with Russell Kairouz, guaranteeing safety for himself and Jordan if he allowed Russell to win the competition. This allowed Russell to target and evict Ronnie. In the same week, Jeff won a public vote, and was secretly awarded the coup d'état – the power to overthrow a Head of Household and change the nominations. Jeff opted to use the power during Chima's Head of Household reign the week after Ronnie's Eviction, saving Russell from eviction, and condemning Jessie to the jury.

Following Jessie's eviction, the balance of power in the house firmly flipped, with the rival alliance acting angrily to Jessie's eviction, eventually resulting in Chima leaving the game. Following Chima's surprise exit, Jordan won her first competition in the impromptu Head of Household competition, with Lydia Tavera and Natalie Martinez being her choices for nominations. Jordan then proceeded to win the Power of Veto competition for the first time, and ensured Lydia's eviction by keeping the nominations the same. Jeff then became Head of Household for the first time, but after continued manipulation by Natalie and Kevin Campbell, Jeff became paranoid about Russell's true loyalties, and after winning the Veto, used it on Kevin and replacing him with Russell, who was then evicted. Kevin then proceeded to win Head of Household, choosing to nominate Jeff and Michele for eviction. Michele won the veto, and Jordan was named as the replacement nominee. Despite openly expressing her wish for Jeff to stay in the game instead of her, Jordan was spared and moved into the final four. Nominated alongside her last ally Michele, Jordan was once again spared, as Michele was seen as more likely to win the final Head of Household competition.

Now in the final three, Jordan was outnumbered 2-1 by the alliance of Kevin and Natalie, and lost the first part of the final Head of Household competition to Kevin. However, she then rebounded by surprisingly winning the final two parts, earning herself a spot in the final two. She chose to evict Kevin and take Natalie to the final with her. Faced with the jury, Jordan admitted she hadn't played as strong a strategic game as Natalie, but in the end emerged as the winner in a 5–2 vote, gaining the votes of Jeff, Michele, Lydia, Jessie and a vote from America, losing just Kevin and Russell's votes.

Jordan was well received by the audience of the show during the season, with her and Jeff being described as two of the most popular houseguests in years. At the 2009 Fox Reality Awards, the pair were given the award for "Favorite Duo".

=== Season 13 ===
Two years after her initial appearance, Jordan returned to the house for the thirteenth season of the show, again with Jeff, as part of the duos twist. In the first week, Jordan joined an alliance of the six returning players, consisting of herself and Jeff, father and daughter Dick and Daniele Donato, and fellow couple Brendon Villegas and Rachel Reilly, and following Dick's unexpected departure, was pivotal in securing the key votes of Shelly Moore and Kalia Booker in the Veteran's successful attempt to save Porsche Briggs and evict her partner, Keith Henderson. Jordan continued to prove her worth by winning the second Head of Household competition, and opted to target the popular Dominic Briones, nominating him alongside Adam Poch. However, when Dominic vetoed the pair, Jordan was forced to nominate a replacement pair, and under pressure from her alliance, she reluctantly nominated Shelly and Cassi Colvin for eviction, resulting in Cassi's unanimous eviction. After surviving eviction, Shelly pledged her loyalty to Jeff and Jordan, agreeing to go to the final three with them.

In the third week of the game, Jordan's alliance collapsed when Daniele turned on her and Jeff, trying to persuade Rachel to nominate them. They objected to her move, cementing the alliance between the two couples, but resulting in Daniele leaving the alliance when Dominic was evicted. Daniele then won the Head of Household competition and immediately targeted her former allies for eviction. However, she then backtracked on her plans to evict Jeff, and after promising Jeff and Jordan safety, instead targeted and nominated Brendon and Rachel. Brendon then won the Power of Veto and after using it on Rachel, Jordan was nominated as a pawn by Daniele. On eviction night, Jordan was spared, and Brendon was evicted by a vote of 5–2, gaining the votes of Rachel and Porsche. The following week, Kalia rose to power for the first time, but opted to keep Jordan safe throughout the week due to an earlier promise between the pair never to nominate each other. The next week, Brendon returned to the game, and Daniele again became Head of Household. Fearing Jeff would win the next Head of Household competition, Daniele tried to strike a deal with Jeff and Jordan after naming Brendon as her replacement nominee, but when Jeff did win Head of Household, and when Daniele failed to win the Power of Veto, she was named as the replacement nominee.

Despite the votes being locked to evict Daniele, Shelly began to have doubts about her alliance with Jeff and Jordan, and actively began campaigning to save Daniele, upsetting Jeff who engaged in an argument with Shelly shortly before the live show. The houseguest's learned it was Fast-Forward eviction night, and after Daniele was evicted, Kalia became the new Head of Household and nominated Jeff and Rachel for eviction. Jeff was unable to win the veto, and Shelly voted to evict Jeff, forcing a tie, which Kalia broke in Rachel's favor, resulting in Jeff's eviction. Jordan furiously declared the end of her friendship with Shelly, losing her temper in a rare moment of anger. With Porsche now in power, Rachel and Jordan felt doomed, but were given a chance of reprieve when Porsche opened Pandora's Box, re-activating the Duos twist for one week. Jordan paired up with Rachel, and despite initially being nominated as a pair, Rachel won the Veto, and used it on herself and Jordan, essentially giving them the choice of whom to evict from the two replacement nominees – Adam and Shelly. One week after Jeff's eviction, Jordan and Rachel chose to take revenge on Shelly, evicting her in a 2–1 vote. Rachel then proceeded to win the next Head of Household competition, and despite Adam having the ability to use his Veto to put Jordan in a position of certain eviction, he chose to maintain his long-standing alliance with Jordan, pushing her into the final four. Wanting to keep her early deal with nominated houseguest Kalia, Jordan voted to evict Porsche on eviction night, aware that Rachel would break the resultant tie and evict Kalia anyway. The following week, Jordan narrowly lost the power position to Adam by a single point, and lost the Veto to Porsche, who also gained the sole power to choose who to evict of Jordan and Rachel. Jordan's choice to vote to evict Porsche two days previously came back to haunt her, and she was evicted from the game for the first time, after 69 days in the house. Jordan voted for Rachel to win Big Brother 13.

=== Reindeer Games ===
During the finale of Big Brother 25, a new competition event series entitled Big Brother Reindeer Games was announced to be taking place over six episodes in December 2023. Lloyd was announced as one of the three co-hosts, sharing duties with former Big Brother 23 contestants Derek Xiao and Tiffany Mitchell. The three were referred to as "Santa's Elves".

== The Amazing Race ==
In 2009, rumors appeared online that Lloyd and Schroeder would be appearing on the upcoming 2010 edition of the reality show The Amazing Race. Their position was later confirmed when the cast list was revealed, with the pair being labeled as "Newly Dating." Lloyd and Schroeder won the first leg of the race, came sixth in the second leg, then came in fifth place in the third leg of the race. In the fourth leg, they came in eighth, last place, but they were safe because it was a non-elimination leg. In spite of a penalty "Speed Bump" in the fifth leg, they finished in seventh place. However, they came in last place in the sixth leg and were the fifth team eliminated, finishing in seventh place out of 11 teams.

== Other appearances ==
Lloyd and Jeff Schroeder launched Jeff & Jordan TV as a joint YouTube Channel documenting their family life and producing reality television commentary and other digital programming. Since 2023, they have co-hosted TogetherMess, a weekly podcast about marriage, parenting, popular culture and reality television. In 2026, they began hosting the Big Brother reaction program Couch Jury with Jeff & Jordan on the channel.

== Personal life ==
Lloyd stated after winning season 11 of Big Brother that the first thing she would do with her half-million dollar win was to put a down-payment on a house for herself and her family. She subsequently bought and moved into a 3-bedroom townhouse in Waxhaw, North Carolina with her mother and brother. As planned, she went back to work at the salon and attended school.

Following their appearance together on Big Brother, Lloyd confirmed in October 2009 that she had begun dating fellow contestant Jeff Schroeder. In May 2012, Lloyd and Schroeder moved together to Los Angeles. A web show entitled "Jeff and Jordan do America", which documented their trip to Los Angeles, aired on CBS Interactive in July 2012. Lloyd became engaged to Schroeder in September 2014, after he proposed to her in the backyard of the Big Brother house while they were visiting the season 16 houseguests. Their intended wedding date was October 1, 2016. On April 6, 2016, the couple announced that they had quietly married in March 2016 and are expecting their first child.

During the summer of 2010, Lloyd hosted a segment on RealPlayer SuperPass called "Home Life with Jordan" discussing Big Brother 12, along with fellow Big Brother alumna, Chelsia Hart.

Preceded by Dan Gheesling	Winner of Big Brother; Season 11	Succeeded by Hayden Moss
