= Big Brother 12 (American season) =

Season of the US television series

Coordinates: 34°8′40.12″N 118°23′20.71″W

Big Brother
- Season 12
- Big Brother 12 title card
- Hosted by: Julie Chen
- No. of days: 75
- No. of houseguests: 13
- Winner: Hayden Moss
- Runner-up: Lane Elenburg
- America's Favorite Houseguest: Britney Haynes
- Companion show: Big Brother: After Dark
- No. of episodes: 30

Release
- Original network: CBS
- Original release: July 8 – September 15, 2010

Additional information
- Filming dates: July 3 – September 15, 2010

Season chronology
- ← Previous; Season 11 Next → Season 13

Big Brother 12 is the twelfth season of the American reality television series Big Brother. It is based upon the Netherlands series of the same name, which gained notoriety in 1999 and 2000. The season premiered on CBS on July 8, 2010 and lasted ten weeks until the live finale on September 15, 2010. The twelfth season saw a slight increase in ratings when compared to the past season of the series. The season premiered to a total of 7.35 million viewers, a slight increase from the previous season's launch and the highest for a premiere episode since Big Brother 8. The season finale had a total of 7.89 million viewers, continuing to average slightly above the past season and the highest since the eighth edition. In total, the series averaged 7.76 million viewers, higher than that of the previous two seasons and the highest since Big Brother 5 in 2004. Big Brother 12 was initially set to feature a total of 14 HouseGuests, though one HouseGuest left the show before entering the house and was not replaced. The series ended after 75 days, in which HouseGuest Hayden Moss was crowned the Winner, while Lane Elenburg was crowned the Runner-Up.

== Format ==
The format remained largely unchanged from previous seasons. HouseGuests were sequestered in the Big Brother House with no contact to and from the outside world. Each week, the HouseGuests took part in several compulsory challenges that determined who would win food, luxuries, and power in the House. The winner of the Head of Household competition was immune from nominations and was instructed to nominate two fellow HouseGuests for eviction. After a HouseGuest became Head of Household he or she was ineligible to take part in the next Head of Household competition. HouseGuests also took part in Have vs. Have-Not competitions for which they would be divided into either the "Haves" or the "Have Nots" depending on their performance in the competitions. HouseGuests that became "Have Nots" for the week were only allowed to eat slop and a weekly food restriction, chosen by the viewing public, take cold showers, and sleep on lawn chairs. The winner of the Power of Veto competition won the right to save one of the nominated HouseGuests from eviction. If the Veto winner exercised the power, the Head of Household then had to nominate another HouseGuest for eviction.

On eviction night all HouseGuests except for the Head of Household and the two nominees voted to evict one of the two nominees. Before the voting began the nominees had the chance to record a final message to their fellow HouseGuests. This compulsory vote was conducted in the privacy of the Diary Room by the host Julie Chen. In the event of a tie, the Head of Household would break the tie and reveal their vote in front of the other HouseGuests. Unlike other versions of Big Brother, the HouseGuests could discuss the nomination and eviction process open and freely. The nominee with the most votes from the other HouseGuests was evicted from the House on Thursday and interviewed by Julie Chen. HouseGuests could voluntarily leave the House at any time and those who broke the rules were expelled by Big Brother. The last seven evictees of the season, known as the jury members, voted for the winner on the season finale. The jury members were sequestered in a separate house and were not allowed to watch the show except for segments that included all of the HouseGuests. The jury members were not shown any Diary Room interviews or any footage that included strategy or details regarding nominations.

== HouseGuests ==
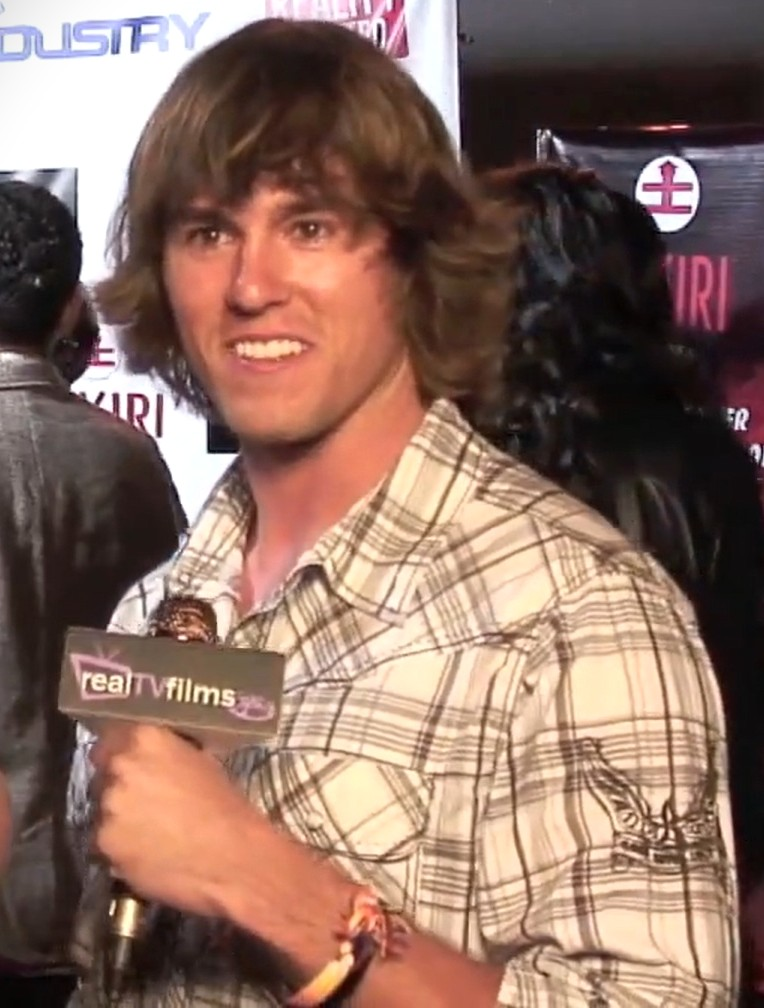
Hayden Moss in 2010

Fourteen HouseGuests had been cast for this season, but one, Paola Aviles, a 30-year-old real estate agent, voluntarily left during the sequester period and was not replaced. The HouseGuests entered the House on July 3, 2010.

Name	Age	Residence	Occupation	Result
Hayden Moss	24	Tempe, Arizona	College student	Winner; Day 75
David "Lane" Elenburg	24	Decatur, Texas	Oil rig salesman	Runner-up; Day 75
Vincenzo "Enzo" Palumbo	32	Bayonne, New Jersey	Insurance adjuster	Evicted; Day 75
Britney Haynes	22	Huntington, Arkansas	Hotel sales manager	Evicted; Day 68
Ragan Fox	34	West Hollywood, California	College professor	Evicted; Day 62
Brendon Villegas	30	Riverside, California	High school swim coach	Evicted; Day 55
Matt Hoffman	32	Elgin, Illinois	Web designer	Evicted; Day 55
Kathy Hillis	40	Texarkana, Arkansas	Deputy sheriff & Sergeant	Evicted; Day 48
Rachel Reilly	25	Las Vegas, Nevada	Cocktail waitress	Evicted; Day 41
Kristen Bitting	24	Philadelphia, Pennsylvania	Boutique manager	Evicted; Day 34
Andrew Gordon	39	Miami Beach, Florida	Podiatrist	Evicted; Day 27
Monet Stunson	24	Glen Carbon, Illinois	Model	Evicted; Day 20
Annie Whittington	27	Tampa, Florida	Bartender	Evicted; Day 13

=== Future appearances ===
Brendon Villegas and Rachel Reilly returned for Big Brother 13 in 2011. While engaged, the duo competed on The Amazing Race 20, and after marrying, they returned for The Amazing Race 24. Rachel later returned for The Amazing Race 31 with her sister (and Big Brother 15 HouseGuest) Elissa. Rachel also made guest appearances on Big Brother 20 to host a Veto competition. In 2018, Reilly and Villegas participated in Celebrity Fear Factor. In 2022, Reilly appeared as a contestant on the USA Network reality competition series, Snake in the Grass. In 2023, Reilly competed on the first season of Peacock's reality TV series The Traitors. In 2025, Reilly competed on Food Network's TV series Worst Cooks in America Celebrity Edition: Heroes vs. Villains. Later that year, Reilly returned to Big Brother as the surprise Houseguest on Big Brother 27.

Britney Haynes returned for Big Brother 14 in 2012 as a coach to new HouseGuests. Britney also competed on The Amazing Race 31 with fellow Big Brother 14 Housemate, Janelle Pierzina. In 2023, Haynes made brief appearances in the premiere and finale episodes of Big Brother 25. Later that year, Haynes competed on Big Brother Reindeer Games. In 2025, Haynes competed on the third season of The Traitors.

Hayden Moss competed on Survivor: Blood vs. Water with his then-girlfriend, Kat Edorsson of Survivor: One World.

In 2020, Enzo Palumbo returned to compete on Big Brother: All-Stars. In 2022, Palumbo competed on The Challenge: USA. In 2025, Palumbo competed on The Amazing Race 38 partnered with a his brother.

== Summary ==
On Day 1, the original thirteen HouseGuests entered the house. Following their introductions, the HouseGuests all learned of the Saboteur twist, in which one HouseGuest was in the house solely to cause drama amongst the group, and could target an individual HouseGuest or the group as a whole. If the Saboteur can make it past the fifth week, they will earn a $50,000 prize and will immediately leave the game. The Saboteur would play the game much like their fellow HouseGuests, being eligible to win Head of Household as well as the Power of Veto. Following this news, the HouseGuests divided into two teams of six to compete in their first Head of Household competition; due to the uneven number of HouseGuests, Andrew chose to sit out from the competition, and it was later revealed that he had earned immunity from the first eviction for doing so. HouseGuests then competed in the "Hot Dog, We Have a Wiener" Head of Household competition. For this competition, one member from each team would ride an over-sized hot dog wiener across the backyard in an attempt to reach the other side without falling; the HouseGuests would earn money depending on when they made it across, with the first HouseGuest receiving $10,000 and the amount decreasing with each person. The HouseGuests could only keep the money if their team won the competition. The last HouseGuest to make it across for their team would win the title of Head of Household. Hayden became the first Head of Household of the season, while Monet was the winner of the $10,000 prize. Upon returning inside, the lights in the house were shut off, and when they were turned back on it was revealed that the Saboteur had locked the storage room, meaning the HouseGuests had nothing except for slop to eat for the next few days.

On Day 2, Enzo, Hayden, Lane, and Matt formed "The Brigade" alliance, with the goal of being the last four HouseGuests remaining. Brendon and Rachel formed a romantic relationship early on after learning they both had a background in science. On Day 4, HouseGuests competed in the "Sweet Tooth" food competition. For this competition, HouseGuests split into three teams, with one member from each team participating at a time. The participants were required to crawl through caramel to reach a pool of popcorn where they would search for plastic teeth; the first two teams to find eight teeth would win, while the losing team would be the Have-Nots for the week. The team of Kathy, Matt, Rachel, and Ragan were the Have-Nots for the week. The Brigade alliance decided to target Brendon for eviction, fearing that he may be the Saboteur as well as a strong physical threat. The group also debated nominating Rachel for eviction due to her romantic relationship with Brendon. Despite this, the Saboteur later placed an "X" of tape on both Britney and Kathy's Memory Wall images after an argument between the two of them occurred, implying they should be nominated that week. On Day 5, Hayden chose to nominate Brendon and Rachel for eviction. When picking players for the Power of Veto competition, Andrew, Enzo, and Monet were selected to compete; Annie was selected to host. On Day 7, HouseGuests competed in the "Cinco de Mayonnaise" Power of Veto competition. For this competition, HouseGuests had to break open various mayonnaise filled pinatas, with various letter tiles inside of them. The HouseGuests would collect tiles and attempt to spell a word with their collected tiles; the HouseGuest with the longest correctly spelled word would win the Power of Veto. Brendon was the winner of the Power of Veto. Following this, The Brigade alliance debated nominating Kathy in his place in an attempt to ensure Rachel's eviction, however, they later feared that Annie had formed an alliance with Brendon and Rachel. In an attempt to cause paranoia in the house, the Saboteur later made a message stating that two HouseGuests were lifelong friends who were playing the game together; this was not true. Annie later found out that she was a candidate to be nominated, and attempted to convince Hayden to nominate Britney for eviction instead. On Day 9, Brendon chose to use the Power of Veto to remove himself from the block, with Annie being nominated in his place. On Day 13, Annie became the first HouseGuest to be evicted from the house in a unanimous vote of ten to zero.

Following Annie's eviction, HouseGuests competed in the "Majority Rules" Head of Household competition. For this competition, the HouseGuests were asked a series of questions about which of two HouseGuests would adhere to certain situations. The object was not to base the answer on personal opinions, but how they thought the majority would answer. The minority of the voters were eliminated each round; if there was a tie, none of the HouseGuests would be eliminated. Rachel was the winner. On Day 14, HouseGuests competed in the "BB Stick 'em Up" food competition. For this competition, HouseGuests split into three teams and taped one of their team members to a wall with the goal of being the last team to have their player on the wall; the winners of the competition would select one team to be the Have-Nots for the week. The other teams could spray water at their opponents, thus causing them to fall sooner. Brendon, Britney, Enzo, and Monet were the Have-Nots for the week. Shortly following the competition, the HouseGuests learned that Annie had been the Saboteur in a video message. Later that day, Rachel chose to nominate Britney and Monet for eviction, with Monet being her main target for eviction. When picking players for the Power of Veto competition, Brendon, Lane, and Enzo were selected to compete; Ragan was selected to host. On Day 15, HouseGuests competed in the "Big Brother Stockades" Power of Veto competition. For this competition, HouseGuests were positioned in a stockade while holding onto a briefcase. The goal of the competition was to drop their briefcase closest to the one-hour mark without going over; the HouseGuest who is closest to one hour without going over would be the winner. Britney was the winner of the Power of Veto. Though Britney and Monet attempted to convince Rachel to nominate Andrew, Matt later offered to go up as a pawn to ensure Monet's eviction. On Day 17, Britney chose to use the Power of Veto to remove herself from the block, with Matt being nominated in her place. On Day 20, Monet became the second HouseGuest to be evicted from the house in a vote of seven to two.

Following Monet's eviction, HouseGuests competed in the "Hang Ten" endurance Head of Household competition. For this competition, HouseGuests stood atop surfboards that would continuously go into and out of the wall. The first five HouseGuests to be eliminated would earn food for the week, while the last four to be eliminated were the Have-Nots for the week. Matt was the winner, while Andrew, Brendon, Enzo, and Ragan were the Have-Nots for the week. Soon after his win, Matt's Brigade alliance began pressuring him to nominate Brendon and Rachel for eviction, however, Matt was upset with Kathy for voting against him the previous week. Matt later made a deal with Brendon and Rachel to keep them safe, with the two promising Matt safety should they win Head of Household the following week. On Day 21, Matt chose to nominate Andrew and Kathy for eviction, though he claimed he would backdoor Brendon should the Power of Veto be used. When picking players for the Power of Veto competition, Brendon, Lane, and Rachel were selected to compete; Enzo was selected to host. On Day 22, HouseGuests competed in the "Veto of Fortune" Power of Veto competition. For this competition, HouseGuests had to determine the quantity of an object used to make an object. Each round, HouseGuests could either stay or fold; folding would allow them to continue in the game, but could not get a point whereas the HouseGuest with the answer closest to the correct one would earn a point, though the farthest was eliminated. Brendon was the winner of the Power of Veto. In an attempt to convince the HouseGuests that Andrew was against Brendon and Rachel, Andrew and Brendon devised a plan to have Andrew announce that he was targeting Brendon and Rachel during the Power of Veto ceremony. On Day 23, Brendon chose not to use the Power of Veto on either nominee. On Day 27, Andrew revealed moments before voting began that Hayden and Kristen had a romantic relationship, causing much drama in the house. Minutes later, Andrew became the third HouseGuest to be evicted from the house in a unanimous vote of eight to zero.

Following Andrew's eviction, HouseGuests competed in the "BB Knockout" Head of Household competition. For this competition, HouseGuests faced off two at a time and were asked questions about past competitions played this season; the winner of each round would select the next two HouseGuests to face off, with the last HouseGuest remaining being the winner. Rachel was the winner. Following her win, Rachel and Kristen engaged in numerous arguments with one another, with Hayden and Brendon also getting involved. On Day 28, HouseGuests competed in the "Big Brother Cop Course" luxury competition. For this competition, HouseGuests split into three teams and attempted to complete an obstacle course in the fastest time while inside a plastic police car. The winning team, along with Rachel, would earn the right to watch the film The Other Guys. Brendon, Enzo, and Hayden were the winning team. Later that day, Rachel chose to nominate Hayden and Kristen for eviction. When picking players for the Power of Veto competition, Britney, Enzo, and Ragan were selected to compete; Brendon was selected to host. On Day 29, HouseGuests competed in "The Wizards of Pinball" Power of Veto competition. For this competition, HouseGuests shot a pinball in an attempt to make it land in the center of the playing field; the HouseGuest furthest away each round was eliminated. Whenever a HouseGuest was eliminated they earned a prize, however, a HouseGuest who is eliminated after them can take that prize. Britney was the winner of the Power of Veto. Following this, Britney made a deal to take Hayden off the block if he could convince Rachel to nominate Kathy in his place. Despite Rachel initially agreeing to this, she later told Britney she would nominate Lane if the Power of Veto was used; Britney, who was close to Lane, later became torn on the situation. On Day 31, Britney chose not to use the Power of Veto on either nominee. When Hayden told Kristen he would not campaign against her, she began to realize that he had an alliance with the other men in the house. She later attempted to get Britney and Ragan on her side and turn against the male alliance, however, they weren't sure if the alliance really existed or not. On Day 34, Kristen became the fourth HouseGuest to be evicted from the house in a vote of six to one.

Following Kristen's eviction, HouseGuests competed in the "True Colors" endurance Head of Household competition. For this competition, HouseGuests stood on an over-sized paint can while holding onto railing on the sides in an attempt to be the last one remaining on the can. The first HouseGuest to drop from the competition would be the only Have-Not for the week. Matt was the winner, while Kathy became the Have-Not for the week. On Day 35, Matt was given the opportunity to open Pandora's Box; he chose to open it. He was awarded with the Diamond Power of Veto, which he could use during a live eviction to remove one nominated HouseGuest from the block as well as name the replacement nominee. Due to Matt opening the box, however, it was revealed to the HouseGuests that a new Saboteur was in the game, with the viewers deciding who the new Saboteur should be; Ragan was selected. Unlike Annie, the new Saboteur would earn $20,000 for completing two weeks worth of sabotage and would not be removed from the game. Matt later lied to his fellow HouseGuests, claiming he had only won a dollar while inside Pandora's Box. Later that day, Matt chose to nominate Brendon and Rachel for eviction. When picking players for the Power of Veto competition, Britney, Enzo, and Kathy were selected to compete; Ragan, who won a Veto Ticket in the previous Power of Veto competition, was also able to compete. On Day 36, HouseGuests competed in the "Lovers Lane" Power of Veto competition. For this competition, former HouseGuests Jordan Lloyd and Jeff Schroeder returned as hosts. One HouseGuests would attempt to knock down as many pins as possible within forty-five seconds, and then challenge one HouseGuest to challenge; if the challenged HouseGuest does better than their challenger, then the challenger is eliminated. Britney was the winner of the Power of Veto. Rachel, in an attempt to get Britney to use the Power of Veto, offered Britney the $5,000 Rachel had won in the previous Power of Veto competition; Rachel believed that if Kathy was nominated against Brendon then Kathy would be evicted. Britney denied to do so, telling Rachel that all of the HouseGuests were against Brendon and Rachel, thus using the Power of Veto would be pointless. On Day 38, Britney chose not to use the Power of Veto on either nominee. Brendon later engaged in numerous arguments with his fellow HouseGuests in an attempt to convince them to evict him over Rachel. On Day 41, Rachel became the fifth HouseGuest to be evicted from the house in a unanimous vote of six to zero. She became the first member of the Jury of Seven.

Following Rachel's eviction, HouseGuests competed in the "Oh What a Tangled Web" Head of Household competition. For this competition, HouseGuests attempted to be the first to fully untangle their rope from various obstacles. The winner of the competition would also select three HouseGuests to be Have-Nots for the week. Brendon was the winner, and chose Britney, Matt, and Ragan to be the Have-Nots for the week. In an attempt to protect himself for the following week, Brendon made a deal with Britney that she would keep him safe should she win Head of Household in exchange for safety this week; she agreed to this deal. On Day 42, Brendon chose to nominate Ragan and Lane for eviction, with Ragan being his main target. When picking players for the Power of Veto competition, Enzo, Hayden, and Kathy were selected to compete. On Day 43, HouseGuests competed in the "Zingbot 3000" Power of Veto competition. For this competition, a robot known as the Zingbot 3000 entered the house to host the competition, which required HouseGuests to travel back and forth on a platform in an attempt to solve a puzzle; the first HouseGuest to solve the puzzle would win the Power of Veto. Ragan was the winner of the Power of Veto. Later that day, Brendon was given the opportunity to open Pandora's Box; he chose to open it. He learned that he would leave the house for twenty-four hours for a spa vacation, where he believed Rachel would be as well; while he was gone, Rachel entered the house for twenty-four hours. During her time in the house, Rachel engaged in numerous arguments with Ragan, and later attempted to communicate with Brendon by spelling "Matt" out with pretzels, implying he should be nominated. On Day 44, Rachel left the house and Brendon returned. On Day 45, Ragan chose to use the Power of Veto to remove himself from the block, with Matt being nominated in his place. On Day 48, Matt chose to use the Diamond Power of Veto to remove himself from the block, nominating Kathy in his place. Minutes later, Kathy became the sixth HouseGuest to be evicted from the house in a unanimous vote of five to zero. She became the second member of the Jury of Seven.

Following Kathy's eviction, HouseGuests competed in the "Big Brother Says" Head of Household competition. For this competition, HouseGuests were asked true or false questions about a game of "Simon Says" the group had played the previous day; an incorrect answer resulted in elimination, and the last HouseGuest remaining was the winner. Britney was the winner. On Day 49, HouseGuests competed in "The Good, the Bad, and the Ugly" food competition. For this competition, HouseGuests competed in teams and all three members took a drink, one of which tasted bad. If the other team could correctly guess which HouseGuest had taken the bad shot, they would earn a point, and the team with the most points would win. The team of Brendon, Enzo, and Hayden became the Have-Nots for the week. Despite having previously promised him safety the previous week, Britney later debated nominating Brendon for eviction. Matt later urged her to nominate Enzo as a pawn against Brendon, though the other members of The Brigade hoped to see Matt nominated as a pawn. Later that day, Britney chose to nominate Brendon and Enzo for eviction. When picking players for the Power of Veto competition, Hayden, Lane, and Matt were selected to compete; Ragan was the host. On Day 50, HouseGuests competed in the "Big Brother Zoo" Power of Veto competition. For this competition, HouseGuests would accept punishments in exchange for Veto points, and could accept prizes in exchange for Veto points; the HouseGuest with the most Veto points would be the winner. Brendon was the winner. Later that day, Britney was given the opportunity to open Pandora's Box; she chose to open it. While she was locked inside with former HouseGuest Jessie Godderz, the other HouseGuests earned a party in the backyard. On Day 52, Brendon chose to use the Power of Veto to remove himself from the block, with Matt being nominated in his place. On Day 55, Matt became the seventh HouseGuest to be evicted from the house in a unanimous vote of four to zero. HouseGuests then took part in a surprise Double Eviction week, meaning another HouseGuest would be evicted that night. HouseGuests competed in the "Delivering the Goods" Head of Household competition. For this competition, HouseGuests had to search through packaging peanuts in an attempt to find the names of the two specific HouseGuests. Hayden was the winner. Hayden then chose to nominate Brendon and Ragan for eviction. HouseGuests then competed in the "Before or After" Power of Veto competition. For this competition, HouseGuests had to determine whether one event happened before or after another by stepping up or down on a staircase. Ragan was the winner. Ragan chose to use the Power of Veto to remove himself from the block, with Britney being nominated in his place. Brendon then became the eighth HouseGuest to be evicted from the house in a unanimous vote of three to zero. He became the fourth member of the Jury of Seven.

Following Matt and Brendon's eviction, HouseGuests competed in the "Big Brother Blackjack" Head of Household competition. For this competition, HouseGuests were given two cards totaling twenty-one and attempted to make their ball land on the grid area with the given cards. The HouseGuest who is the least successful each round is eliminated, with the last HouseGuest remaining winning. Lane was the winner. Ragan, who had come to realize that Enzo, Hayden, and Lane were in an alliance, feared for his safety. Lane was later given the opportunity to open Pandora's Box; he chose to open it. He was able to select three cash prizes, however, for each prize he took a punishment would be placed on the HouseGuests. The punishments bestowed upon the house saw the removal of all of the silverware and cups in the house, speak only with sock puppets for twelve hours, and having to dance whenever music was played in the house. On Day 56, Lane chose to nominate Enzo and Ragan for eviction, with the goal of evicting Ragan. On Day 57, HouseGuests competed in the "Otev the Broadway Clam" Power of Veto competition. For this competition, Otev would sing a song about two HouseGuests and the competing HouseGuests attempt to find a CD named after the two HouseGuests. The last HouseGuest to find the CD each round was eliminated, with the last remaining HouseGuest being the winner. Enzo was the winner. On Day 59, Enzo chose to use the Power of Veto to remove himself from the block, with Hayden being nominated in his place. Lane's decision to not nominate Britney led to Enzo and Hayden being upset with him, though the Brigade still remained intact. Lane also spoke about secretly considering taking Britney to the Final 2 with him if he could, due to his growing bond with her, and also fearing his close friend Hayden would be much more difficult to get the jury votes to defeat. On Day 62, Ragan became the ninth HouseGuest to be evicted from the house in a unanimous vote of two to zero. He became the fifth member of the Jury of Seven.

Following Ragan's eviction, HouseGuests competed in the "Big Brother Christmas" Head of Household competition. For this competition, HouseGuests had to maneuver Christmas ornaments into cups using only their fingers through a fence. The first HouseGuest to get all of their ornaments in the cups, which form the shape of a Christmas tree, and get their star to the top would be the winner. Hayden was the winner. On Day 63, HouseGuests competed in the "Hide and Seek" luxury competition. For this competition, HouseGuests entered the house one at a time and were given ninety seconds to hide their individual coin anywhere in the house. Following this, the HouseGuests searched the house in an attempt to find the other coins; the HouseGuest with the last coin found would win a $10,000 prize. Britney was the winner. Later that day, Hayden chose to nominate Britney and Lane for eviction, largely due to their growing bond and since they would probably not eliminate the other. On Day 64, HouseGuests competed in the "Big Brother Marque" final Power of Veto competition. For this competition, HouseGuests were given various movie posters with the faces of two previously evicted HouseGuests on each of them; there were two facts listed on the board, and the HouseGuests had to match the movie poster with the two HouseGuests described with the facts; there was only one correct order, and the first HouseGuest to finish would be the winner. Hayden was the winner of the final Power of Veto. Following this win, it ensured that Britney would be evicted and that The Brigade would be the final remaining HouseGuests. This led to the Brigade alliance telling Britney that they were aligned and that she would be evicted that week, leading to her breaking down crying. On Day 67, Hayden chose not to use the Power of Veto on either nominee. Minutes later, Enzo cast the sole vote to evict Britney from the house. She became the sixth member of the Jury of Seven.

Following Britney's eviction, HouseGuests began competing in the "Rumble In the Big Brother Jungle" Head of Household competition. For this competition, HouseGuests attempted to be the last one remaining on their swing while being slammed into a wall. Hayden was the winner, thus advancing to the third and final round. Enzo and Lane later competed in the "It's Alive" competition. For this competition, HouseGuests had to correctly figure out which two faces of the HouseGuests made up a set of alien faces. The HouseGuest who finished the competition in the fastest amount of time was the winner. Lane was the winner. On Day 75, Hayden and Lane competed live in the "Jury Statements" final Head of Household competition. For this competition, HouseGuests were asked to finish a sentence made by one of the six members of the Jury of Seven. The HouseGuest with the most points would be the winner. Following a tie-breaker question, Hayden became the final Head of Household of the season. Minutes later, Hayden cast the sole vote to evict Enzo, making Hayden and Lane the Final Two. Hayden was then crowned the winner of Big Brother 12 in a vote of four to three.

== Episodes ==
No. overall	No. in season	Title	Original release date	U.S. viewers (millions)
381	1	"Episode 1"	July 8, 2010	7.35
382	2	"Episode 2"	July 11, 2010	7.04
383	3	"Episode 3"	July 14, 2010	6.38
384	4	"Episode 4"	July 15, 2010	7.10
385	5	"Episode 5"	July 18, 2010	6.92
386	6	"Episode 6"	July 21, 2010	6.50
387	7	"Episode 7"	July 22, 2010	6.74
388	8	"Episode 8"	July 25, 2010	7.19
389	9	"Episode 9"	July 28, 2010	6.71
390	10	"Episode 10"	July 29, 2010	6.52
391	11	"Episode 11"	August 1, 2010	7.11
392	12	"Episode 12"	August 4, 2010	6.97
393	13	"Episode 13"	August 5, 2010	7.14
394	14	"Episode 14"	August 8, 2010	7.56
395	15	"Episode 15"	August 11, 2010	7.09
396	16	"Episode 16"	August 12, 2010	7.24
397	17	"Episode 17"	August 15, 2010	7.46
398	18	"Episode 18"	August 18, 2010	7.61
399	19	"Episode 19"	August 19, 2010	7.55
400	20	"Episode 20"	August 22, 2010	7.73
401	21	"Episode 21"	August 25, 2010	7.99
402	22	"Episode 22"	August 26, 2010	7.87
403	23	"Episode 23"	August 29, 2010	7.80
404	24	"Episode 24"	September 1, 2010	7.87
405	25	"Episode 25"	September 2, 2010	6.54
406	26	"Episode 26"	September 5, 2010	7.19
407	27	"Episode 27"	September 8, 2010	7.82
408	28	"Episode 28"	September 9, 2010	7.83
409	29	"Episode 29"	September 12, 2010	6.66
410	30	"Episode 30"	September 15, 2010	7.86

== Voting history ==
Color key:

Winner
Runner-up
Head of Household
Nominated for eviction
Immune from eviction
Evicted

Voting history (season 12)
	Week 1	Week 2	Week 3	Week 4	Week 5	Week 6	Week 7		Week 8	Week 9	Week 10	
	Week 1	Week 2	Week 3	Week 4	Week 5	Week 6	Day 49	Day 55 (Note: This week was a double eviction week. Following the first eviction, the remaining HouseGuests played a week's worth of games, including Head of Household and veto competitions, and nomination, veto and eviction ceremonies, during the live show, culminating in a second eviction for the week.)	Week 8	Week 9	Day 75	Finale
Head of Household	Hayden	Rachel	Matt	Rachel	Matt	Brendon	Britney	Hayden	Lane	Hayden	Hayden	(None)
Nominations (initial)	Brendon; Rachel	Britney; Monet	Andrew; Kathy	Hayden; Kristen	Brendon; Rachel	Lane; Ragan	Brendon; Enzo	Brendon; Ragan	Enzo; Ragan	Britney; Lane	(None)	(None)
Veto winner(s)	Brendon	Britney	Brendon	Britney	Britney	Ragan; Matt (Note: Matt activated the Diamond Power of Veto, a power he won in "Pandora's Box". This veto could be used to save a nominee, with the owner naming the replacement nominee instead of the current Head of Household. Matt used the veto on himself and named Kathy as the replacement nominee. Ragan was immune from being nominated because he had earlier won the Power of Veto.)	Brendon	Ragan	Enzo	Hayden	(None)	(None)
Nominations (final)	Annie; Rachel	Matt; Monet	Andrew; Kathy	Hayden; Kristen	Brendon; Rachel	Kathy; Lane	Enzo; Matt	Brendon; Britney	Hayden; Ragan	Britney; Lane	Enzo; Lane	(None)
Hayden	Head of Household	Monet	Andrew	Nominated	Rachel	Kathy	Matt	Head of Household	Nominated	Head of Household	Enzo (Note: As Head of Household, Hayden chose to evict Enzo.)	Winner
Lane	Annie	Monet	Andrew	Kristen	Rachel	Nominated	Matt	Brendon	Head of Household	Nominated	Nominated	Runner-up
Enzo	Annie	Monet	Andrew	Kristen	Rachel	Kathy	Nominated	Brendon	Ragan	Britney	Evicted (Day 75)	Hayden
Britney	Annie	Matt	Andrew	Kristen	Rachel	Kathy	Head of Household	Nominated	Ragan	Nominated	Evicted (Day 68)	Lane
Ragan	Annie	Monet	Andrew	Kristen	Rachel	Kathy	Matt	Brendon	Nominated	Evicted (Day 62)		Hayden
Brendon	Annie	Monet	Andrew	Kristen	Nominated	Head of Household	Matt	Nominated	Evicted (Day 55)			Lane
Matt	Annie	Nominated	Head of Household	Kristen	Head of Household	Kathy	Nominated	Evicted (Day 55)				Hayden
Kathy	Annie	Matt	Nominated	Hayden	Rachel	Nominated	Evicted (Day 48)					Hayden
Rachel	Nominated	Head of Household	Andrew	Head of Household	Nominated	Evicted (Day 41)						Lane
Kristen	Annie	Monet	Andrew	Nominated	Evicted (Day 34)							
Andrew	Annie (Note: Andrew was granted immunity for week 1 after he volunteered to be the mascot, which required him to sit out of the first Head of Household competition.)	Monet	Nominated	Evicted (Day 27)								
Monet	Annie	Nominated	Evicted (Day 20)									
Annie	Nominated	Evicted (Day 13)										
Evicted	Annie; 10 of 10 votes to evict	Monet; 7 of 9 votes to evict	Andrew; 8 of 8 votes to evict	Kristen; 6 of 7 votes to evict	Rachel; 6 of 6 votes to evict	Kathy; 5 of 5 votes to evict	Matt; 4 of 4 votes to evict	Brendon; 3 of 3 votes to evict	Ragan; 2 of 2 votes to evict	Britney; Enzo's choice to evict	Enzo; Hayden's choice to evict	Hayden; 4 votes to win
Evicted	Annie; 10 of 10 votes to evict	Monet; 7 of 9 votes to evict	Andrew; 8 of 8 votes to evict	Kristen; 6 of 7 votes to evict	Rachel; 6 of 6 votes to evict	Kathy; 5 of 5 votes to evict	Matt; 4 of 4 votes to evict	Brendon; 3 of 3 votes to evict	Ragan; 2 of 2 votes to evict	Britney; Enzo's choice to evict	Enzo; Hayden's choice to evict	Lane; 3 votes to win

== Production ==
=== Development ===
Big Brother 12 is produced by Endemol USA and Fly on the Wall Entertainment with Allison Grodner and Rich Meehan returning as executive producers. This season of the program was announced on September 10, 2009, five days before the season finale of Big Brother 11. Casting for the program began during the final week of Big Brother 11 with potential applicants submitting video tape submissions that were due by April 23, 2010. Open auditions began on March 27, 2010 in Los Angeles, California and continued across the nation in various cities including Chicago, Illinois; Washington, D.C.; Las Vegas, Nevada; and Columbus, Ohio. Applicants chosen to be a finalist went to Los Angeles, California, from which forty finalists were chosen. CBS warned people of unofficial casting companies charging a fee to audition for the show while casting ended on May 20, 2010. Executive producer Allison Grodner later stated "We're excited for the summer. [...] We're excited for a brand new cast of terrific competitors. And we do have that. There are personalities and backgrounds of people, types of people that we have not seen before in the Big Brother house, which is hard because we've been doing this now for 11, 12 seasons."

=== House ===
As with each season since Big Brother 6, the program was filmed at CBS Studios in Studio City, California. The production team was located in the second story of the House which included the story department, audio department and the switchers and shaders. The house was equipped with 52 cameras and 95 microphones to record the participants. The art department that created the competitions for the program was located outside the house. The house theme was the beach and Miami. The living room featured blue and grey colored walling and furniture. The room that had featured a gym the previous season was now known as the "Cabana" room, and simply featured a large seating area. The bathroom in the house was colored in white, yellow, and brown, while yellow railing and plastic flamingos are featured by the stairs leading to the Head of Household room. There are various palm trees around the kitchen ceiling and the balcony at the Head of Household bedroom. The house included four bedrooms each varying in design and comfort. The Head of Household bedroom featured blue, purple, and white colors while the second bedroom was designed to be given the appearance of sunset. The third room initially used by the HouseGuests was later turned into the Have-Not room, which featured various bugs in jars with lawn chairs used as beds.

=== Prizes ===
The 13 HouseGuests this season were competing for the main prize of $500,000. The winner of the series, determined by the previously evicted HouseGuests, would win the $500,000 prize, while the Runner-Up would receive a $50,000 prize. Other than the main prize, various luxuries and prizes were given out throughout the season.

== Broadcast ==
Big Brother 12 was broadcast on CBS from July 8, 2010 to September 15, 2010. This season lasted a total of 75 days, an increase from the previous season. This season featured some changes to the schedule that was used in the previous edition, with episodes airing on Wednesday, Thursday, and Sunday each week. This is a change from the previous season, which aired on Tuesday instead of Wednesday. The Thursday episode, which aired at 8 pm Eastern Time, featured the live eviction and subsequent Head of Household competition taking place. During the live eviction, the show was hosted by Julie Chen. The Sunday episode, which aired at 8 pm Eastern Time, featured the food competition and nomination ceremony, as well as some highlights from the previous days. The Wednesday episode, which aired at 8 pm Eastern Time, featured the Power of Veto competition and the Power of Veto ceremony, along with more highlights of recent events in the game. The series was broadcast on Global Television Network in Canada.

Much like the previous editions, the live feeds were also available again for this season. HouseGuests enter the house a few days before the premiere, and the feeds are not live for the first few days. They later go live after the broadcast of the launch episode. This season did see the return of the Big Brother: After Dark spin-off series, which aired on Showtime Too nightly from midnight to 3 a.m. Eastern Time. The show served as a live feed into the house, and was edited only for slanderous statements and music copyrights. Much like the previous season, Big Brother 12 is available for digital purchasing on iTunes and Amazon.com. Big Brother maintained an online platform with live subscription feeds from RealNetworks, a redesigned and relaunched website, online videos, full episodes, a fantasy game and segments on Inside Dish with Ross Mathews. For the first time Big Brother launched two Twitter accounts; one featured updates from the production staff and one featured updates from the current Head of Household. Episodes of Big Brother continued to be streamed on CBS Mobile Channel on FLOTV. Mobile users were also able to interact and influence the show through SMS text messaging and, for the first time, a simulation game based on Big Brother was also available to mobile customers. New features included a video trivia game and the "Big Brother Ultimate Fan" contest where the winner was able to attend the season finale meet the HouseGuests.

== Reception ==
=== Ratings ===
The season premiere of Big Brother 12, which aired on CBS on July 8, attracted 7.35 million viewers, with a 2.4 rating in adults 18-49. The ratings were mixed in its timeslot, with its nearest competition, a new episode of Wipeout (another Endemol USA production) on ABC placing first in viewers with 7.9 million viewers. Big Brother 12 was first in total households with a 4.4/8 compared to Wipeout's 4.3/8 and was first in adults 18-34. Both shows tied in the adults 18-49 and adults 25-54 demographics with a 2.4/9 and a 2.9/9 respectively. When compared to the season premiere of Big Brother 11 viewers were up 11%, adults 18-34 posted a 17% increase while both adults 18-49 and adults 25-54 were up 4%. Big Brother 12 has experienced ratings growth versus season 11 in viewership and adults 18-49 for every episode. Episode 22 reached multiple season highs while episode 21 saw the highest adults 18-34 rating since 2007. For the season, Big Brother 12 averaged 7.31 million viewers, a substantial increase over the season 11 average of 6.86 million viewers.

=== Viewing figures ===
"Rating" is the estimated percentage of all televisions tuned to the show, and "share" is the percentage of all televisions in use that are tuned in. "Viewers" is the estimated number viewers that watched a program either while it was broadcast or watched via DVR on the same day the program was broadcast.

Key
†	Season high for that night of the week

#	Air Date	Rating	Share	18-49 (rating/share)	18-34 (rating/share)	Viewers (millions)	Rank (timeslot)	Rank (night)	Source
1	Thursday, July 8	4.4	8	2.5/9	2.2/9	7.35	1 (Tie)	1 (Tie)	
2	Sunday, July 11	4.0	7	2.4/8	2.0/7	7.04	1	1	
3	Wednesday, July 14	3.9	7	2.3/8	1.8/7	6.38	2	2	
4	Thursday, July 15	4.1	8	2.4/9	2.2/9	7.10	2	2	
5	Sunday, July 18	4.1	8	2.3/8	1.8/7	6.92	1	1	
6	Wednesday, July 21	3.9	7	2.2/8	1.8/7	6.50	1	2	
7	Thursday, July 22	4.1	8	2.3/8	1.8/7	6.73	2	2	
8	Sunday, July 25	4.3	8	2.5/8	2.1/8	7.19	1	1	
9	Wednesday, July 28	4.1	8	2.3/8	1.9/7	6.71	1	2	
10	Thursday, July 29	4.0	8	2.3/8	1.6/7	6.52	1	1	
11	Sunday, August 1	4.2	8	2.5/8	2.3/8	7.11	1	1	
12	Wednesday, August 4	4.1	7	2.4/8	2.0/8	6.97	1	2	
13	Thursday, August 5	4.3	8	2.4/8	2.2/8	7.14	1	1	
14	Sunday, August 8	4.5	8	2.5/8	2.1/7	7.56	2	2	
15	Wednesday, August 11	4.2	8	2.4/9	2.0/8	7.10	1	2	
16	Thursday, August 12^{1}	4.3	8	2.4/8	2.0/7	7.24	1	1	
17	Sunday, August 15^{2}	4.4	7	2.4/7	1.9/7	7.46	1	1	
18	Wednesday, August 18	4.4	8	2.6/9	2.2/8	7.61	1	1 (Tie)	
19	Thursday, August 19^{3}	4.5	9	2.5/9	2.0/8	7.55	1	1	
20	Sunday, August 22	4.5	8	2.6/8	2.2/7	7.73	1	2	
21	Wednesday, August 25	4.7	8	2.8/10	2.6/10	7.99 †	1	1 (Tie)	
22	Thursday, August 26^{4}	4.6	8	2.7/10	2.3/9	7.87 †	1	1	
23	Sunday, August 29	4.6	8	2.8/8	2.5/8	7.80 †	3	3	
24	Wednesday, September 1	4.7	8	2.9/10	2.7/10	7.87	1	1	
25	Thursday, September 2^{5}	4.0	7	2.3/7	2.0/7	6.54	1	1	
26	Sunday, September 5	4.6	8	2.4/9	2.0/8	7.19	1	1	
27	Wednesday, September 8	4.6	9	2.7/9	2.5/9	7.82	1	2	
28	Thursday, September 9	4.6	8	2.6/9	2.2/7	7.83	2	2	
29	Sunday, September 12	4.0	8	2.2/5	1.8/5	6.66	2	2	
30	Wednesday, September 15	4.5	8	2.9/8	2.4/7	7.86	2	4	

- ^Note 1: Episode 16 had several preemptions in many regions due to football.
- ^Note 2: Episode 17 had several preemptions, especially in Colorado and Kentucky. Also, due to golf overrun, the show was delayed by over an hour.
- ^Note 3: Episode 19 had several national football preemptions.
- ^Note 4: Episode 22 had several football preemptions in places such as Boston (even though it was shown on WBZ's sister station WSBK).
- ^Note 5: Episode 25 had many preemptions throughout the country, especially in major markets such as New York City and Atlanta, and was only airing at its original time in about 50% of American markets.
