= House Calls: The Big Brother Talk Show =

- House Calls logo
- Genre: Reality; Talk show; Aftershow
- Starring: Gretchen Massey; Marcellas Reynolds (2004–2006)
- Country of origin: United States
- Original language: English
- No. of seasons: 6

Production
- Executive producer: Alison Gronder
- Running time: 30–40 minutes

Original release
- Network: CBS.com
- Release: July 7, 2004 – September 17, 2008

Related
- Big Brother Live Chat (2012–17), Off the Block with Ross and Marissa (2018); Big Brother (American TV series)

House Calls: The Big Brother Talk Show (also known as House Calls) is a spin-off of the American reality television series Big Brother. The program is a live Internet talk show hosted by Gretchen Massey and focuses on events in the Big Brother house as well as taking phone calls from viewers. The show started in 2004 during Big Brother 5 with Marcellas Reynolds as host/co-host and became quite popular. House Calls aired during the fifth through tenth seasons of Big Brother.

== Format ==
In each show Gretchen and a guest host talk and answer viewer questions about events in the "Big Brother" household. Viewers are also able to send in emails to the show which are read on air and subscribers of the live Internet feed are able to submit questions to be chosen as the "SuperPass Question of the Week" which is discussed by the hosts. After each eviction, the evicted HouseGuest would join the hosts and answer viewer questions.

During Big Brother: All-Stars the format was changed to include special guest hosts. This was due to former regular host Marcellas Reynolds being a HouseGuest that season. Marcellas didn't return for subsequent seasons, citing budget cuts at CBS Interactive. For Big Brother 8 a new feature called "Time Capsule" was introduced. The "Time Capsule" was where the HouseGuest leaves a message for him/herself prior to start of the season. "Time Capsule" was previously used in the Internet talk show Survivor After Show.

== Big Brother 8 controversy ==
Due to controversial behavior and remarks expressed by certain HouseGuests during Big Brother 8, evicted HouseGuests that were part of the Big Brother Jury could no longer be interviewed by the press or appear on House Calls and The Early Show while being sequestered. A statement from Big Brother was released and was read by Gretchen on air:

We have made jury members of Big Brother available to the press the past few seasons always with the proviso that their questions not inform the ejected HouseGuest of influences outside his or her personal experience in the House. This season several cast members have made either offensive statements or exhibited controversial behavior, we respect journalist interests and rights to pose questions about these statements but believe at the same time doing so could provide information that influences the final vote and potential outcome of this twelve-week competition. For that reason, the remaining jurors will not be made available to the media for the duration of the program. They will be made available to the press after the Big Brother finale on September 18th.

During Big Brother 10, members of the jury in sequester could still appear on the show, but live phone calls were not taken. Instead, questions were sent in, and only appropriate questions were chosen to interview the evicted jury member. This was to ensure that the interview would not influence the jury member's vote.

== Guest hosts ==
Beginning with Big Brother: All-Stars, House Calls has featured guest hosts alongside Gretchen Massey. During Big Brother: All-Stars and Big Brother 8 guest hosts would host for one episode up to an entire week with few regular guest hosts returning during the season multiple times. Starting with Big Brother 9 there were four main guest hosts with one hosting a different day with the exception of Dick Donato who hosted two days a week.

Big Brother 7: All-Stars
Joe Adalian, TV Editor of Daily Variety; Bunky Miller; Lisa Donahue; Jase Wirey; Marcellas Reynolds
Big Brother 8
Kaysar Ridha; Bunky Miller; Holly King; Erika Landin; Janelle Pierzina
Monday	Tuesday	Wednesday	Thursday	Friday	
Big Brother 9
Daniele Donato	Kaysar Ridha	Dick Donato		Bunky Miller	
Big Brother 10
Daniele Donato	Bunky Miller	Sheila Kennedy	Dick Donato	Kaysar Ridha	Evicted Houseguest

== Cancellation ==
It was announced before Big Brother 11 premiered July 9, 2009, that House Calls had been canceled, due to the fact the show could not find a sponsor. The evicted BB11 houseguests appeared on Inside Dish with Ross Mathews after their evictions during the 2009 season. There was no direct affiliate to interview the evicted housemates during Big Brother 12 and Big Brother 13, but beginning with the 14th season, Big Brother 11 and 13 contestant Jeff Schroeder interviewed the evicted houseguests on CBS's website.
