= Big Brother 9 (American season) =

Coordinates: 34°8′40.12″N 118°23′20.71″W

Big Brother: 'Til Death Do You Part
- Season 9
- Big Brother 9 logo
- Hosted by: Julie Chen
- No. of days: 81
- No. of houseguests: 16
- Winner: Adam Jasinski
- Runner-up: Ryan Quicksall
- America's Favorite Juror: James Zinkand
- Companion shows: House Calls; Big Brother: After Dark
- No. of episodes: 33

Release
- Original network: CBS
- Original release: February 12 – April 27, 2008

Additional information
- Filming dates: February 7 – April 27, 2008

Season chronology
- ← Previous; Season 8 Next → Season 10

Big Brother 9 (also known as Big Brother: 'Til Death Do You Part) is the ninth season of the American reality television series Big Brother. It premiered on CBS on February 12, 2008, and concluded with its season finale on April 27, 2008; it was scheduled as a midseason installment of the series as replacement programming due to the Writers Guild of America strike.

The season's main twist saw the 16 HouseGuests being initially paired into couples with their "soulmate" (two of which being a pre-existing relationship); the couples partook in challenges, votes, and evictions together for the first three weeks of the competition, after which the HouseGuests competed as individuals for the remainder of the season as normal.

Big Brother 9 premiered to a total of 7.33 million viewers, the lowest premiere numbers for any season at the time. Overall, the series averaged 6.56 million viewers, making it the lowest rated season of the series at the time. The season ended after 81 days, in which HouseGuest Adam Jasinski was crowned the winner, and Ryan Quicksall the runner-up.

== Format ==
The format remains largely unchanged from previous seasons. HouseGuests are sequestered in the Big Brother House with no contact to or from the outside world. Each week, the HouseGuests take part in several compulsory challenges that determine who will win food, luxuries, and power in the House. The winner of the weekly Head of Household competition is immune from nominations and must nominate two fellow HouseGuests for eviction. After a HouseGuest becomes Head of Household, he or she is ineligible to take part in the next Head of Household competition. HouseGuests also take part in competitions to earn food for the week. The losing team will be forced to eat Big Brother Slop for the week. This is the third season to feature Slop as the punishment food, as it was originally peanut butter and jelly. The winner of the Power of Veto competition wins the right to save one of the nominated HouseGuests from eviction. If the Veto winner exercises the power, the Head of Household must then nominate another HouseGuest for eviction.

On eviction night, all HouseGuests except for the Head of Household and the two nominees vote to evict one of the two nominees. This compulsory vote is conducted in the privacy of the Diary Room by the host Julie Chen. In the event of a tie, the Head of Household must cast the deciding vote, announcing it in front of the other HouseGuests. Unlike other versions of Big Brother, the HouseGuests may discuss the nomination and eviction process openly and freely. The nominee with the greater number of votes will be evicted from the House on the live Thursday broadcast, exiting to an adjacent studio to be interviewed by Chen. HouseGuests may voluntarily leave the House at any time and those who break the rules may be expelled from the house by Big Brother. The final seven HouseGuests evicted during the season will vote for the winner on the season finale. These "Jury Members" will be sequestered in a separate house and will not be allowed to watch the show except for competitions and ceremonies that include all of the remaining HouseGuests. The jury members will not be shown any Diary Room interviews or any footage that include strategy or details regarding nominations.

This season featured numerous twists to the format. The main twist this season saw the HouseGuests competing as couples; they competed as couples, were nominated as couples, and were evicted as couples. This twist went on until the third week, when the couples were told they could officially play as individuals. Another twist this season saw a previously evicted HouseGuest returning to the game on Day 35, with the returning HouseGuest decided partly by the HouseGuests themselves. This season also introduced the Power Couple twist, in which the winners of this title were required to evict one couple from the house in a matter of a few days.

== HouseGuests ==
The cast of Big Brother:Til Death do you Part. Top: Parker, James, and Adam Middle: Ryan, Sharon, Natalie, Matt, Amanda, Jen, and Jacob Bottom: Chelsia, Alex, Sheila, Joshuah, Neil, and Allison

The cast was revealed on February 6, 2008. In the cast of 16, two prior relationships were included as a cast twists. Firstly, Sharon Obermueller and Jacob Heald previously dated before the season, and were forced to pair together in the couple twist. Secondly, Ryan Quicksall and Jen DiTurno secretly date when they enter the house; however, they aren't partnered in the couples twist.

Name	Age on entry	Occupation	Residence	Day entered	Result
Adam Jasinski	29	Public relations manager	Delray Beach, Florida	1	Winner; Day 81
Ryan Quicksall	27	College student	Columbus, Ohio	1	Runner-up; Day 81
Sheila Kennedy	45	Former model	Reseda, California	1	Evicted; Day 77
Sharon Obermueller	23	Real estate broker	Olathe, Kansas	1	Evicted; Day 3
Sharon Obermueller	23	Real estate broker	Olathe, Kansas	7	Evicted; Day 75
Natalie Cunial	28	Bikini barista	Salem, Oregon	1	Evicted; Day 70
James Zinkand	21	Cyclist	Sarasota, Florida	35	Evicted; Day 63
James Zinkand	21	Cyclist	Sarasota, Florida	1	Evicted; Day 35
Joshuah Welch	25	Advertising media buyer	Dallas, Texas	1	Evicted; Day 56
Chelsia Hart	21	College student	Cedar Falls, Iowa	1	Evicted; Day 49
Matt McDonald	23	Roofing foreman	Charlestown, Massachusetts	1	Evicted; Day 42
Allison Nichols	28	Pharmaceutical sales representative	Boston, Massachusetts	1	Evicted; Day 28
Alex Coladonato	24	DJ company owner	Staten Island, New York	1	Evicted; Day 21
Amanda Hansen	23	Paralegal	Fridley, Minnesota	1	Evicted; Day 21
Jen Diturno	26	Bartender	Columbus, Ohio	1	Evicted; Day 14
Parker Somerville	26	Paparazzo	Northridge, California	1	Evicted; Day 14
Neil Garcia	29	Realtor	Los Angeles, California	1	Walked; Day 7
Jacob Heald	23	Electrician	Dallas, Georgia	1	Evicted; Day 3

=== Future appearance ===
Matt McDonald participated in a food competition in the following season, which featured a representative from each previous season. Matt McDonald also participated in Season 6, episode 16 of Fear Factor. Parker Somerville and Alex Coladonato attended the premiere of Big Brother 20.

== Summary ==
On Day 1, the original sixteen HouseGuests entered the house. HouseGuests Jen and Ryan, a couple outside of the house, were aware of each other's presence while ex-couple Jacob and Sharon were surprised to find one another in the house. Following their entrance, the HouseGuests learned of the season's twist, in which they would be partnered with their "soulmate" and compete as a couple. The HouseGuests then learned the identity of their soulmates; Adam & Sheila were paired together, while Alex & Amanda, Allison & Ryan, Chelsia & James, Jacob & Sharon, Jen & Parker, Joshuah & Neil, and Matt & Natalie were paired together. HouseGuests Adam & Sheila immediately began to clash, annoying their fellow HouseGuests. The couples then learned of the Power Couple twist, in which the winner of this title would choose to evict one of the couples from the house in a matter of days. HouseGuests then competed in the "Falling For You" Power Couple competition. For this competition, one person from each couple was hooked onto a zipline, while their partner had to hold onto them while being suspended in the air. The last couple remaining suspended without falling would be the winning team. Midway through the competition, it was revealed that if a couple managed to get a pillow laying below them and went on to win the competition, they would earn a $10,000 prize. Ultimately, Jen & Parker won the Power Couple competition, as well as the $10,000 prize. On Day 2, in an attempt to cause drama, Jacob began telling some of the HouseGuests that Parker was a "snake" not to trust him. When Jen found out, she informed Parker of this, leading to a confrontation during which Jacob claimed he had been told this by another HouseGuest. Sharon, in an attempt to save herself and her partner, implied to Parker that Ryan had made the statement. Fearing that Parker would vote to evict Ryan, Jen informed Parker that she and Ryan were a couple outside of the house; Ryan then told Allison, as he felt it was unfair for her not to know. On Day 3, Jen & Parker cast the sole vote to evict Jacob & Sharon from the house.

Following Jacob & Sharon's eviction, HouseGuests competed in the "Do You Know Your Partner?" Head of Household competition. For this competition, Big Brother 8 HouseGuests Eric Stein and Jessica Hughbanks returned to host. The HouseGuests were required to answer questions about their partners preferences in a relationship; the team with the most points at the end of the competition would be the winner. Alex & Amanda were the winners, becoming the first couple to win Head of Household. Fearing Allison was going to tell the house about Jen and Ryan's relationship, Jen & Parker decided to tell the other HouseGuests about their relationship. Though believing the others would appreciate their honesty, the HouseGuests were upset by their relationship. Following this, Alex & Amanda and Matt & Natalie formed an alliance, vowing to be the last remaining couples. Allison and Sheila, believing Allison would be evicted that week, lied to Joshuah and Chelsia stating that they were a lesbian couple, and had known each other before entering the house. On Day 7, Alex & Amanda chose to nominate Allison & Ryan and Jen & Parker for eviction. Later that day, Neil chose to walk from the game due to an unspecified urgent personal matter; Joshuah was given the option to bring either Jacob or Sharon back as his partner, and he chose Sharon. When picking the fourth couple to compete for the Power of Veto competition, Matt & Natalie were selected to compete; Joshuah was selected to host. On Day 9, HouseGuests competed in the "In Sickness and in Health" Power of Veto competition. For this competition, one member of each couple was strapped to a spinning heart while holding onto a button. Their partner was required to spin the heart, and the first couple to reach 300 spins without letting go of their button would be the winning couple. Matt & Natalie were the winners of the Power of Veto. On Day 11, Matt & Natalie chose not to use the Power of Veto on either nominated couple. On Day 14, Jen & Parker became the second couple to be evicted from the house in a vote of three to one.

Following Jen & Parker's eviction, HouseGuests competed in the "Big Brother Democracy" Head of Household competition. For this competition, the couples were given the option of two punishments or prizes for the house, and had to attempt to answer in the majority; answering in the majority would give the couple a point, though the answer selected would impact the house. Chelsia and James were the winners. Shortly afterwards, James made a promise to Matt that he would not be nominated that week. On Day 15, HouseGuests competed in the "What a Catch!" food competition. For this competition, the couples split into two teams of three; one half of each couple held nets into the air, while the opposing team attempted to fill up their nets with dead fish. The last team remaining would be the winners, while the losers were on slop for the week. The team of Adam & Sheila, Alex & Amanda, and Chelsia & James were the losers, thus were on slop for the week. Later that day, Chelsia & James chose to nominate Alex & Amanda and Matt & Natalie for eviction. When picking players for the Power of Veto competition, Joshuah & Sharon were the couple selected to compete; Adam was selected to host. On Day 16, HouseGuests competed in the "Communication Breakdown" Power of Veto competition. For this competition, the couples were required to find cables in a storage area packed among thousands of peanuts found in barrels; they then had to get the correct sized cables to connect their four electrical poles to their individual generator, and the first couple to finish were the winners. Joshuah & Sharon were the winners of the Power of Veto, and also earned the house information from outside the house. That night, Allison had an allergic reaction, while Amanda fainted and had a seizure due to low blood sugar. Both were medically evacuated from the house for the night, and returned the following morning. On Day 18, Joshuah & Sharon chose not to use the Power of Veto on either nominee. Despite the house planning to evict Alex & Amanda, Allison later began convincing Joshuah & Sharon to evict Matt & Natalie from the house, feeling they were the stronger couple. Despite this being the plan, Allison informed Joshuah & Sharon minutes before the eviction that she and Ryan would not be going through with the plan. On Day 21, Alex & Amanda became the third couple to be evicted from the house in a unanimous vote of three to zero.

Following Alex & Amanda's eviction, HouseGuests competed in the "Words of Love" Head of Household competition. For this competition, HouseGuests competed in heats; the men went first, and were followed by the women. The HouseGuests were asked questions about the various quotes hanging on the walls of the house. If a HouseGuest answered a question correctly, they would eliminate one HouseGuest from the competition; the man and woman who won each round would then face off in the final round, with the winner earning both them and their partner the title of Head of Household for the week. Joshuah & Sharon were the winners. Shortly following their win, Joshuah and Allison engaged in numerous verbal arguments due to Joshuah being mad at Allison for changing her vote last minute, as well as the lesbian lie she had told earlier in the game. Due to these arguments, Allison debated quitting the game, though was later convinced in the Diary Room to stay; she did, however, have a restraining order placed on Joshuah, and he was forbidden to be within five feet of her. On Day 22, HouseGuests competed in the "Big Aspara-Guess!" food competition. For this competition, the men were required to guess the weight of their partners and then gather enough asparagus to weigh the same amount. If they got within ten pounds of their partner's weight, the HouseGuests won the two major food groups that couple represented. Later that day, Joshuah & Sharon chose to nominate Allison & Ryan and Matt & Natalie for eviction. When picking players for the Power of Veto competition, Adam & Sheila were selected to compete; James was selected to host. On Day 23, HouseGuests competed in the "Cupid is as Cupid Does" Power of Veto competition. For this competition, the couples were required to solve a puzzle by lifting the women into the air through a harness, while the men ran the puzzle pieces to them. Matt & Natalie were the winners of the Power of Veto. On Day 24, the HouseGuests learned that sometime in the coming weeks an alarm would go off in the house, and this meant that a twist would occur. On Day 25, Matt & Natalie chose to use the Power of Veto to remove themselves from the block, with Adam & Sheila being nominated in their place. On Day 28, Allison and Ryan were announced as the fourth couple to be evicted from the house in a unanimous vote of two to zero. Before they could exit the house, however, the alarm went off, and the HouseGuests learned that they were officially playing the game as individuals. The HouseGuests then learned that they would be voting to evict either Allison or Ryan from the house, rather than the both of them being evicted. Allison then became the first individual HouseGuest to be evicted from the house in a unanimous vote of six to zero.

Following Allison's eviction, HouseGuests competed in the "Time After Time" Head of Household competition. For this competition, HouseGuests were asked true or false questions as to whether one event occurred before or after another event. Ryan was the winner. Shortly afterwards, Adam, James, Matt, and Ryan formed an alliance, and chose to target Sharon that week. On Day 29, HouseGuests competed in the "A Little 'Fon Will 'Due' Ya!" food competition. For this competition, HouseGuests were separated into two teams, and were required to get into two pools of chocolate one at a time and spell out words with the letters inside. The team with the most correctly spelled words would win the competition, but would only win the food items they had spelled. The team of Chelsia, Joshuah, Sharon, and Sheila were the losers, thus were put on the slop diet for the week. That same day, Ryan chose to nominate Sharon and Chelsia for eviction. Following this, Chelsia, James, Joshuah, Sharon, and Sheila devised a plan to get Ryan to backdoor Matt that week, and they told Natalie in hopes of getting her to agree with the plan. Despite initially agreeing, she later informed Matt of this plan. When picking players for the Power of Veto competition, Adam, Sheila, and Joshuah were selected to compete; Matt was selected to host. On Day 30, HouseGuests competed in the "Color of Veto" Power of Veto competition. For this competition, HouseGuests used an over-sized pool stick to shoot their ball as close as possible to the center of the pool table. The HouseGuest furthest away each round was eliminated, and would be able to select a prize. Ryan was the winner of the competition, however, chose to take a prize and allowed Chelsia to win the Power of Veto. Despite Ryan agreeing to the plan to backdoor Matt, Sheila later became offended by Chelsia and attempted to convince Ryan to keep Matt in the game. On Day 32, Chelsia chose to use the Power of Veto to remove herself from the block, with James being nominated in her place. On Day 35, James became the seventh HouseGuest to be evicted from the house in a vote of five to one. Following this, it was revealed that the viewers had voted for one HouseGuest to return to the game, and that the current HouseGuests would vote to either bring back America's selection or the recently evicted James; though not revealed to the HouseGuests, Alex was selected by the viewers to return. James was later voted back into the house in a vote of five to three.

Following these events, HouseGuests competed in the "Big Brother Disco" endurance Head of Household competition. For this competition, HouseGuests stood atop gold discs attached to the tops of hanging disco balls and were spun around continuously while holding on with the chains used to attach the disco balls to the metal structure. The last HouseGuest remaining on their ball without falling would become the new Head of Household. When James and Natalie were the last two remaining, James promised Natalie that both she and Matt would be safe if she allowed him to win Head of Household. This led to Natalie dropping out of the competition, making James the winner. James, upset that three people had voted for him not to return, attempted to figure out who had voted for Alex to return. Though Ryan and Sheila confessed to their votes, Matt continued to deny that he had cast the third vote. On Day 36, James chose to nominate Ryan and Sheila for eviction. When picking players for the Power of Veto competition, Matt, Chelsia, and Joshuah were selected to compete; Natalie was selected to host. On Day 37, HouseGuests competed in the "Trapped in the Cage" Power of Veto competition. For this competition, players were required to walk along a series of balance beams in an attempt to transfer 500 blocks from a cage to their tube. They could only move two blocks at a time, and dropping a block or falling would result in their elimination; the first HouseGuest to successfully get their blocks into their tube would win. James was the winner, making him the first HouseGuest this season to win both Head of Household and Power of Veto in the same week. Despite James wanting to backdoor Adam, Sharon later convinced James that Matt had been the third vote and should be evicted that week. On Day 39, James chose to use the Power of Veto to remove Sheila from the block, with Matt being nominated in her place. On Day 42, Matt became the eighth HouseGuest to be evicted from the house when James broke a tie in Ryan's favor. He became the first member of the Jury of Seven.

Following Matt's eviction, HouseGuests competed in the "En Garde" Head of Household competition. For this competition, the HouseGuests faced off two at a time and attempted to be the first to correctly answer which evicted HouseGuest made a statement in the Diary Room. The winner of each round would select the next two to face off, with the last remaining HouseGuest becoming the winner. Adam was the winner. On Day 43, HouseGuests competed in the "Big Brother Blackjack" luxury competition. For this competition, HouseGuests were dealt cards with the faces of the current HouseGuests, as well as a number, printed on them. To get points, the HouseGuests had to buzz in and state which three cards would add up to 21, thus earning a chip. The winner would earn the right to see the film 21, along with three other HouseGuests of their choice. Though Ryan won the competition, he later competed in a bonus round and lost the right to the prize and film. This led to Chelsia, Joshuah, Sharon, and Sheila winning the competition. That same day, Adam chose to nominate Chelsia and James for eviction. When picking players for the Power of Veto competition, Joshuah, Sheila, and Sharon were selected to compete. Former HouseGuest "Evel" Dick Donato returned to host the competition. On Day 44, HouseGuests competed in the "Club Evel" Power of Veto competition. For this competition, HouseGuests attempted to drink numerous drink mixtures, with the HouseGuests earning one croquet shot for each drink they successfully finished. The HouseGuests then attempted to get the highest score in a game of croquet, and the HouseGuest with the most points was the winner. James was the winner of the Power of Veto for the second week in a row. On Day 46, James chose to use the Power of Veto to remove himself from the block, with Sharon being nominated in his place. On Day 49, Chelsia became the ninth HouseGuest to be evicted from the house in a unanimous vote of five to zero. She became the second member of the Jury of Seven.

Following Chelsia's eviction, HouseGuests competed in the "Big Brother Election" Head of Household competition. For this competition, HouseGuests were asked questions based on the answers that viewers had provided on online polls. The HouseGuest with the most correct answers would win. Natalie was the winner. Shortly after this, Adam, Natalie, Ryan, and Sheila formed the "Team Christ" alliance. On Day 50, HouseGuests competed in the "To Slop or Not to Slop" food competition. For this competition, HouseGuests were required to insert cards into their watermelon and choose either slop or food, with the goal being to stay in the minority. If three or more HouseGuests choose their slop cards, then those people would be on slop; if three or more chose the food card, they would be on slop. Ultimately, Adam was the only HouseGuest with food that week. Later that day, Natalie chose to nominate James and Joshuah for eviction. When picking players for the Power of Veto competition, Ryan, Sharon, and Sheila were selected to compete; Adam was selected to host. On Day 51, HouseGuests competed in the "Big Brother Boardwalk" Power of Veto competition. For this competition, HouseGuests had to determine the quantity of an object used to make an object. Each round, HouseGuests could either stay or fold; folding would allow them to continue in the game, but could not get a point whereas the HouseGuest with the answer closest to the correct one would earn a point, though the farthest is eliminated. Ultimately, James was the winner of the Power of Veto for the third consecutive week. On Day 53, James chose to use the Power of Veto to remove himself from the block, with Sharon being nominated in his place. On Day 56, Joshuah became the tenth HouseGuest to be evicted from the house in a vote of three to one. He became the third member of the Jury of Seven.

Following Joshuah's eviction, HouseGuests competed in the "More...or Less" Head of Household competition. For this competition, HouseGuests were given false statements that revolved around numbers, and had to determine whether the correct answer was more or less than the given answer; the first HouseGuest to reach seven points would be the winner. Adam was the winner. On Day 57, HouseGuests competed in the "A True Big Brother Mash" food competition. For this competition, HouseGuests had to make pathways out of mashed potatoes and gravy in an attempt to fill up containers to earn food for the week. Later that day, Adam chose to nominate Sharon and Sheila for eviction. On Day 58, HouseGuests competed in "The Rainmaker" Power of Veto competition. For this competition, HouseGuests were given an event from earlier this season, and were required to find rocks in the backyard stating when the event happened. The last HouseGuest to bring the correct answer each round was eliminated. Ryan was the winner of the Power of Veto. Following this, the other members of Team Christ began to become suspicious of Natalie, feeling she was aligned with almost everyone in the house. On Day 60, Ryan chose to use the Power of Veto to remove Sheila from the block, with James being nominated in her place. On Day 63, James became the eleventh HouseGuest to be evicted from the house in a unanimous vote of three to zero. He became the fourth member of the Jury of Seven.

Following James' eviction, HouseGuests competed in the "Glass Houses" endurance Head of Household competition. For this competition, HouseGuests were required to hang onto either a bar or rope while hanging inside of a glass box suspended in the air; the last HouseGuest remaining in their box is the winner. Sheila was the winner. During the competition, Sheila promised Natalie safety in exchange for dropping out of the competition, a deal which she agreed to. Despite this, all of the HouseGuests were united against Natalie that week. On Day 64, Sheila chose to nominate Adam and Sharon for eviction. That night, HouseGuests competed in the "PoTV" Power of Veto competition. For this competition, HouseGuests had to use remote controls in an attempt to change the channels, thus forming an image on an over-sized television. The HouseGuest to complete the competition in the fastest time would be the winner. Adam was the winner of the Power of Veto. On Day 67, Adam chose to use the Power of Veto to remove himself from the block, with Natalie being nominated in his place. Despite feeling safe, Natalie was later confronted by the other HouseGuests and questioned about her true intentions. Following this, Adam and Ryan came up with a plan to split the vote, forcing Sheila to cast the deciding vote. On Day 70, Natalie became the twelfth HouseGuest to be evicted from the house when Sheila broke a tie in Sharon's favor. She became the fifth member of the Jury of Seven.

Following Natalie's eviction, HouseGuests competed in the "Fact or Fiction" Head of Household competition. For this competition, HouseGuests were given statements, and had to determine whether this statement was fact or fiction. Ryan was the winner. On Day 71, HouseGuests competed in the "What Happens In Vegas..." luxury competition. For this competition, HouseGuests had to break prop bottles over each other's heads, with some bottles having dice rings; the dice were placed in boxes on a playing board, and the first team to have an occupied box on their board get selected would win the chance to see the film What Happens in Vegas.... Sharon and Ryan were the winners. Later that day, Ryan chose to nominate Sharon and Sheila for eviction. On Day 72, HouseGuests competed in the "Big Brother Derby" final Power of Veto competition. For this competition, HouseGuests had to put the faces of the five Jury members onto headless jockeys, and had to figure out which two given facts went with each HouseGuest; the first HouseGuest to complete this would be the winner. Ryan was the winner. On Day 74, Ryan chose not to use the Power of Veto on either nominee. On Day 74, Sharon became the thirteenth HouseGuest to be evicted from the house when Adam cast the sole vote against her.

Following Sharon's eviction, HouseGuests competed in the "Up a Creek" endurance Head of Household competition. For this competition, HouseGuests had to sit on boogie boards while holding onto a rope going against a stream of water. Ryan was the winner of this round. On Day 76, Adam and Sheila competed against one another in the "Who's the Guinea Pig Now?" competition. For this, HouseGuests had to rotate a giant hamster wheel attached to their neck in an attempt to get a ball through a maze. Adam was the winner. On Day 77, Adam and Ryan competed in the "Jury Statements" final Head of Household competition. For this, HouseGuests had to attempt to finish a sentence made by the six members of the Jury of Seven. Ryan was the winner, thus became the final Head of Household. He then cast the sole vote to evict Sheila from the house. On Day 81, Adam was crowned the winner of Big Brother 9 in a vote of six to one.

== Episodes ==
No. overall	No. in season	Title	Original release date	U.S. viewers (millions)
289	1	"Episode 1"	February 12, 2008	6.88
290	2	"Episode 2"	February 13, 2008	5.65
291	3	"Episode 3"	February 17, 2008	6.58
292	4	"Episode 4"	February 19, 2008	5.22
293	5	"Episode 5"	February 20, 2008	5.76
294	6	"Episode 6"	February 24, 2008	5.39
295	7	"Episode 7"	February 26, 2008	6.72
296	8	"Episode 8"	February 27, 2008	5.38
297	9	"Episode 9"	March 2, 2008	6.23
298	10	"Episode 10"	March 4, 2008	6.18
299	11	"Episode 11"	March 5, 2008	5.58
300	12	"Episode 12"	March 9, 2008	6.37
301	13	"Episode 13"	March 11, 2008	5.87
302	14	"Episode 14"	March 12, 2008	5.31
303	15	"Episode 15"	March 16, 2008	6.28
304	16	"Episode 16"	March 18, 2008	5.38
305	17	"Episode 17"	March 19, 2008	6.60
306	18	"Episode 18"	March 23, 2008	6.46
307	19	"Episode 19"	March 25, 2008	5.96
308	20	"Episode 20"	March 26, 2008	5.87
309	21	"Episode 21"	March 30, 2008	7.46
310	22	"Episode 22"	April 1, 2008	6.12
311	23	"Episode 23"	April 2, 2008	5.94
312	24	"Episode 24"	April 6, 2008	6.32
313	25	"Episode 25"	April 8, 2008	6.18
314	26	"Episode 26"	April 9, 2008	5.84
315	27	"Episode 27"	April 13, 2008	8.25
316	28	"Episode 28"	April 15, 2008	6.20
317	29	"Episode 29"	April 16, 2008	6.09
318	30	"Episode 30"	April 20, 2008	6.35
319	31	"Episode 31"	April 22, 2008	6.50
320	32	"Episode 32"	April 23, 2008	6.60
321	33	"Episode 33"	April 27, 2008	6.39

== Voting history ==
Color key:

Winner
Runner-up
Head of Household
Nominated for eviction
Walked
Evicted
Eviction nullified
Re-entered the game

Voting history (season 9)
	Couples phase				Individual phase										
	Week 1		Week 2	Week 3		Week 4		Week 5	Week 6	Week 7	Week 8	Week 9	Week 10	Week 11	
	Day 1	Day 4	Week 2	Day 22	Day 28	Eviction	Voteback	Week 5	Week 6	Week 7	Week 8	Week 9	Week 10	Day 77	Finale
Head(s) of Household	(None)	Alex & Amanda	Chelsia & James	Joshuah & Sharon		Ryan	(None)	James	Adam	Natalie	Adam	Sheila	Ryan	Ryan	(None)
Nominations (initial)	(None)	Allison & Ryan; Jen & Parker	Alex & Amanda; Matt & Natalie	Allison & Ryan; Matt & Natalie	(None)	Chelsia; Sharon	(None)	Ryan; Sheila	Chelsia; James	James; Joshuah	Sharon; Sheila	Adam; Sharon	Sharon; Sheila	(None)	(None)
Veto winner(s)	(None)	Matt & Natalie	Joshuah & Sharon	Matt & Natalie	(None)	Chelsia	(None)	James	James	James	Ryan	Adam	Ryan	(None)	(None)
Nominations (final)	(None)	Allison & Ryan; Jen & Parker	Alex & Amanda; Matt & Natalie	Adam & Sheila; Allison & Ryan	Allison; Ryan	James; Sharon	Alex; James	Matt; Ryan	Chelsia; Sharon	Joshuah; Sharon	James; Sharon	Natalie; Sharon	Sharon; Sheila	Adam; Sheila	(None)
Adam	No vote	Jen & Parker	Alex & Amanda	Nominated	Allison	James	James	Ryan	Head of Household	Joshuah	Head of Household	Sharon	Sharon	Nominated	Winner
Ryan	No vote	Nominated	Alex & Amanda	Nominated		Head of Household	Alex	Nominated	Chelsia	Joshuah	James	Natalie	Head of Household	Sheila (Note: As Head of Household, Ryan chose to evict Sheila.)	Runner-up
Sheila	No vote	Jen & Parker	Alex & Amanda	Nominated	Allison	James	Alex	Ryan	Chelsia	Joshuah	James	Natalie (Note: As the vote was tied, the Head of Household cast the tie-breaker vote.)	Nominated	Evicted (Day 77)	Adam
Sharon	No vote	Jen & Parker	Alex & Amanda	Co-Head of Household		Nominated	James	Matt	Nominated	Nominated	Nominated	Nominated	Nominated	Evicted (Day 75)	Adam
Natalie	No vote	Allison & Ryan	Nominated	Allison & Ryan	Allison	James	James	Ryan	Chelsia	Head of Household	James	Nominated	Evicted (Day 70)		Adam
James	No vote	Jen & Parker	Co-Head of Household	Allison & Ryan	Allison	Nominated	Evicted (Day 35)	Matt	Chelsia	Sharon	Nominated	Re-evicted (Day 63)			Adam
Joshuah	No vote	Jen & Parker	Alex & Amanda	Co-Head of Household		James	James	Matt	Chelsia	Nominated	Evicted (Day 56)				Ryan
Chelsia	No vote	Jen & Parker	Co-Head of Household	Allison & Ryan	Allison	Sharon	James	Matt	Nominated	Evicted (Day 49)					Adam
Matt	No vote	Allison & Ryan	Nominated	Allison & Ryan	Allison	James	Alex	Nominated	Evicted (Day 42)						Adam
Allison	No vote	Nominated	Alex & Amanda	Nominated		Evicted (Day 28)									
Alex	No vote	Co-Heads of Household	Nominated	Evicted (Day 21)											
Amanda	No vote	Co-Heads of Household	Nominated	Evicted (Day 21)											
Jen	Jacob & Sharon (Note: Jen & Parker won the opening night competition and became the "power couple." They had the power to evict any other couple from the house. Jen & Parker chose to evict Jacob & Sharon on day 3.)	Nominated	Evicted (Day 14)												
Parker	Jacob & Sharon	Nominated	Evicted (Day 14)												
Neil	No vote	Walked (Day 7)													
Jacob	No vote	Evicted (Day 3)													
Evicted	Jacob & Sharon; Jen & Parker's choice to evict	Sharon; Joshuah's choice to return (Note: Neil left the game on day 7 citing an "urgent personal matter". Since the format of this season required couples, Joshuah had to choose either Sharon or Jacob to return to the house as his new partner; he chose Sharon.)	Alex & Amanda; 3 of 3 votes to evict	Allison & Ryan; 2 of 2 votes to evict (Note: The couples split up on day 28 after the reveal of the eviction vote. Julie then informed the HouseGuests that there would be a second vote to determine whether Allison or Ryan would be officially evicted as an individual.)	Allison; 6 of 6 votes to evict	James; 5 of 6 votes to evict	James; 5 of 8 votes to return (Note: The audience had the chance to decide whether Jacob, Jen, Parker, Alex, Amanda, or Allison would be given a chance to re-enter to the house. The audience chose Alex. Following James' eviction on day 35, the HouseGuests then had to vote on whether to bring back James or Alex (known only to them as "mystery HouseGuest"). James re-entered the house in a 5-3 vote.)	Matt; 4 of 7 votes to evict	Chelsia; 5 of 5 votes to evict	Joshuah; 3 of 4 votes to evict	James; 3 of 3 votes to evict	Natalie; 2 of 3 votes to evict	Sharon; Adam's choice to evict	Sheila; Ryan's choice to evict	Adam; 6 votes to win
Evicted	Jacob & Sharon; Jen & Parker's choice to evict	Jen & Parker; 3 of 4 votes to evict	Alex & Amanda; 3 of 3 votes to evict	Allison & Ryan; 2 of 2 votes to evict	Allison; 6 of 6 votes to evict	James; 5 of 6 votes to evict	James; 5 of 8 votes to return	Matt; 4 of 7 votes to evict	Chelsia; 5 of 5 votes to evict	Joshuah; 3 of 4 votes to evict	James; 3 of 3 votes to evict	Natalie; 2 of 3 votes to evict	Sharon; Adam's choice to evict	Sheila; Ryan's choice to evict	Ryan; 1 vote to win

== Production ==
=== Development ===
Following the 2007–08 Writers Guild of America strike, the trade magazine Variety reported that CBS, in response to the then-ongoing Writers Guild of America strike, was considering airing a winter edition of Big Brother, and that the network started cast auditions. Several sites speculated that the winter edition could have been an American version of Celebrity Big Brother but this was untrue as CBS released a statement that the next edition of Big Brother would be a regular season following the format of past editions. The season was announced on November 15, 2007 with open casting calls being held from November 17, 2007 to December 8, 2007. The finalists for the season were chosen on December 27, 2007.

=== House ===
House pictures were released on February 6, 2008. The house has an outdoors theme due to this being the first season to air during the winter season. The house also includes a theme of love, in alignment with the season's twist.

Throughout the house, there are numerous love quotes written by Oscar Wilde, William Shakespeare, Fyodor Dostoevsky, and Johann Wolfgang von Goethe. In the dining room and kitchen, the furniture are in bright red and yellow colors, and logs stacked against each other fill up a wall. The walkway to the Head of Household room evokes a giant library. The Head of Household room is an exotic island oasis. The headboard is made from a surfboard, there are Hula girl table lamps, rattan carpet and Polynesian knickknacks. The boat bedroom features shelves and chests designed to resemble small rowboats with rowboat shaped beds. Two large beds made of actual unfinished tree branches with pink bedspreads fill another room. The living room features a giant green semi-circular sofa, and a stone wall fireplace. A red colored room connected directly to the living room by a short hallway, with no doors, has a pair of pullout couches rather than actual beds. New this season is a Spa room complete with a massage table, two-person sauna and lounge. The spa room would be featured in numerous subsequent seasons. Outside, there is a hot tub and pool, a billiards table and lounge area. The lounge area features a fire pit and heated lamps. Along with work-out equipment, there are lawn chairs to lay out in the sun. The outside also includes the washing machine and clothes dryer, both of which are covered overhead.

=== Prizes ===
The HouseGuests compete for a grand prize of $500,000 and a runner-up prize of $50,000.

In addition to the grand prize and the runner-up prize, various smaller prizes were offered throughout the game, a majority during Power of Veto competitions or Luxury competitions. In week one, during the Power Couple competition "Falling for You"; Jen & Parker won $10,000. During the Power of Veto competition "Color of Veto" on Day 30; Adam won a motorcycle and Ryan won $10,000. On Day 43 during a Luxury competition, Chelsia, Joshuah, Sharon and Sheila won an advanced screening of the Columbia Pictures film 21. On Day 45, Chelsia won a $21,000 VIP trip to Las Vegas before the screening of the film 21, in which her popcorn bucket had a golden ticket for the prize. On Day 44, when Big Brother 8 contestant "Evel Dick" Donato returned to the Big Brother House to host the Power of Veto competition "Club Evel", if a player scored more than Dick's score of 33 from last season, he or she would have also won a classic Gibson Les Paul guitar and amplifier. Since no one beat his score, Dick won the guitar for himself. During the second Luxury competition of the season on Day 71, Ryan and Sharon won an in-house screening of the 20th Century Fox film What Happens in Vegas, a VIP experience that includes a shopping spree and tickets to the May 1 premiere of the film in Hollywood, and a chance to meet the cast at an after party.

The America's fan vote of America's Favorite Juror first seen in the All-stars season returned after a one-season hiatus, where the Jury of Seven compete in a public vote for a $25,000 prize to be awarded in the finale, which James won.

== Broadcast ==
On December 3, 2007, CBS announced Big Brother would return on February 12, 2008 with three episodes airing on Sundays, Tuesdays and Wednesdays. This was a change from the previous season, which had aired on Thursdays instead of Wednesdays. The Wednesday episode, which aired at 8 pm Eastern Time, featured the live eviction and subsequent Head of Household competition taking place. During the live eviction, the show was hosted by Julie Chen. The Sunday episode, which aired at 8 pm Eastern Time, featured the food competition and nomination ceremony, as well as some highlights from the previous days. The Tuesday episode, which aired at 9 pm Eastern Time featured the Power of Veto competition and the Power of Veto ceremony, along with more highlights of recent events in the game. Some changes to the scheduling format were made. The first eviction, for example, occurred on the second episode of the season.

Both Showtime and CBS announced on January 8, 2008 that Big Brother: After Dark would also return and air seven nights a week during the hours of 12 am and end at 3 am ET. The show served as a live feed into the house, and was edited only for slanderous statements and music copyrights. On February 11, 2008 CBS announced that the live Internet feeds would return for the season with certain events in the House being blocked out to preserve drama of the television broadcasts. The Internet talk show House Calls: The Big Brother Talk Show would also return with host Gretchen Massey. A new feature for Big Brother 9 was the addition of watching the live Internet feeds and new episode of Big Brother live on MediaFLO enabled cell phones. Big Brother 9 was broadcast on television in the United Kingdom, airing on E4 with two one-hour episodes on Thursday nights and one one-hour episode on Tuesday nights, the first episode was shown on February 14 with the finale shown on April 29, 2008.

== Reception ==
=== Ratings ===
Big Brother 9 airs three episodes a week, with shows airing Sundays at 8 p.m. (EST), Tuesdays 9 p.m., and Wednesdays 8 p.m. The live eviction show was moved to Wednesdays due to Survivor: Micronesia airing Thursdays 8 p.m. This is the first season of Big Brother to air during an official television season, and the second to air concurrently with a season of Survivor. Big Brother 9 is also competing with Fox's American Idol on Wednesdays. The first episode of Big Brother 9 premiered on February 12, 2008 with 7.33 million viewers (4.6/7 viewing audience), down from last summer's 4.8/9 (7.4 million viewers) launch.

=== U.S. viewing figures ===
This is ratings information for the season. "Rating" is the estimated percentage of all televisions tuned to the show, and "share" is the percentage of all televisions in use that are tuned in. "Overnight Viewers" is the estimated number viewers that watched a program either while it was broadcast or watched via DVR on the same day the program was broadcast. "Live+7 Viewers" is the estimated number of viewers that watched a program while it was broadcast or via DVR within 7 days of original broadcast.. "Increase over Live" is the percentage of increase between the number of viewers who watched a program "Live" versus "Live+7".

Unless otherwise cited, the overnight rating and share information comes from Zap2It and viewer and ranking information comes from CalendarLive. The following week, the numbers are updated with the final Nielsen numbers from TVWeek.com. DVR information is from TV by the Numbers.

==== Seasonal ranking ====
Based on average total viewers per episode of Big Brother 9 on CBS:

Program	Season Premiere		Season Finale		TV Season	Timeslot	Rank	Viewers (in millions)
Program	Date	Viewers (in millions)	Date	Viewers (in millions)	TV Season	Timeslot	Rank	Viewers (in millions)
Big Brother 9	February 12, 2008	7.33	April 27, 2008	6.65	2007–2008	Tuesday 9:00 pm (Power of Veto)	#112	6.47
Big Brother 9	February 12, 2008	7.33	April 27, 2008	6.65	2007–2008	Wednesday 8:00 pm (Live Eviction)	#127	6.11
Big Brother 9	February 12, 2008	7.33	April 27, 2008	6.65	2007–2008	Sunday 8:00 pm (Nominations Ceremony)	#99	6.88

- Season performance is through 4/20/08.

==== Weekly ratings ====
No.	Air Date	Timeslot (EST)	Season	Rating	Share	18–49 (Rating/Share)	Overnight Viewers (m)	Live+7 Viewers (m)	Increase over Live (%)
1	February 12, 2008	9:00 pm	2007–2008	4.6	7	2.7/6	7.33	7.47	25.0%
2	February 13, 2008	8:00 pm	2007–2008	3.8	6	2.1/6	5.87	6.35	31.2%
3	February 17, 2008	8:00 pm	2007–2008	4.1	6	2.2/6	6.73	7.06	22.6%
4	February 19, 2008	9:00 pm	2007–2008	3.6	6	2.0/5	5.42	6.01	26.8%
5	February 20, 2008	8:00 pm	2007–2008	3.5	6	1.9/5	5.24	5.80	29.3%
6	February 24, 2008	8:00 pm	2007–2008	3.6	6	2.2/5	5.72	6.18	30.2%
7	February 26, 2008	9:00 pm	2007–2008	4.4	7	2.6/6	6.74	7.20	20.9%
8	February 27, 2008	8:00 pm	2007–2008	3.5	6	2.1/5	5.56	5.83	32.4%
9	March 2, 2008	8:00 pm	2007–2008	3.9	6	2.3/6	6.17	6.61	25.3%
10	March 4, 2008	9:00 pm	2007–2008	4.3	7	2.5/6	6.67	6.65	25.6%
11	March 5, 2008	8:00 pm	2007–2008	3.8	6	2.0/5	5.69	6.02	27.5%
12	March 9, 2008	8:00 pm	2007–2008	4.2	7	2.2/6	6.48	6.78	23.1%
13	March 11, 2008	9:00 pm	2007–2008	3.5	6	2.1/5	5.92	6.39	24%
14	March 12, 2008	8:00 pm	2007–2008	3.5	6	1.9/5	5.44	5.75	28%
15	March 16, 2008	8:00 pm	2007–2008	4.1	7	2.3/6	6.25	6.62	24.3%
16	March 18, 2008	9:00 pm	2007–2008	3.5	5	2.0/5	5.48	5.79	21.6%
17	March 19, 2008	9:00 pm NCAA	2007–2008	4.3	7	2.4/6	6.73	6.95	22.8%
18	March 23, 2008	8:00 pm NCAA	2007–2008	4.0	7	2.1/5	6.38	n/a	n/a
19	March 25, 2008	9:00 pm	2007–2008	3.8	6	2.2/5	5.95	6.30	25.3%
20	March 26, 2008	8:00 pm	2007–2008	3.9	7	2.1/6	6.04	6.21	24.7%
21	March 30, 2008	8:30 pm NCAA	2007–2008	4.8	7	2.6/6	7.47	7.70	15%
22	April 1, 2008	9:00 pm	2007–2008	4.1	6	2.4/6	6.42	6.52	22.7%
23	April 2, 2008	8:00 pm	2007–2008	4.0	6	2.2/7	6.04	6.21	26.0%
24	April 6, 2008	8:00 pm	2007–2008	4.0	7	2.2/6	6.53	6.54	22.3%
25	April 8, 2008	9:00 pm	2007–2008	4.2	6	2.4/6	6.30	6.50	19.1%
26	April 9, 2008	8:00 pm	2007–2008	4.0	7	2.1/6	6.05	6.04	19.4%
27	April 13, 2008	8:44 pm Masters	2007–2008	5.7	9	2.7/6	9.02	n/a	n/a
28	April 15, 2008	9:00 pm	2007–2008	4.3	6	2.4/6	6.47	6.54	22.3%
29	April 16, 2008	8:00 pm	2007–2008	4.1	7	2.3/7	6.14	6.42	24.7%
30	April 20, 2008	8:00 pm	2007–2008	4.4	8	2.3/6	6.49	6.65	25.2%
31	April 22, 2008	9:00 pm	2007–2008	4.4	7	2.4/6	6.74		
32	April 23, 2008	8:00 pm	2007–2008	4.4	7	2.3/7	6.7		
33	April 27, 2008	8:00 pm	2007–2008	4.2	7	2.3/6	6.65		

- "n/a" = No information available.

Delays because of CBS Sports:

- NCAA Men's Division I Basketball Tournament airing changes:
  - March 19 eviction episode aired at 9:00 pm (Survivor: Micronesia aired at 8:00 pm).
  - March 23 and 30 nomination episodes were delayed from its normal start time.
- The Masters
  - April 13 nomination episode was delayed from its normal start time.

=== UK television ratings ===
This is ratings information for the season that broadcasts in the United Kingdom on E4. Ratings below are overnight figures from Channel4Sales

No.	US Air Date	UK Air Date	Timeslot	Viewers
1	February 12, 2008	February 14, 2008	9:00 pm	326,000
2	February 13, 2008	February 14, 2008	10:00 pm	302,200
3	February 17, 2008	February 19, 2008	9:00 pm	137,100
4	February 19, 2008	February 21, 2008	9:00 pm	181,900
5	February 20, 2008	February 21, 2008	10:00 pm	150,300
6	February 24, 2008	February 26, 2008	9:00 pm	113,800
7	February 26, 2008	February 28, 2008	9:00 pm	194,600
8	February 27, 2008	February 28, 2008	10:00 pm	161,000
9	March 2, 2008	March 4, 2008	9:00 pm	138,400
10	March 4, 2008	March 6, 2008	9:00 pm	87,500
11	March 5, 2008	March 6, 2008	10:00 pm	93,100
12	March 9, 2008	March 11, 2008	9:00 pm	137,500
13	March 11, 2008	March 13, 2008	9:00 pm	154,700
14	March 12, 2008	March 13, 2008	10:00 pm	144,400
15	March 16, 2008	March 18, 2008	9:00 pm	150,000
16	March 18, 2008	March 20, 2008	9:00 pm	166,400
17	March 19, 2008	March 20, 2008	10:00 pm	124,600
18	March 23, 2008	March 25, 2008	9:00 pm	142,000
19	March 25, 2008	March 27, 2008	9:00 pm	177,400
20	March 26, 2008	March 27, 2008	10:00 pm	134,800
21	March 30, 2008	April 1, 2008	9:00 pm	153,800
22	April 1, 2008	April 3, 2008	9:00 pm	96,200
23	April 2, 2008	April 3, 2008	10:00 pm	94,100
24	April 6, 2008	April 8, 2008	9:00 pm	98,800
25	April 8, 2008	April 10, 2008	9:00 pm	140,700
26	April 9, 2008	April 10, 2008	10:00 pm	122,300
27	April 13, 2008	April 15, 2008	9:00 pm	149,700
28	April 15, 2008	April 17, 2008	9:00 pm	115,100
29	April 16, 2008	April 17, 2008	10:00 pm	109,000
30	April 20, 2008	April 22, 2008	9:00 pm	79,000
31	April 22, 2008	April 24, 2008	9:00 pm	89,700
32	April 23, 2008	April 24, 2008	10:00 pm	62,200
33	April 27, 2008	April 29, 2008	9:00 pm	107,600

=== Critical response ===
Autism United, a national autism group, demanded an apology from CBS over controversial remarks made by HouseGuest Adam Jasinski. During the second episode, Adam stated he worked for an autism foundation and would spend his winnings on a hair salon for people with developmental disabilities "so retards can get together and get their hair done". When Sheila confronted him over his highly offensive remarks, Adam responded by saying "[he] can call them whatever [he] want because [he] work[s] with them all day". John Gilmore (the executive director of Autism United) demanded action to be taken in a letter to Sumner Redstone, Chairman of CBS Corporation, after the Wednesday episode. Gilmore called for the show to be canceled and claimed that the network chose to air the segment for their own personal goals. The organization also contacted several of their advertisers over the issue, including Lowe's, Campbell's Soup, Claritin, Geico, McDonald's and Taco Bell. Autism United are also calling for an investigation into Adam and the foundation he works for. The organization, United Autism Foundation, claims to be a 501 c3 charity (deductions made to the organization would be considered tax deductible under current IRS regulations). The website for United Autism Foundation issued an apology regarding Adam's behavior in the house and stated he will no longer be working for the company after it ends. After winning the show on April 27, 2008, Adam declared he would donate $100,000 to Autism United.

On Day 31, Matt used a racial slur when referring to another (white) HouseGuest. The incident in question was aired on both the live Internet feeds and the spin-off show Big Brother: After Dark on Showtime 2.

On Day 70, there was a controversial Head of Household competition where the HouseGuests were to determine if certain statements were "fact" or "fiction." Many fans of the show, including House Calls co-host Dick Donato, were displeased with the final "fact or fiction" statement, which dealt with how many preexisting relationships there were in the house. The correct answer was three, which counted two relationships between HouseGuests (Jacob & Sharon and Jen & Ryan) and also the relationships between the guinea pigs. Some fans considered this question unfair. Sharon missed the question, leading to her losing the HoH competition and ultimately being evicted.

On October 19, 2009, Adam was arrested, and charged by the DEA in North Reading, MA for possession of 2,000 oxycodone pills with intent to distribute. Jasinski allegedly admitted funding his illegal venture with his $500,000 winnings from the show. He faces a maximum of 20 years in prison and a $1 million fine. Big Brother finalist Sheila Kennedy, who was part of the jury and voted for Adam to win the $500,000 grand prize, stated she felt betrayed by him for using his prize money to fund a drug ring, due to his promise to donate part of it to the autism foundation. HouseGuest Allison said, "I hope Adam gets the maximum [jail] time he deserves because this is terrible."
