= Adam Jasinski =

American television personality

- Born: April 30, 1978 (age 48); Cherry Hill, New Jersey, U.S.
- Television: Big Brother 9 (winner)
- Website: adamjasinski.org

Adam Jasinski (born April 30, 1978) is the winner of the American series Big Brother 9. Jasinski is a public relations manager.

Jasinski was born and raised in Cherry Hill, New Jersey and attended Cherry Hill High School West. He has a master's degree in fashion design and marketing, and has attended Parson's School of Design in New York City, Camden County College in New Jersey, and Fashion Art Italy in Prato-Florence Italy.

== Big Brother 9 ==
On Big Brother, Jasinski was paired with Sheila Kennedy. Jasinski won part two of the three-part final "Head of Household" competition. At the finale, Jasinski became the winner of Big Brother 9 by a vote of 6–1, defeating fellow houseguest Ryan Quicksall and earning the $500,000 prize. Jasinski received votes from Matt McDonald, Chelsia Hart, James Zinkand, Natalie Cunial, Sharon Obermueller, and Sheila Kennedy. Jasinski only lost the vote of Joshuah Welch. Afterwards, Jasinski said "If only if they knew how easy it was to win it all! I would love to do it all over again and really share with the diary room and America my strategy. I was very skeptical, therefore, held back from everyone watching what I was truly up to."

== Criminal activity ==
Jasinski was arrested on October 19, 2009, and was charged by the Drug Enforcement Administration (DEA), in North Reading, MA for possession of 2,000 oxycodone pills with intent to distribute. Jasinski admitted to funding his illegal venture with the $500,000 winnings from the show, and to buying and reselling oxycodone pills for several months. Jasinski faced a maximum of 20 years in prison and a $1 million fine.

On October 4, 2010, Jasinski appeared in U.S. District Court in Boston, Massachusetts and pleaded guilty to charges of possession with intent to distribute Oxycodone and failure to file a tax return for the year he won the $500,000 prize on Big Brother. Jasinski was remanded to custody. In what has been described as an ironic twist, Jasinski's lawyer said she planned to recommend a sentence of house arrest.

Jasinski was sentenced in January 2011 to four years in federal prison for the drug charge and tax evasion. The sentence was light in comparison to the 20 years he was facing. Jasinski claimed to be suffering from a drug addiction and bipolar disorder.

== Professional life ==
After getting clean, Jasinski became an addiction recovery consultant and professional interventionist in the fields of mental health and substance abuse.

Jasinski released a book titled My Kid's On Drugs, Now What? which is a resource for parents on how to guide their child down the path of long-term sobriety after treatment.

Preceded by Dick Donato	Winner of Big Brother; Season 9	Succeeded by Dan Gheesling
