= Big Brother 8 (American season) =

Coordinates: 34°8′40.12″N 118°23′20.71″W

Big Brother
- Season 8
- Big Brother 8 logo
- Hosted by: Julie Chen
- No. of days: 81
- No. of houseguests: 14
- Winner: Dick Donato
- Runner-up: Daniele Donato
- America's Player: Eric Stein
- Companion shows: House Calls; Big Brother: After Dark
- No. of episodes: 33

Release
- Original network: CBS
- Original release: July 5 – September 18, 2007

Additional information
- Filming dates: June 30 – September 18, 2007

Season chronology
- ← Previous; Season 7 Next → Season 9

Big Brother 8 is the eighth season of the American reality television series Big Brother It is based upon the Netherlands series of the same name, which gained notoriety in 1999 and 2000. The season premiered on CBS on July 5, 2007 and lasted eleven weeks until the live finale on September 18, 2007. The eighth season saw little to no change in ratings. The season premiered to 7.40 million viewers, the lowest premiere numbers for any season at the time. The season finale had 8.51 million viewers, making it the second lowest rated finale at the time. In total, the series averaged 7.52 million viewers, only 0.4 behind the previous edition. Big Brother 8 featured 14 HouseGuests, the same amount that was featured in the previous season. The series ended after 81 days, in which HouseGuest Dick Donato was crowned the winner, and his daughter Daniele Donato the runner-up.

== Format ==
The format remains largely unchanged from previous seasons. HouseGuests are sequestered in the Big Brother House with no contact to or from the outside world. Each week, the HouseGuests take part in several compulsory challenges that determine who will win food, luxuries, and power in the House. The winner of the weekly Head of Household competition is immune from nominations and must nominate two fellow HouseGuests for eviction. After a HouseGuest becomes Head of Household, he or she is ineligible to take part in the next Head of Household competition. HouseGuests also take part in competitions to earn food for the week. The losing team will be forced to eat Big Brother Slop for the week. This is the second season to feature Slop as the punishment food, as it was originally peanut butter and jelly. The winner of the Power of Veto competition wins the right to save one of the nominated HouseGuests from eviction. If the Veto winner exercises the power, the Head of Household must then nominate another HouseGuest for eviction.

On eviction night, all HouseGuests except for the Head of Household and the two nominees vote to evict one of the two nominees. This compulsory vote is conducted in the privacy of the Diary Room by the host Julie Chen. In the event of a tie, the Head of Household must cast the deciding vote, announcing it in front of the other HouseGuests. Unlike other versions of Big Brother, the HouseGuests may discuss the nomination and eviction process openly and freely. The nominee with the greater number of votes will be evicted from the House on the live Thursday broadcast, exiting to an adjacent studio to be interviewed by Chen. HouseGuests may voluntarily leave the House at any time and those who break the rules may be expelled from the house by Big Brother. The final seven HouseGuests evicted during the season will vote for the winner on the season finale. These "Jury Members" will be sequestered in a separate house and will not be allowed to watch the show except for competitions and ceremonies that include all of the remaining HouseGuests. The jury members will not be shown any Diary Room interviews or any footage that include strategy or details regarding nominations.

This season featured numerous changes to the twist of the series. The main twists this season saw three sets of enemies entering the house together. This twist did not impact the main format, however, and HouseGuests were free to work with or against each other. Another twist this season saw one HouseGuest being "America's Player", and this HouseGuest was required to perform tasks for America. This allowed the viewers to also choose who this HouseGuest should target for eviction, as well as evict the HouseGuest of their choice. For the first Head of Household competition, Dick, Dustin, and Jessica were unable to compete, and were thus immune from the first eviction. This season also saw a Double Eviction week occur, making it the second season to feature this twist.

== HouseGuests ==
The cast of the eighth season of Big Brother. Top: Kail, Mike, Zach and Joe Middle: Jameka, Daniele, Eric, Amber, Dustin, Dick and Nick Bottom: Jessica, Jen and Carol

Name	Age on entry	Occupation	Residence	Result
Dick Donato	44	Bar manager	Los Angeles, California	Winner; Day 81
Daniele Donato	20	Waitress	Huntington Beach, California	Runner-up; Day 81
Zach Swerdzewski	30	Graphic designer	Tallahassee, Florida	Evicted; Day 76
Jameka Cameron	28	School counselor	Waldorf, Maryland	Evicted; Day 74
Eric Stein	27	Talent management assistant	New York, New York	Evicted; Day 69
Jessica Hughbanks	21	College student	Haysville, Kansas	Evicted; Day 69
Amber Siyavus	27	Waitress	Las Vegas, Nevada	Evicted; Day 62
Jen Johnson	23	Nanny	Beverly Hills, California	Evicted; Day 55
Dustin Erikstrup	22	Shoe salesman	Chicago, Illinois	Evicted; Day 48
Kail Harbick	37	Business Owner	McKenzie Bridge, Oregon	Evicted; Day 41
Nick Starcevic	25	Unemployed	Kimball, Minnesota	Evicted; Day 34
Mike Dutz	26	Painting contractor	Three Lakes, Wisconsin	Evicted; Day 27
Joe Barber	23	Receptionist	Chicago, Illinois	Evicted; Day 20
Carol Journey	21	College student	Lawrence, Kansas	Evicted; Day 13

=== Future appearances ===
In 2008, Eric Stein and Jessica Hughbanks returned to host a Head of Household competition for Big Brother 9. During that same season, Dick Donato returned to host a Power of Veto competition. Jen Johnson participated in a food competition for Big Brother 10. Jessica was later a potential HouseGuest for Big Brother 11, but she ultimately did not enter the house. In 2011, Dick and Daniele Donato returned to compete on Big Brother 13 as part of the Dynamic Duos twist. In 2020, Daniele (now as Dani Briones) returned to compete on Big Brother: All-Stars. In 2025, Stein returned to Big Brother as "The Mastermind", the main antagonist of Big Brother 27.

== Summary ==
On Day 1, Dick, Dustin, and Jessica entered the house through the Head of Household room before the others arrived. The eleven remaining HouseGuests then entered the house, unaware of the fact that the three were already present. Shortly after entering the house, the HouseGuests learn that the three are in the house before going outside to compete in their first Head of Household competition. The HouseGuests then competed in the "Mushroom Madness" Head of Household competition. For this competition, HouseGuests paired into teams of two. Due to the uneven number of players, Nick sat out. One HouseGuest, the "sitter", was required to answer questions while their partner spun on an over-sized mushroom. When the sitter answered incorrectly, their partner's mushroom began spinning faster. The final pair remaining was Eric and Kail, meaning one of them would become the new Head of Household. The three upstairs then learned that they were given the option of selecting the first Head of Household; they chose Kail. Due to them being unable to compete, the three HouseGuests upstairs were immune from the first eviction. On Day 3, the HouseGuests competed in the "Butter Me Up" food competition. They were required to pour butter onto their bodies while their teammates attempted to take the butter from their bodies and fill a tub of popcorn; the team with the most pounds of butter was the winner. The competition resulted in Daniele, Eric, Jameka, Jessica, Joe, Nick, and Zach being on slop for the week.

Kail formed an alliance with Mike, Nick, and Zach, which was called the "Mrs. Robinson Alliance". On Day 5, Kail nominated Amber and Carol for eviction, citing their last-place performance in the Head of Household competition as her main reasoning. When picking players for the Power of Veto competition, Daniele, Nick, and Jameka were selected; Jessica was selected to host. On Day 7, HouseGuests competed in the "Hide and Seek Veto" Power of Veto competition. For this competition, HouseGuests entered the house one at a time and hid a Veto box with their name anywhere inside. Once everyone had hid their boxes, they would attempt to find the boxes one at a time. When a HouseGuest found a box, they would bring it outside; the winner was the HouseGuest whose box was not found. Daniele used a pot of slop as her hiding spot and won. Jen began to annoy numerous HouseGuests, leading to her having arguments with Dick and Nick. This led to numerous HouseGuests hoping that Daniele would use the Power of Veto to allow Jen to be nominated. On Day 9, Daniele left the nominations the same. On Day 13, Carol became the first HouseGuest to be evicted from the house in a vote of ten to one.

Following Carol's eviction, HouseGuests competed in the "Majority Rules" Head of Household competition. They were asked a series of questions about which of two HouseGuests would adhere to certain situations. The object was not to base the answer on personal opinions but how they thought the majority would answer. The minority of the voters were eliminated each round; if there was a tie, none of the HouseGuests were eliminated. Jen won. On Day 14, HouseGuests competed in the "Name That Pie" food competition. For this competition, HouseGuests split into two teams and bid on how many bites it would take to identify the two ingredients in a pie. If a player correctly identified the pie, they won a point for the team, but if they were unable to identify the pie, they would win a point for the opposing team; the first team to seven points would win. The competition resulted in Amber, Daniele, Jameka, Jessica, Joe, and Kail being on slop for the week. That same day, Jen nominated Daniele and Dick for eviction, claiming that the two of them were the most negative people in the house. On Day 15, Amber, Mike, and Joe were selected to play for the Power of Veto competition; Dustin was selected to host. Shortly before the competition, Jen made numerous statements to upset Amber, which led to numerous arguments in the house. The HouseGuests then competed in the "Cutthroat Christmas" Power of Veto competition. For this competition, HouseGuests were required to slide a curling stone down an icy path in an attempt to get it closest to the center; the person furthest from the center each round was eliminated. The eliminated HouseGuest from each round earned a prize that could be taken from them by another eliminated HouseGuest. Daniele won the Power of Veto for the second consecutive time. On Day 17, Daniele used the Power of Veto to remove herself from the block, with Jen nominating Joe in her place. Fearing he would nominate her if he won Head of Household, Kail began attempting to get the votes to evict Dick from the house. Despite this, not even Kail's own alliance went along with her plan, thus ending the "Mrs. Robinson" alliance. On Day 20, Joe became the second HouseGuest evicted from the house in a vote of nine to one.

Following Joe's eviction, the HouseGuests competed in the "Getting Schooled" Head of Household competition. HouseGuests were asked true or false questions in the style of classic high school classes such as History and Geography. Providing an incorrect answer resulted in elimination; the last HouseGuest remaining was the winner. Dick won. On Day 21, HouseGuests competed in the "Mission InPastaBowl" food competition. For this competition, HouseGuests paired off to jump into two bowls of giant pasta which contained meatballs, each with different types of food written on them. The pairs had to match a specific "meatball" from tub A and tub B. When the two HouseGuests matched their meatballs, they won that food for the week. When the time ran out, the House would win any food collected in the competition. That day, Dick nominated Jen and Kail for eviction. When picking players for the Power of Veto competition, Jessica, Nick, and Zach were selected to play; Eric was the host. On Day 22, HouseGuests competed in the "Mad Hatter" Power of Veto competition. For this competition, HouseGuests stood on top of a pedestal while balancing a martini glass on their head. The last HouseGuest remaining who had not dropped their cup would be the winner. Jen was the winner. During the competition, Mike attempted to distract Dick as a show of loyalty to Kail and told Dick to nominate him should the Veto be used, as Mike felt it would show the others that he was a loyal person. Dick then deliberately left his pedestal, causing Jen to win. On Day 24, she used the Power of Veto to remove herself from the block, with Mike being nominated in her place. On Day 27, Mike became the third HouseGuest to be evicted from the house in a vote of seven to two.

Following Mike's eviction, HouseGuests competed in the "Eliminator" Head of Household competition. For this competition, HouseGuests were asked questions about the previously evicted HouseGuests. If a HouseGuest answered correctly, they were able to eliminate one HouseGuest from the competition; an incorrect answer resulted in that HouseGuest being eliminated. Dustin was the winner. On Day 28, HouseGuests competed in the "Humpty Scramble" food competition. For this competition, the HouseGuests paired off and had to find a series of colored puzzle pieces that matched their clothing and piece them together to make an egg. The first team that completed their puzzle would win food and put five people on slop. Jameka and Jessica were the winners; they chose to put Dick, Jen, Kail, Nick, and Zach on slop for the week. Later that day, Dustin nominated Jen and Kail for eviction. Shortly following this, Amber, Daniele, Dick, Dustin, Eric, Jameka, and Jessica formed the "Late Night Crew" alliance, with the goal of evicting the other four HouseGuests. When picking players for the Power of Veto competition, Daniele, Jameka, and Jessica were selected; Eric was selected to host. Due to her religious beliefs, Jameka stated that she would take Jen off the block should she win the Power of Veto as Jen had selected her name to compete. On Day 29, HouseGuests competed in the "Vincent Van Veto" Power of Veto competition. For this competition, HouseGuests had to depict common Big Brother phrases in a series of picture puzzles. A correct answer would result in a HouseGuest gaining "Big Brother Bucks", while an incorrect answer would result in elimination. The winner of the competition would be the HouseGuest who had the most "Big Brother Bucks" at the end. Dustin was in position to win but chose to spend many of his bucks on prizes, leading to criticism from other players and leaving Jameka as the winner. On Day 31, Jameka chose to use the Power of Veto to remove Jen from the block, with Nick being nominated in her place. Feeling that Nick had voted for Mike the previous week, the Late Night Crew alliance (with the exception of Daniele) hoped to see Nick go that week. Following more arguments with Dick, Jen and Kail contemplated walking from the game; the two ultimately decided to stay. On Day 34, Nick became the fourth HouseGuest to be evicted from the house in a vote of six to two.

Following Nick's eviction, HouseGuests competed in the "Times Up" endurance Head of Household competition. For this competition, HouseGuests were required to hang upside down on rocking pendulums; when a player fell off of their pendulum, they were eliminated from the competition. HouseGuests were also eliminated if their torso was raised above a bar located on the pendulum. During the competition, a banner flew over the house that referred to Amber and Eric as being "liars". This banner led Daniele to believe that Eric had voted to evict Kail the previous two weeks, and she began turning against him. Daniele was the eventual winner of the Head of Household competition. During the competition, Daniele had promised Kail safety for the week in exchange for dropping from the competition. On Day 35, Daniele chose to nominate Jen and Kail for eviction, with the hopes of backdooring Eric that week. When picking players for the Power of Veto competition, Jameka, Dustin, and Zach were selected to play; Amber was selected to host. On Day 36, HouseGuests competed in "The Numbers Don't Lie" Power of Veto competition. For this competition, the HouseGuests had to bid on how many hours they would be willing to do a task. If a player had the lowest hours, they would be eliminated; putting the highest number resulted in elimination. Jen was the winner. During the competition, Jameka agreed to sit out from the following five Head of Household competitions. On Day 38, Jen chose to use the Power of Veto to remove herself from the block, with Eric being nominated in her place. Despite Daniele and Dick believing they had the votes to evict Eric, the remaining five members of the Late Night Crew decided to turn on them and keep Eric. On Day 41, Kail became the fifth HouseGuest to be evicted from the house in a vote of four to three.

Following Kail's eviction, HouseGuests competed in the "Let's Make a Duel" Head of Household competition. For this competition, HouseGuests faced off two at a time and had to guess which evicted HouseGuest made certain statements in the Diary Room; the winner of each round would select the next two HouseGuests to face off. Jessica was the winner. Following this, Dick engaged in numerous arguments with Amber, Dustin, and Jameka. On Day 42, HouseGuests competed in the "For Those About to Slop" food competition. For this competition, HouseGuests split into two teams and had to smash open guitars in an attempt to find dollar signs; the first team to find twenty would be the winners. The team of Daniele, Dick, Dustin, and Jen were the losers and were placed on slop for the week. During the competition, Dick found a "Slop Pass" and chose to give it to Jen. Later that day, Jessica chose to nominate Daniele and Dick for eviction. Following their nominations, Dick began to verbally harass the entire house in an attempt to make sure the HouseGuests voted to evict him rather than his daughter. When picking players for the Power of Veto competition, Jameka, Dustin, and Zach were selected; Eric was selected to host. On Day 43, HouseGuests competed in the "Shot For Shot" Power of Veto competition. For this competition, HouseGuests attempted to drink numerous drink mixtures, with the HouseGuests earning one croquet shot for each drink they finished. The HouseGuests then attempted to get the highest score in a game of croquet, and the HouseGuest with the most points was the winner. Dick was the winner of the Power of Veto. On Day 45, Dick chose to use the Power of Veto to remove Daniele from the block, with Dustin being nominated as a pawn in her place. Eric, as America's Player, learned that the viewers had voted for Dustin to leave, and he began campaigning against Dustin. This led to Eric and Jessica forming an alliance with Daniele and Dick, with the goal of keeping Dick in the house. On Day 48, Dustin became the sixth HouseGuest to be evicted in a vote of four to two. He became the first member of the Jury of Seven.

Following Dustin's eviction, HouseGuests competed in the "Strange Visitors" Head of Household competition. For this competition, HouseGuests were asked true or false questions about intruders that had entered the house the previous day. Daniele was the winner, making her the first person to hold the title of Head of Household twice this season. On Day 49, HouseGuests competed in the "Slop Pong" food competition. For this competition, the HouseGuests split into two teams of four. The HouseGuests had to throw volleyballs across the backyard in an attempt to score ten points; the first team to do so would win. The team of Amber, Daniele, Jameka, and Jen lost and were placed on slop for the week. Later that day, Daniele nominated Amber and Jameka for eviction. When picking players for the Power of Veto competition, Dick, Jessica, and Zach were selected; Eric was selected to host. Before competing, the HouseGuests learned that the finalists in the competition would receive a special trip outside of the house. On Day 50, HouseGuests competed in the "Big Brother Speedway" Power of Veto competition. For this competition, HouseGuests were required to guess what percentage of viewers made a certain statement, and the HouseGuest who is the farthest away from the correct answer is eliminated each round. Amber and Daniele became the last two remaining in the competition, thus won the special trip outside of the house. Daniele was the winner of the Power of Veto. On Day 52, Daniele chose to use the Power of Veto to remove Amber from the block, and chose to nominate Jen in her place. That night, Amber and Daniele left the house and learned that they would be contestants on the CBS game series Power of 10. Shortly after their departure, HouseGuests Dick and Jen engaged in numerous verbal arguments, then it turned physical when Dick start poking Jen with his lit cigarettes, this causing much controversy outside of the house. Following these events, Jen decided to eat food, thus violating the punishment she accepted in "The Numbers Don't Lie" Power of Veto competition; for this, Jen was given a penalty vote, meaning she automatically had one vote cast against her that week. On Day 55, Jen became the seventh HouseGuest to be evicted from the house in a unanimous vote of six to zero. She became the second member of the Jury of Seven.

Following Jen's eviction, HouseGuests competed in the "Tanks For the Memories" Head of Household competition. For this competition, HouseGuests were asked questions about statements made by the first five evicted HouseGuests from this season; if a HouseGuest answered incorrectly, they were dumped into a tank of water. Jessica was the winner. On Day 56, HouseGuests competed in the "Shop 'til You Drop" luxury competition. For this competition, the HouseGuests competed as men against women, and found letters in the outfits given to them, and were required to take off their clothing and form three words that pertain to the game with these letters. The women were the winners of the competition and won a two-minute shopping spree inside of the house. Later that day, Jessica chose to nominate Amber and Zach for eviction. When picking players for the Power of Veto competition, Daniele, Eric, and Jameka were selected to compete; Dick was selected to host. On Day 57, HouseGuests competed in the "Catscratch Veto" Power of Veto competition. For this competition, HouseGuests were given riddles and had to search the backyard to find the rubber rat with the correct answer on it; the last person to find the correct answer each round is eliminated. Eric was the winner of the Power of Veto. Eric, as America's Player, was informed that he was not permitted to use the Power of Veto, and that nominations were required to stay the same as the viewers did not have time to vote for a decision. On Day 59, Eric officially chose to leave nominations the same. On Day 62, Amber became the eighth HouseGuest to be evicted from the house in a vote of three to one. She became the third member of the Jury of Seven.

Following Amber's eviction, HouseGuests competed in the "Big Brother Tea Party" Head of Household competition. For this competition, HouseGuests were required to walk back and forth transferring cups of tea from a tea pitcher to a jar on the opposite side of the backyard. The first HouseGuest to fill up their jar and claim the ball inside would be the winner of the competition. Zach was the winner. During the competition, Eric won a phone call from home, and chose to give it to Jessica. On Day 63, Zach chose to nominate Jameka and Jessica for eviction. On Day 64, former HouseGuest Janelle Pierzina returned to the house to host "The Janelle-O-Vision" Power of Veto competition. For this competition, HouseGuests had to correctly identify which two HouseGuests' face made a mixed face swirl. The HouseGuest with the most correct answers would win the Power of Veto. Daniele was the winner of the Power of Veto. On Day 66, Daniele chose to leave the nominations the same. Despite being in an alliance and assuring her safety, Daniele and Dick debated turning on Eric and Jessica by evicting her from the house. Just before the eviction, the HouseGuests learned that it would be a Double Eviction night, and that a second HouseGuest would be evicted in a matter of minutes. On Day 69, Jessica became the ninth HouseGuest to be evicted from the house in a vote of two to one. HouseGuests then competed in the "Before or After" Head of Household competition. For this competition, HouseGuests had to determine whether one event in the house occurred before or after, and the HouseGuest with the most points was the winner; Dick was the winner. Following this, Dick chose to nominate Eric and Jameka for eviction. Minutes later, HouseGuests competed in the "Niagara Balls" Power of Veto competition. For this, numerous colored balls fell into the backyard, and the first HouseGuest to collect five green balls would be the winner; Zach was the winner of the Power of Veto. He then chose to leave the nominations intact. Eric then became the tenth HouseGuest to be evicted from the house in a unanimous vote of two to zero. He became the fifth member of the Jury of Seven.

Following Jessica and Eric's evictions, the HouseGuests competed in the "Picture This" Head of Household competition. For this competition, HouseGuests were shown pictures on the Memory Wall from previous competitions throughout the season. They were then asked questions about details from the images, and the HouseGuest with the most correct answers was the winner. Zach was the winner. On Day 70, Zach chose to nominate Daniele and Dick for eviction, with the hopes of evicting one of them. On Day 71, HouseGuests competed in the "Big Brother Decoder" final Power of Veto competition. For this competition, HouseGuests had to match a clue to a HouseGuest's face that interlocked with another HouseGuest's face. Once that is done, the HouseGuests must twist the knob and match the HouseGuest with the corresponding number. The first HouseGuest to correctly label the many seconds they've been in the house would win the Power of Veto. Daniele was the winner, making it her fifth Power of Veto win. This tied her with former HouseGuest Janelle Pierzina seasons 6 and 7: all stars for the most Power of Veto wins in a single season; the two still hold the record. On Day 74, Daniele chose to use the Power of Veto to remove her father from the block, with Jameka being the only HouseGuest eligible to be nominated in his place. Minutes later, Dick cast the sole vote to evict Jameka from the house. She became the sixth member of the Jury of Seven.

Following Jameka's eviction, HouseGuests competed in "The Bunny Hop" endurance first round of the final Head of Household competition. For this competition, HouseGuests had to stand on a pedestal, while holding their key to the house, and jumping over a moving turnstile. The goal was to be the last remaining HouseGuest, and doing so would advance that HouseGuest to the third and final round of the final Head of Household competition. Zach was the winner of this competition. On Day 75, Daniele and Dick competed in the "Chain of Commands" second round of the final Head of Household competition. For this competition, Daniele and Dick had to jump in a tank of water, collect puzzle pieces and place them in the correct order in a series of slots. The puzzle made a path that led from the first Head of Household to the last. Dick was the winner. On Day 76, Dick and Zach faced off in the "Jury Statements" final round of the final Head of Household competition. For this, HouseGuests answered questions based on how they felt the previously evicted Jury members had responded. Dick was the winner of the competition, and immediately chose to evict Zach from the house. This made Daniele and Dick the Final Two. On Day 81, Dick was crowned the winner of Big Brother 8 in a vote of five to two.

== Episodes ==
No. overall	No. in season	Title	Original release date	U.S. viewers (millions)
256	1	"Episode 1"	July 5, 2007	7.40
257	2	"Episode 2"	July 8, 2007	5.85
258	3	"Episode 3"	July 10, 2007	6.81
259	4	"Episode 4"	July 12, 2007	6.00
260	5	"Episode 5"	July 15, 2007	6.31
261	6	"Episode 6"	July 17, 2007	7.02
262	7	"Episode 7"	July 19, 2007	6.98
263	8	"Episode 8"	July 22, 2007	6.30
264	9	"Episode 9"	July 24, 2007	6.85
265	10	"Episode 10"	July 26, 2007	7.08
266	11	"Episode 11"	July 29, 2007	6.17
267	12	"Episode 12"	July 31, 2007	7.12
268	13	"Episode 13"	August 2, 2007	7.09
269	14	"Episode 14"	August 5, 2007	7.52
270	15	"Episode 15"	August 7, 2007	7.21
271	16	"Episode 16"	August 9, 2007	7.80
272	17	"Episode 17"	August 12, 2007	7.52
273	18	"Episode 18"	August 14, 2007	7.56
274	19	"Episode 19"	August 16, 2007	7.51
275	20	"Episode 20"	August 19, 2007	7.38
276	21	"Episode 21"	August 21, 2007	7.30
277	22	"Episode 22"	August 23, 2007	7.78
278	23	"Episode 23"	August 26, 2007	7.41
279	24	"Episode 24"	August 28, 2007	8.14
280	25	"Episode 25"	August 30, 2007	6.21
281	26	"Episode 26"	September 2, 2007	5.73
282	27	"Episode 27"	September 4, 2007	8.00
283	28	"Episode 28"	September 6, 2007	7.96
284	29	"Episode 29"	September 9, 2007	8.28
285	30	"Episode 30"	September 11, 2007	8.09
286	31	"Episode 31"	September 13, 2007	8.89
287	32	"Episode 32"	September 16, 2007	7.08
288	33	"Episode 33"	September 18, 2007	8.67

== Voting history ==
Color key:

Winner
Runner-up
Head of Household
Nominated for eviction
Immune from eviction
Evicted

Voting history (season 8)
	Week 1	Week 2	Week 3	Week 4	Week 5	Week 6	Week 7	Week 8	Week 9		Week 10	Week 11	
	Week 1	Week 2	Week 3	Week 4	Week 5	Week 6	Week 7	Week 8	Day 63	Day 69 (Note: This week was a double eviction week. Following the first eviction, the remaining HouseGuests played a week's worth of games, including Head of Household and veto competitions, and nomination, veto and eviction ceremonies, during the live show, culminating in a second eviction for the week.)	Week 10	Day 76	Finale
Head of Household	Kail	Jen	Dick	Dustin	Daniele	Jessica	Daniele	Jessica	Zach	Dick	Zach	Dick	(None)
Nominations (initial)	Amber; Carol	Daniele; Dick	Jen; Kail	Jen; Kail	Jen; Kail	Daniele; Dick	Amber; Jameka	Amber; Zach	Jameka; Jessica	Eric; Jameka	Daniele; Dick	(None)	(None)
Veto winner	Daniele	Daniele	Jen	Jameka	Jen	Dick	Daniele	Eric	Daniele	Zach	Daniele	(None)	(None)
Nominations (final)	Amber; Carol	Dick; Joe	Kail; Mike	Kail; Nick	Eric; Kail	Dick; Dustin	Jameka; Jen	Amber; Zach	Jameka; Jessica	Eric; Jameka	Daniele; Jameka	Daniele; Zach	(None)
Dick	Carol (Note: Dick, Dustin, and Jessica entered the house following the first Head of Household competition. They were granted immunity for the week because they did not compete for Head of Household.)	Nominated	Head of Household	Nick	Eric	Nominated	Jen	Amber	Jessica	Head of Household	Jameka	Zach (Note: As Head of Household, Dick chose to evict Zach.)	Winner
Daniele	Carol	Joe	Mike	Nick	Head of Household	Dustin	Head of Household	Amber	Jessica	Eric	Nominated	Nominated	Runner-up
Zach	Carol	Joe	Kail	Kail	Eric	Dustin	Jen	Nominated	Head of Household	Eric	Head of Household	Evicted (Day 76)	Dick
Jameka	Carol	Joe	Mike	Nick	Kail	Dick	Nominated	Zach	Nominated	Nominated	Nominated	Evicted (Day 74)	Daniele
Eric	Carol	Joe	Kail	Kail	Nominated	Dustin	Jen	Amber	Jameka	Nominated	Evicted (Day 69)		Dick (Note: As part of America's Player, Eric's vote was determined by an audience vote.)
Jessica	Carol	Joe	Mike	Nick	Kail	Head of Household	Jen	Head of Household	Nominated	Evicted (Day 69)			Dick
Amber	Nominated	Joe	Mike	Nick	Kail	Dick	Jen	Nominated	Evicted (Day 62)				Dick
Jen	Amber	Head of Household	Mike	Nick	Eric	Dustin	Nominated	Evicted (Day 55)					Daniele
Dustin	Carol	Joe	Mike	Head of Household	Kail	Nominated	Evicted (Day 48)						Dick
Kail	Head of Household	Dick	Nominated	Nominated	Nominated	Evicted (Day 41)							
Nick	Carol	Joe	Mike	Nominated	Evicted (Day 34)								
Mike	Carol	Joe	Nominated	Evicted (Day 27)									
Joe	Carol	Nominated	Evicted (Day 20)										
Carol	Nominated	Evicted (Day 13)											
Evicted	Carol; 10 of 11 votes to evict	Joe; 9 of 10 votes to evict	Mike; 7 of 9 votes to evict	Nick; 6 of 8 votes to evict	Kail; 4 of 7 votes to evict	Dustin; 4 of 6 votes to evict	Jen; 6 of 6 votes to evict (Note: Jen was given a penalty vote for eviction after eating normal food while on the mandatory have-not diet.)	Amber; 3 of 4 votes to evict	Jessica; 2 of 3 votes to evict	Eric; 2 of 2 votes to evict	Jameka; Dick's choice to evict	Zach; Dick's choice to evict	Dick; 5 votes to win
Evicted	Carol; 10 of 11 votes to evict	Joe; 9 of 10 votes to evict	Mike; 7 of 9 votes to evict	Nick; 6 of 8 votes to evict	Kail; 4 of 7 votes to evict	Dustin; 4 of 6 votes to evict	Jen; 6 of 6 votes to evict	Amber; 3 of 4 votes to evict	Jessica; 2 of 3 votes to evict	Eric; 2 of 2 votes to evict	Jameka; Dick's choice to evict	Zach; Dick's choice to evict	Daniele; 2 votes to win

== America's Player ==
At the end of each show (starting July 8), Eric was asked to complete a task that America specified by voting on CBS.com or by text messaging. For every five tasks he completed, he was rewarded with $10,000 (USD). Viewers were able to vote on tasks from the end of an episode until midnight Pacific Time. Once Eric received the task, he had to make a meaningful effort to complete the task. In addition, as part of the twist, America voted on behalf of Eric in each Eviction Vote. Eric was a jury member on finale night, and the viewers voted that Dick should receive his vote to win the game.

The title "America's Player" did lead to a bit of confusion, since Canadians were still allowed to vote online. Allison Grodner, the executive producer, told Global TV, "We are certainly not trying to exclude any of our viewers so we will call this...the 'Canadian-American Player'." or as Canadian fans might say, the "Viewer's Player".

=== Tasks overview ===
Every week, Eric was given three tasks he must attempt to complete. He was given the task in the Diary Room shortly after voting ended, which is midnight Pacific Time on nights that CBS airs episodes: Tuesday, Thursday, and Sunday.

Thursday's Task involved the Nominations:

- If Eric had not won the HoH, then America voted for another HouseGuest to be targeted by Eric. If America's choice won HoH, then the next highest vote recipient would be Eric's target. Eric's task was passed if America's choice was nominated at some point during the week (at the Nomination Ceremony or at the Veto Ceremony as the Replacement Nomination).
- If Eric had won the HoH role, America would vote for who he should nominate. America's Nominee would be nominated alongside a second nominee determined by Eric. The task is automatically passed.

Sunday's Task regarded Eric's relationships in the House or were attempts to shake things up in the House. They varied greatly in difficulty and consequences and each task had its own win condition for Eric.

Tuesday's Task regarded the upcoming eviction.

- When Eric was not nominated, then America would vote on behalf of him in the Eviction Vote. His task was to target America's decision and convince other HouseGuests to vote for the nominee America had voted to evict. Eric would pass the task if America's target was evicted.
- When Eric was nominated for eviction, America would task him to convince and flatter a particular HouseGuest to not vote him out. If America's decision voted against the other nominee, then Eric would pass the task.

=== Task results ===
Eric completed 20 out of 28 tasks, earning him a total of $40,000.

Task No.	Date given	Description	Options	America's selection	Result	
1	Sun, Jul 8	It's time for Eric to reveal his soft side by making up a traumatic story about his past. Of all the HouseGuests, who should Eric pour his heart out to?	All other HouseGuests	Kail	Eric blushed up his face and splashed his eyes with eye drops to make it look like he was crying. He told Kail a story about a girl from high school who was anorexic.	Completed
2	Tue, Jul 10	Which of the two nominees do you want America's Player to vote out of the House?	Amber, Carol	Carol	Carol was evicted from the House in a 10–1 vote.	Completed
3	Thu, Jul 12	Of the remaining HouseGuests, who should Eric try to get nominated?	All other HouseGuests	Jessica	While Eric only had to try to campaign against Jessica, he did not do so.	Failed
4	Sun, Jul 15	The HouseGuests each have their quirks, and Eric is about to develop a case of sleepwalking. Into which HouseGuest's bed should he crawl tonight?	All other HouseGuests, except HoH	Joe	Eric did "sleepwalk" into Joe's bed, but it was required that he stay there until Joe kicked him out. Eric did not wait that long.	Failed
5	Tue, Jul 17	Which of the two nominees do you want Eric to get evicted from the House?	Dick, Joe	Joe	Joe was evicted from the House in a 9–1 vote.	Completed
6	Thu, Jul 19	Eric may not be Head of Household, but he can still influence the nominations. Who should Eric get nominated?	All other HouseGuests	Jen	Jen was nominated for eviction by the HoH.	Completed
7	Sun, Jul 22	Eric needs to instigate some drama in the House. This week, he's a secret vandal. Whose personal property should he covertly target?	All other HouseGuests	Jen	Eric squirted mustard on one of Jen's shirts.	Completed
8	Tue, Jul 24	Which of the two nominees do you want Eric to get evicted from the House?	Kail, Mike	Kail	Eric voted for Kail, but Mike was evicted in a 7–2 vote.	Failed
9	Thu, Jul 26	Which HouseGuest do you want Eric to get nominated?	All other HouseGuests	Jen	Jen was nominated for eviction by the HoH.	Completed
10	Sun, Jul 29	Which catchphrase should Eric start in the House?	"Sweet Chicken" "Booyakah" "I'd do that for a dollar!"	"I'd do that for a dollar!"	Three other HouseGuests said the catchphrase over the subsequent five days.	Completed
11	Tue, Jul 31	Which of the two nominees do you want Eric to get evicted from the House?	Kail, Nick	Kail	Eric voted for Kail, but Nick was evicted in a 6–2 vote.	Failed
12	Thu, Aug 2	Which HouseGuest do you want Eric to get nominated?	All other HouseGuests	Jen	Jen was nominated by the HoH.	Completed
13	Sun, Aug 5	Eric is going to promise another HouseGuest that he will go to the Final Two with them. It's up to Eric, though, whether this promise is the truth or a lie. To whom do you want Eric to make this promise?	All other HouseGuests	Jessica	Eric had already promised to take Jessica to the end before the task was assigned, but he did it again once it became an official task.	Completed
14	Tue, Aug 7	Which HouseGuest should Eric flatter incessantly in order to ensure his safety?	All other HouseGuests (except Daniele and Kail)	Dick	Dick voted to evict Eric. No footage of Eric receiving this task, or making any attempt to complete it, was shown during the eviction episode on Thursday, August 9.	Failed
15	Thu, Aug 9	Which HouseGuest do you want Eric to get nominated?	All other HouseGuests	Dustin	Dustin was nominated by the HoH.	Completed
16	Sun, Aug 12	To which HouseGuest should Eric give the silent treatment?	All other HouseGuests	Jessica	Eric was unable to give Jessica the silent treatment.	Failed
17	Tue, Aug 14	Which one of the two nominees do you want Eric to get evicted from the House?	Dick, Dustin	Dustin	Dustin was evicted from the house in a 4–2 vote.	Completed
18	Thu, Aug 16	Which HouseGuest do you want Eric to get nominated?	All other HouseGuests	Amber	Amber was nominated by the HoH.	Completed
19	Sun, Aug 19	It's time for America's Player to share a special moment with another HouseGuest. To whom should Eric give this childhood woobie?	All other HouseGuests	Jessica	Eric gave Jessica a small stuffed animal.	Completed
20	Tue, Aug 21	Which one of the two nominees should Eric get evicted?	Jameka, Jen	Jen	Jen was evicted from the House in a unanimous 6–0 vote.	Completed
21	Thu, Aug 23	Which HouseGuest do you want Eric to get nominated?	All other HouseGuests	Amber	Amber was nominated by the HoH.	Completed
22	Sun, Aug 26	Which HouseGuest do you want Eric to kiss?	All other HouseGuests	Jessica	Eric had already kissed Jessica before the task was assigned, but he did it again once it became an official task.	Completed
23	Tue, Aug 28	Which one of the two nominees should Eric get evicted?	Amber, Zach	Amber	Amber was evicted from the House in a 3–1 vote.	Completed
24	Thu, Aug 30	Which HouseGuest do you want Eric to get nominated?	All other HouseGuests	Jameka	Jameka was nominated by the HoH.	Completed
25	Sun, Sep 2	Which HouseGuest should Eric mimic?	All other HouseGuests	Dick	Eric had to mimic Dick in three different situations before the veto ceremony took place; he pretended to smoke Dick's cigarettes, sat down beside him and followed his actions, and threw cereal around like Dick.	Completed
26	Tue, Sep 4	Which one of the two nominees should Eric get evicted?	Jameka, Jessica	Jameka	Eric voted for Jameka, but Jessica was evicted in a 2–1 vote.	Failed
27	Thu, Sep 6	Which HouseGuest do you want Eric to get nominated?	All other HouseGuests	Daniele	Daniele was not nominated for eviction by the HoH.	Failed
28	Thu, Sep 13	Who do you want Eric to campaign and vote for to win Big Brother 8?	Daniele, Dick	Dick	Dick won the season in a 5–2 vote.	Completed

== Production ==
=== Development ===
The season was first announced on February 1, 2007. That same day, it was confirmed that Arnold Shapiro had stepped down as producer, opting instead to appear as the executive consultant. On the decision, Shapiro stated he was "gratified that (he and Allison) were able to successfully ‘re-invent’ BB2 and turn the series into an annual summer hit." Grodner later stated "We consider ‘All-Stars’ sort of the end of an era, and now we’re getting a chance to start once again with a fresh cast and new twists." Rich Meehan replaced Shapiro as the executive producer. Casting for the season concluded on May 5, 2007. Grodner later promised fans of the series that Big Brother 8 would be more interactive, commenting "It's not just about sitting down and watching television [...] We're a summer event that's always with you. I don't think any other show has that sort of reach." Ghen Maynard of CBS later stated "This year, there are going to be some new things that make the show even more ubiquitous and interactive [...] there will be something die-hard fans will love. It will give them the opportunity to participate even more than they have in the past." Shortly before the premiere, a cast list began circulating the internet; casting director Robyn Kass, however, denied that this was the real cast. The cast was revealed on June 28, 2007.

=== House ===
House pictures were released on June 27, 2007. The house has an Alice in Wonderland theme and contains an oversized bedroom and a small bedroom. The small bedroom features a very small doorway and five beds which are only five feet long, while the oversized bedroom features shoulder-height beds and enormous drawers which need a ladder to reach. A third bedroom is decorated all in red, and two large, round beds sit in the center of the room. The walkway to the Head of Household room is a modernist inspired enchanted forest. The living room features several colored mirrors, varying in shape and size. The living room is connected to the kitchen, which is connected to the HoH stairway and a hallway. There is one door in the hallway, which features a gym available to the HouseGuests. The hallway then leads to the bathroom, which features a lavish blue wall, and a shower which features a lion-shaped water spout. The backyard contains animal-shaped topiaries, flowers, a swimming pool, and a spinning teacup, which the HouseGuests can sit in. As revealed during the "Majority Rules" competition, the teacup holds nine gallons of water, which the HouseGuests place their feet in. Workout equipment can also be found outside. There are also multiple lawn chairs that the HouseGuests may use to lay out in the sun. There is also a large couch under a roof by the sliding glass door that the HouseGuests may use in case of rain.

=== Prizes ===
The 14 HouseGuests this season were competing for the main prize of $500,000, where the Jury of Seven were the sole determinant of the grand prize.

Other than the main prize, various luxuries and prizes were given out throughout the season. In week two, during the second Power of Veto competition, Dick won a plasma TV. On Day 23, during the fourth Power of Veto competition, Dustin won $5,000 and a trip for two to Barbados. On Day 30, during the fifth Power of Veto competition, a prize of $10,000 was offered to anyone who would step down from the competition, but no one did. On Day 44, during the sixth Power of Veto competition, Daniele and Amber won a secret trip outside the House, which was later revealed to them that it was to New York City to compete on the CBS game show Power of 10; Amber won $1,000, and Daniele did not win any money. On Day 50, during the first Luxury competition, Amber, Daniele, Jameka, and Jessica won a two-minute shopping spree of designer clothes inside the House. In the HoH competition on Day 62, a prize was rewarded to whoever could fill a jar the fastest with tea. The prize was a three-minute phone call home. Eric won this prize, but chose to give it to Jessica; she called her brother.

The fan-favorite award first introduced in the last season, America's Favorite Juror (and later America's Favorite HouseGuest beginning season 11), did not appear this season but instead replaced with the America's Player twist.

== Broadcast ==
Big Brother 8 was broadcast on CBS from July 5, 2007 to September 18, 2007. This season lasted 81 days, an increase from the previous season. This season featured no additional changes to the schedule that was used in the previous edition, with episodes airing on Tuesdays, Thursday, and Sunday each week. The Thursday episode, which aired at 8 pm Eastern Time, featured the live eviction and subsequent Head of Household competition taking place. During the live eviction, the show was hosted by Julie Chen. The Sunday episode, which aired at 8 pm Eastern Time, featured the food competition and nomination ceremony, as well as some highlights from the previous days. The Tuesday episode, which aired at 9 pm Eastern Time, featured the Power of Veto competition and the Power of Veto ceremony, along with more highlights of recent events in the game. Some changes to the scheduling format were made. This year Canadian Broadcast network, Global TV, introduced an interactive Two-Screen Solutions game on their website, Big Brother 'In The House', using NanoGaming technology. Viewers were able to make real-time predictions as well as answer trivia and instant recall questions while watching the show. The Big Brother fan with the most points each week won a TV, and the fan with the most points throughout the season won tickets to the wrap party. The contest started on Thursday, July 5, 2007 and ended on Thursday, August 30, 2007.

The website for the series featured a "Love 'Em or Leave 'Em" poll, in which fans could monitor the popularity of the HouseGuests each week. Much like the previous editions, the live feeds were also available again for this season. HouseGuests enter the house a few days before the premiere, and the feeds are not live for the first few days. They later go live after the broadcast of the launch episode. This season saw the return of the spin-off series House Calls: The Big Brother Talk Show. HouseGuest Marcellas Reynolds did not return as co-host, and the series featured a different co-host each week. The web series aired thirty-minute episodes on weeknights, and allowed fans to call in and express their opinions on the events of the game. Evicted HouseGuests were also interviewed on the series following their eviction. This season also introduced the Big Brother: After Dark spin-off series, which aired on Showtime Two nightly from midnight to 3 a.m. Eastern Time. The show served as a live feed into the house, and was edited only for slanderous statements and music copyrights.

== Reception ==
=== Ratings ===
Big Brother 8 aired episodes three times a week, with shows airing Sundays at 8 p.m. (EDT), Tuesdays 9 p.m., and Thursday 8 p.m. The first episode premiered on July 5, 2007 with 7.401 million viewers (4.8/9 viewing audience), down from last year's 5.2/9 launch. The following show on Sunday did much worse in the ratings, scoring a 3.9/7 viewing figure, losing nearly 1 million viewers since the previous episode. The first Tuesday's show, however, was more successful with viewers, managing a 4.5/7 rating. The following Tuesday's show had the same rating. Tuesday shows are typically the highest rated among the three episodes every week, with Thursday in second and Sunday, a competitive night in television, in last among all three recap shows. Sunday, August 5's episode, became the first edition of the season that rated higher than the launch show and the first of the season to receive a 5.0 in preliminary ratings points. On August 23 another record was set: the first episode with 10% of the viewing audience and the first episode to read 5.3 in rating points and 8.1 million viewers, thus becoming the highest rated episode of the season. Another record was broken August 30, being the first episode to read 6.0 in rating points, being the first episode this season to pull 11% of the viewing audience. It was also the first episode to break the 9m viewer mark, with 9.42m viewers.

=== Critical response ===
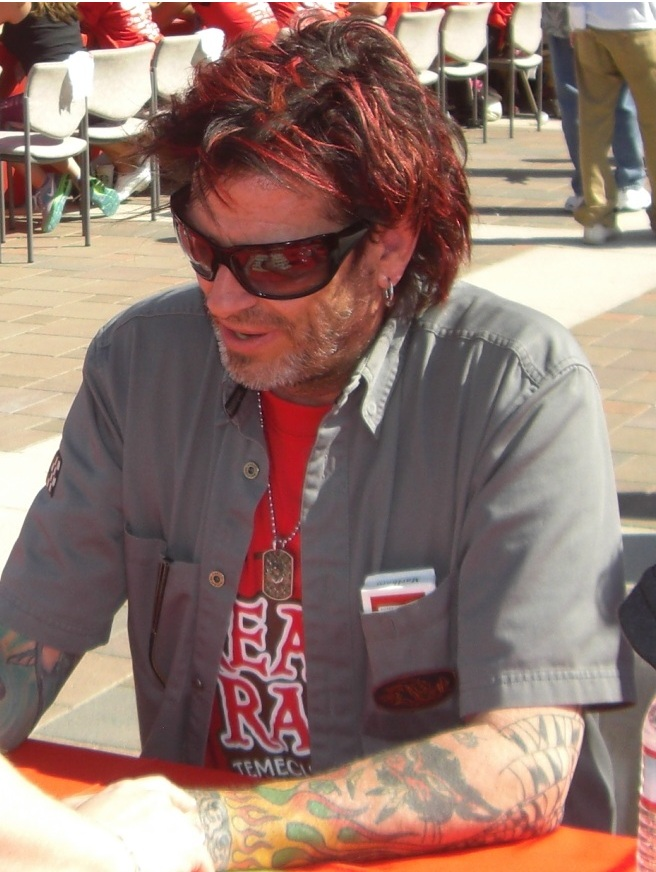
Winner Dick Donato was criticized for his antics towards his fellow HouseGuests.

HouseGuest Richard "Evel Dick" came under some controversy for his loud abusive behavior towards HouseGuests; especially Jen. This culminated in an event in which Dick poured iced tea on Jen's head while she was engaged in an argument with HouseGuests Nick and Dick's daughter Daniele. This led some fans and the National Organization for Women to call for his expulsion from the house.

On Day 52 Jen, who was named as a replacement nominee for Amber, packed and scattered her belongings through the House, destroyed and bleached Dick's cigarettes. Dick, in retaliation, later threw Jen's clothing over the surrounding walls of the Big Brother house. Big Brother later informed Dick they would replace the cigarettes. Jen began to cook food while on a slop restriction Later that night, Jen went outside and ate food while on slop. Big Brother told Jen she would receive a penalty vote, she must be a nominee for the entire week and cannot win HoH or Veto for Week 8 if she survived Week 7. This was found unfair to Jameka, the other Week 7 nominee, and the penalty nomination was removed. Jen would instead receive a penalty eviction vote for Week 7 plus any votes cast against her by her fellow HouseGuests.

Later, Dick lit a cigarette and blew smoke in Jen's direction while she was eating. Jen attempted to grab the cigarette from Dick to which Dick burnt Jen's hand with his cigarette. Jen began to yell that Dick burned her on purpose. This incident ended with Dick yelling at Jen. Jen burst into tears and Jameka pulled Jen away from the confrontation and to the bathroom. Neither Jen nor Dick was expelled from the House and Jen was evicted on Day 55. Jen said to the Associated Press: "I definitely think he should have been kicked out, but obviously he was definitely entertainment for the show, so that's why he was not."

Another HouseGuest, Amber, garnered national attention after making what were considered anti-Semitic statements. Hollywood news conglomeration Defamer criticized Amber's sentiments. Notably, aggregate TMZ reported about Amber's remarks, especially those about being able to recognize a Jew by the size of their nose or their last name. Abraham Foxman, National Director of the Anti-Defamation League told the website:

"It's offensive. It's part of the unintended consequences of the communications revolution. Anybody can say what they do - but reality shows are now giving license to these expressions of anti-Semitism. Now, all of a sudden, the world is privy to their bigotry and it's on national television... then enhanced on YouTube. What they've done is distributed anti-Semitism – which started as a private conversation – and by putting it on a reality TV show broadcast it to the world at large. I want CBS to understand they are facilitating anti-Semitism. They should act responsibly to the community; they are legitimizing bigoted conversation."

This impelled CBS to release a statement about the controversy:

"BIG BROTHER is a reality show about watching a group of people who have no privacy 24/7 - and seeing every moment of their lives. At times, the HouseGuests reveal prejudices and other beliefs that we do not condone. We certainly find the statements made by Amber Siyavus on the live Internet feed to be offensive and they will not be part of any future broadcast on the CBS Television Network. Any views or opinions expressed in personal commentary by a HouseGuest appearing on BIG BROTHER 8, either on any live feed from the House or the broadcast, are those of the individual(s) speaking and do not represent the views or opinions of CBS or the producers of the program."

The Associated Press will decline to interview Amber and Jameka if they are members of the Jury, due to the fact that they are not allowed to ask both contestants about Amber's comments. A CBS spokesperson reported that asking Amber or Jameka about Amber's comments could influence the jury voters and affect the integrity of the game.

Due to the controversy surrounding offensive remarks and controversial behavior made by several HouseGuests, this season CBS did not allow the media or even companion show House Calls: The Big Brother Talk Show to interview evicted HouseGuests who are a part of the jury of seven to vote for the winner of Big Brother 8 beginning with Amber. They were allowed to interview the HouseGuests after Big Brother 8 was over. Big Brother and CBS issued a statement addressing the situation:

We have made jury members of Big Brother available to the press the past few seasons always with the proviso that their questions not inform the ejected HouseGuest of influences outside his or her personal experience in the House. This season several cast members have made either offensive statements or exhibited controversial behavior, we respect journalist interests and rights to pose questions about these statements but believe at the same time doing so could provide information that influences the final vote and potential outcome of this twelve-week competition. For that reason the remaining jurors will not be made available to the media for the duration of the program. They will be made available to the press after the Big Brother finale on September 18.

== See also ==
- Big Brother: After Dark
