= Ellie (film) =

- Directed by: Peter Wittman
- Written by: Glenn Allen Smith
- Produced by: Francine Roudine
- Starring: Sheila Kennedy; Shelley Winters; Edward Albert; Pat Paulsen; George Gobel
- Cinematography: George Tirl
- Music by: Bob Pickering; Charley Pride
- Distributed by: Troma Entertainment
- Release date: 1984
- Running time: 88 minutes
- Language: English

Ellie is a 1984 comedy film directed by Peter Wittman and distributed by Troma Entertainment.

== Premise ==
Set in the Deep South, the film follows Ellie (Sheila Kennedy), who, after her father's murder at the hands of her stepmother and her three lecherous stepbrothers, vows to avenge her father's death using the only weapon she has: her voluptuous body.

== Cast ==
The film also features appearances from as Shelley Winters, George Gobel, Edward Albert and Pat Paulsen.

== Production ==
Sheila Kennedy also appears in another Troma production, The First Turn-On!

== Release ==
The film was released on DVD in a 3-DVD box also containing Preacherman and Hot Summer in Barefoot County. The film, presented as a "rustic revenge comedy", was screened in 2019 in New York for Troma Tuesdays.
