= Dick Donato =

American podcaster

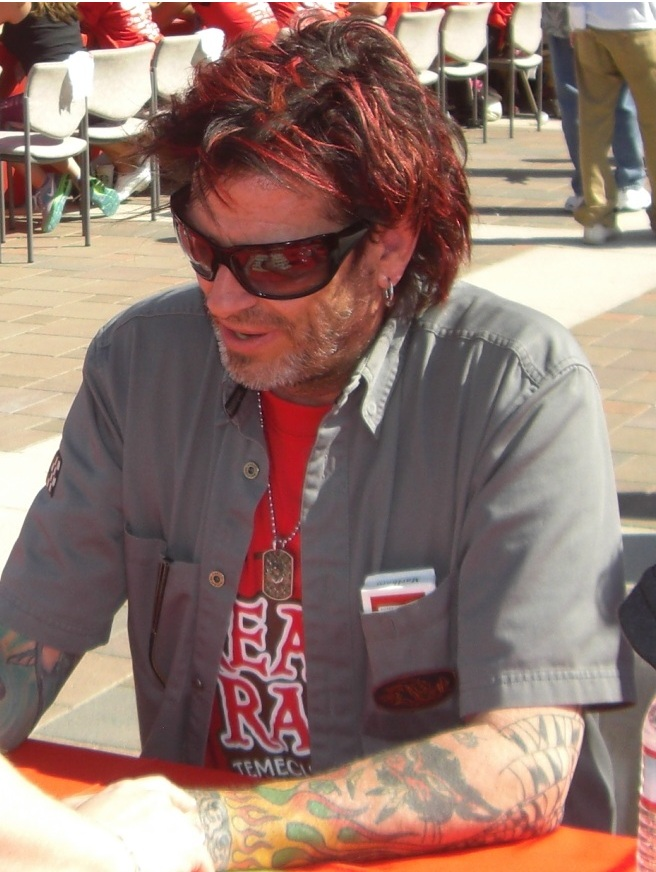
- Donato signing autographs in 2011.
- Born: Richard Louis Donato; June 24, 1963 (age 63); Los Angeles, California, U.S.
- Other names: Evil Dick, Dick, Evel, ED
- Television: Big Brother 8 (winner); Big Brother 13
- Children: 2, including Daniele

Richard Louis Donato (born June 24, 1963) is a bar manager and podcaster from Los Angeles, California, whose nickname is Evil Dick. He was the winner of the reality game show Big Brother 8. He and his daughter, Daniele Donato, are the only family member pair to win the American Big Brother program's top two prizes in the same competition. Dick holds the record as the show's oldest winner (age 44 at the time), and Daniele is the youngest person (having turned 21 during the competition) ever to win one of the American program's top two prizes. Dick returned for season 13 of Big Brother as a team with his daughter Daniele, but departed the show citing "personal reasons" during the first week. In 2014, Donato announced that the reason he departed the show was due to a positive HIV diagnosis.

== Biography ==
Donato was a stand-in for Keith Richards in the 2007 motion picture Pirates of the Caribbean: At World's End. Because of Donato's claims to have met, known, or even dated various celebrities, he has been accused of lying just to drop names. However, Dizzy Reed of the rock band Guns N' Roses says that Donato is not a name dropper, that people drop his name. The nickname "Evel Dick" originated with an email address Donato once made up. Donato is the father of Vincent and Daniele Donato.

== After Big Brother ==
Donato said he planned to use a portion of the $500,000 to pay for his daughter's college education. Although directly splitting prize winnings was banned by contest rules, he could pay for his daughter's education and buy presents. On Wednesday, March 19, 2008, episode of Big Brother 9, Donato revealed that he had taken Daniele to Europe and bought her a red car with his prize money.

Donato was nominated for and won the Golden Realitini for Favorite Reality Performer in the Fox Reality Really Awards for 2007 against Len Goodman, New York, Sanjaya Malakar, Ant (comedian), and Christopher Knight & Adrianne Curry. He was also nominated for Best Winner, Favorite Villain (which he also won), Favorite Potty Mouth, and Best Fight for his confrontation with Jen Johnson. Fox Reality Channel recorded the ceremony on October 2, 2007, and aired it on October 13.

In 2009, TV Guide Named "Evel Dick" Donato on the list of "Evil Reality TV Villains" placing him on the list next to 12 others including Simon Cowell and Gordon Ramsay

In 2011, Donato returned to Big Brother on the thirteenth season of the American Big Brother alongside his daughter despite reports they had not spoken to each other for three years. He left the house on day 6 of the show stating that something bad had happened to someone close to him. It was later revealed that the show's medical staff had discovered that he was HIV positive and provided that information to him in the Diary Room.

Donato was a cast member on Season 5 of Couples Therapy on VH1 with Dr. Jenn Berman. On October 1, 2014, Donato revealed on the show that he has been living with HIV since 2011. He told People magazine he does not know how he contracted the disease, but he suspects that it happened during unprotected sex with a stripper in Las Vegas after a long night of drinking.

Preceded by Mike Malin	Winner of Big Brother; Season 8	Succeeded by Adam Jasinski
