= Sheila Kennedy =

American actress

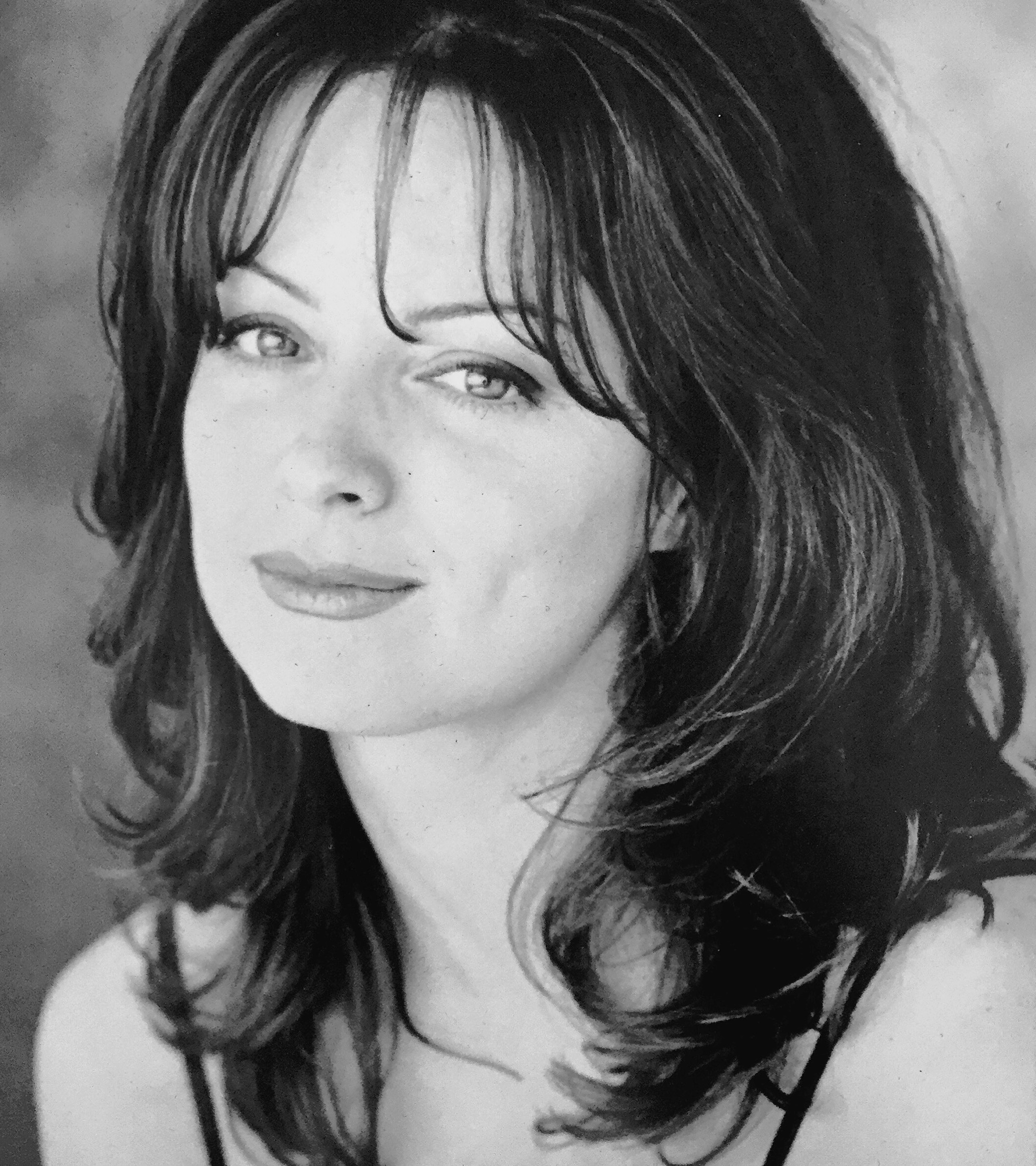
- Born: April 12, 1962 (age 64); Memphis, Tennessee, U.S.
- Television: Big Brother 9
- Children: 1

Sheila Kennedy (born April 12, 1962) is an erotic model and actress who was the December 1981 Penthouse Pet of the Month and the 1983 Pet of the Year.

== Career ==
Kennedy moved into the Penthouse Mansion in New York at the age of 18. She lived there for 10 years and after her appearances in Penthouse magazine as the December 1981 Pet of the Month and later as the 1983 Pet of the Year, Kennedy began an acting career. She appeared mostly in low-budget sex comedies, such as The First Turn-On!, Spring Break, and Ellie, starring alongside Academy Award winner Shelley Winters. Kennedy also was featured briefly in the opening scene of National Lampoon's European Vacation as a game show prize model and appeared as a guest on Late Night with David Letterman.

In the spring of 2008, Kennedy was a houseguest on the American reality show Big Brother 9. She came in 3rd Place and left the house on Day 77, after Ryan Quicksall won the final Head of Household competition and chose to evict her. Kennedy later cohosted House Calls: The Big Brother Talk Show for Big Brother 10 on Wednesdays.

Kennedy completed a memoir titled No One's Pet about her time living at the Penthouse Mansion and her relationship with publisher and magazine founder Bob Guccione. The book is published by Jerrick Media and was released in February 2016.

== Personal life ==
Kennedy has a son. She is a former girlfriend of teen idol Leif Garrett and boxer Ray Mancini, as well as Scott Baio and appeared as herself in one episode of his reality television program Scott Baio Is 45...and Single.

Look Away, a documentary about sexual abuse in the rock music industry features a story by Kennedy in which she recounts being victim of a violent sexual assault by an intoxicated Axl Rose of Guns 'N Roses in the late 1980s. On November 22, 2023, Kennedy sued Axl Rose for sexually assaulting her in 1989. The lawsuit was settled on December 4, 2024.

== See also ==
- Big Brother 9

1970s	Evelyn Treacher	Stephanie McLean	Tina McDowall	Patricia Barrett	Avril Lund
1970s	Anneka Di Lorenzo	Laura Bennett Doone	Victoria Lynn Johnson	Dominique Maure	Cheryl Rixon
1980s	Isabella Ardigo	Danielle Deneux	Corinne Alphen	Sheila Kennedy	Linda Kenton
1980s	None	Cody Carmack	Mindy Farrar	Patty Mullen	Ginger Miller
1990s	Stephanie Page	Simone Brigitte	Jisel	Julie Strain	Sasha Vinni
1990s	Gina LaMarca	Andi Sue Irwin	Elizabeth Ann Hilden	Paige Summers	Nikie St. Gilles
2000s	Juliet Cariaga	Zdeňka Podkapová	Megan Mason	Sunny Leone	Victoria Zdrok
2000s	Martina Warren	Jamie Lynn	Heather Vandeven	Erica Ellyson	Taya Parker
2010s	Taylor Vixen	Nikki Benz	Jenna Rose	Nicole Aniston	Lexi Belle
2010s	Layla Sin	Kenna James	Jenna Sativa	Gina Valentina	Gianna Dior
2020s	Lacy Lennon	Kenzie Anne	Amber Marie	Tahlia Paris	Renee Olstead
2020s	Kassie Wallis	-	-	-	-
