= Big Brother (American TV series) =

Reality competition show

Coordinates: 34°8′40.12″N 118°23′20.71″W

- Also known as: Big Brother US
- Genre: Reality competition
- Based on: Big Brother by John de Mol Jr.
- Presented by: Julie Chen Moonves; Ian O'Malley; Jerry O'Connell
- Starring: Big Brother HouseGuests
- Voices of: Multiple producers; Don Wollman
- Narrated by: Dave Walsh; Philip Proctor; Clayton Halsey
- Theme music composer: Marie Maxwell (season 2–5); John Thomas (season 2–5); David Vanacore; Ken Berry
- Opening theme: "Live" by Jonathan Clarke (2000)
- Country of origin: United States
- Original language: English
- No. of seasons: 28
- No. of episodes: 1,016 (list of episodes)

Production
- Executive producers: Paul Römer (2000); Douglass Ross (2000); Arnold Shapiro (2001–2006); Allison Grodner (2001–); Rich Meehan (2004–)
- Producer: Don Wollman
- Production location: Studio City, California
- Camera setup: Multi-camera
- Running time: 20–23 minutes (2000); 40–120 minutes (since 2000)
- Production companies: Endemol USA (2000–2014); Evolution Media (2000); Orwell Productions (2000); Our House Productions (2001–present); Arnold Shapiro Productions (2001); Shapiro/Grodner Productions (2002–2006); Allison Grodner Productions (2007–2009); Fly on the Wall Entertainment (2010–present); Endemol Shine North America (2015–2023); Banijay Americas (2023–present)

Original release
- Network: CBS
- Release: July 5, 2000 – present

Related
- Companion shows; House Calls; Big Brother: After Dark; Big Brother: Live Chat; Off the Block; Big Brother: Unlocked; Spin-offs; Big Brother: Over the Top; Big Brother: Reindeer Games; Celebrity Big Brother; Adaptation; Big Brother Canada; Related; Gran Hermano; International versions

Big Brother is an American reality competition television show based on the Dutch show of the same name created by producer John de Mol Jr. and Ron Diesel in 1997. The American series launched on July 5, 2000, on CBS and since the ending of the Spanish version in 2022, is the longest-running adaptation in the Big Brother franchise.

The show broadly follows the premise of other versions, in which a group of contestants, known as "HouseGuests", live together in a specially constructed house that is isolated from the outside world as they compete for a cash prize. The HouseGuests are continuously monitored in the house by live television cameras as well as personal audio microphones. While its inaugural season followed the original Dutch format, in which audience voting determined evictees and the eventual winner, the negative critical reception and low viewership resulted in the series being revamped for the second season, which focused on competition and gameplay. Under this revamped format, the HouseGuests compete in challenges to win power and safety before voting to evict each other from the house. The last remaining HouseGuest wins the competition and is awarded a cash prize. The series is named after the fictional totalitarian dictator from George Orwell's 1949 novel Nineteen Eighty-Four.

The show's twenty-eighth season, which included the series' 1,000th episode, premiered on July 9, 2026.

On October 1, 2026, during the live finale for Big Brother 28 host Chen Moonves announced that CBS has renewed the show through a 30th season.

== Format ==
Big Brother is a reality game show in which a group of contestants, known as HouseGuests, live in a custom-built residence—the Big Brother House— under constant video surveillance. While the exact duration varies by season, seasons last approximately three months. HouseGuests are isolated from the outside world, with no contact allowed except for medical emergencies or family crises. The show is often regarded as a social experiment, requiring contestants to navigate relationships and conflicts with people from diverse backgrounds, beliefs, and values.

=== Season 1 ===
The first season mirrored the original Dutch version, focusing on the social experiment aspect with minimal competition. HouseGuests did not compete for power or safety, and the nomination process was not discussed among them. The season received mixed reviews.

==== Challenges ====
Challenges were divided into "food," "tasks," and "live challenges". For most of the food challenges, each HouseGuest was required to wager a certain percentage of their allowance, up to 50%, to complete a certain objective. One competition was the "luxury challenge", where the winner received a golden ticket to the Primetime Emmy Awards.

==== Banishment ====
Every two weeks (later reverting to a weekly process towards the end of the season), HouseGuests secretly nominated two others for eviction in the "Red Room". The two or more HouseGuests with the most nomination votes were then "Marked for Banishment". The public would, through a premium number, vote to banish one of the nominated HouseGuests. On a live results show, the banished HouseGuest would be announced, after which they would immediately leave the house.

==== Final vote ====
When three HouseGuests remained, the public vote decided the winner, who received $500,000, while the runners-up got $100,000 (2nd place) and $50,000 (3rd place).

=== Season 2–present ===
After spending millions on the series, CBS announced a second season with major format changes, shifting the focus to competition and strategy, similar to Survivor.

The key change was that HouseGuests, not the public, decide who to remove (evict) from the game. In the new format, HouseGuests also compete for safety and power. The game continues in this format until its final day, in which a panel of evicted HouseGuests vote for the winner among two finalists. The winner receives $750,000 ($500,000 prior to season 23) while the runner-up receives $75,000 ($50,000 prior to season 23).

==== Head of Household ====
Head of Household logo

The Head of Household (HOH) competition, introduced in season 2, is held at the beginning of each week. The winner of the competition receives immunity from eviction and has the power to nominate two (or three) HouseGuests for eviction. They also receive other special privileges, including their own bedroom. The incumbent HOH is not allowed to compete in the following week's competition. Most competitions are either quiz-based, endurance-based, or skill-based. Some competitions are finished during the live eviction broadcast.

==== Power of Veto ====
Power of Veto symbol, used since the show's third season

The Power of Veto (POV) competition, introduced in season 3, takes place after the HOH competition. Six HouseGuests compete in the POV competition: the HOH, the nominees, and other selected HouseGuests. (Note: Prior to season 5, all HouseGuests were allowed to compete.) Since season 7, before the start of each POV competition, the HOH and the nominees randomly draw additional HouseGuests for the competition.

The winner of the POV competition has the power to either save one nominee from risk of eviction, or leave the HOH's original nominations intact. The veto meeting is the formal setting in which the winning POV holder announces their decision.

During season 3, the power was known as the Silver Power of Veto and did not allow a nominated HouseGuest to use the veto on themselves. The final Power of Veto that season was the Golden Power of Veto, allowing a nominated HouseGuest to remove themselves from the nomination block. Beginning in season 4, the Golden Power of Veto was made a permanent component of the game.

==== BB Block Buster ====
The BB Block Buster Competition, introduced in season 26, takes place on eviction night. The three nominated HouseGuests compete in a challenge where the winner is saved from eviction, leaving the remaining two facing the vote as normal. During season 26, the addition was known as the "A.I. Arena". Beginning in season 27, the challenge was renamed the "BB Block Buster" and made a permanent component of the series.

==== Eviction ====
At the end of the week, all HouseGuests (except the HOH and the nominees) cast a vote for eviction. Broadcast live, HouseGuests enter the diary room one-by-one and privately cast their votes. Prior to season 10, HouseGuests' eviction votes were prerecorded, with the voting switching to a live phase about halfway through the game. The HouseGuest receiving a majority of the votes is evicted from the house. In the event of a tie, the HOH casts the deciding vote.

A notable variant, called "double eviction", has been done in two forms. The first, dubbed Fast Forward Week, had week-long events occur in an accelerated format, with two HouseGuests evicted over the course of a week. The second, "Double Eviction Night", introduced in season 7, had the events of a traditional week occur over the course of a single live eviction episode. This event became a staple of the show. Season 22 introduced the Triple Eviction Night, with three HouseGuests being evicted in a similar manner. (Note: The Triple Eviction Night was previously used on Big Brother Canada with a different format – where a single live round was played, with three nominees and two HouseGuests being evicted within a single round.) Season 27 revealed once an eviction vote is cast, it is official and cannot be rescinded.

Another variant is Hit the Road, as seen in seasons 14, 18, and 27 in which HouseGuests compete in the competition(s) for survival in the house, and the HouseGuest(s) who finished last may face automatic nomination, or outright eviction.

==== Final three ====
The standard nomination process continues until there are three HouseGuests left. At this point, HouseGuests participate in the season's final HOH competition, which is divided into three rounds: the first is endurance-based, the second is skill-based, and the final is quiz-based. The winner of the first round automatically qualifies for final round, while the remaining HouseGuests compete in round two where the winner advances to round three and the loser becomes a nominee. The winner of round three casts the final eviction vote, choosing who to stand against for the jury's vote.

==== Other competitions ====
The food and luxury competitions, which have been a staple of the show since the beginning, have also been adjusted to reflect the current game's format. HouseGuests may compete in luxury competitions, with prizes including the opportunity to watch a film or a small cash prize.

==== Have-nots ====
In the early seasons, the losers of a "have-not competition" would not be permitted to eat any food except peanut butter and jelly sandwiches. Beginning in season 7, the losers were instead required to eat "slop", sleep in an uncomfortable have-not room, and take cold showers. (Note: Slop has proven to be an issue for some HouseGuests. In both cases on Season 9, hypoglycemic HouseGuest Amanda Hansen fainted and had a seizure after only a few days of being on the slop diet, while HouseGuest Allison Nichols had an allergic reaction to the slop; both women were medically evacuated from the house, though they returned the following morning.) Since season 22, later weeks forego have-not competitions. Instead, either the current HOH or the previous have-not recipients decide the week's have-nots. HouseGuests may be penalized for not following have-not rules, usually with a penalty vote for eviction, or in some cases, an additional day of have-not status. (Note: A controversy occurred during season 21 in which Jackson Michie, the season's eventual winner, broke the Have-Not rule, but was not issued a penalty due to the obstruction of the camera view behind the shower walls while eating non-slop, resulting in the Have-Not being unseen for the remainder of that season.)

==== Jury ====
===== Seasons 2 and 3 =====
In seasons 2 and 3, all evicted HouseGuests were part of the jury. Before the final vote, each evicted HouseGuest asked one question to the final two contestants, who could hear but not see the jury. The finalists then had the opportunity to make a final statement before the vote. Each evicted HouseGuest voted for the winner by choosing a gold key labeled with the chosen finalist's name. They placed their key into one of twelve slots on the voting box. After reuniting with the final two contestants in the house, the evictees revealed their choices, one by one. The HouseGuest with the most votes was declared the winner of Big Brother.

===== Season 4–present =====
Beginning in season 4, evicted HouseGuests were known as jurors. Jurors live in the sequestered "jury house", and are shown group events and competitions. Jurors are not shown contestant interviews or any other footage that may include strategy or details regarding nominations.

Prior to the finale, the jury is asked to agree on three questions for each of the final two HouseGuests. At the studio on finale night, the jurors question the finalists. After the questioning is complete, each of the two finalists make a final speech. Then, in order of eviction, each of the jurors secretly selects the key of the HouseGuest that they want to win. The host then pulls out the keys from the box, revealing whom each juror chose. The HouseGuest receiving the majority of votes is then declared the winner of Big Brother.

==== America's Favorite HouseGuest ====
Beginning in season 7, viewers have voted to determine the recipient of the "America's Favorite HouseGuest". (Note: America's Favorite HouseGuest was not included in season 8 or the Over the Top spin-off.) The winner receives a cash prize of $50,000 ($25,000 prior to season 23); the results are announced during the season finale.

== History ==
Logos

Season 1

Seasons 2–15

Seasons 16–21

Seasons 22–25

The series was bought by CBS in early 2000 for an estimated $20 million. It officially premiered on July 5, 2000, with ten HouseGuests entering the house. The series takes its name from the character in George Orwell's 1949 novel Nineteen Eighty-Four. Since 2001, as a result of a lawsuit settlement, Big Brother displays the following disclaimer in the end credits: "This program is not associated or affiliated with the Estate of George Orwell and is not based on the novel '1984'."

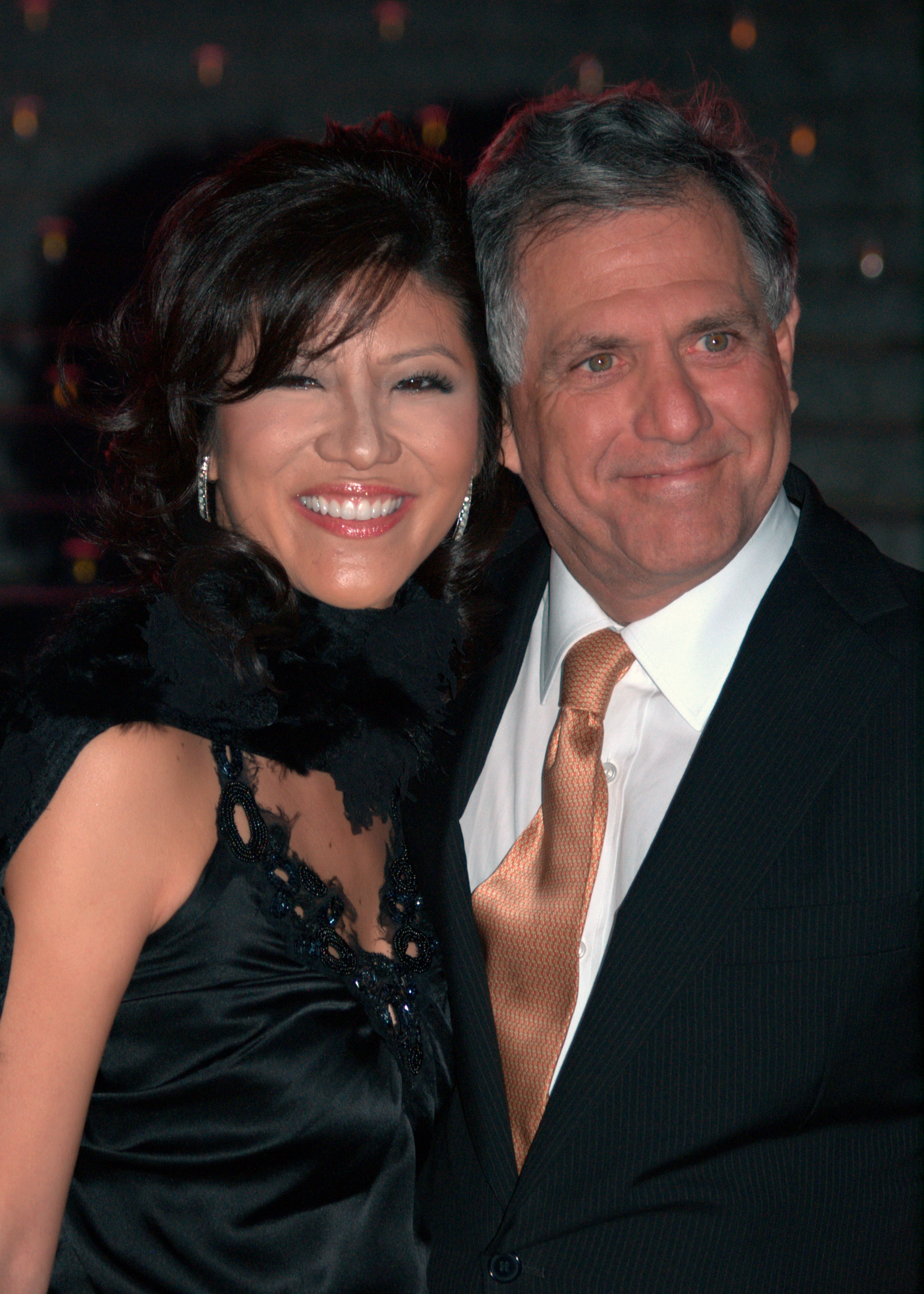
Julie Chen Moonves, seen here with Les Moonves, has hosted the series since its premiere.

Since its inception, the show has been hosted by Julie Chen. It is produced by Allison Grodner and Rich Meehan for Fly on the Wall Entertainment and Banijay Americas (formerly Endemol USA and Endemol Shine North America). The series airs once a year, during the summer, except for the ninth season, which aired in the spring of 2008.

Throughout its run, Big Brother has been criticized following reports of "HIB" (Harassment, Intimidation and Bullying), violence in the house, obscene language, breach of integrity, and the physical and mental strain of appearing on the series. Several seasons have also been criticized for racism and discrimination, most notably season 15 and season 21.

On September 9, 2018, Chen's husband, Les Moonves, resigned as President of CBS after a second wave of reports of sexual misconduct allegations against him. On September 13, Chen closed out that evening's episode by saying, "From outside the Big Brother house with Brent, I'm Julie Chen Moonves. Good night." As Chen had previously never used Moonves professionally, many saw the move as Chen standing in solidarity with her husband. Following her resignation from The Talk on September 18 after eight years as co-host, there was speculation on whether Chen would continue as host of Big Brother. Chen did return to host the following year, and has become increasingly spiritual and religious on and off the program in the wake of such revelations.

Beginning with the 2021–2022 broadcast season, CBS mandated that its reality shows' casts were at least 50% BIPOC (Black, Indigenous, and people of color).

Big Brother was nominated for Best Competition Show at the 2023 MTV Movie & TV Awards.

== Series overview ==
Season	Episodes	Originally released			Days	HouseGuests	Winner	Runner–up	America's Favorite	Final vote	Average viewers (millions)
Season	Episodes	First released	Last released	Network	Days	HouseGuests	Winner	Runner–up	America's Favorite	Final vote	Average viewers (millions)
1	70	July 5, 2000	September 29, 2000	CBS	88	10	Eddie McGee	Josh Souza	—N/a	59–27–14% (Note: For the first season and Over the Top, the public voted to determine the winner between the three finalists. The voting percentages were not revealed for Over the Top; however, it was revealed that the margin of victory was within 20,000 votes between the winner and the first runner–up.)	9.01
2	30	July 5, 2001	September 20, 2001	CBS	82	12	Will Kirby	Nicole Schaffrich	—N/a	5–2	7.90
3	33	July 10, 2002	September 25, 2002	CBS	82	12	Lisa Donahue	Danielle Reyes	—N/a	9–1	8.70
4	33	July 8, 2003	September 24, 2003	CBS	82	13	Jun Song	Alison Irwin	—N/a	6–1	8.80
5	31	July 6, 2004	September 21, 2004	CBS	82	14	Drew Daniel	Michael Ellis	—N/a	4–3	8.30
6	30	July 7, 2005	September 20, 2005	CBS	80	14	Maggie Ausburn	Ivette Corredero	—N/a	4–3	7.24
7 (Note: Also known as Big Brother: All Stars)	28	July 6, 2006	September 12, 2006	CBS	72	14	Mike "Boogie" Malin	Erika Landin	Janelle Pierzina	6–1	7.56
8	33	July 5, 2007	September 18, 2007	CBS	81	14	Dick Donato	Daniele Donato	—N/a	5–2	7.52
9 (Note: Also known as Big Brother: 'Til Death Do You Part)	33	February 12, 2008	April 27, 2008	CBS	81	16	Adam Jasinski	Ryan Quicksall	James Zinkand	6–1	6.56
10	29	July 13, 2008	September 16, 2008	CBS	71	13	Dan Gheesling	Memphis Garrett	Keesha Smith	7–0	6.72
11	30	July 9, 2009	September 15, 2009	CBS	73	13	Jordan Lloyd	Natalie Martinez	Jeff Schroeder	5–2	7.19
12	30	July 8, 2010	September 15, 2010	CBS	75	13	Hayden Moss	Lane Elenburg	Britney Haynes	4–3	7.76
13	29	July 7, 2011	September 14, 2011	CBS	75	14	Rachel Reilly	Porsche Briggs	Jeff Schroeder	4–3	7.95
14	30	July 12, 2012	September 19, 2012	CBS	75	16	Ian Terry	Dan Gheesling	Frank Eudy	6–1	6.79
15	36	June 26, 2013	September 18, 2013	CBS	90	16	Andy Herren	GinaMarie Zimmerman	Elissa Slater	7–2	6.47
16	40	June 25, 2014	September 24, 2014	CBS	97	16	Derrick Levasseur	Cody Calafiore	Donny Thompson	7–2	6.41
17	40	June 24, 2015	September 23, 2015	CBS	98	17	Steve Moses	Liz Nolan	James Huling	6–3	6.18
18	42	June 22, 2016	September 21, 2016	CBS	99	16	Nicole Franzel	Paul Abrahamian	Victor Arroyo	5–4	5.78
OTT	10 (Note: Although technically containing 11 episodes, the two episodes between episode 5 and episode 7 were officially numbered 6.1 and 6.2, leaving the official episode number at 10.)	September 28, 2016	December 1, 2016	CBS All Access	65	13	Morgan Willett	Jason Roy	—N/a	America's Vote	—N/a
19	39	June 28, 2017	September 20, 2017	CBS	92	17	Josh Martinez	Paul Abrahamian	Cody Nickson	5–4	6.06
20	40	June 27, 2018	September 26, 2018	CBS	99	16	Kaycee Clark	Tyler Crispen	Tyler Crispen	5–4	5.41
21	40	June 25, 2019	September 25, 2019	CBS	99	16	Jackson Michie	Holly Allen	Nicole Anthony	6–3	4.38
22	37	August 5, 2020	October 28, 2020	CBS	85	16	Cody Calafiore	Enzo Palumbo	Da'Vonne Rogers	9–0	3.97
23	37	July 7, 2021	September 29, 2021	CBS	85	16	Xavier Prather	Derek Frazier	Tiffany Mitchell	9–0	3.72
24	35	July 6, 2022	September 25, 2022	CBS	82	16	Taylor Hale	Monte Taylor	Taylor Hale	8–1	3.66
25	42	August 2, 2023	November 9, 2023	CBS	100	17	Jagateshwar "Jag" Bains	Matt Klotz	Cameron Hardin	5–2	3.04
RG	6	December 11, 2023	December 21, 2023	CBS	6	9	Nicole Franzel	Taylor Hale	—N/a	—N/a (Note: For the Reindeer Games, the winner was determined by a competition tournament between the four finalists, not a jury vote like in official Big Brother seasons.)	1.88
26	39	July 17, 2024	October 13, 2024	CBS	90	16	Chelsie Baham	Makensy Manbeck	Tucker Des Lauriers	7–0	2.79
27	39	July 10, 2025	September 28, 2025	CBS	83	17	Ashley Hollis	Vince Panaro	Keanu Soto	6–1	3.20
28 (Note: Also known as Big Brother: Time Trip)	41	July 9, 2026	October 1, 2026	CBS	87	17	Rick Devens	Taylor Brown	Rick Devens	6–1	3.35

== Broadcast ==
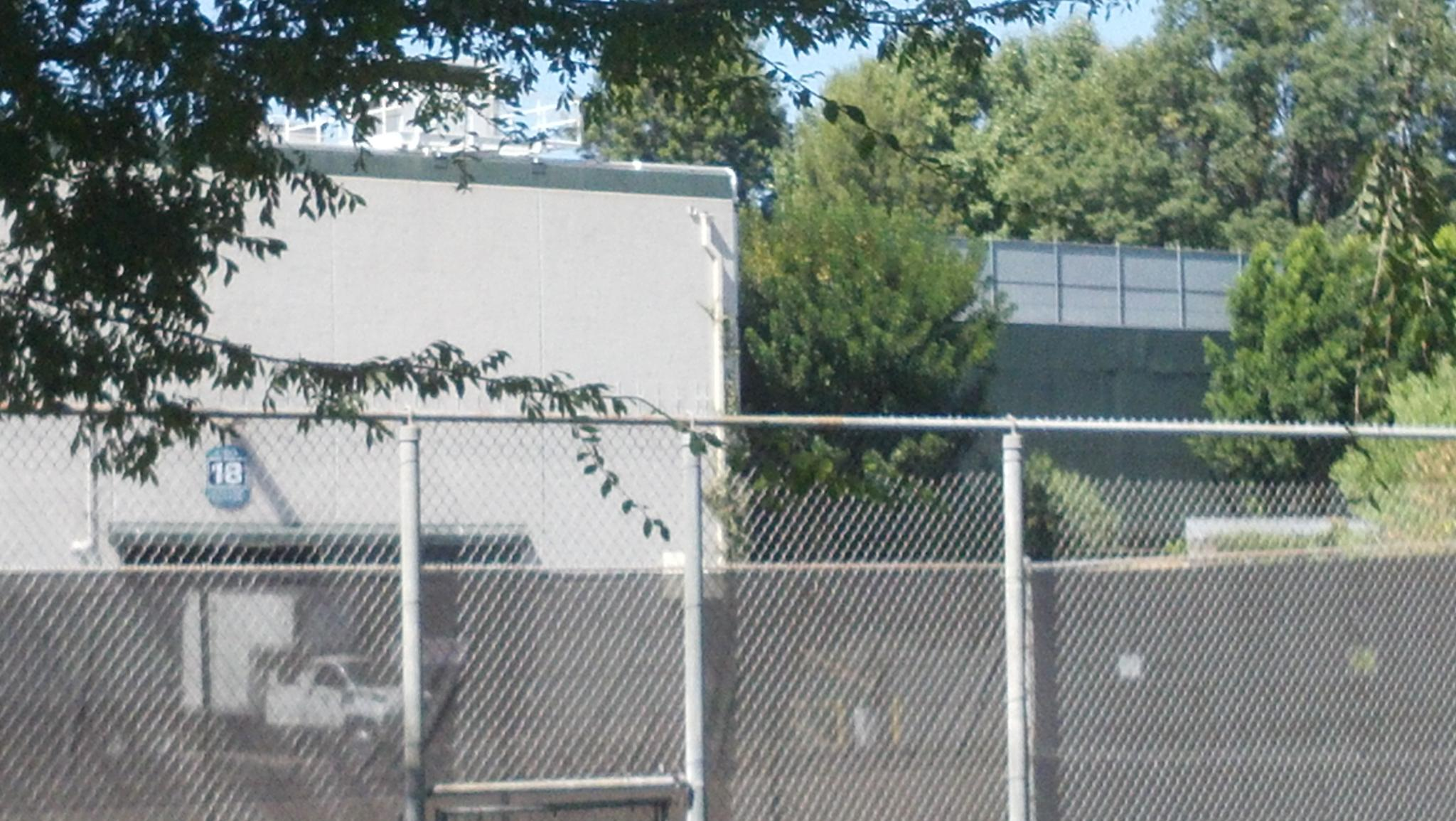
A view of Radford Studio Center sound stage 18, where the house is located

Since its launch in the United States, Big Brother has aired on CBS. The show is simulcast in Canada on Global. Seasons 4 and 9 aired in the United Kingdom.

The first season featured six episodes per week, though all future installments would air three nights per week. Of these three episodes, the weekly eviction episode is the only one that is live, and the only to feature host Julie Chen Moonves. This show generally airs on Thursdays. The series typically airs once per year during the summer; season 9 aired during the spring.

Big Brother was the last prime-time show to transition to high-definition television: the first 15 seasons aired in standard definition, with season 16 being the first to be produced in HDTV. The live feeds were not broadcast in HD until season 17.

Seasons 3 and 4 were released on DVD. Beginning with season 7, seasons are available for purchase on digital retail sites. With season 15, TVGN (now Pop) began airing reruns of the series, making it the first season to be aired following its premiere; this continued with the 16th season. All seasons of Big Brother are available on Paramount+ (formerly CBS All Access).

=== Live feeds ===
A major aspect of Big Brother is the live feeds, in which viewers can view the contestants inside the house. Feeds are shut off during the weekly nomination ceremony, Power of Veto ceremony, competitions, and evictions for that week; this is to provide suspense for the series. Slanderous statements and singing of copyrighted music may be blocked for legal reasons.

During the first season, access to live feeds was free, hosted by AOL on the show's official site. Beginning with the second season, a paid subscription has been required to access the live feeds. From season 2–14, live feeds were available through RealNetworks either as a subscription or as a free addition for Gold members. Since 2016, the live feeds have aired on CBS All Access (known as Paramount+ since March 2021). In 2023, the live feeds launched on Pluto TV with commercials, marking the first time they have been offered for free since the first season.

== HouseGuests ==
As of season 28, a total of 380 participants have competed on Big Brother, Big Brother: Over the Top, and Big Brother: Reindeer Games and 46 of them have competed in multiple seasons.

== Companion shows ==
=== House Calls: The Big Brother Talk Show ===
From 2004 to 2008, Big Brother aired the companion web series House Calls: The Big Brother Talk Show. The series, which lasted for thirty minutes and aired on weeknights, allowed fans to call in and discuss the events of the game. House Calls was the first live internet talk show produced exclusively for a television network. During its first two seasons, House Calls was hosted by Gretchen Massey and season 3 HouseGuest Marcellas Reynolds. Beginning with the show's third season, different co-hosts were featured on the series each day. During the fifth and sixth seasons, each co-host was given a designated day of the week to host alongside Gretchen. Following sixth season of House Calls, it was confirmed that the show would not be renewed.

=== Big Brother: After Dark ===
Big Brother: After Dark debuted in 2007, airing nightly on Showtime 2 from 12:00 a.m.–3:00 a.m. ET. In 2013, it was moved to TVGN (now Pop), where it remained until 2019.

=== Big Brother: Live Chat ===
Former HouseGuest Jeff Schroeder began hosting the Big Brother: Live Chat online discussion show in 2012, where he interviewed HouseGuests both before they entered the house and following their evictions. He also performed post-finale backyard interviews with the cast. On August 10, 2017, Schroeder announced that he was moving to Colorado and would no longer be able to do the interviews.

=== Off the Block with Ross and Marissa ===
For season 20, the Live Chat was replaced by Off the Block with Ross and Marissa. Hosted by former Celebrity Big Brother HouseGuests Marissa Jaret Winokur and Ross Mathews, the show aired on Fridays on Facebook following the live eviction.

=== Big Brother: Unlocked ===
For season 27, CBS announced Big Brother: Unlocked. Airing bi-weekly on CBS, Unlocked is hosted by former Big Brother winners Taylor Hale and Derrick Levasseur along with a rotating guest. The show features gameplay analysis by the hosts as well as additional footage not included on the regular Big Brother broadcast. Unlocked returned for season 28 with Jerry O'Connell joining previous hosts Hale and Levasseur. Additionally, CBS launched a new interactive fan vote during these episodes and a live studio audience.

== Spin-offs ==
=== Big Brother: Over the Top ===
In October 2016, CBS premiered Big Brother: Over the Top, as an original series for CBS All Access. Unlike the flagship television version, it was broadcast exclusively online (over-the-top) with a shorter, ten-week season.

=== Celebrity Big Brother ===
The second spin-off, Celebrity Big Brother, aired its first season on CBS on February 7, 2018. Its second season aired in 2019, and its third season aired in 2022.

=== Big Brother: Reindeer Games ===
Big Brother: Reindeer Games, a holiday-themed spin-off, aired in December 2023. It had six episodes, broadcast over two weeks. The season, featuring nine returning players, was entirely pre-taped and did not have live feeds. Julie Chen Moonves did not host Reindeer Games.

== See also ==
- Big Brother Canada
- The Glass House
- Opposite Worlds
- House of Villains
- The Truman Show
- Love Island USA
