= Gretchen Massey =

Gretchen Wynnifer Massey Lukas (born 1969 in Newport News, Virginia) is a Los Angeles-based radio host and performer. Her CBS Radio talk show 'CrackinUp w/ Gretchen & the Lukes' aired weekly on the Los Angeles station KLSX 97.1 Free FM every 'Fraturday' (their word for Fridays, 11pm-1am pacific). Gretchen had a long run at KLSX as a talk radio host of several different programs over many years up until the station changed to all music format on February 20, 2009.

Massey has a history in entertainment of being an actor, comedian and also as a talk show host. In the past, she was lead host of the nationally syndicated radio talk show "Radio Girls" and was on 97.1 KLSK FM talk radio station in Los Angeles, as co-host of "Lauren & Gretchen Uncut." Massey had a love of the theatre and performing from an early age and attended Dallas's Booker T. Washington High School for the Performing and Visual Arts. This love evolved into a long journey of writing and performing through many cities with various theater companies, improvisational theatre groups and then as a stand-up comedian later in her life. She is well known for being one of the various presenters on the Playboy TV television show, Sexcetera.

== Big Brother ==
She was the host of the CBS Big Brother show House Calls: The Big Brother Talk Show that was broadcast weekdays on cbs.com, when Big Brother USA is in season. House Calls analyzed the goings-on taking place in the Big Brother USA house and game. Gretchen hosted House Calls with Marcellas Reynolds for its first two years. Due to Marcellas being part of season 7's All-Stars, Gretchen was the sole host. Many assumed Marcellas would return to his co-hosting duties, but due to budget cuts he did not return to House Calls for its fourth season (aired during Big Brother 8). House Calls was canceled after season 10.
