= List of Big Brother (American TV series) episodes =

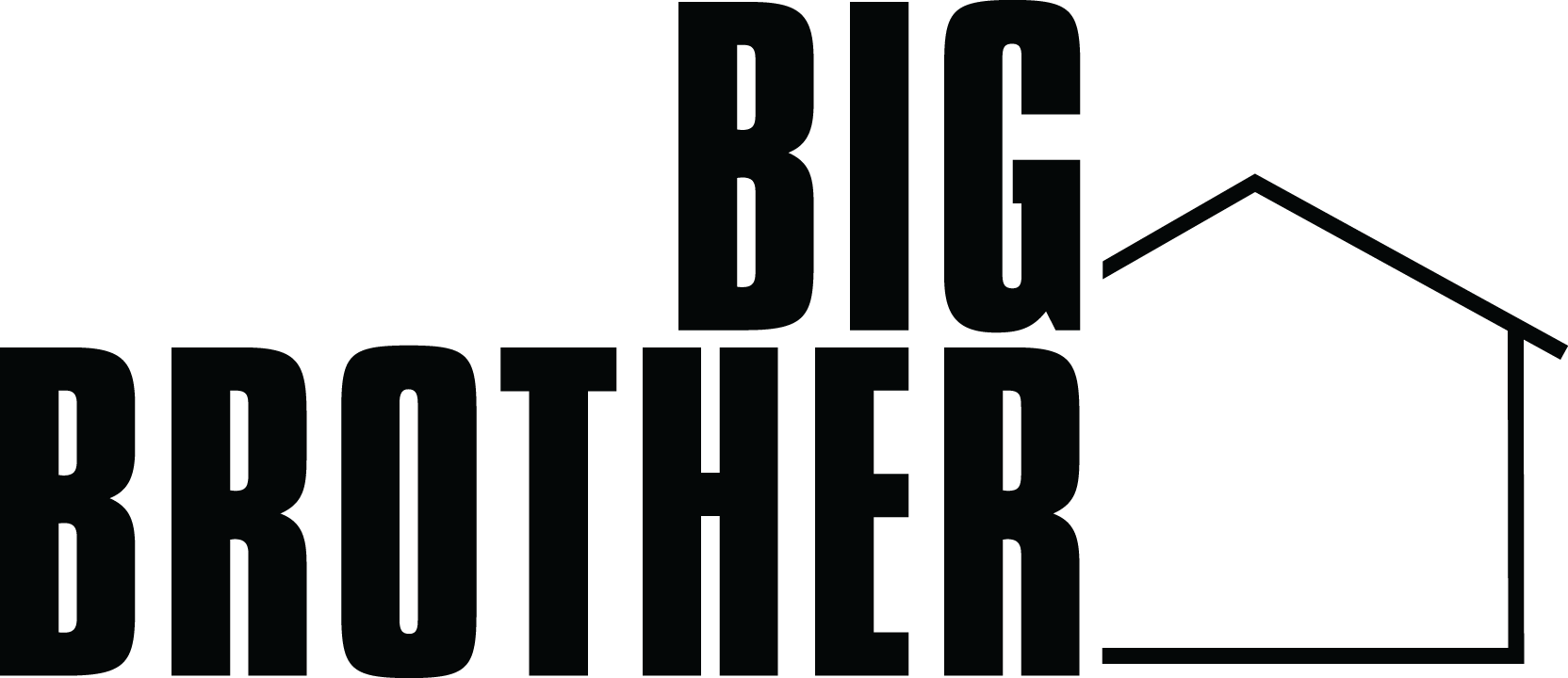

Big Brother is an American reality television series based on the Dutch television series of the same name created by John de Mol Jr. in 1997. The series premiered on July 5, 2000. The series follows a group of contestants, known as HouseGuests, who live together in a custom–built home under constant surveillance. The HouseGuests are completely isolated from the outside world and generally have no communication from the outside world. In the first season, HouseGuests would nominate two of their fellow HouseGuests. The two HouseGuests with the most votes would be "marked for banishment" and the public then voted on whom to "banish" from the house. When three HouseGuests remained, the public voted on the winner. Despite an initial successful start, ratings and critical reaction continued to grow increasingly negative. This led to the second season being a revamp of the show featuring a more competition–based challenge. Starting with the second season, HouseGuests compete in a series of competitions to win power and safety, they then vote to "evict" one of their own until there are only two HouseGuests remaining. In finale episodes, previous HouseGuests vote on who they think they should win the game, with the HouseGuest who receives the most votes being declared the winner and receiving the grand prize.

As of October 1, 2026, 1,016 episodes of Big Brother have aired, concluding the twenty-eighth season.

- Seasons: 1
- 2
- 3
- 4
- 5
- 6
- 7
- 8
- 9
- 10
- 11
- 12
- 13
- 14
- 15
- 16
- 17
- 18
- 19
- 20
- 21
- 22
- 23
- 24
- 25
- 26
- 27
- 28
- Specials
- References
- External links

== Series overview ==
Season	Episodes	Originally released			Days	HouseGuests	Winner	Runner–up	America's Favorite	Final vote	Average viewers (millions)
Season	Episodes	First released	Last released	Network	Days	HouseGuests	Winner	Runner–up	America's Favorite	Final vote	Average viewers (millions)
1	70	July 5, 2000	September 29, 2000	CBS	88	10	Eddie McGee	Josh Souza	—N/a	59–27–14% (Note: For the first season and Over the Top, the public voted to determine the winner between the three finalists. The voting percentages were not revealed for Over the Top; however, it was revealed that the margin of victory was within 20,000 votes between the winner and the first runner–up.)	9.01
2	30	July 5, 2001	September 20, 2001	CBS	82	12	Will Kirby	Nicole Schaffrich	—N/a	5–2	7.90
3	33	July 10, 2002	September 25, 2002	CBS	82	12	Lisa Donahue	Danielle Reyes	—N/a	9–1	8.70
4	33	July 8, 2003	September 24, 2003	CBS	82	13	Jun Song	Alison Irwin	—N/a	6–1	8.80
5	31	July 6, 2004	September 21, 2004	CBS	82	14	Drew Daniel	Michael Ellis	—N/a	4–3	8.30
6	30	July 7, 2005	September 20, 2005	CBS	80	14	Maggie Ausburn	Ivette Corredero	—N/a	4–3	7.24
7 (Note: Also known as Big Brother: All Stars)	28	July 6, 2006	September 12, 2006	CBS	72	14	Mike "Boogie" Malin	Erika Landin	Janelle Pierzina	6–1	7.56
8	33	July 5, 2007	September 18, 2007	CBS	81	14	Dick Donato	Daniele Donato	—N/a	5–2	7.52
9 (Note: Also known as Big Brother: 'Til Death Do You Part)	33	February 12, 2008	April 27, 2008	CBS	81	16	Adam Jasinski	Ryan Quicksall	James Zinkand	6–1	6.56
10	29	July 13, 2008	September 16, 2008	CBS	71	13	Dan Gheesling	Memphis Garrett	Keesha Smith	7–0	6.72
11	30	July 9, 2009	September 15, 2009	CBS	73	13	Jordan Lloyd	Natalie Martinez	Jeff Schroeder	5–2	7.19
12	30	July 8, 2010	September 15, 2010	CBS	75	13	Hayden Moss	Lane Elenburg	Britney Haynes	4–3	7.76
13	29	July 7, 2011	September 14, 2011	CBS	75	14	Rachel Reilly	Porsche Briggs	Jeff Schroeder	4–3	7.95
14	30	July 12, 2012	September 19, 2012	CBS	75	16	Ian Terry	Dan Gheesling	Frank Eudy	6–1	6.79
15	36	June 26, 2013	September 18, 2013	CBS	90	16	Andy Herren	GinaMarie Zimmerman	Elissa Slater	7–2	6.47
16	40	June 25, 2014	September 24, 2014	CBS	97	16	Derrick Levasseur	Cody Calafiore	Donny Thompson	7–2	6.41
17	40	June 24, 2015	September 23, 2015	CBS	98	17	Steve Moses	Liz Nolan	James Huling	6–3	6.18
18	42	June 22, 2016	September 21, 2016	CBS	99	16	Nicole Franzel	Paul Abrahamian	Victor Arroyo	5–4	5.78
OTT	10 (Note: Although technically containing 11 episodes, the two episodes between episode 5 and episode 7 were officially numbered 6.1 and 6.2, leaving the official episode number at 10.)	September 28, 2016	December 1, 2016	CBS All Access	65	13	Morgan Willett	Jason Roy	—N/a	America's Vote	—N/a
19	39	June 28, 2017	September 20, 2017	CBS	92	17	Josh Martinez	Paul Abrahamian	Cody Nickson	5–4	6.06
20	40	June 27, 2018	September 26, 2018	CBS	99	16	Kaycee Clark	Tyler Crispen	Tyler Crispen	5–4	5.41
21	40	June 25, 2019	September 25, 2019	CBS	99	16	Jackson Michie	Holly Allen	Nicole Anthony	6–3	4.38
22	37	August 5, 2020	October 28, 2020	CBS	85	16	Cody Calafiore	Enzo Palumbo	Da'Vonne Rogers	9–0	3.97
23	37	July 7, 2021	September 29, 2021	CBS	85	16	Xavier Prather	Derek Frazier	Tiffany Mitchell	9–0	3.72
24	35	July 6, 2022	September 25, 2022	CBS	82	16	Taylor Hale	Monte Taylor	Taylor Hale	8–1	3.66
25	42	August 2, 2023	November 9, 2023	CBS	100	17	Jagateshwar "Jag" Bains	Matt Klotz	Cameron Hardin	5–2	3.04
RG	6	December 11, 2023	December 21, 2023	CBS	6	9	Nicole Franzel	Taylor Hale	—N/a	—N/a (Note: For the Reindeer Games, the winner was determined by a competition tournament between the four finalists, not a jury vote like in official Big Brother seasons.)	1.88
26	39	July 17, 2024	October 13, 2024	CBS	90	16	Chelsie Baham	Makensy Manbeck	Tucker Des Lauriers	7–0	2.79
27	39	July 10, 2025	September 28, 2025	CBS	83	17	Ashley Hollis	Vince Panaro	Keanu Soto	6–1	3.20
28 (Note: Also known as Big Brother: Time Trip)	41	July 9, 2026	October 1, 2026	CBS	87	17	Rick Devens	Taylor Brown	Rick Devens	6–1	3.35

== Specials (2006, 2023) ==
No.	Title	Original release date	U.S. viewers (millions)	Rating (18–49)
1	"Big Brother All-Stars: America's Choice"	June 21, 2006	5.8	2.2
This special preceded Big Brother 7 and revealed the "All–Star" cast that was voted into the house by viewers of the series and production staff.
2	"25th Anniversary Celebration: An Entertainment Tonight Special"	July 26, 2023	1.52	0.2
Julie Chen Moonves and Nischelle Turner look back on the previous twenty-four seasons of Big Brother. The two provided an analysis into contestants, competitions, production designs, showmances, and gameplay. Notable former HouseGuests were interviewed about their favorite moments from the series. A sneak peek was shown into the house design for the twenty-fifth season.

== See also ==
- List of Celebrity Big Brother (American TV series) episodes, a list of the American version of Celebrity Big Brother episodes
