= List of Big Brother (American TV series) episodes (2000–2009) =

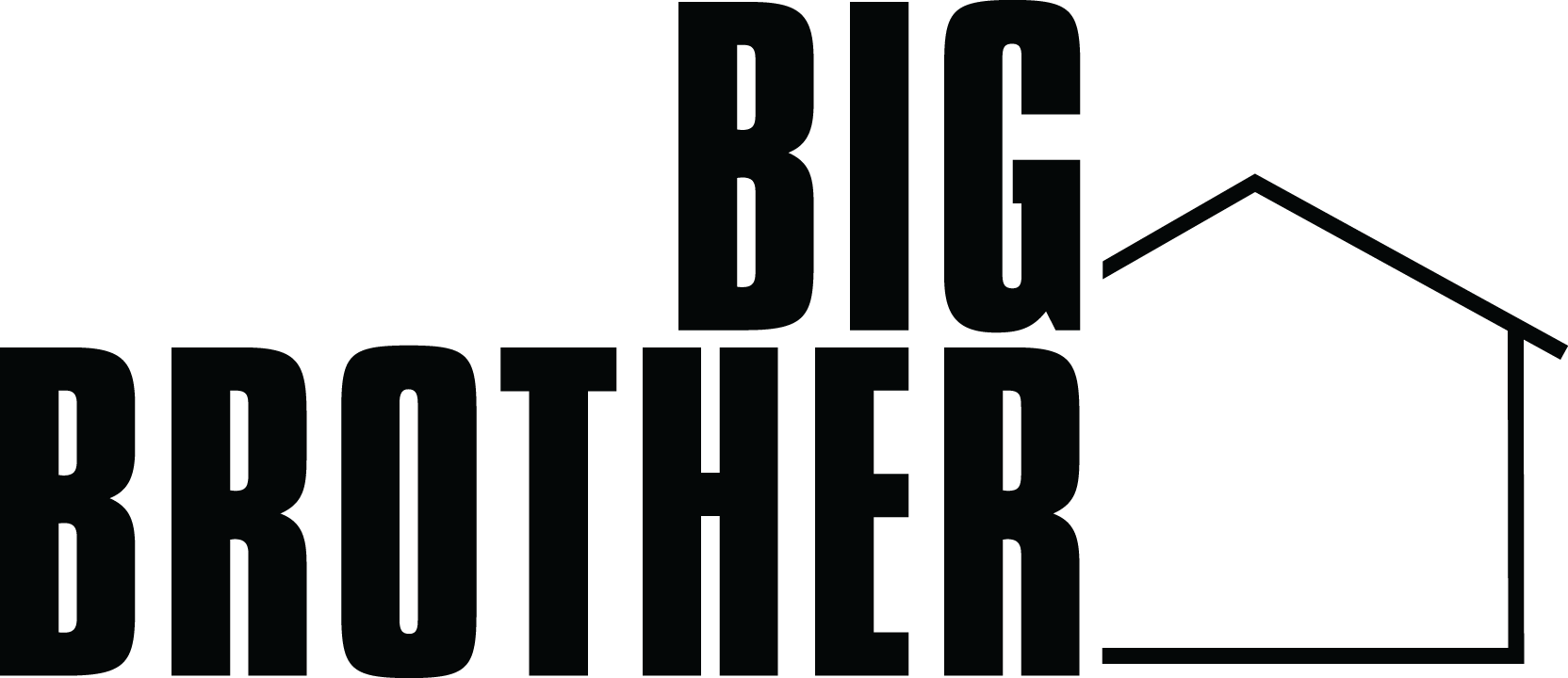

Big Brother is an American reality television series based on the Dutch television series of the same name created by John de Mol Jr. in 1997. The series premiered on July 5, 2000. The series follows a group of contestants, known as HouseGuests, who live together in a custom–built home under constant surveillance. The HouseGuests are completely isolated from the outside world and generally have no communication from the outside world. In the first season, HouseGuests would nominate two of their fellow HouseGuests. The two HouseGuests with the most votes would be "marked for banishment" and the public then voted on whom to "banish" from the house. When three HouseGuests remained, the public voted on the winner. Despite an initial successful start, ratings and critical reaction continued to grow increasingly negative. This led to the second season being a revamp of the show featuring a more competition–based challenge. Starting with the second season, HouseGuests compete in a series of competitions to win power and safety, they then vote to "evict" one of their own until there are only two HouseGuests remaining. In finale episodes, previous HouseGuests vote on who they think they should win the game, with the HouseGuest who receives the most votes being declared the winner and receiving the grand prize.

As of August 27, 2026, 1,016 episodes of Big Brother have aired, currently in its twenty-eighth season.

== Series overview ==
Season	Episodes	Originally released			Days	HouseGuests	Winner	Runner–up	America's Favorite	Final vote	Average viewers (millions)
Season	Episodes	First released	Last released	Network	Days	HouseGuests	Winner	Runner–up	America's Favorite	Final vote	Average viewers (millions)
1	70	July 5, 2000	September 29, 2000	CBS	88	10	Eddie McGee	Josh Souza	—N/a	59–27–14% (Note: For the first season and Over the Top, the public voted to determine the winner between the three finalists. The voting percentages were not revealed for Over the Top; however, it was revealed that the margin of victory was within 20,000 votes between the winner and the first runner–up.)	9.01
2	30	July 5, 2001	September 20, 2001	CBS	82	12	Will Kirby	Nicole Schaffrich	—N/a	5–2	7.90
3	33	July 10, 2002	September 25, 2002	CBS	82	12	Lisa Donahue	Danielle Reyes	—N/a	9–1	8.70
4	33	July 8, 2003	September 24, 2003	CBS	82	13	Jun Song	Alison Irwin	—N/a	6–1	8.80
5	31	July 6, 2004	September 21, 2004	CBS	82	14	Drew Daniel	Michael Ellis	—N/a	4–3	8.30
6	30	July 7, 2005	September 20, 2005	CBS	80	14	Maggie Ausburn	Ivette Corredero	—N/a	4–3	7.24
7 (Note: Also known as Big Brother: All Stars)	28	July 6, 2006	September 12, 2006	CBS	72	14	Mike "Boogie" Malin	Erika Landin	Janelle Pierzina	6–1	7.56
8	33	July 5, 2007	September 18, 2007	CBS	81	14	Dick Donato	Daniele Donato	—N/a	5–2	7.52
9 (Note: Also known as Big Brother: 'Til Death Do You Part)	33	February 12, 2008	April 27, 2008	CBS	81	16	Adam Jasinski	Ryan Quicksall	James Zinkand	6–1	6.56
10	29	July 13, 2008	September 16, 2008	CBS	71	13	Dan Gheesling	Memphis Garrett	Keesha Smith	7–0	6.72
11	30	July 9, 2009	September 15, 2009	CBS	73	13	Jordan Lloyd	Natalie Martinez	Jeff Schroeder	5–2	7.19
12	30	July 8, 2010	September 15, 2010	CBS	75	13	Hayden Moss	Lane Elenburg	Britney Haynes	4–3	7.76
13	29	July 7, 2011	September 14, 2011	CBS	75	14	Rachel Reilly	Porsche Briggs	Jeff Schroeder	4–3	7.95
14	30	July 12, 2012	September 19, 2012	CBS	75	16	Ian Terry	Dan Gheesling	Frank Eudy	6–1	6.79
15	36	June 26, 2013	September 18, 2013	CBS	90	16	Andy Herren	GinaMarie Zimmerman	Elissa Slater	7–2	6.47
16	40	June 25, 2014	September 24, 2014	CBS	97	16	Derrick Levasseur	Cody Calafiore	Donny Thompson	7–2	6.41
17	40	June 24, 2015	September 23, 2015	CBS	98	17	Steve Moses	Liz Nolan	James Huling	6–3	6.18
18	42	June 22, 2016	September 21, 2016	CBS	99	16	Nicole Franzel	Paul Abrahamian	Victor Arroyo	5–4	5.78
OTT	10 (Note: Although technically containing 11 episodes, the two episodes between episode 5 and episode 7 were officially numbered 6.1 and 6.2, leaving the official episode number at 10.)	September 28, 2016	December 1, 2016	CBS All Access	65	13	Morgan Willett	Jason Roy	—N/a	America's Vote	—N/a
19	39	June 28, 2017	September 20, 2017	CBS	92	17	Josh Martinez	Paul Abrahamian	Cody Nickson	5–4	6.06
20	40	June 27, 2018	September 26, 2018	CBS	99	16	Kaycee Clark	Tyler Crispen	Tyler Crispen	5–4	5.41
21	40	June 25, 2019	September 25, 2019	CBS	99	16	Jackson Michie	Holly Allen	Nicole Anthony	6–3	4.38
22	37	August 5, 2020	October 28, 2020	CBS	85	16	Cody Calafiore	Enzo Palumbo	Da'Vonne Rogers	9–0	3.97
23	37	July 7, 2021	September 29, 2021	CBS	85	16	Xavier Prather	Derek Frazier	Tiffany Mitchell	9–0	3.72
24	35	July 6, 2022	September 25, 2022	CBS	82	16	Taylor Hale	Monte Taylor	Taylor Hale	8–1	3.66
25	42	August 2, 2023	November 9, 2023	CBS	100	17	Jagateshwar "Jag" Bains	Matt Klotz	Cameron Hardin	5–2	3.04
RG	6	December 11, 2023	December 21, 2023	CBS	6	9	Nicole Franzel	Taylor Hale	—N/a	—N/a (Note: For the Reindeer Games, the winner was determined by a competition tournament between the four finalists, not a jury vote like in official Big Brother seasons.)	1.88
26	39	July 17, 2024	October 13, 2024	CBS	90	16	Chelsie Baham	Makensy Manbeck	Tucker Des Lauriers	7–0	2.79
27	39	July 10, 2025	September 28, 2025	CBS	83	17	Ashley Hollis	Vince Panaro	Keanu Soto	6–1	3.20
28 (Note: Also known as Big Brother: Time Trip)	41	July 9, 2026	October 1, 2026	CBS	87	17	TBA	TBA	TBA	TBA	TBA

== Episodes ==
=== Season 1 (2000) ===
No. overall	No. in season	Title	Original release date	U.S. viewers (millions)
1	1	"Episode 1"	July 5, 2000	22.45
2	2	"Episode 2"	July 6, 2000	11.58
3	3	"Episode 3"	July 7, 2000	9.12
4	4	"Episode 4"	July 8, 2000	6.40
5	5	"Episode 5"	July 10, 2000	10.53
6	6	"Episode 6"	July 11, 2000	8.56
7	7	"Episode 7"	July 13, 2000	10.97
8	8	"Episode 8"	July 14, 2000	8.10
9	9	"Episode 9"	July 15, 2000	6.44
10	10	"Episode 10"	July 17, 2000	9.54
11	11	"Episode 11"	July 18, 2000	8.39
12	12	"Episode 12"	July 20, 2000	11.32
13	13	"Episode 13"	July 21, 2000	7.68
14	14	"Episode 14"	July 22, 2000	5.34
15	15	"Episode 15"	July 24, 2000	10.59
16	16	"Episode 16"	July 25, 2000	7.96
17	17	"Episode 17"	July 26, 2000	16.92
18	18	"Episode 18"	July 27, 2000	8.95
19	19	"Episode 19"	July 28, 2000	7.47
20	20	"Episode 20"	July 29, 2000	5.75
21	21	"Episode 21"	July 31, 2000	9.00
22	22	"Episode 22"	August 1, 2000	8.48
23	23	"Episode 23"	August 2, 2000	17.44
24	24	"Episode 24"	August 3, 2000	7.64
25	25	"Episode 25"	August 4, 2000	6.34
26	26	"Episode 26"	August 5, 2000	5.01
27	27	"Episode 27"	August 7, 2000	8.43
28	28	"Episode 28"	August 8, 2000	7.46
29	29	"Episode 29"	August 9, 2000	17.65
30	30	"Episode 30"	August 10, 2000	7.18
31	31	"Episode 31"	August 12, 2000	5.51
32	32	"Episode 32"	August 14, 2000	10.03
33	33	"Episode 33"	August 15, 2000	7.89
34	34	"Episode 34"	August 16, 2000	17.09
35	35	"Episode 35"	August 17, 2000	7.54
36	36	"Episode 36"	August 18, 2000	6.31
37	37	"Episode 37"	August 21, 2000	9.39
38	38	"Episode 38"	August 22, 2000	7.63
39	39	"Episode 39"	August 24, 2000	8.82
40	40	"Episode 40"	August 25, 2000	6.83
41	41	"Episode 41"	August 26, 2000	5.67
42	42	"Episode 42"	August 28, 2000	9.23
43	43	"Episode 43"	August 29, 2000	7.44
44	44	"Episode 44"	August 30, 2000	11.49
45	45	"Episode 45"	August 31, 2000	7.44
46	46	"Episode 46"	September 1, 2000	6.48
47	47	"Episode 47"	September 2, 2000	5.80
48	48	"Episode 48"	September 4, 2000	8.59
49	49	"Episode 49"	September 5, 2000	7.88
50	50	"Episode 50"	September 6, 2000	11.38
51	51	"Episode 51"	September 7, 2000	7.23
52	52	"Episode 52"	September 8, 2000	6.93
53	53	"Episode 53"	September 9, 2000	6.36
54	54	"Episode 54"	September 11, 2000	9.25
55	55	"Episode 55"	September 12, 2000	8.65
56	56	"Episode 56"	September 13, 2000	12.54
57	57	"Episode 57"	September 14, 2000	8.07
58	58	"Episode 58"	September 15, 2000	6.14
59	59	"Episode 59"	September 16, 2000	6.38
60	60	"Episode 60"	September 18, 2000	7.94
61	61	"Episode 61"	September 19, 2000	8.04
62	62	"Episode 62"	September 20, 2000	9.66
63	63	"Episode 63"	September 21, 2000	7.57
64	64	"Episode 64"	September 22, 2000	6.17
65	65	"Episode 65"	September 23, 2000	6.78
66	66	"Episode 66"	September 25, 2000	8.09
67	67	"Episode 67"	September 26, 2000	7.92
68	68	"Episode 68"	September 27, 2000	9.56
69	69	"Episode 69"	September 28, 2000	8.36
70	70	"Episode 70"	September 29, 2000	11.13

=== Season 2 (2001) ===
No. overall	No. in season	Title	Original release date	U.S. viewers (millions)
Week 1
71	1	"Episode 1"	July 5, 2001	8.18
72	2	"Episode 2"	July 7, 2001	5.03
73	3	"Episode 3"	July 10, 2001	8.27
74	4	"Episode 4"	July 12, 2001	9.06
Week 2
75	5	"Episode 5"	July 14, 2001	5.16
76	6	"Episode 6"	July 17, 2001	8.31
77	7	"Episode 7"	July 19, 2001	8.80
Week 3
78	8	"Episode 8"	July 21, 2001	5.13
79	9	"Episode 9"	July 24, 2001	7.82
80	10	"Episode 10"	July 26, 2001	8.88
Week 4
81	11	"Episode 11"	July 28, 2001	5.93
82	12	"Episode 12"	July 31, 2001	8.12
83	13	"Episode 13"	August 2, 2001	8.72
Week 5
84	14	"Episode 14"	August 4, 2001	5.73
85	15	"Episode 15"	August 7, 2001	8.90
86	16	"Episode 16"	August 9, 2001	9.66
Week 6
87	17	"Episode 17"	August 11, 2001	5.46
88	18	"Episode 18"	August 14, 2001	8.31
89	19	"Episode 19"	August 16, 2001	9.16
Week 7
90	20	"Episode 20"	August 21, 2001	9.30
91	21	"Episode 21"	August 22, 2001	9.14
Week 8
92	22	"Episode 22"	August 25, 2001	7.12
93	23	"Episode 23"	August 28, 2001	9.75
94	24	"Episode 24"	August 30, 2001	10.26
Week 9
95	25	"Episode 25"	September 4, 2001	11.19
96	26	"Episode 26"	September 5, 2001	11.03
97	27	"Episode 27"	September 6, 2001	10.71
Week 10
98	28	"Episode 28"	September 18, 2001	11.85
99	29	"Episode 29"	September 18, 2001	11.85
100	30	"Episode 30"	September 20, 2001	12.38

=== Season 3 (2002) ===
No. overall	No. in season	Title	Original release date	U.S. viewers (millions)
101	1	"Episode 1"	July 10, 2002	9.19
102	2	"Episode 2"	July 11, 2002	7.59
103	3	"Episode 3"	July 13, 2002	5.32
104	4	"Episode 4"	July 17, 2002	8.93
105	5	"Episode 5"	July 18, 2002	7.85
106	6	"Episode 6"	July 20, 2002	5.66
107	7	"Episode 7"	July 24, 2002	10.21
108	8	"Episode 8"	July 25, 2002	9.04
109	9	"Episode 9"	July 27, 2002	5.98
110	10	"Episode 10"	July 31, 2002	9.99
111	11	"Episode 11"	August 1, 2002	8.62
112	12	"Episode 12"	August 3, 2002	6.34
113	13	"Episode 13"	August 7, 2002	8.68
114	14	"Episode 14"	August 8, 2002	8.64
115	15	"Episode 15"	August 10, 2002	6.44
116	16	"Episode 16"	August 14, 2002	10.58
117	17	"Episode 17"	August 15, 2002	9.69
118	18	"Episode 18"	August 16, 2002	8.49
119	19	"Episode 19"	August 21, 2002	10.24
120	20	"Episode 20"	August 22, 2002	9.64
121	21	"Episode 21"	August 24, 2002	5.69
122	22	"Episode 22"	August 28, 2002	9.23
123	23	"Episode 23"	August 29, 2002	8.44
124	24	"Episode 24"	August 31, 2002	6.32
125	25	"Episode 25"	September 4, 2002	9.20
126	26	"Episode 26"	September 5, 2002	9.79
127	27	"Episode 27"	September 12, 2002	10.62
128	28	"Episode 28"	September 14, 2002	7.34
129	29	"Episode 29"	September 18, 2002	9.40
130	30	"Episode 30"	September 19, 2002	14.57
131	31	"Episode 31"	September 21, 2002	7.93
132	32	"Episode 32"	September 25, 2002	12.94
133	33	"Episode 33"	September 25, 2002	12.94

=== Season 4 (2003) ===
No. overall	No. in season	Title	Original release date	U.S. viewers (millions)
134	1	"Episode 1"	July 8, 2003	9.70
135	2	"Episode 2"	July 9, 2003	9.02
136	3	"Episode 3"	July 11, 2003	7.35
137	4	"Episode 4"	July 15, 2003	7.78
138	5	"Episode 5"	July 16, 2003	8.62
139	6	"Episode 6"	July 18, 2003	6.64
140	7	"Episode 7"	July 22, 2003	7.78
141	8	"Episode 8"	July 23, 2003	8.97
142	9	"Episode 9"	July 25, 2003	6.09
143	10	"Episode 10"	July 29, 2003	8.75
144	11	"Episode 11"	July 30, 2003	9.60
145	12	"Episode 12"	August 1, 2003	7.65
146	13	"Episode 13"	August 5, 2003	8.88
147	14	"Episode 14"	August 6, 2003	10.21
148	15	"Episode 15"	August 8, 2003	7.29
149	16	"Episode 16"	August 12, 2003	9.68
150	17	"Episode 17"	August 13, 2003	9.92
151	18	"Episode 18"	August 16, 2003	6.20
152	19	"Episode 19"	August 19, 2003	8.81
153	20	"Episode 20"	August 20, 2003	9.71
154	21	"Episode 21"	August 23, 2003	7.13
155	22	"Episode 22"	August 25, 2003	8.73
156	23	"Episode 23"	August 27, 2003	10.29
157	24	"Episode 24"	August 29, 2003	7.33
158	25	"Episode 25"	September 2, 2003	9.70
159	26	"Episode 26"	September 3, 2003	9.99
160	27	"Episode 27"	September 5, 2003	7.86
161	28	"Episode 28"	September 9, 2003	8.70
162	29	"Episode 29"	September 10, 2003	10.21
163	30	"Episode 30"	September 16, 2003	9.97
164	31	"Episode 31"	September 17, 2003	10.99
165	32	"Episode 32"	September 19, 2003	7.05
166	33	"Episode 33"	September 24, 2003	10.73

=== Season 5 (2004) ===
No. overall	No. in season	Title	Original release date	U.S. viewers (millions)
167	1	"Episode 1"	July 6, 2004	9.55
168	2	"Episode 2"	July 8, 2004	9.17
169	3	"Episode 3"	July 13, 2004	8.63
170	4	"Episode 4"	July 15, 2004	8.76
171	5	"Episode 5"	July 17, 2004	4.87
172	6	"Episode 6"	July 20, 2004	9.15
173	7	"Episode 7"	July 22, 2004	8.61
174	8	"Episode 8"	July 24, 2004	4.94
175	9	"Episode 9"	July 27, 2004	8.77
176	10	"Episode 10"	July 29, 2004	8.64
177	11	"Episode 11"	July 31, 2004	6.65
178	12	"Episode 12"	August 3, 2004	8.98
179	13	"Episode 13"	August 5, 2004	9.53
180	14	"Episode 14"	August 7, 2004	6.29
181	15	"Episode 15"	August 10, 2004	9.32
182	16	"Episode 16"	August 12, 2004	9.51
183	17	"Episode 17"	August 14, 2004	5.64
184	18	"Episode 18"	August 17, 2004	7.87
185	19	"Episode 19"	August 19, 2004	8.88
186	20	"Episode 20"	August 21, 2004	6.20
187	21	"Episode 21"	August 24, 2004	9.68
188	22	"Episode 22"	August 26, 2004	8.65
189	23	"Episode 23"	August 31, 2004	8.37
190	24	"Episode 24"	September 2, 2004	8.10
191	25	"Episode 25"	September 4, 2004	7.05
192	26	"Episode 26"	September 7, 2004	9.76
193	27	"Episode 27"	September 9, 2004	8.72
194	28	"Episode 28"	September 11, 2004	6.47
195	29	"Episode 29"	September 14, 2004	9.99
196	30	"Episode 30"	September 17, 2004	8.10
197	31	"Episode 31"	September 21, 2004	10.54

=== Season 6 (2005) ===
No. overall	No. in season	Title	Original release date	U.S. viewers (millions)
198	1	"Episode 1"	July 7, 2005	8.47
199	2	"Episode 2"	July 12, 2005	8.34
200	3	"Episode 3"	July 14, 2005	7.72
201	4	"Episode 4"	July 16, 2005	5.03
202	5	"Episode 5"	July 19, 2005	8.12
203	6	"Episode 6"	July 21, 2005	7.85
204	7	"Episode 7"	July 23, 2005	4.93
205	8	"Episode 8"	July 26, 2005	8.16
206	9	"Episode 9"	July 28, 2005	7.39
207	10	"Episode 10"	July 30, 2005	5.13
208	11	"Episode 11"	August 2, 2005	8.56
209	12	"Episode 12"	August 4, 2005	7.70
210	13	"Episode 13"	August 6, 2005	4.94
211	14	"Episode 14"	August 9, 2005	8.11
212	15	"Episode 15"	August 11, 2005	7.17
213	16	"Episode 16"	August 13, 2005	5.46
214	17	"Episode 17"	August 16, 2005	8.70
215	18	"Episode 18"	August 18, 2005	8.24
216	19	"Episode 19"	August 20, 2005	5.85
217	20	"Episode 20"	August 23, 2005	7.95
218	21	"Episode 21"	August 25, 2005	7.76
219	22	"Episode 22"	August 30, 2005	8.25
220	23	"Episode 23"	September 1, 2005	6.33
221	24	"Episode 24"	September 3, 2005	4.94
222	25	"Episode 25"	September 6, 2005	8.08
223	26	"Episode 26"	September 8, 2005	7.48
224	27	"Episode 27"	September 10, 2005	5.83
225	28	"Episode 28"	September 13, 2005	7.85
226	29	"Episode 29"	September 16, 2005	6.94
227	30	"Episode 30"	September 20, 2005	8.15

=== Season 7 (2006) ===
No. overall	No. in season	Title	Original release date	U.S. viewers (millions)
228	1	"Episode 1"	July 6, 2006	7.54
229	2	"Episode 2"	July 11, 2006	7.36
230	3	"Episode 3"	July 13, 2006	7.03
231	4	"Episode 4"	July 16, 2006	5.82
232	5	"Episode 5"	July 18, 2006	6.89
233	6	"Episode 6"	July 20, 2006	6.99
234	7	"Episode 7"	July 23, 2006	6.14
235	8	"Episode 8"	July 25, 2006	7.27
236	9	"Episode 9"	July 27, 2006	7.01
237	10	"Episode 10"	July 30, 2006	6.27
238	11	"Episode 11"	August 1, 2006	7.33
239	12	"Episode 12"	August 3, 2006	6.96
240	13	"Episode 13"	August 6, 2006	6.73
241	14	"Episode 14"	August 8, 2006	7.48
242	15	"Episode 15"	August 10, 2006	7.21
243	16	"Episode 16"	August 13, 2006	7.30
244	17	"Episode 17"	August 15, 2006	7.77
245	18	"Episode 18"	August 17, 2006	7.72
256	19	"Episode 19"	August 20, 2006	8.33
247	20	"Episode 20"	August 22, 2006	8.00
248	21	"Episode 21"	August 24, 2006	8.27
249	22	"Episode 22"	August 27, 2006	8.16
250	23	"Episode 23"	August 29, 2006	8.53
251	24	"Episode 24"	August 31, 2006	7.45
252	25	"Episode 25"	September 3, 2006	7.49
253	26	"Episode 26"	September 5, 2006	8.82
254	27	"Episode 27"	September 7, 2006	8.44
255	28	"Episode 28"	September 12, 2006	8.41

=== Season 8 (2007) ===
No. overall	No. in season	Title	Original release date	U.S. viewers (millions)
256	1	"Episode 1"	July 5, 2007	7.40
257	2	"Episode 2"	July 8, 2007	5.85
258	3	"Episode 3"	July 10, 2007	6.81
259	4	"Episode 4"	July 12, 2007	6.00
260	5	"Episode 5"	July 15, 2007	6.31
261	6	"Episode 6"	July 17, 2007	7.02
262	7	"Episode 7"	July 19, 2007	6.98
263	8	"Episode 8"	July 22, 2007	6.30
264	9	"Episode 9"	July 24, 2007	6.85
265	10	"Episode 10"	July 26, 2007	7.08
266	11	"Episode 11"	July 29, 2007	6.17
267	12	"Episode 12"	July 31, 2007	7.12
268	13	"Episode 13"	August 2, 2007	7.09
269	14	"Episode 14"	August 5, 2007	7.52
270	15	"Episode 15"	August 7, 2007	7.21
271	16	"Episode 16"	August 9, 2007	7.80
272	17	"Episode 17"	August 12, 2007	7.52
273	18	"Episode 18"	August 14, 2007	7.56
274	19	"Episode 19"	August 16, 2007	7.51
275	20	"Episode 20"	August 19, 2007	7.38
276	21	"Episode 21"	August 21, 2007	7.30
277	22	"Episode 22"	August 23, 2007	7.78
278	23	"Episode 23"	August 26, 2007	7.41
279	24	"Episode 24"	August 28, 2007	8.14
280	25	"Episode 25"	August 30, 2007	6.21
281	26	"Episode 26"	September 2, 2007	5.73
282	27	"Episode 27"	September 4, 2007	8.00
283	28	"Episode 28"	September 6, 2007	7.96
284	29	"Episode 29"	September 9, 2007	8.28
285	30	"Episode 30"	September 11, 2007	8.09
286	31	"Episode 31"	September 13, 2007	8.89
287	32	"Episode 32"	September 16, 2007	7.08
288	33	"Episode 33"	September 18, 2007	8.67

=== Season 9 (2008) ===
No. overall	No. in season	Title	Original release date	U.S. viewers (millions)
289	1	"Episode 1"	February 12, 2008	6.88
290	2	"Episode 2"	February 13, 2008	5.65
291	3	"Episode 3"	February 17, 2008	6.58
292	4	"Episode 4"	February 19, 2008	5.22
293	5	"Episode 5"	February 20, 2008	5.76
294	6	"Episode 6"	February 24, 2008	5.39
295	7	"Episode 7"	February 26, 2008	6.72
296	8	"Episode 8"	February 27, 2008	5.38
297	9	"Episode 9"	March 2, 2008	6.23
298	10	"Episode 10"	March 4, 2008	6.18
299	11	"Episode 11"	March 5, 2008	5.58
300	12	"Episode 12"	March 9, 2008	6.37
301	13	"Episode 13"	March 11, 2008	5.87
302	14	"Episode 14"	March 12, 2008	5.31
303	15	"Episode 15"	March 16, 2008	6.28
304	16	"Episode 16"	March 18, 2008	5.38
305	17	"Episode 17"	March 19, 2008	6.60
306	18	"Episode 18"	March 23, 2008	6.46
307	19	"Episode 19"	March 25, 2008	5.96
308	20	"Episode 20"	March 26, 2008	5.87
309	21	"Episode 21"	March 30, 2008	7.46
310	22	"Episode 22"	April 1, 2008	6.12
311	23	"Episode 23"	April 2, 2008	5.94
312	24	"Episode 24"	April 6, 2008	6.32
313	25	"Episode 25"	April 8, 2008	6.18
314	26	"Episode 26"	April 9, 2008	5.84
315	27	"Episode 27"	April 13, 2008	8.25
316	28	"Episode 28"	April 15, 2008	6.20
317	29	"Episode 29"	April 16, 2008	6.09
318	30	"Episode 30"	April 20, 2008	6.35
319	31	"Episode 31"	April 22, 2008	6.50
320	32	"Episode 32"	April 23, 2008	6.60
321	33	"Episode 33"	April 27, 2008	6.39

=== Season 10 (2008) ===
No. overall	No. in season	Title	Original release date	U.S. viewers (millions)
322	1	"Episode 1"	July 13, 2008	6.13
323	2	"Episode 2"	July 15, 2008	6.10
324	3	"Episode 3"	July 16, 2008	5.76
325	4	"Episode 4"	July 20, 2008	5.72
326	5	"Episode 5"	July 22, 2008	6.07
327	6	"Episode 6"	July 23, 2008	6.22
328	7	"Episode 7"	July 27, 2008	5.84
329	8	"Episode 8"	July 29, 2008	6.08
330	9	"Episode 9"	July 31, 2008	6.39
331	10	"Episode 10"	August 3, 2008	6.61
332	11	"Episode 11"	August 5, 2008	6.45
333	12	"Episode 12"	August 7, 2008	5.53
334	13	"Episode 13"	August 10, 2008	5.40
335	14	"Episode 14"	August 12, 2008	6.36
336	15	"Episode 15"	August 14, 2008	5.86
337	16	"Episode 16"	August 17, 2008	5.53
338	17	"Episode 17"	August 19, 2008	6.12
339	18	"Episode 18"	August 21, 2008	6.17
340	19	"Episode 19"	August 24, 2008	6.04
341	20	"Episode 20"	August 26, 2008	6.28
342	21	"Episode 21"	August 28, 2008	5.97
343	22	"Episode 22"	August 31, 2008	5.70
344	23	"Episode 23"	September 2, 2008	6.46
345	24	"Episode 24"	September 4, 2008	6.58
346	25	"Episode 25"	September 7, 2008	7.20
347	26	"Episode 26"	September 9, 2008	6.98
348	27	"Episode 27"	September 11, 2008	7.82
349	28	"Episode 28"	September 14, 2008	6.68
350	29	"Episode 29"	September 16, 2008	7.56

=== Season 11 (2009) ===
No. overall	No. in season	Title	Original release date	U.S. viewers (millions)
351	1	"Episode 1"	July 9, 2009	6.59
352	2	"Episode 2"	July 12, 2009	6.29
353	3	"Episode 3"	July 14, 2009	6.16
354	4	"Episode 4"	July 16, 2009	5.63
355	5	"Episode 5"	July 19, 2009	5.57
356	6	"Episode 6"	July 21, 2009	5.72
357	7	"Episode 7"	July 23, 2009	6.39
358	8	"Episode 8"	July 26, 2009	6.08
359	9	"Episode 9"	July 28, 2009	6.07
360	10	"Episode 10"	July 30, 2009	6.46
361	11	"Episode 11"	August 2, 2009	6.77
362	12	"Episode 12"	August 4, 2009	6.40
363	13	"Episode 13"	August 6, 2009	6.44
364	14	"Episode 14"	August 9, 2009	7.15
365	15	"Episode 15"	August 11, 2009	6.78
366	16	"Episode 16"	August 13, 2009	7.48
367	17	"Episode 17"	August 16, 2009	7.64
368	18	"Episode 18"	August 18, 2009	7.98
369	19	"Episode 19"	August 20, 2009	6.75
370	20	"Episode 20"	August 23, 2009	7.48
371	21	"Episode 21"	August 25, 2009	7.27
372	22	"Episode 22"	August 27, 2009	7.79
373	23	"Episode 23"	August 30, 2009	7.44
374	24	"Episode 24"	September 1, 2009	7.79
375	25	"Episode 25"	September 3, 2009	6.81
376	26	"Episode 26"	September 6, 2009	5.99
377	27	"Episode 27"	September 8, 2009	7.89
378	28	"Episode 28"	September 10, 2009	7.44
379	29	"Episode 29"	September 13, 2009	6.59
380	30	"Episode 30"	September 15, 2009	7.78
