= List of Big Brother (American TV series) episodes (2020–present) =

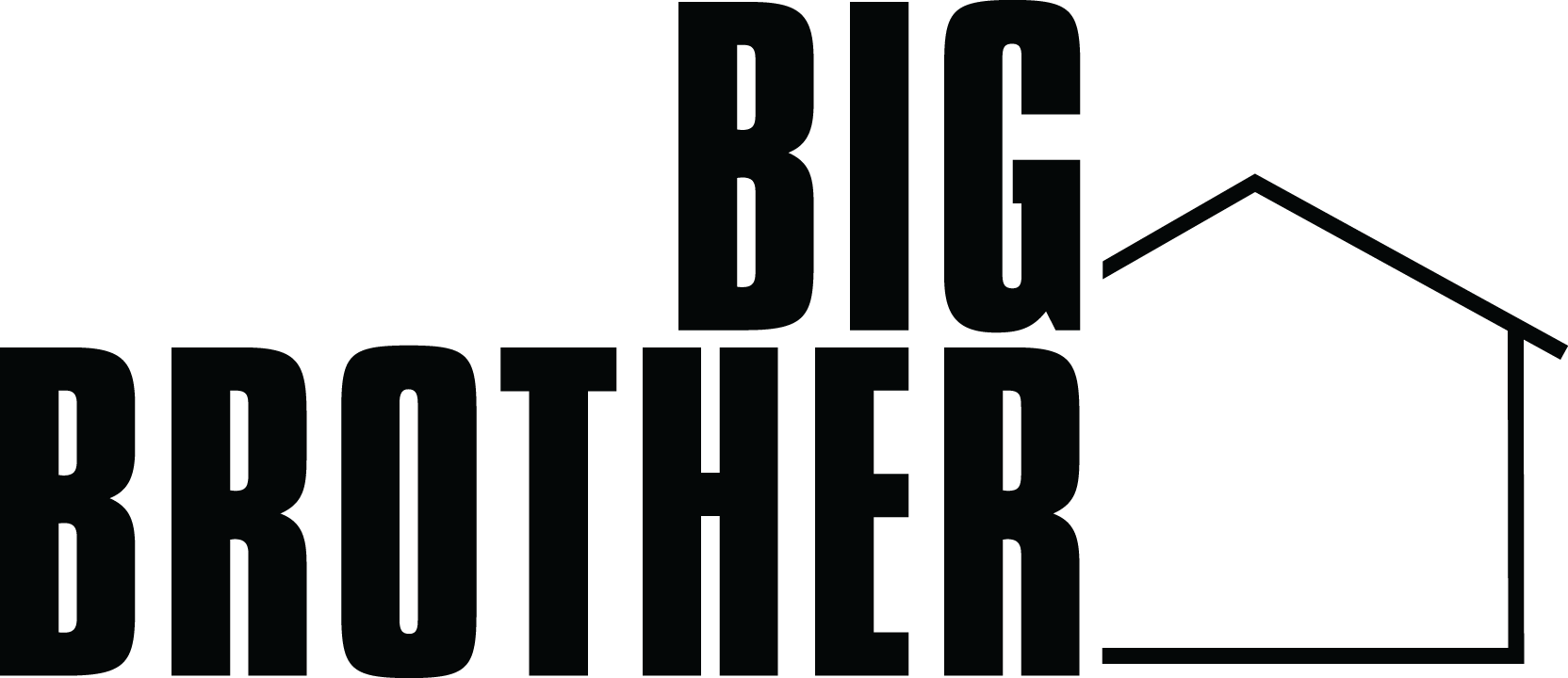

Big Brother is an American reality television series based on the Dutch television series of the same name created by John de Mol Jr. in 1997. The series premiered on July 5, 2000. The series follows a group of contestants, known as HouseGuests, who live together in a custom–built home under constant surveillance. The HouseGuests are completely isolated from the outside world and generally have no communication from the outside world. In the first season, HouseGuests would nominate two of their fellow HouseGuests. The two HouseGuests with the most votes would be "marked for banishment" and the public then voted on whom to "banish" from the house. When three HouseGuests remained, the public voted on the winner. Despite an initial successful start, ratings and critical reaction continued to grow increasingly negative. This led to the second season being a revamp of the show featuring a more competition–based challenge. Starting with the second season, HouseGuests compete in a series of competitions to win power and safety, they then vote to "evict" one of their own until there are only two HouseGuests remaining. In finale episodes, previous HouseGuests vote on who they think they should win the game, with the HouseGuest who receives the most votes being declared the winner and receiving the grand prize.

As of August 27, 2026, 1,016 episodes of Big Brother have aired, currently in its twenty-eighth season.

== Series overview ==
Season	Episodes	Originally released			Days	HouseGuests	Winner	Runner–up	America's Favorite	Final vote	Average viewers (millions)
Season	Episodes	First released	Last released	Network	Days	HouseGuests	Winner	Runner–up	America's Favorite	Final vote	Average viewers (millions)
1	70	July 5, 2000	September 29, 2000	CBS	88	10	Eddie McGee	Josh Souza	—N/a	59–27–14% (Note: For the first season and Over the Top, the public voted to determine the winner between the three finalists. The voting percentages were not revealed for Over the Top; however, it was revealed that the margin of victory was within 20,000 votes between the winner and the first runner–up.)	9.01
2	30	July 5, 2001	September 20, 2001	CBS	82	12	Will Kirby	Nicole Schaffrich	—N/a	5–2	7.90
3	33	July 10, 2002	September 25, 2002	CBS	82	12	Lisa Donahue	Danielle Reyes	—N/a	9–1	8.70
4	33	July 8, 2003	September 24, 2003	CBS	82	13	Jun Song	Alison Irwin	—N/a	6–1	8.80
5	31	July 6, 2004	September 21, 2004	CBS	82	14	Drew Daniel	Michael Ellis	—N/a	4–3	8.30
6	30	July 7, 2005	September 20, 2005	CBS	80	14	Maggie Ausburn	Ivette Corredero	—N/a	4–3	7.24
7 (Note: Also known as Big Brother: All Stars)	28	July 6, 2006	September 12, 2006	CBS	72	14	Mike "Boogie" Malin	Erika Landin	Janelle Pierzina	6–1	7.56
8	33	July 5, 2007	September 18, 2007	CBS	81	14	Dick Donato	Daniele Donato	—N/a	5–2	7.52
9 (Note: Also known as Big Brother: 'Til Death Do You Part)	33	February 12, 2008	April 27, 2008	CBS	81	16	Adam Jasinski	Ryan Quicksall	James Zinkand	6–1	6.56
10	29	July 13, 2008	September 16, 2008	CBS	71	13	Dan Gheesling	Memphis Garrett	Keesha Smith	7–0	6.72
11	30	July 9, 2009	September 15, 2009	CBS	73	13	Jordan Lloyd	Natalie Martinez	Jeff Schroeder	5–2	7.19
12	30	July 8, 2010	September 15, 2010	CBS	75	13	Hayden Moss	Lane Elenburg	Britney Haynes	4–3	7.76
13	29	July 7, 2011	September 14, 2011	CBS	75	14	Rachel Reilly	Porsche Briggs	Jeff Schroeder	4–3	7.95
14	30	July 12, 2012	September 19, 2012	CBS	75	16	Ian Terry	Dan Gheesling	Frank Eudy	6–1	6.79
15	36	June 26, 2013	September 18, 2013	CBS	90	16	Andy Herren	GinaMarie Zimmerman	Elissa Slater	7–2	6.47
16	40	June 25, 2014	September 24, 2014	CBS	97	16	Derrick Levasseur	Cody Calafiore	Donny Thompson	7–2	6.41
17	40	June 24, 2015	September 23, 2015	CBS	98	17	Steve Moses	Liz Nolan	James Huling	6–3	6.18
18	42	June 22, 2016	September 21, 2016	CBS	99	16	Nicole Franzel	Paul Abrahamian	Victor Arroyo	5–4	5.78
OTT	10 (Note: Although technically containing 11 episodes, the two episodes between episode 5 and episode 7 were officially numbered 6.1 and 6.2, leaving the official episode number at 10.)	September 28, 2016	December 1, 2016	CBS All Access	65	13	Morgan Willett	Jason Roy	—N/a	America's Vote	—N/a
19	39	June 28, 2017	September 20, 2017	CBS	92	17	Josh Martinez	Paul Abrahamian	Cody Nickson	5–4	6.06
20	40	June 27, 2018	September 26, 2018	CBS	99	16	Kaycee Clark	Tyler Crispen	Tyler Crispen	5–4	5.41
21	40	June 25, 2019	September 25, 2019	CBS	99	16	Jackson Michie	Holly Allen	Nicole Anthony	6–3	4.38
22	37	August 5, 2020	October 28, 2020	CBS	85	16	Cody Calafiore	Enzo Palumbo	Da'Vonne Rogers	9–0	3.97
23	37	July 7, 2021	September 29, 2021	CBS	85	16	Xavier Prather	Derek Frazier	Tiffany Mitchell	9–0	3.72
24	35	July 6, 2022	September 25, 2022	CBS	82	16	Taylor Hale	Monte Taylor	Taylor Hale	8–1	3.66
25	42	August 2, 2023	November 9, 2023	CBS	100	17	Jagateshwar "Jag" Bains	Matt Klotz	Cameron Hardin	5–2	3.04
RG	6	December 11, 2023	December 21, 2023	CBS	6	9	Nicole Franzel	Taylor Hale	—N/a	—N/a (Note: For the Reindeer Games, the winner was determined by a competition tournament between the four finalists, not a jury vote like in official Big Brother seasons.)	1.88
26	39	July 17, 2024	October 13, 2024	CBS	90	16	Chelsie Baham	Makensy Manbeck	Tucker Des Lauriers	7–0	2.79
27	39	July 10, 2025	September 28, 2025	CBS	83	17	Ashley Hollis	Vince Panaro	Keanu Soto	6–1	3.20
28 (Note: Also known as Big Brother: Time Trip)	41	July 9, 2026	October 1, 2026	CBS	87	17	TBA	TBA	TBA	TBA	TBA

== Episodes ==
=== Season 22 (2020) ===
No. overall	No. in season	Title	Day(s)	Original release date	U.S. viewers (millions)	Rating (18–49)
Week 1
747	1	"Episode 1"	Day 1	August 5, 2020	3.64	1.0
748	2	"Episode 2"	Days 1–3	August 9, 2020	2.95	0.8
749	3	"Episode 3"	Days 3–6	August 12, 2020	4.11	1.1
750	4	"Episode 4"	Days 6–9	August 13, 2020	4.02	1.0
Week 2
751	5	"Episode 5"	Days 9–10	August 16, 2020	3.91	1.0
752	6	"Episode 6"	Days 10–13	August 19, 2020	3.85	1.0
753	7	"Episode 7"	Days 13–16	August 20, 2020	3.91	1.0
Week 3
754	8	"Episode 8"	Days 16–17	August 23, 2020	4.12	1.0
755	9	"Episode 9"	Days 17–20	August 26, 2020	4.22	1.1
756	10	"Episode 10"	Days 20–23	August 27, 2020	3.99	1.0
Week 4
757	11	"Episode 11"	Days 23–24	August 30, 2020	3.81	0.9
758	12	"Episode 12"	Days 24–27	September 2, 2020	4.16	1.1
759	13	"Episode 13"	Days 27–30	September 3, 2020	4.22	1.1
Week 5
760	14	"Episode 14"	TBA	September 6, 2020	3.65	0.8
761	15	"Episode 15"	TBA	September 9, 2020	4.08	1.1
762	16	"Episode 16"	TBA	September 10, 2020	4.07	1.1
Week 6
763	17	"Episode 17"	TBA	September 13, 2020	4.14	1.1
764	18	"Episode 18"	TBA	September 15, 2020	4.13	1.1
765	19	"Episode 19"	TBA	September 17, 2020	4.09	1.0
Week 7
766	20	"Episode 20"	TBA	September 20, 2020	4.26	1.1
767	21	"Episode 21"	TBA	September 23, 2020	4.17	1.2
768	22	"Episode 22"	TBA	September 24, 2020	4.21	1.1
Week 8
769	23	"Episode 23"	TBA	September 27, 2020	4.15	1.0
770	24	"Episode 24"	TBA	September 30, 2020	4.27	1.0
771	25	"Episode 25"	TBA	October 1, 2020	4.34	1.2
Week 9
772	26	"Episode 26"	TBA	October 5, 2020	3.39	0.9
773	27	"Episode 27"	TBA	October 7, 2020	4.10	1.0
774	28	"Episode 28"	TBA	October 8, 2020	3.99	1.0
Week 10
775	29	"Episode 29"	TBA	October 12, 2020	4.03	1.0
776	30	"Episode 30"	TBA	October 14, 2020	4.19	1.0
777	31	"Episode 31"	TBA	October 15, 2020	4.01	1.0
Week 11
778	32	"Episode 32"	TBA	October 19, 2020	3.75	0.9
779	33	"Episode 33"	TBA	October 21, 2020	4.18	1.0
780	34	"Episode 34"	Day 74	October 22, 2020	4.12	1.0
Week 12
781	35	"Episode 35"	Day 79; Various (Note: In Episode 35, the final three HouseGuests looked back over their time in the Big Brother house. Flashbacks included clips from previous Days in the house, while the current Day in the house was 79.)	October 23, 2020	3.02	0.6
782	36	"Episode 36"	Day 80–84	October 26, 2020	3.86	1.0
783	37	"Episode 37"	Day 85	October 28, 2020	3.91	1.1

=== Season 23 (2021) ===
No. overall	No. in season	Title	Day(s)	Original release date	U.S. viewers (millions)	Rating (18–49)
Week 1
784	1	"Episode 1"	Day 1	July 7, 2021	4.25	1.1
785	2	"Episode 2"	Days 1–3	July 11, 2021	3.76	0.9
786	3	"Episode 3"	Days 3–6	July 14, 2021	3.63	0.8
787	4	"Episode 4"	Days 6–9	July 15, 2021	3.81	0.9
Week 2
788	5	"Episode 5"	Days 9–10	July 18, 2021	3.49	0.8
789	6	"Episode 6"	Days 10–13	July 21, 2021	3.50	0.8
790	7	"Episode 7"	Days 13–16	July 22, 2021	3.87	0.9
Week 3
791	8	"Episode 8"	Days 16–17	July 25, 2021	3.31	0.8
792	9	"Episode 9"	Days 17–20	July 28, 2021	3.79	1.0
793	10	"Episode 10"	Days 20–23	July 29, 2021	3.86	0.9
Week 4
794	11	"Episode 11"	Days 23–24	August 1, 2021	3.40	0.9
795	12	"Episode 12"	Days 24–27	August 4, 2021	3.64	0.9
796	13	"Episode 13"	Days 27–30	August 5, 2021	3.73	0.9
Week 5
797	14	"Episode 14"	Days 30–31	August 8, 2021	3.97	1.1
798	15	"Episode 15"	Days 31–34	August 11, 2021	3.96	0.9
799	16	"Episode 16"	Days 34–37	August 12, 2021	3.85	0.9
Week 6
800	17	"Episode 17"	Days 37–38	August 15, 2021	3.78	1.0
801	18	"Episode 18"	Days 38–41	August 18, 2021	3.80	0.9
802	19	"Episode 19"	Days 41–44	August 19, 2021	4.04	1.0
Week 7
803	20	"Episode 20"	Days 44–45	August 22, 2021	3.92	1.1
804	21	"Episode 21"	Days 45–48	August 25, 2021	3.80	1.0
805	22	"Episode 22"	Days 48–51	August 26, 2021	3.98	1.0
Week 8
806	23	"Episode 23"	Days 51–52	August 29, 2021	4.11	1.0
807	24	"Episode 24"	Days 52–55	September 1, 2021	4.01	1.0
808	25	"Episode 25"	Days 55–58	September 2, 2021	4.10	0.9
Week 9
809	26	"Episode 26"	Days 58–59	September 5, 2021	3.36	0.8
810	27	"Episode 27"	Days 59–62	September 8, 2021	3.89	0.9
811	28	"Episode 28"	Days 62–65	September 9, 2021	3.85	0.9
Week 10
812	29	"Episode 29"	Days 65–66	September 12, 2021	4.22	1.0
813	30	"Episode 30"	Days 66–69	September 15, 2021	4.08	0.9
814	31	"Episode 31"	Days 69–71	September 16, 2021	3.91	0.9
Week 11
815	32	"Episode 32"	Days 71–72	September 17, 2021	3.33	0.6
816	33	"Episode 33"	Days 72–74	September 22, 2021	2.89	0.6
817	34	"Episode 34"	Days 74–79	September 23, 2021	3.64	0.8
Week 12
818	35	"Episode 35"	Day 79; Various (Note: In Episode 35, the final three HouseGuests looked back over their time in the Big Brother house. Flashbacks included clips from previous Days in the house, while the current Day in the house was 79.)	September 24, 2021	2.71	0.5
819	36	"Episode 36"	Days 79–80	September 26, 2021	3.82	0.9
820	37	"Episode 37"	Days 81–85	September 29, 2021	3.57	0.9

=== Season 24 (2022) ===
No. overall	No. in season	Title	Day(s)	Original release date	U.S. viewers (millions)	Rating (18–49)
Week 1
821	1	"Episode 1"	Day 1	July 6, 2022	3.84	0.8
822	2	"Episode 2"	Days 1–3	July 10, 2022	3.41	0.7
823	3	"Episode 3"	Days 3–6	July 13, 2022	3.46	0.7
824	4	"Episode 4"	Days 6–9	July 14, 2022	3.21	0.7
Week 2
825	5	"Episode 5"	Days 8–10	July 17, 2022	3.34	0.6
826	6	"Episode 6"	Days 10–13	July 20, 2022	3.54	0.7
827	7	"Episode 7"	Days 10, 13–17	July 24, 2022 (Note: Episode 7 was originally scheduled to air on July 21, 2022. However, it was pre-empted for the January 6 United States Capitol attack hearings and rescheduled to July 22. It was later moved once more to July 24 to air in a two-hour timeslot with Episode 8.)	3.36	0.7
828	8	"Episode 8"	Days 10, 13–17	July 24, 2022	3.36	0.7
Week 3
829	9	"Episode 9"	Days 17–20	July 27, 2022	3.77	0.8
830	10	"Episode 10"	Days 20–23	July 28, 2022	3.56	0.8
Week 4
831	11	"Episode 11"	Days 20, 22–24	July 31, 2022	4.07	0.8
832	12	"Episode 12"	Days 24–27	August 3, 2022	3.83	0.8
833	13	"Episode 13"	Days 27–30	August 4, 2022	3.60	0.7
Week 5
834	14	"Episode 14"	Days 30–31	August 7, 2022	3.96	0.8
835	15	"Episode 15"	Days 31–34	August 10, 2022	3.86	0.8
836	16	"Episode 16"	Days 27, 30, 34–37	August 11, 2022	3.63	0.8
Week 6
837	17	"Episode 17"	Days 37–38	August 14, 2022	3.95	0.8
838	18	"Episode 18"	Days 38–40	August 17, 2022	4.06	0.9
839	19	"Episode 19"	Days 40–44	August 18, 2022	3.41	0.7
Week 7
840	20	"Episode 20"	Days 44–45	August 21, 2022	3.95	0.8
841	21	"Episode 21"	Days 45–48	August 24, 2022	3.99	0.9
842	22	"Episode 22"	Days 48–51	August 25, 2022	3.52	0.8
Week 8
843	23	"Episode 23"	Days 51–52	August 28, 2022	4.01	0.8
844	24	"Episode 24"	Days 52–54	August 31, 2022	3.80	0.8
845	25	"Episode 25"	Days 54–58	September 1, 2022	3.68	0.8
Week 9
846	26	"Episode 26"	Days 58–59	September 4, 2022	3.27	0.5
847	27	"Episode 27"	Days 59–62	September 7, 2022	3.83	0.8
848	28	"Episode 28"	Days 62–65	September 8, 2022	3.17	0.7
Week 10
849	29	"Episode 29"	Days 65–66	September 11, 2022	4.05	0.8
850	30	"Episode 30"	Days 66–69	September 14, 2022	3.85	0.8
851	31	"Episode 31"	Days 69–72	September 15, 2022	3.33	0.7
Week 11
852	32	"Episode 32"	Days 72–73	September 18, 2022	4.47	0.9
853	33	"Episode 33"	Days 73–79	September 22, 2022	3.14	0.6
Week 12
854	34	"Episode 34"	Day 79; Various (Note: In Episode 34, the final three HouseGuests looked back over their time in the Big Brother house. Flashbacks included clips from previous days in the house, while the current day in the house was 79.)	September 23, 2022	2.39	0.4
855	35	"Episode 35"	Days 79–82	September 25, 2022	4.03	0.8

=== Season 25 (2023) ===
No. overall	No. in season	Title	Day(s)	Timeslot (ET)	Original release date	U.S. viewers (millions)	Rating (18–49)
Week 1
856	1	"Episode 1"	Day 1	Wednesday 8:00 p.m.	August 2, 2023	3.41	0.7
857	2	"Episode 2"	Days 1–3	Sunday 8:00 p.m.	August 6, 2023	3.35	0.7
858	3	"Episode 3"	Days 3–6	Wednesday 8:00 p.m.	August 9, 2023	3.26	0.6
859	4	"Episode 4"	Days 6–9	Thursday 9:01 p.m.	August 10, 2023	2.85	0.6
Week 2
860	5	"Episode 5"	Days 9–10	Sunday 8:00 p.m.	August 13, 2023	2.89	0.6
861	6	"Episode 6"	Days 10–13	Wednesday 8:00 p.m.	August 16, 2023	3.23	0.6
862	7	"Episode 7"	Days 13–16	Thursday 9:01 p.m.	August 17, 2023	3.07	0.6
Week 3
863	8	"Episode 8"	Days 16–17	Sunday 8:00 p.m.	August 20, 2023	3.24	0.6
864	9	"Episode 9"	Days 17–20	Wednesday 8:00 p.m.	August 23, 2023	3.29	0.6
865	10	"Episode 10"	Days 20–23	Thursday 9:01 p.m.	August 24, 2023	3.02	0.6
Week 4
866	11	"Episode 11"	Days 23–24	Sunday 8:00 p.m.	August 27, 2023	3.18	0.6
867	12	"Episode 12"	Days 24–27	Wednesday 8:00 p.m.	August 30, 2023	3.33	0.6
868	13	"Episode 13"	Days 27–30	Thursday 9:01 p.m.	August 31, 2023	3.14	0.6
Week 5
869	14	"Episode 14"	Days 30–31	Sunday 8:00 p.m.	September 3, 2023	2.99	0.6
870	15	"Episode 15"	Days 31–34	Wednesday 8:00 p.m.	September 6, 2023	3.28	0.7
871	16	"Episode 16"	Days 34–37	Thursday 9:01 p.m.	September 7, 2023	2.90	0.6
Week 6
872	17	"Episode 17"	Days 37–38	Sunday 8:30 p.m.	September 10, 2023	3.74	0.8
873	18	"Episode 18"	Days 38–41	Wednesday 8:00 p.m.	September 13, 2023	3.51	0.8
874	19	"Episode 19"	Days 41–44	Thursday 8:00 p.m.	September 14, 2023	3.21	0.6
Week 7
875	20	"Episode 20"	Days 44–45	Sunday 10:29 p.m.	September 17, 2023	2.78	0.5
876	21	"Episode 21"	Days 45–48	Wednesday 8:00 p.m.	September 20, 2023	3.48	0.7
877	22	"Episode 22"	Days 48–51	Thursday 8:00 p.m.	September 21, 2023	3.48	0.7
Week 8
878	23	"Episode 23"	Days 51–52	Sunday 9:59 p.m.	September 24, 2023	2.61	0.5
879	24	"Episode 24"	Days 52–58	Thursday 9:00 p.m.	September 28, 2023	2.78	0.5
Week 9
880	25	"Episode 25"	Days 58–59	Sunday 9:59 p.m.	October 1, 2023	2.48	0.4
881	26	"Episode 26"	Days 59–62	Tuesday 8:00 p.m.	October 3, 2023	3.08	0.4
882	27	"Episode 27"	Days 62–65	Thursday 9:00 p.m.	October 5, 2023	2.91	0.6
Week 10
883	28	"Episode 28"	Days 65–66	Sunday 9:59 p.m.	October 8, 2023	2.75	0.4
884	29	"Episode 29"	Days 66–68	Tuesday 8:00 p.m.	October 10, 2023	3.15	0.6
885	30	"Episode 30"	Days 68–72	Thursday 9:00 p.m.	October 12, 2023	2.75	0.5
Week 11
886	31	"Episode 31"	Days 72–73	Sunday 9:59 p.m.	October 15, 2023	2.37	0.4
887	32	"Episode 32"	Days 73–76	Tuesday 8:00 p.m.	October 17, 2023	3.13	0.5
888	33	"Episode 33"	Days 76–79	Thursday 9:20 p.m.	October 19, 2023	2.65	0.5
Week 12
889	34	"Episode 34"	Days 79–80	Sunday 9:59 p.m.	October 22, 2023	2.54	0.4
890	35	"Episode 35"	Days 80–83	Tuesday 8:00 p.m.	October 24, 2023	3.10	0.5
891	36	"Episode 36"	Days 83–86	Thursday 9:00 p.m.	October 26, 2023	2.95	0.5
Week 13
892	37	"Episode 37"	Days 86–87	Sunday 9:59 p.m.	October 29, 2023	2.89	0.5
893	38	"Episode 38"	Days 87–90	Tuesday 8:00 p.m.	October 31, 2023	3.13	0.5
894	39	"Episode 39"	Days 90–93	Thursday 9:01 p.m.	November 2, 2023	2.82	0.5
Week 14
895	40	"Episode 40"	Days 93–96	Sunday 9:59 p.m.	November 5, 2023	2.49	0.4
896	41	"Episode 41"	Day 96; Various (Note: In Episode 41, the final three HouseGuests looked back over their time in the Big Brother house. Flashbacks included clips from previous days in the house, while the current day in the house was 96.)	Tuesday 8:00 p.m.	November 7, 2023	2.83	0.5
897	42	"Episode 42"	Days 96–100	Thursday 8:00 p.m.	November 9, 2023	3.43	0.7

=== Reindeer Games (2023) ===
No.	Title	Original release date	U.S. viewers (millions)	Rating/share (18–49)
1	"Episode 1"	December 11, 2023	1.53	0.26/2
2	"Episode 2"	December 12, 2023	1.59	0.23/3
3	"Episode 3"	December 14, 2023	2.04	0.30/3
4	"Episode 4"	December 18, 2023	1.78	0.28/3
5	"Episode 5"	December 19, 2023	2.03	0.30/3
6	"Episode 6"	December 21, 2023	2.29	0.32/3

=== Season 26 (2024) ===
No. overall	No. in season	Title	Day(s)	Timeslot (ET)	Original release date	U.S. viewers (millions)	Rating (18–49)
Week 1
898	1	"Episode 1"	Day 1	Wednesday 9:00 p.m.	July 17, 2024	2.75	0.6
899	2	"Episode 2"	Day 1	Thursday 9:00 p.m.	July 18, 2024	2.36	0.5
900	3	"Episode 3"	Days 1–4	Sunday 9:00 p.m.	July 21, 2024	2.39	0.5
901	4	"Episode 4"	Days 4–7	Wednesday 9:00 p.m.	July 24, 2024	2.51	0.5
902	5	"Episode 5"	Days 7–10	Thursday 8:00 p.m.	July 25, 2024	2.87	0.6
Week 2
903	6	"Episode 6"	Days 7, 10–11	Sunday 8:58 p.m.	July 28, 2024	2.40	0.5
904	7	"Episode 7"	Days 11–14	Wednesday 8:00 p.m.	July 31, 2024	2.72	0.5
905	8	"Episode 8"	Days 14–17	Thursday 8:00 p.m.	August 1, 2024	2.76	0.5
Week 3
906	9	"Episode 9"	Days 11, 15, 17–18	Sunday 8:58 p.m.	August 4, 2024	2.33	0.5
907	10	"Episode 10"	Days 12, 18–21	Wednesday 8:00 p.m.	August 7, 2024	2.97	0.6
908	11	"Episode 11"	Days 21–24	Thursday 8:00 p.m.	August 8, 2024	3.15	0.7
Week 4
909	12	"Episode 12"	Days 24–25	Sunday 10:32 p.m. (Note: "Episode 12" was originally scheduled to air at 8:58 p.m. but was delayed to 10:32 due to overrun of the 2024 Wyndham Championship.)	August 11, 2024	2.20	0.3
910	13	"Episode 13"	N/A (Note: This episode showcased events from the previous days in the season. No new or present days were featured.)	Tuesday 8:00 p.m.	August 13, 2024	2.28	0.3
911	14	"Episode 14"	Days 4–5, 25–28	Wednesday 8:00 p.m.	August 14, 2024	3.25	0.6
912	15	"Episode 15"	Days 13, 24, 28–31	Thursday 8:00 p.m.	August 15, 2024	3.49	0.6
Week 5
913	16	"Episode 16"	Days 31–32	Sunday 8:58 p.m.	August 18, 2024	2.72	0.6
914	17	"Episode 17"	Days 31–35	Wednesday 8:00 p.m.	August 21, 2024	3.02	0.6
915	18	"Episode 18"	Days 35–38	Thursday 8:00 p.m.	August 22, 2024	2.96	0.6
Week 6
916	19	"Episode 19"	Days 38–39	Sunday 9:33 p.m. (Note: "Episode 19" was originally scheduled to air at 9:30 p.m. but was delayed to 9:33 due to overrun of an NFL preseason game.)	August 25, 2024	2.76	0.5
917	20	"Episode 20"	Days 39–42	Wednesday 8:00 p.m.	August 28, 2024	2.93	0.5
918	21	"Episode 21"	Days 42–45	Thursday 8:00 p.m.	August 29, 2024	3.18	0.6
Week 7
919	22	"Episode 22"	Days 45–46	Sunday 8:58 p.m.	September 1, 2024	2.41	0.4
920	23	"Episode 23"	Days 46–49	Wednesday 8:00 p.m.	September 4, 2024	3.19	0.6
921	24	"Episode 24"	Days 49–52	Thursday 8:00 p.m.	September 5, 2024	3.09	0.6
Week 8
922	25	"Episode 25"	Days 52–53	Sunday 8:58 p.m.	September 8, 2024	2.96	0.6
923	26	"Episode 26"	Days 53–56	Wednesday 8:00 p.m.	September 11, 2024	3.20	0.6
924	27	"Episode 27"	Days 56–59	Thursday 8:00 p.m.	September 12, 2024	3.17	0.6
Week 9
925	28	"Episode 28"	Days 59–60	Sunday 9:33 p.m. (Note: "Episode 28" was originally scheduled to air at 9:30 p.m. but was delayed to 9:33 due to overrun of an NFL game.)	September 15, 2024	2.82	0.6
926	29	"Episode 29"	Days 60–63	Wednesday 10:00 p.m.	September 18, 2024	2.39	0.5
927	30	"Episode 30"	Days 63–66	Thursday 8:00 p.m.	September 19, 2024	3.07	0.6
Week 10
928	31	"Episode 31"	Days 65, 66–67	Sunday 9:00 p.m.	September 22, 2024	2.90	0.5
929	32	"Episode 32"	Days 67–70	Wednesday 9:29 p.m.	September 25, 2024	2.44	0.5
930	33	"Episode 33"	Days 70–73	Thursday 8:00 p.m.	September 26, 2024	3.12	0.6
Week 11
931	34	"Episode 34"	Days 73–74	Sunday 10:30 p.m.	September 29, 2024	2.33	0.3
932	35	"Episode 35"	Days 74–80	Thursday 8:00 p.m.	October 3, 2024	2.92	0.5
Week 12
933	36	"Episode 36"	Days 80–81	Sunday 10:00 p.m.	October 6, 2024	2.60	0.5
934	37	"Episode 37"	Days 81–87	Thursday 8:00 p.m.	October 10, 2024	2.94	0.5
Week 13
935	38	"Episode 38"	Various; Day 87	Friday 8:00 p.m.	October 11, 2024	1.95	0.3
936	39	"Episode 39"	Days 87–90	Sunday 9:00 p.m.	October 13, 2024	3.19	0.7

=== Season 27 (2025) ===
No. overall	No. in season	Title	Day(s)	Timeslot (ET)	Original release date	U.S. viewers (millions)	Rating (18–49)
Week 1
937	1	"Episode 1"	Day 1	Thursday 8:00 p.m.	July 10, 2025	3.18	0.6
938	2	"Episode 2"	Days 1–4	Sunday 8:00 p.m.	July 13, 2025	2.73	0.5
939	3	"Episode 3"	Days 4–7	Wednesday 8:00 p.m.	July 16, 2025	3.01	0.6
940	4	"Episode 4"	Days 7–10	Thursday 8:00 p.m.	July 17, 2025	3.17	0.7
Week 2
941	5	"Episode 5"	Days 10–11	Sunday 8:00 p.m.	July 20, 2025	3.06	0.6
942	6	"Episode 6"	Days 8, 11–14	Wednesday 8:00 p.m.	July 23, 2025	2.93	0.6
943	7	"Episode 7"	Days 14–17	Thursday 8:00 p.m.	July 24, 2025	3.00	0.5
Week 3
944	8	"Big Brother: Unlocked 7/25/25"	N/A (Note: This episode showcased events from the previous days in the season. No new or present days were featured.)	Friday 8:00 p.m.	July 25, 2025	1.53	0.2
945	9	"Episode 9"	Days 9, 16–18	Sunday 8:00 p.m.	July 27, 2025	3.04	0.5
946	10	"Episode 10"	Days 16–21	Wednesday 8:00 p.m.	July 30, 2025	3.02	0.6
947	11	"Episode 11"	Days 21–24	Thursday 8:00 p.m.	July 31, 2025	2.96	0.6
Week 4
948	12	"Episode 12"	Days 2, 24–25	Sunday 8:00 p.m.	August 3, 2025	3.18	0.6
949	13	"Episode 13"	Days 21, 25–28	Wednesday 8:00 p.m.	August 6, 2025	3.01	0.6
950	14	"Episode 14"	Days 28–31	Thursday 8:00 p.m.	August 7, 2025	3.17	0.6
Week 5
951	15	"Big Brother: Unlocked 8/8/25"	N/A	Friday 8:00 p.m.	August 8, 2025	1.44	0.2
952	16	"Episode 16"	Days 24, 30–32	Sunday 8:00 p.m.	August 10, 2025	3.32	0.6
953	17	"Episode 17"	Days 28, 32–35	Wednesday 8:00 p.m.	August 13, 2025	3.13	0.6
954	18	"Episode 18"	Days 35–38	Thursday 8:00 p.m.	August 14, 2025	3.37	0.6
Week 6
955	19	"Episode 19"	Days 38–39	Sunday 8:00 p.m.	August 17, 2025	3.47	0.8
956	20	"Episode 20"	Days 39–42	Wednesday 8:00 p.m.	August 20, 2025	3.04	0.6
957	21	"Episode 21"	Days 2, 36, 42–45	Thursday 8:00 p.m.	August 21, 2025	3.18	0.7
Week 7
958	22	"Episode 22" (Note: This episode included an embedded installment of Big Brother: Unlocked that was originally scheduled to air independently on August 22.)	Days 31, 42, 45–46	Sunday 8:00 p.m.	August 24, 2025	3.20	0.7
959	23	"Episode 23"	Days 46–49	Wednesday 8:00 p.m.	August 27, 2025	3.45	0.8
960	24	"Episode 24"	Days 49–52	Thursday 8:00 p.m.	August 28, 2025	3.36	0.7
Week 8
961	25	"Episode 25"	Days 52–53	Sunday 8:00 p.m.	August 31, 2025	2.98	0.6
962	26	"Episode 26"	Days 53–56	Wednesday 8:00 p.m.	September 3, 2025	3.22	0.7
963	27	"Episode 27"	Days 56–59	Thursday 8:00 p.m.	September 4, 2025	3.43	0.7
Week 9
964	28	"Big Brother: Unlocked 9/5/25"	N/A	Friday 8:00 p.m.	September 5, 2025	1.71	0.2
965	29	"Episode 29"	Days 59–60	Tuesday 8:00 p.m.	September 9, 2025	3.35	0.7
966	30	"Episode 30"	Days 60–63	Wednesday 8:00 p.m.	September 10, 2025	3.21	0.7
967	31	"Episode 31"	Days 63–66	Thursday 8:00 p.m.	September 11, 2025	3.20	0.6
Week 10
968	32	"Episode 32"	Days 66–70	Wednesday 8:00 p.m.	September 17, 2025	3.11	0.6
969	33	"Episode 33"	Days 66–73	Thursday 8:00 p.m.	September 18, 2025	3.29	0.7
Week 11
970	34	"Big Brother: Unlocked 9/19/25"	N/A	Friday 8:00 p.m.	September 19, 2025	1.57	0.2
971	35	"Episode 35"	Days 73–74	Sunday 10:00 p.m.	September 21, 2025	2.01	0.4
972	36	"Episode 36"	Days 74–77	Wednesday 10:00 p.m.	September 24, 2025	2.33	0.4
973	37	"Episode 37"	Days 77–80	Thursday 8:00 p.m.	September 25, 2025	3.00	0.5
Week 12
974	38	"Episode 38"	Various; Day 80	Friday 8:00 p.m.	September 26, 2025	1.95	0.2
975	39	"Episode 39"	Days 80–83	Sunday 8:32 p.m. (Note: "Episode 39" was originally scheduled to air at 8:30 p.m., but was delayed to 8:32 due to overrun of an NFL game.)	September 28, 2025	4.25	1.0

=== Season 28 (2026) ===
No. overall	No. in season	Title	Day(s)	Timeslot (ET)	Original release date	U.S. viewers (millions)	Rating (18–49)
Week 1
976	1	"Episode 1"	Day 1	Thursday 8:00 p.m.	July 9, 2026	3.88	0.9
977	2	"Big Brother: Unlocked 7/10/26"	Day 1 (Note: This episode also showcased events from preseason interviews.)	Friday 8:00 p.m.	July 10, 2026	2.35	0.4
978	3	"Episode 3"	Days 1–4	Sunday 8:00 p.m.	July 12, 2026	2.92	0.6
979	4	"Episode 4"	Days 4–7	Wednesday 8:00 p.m.	July 15, 2026	3.29	0.7
980	5	"Episode 5"	Days 7–10	Thursday 8:00 p.m.	July 16, 2026	3.30	0.7
Week 2
981	6	"Episode 6"	Days 5, 10–11	Sunday 8:00 p.m.	July 19, 2026	3.11	0.6
982	7	"Episode 7"	Days 11–14	Wednesday 8:00 p.m.	July 22, 2026	3.18	0.6
983	8	"Episode 8"	Days 14–17	Thursday 8:00 p.m.	July 23, 2026	3.52	0.8
Week 3
984	9	"Big Brother: Unlocked 7/24/26"	Day 17, Various (Note: Flashbacks included clips from previous Days in the house)	Friday 8:00 p.m.	July 24, 2026	1.74	0.2
985	10	"Episode 10"	Days 17–18	Sunday 8:00 p.m.	July 26, 2026	3.31	0.6
986	11	"Episode 11"	Days 18–21	Wednesday 8:00 p.m.	July 29, 2026	3.29	0.6
987	12	"Episode 12"	Days 21–24	Thursday 8:00 p.m.	July 30, 2026	3.47	0.7
Week 4
988	13	"Episode 13"	Days 24–25	Sunday 8:00 p.m.	August 2, 2026	3.43	0.7
989	14	"Episode 14"	Days 25–28	Wednesday 8:00 p.m.	August 5, 2026	3.18	0.6
990	15	"Episode 15"	Days 28–31	Thursday 8:00 p.m.	August 6, 2026	3.48	0.7
Week 5
991	16	"Big Brother: Unlocked 8/07/26"	Day 31, Various	Friday 8:00 p.m.	August 7, 2026	1.77	0.2
992	17	"Episode 17"	Days 31–32	Sunday 8:00 p.m.	August 9, 2026	3.47	0.6
993	18	"Episode 18"	Days 32–35	Wednesday 8:00 p.m.	August 12, 2026	3.44	0.7
994	19	"Episode 19"	Days 35–38	Thursday 8:00 p.m.	August 13, 2026	3.52	0.8
Week 6
995	20	"Episode 20"	Days 38–39	Sunday 8:00 p.m.	August 16, 2026	3.37	0.7
996	21	"Episode 21"	Days 39–42	Wednesday 8:00 p.m.	August 19, 2026	3.35	0.7
997	22	"Episode 22"	Days 42–45	Thursday 8:00 p.m.	August 20, 2026	3.45	0.6
Week 7
998	23	"Episode 23" (Note: This episode included an embedded installment of Big Brother: Unlocked.)	Day 45–46, Various	Sunday 8:00 p.m.	August 23, 2026	3.09	0.6
999	24	"Episode 24"	Days 46–49	Wednesday 8:00 p.m.	August 26, 2026	3.22	0.7
1000	25	"Episode 25"	Days 49–52, Various (Note: In honor of the show's 1000th episode, clips from this season and past seasons were shown to viewers to reminisce notable moments.)	Thursday 8:00 p.m.	August 27, 2026	3.25	0.6
Week 8
1001	26	"Episode 26"	Days 52–53	Sunday 9:00 p.m	August 30, 2026	3.63	0.7
1002	27	"Episode 27"	Days 53–56	Wednesday 8:00 p.m.	September 2, 2026	3.32	0.7
1003	28	"Episode 28"	Days 56–59	Thursday 8:00 p.m.	September 3, 2026	3.62	0.7
Week 9
1004	29	"Big Brother: Unlocked 9/04/26"	Day 59, Various	Friday 8:00 p.m.	September 4, 2026	1.66	0.2
1005	30	"Episode 30"	Days 59–60	Sunday 8:00 p.m.	September 6, 2026	2.98	0.5
1006	31	"Episode 31"	Days 60–63	Wednesday 8:00 p.m.	September 9, 2026	3.21	0.6
1007	32	"Episode 32"	Days 63–66	Thursday 8:00 p.m.	September 10, 2026	3.53	0.7
Week 10
1008	33	"Episode 33"	Days 66–67	Sunday 8:30 p.m.	September 13, 2026	3.47	0.7
1009	34	"Episode 34"	Days 67–69	Wednesday 8:00 p.m.	September 16, 2026	3.08	0.6
1010	35	"Episode 35"	Days 69–73	Thursday 8:00 p.m.	September 17, 2026	3.38	0.7
Week 11
1011	36	"Big Brother: Unlocked 9/18/26"	Day 73, Various	Friday 9:00 p.m.	September 18, 2026	1.40	0.2
1012	37	"Episode 37"	Days 73–74	Sunday 8:00 p.m.	September 20, 2026	3.47	0.6
1013	38	"Episode 38"	Days 74–77	Wednesday 10:00 p.m.	September 23, 2026	TBD	TBA
1014	39	"Episode 39"	Days 77–80	Thursday 8:00 p.m.	September 24, 2026	TBD	TBA
Week 12
1015	40	"Episode 40"	Day 80; Various	Sunday 10:14 p.m. (Note: "Episode 40" was originally scheduled to air at 9:30 p.m., but was delayed to 10:14 due to overrun of afternoon NFL coverage.)	September 27, 2026	TBD	TBA
1016	41	"Episode 41"	TBA	Thursday 8:00 p.m.	October 1, 2026	TBD	TBA
