= List of Big Brother (American TV series) episodes (2010–2019) =

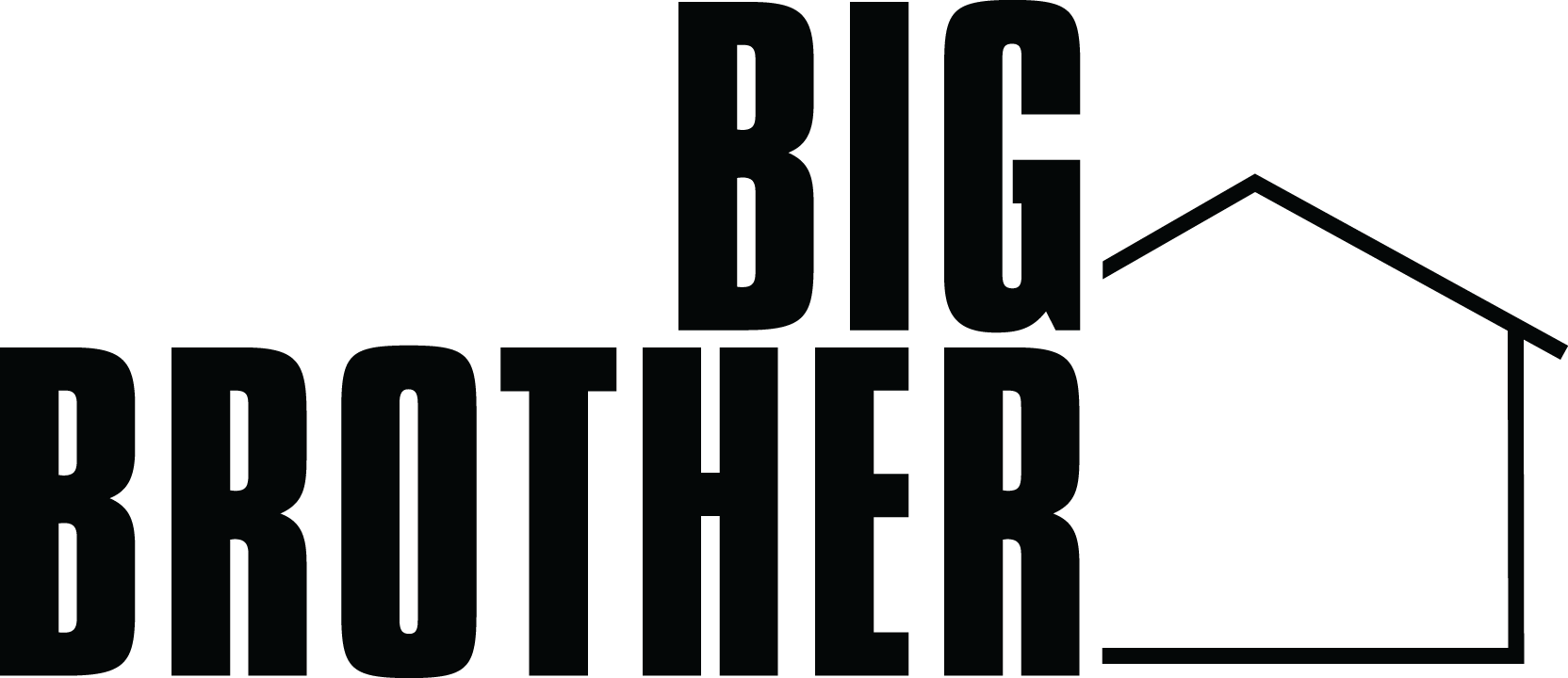

Big Brother is an American reality television series based on the Dutch television series of the same name created by John de Mol Jr. in 1997. The series premiered on July 5, 2000. The series follows a group of contestants, known as HouseGuests, who live together in a custom–built home under constant surveillance. The HouseGuests are completely isolated from the outside world and generally have no communication from the outside world. In the first season, HouseGuests would nominate two of their fellow HouseGuests. The two HouseGuests with the most votes would be "marked for banishment" and the public then voted on whom to "banish" from the house. When three HouseGuests remained, the public voted on the winner. Despite an initial successful start, ratings and critical reaction continued to grow increasingly negative. This led to the second season being a revamp of the show featuring a more competition–based challenge. Starting with the second season, HouseGuests compete in a series of competitions to win power and safety, they then vote to "evict" one of their own until there are only two HouseGuests remaining. In finale episodes, previous HouseGuests vote on who they think they should win the game, with the HouseGuest who receives the most votes being declared the winner and receiving the grand prize.

As of August 27, 2026, 1,016 episodes of Big Brother have aired, currently in its twenty-eighth season.

== Series overview ==
Season	Episodes	Originally released			Days	HouseGuests	Winner	Runner–up	America's Favorite	Final vote	Average viewers (millions)
Season	Episodes	First released	Last released	Network	Days	HouseGuests	Winner	Runner–up	America's Favorite	Final vote	Average viewers (millions)
1	70	July 5, 2000	September 29, 2000	CBS	88	10	Eddie McGee	Josh Souza	—N/a	59–27–14% (Note: For the first season and Over the Top, the public voted to determine the winner between the three finalists. The voting percentages were not revealed for Over the Top; however, it was revealed that the margin of victory was within 20,000 votes between the winner and the first runner–up.)	9.01
2	30	July 5, 2001	September 20, 2001	CBS	82	12	Will Kirby	Nicole Schaffrich	—N/a	5–2	7.90
3	33	July 10, 2002	September 25, 2002	CBS	82	12	Lisa Donahue	Danielle Reyes	—N/a	9–1	8.70
4	33	July 8, 2003	September 24, 2003	CBS	82	13	Jun Song	Alison Irwin	—N/a	6–1	8.80
5	31	July 6, 2004	September 21, 2004	CBS	82	14	Drew Daniel	Michael Ellis	—N/a	4–3	8.30
6	30	July 7, 2005	September 20, 2005	CBS	80	14	Maggie Ausburn	Ivette Corredero	—N/a	4–3	7.24
7 (Note: Also known as Big Brother: All Stars)	28	July 6, 2006	September 12, 2006	CBS	72	14	Mike "Boogie" Malin	Erika Landin	Janelle Pierzina	6–1	7.56
8	33	July 5, 2007	September 18, 2007	CBS	81	14	Dick Donato	Daniele Donato	—N/a	5–2	7.52
9 (Note: Also known as Big Brother: 'Til Death Do You Part)	33	February 12, 2008	April 27, 2008	CBS	81	16	Adam Jasinski	Ryan Quicksall	James Zinkand	6–1	6.56
10	29	July 13, 2008	September 16, 2008	CBS	71	13	Dan Gheesling	Memphis Garrett	Keesha Smith	7–0	6.72
11	30	July 9, 2009	September 15, 2009	CBS	73	13	Jordan Lloyd	Natalie Martinez	Jeff Schroeder	5–2	7.19
12	30	July 8, 2010	September 15, 2010	CBS	75	13	Hayden Moss	Lane Elenburg	Britney Haynes	4–3	7.76
13	29	July 7, 2011	September 14, 2011	CBS	75	14	Rachel Reilly	Porsche Briggs	Jeff Schroeder	4–3	7.95
14	30	July 12, 2012	September 19, 2012	CBS	75	16	Ian Terry	Dan Gheesling	Frank Eudy	6–1	6.79
15	36	June 26, 2013	September 18, 2013	CBS	90	16	Andy Herren	GinaMarie Zimmerman	Elissa Slater	7–2	6.47
16	40	June 25, 2014	September 24, 2014	CBS	97	16	Derrick Levasseur	Cody Calafiore	Donny Thompson	7–2	6.41
17	40	June 24, 2015	September 23, 2015	CBS	98	17	Steve Moses	Liz Nolan	James Huling	6–3	6.18
18	42	June 22, 2016	September 21, 2016	CBS	99	16	Nicole Franzel	Paul Abrahamian	Victor Arroyo	5–4	5.78
OTT	10 (Note: Although technically containing 11 episodes, the two episodes between episode 5 and episode 7 were officially numbered 6.1 and 6.2, leaving the official episode number at 10.)	September 28, 2016	December 1, 2016	CBS All Access	65	13	Morgan Willett	Jason Roy	—N/a	America's Vote	—N/a
19	39	June 28, 2017	September 20, 2017	CBS	92	17	Josh Martinez	Paul Abrahamian	Cody Nickson	5–4	6.06
20	40	June 27, 2018	September 26, 2018	CBS	99	16	Kaycee Clark	Tyler Crispen	Tyler Crispen	5–4	5.41
21	40	June 25, 2019	September 25, 2019	CBS	99	16	Jackson Michie	Holly Allen	Nicole Anthony	6–3	4.38
22	37	August 5, 2020	October 28, 2020	CBS	85	16	Cody Calafiore	Enzo Palumbo	Da'Vonne Rogers	9–0	3.97
23	37	July 7, 2021	September 29, 2021	CBS	85	16	Xavier Prather	Derek Frazier	Tiffany Mitchell	9–0	3.72
24	35	July 6, 2022	September 25, 2022	CBS	82	16	Taylor Hale	Monte Taylor	Taylor Hale	8–1	3.66
25	42	August 2, 2023	November 9, 2023	CBS	100	17	Jagateshwar "Jag" Bains	Matt Klotz	Cameron Hardin	5–2	3.04
RG	6	December 11, 2023	December 21, 2023	CBS	6	9	Nicole Franzel	Taylor Hale	—N/a	—N/a (Note: For the Reindeer Games, the winner was determined by a competition tournament between the four finalists, not a jury vote like in official Big Brother seasons.)	1.88
26	39	July 17, 2024	October 13, 2024	CBS	90	16	Chelsie Baham	Makensy Manbeck	Tucker Des Lauriers	7–0	2.79
27	39	July 10, 2025	September 28, 2025	CBS	83	17	Ashley Hollis	Vince Panaro	Keanu Soto	6–1	3.20
28 (Note: Also known as Big Brother: Time Trip)	41	July 9, 2026	October 1, 2026	CBS	87	17	TBA	TBA	TBA	TBA	TBA

== Episodes ==
=== Season 12 (2010) ===
No. overall	No. in season	Title	Original release date	U.S. viewers (millions)
381	1	"Episode 1"	July 8, 2010	7.35
382	2	"Episode 2"	July 11, 2010	7.04
383	3	"Episode 3"	July 14, 2010	6.38
384	4	"Episode 4"	July 15, 2010	7.10
385	5	"Episode 5"	July 18, 2010	6.92
386	6	"Episode 6"	July 21, 2010	6.50
387	7	"Episode 7"	July 22, 2010	6.74
388	8	"Episode 8"	July 25, 2010	7.19
389	9	"Episode 9"	July 28, 2010	6.71
390	10	"Episode 10"	July 29, 2010	6.52
391	11	"Episode 11"	August 1, 2010	7.11
392	12	"Episode 12"	August 4, 2010	6.97
393	13	"Episode 13"	August 5, 2010	7.14
394	14	"Episode 14"	August 8, 2010	7.56
395	15	"Episode 15"	August 11, 2010	7.09
396	16	"Episode 16"	August 12, 2010	7.24
397	17	"Episode 17"	August 15, 2010	7.46
398	18	"Episode 18"	August 18, 2010	7.61
399	19	"Episode 19"	August 19, 2010	7.55
400	20	"Episode 20"	August 22, 2010	7.73
401	21	"Episode 21"	August 25, 2010	7.99
402	22	"Episode 22"	August 26, 2010	7.87
403	23	"Episode 23"	August 29, 2010	7.80
404	24	"Episode 24"	September 1, 2010	7.87
405	25	"Episode 25"	September 2, 2010	6.54
406	26	"Episode 26"	September 5, 2010	7.19
407	27	"Episode 27"	September 8, 2010	7.82
408	28	"Episode 28"	September 9, 2010	7.83
409	29	"Episode 29"	September 12, 2010	6.66
410	30	"Episode 30"	September 15, 2010	7.86

=== Season 13 (2011) ===
No. overall	No. in season	Title	Original release date
411	1	"Episode 1"	July 7, 2011
412	2	"Episode 2"	July 10, 2011
413	3	"Episode 3"	July 13, 2011
414	4	"Episode 4"	July 14, 2011
415	5	"Episode 5"	July 17, 2011
416	6	"Episode 6"	July 20, 2011
417	7	"Episode 7"	July 21, 2011
418	8	"Episode 8"	July 24, 2011
419	9	"Episode 9"	July 27, 2011
420	10	"Episode 10"	July 28, 2011
421	11	"Episode 11"	July 31, 2011
422	12	"Episode 12"	August 3, 2011
423	13	"Episode 13"	August 4, 2011
424	14	"Episode 14"	August 7, 2011
425	15	"Episode 15"	August 10, 2011
426	16	"Episode 16"	August 11, 2011
427	17	"Episode 17"	August 14, 2011
428	18	"Episode 18"	August 17, 2011
429	19	"Episode 19"	August 18, 2011
430	20	"Episode 20"	August 21, 2011
431	21	"Episode 21"	August 24, 2011
432	22	"Episode 22"	August 25, 2011
433	23	"Episode 23"	August 28, 2011
434	24	"Episode 24"	August 31, 2011
435	25	"Episode 25"	September 1, 2011
436	26	"Episode 26"	September 4, 2011
437	27	"Episode 27"	September 7, 2011
438	28	"Episode 28"	September 8, 2011
439	29	"Episode 29"	September 14, 2011

=== Season 14 (2012) ===
No. overall	No. in season	Title	Original release date
440	1	"Episode 1"	July 12, 2012
441	2	"Episode 2"	July 15, 2012
442	3	"Episode 3"	July 18, 2012
443	4	"Episode 4"	July 19, 2012
444	5	"Episode 5"	July 22, 2012
445	6	"Episode 6"	July 25, 2012
446	7	"Episode 7"	July 26, 2012
447	8	"Episode 8"	July 29, 2012
448	9	"Episode 9"	August 1, 2012
449	10	"Episode 10"	August 2, 2012
450	11	"Episode 11"	August 5, 2012
451	12	"Episode 12"	August 8, 2012
452	13	"Episode 13"	August 9, 2012
453	14	"Episode 14"	August 12, 2012
454	15	"Episode 15"	August 15, 2012
455	16	"Episode 16"	August 16, 2012
456	17	"Episode 17"	August 19, 2012
457	18	"Episode 18"	August 22, 2012
458	19	"Episode 19"	August 23, 2012
459	20	"Episode 20"	August 26, 2012
460	21	"Episode 21"	August 29, 2012
461	22	"Episode 22"	August 30, 2012
462	23	"Episode 23"	September 2, 2012
463	24	"Episode 24"	September 5, 2012
464	25	"Episode 25"	September 6, 2012
465	26	"Episode 26"	September 9, 2012
466	27	"Episode 27"	September 12, 2012
467	28	"Episode 28"	September 13, 2012
468	29	"Episode 29"	September 16, 2012
469	30	"Episode 30"	September 19, 2012

=== Season 15 (2013) ===
No. overall	No. in season	Title	Original release date
470	1	"Episode 1"	June 26, 2013
471	2	"Episode 2"	June 30, 2013
472	3	"Episode 3"	July 2, 2013
473	4	"Episode 4"	July 3, 2013
474	5	"Episode 5"	July 7, 2013
475	6	"Episode 6"	July 10, 2013
476	7	"Episode 7"	July 11, 2013
477	8	"Episode 8"	July 14, 2013
478	9	"Episode 9"	July 17, 2013
479	10	"Episode 10"	July 18, 2013
480	11	"Episode 11"	July 21, 2013
481	12	"Episode 12"	July 24, 2013
482	13	"Episode 13"	July 25, 2013
483	14	"Episode 14"	July 28, 2013
484	15	"Episode 15"	July 31, 2013
485	16	"Episode 16"	August 1, 2013
486	17	"Episode 17"	August 4, 2013
487	18	"Episode 18"	August 7, 2013
488	19	"Episode 19"	August 8, 2013
489	20	"Episode 20"	August 11, 2013
490	21	"Episode 21"	August 14, 2013
491	22	"Episode 22"	August 15, 2013
492	23	"Episode 23"	August 18, 2013
493	24	"Episode 24"	August 21, 2013
494	25	"Episode 25"	August 22, 2013
495	26	"Episode 26"	August 25, 2013
496	27	"Episode 27"	August 28, 2013
497	28	"Episode 28"	August 29, 2013
498	29	"Episode 29"	September 1, 2013
499	30	"Episode 30"	September 4, 2013
500	31	"Episode 31"	September 5, 2013
501	32	"Episode 32"	September 8, 2013
502	33	"Episode 33"	September 11, 2013
503	34	"Episode 34"	September 12, 2013
504	35	"Episode 35"	September 15, 2013
505	36	"Episode 36"	September 18, 2013

=== Season 16 (2014) ===
No. overall	No. in season	Title	Original release date
506	1	"Episode 1"	June 25, 2014
507	2	"Episode 2"	June 26, 2014
508	3	"Episode 3"	June 29, 2014
509	4	"Episode 4"	July 2, 2014
510	5	"Episode 5"	July 3, 2014
511	6	"Episode 6"	July 6, 2014
512	7	"Episode 7"	July 9, 2014
513	8	"Episode 8"	July 10, 2014
514	9	"Episode 9"	July 13, 2014
515	10	"Episode 10"	July 16, 2014
516	11	"Episode 11"	July 17, 2014
517	12	"Episode 12"	July 20, 2014
518	13	"Episode 13"	July 23, 2014
519	14	"Episode 14"	July 24, 2014
520	15	"Episode 15"	July 27, 2014
521	16	"Episode 16"	July 30, 2014
522	17	"Episode 17"	July 31, 2014
523	18	"Episode 18"	August 3, 2014
524	19	"Episode 19"	August 6, 2014
525	20	"Episode 20"	August 7, 2014
526	21	"Episode 21"	August 10, 2014
527	22	"Episode 22"	August 13, 2014
528	23	"Episode 23"	August 14, 2014
529	24	"Episode 24"	August 17, 2014
530	25	"Episode 25"	August 20, 2014
531	26	"Episode 26"	August 21, 2014
532	27	"Episode 27"	August 24, 2014
533	28	"Episode 28"	August 27, 2014
534	29	"Episode 29"	August 28, 2014
535	30	"Episode 30"	August 31, 2014
536	31	"Episode 31"	September 3, 2014
537	32	"Episode 32"	September 4, 2014
538	33	"Episode 33"	September 7, 2014
539	34	"Episode 34"	September 9, 2014
540	35	"Episode 35"	September 10, 2014
541	36	"Episode 36"	September 14, 2014
542	37	"Episode 37"	September 16, 2014
543	38	"Episode 38"	September 17, 2014
544	39	"Episode 39"	September 19, 2014
545	40	"Episode 40"	September 24, 2014

=== Season 17 (2015) ===
No. overall	No. in season	Title	Day(s)	Original release date
Week 1
546	1	"Episode 1"	Day 1	June 24, 2015
547	2	"Episode 2"	Day 1	June 25, 2015
548	3	"Episode 3"	Days 1–7	June 28, 2015
549	4	"Episode 4"	Days 7–10	July 1, 2015
550	5	"Episode 5"	Days 10–15	July 2, 2015
Week 2
551	6	"Episode 6"	Days 13–16	July 5, 2015
552	7	"Episode 7"	Days 16–19	July 8, 2015
553	8	"Episode 8"	Days 19–22	July 9, 2015
Week 3
554	9	"Episode 9"	Days 21–23	July 12, 2015
555	10	"Episode 10"	Days 23–26	July 15, 2015
556	11	"Episode 11"	Days 26–29	July 16, 2015
Week 4
557	12	"Episode 12"	Days 29–30	July 19, 2015
558	13	"Episode 13"	Days 30–33	July 22, 2015
559	14	"Episode 14"	Days 33–36	July 23, 2015
Week 5
560	15	"Episode 15"	Days 35–37	July 26, 2015
561	16	"Episode 16"	Days 37–40	July 29, 2015
562	17	"Episode 17"	Days 40–43	July 30, 2015
Week 6
563	18	"Episode 18"	Days 43–44	August 2, 2015
564	19	"Episode 19"	Days 44–47	August 5, 2015
565	20	"Episode 20"	Days 47–50	August 6, 2015
Week 7
566	21	"Episode 21"	Days 50–51	August 9, 2015
567	22	"Episode 22"	Days 51–54	August 12, 2015
568	23	"Episode 23"	Days 54–57	August 13, 2015
Week 8
569	24	"Episode 24"	Days 57–58	August 16, 2015
570	25	"Episode 25"	Days 58–61	August 19, 2015
571	26	"Episode 26"	Days 61–64	August 20, 2015
Week 9
572	27	"Episode 27"	Days 64–65	August 23, 2015
573	28	"Episode 28"	Days 65–68	August 26, 2015
574	29	"Episode 29"	Days 68–71	August 27, 2015
Week 10
575	30	"Episode 30"	Days 71–72	August 30, 2015
576	31	"Episode 31"	Days 72–75	September 2, 2015
577	32	"Episode 32"	Days 75–78	September 3, 2015
Week 11
578	33	"Episode 33"	Days 78–79	September 6, 2015
579	34	"Episode 34"	Days 79–82	September 9, 2015
580	35	"Episode 35"	Days 82–85	September 10, 2015
Week 12
581	36	"Episode 36"	Days 85–86	September 13, 2015
582	37	"Episode 37"	Days 86–89	September 15, 2015
583	38	"Episode 38"	Days 89–91	September 16, 2015
Week 13
584	39	"Episode 39"	Days 91–94	September 20, 2015
585	40	"Episode 40"	Days 91–98	September 23, 2015

=== Season 18 (2016) ===
No. overall	No. in season	Title	Original release date
586	1	"Episode 1"	June 22, 2016
587	2	"Episode 2"	June 23, 2016
588	3	"Episode 3"	June 26, 2016
589	4	"Episode 4"	June 29, 2016
590	5	"Episode 5"	June 30, 2016
591	6	"Episode 6"	July 3, 2016
592	7	"Episode 7"	July 6, 2016
593	8	"Episode 8"	July 7, 2016
594	9	"Episode 9"	July 10, 2016
595	10	"Episode 10"	July 13, 2016
596	11	"Episode 11"	July 14, 2016
597	12	"Episode 12"	July 17, 2016
598	13	"Episode 13"	July 20, 2016
599	14	"Episode 14"	July 21, 2016
600	15	"Episode 15"	July 22, 2016
601	16	"Episode 16"	July 24, 2016
602	17	"Episode 17"	July 27, 2016
603	18	"Episode 18"	July 28, 2016
604	19	"Episode 19"	July 31, 2016
605	20	"Episode 20"	August 3, 2016
606	21	"Episode 21"	August 4, 2016
607	22	"Episode 22"	August 7, 2016
608	23	"Episode 23"	August 10, 2016
609	24	"Episode 24"	August 11, 2016
610	25	"Episode 25"	August 14, 2016
611	26	"Episode 26"	August 17, 2016
612	27	"Episode 27"	August 18, 2016
613	28	"Episode 28"	August 19, 2016
614	29	"Episode 29"	August 21, 2016
615	30	"Episode 30"	August 24, 2016
616	31	"Episode 31"	August 25, 2016
617	32	"Episode 32"	August 28, 2016
618	33	"Episode 33"	August 31, 2016
619	34	"Episode 34"	September 1, 2016
620	35	"Episode 35"	September 4, 2016
621	36	"Episode 36"	September 7, 2016
622	37	"Episode 37"	September 8, 2016
623	38	"Episode 38"	September 11, 2016
624	39	"Episode 39"	September 13, 2016
625	40	"Episode 40"	September 14, 2016
626	41	"Episode 41"	September 16, 2016
627	42	"Episode 42"	September 21, 2016

=== Over the Top (2016) ===
No.	Title	Day(s)	Original release date
1	"Big Brother: Over the Top - Episode 1"	Days 1–8	October 5, 2016
2	"Big Brother: Over the Top - Episode 2"	Days 8–15	October 12, 2016
3	"Big Brother: Over the Top - Episode 3"	Days 15–22	October 19, 2016
4	"Big Brother: Over the Top - Episode 4"	Days 22–29	October 26, 2016
5	"A Superfan Kisses BB:OTT Goodbye"	Days 29–36	November 2, 2016
6.1	"The Sisters Fight for their Lives on BB:OTT"	Days 36–43	November 9, 2016
6.2	"Double Eviction Shakes Up the BB:OTT House"	Days 36–43	November 10, 2016
7	"A New Alliance Emerges"	Days 43–50	November 16, 2016
8	"The Final Veto Rocks the House"	Days 50–57	November 23, 2016
9	"The Battle of the Final Four"	Days 57–63	November 29, 2016
10	"Big Brother Over the Top Crowns a Winner"	Days 64–65; Various (Note: In episode 10, the highlights of the final three HouseGuests, as well as other notable HouseGuests, were reviewed prior to crowning the winner.)	December 1, 2016

=== Season 19 (2017) ===
No. overall	No. in season	Title	Day(s)	Original release date	U.S. viewers (millions)	Rating/share (18–49)
Week 1
628	1	"Episode 1"	Day 1	June 28, 2017	5.88	1.7/7
629	2	"Episode 2"	Days 1–8	June 29, 2017	5.37	1.6/7
630	3	"Episode 3"	Days 8–9	July 2, 2017	5.16	1.4/7
631	4	"Episode 4"	Days 9–11	July 5, 2017	6.15	1.8/8
632	5	"Episode 5"	Days 11–16	July 6, 2017	6.09	1.9/8
Week 2
633	6	"Episode 6"	Days 16–17	July 9, 2017	6.39	1.8/8
634	7	"Episode 7"	Days 18–20	July 12, 2017	6.45	1.9/9
635	8	"Episode 8"	Day 20–23	July 13, 2017	6.11	1.8/8
Week 3
636	9	"Episode 9"	Days 23–24	July 16, 2017	5.95	1.8/8
637	10	"Episode 10"	Days 25–27	July 19, 2017	6.19	1.9/8
638	11	"Episode 11"	Days 28–30	July 20, 2017	5.96	1.9/7
639	12	"Episode 12"	Day 30	July 21, 2017	5.45	1.5/7
Week 4
640	13	"Episode 13"	Days 30–31	July 23, 2017	5.98	1.8/7
641	14	"Episode 14"	Days 32–34	July 26, 2017	6.35	1.8/8
642	15	"Episode 15"	Days 34–37	July 27, 2017	6.33	1.9/8
Week 5
643	16	"Episode 16"	Days 37–38	July 30, 2017	6.33	1.9/8
644	17	"Episode 17"	Days 39–41	August 2, 2017	6.57	1.9/8
645	18	"Episode 18"	Days 41–44	August 3, 2017	6.42	1.9/8
Week 6
646	19	"Episode 19"	Days 44–45	August 6, 2017	6.46	2.0/8
647	20	"Episode 20"	Days 46–48	August 9, 2017	6.39	1.9/8
648	21	"Episode 21"	Day 48–51	August 10, 2017	5.95	1.9/8
Week 7
649	22	"Episode 22"	Days 51–52	August 13, 2017	6.22	1.9/8
650	23	"Episode 23"	Days 53–55	August 16, 2017	6.27	1.9/8
651	24	"Episode 24"	Days 55–58	August 17, 2017	6.48	2.1/8
652	25	"Episode 25"	Day 58; Various (Note: In Episodes 25 and 38, the HouseGuests looked back over their time in the Big Brother house. Flashbacks included clips from previous Days in the house, while the current Days in the house were 58 and 86–91, respectively)	August 18, 2017	5.06	1.4/7
Week 8
653	26	"Episode 26"	Days 58–59	August 20, 2017	6.42	1.8/7
654	27	"Episode 27"	Day 59–62	August 23, 2017	6.10	1.8/7
655	28	"Episode 28"	Days 62–65	August 24, 2017	6.03	1.7/7
Week 9
656	29	"Episode 29"	Days 65–66	August 27, 2017	6.28	1.8/7
657	30	"Episode 30"	Days 67–69	August 30, 2017	6.20	1.8/7
658	31	"Episode 31"	Days 69–72	August 31, 2017	4.91	1.5/6
Week 10
659	32	"Episode 32"	Days 72–73	September 3, 2017	5.65	1.7/7
660	33	"Episode 33"	Days 74–76	September 6, 2017	6.33	1.9/7
661	34	"Episode 34"	Days 76–79	September 7, 2017	6.24	1.8/7
Week 11
662	35	"Episode 35"	Days 79–80	September 10, 2017	6.27	1.9/7
663	36	"Episode 36"	Days 80–84	September 13, 2017	6.38	1.8/7
664	37	"Episode 37"	Days 84–86	September 14, 2017	6.12	1.8/7
Week 12
665	38	"Episode 38"	Days 86–91; Various	September 15, 2017	4.89	1.2/6
666	39	"Episode 39"	Day 91–92	September 20, 2017	6.70	2.2/8

=== Season 20 (2018) ===
No. overall	No. in season	Title	Day(s)	Original release date	U.S. viewers (millions)	Rating/share (18–49)
Week 1
667	1	"Episode 1"	Day 1	June 27, 2018	5.33	1.5/7
668	2	"Episode 2"	Days 2–5	June 28, 2018	5.13	1.4/6
669	3	"Episode 3"	Days 5–9	July 1, 2018	4.78	1.2/6
670	4	"Episode 4"	Days 9–12	July 4, 2018	3.95	0.9/5
671	5	"Episode 5"	Days 12–16	July 5, 2018	4.96	1.3/6
Week 2
672	6	"Episode 6"	Days 16–17	July 8, 2018	5.11	1.3/6
673	7	"Episode 7"	Days 17–20	July 11, 2018	5.43	1.5/7
674	8	"Episode 8"	Days 20–23	July 12, 2018	5.32	1.5/6
Week 3
675	9	"Episode 9"	Days 23–24	July 15, 2018	5.19	1.4/6
676	10	"Episode 10"	Days 24–27	July 18, 2018	5.24	1.4/6
677	11	"Episode 11"	Days 27–30	July 19, 2018	5.58	1.6/7
Week 4
678	12	"Episode 12"	Days 27, 30–31	July 22, 2018	5.45	1.5/6
679	13	"Episode 13"	Days 31–34	July 25, 2018	5.69	1.5/6
680	14	"Episode 14"	Days 34–37	July 26, 2018	5.44	1.5/6
Week 5
681	15	"Episode 15"	Days 37–38	July 29, 2018	5.40	1.5/6
682	16	"Episode 16"	Days 38–41	August 1, 2018	5.55	1.5/6
683	17	"Episode 17"	Days 41–44	August 2, 2018	5.61	1.5/6
Week 6
684	18	"Episode 18"	Days 44–45	August 5, 2018	5.57	1.6/7
685	19	"Episode 19"	Days 45–48	August 8, 2018	5.63	1.6/8
686	20	"Episode 20"	Days 48–51	August 9, 2018	4.99	1.4/7
Week 7
687	21	"Episode 21"	Days 51–52	August 12, 2018	5.74	1.6/8
688	22	"Episode 22"	Days 52–55	August 15, 2018	5.82	1.7/8
689	23	"Episode 23"	Days 55–58	August 16, 2018	5.71	1.7/8
Week 8
690	24	"Episode 24"	Days 58–59	August 19, 2018	5.80	1.6/7
691	25	"Episode 25"	Days 59–61	August 22, 2018	5.70	1.6/8
692	26	"Episode 26"	Days 61–65	August 23, 2018	5.61	1.6/8
Week 9
693	27	"Episode 27"	Days 65–66	August 26, 2018	5.67	1.6/7
694	28	"Episode 28"	Days 66–69	August 29, 2018	5.77	1.6/8
695	29	"Episode 29"	Days 69–72	August 30, 2018	4.54	1.3/5
Week 10
696	30	"Episode 30"	Days 72–73	September 2, 2018	4.66	1.3/7
697	31	"Episode 31"	Days 73–76	September 5, 2018	5.52	1.6/8
698	32	"Episode 32"	Days 76–79	September 6, 2018	5.21	1.5/6
Week 11
699	33	"Episode 33"	Days 79–80	September 9, 2018	5.48	1.6/6
700	34	"Episode 34"	Days 80–83	September 12, 2018	5.70	1.5/7
701	35	"Episode 35"	Days 83–86	September 13, 2018	5.57	1.6/7
Week 12
702	36	"Episode 36"	Days 86–87	September 16, 2018	6.36	1.7/6
703	37	"Episode 37"	Days 87–91	September 19, 2018	5.56	1.5/7
704	38	"Episode 38"	Days 91–93	September 20, 2018	5.68	1.5/7
Week 13
705	39	"Episode 39"	Days 93–94; Various (Note: A recap of Angela's eviction that took place on September 20, 2018 (Day 93 inside the House) is shown with JC, Kaycee, and Tyler's reactions. The episode then transitions to the next day, where the HouseGuests looked back over their time in the game with flashbacks from previous events that took place. The episode ends with the start of the first part of the final Head of Household competition that took place in real time on September 20, 2018.)	September 23, 2018	5.44	1.4/6
706	40	"Episode 40"	Days 93–99	September 26, 2018	5.65	1.7/7

=== Season 21 (2019) ===
No. overall	No. in season	Title	Day(s)	Original release date	U.S. viewers (millions)	Rating/share (18–49)
Week 1
707	1	"Episode 1"	Day 1	June 25, 2019	4.93	1.3/7
708	2	"Episode 2"	Days 1–2	June 26, 2019	4.52	1.1/6
709	3	"Episode 3"	Days 2–8	June 30, 2019	4.32	1.0/6
710	4	"Episode 4"	Days 8–12	July 2, 2019	4.46	1.1/6
711	5	"Episode 5"	Days 12–15	July 3, 2019	4.25	1.1/7
Week 2
712	6	"Episode 6"	Days 15–17	July 7, 2019	4.32	1.0/5
713	7	"Episode 7"	Days 17–20	July 10, 2019	4.15	1.1/6
714	8	"Episode 8"	Days 20–23	July 11, 2019	4.05	1.0/6
Week 3
715	9	"Episode 9"	Days 23–24	July 14, 2019	4.20	1.0/6
716	10	"Episode 10"	Days 24–27	July 17, 2019	4.00	1.0/6
717	11	"Episode 11"	Days 27–30	July 18, 2019	3.79	1.0/5
Week 4
718	12	"Episode 12"	Days 30–31	July 21, 2019	4.27	1.1/6
719	13	"Episode 13"	Days 31–34	July 24, 2019	3.88	1.0/6
720	14	"Episode 14"	Days 34–37	July 25, 2019	3.87	1.0/6
Week 5
721	15	"Episode 15"	Days 37–38	July 28, 2019	4.30	1.0/6
722	16	"Episode 16"	Days 38–41	July 31, 2019	3.82	1.1/6
723	17	"Episode 17"	Days 41–44	August 1, 2019	3.80	1.0/5
Week 6
724	18	"Episode 18"	Days 44–45	August 4, 2019	4.13	1.1/6
725	19	"Episode 19"	Days 45–48	August 7, 2019	3.97	1.1/6
726	20	"Episode 20"	Days 48–51	August 8, 2019	3.87	1.0/6
Week 7
727	21	"Episode 21"	Days 51–52	August 11, 2019	4.58	1.2/7
728	22	"Episode 22"	Days 52–55	August 14, 2019	4.22	1.1/6
729	23	"Episode 23"	Days 55–58	August 15, 2019	4.18	1.0/6
Week 8
730	24	"Episode 24"	Days 58–59	August 18, 2019	4.72	1.3/6
731	25	"Episode 25"	Days 59–62	August 21, 2019	4.52	1.3/7
732	26	"Episode 26"	Days 62–65	August 22, 2019	4.36	1.2/6
Week 9
733	27	"Episode 27"	Days 65–66	August 25, 2019	4.64	1.2/6
734	28	"Episode 28"	Days 66–69	August 28, 2019	4.27	1.1/6
735	29	"Episode 29"	Days 69–72	August 29, 2019	3.45	0.9/5
Week 10
736	30	"Episode 30"	Days 72–73	September 1, 2019	4.01	0.9/5
737	31	"Episode 31"	Days 73–76	September 4, 2019	4.45	1.2/7
738	32	"Episode 32"	Days 76–79	September 5, 2019	4.16	1.1/5
Week 11
739	33	"Episode 33"	Days 79–80	September 8, 2019	4.75	1.2/5
740	34	"Episode 34"	Days 80–83	September 11, 2019	4.57	1.1/6
741	35	"Episode 35"	Days 83–86	September 12, 2019	4.56	1.2/6
Week 12
742	36	"Episode 36"	Days 86–87	September 15, 2019	4.59	1.2/5
743	37	"Episode 37"	Days 87–90	September 18, 2019	4.33	1.1/5
744	38	"Episode 38"	Days 90–93	September 19, 2019	4.38	1.1/6
Week 13
745	39	"Episode 39"	Day 93; Various (Note: The episode featured flashbacks to various events in the house that explained how the Final 3 got to where they were.)	September 22, 2019	4.96	1.3/6
746	40	"Episode 40"	Days 93–99	September 25, 2019	4.20	1.2/6
