= Xavier Prather =

American reality television personality and lawyer (born 1994)

- Born: Xavier Eugene Prather; May 12, 1994 (age 32); Kalamazoo, Michigan, U.S.
- Other name: X
- Education: Spring Arbor University (BA); Marquette University Law School (JD)
- Occupations: Lawyer; reality television personality; model
- Known for: Big Brother (winner); The Challenge: USA
- Website: xaviereprather.com

Xavier Eugene Prather (born May 12, 1994) is an American lawyer and reality television personality. He is the winner of the 23rd season of the American reality television series Big Brother, becoming the first African American to win a regular season in the show's 21-year history. In 2022, he appeared as a contestant on The Challenge: USA where he was eliminated in episode 4.

Outside reality television, Prather is a lawyer, model, and a former college basketball player.

== Personal life and career ==
Prather was born on May 12, 1994, in Kalamazoo, Michigan. He graduated from Gull Lake High School, where he stood out as a member of the school's varsity boys basketball team. He then attended Spring Arbor University, earning his Bachelor of Arts in criminal justice. While there, he played for the Spring Arbor University men's basketball team. He then matriculated to Valparaiso University School of Law, before transferring to Marquette University Law School and subsequently earning his Juris Doctor.

After graduation, he worked as an attorney for a law firm until setting up his own law practice, LawyerLike, in the spring of 2024. Nearly two years after starting his law practice, it was absorbed by a larger law firm, Foster Swift Collins & Smith, PC, where he continues to practice in the areas of family law, entertainment law, and sports law.

== Reality television ==
=== Big Brother 23 ===
CBS announced Prather as a HouseGuest for Big Brother 23 on July 1, 2021. During his time in the house, he became a member of the six-person alliance named "The Cookout". The alliance, consisting of only African Americans, was created to ensure the crowning of the first black winner of a regular season of Big Brother. During the September 9 double-eviction episode, the last non-Cookout HouseGuest was evicted, leaving the final six composed solely of members of The Cookout.

On September 29, 2021, Prather won the final Head of Household competition of the season, evicting HouseGuest Azah Awasum and earning a spot in the final two. He was crowned the winner of the season by a unanimous vote, defeating Derek Frazier and earning the $750,000 prize. He is the third player in the history of the show to win by a unanimous vote in a regular season, following Dan Gheesling and Cody Calafiore.

=== Big Brother: Reindeer Games ===
In 2023, CBS announced that Prather would be returning to Big Brother to compete in the holiday spin-off season, Big Brother Reindeer Games. He made it to the finale and tied for 3rd place alongside Frankie Grande.

=== The Challenge: USA ===
On June 8, 2022, CBS announced Prather as a contestant on The Challenge: USA. He competed alongside former Big Brother, The Amazing Race, and Survivor contestants. During the July 27 episode, Prather and his partner Shan Smith were thrown into elimination against Justine Nbdia and fellow Big Brother alum David Alexander. Prather and Smith lost and were eliminated from the competition.

== Filmography ==
Television appearances
Year	Title	Role	Notes
2021	Big Brother 23	Contestant	Winner; 37 episodes
2021	The Bold and the Beautiful	James	2 episodes
2022	The Challenge: USA	Contestant	4 episodes, 11th place
2022	Big Brother 24	Himself	Guest appearance; Episode 33 (aired September 22)
2023	Big Brother 25	Himself	Guest appearance; 25th Anniversary Celebration Episode (aired July 26)
2023	Big Brother Reindeer Games	Contestant	3rd place; 6 episodes
2024	The Anonymous	Contestant	10th place; 7 episodes
2026	The Floor	Contestant	

Preceded by Cody Calafiore	Winner of Big Brother; Season 23	Succeeded by Taylor Hale
