= Bowie Jane =

Australian DJ, producer, singer, and lawyer

- Born: Miranda Ball; Australia
- Television: Big Brother 25

Miranda "Bowie Jane" Ball is an Australian DJ, producer, singer, and practicing lawyer, best known for her appearance on Big Brother 25 in the United States.

== Career ==
=== Law ===
From 2009–2013, Jane, worked as a criminal lawyer in Melbourne, under her name Miranda Ball. It was revealed in 2013, that she worked in law during the day, whilst performing music during nights, whilst the lawyers did not know she sung and vice versa. Once her story was well–known, she quit law in March 2013 to become a full–time musician.

=== Music ===
In 2013, Jane released her debut single "Luv Bomb", which was on the UK singles chart. In 2018, she released another single, "Busted", premiering on the CBS series S.W.A.T., which rose up on the Dance Club Songs Billboard chart to number 21.

=== Big Brother ===
In 2023, Bowie Jane competed in season 25 of CBS' Big Brother, where she achieved third place. She was known in the house for causing annoyance to fellow houseguests Cirie Fields and Felicia Cannon who both referred to her as "fucking Bowie Jane," and her jury question asking eventual winner Jag Bains about the Mafia alliance with runner-up Matt Klotz and herself.

Bowie Jane won three head of household competitions, which was more than any other female contestant in the season.

== Personal life ==
Bowie Jane studied law and commerce at Deakin University. At the same time, she played covers in restaurants in an acoustic group. She moved to London in March 2013, to pursue a pop music career. She settled in Los Angeles in 2015.
