= Big Brother 25 (American season) =

Big Brother
- Season 25
- Promotional poster for Big Brother 25
- Hosted by: Julie Chen Moonves
- No. of days: 100
- No. of houseguests: 17
- Winner: Jag Bains
- Runner-up: Matt Klotz
- America's Favorite HouseGuest: Cameron Hardin
- No. of episodes: 42

Release
- Original network: CBS
- Original release: August 2 – November 9, 2023

Season chronology
- ← Previous; Season 24 Next → Season 26

Big Brother 25 is the 25th season of the American reality television program Big Brother. The season featured a comic multiverse theme. It premiered on August 2, 2023, on CBS in the United States and on Global in Canada, following a 25th Anniversary special aired on July 26. Hosted by Julie Chen Moonves, the show follows a group of contestants (known as HouseGuests), who live in a house together while being constantly filmed and having no communication with the outside world as they compete to win a grand prize of $750,000.

The season came to an end on November 9, 2023. After a record-breaking 100 days in the house, Jagateshwar "Jag" Bains was crowned the winner in a 5–2 vote over Matt Klotz. Jag is the first and only winner in history to be voted off and then saved by another player through an in-game competition. He was coincidentally saved by Matt. Additionally, Cameron Hardin was named America's Favourite HouseGuest, winning $50,000.

== Format ==
Big Brother follows a group of contestants, known as HouseGuests, who live inside a custom-built house outfitted with cameras and microphones recording their every move 24 hours a day. The HouseGuests are sequestered with no contact with the outside world. During their stay, the HouseGuests share their thoughts on their day-to-day lives inside the house in a private room known as the Diary Room. Each week, the HouseGuests compete in competitions in order to win power and safety inside the house. At the start of each week, the HouseGuests compete in a Head of Household (abbreviated as "HOH") competition. The winner of the HoH competition is immune from eviction and selects two HouseGuests to be nominated for eviction. Six HouseGuests are then selected to compete in the Power of Veto (abbreviated as "PoV") competition: the reigning HoH, the nominees, and three other HouseGuests chosen by random draw. The winner of the PoV competition has the right to either revoke the nomination of one of the nominated HouseGuests or leave them as is. If the veto winner uses this power, the HoH must immediately nominate another HouseGuest for eviction. The PoV winner is also immune from being named as the replacement nominee. On eviction night, all HouseGuests vote to evict one of the nominees, though the Head of Household and the nominees are not allowed to vote. This vote is conducted in the privacy of the Diary Room. In the event of a tie, the Head of Household casts the tie-breaking vote. The nominee with the most votes is evicted from the house. The last seven evicted HouseGuests comprise the Jury and are sequestered in a separate location following their eviction and ultimately decide the winner of the season. The Jury is only allowed to see the competitions and ceremonies that include all of the remaining HouseGuests; they are not shown any interviews or other footage that might include strategy or details regarding nominations. The viewing public is able to award an additional prize by choosing "America's Favorite HouseGuest." All evicted HouseGuests are eligible to win this award except for those who either voluntarily leave or are forcibly removed for rule violations.

=== Format changes and additions ===
==== BB Break-in and BB Multiverse ====
On July 28, 2023, CBS released a clip featuring former HouseGuests Frankie Grande from Big brother season 16, Britney Haynes from Big brother seasons 12 and season 14, and Danielle Reyes from Big brother seasons 3 and Big brother all stars (season 7), who were seen "breaking into" the Big Brother House with a "time laser." According to a press release issued in conjunction with the clip, the trio of former contestants, who all lost their respective seasons, broke into the house in an attempt to "go back in time and change the outcome of their season," which backfired, unleashing the first twist of the season, which would be revealed on the premiere episode.

==== BB Multiverse ====
The BB Break-in revealed that Grande, Haynes, and Reyes had opened up the BB Multiverse, combining four universes: the Comic-verse, the Humili-verse, the Scary-verse, and the Scramble-verse. There are four rooms in the house, each themed to one of the universes. Additionally, these universes are the basis for the competitions and game twists for the season. The notable game twists and events from each universe are as follows.

===== Comic-verse =====
- BB Power of Invincibility: Fans had the opportunity to cast their votes for an extraordinary superpower. The top four vote-receiving HouseGuests would compete in a secret competition for the BB Power of Invincibility. This power would grant the winning HouseGuest the ability to nullify one of the next two evictions, in Week 4 or Week 5, including their own. If the power were used on a HouseGuest not evicted in Week 4, that power would remain active the following week. If the power was successfully used on a HouseGuest, the week would reset, and the outgoing Head of Household could compete in the following Head of Household competition.
- Comic Week: Week 11 was announced as Comic Week, which would superpower the Head of Household and the Power of Veto.
  - BB Power of Invisibility: This superpower allowed the Head of Household to remain anonymous to the other HouseGuests and operate in secret for the duration of the week. The Head of Household would also be eligible to compete in the following week's HOH competition, where they would normally be ineligible.
  - BB Power of Multiplicity: This superpower allowed for two Powers of Veto to be up for grabs. It additionally allowed the number of Veto competitors to be raised from 6 to 8, including all current HouseGuests.

===== Humili-verse =====
- Humili-week: Week 6 was deemed "Humili-week." Immediately following the Head of Household competition, the HouseGuests were informed that everyone, except for the HOH, would be a Have-Not this week, taking turns sleeping in the Have-Not room. This week also had various other punishments for the HouseGuests.

===== Scary-verse =====
- Nether Region: On premiere night, the loser of the Scary-verse nomination competition would also be dragged into the "Nether Region" for an undetermined amount of time. Upon this person's return, they informed the rest of the HouseGuests about a message from the Scary-verse: while they had returned relatively quickly, the next person may not be so lucky. In Week 2, the Head of Household competition runner-up was sent to the Nether Region. Upon their return, they had to select one HouseGuest to be sent to the Nether Region; however, this HouseGuest would receive immunity for the week. Upon this person's return, they had to select one more HouseGuest to be sent to the Nether Region. This player would be ineligible to play in the Power of Veto competition.
- Scary Week Double Eviction & Resurrection Week: Week 7 was announced as Scary Week, which unknown to the HouseGuests, resulted in a surprise Fake Double Eviction. Following the Double Eviction, both evictees became "BB Zombies" and returned to the house for the following week, where they had the chance to officially return to the game. During "Resurrection Week", no Head of Household or Veto competitions were held. Instead, both "BB Zombies" competed for an advantage that gave them the option to either compete themselves or force the other "Zombie" to compete in the "Re-Entry" Competition at the end of the week. One would remain and have their game "resurrected", while the other would be officially evicted.
- Trick or Treat Luxury Competition: During the Halloween special episode of Big Brother 25, the Final 5 competed in Trick or Treat, where they were told to either give candy to other houseguests' buckets ("treats") or take candy away from them ("tricks"). The houseguest with the most pieces of candy at the end of five rounds would be awarded $5,000.

===== Scramble-verse =====
- Nomination Competition & Head of Household Save: On premiere night, the HouseGuests entered in groups of four and each had to pick a spot in a different competition with four options. Instead of competing for the power of Head of Household, they were competing to avoid nomination. The losers of each of the four competitions would be nominated for eviction Week 1. The Head of Household in Week 1 had to choose which two of the four nominated HouseGuests to remove from the block.
- 17th HouseGuest: On the official CBS social media pages, it was announced a 17th HouseGuest would be entering the Big Brother House to play. After the Nomination Competition, the HouseGuests were greeted by Cirie Fields, a then-four-time Survivor player, as the 17th HouseGuest.

==== Smaller jury ====
At the beginning of the Day 44 Head of Household competition, Julie announced that, to commemorate the 25th season, the jury would be going "old school", consisting of only seven HouseGuests (as was the case between seasons 4 through 14), instead of the usual nine (as had been the case between seasons 15 through 24 and as it had been the case with season 26).

== HouseGuests ==
The cast of the twenty-fifth season of Big Brother Top: Jag, Red, Bowie Jane, Reilly, Matt, Jared, Luke, and Hisam Middle: Cirie, Izzy, Mecole, America, Cameron, Kirsten, Blue, and Felicia Bottom: Cory

The HouseGuests for the twenty-fifth season were revealed on July 31, 2023. Among the initial cast were Deaflympics gold medalist Matt Klotz, and two relatives of Survivor alumni: Jared Fields, the son of (at the time) four-time Survivor contestant Cirie Fields; and Cory Wurtenberger, the younger brother of Zach Wurtenberger from Survivor 42. Shortly before the premiere, the show announced on social media that there would be a 17th HouseGuest, who was revealed at the end of the premiere episode to be Cirie Fields herself, becoming the first former Survivor contestant to compete in the show. The inclusion of the Fields mother & son pairing is also the first new familial pre-existing relationship to be included on the show since Big Brother: Over the Top.

Name	Age	Occupation	Residence	Entry	Result
Jag Bains	25	Truck company owner	Omak, Washington	Day 30	Winner; Day 100
Jag Bains	25	Truck company owner	Omak, Washington	Day 1	Eviction nullified Day 30
Matt Klotz	27	Deaflympics gold medalist	Baton Rouge, Louisiana	Day 1	Runner-up; Day 100
Bowie Jane Ball	46	Lawyer, Barrister & DJ	Los Angeles, California	Day 1	Evicted; Day 100
Felicia Cannon	63	Real estate agent	Kennesaw, Georgia	Day 1	Evicted; Day 96
Cirie Fields	53	Surgical director	Jersey City, New Jersey	Day 1	Evicted; Day 93
America Lopez	27	Medical receptionist	Edinburg, Texas	Day 1	Evicted; Day 86
Blue Kim	25	Brand strategist	New York, New York	Day 1	Evicted; Day 86
Cory Wurtenberger	21	College student	Weston, Florida	Day 1	Evicted; Day 79
Cameron Hardin	34	Stay-at-home father	Eastman, Georgia	Day 58 (Note: Cameron won entry back into the game on Day 58.)	Evicted; Day 72
Cameron Hardin	34	Stay-at-home father	Eastman, Georgia	Day 1	Evicted; Day 51
Mecole Hayes	30	Political consultant	Upper Marlboro, Maryland	Day 1	Evicted; Day 65
Jared Fields	25	Exterminator	Norwalk, Connecticut	Day 1	Evicted; Day 51 (Note: Although Jared was evicted on Day 51, he did not officially leave the Big Brother house until Day 58 due to the "zombie" twist.)
Isabel "Izzy" Gleicher	32	Professional flutist	Upper West Side, New York	Day 1	Evicted; Day 44
Michael "Red" Utley	37	Sales	Gatlinburg, Tennessee	Day 1	Evicted; Day 37
Hisam Goueli	45	Geriatric physician	Seattle, Washington	Day 1	Evicted; Day 23
Reilly Smedley	24	Bartender	Nashville, Tennessee	Day 1	Evicted; Day 16
Kirsten Elwin	25	Molecular biologist	Houston, Texas	Day 1	Evicted; Day 9
Luke Valentine	30	Illustrator	Coral Springs, Florida	Day 1	Expelled; Day 8

=== Future appearances ===
Later in 2023, Cameron Hardin competed on the holiday spin-off, Big Brother: Reindeer Games, where he was eliminated in the first episode.

In 2024, Luke Valentine competed on Season 3 of Fishtank Live.

In 2025, Felicia Cannon made a cameo appearance in the Week 2 Veto Competition in Big Brother 27; Jag Bains also had a segment on an "Unlocked" episode which also occurred in that season. America Lopez and Blue Kim competed on The Challenge: Vets & New Threats. Later in 2025, Cirie Fields competed on the world tribe of Survivor: Australia V The World. Later in 2025, Jag Bains and Izzy Gleicher competed on The Amazing Race 38, Bains partnered with his brother and Gleicher partnered with her significant other. The Bains brothers won the season.

In 2026, Fields competed on Survivor 50: In the Hands of the Fans. Reilly Smedley competed on The Challenge: Cutthroat.

In 2027, Bains competed on the sixth season of The Traitors.

== Episodes ==
No. overall	No. in season	Title	Day(s)	Timeslot (ET)	Original release date	U.S. viewers (millions)	Rating (18–49)
Week 1
856	1	"Episode 1"	Day 1	Wednesday 8:00 p.m.	August 2, 2023	3.41	0.7
Sixteen new HouseGuests enter the house and each are assigned a color-coded spot in four different competitions, themed to the "Big Brother Multiverse" (the "Comicverse", "Humiliverse", "Scaryverse", and "Scrambleverse"). Julie then reveals that each person who comes in last place during each competition would be immediately nominated for eviction. Jared, Kirsten, Felicia, and Cory all lose their respective competitions and are nominated, with Cory being taken away from the rest of the HouseGuests. After entering the house, the HouseGuests are met by Cirie Fields, who is revealed as an additional HouseGuest competing for the prize.
857	2	"Episode 2"	Days 1–3	Sunday 8:00 p.m.	August 6, 2023	3.35	0.7
After Cirie officially enters the game, Izzy privately tells Jared she is aware that he is her son, but she vows to keep the information private. After forming multiple alliances amongst the HouseGuests, Kirsten is targeted by Jared, Cirie, and Felicia. Following a competition which require the HouseGuests to walk across a balance beam, Reilly is named the Head of Household and is tasked with saving two of the four HouseGuests from eviction. Convinced by the other HouseGuests, Reilly removes Jared and Cory from the block, leaving Felicia and Kirsten as the nominees.
858	3	"Episode 3"	Days 3–6	Wednesday 8:00 p.m.	August 9, 2023	3.26	0.6
Kirsten is consoled after the nomination ceremony, with Reilly revealing that Felicia is only a pawn and Kirsten is the main target. The first Power of Veto competition plays out with Hisam, Blue, and Cameron chosen as additional players. Hisam wins the Power of Veto. At the veto meeting, Hisam decides not to use the Veto, leaving Kirsten and Felicia on the nomination block.
859	4	"Episode 4"	Days 6–9	Thursday 9:01 p.m.	August 10, 2023	2.85	0.6
The house divides into three core groups: the Professors (Cirie, Felicia, Red, Hisam, Bowie, Mecole, and Izzy); the Bye-Bye Bitches (Cirie, Izzy, Bowie, Felicia, and Mecole); and the Handful (Cameron, Jag, Matt, Blue, and Reilly). After violating the Big Brother code of conduct via ethnic slur, Luke is removed from the game. At the eviction ceremony, Kirsten is the first HouseGuest to be evicted by a unanimous 13–0 vote.
Week 2
860	5	"Episode 5"	Days 9–10	Sunday 8:00 p.m.	August 13, 2023	2.89	0.6
The remaining HouseGuests, excluding Reilly, partake in the second HOH competition, which ultimately comes down to Jared and Hisam, with Hisam taking the victory. The Professors celebrate a week of safety while Hisam argues that his target is Reilly for going after him during the previous week. For being the runner-up in the HOH competition, Jared is exiled from the house and later returns with the ability to send someone else away. After discussions with the other HouseGuests, he ultimately chooses to send Jag, granting him safety. At the nomination ceremony, Hisam nominates Reilly and Cameron for eviction.
861	6	"Episode 6"	Days 10–13	Wednesday 8:00 p.m.	August 16, 2023	3.23	0.6
Hisam comforts Reilly after nominating her, while Jag is tasked with sending another player away to the nether-region; he ultimately chooses to send Bowie Jane. Matt, America and Blue are picked to play in the PoV competition, in which Hisam wins. Bowie Jane returns, while Hisam tells Reilly that his nominations will remain the same. Following through with his word, Hisam decides not to use the Power of Veto, leaving Reilly and Cameron on the nomination block.
862	7	"Episode 7"	Days 13–16	Thursday 9:01 p.m.	August 17, 2023	3.07	0.6
After Hisam demanded that the house vote out Reilly unanimously, Cirie attempts to flip the vote onto Cameron in hopes of blindsiding him. Ultimately, the flip does not pan out and Reilly is the second HouseGuest evicted in a unanimous 12–0 vote.
Week 3
863	8	"Episode 8"	Days 16–17	Sunday 8:00 p.m.	August 20, 2023	3.24	0.6
After Reilly is evicted, the houseguests compete to become the next HOH, in which Felicia wins. She quickly makes a plan to backdoor her previous alliance member, Hisam, with support from Cirie, Jared and Izzy. Hoping to secure her plan, she nominates both Cameron and Jag as pawns.
864	9	"Episode 9"	Days 17–20	Wednesday 8:00 p.m.	August 23, 2023	3.29	0.6
After Felicia nominates Cameron and Jag she tells them that neither of them are her targets. Felicia, Jag, Cameron, Izzy, Cory and Red compete for the Power Of Veto with Jag coming out victorious. At the veto meeting, Jag uses the veto on himself and Felicia nominates Hisam as her replacement, blindsiding him.
865	10	"Episode 10"	Days 20–23	Thursday 9:01 p.m.	August 24, 2023	3.02	0.6
Hisam attempts to convince the house to flip on Cameron, apologizing to Cirie and Felicia for the way he treated them the week prior. Despite his efforts, he is ultimately evicted by a unanimous vote of 11–0. Shortly after, the HouseGuests begin competing for HOH, themed to the Pressure Cooker.
Week 4
866	11	"Episode 11"	Days 23–24	Sunday 8:00 p.m.	August 27, 2023	3.18	0.6
As the HouseGuests compete for power, Felicia watches from the living room as the competition comes down to Mecole, America and Cameron. Mecole drops, with America falling shortly behind, asking for herself and Cory to be safe for the week. Cameron comes out victorious and works with a fake alliance known as the Legend 25 (consisting of himself, Cirie, Felicia, Matt, Bowie Jane, Red, Mecole and Izzy), being convinced to go after Jag. At the nomination ceremony, Cameron nominates Jag and Blue for eviction.
867	12	"Episode 12"	Days 24–27	Wednesday 8:00 p.m.	August 30, 2023	3.33	0.6
Hoping to secure power for his final two with Red (known as The Chillers), Cameron orchestrates a plan to keep the nominations the same. At the veto, Cameron, Blue, Jag, Red, Mecole and Jared compete for the power, with Red coming out victorious. At the veto meeting, Red decides not to use the power of veto.
868	13	"Episode 13"	Days 27–30	Thursday 9:01 p.m.	August 31, 2023	3.14	0.6
Before the eviction, the HouseGuests are notified that the viewers have been voting for four HouseGuests to compete for a power which can cancel one of the next two evictions. Matt, Cory, Jag and Cirie compete for the power, with Matt reigning victorious. He tells Cirie and Jag about his victory, and after Jag is evicted in a unanimous 10–0 vote, saves him from eviction, resetting the game with Cameron eligible for HOH.
Week 5
869	14	"Episode 14"	Days 30–31	Sunday 8:00 p.m.	September 3, 2023	2.99	0.6
With every HouseGuest competing for power, an elimination competition results in Jared becoming the new HOH. He enlists the help of Cirie, Izzy and Felicia, and refuses to nominate his showmance Blue. After realizing that they are a duo, Jared nominates Red and Cameron for eviction.
870	15	"Episode 15"	Days 31–34	Wednesday 8:00 p.m.	September 6, 2023	3.28	0.7
With the Power of Veto on the line, Jared, Red, Cameron, America, Felicia and Matt compete. Cameron comes out victorious and removes himself from the nomination block. With a plan in motion to keep his closest allies safe, Jared nominates Jag as his replacement nominee.
871	16	"Episode 16"	Days 34–37	Thursday 9:01 p.m.	September 7, 2023	2.90	0.6
Hoping to not be evicted after returning, Jag rivals against Red during the eviction. After celebrating his birthday, Red is evicted in a 8–2 vote, with Cameron and Bowie Jane voting to evict Jag. Shortly after, the HouseGuests compete in a live Head of Household competition. To everyone's chagrin, Cameron is the new winner.
Week 6
872	17	"Episode 17"	Days 37–38	Sunday 8:30 p.m.	September 10, 2023	3.74	0.8
Due to being blindsided, Cameron keeps his cards close to his chest and blindsides the whole house after telling them that Jag and Blue would hit the nomination block. At the nomination ceremony, Cameron nominates Felicia and Izzy for eviction.
873	18	"Episode 18"	Days 38–41	Wednesday 8:00 p.m.	September 13, 2023	3.51	0.8
Upset at being in danger, Cirie enlists damage control and convinces Cameron that they would still like to work with him. Cameron, Izzy, Felicia, Jag, Matt and Jared compete for the Power of Veto hosted by Josh Duhamel, with Felicia, Izzy and Matt receiving punishments. Jared wins the power and contemplated using it on Felicia; however, when Cameron states that his replacement nominee would be Cirie, Jared decides to leave the nominations the same.
874	19	"Episode 19"	Days 41–44	Thursday 8:00 p.m.	September 14, 2023	3.21	0.6
Realizing that they are on the outs, Cory and America initiate a plan to vote out Izzy, leaving out Cirie and Jared. At the eviction, their flip is successful and Izzy is evicted by an 8–1 vote, with Cirie voting to evict Felicia. After the eviction, Julie informs the HouseGuests that the jury phase will start later than usual, and they begin competing for HOH.
Week 7
875	20	"Episode 20"	Days 44–45	Sunday 10:29 p.m.	September 17, 2023	2.78	0.5
Jared wins "The Wall" HOH competition and elects to nominate Cory and America for eviction.
876	21	"Episode 21"	Days 45–48	Wednesday 8:00 p.m.	September 20, 2023	3.48	0.7
Jag wins the "Sweaty Scrimmage" veto competition and decides to use the veto on Cory. Jared names Cameron as the replacement nominee during the Veto Ceremony.
877	22	"Episode 22"	Days 48–51	Thursday 8:00 p.m.	September 21, 2023	3.48	0.7
Julie informs the houseguests that tonight will be a Double Eviction episode. Cameron is evicted by a vote of 8–0 in the first live eviction. At the live "Soulmates" HOH competition, Cory emerges victorious and elects to nominate Jared and Blue for eviction. At the "Monster Kill" veto competition, Matt wins and decides to keep nominations the same. Jared is evicted by a 6–1 vote in the second live eviction of the evening. Julie Chen informs both Jared and Cameron that they will both have a chance to win their way back into the competition.
Week 8
878	23	"Episode 23"	Days 51–52	Sunday 9:59 p.m.	September 24, 2023	2.61	0.5
Jared and Cameron return to the BB House as "BB Zombies" and inform their fellow houseguests that 1 will have their game resurrected and the other will officially exit for good after a series of competitions.
879	24	"Episode 24"	Days 52–58	Thursday 9:00 p.m.	September 28, 2023	2.78	0.5
Cameron wins the first two parts of the competition and decides that he will take on the third competition. Cameron completes the third competition under the time limit and officially returns to the competition; Jared is officially eliminated from the competition. Julie Chen informs Cory that he is eligible to compete in the upcoming HOH competition due to the Zombie Twist nullifying Jared's eviction while he was HOH.
Week 9
880	25	"Episode 25"	Days 58–59	Sunday 9:59 p.m.	October 1, 2023	2.48	0.4
Houseguests compete in "We Come In Pieces" HOH competition which Cameron wins. Cameron elects to nominate Felicia and Mecole for eviction.
881	26	"Episode 26"	Days 59–62	Tuesday 8:00 p.m.	October 3, 2023	3.08	0.4
America, Blue, Cameron, Felicia, Matt, and Mecole take part in the "BB Exorcism" veto competition which Cameron wins. Cameron then forms a plan to backdoor Cory, Jag believes it's too early for that move to take place. At the beginning of the veto ceremony, Felicia calls out Cory for being dishonest with her. The episode concludes on a cliffhanger on whether or not Cameron will use the veto.
882	27	"Episode 27"	Days 62–65	Thursday 9:00 p.m.	October 5, 2023	2.91	0.6
At the conclusion of the veto ceremony, Cameron elects not to backdoor Cory and keeps the nominations same. After the ceremony, Felicia and America get into an argument regarding a Final 4 deal. At the live eviction, Mecole is evicted by a vote of 7–0. Houseguests then complete in the live "Humiligram" HOH competition which Bowie Jane wins. At the end of the episode, Julie Chen informs the houseguests that they have officially reached the Jury phase of the competition.
Week 10
883	28	"Episode 28"	Days 65–66	Sunday 9:59 p.m.	October 8, 2023	2.75	0.4
Bowie decides to nominate Felicia and Cirie for eviction due to still being betrayed by the Red vote back on Day 37.
884	29	"Episode 29"	Days 66–68	Tuesday 8:00 p.m.	October 10, 2023	3.15	0.6
America, Bowie, Cirie, Felicia, Jag, and Matt compete in the OTEV the Zinging Robot competition in which Jag emerges victorious. Jag then convinces Bowie Jane that Cameron should be backdoored, Bowie agrees and intends to name Cameron as a replacement nominee.
885	30	"Episode 30"	Days 68–72	Thursday 9:00 p.m.	October 12, 2023	2.75	0.5
At the veto ceremony, Jag uses the veto to save Felicia. Bowie Jane goes through with the plan to backdoor Cameron and selects him as the replacement nominee. By a vote of 6–0 Cameron is evicted for a second time and becomes the first member of the jury.
Week 11
886	31	"Episode 31"	Days 72–73	Sunday 9:59 p.m.	October 15, 2023	2.37	0.4
Houseguests are informed that this week is "Comics Week" and are informed that the winner of the HOH competition will remain anonymous. Houseguests then compete in "BB Comics" HOH competition and are informed that the winning time was 8 minutes and 30 seconds. Jag informs Matt that he is the Invisible HOH. At the nomination ceremony, Jag anonymously nominates Blue and Felicia for eviction.
887	32	"Episode 32"	Days 73–76	Tuesday 8:00 p.m.	October 17, 2023	3.13	0.5
Houseguests are informed of the "Power of Multiplicity" twist where 2 vetos will be up for grabs. Jag wins the first veto, while Blue wins the second veto. Jag informs Matt and other houseguests that he wants to double blindside Cory and America; by planning to them both up as nominees for eviction.
888	33	"Episode 33"	Days 76–79	Thursday 9:20 p.m.	October 19, 2023	2.65	0.5
At the veto ceremony, Blue uses the veto on herself and America is announced as the first replacement nominee. Jag also uses his veto to remove Felicia from the block, Cory is announced as the second replacement nominee. Cory is unanimously evicted by a vote of 5–0 and becomes the second member of the Jury. Afterwards, Julie announces to the audience that next week will be a Double Eviction week.
Week 12
889	34	"Episode 34"	Days 79–80	Sunday 9:59 p.m.	October 22, 2023	2.54	0.4
Houseguests compete in the "Demented Dentist" HOH competition, which Jag wins. At the nomination ceremony, Jag nominates America and Blue for eviction with Blue being his target by being a better competitor.
890	35	"Episode 35"	Days 80–83	Tuesday 8:00 p.m.	October 24, 2023	3.10	0.5
Jag, Blue, America, Matt, Bowie, and Felicia compete in the "Embrassaing Expedition" veto competition which Jag wins. At the veto ceremony, Jag elects to keep the nominations intact.
891	36	"Episode 36"	Days 83–86	Thursday 9:00 p.m.	October 26, 2023	2.95	0.5
Julie informs the houseguests that tonight will be a double eviction and Blue is evicted by a vote of 4–0 in the first eviction of the evening. In the live HOH Competition, Bowie Jane wins and elects to nominate Felicia and America for eviction. At the veto competition, Matt emerges victorious and decides to keep nominations the same. America is then evicted by a vote of 3–0 at the second live eviction of the night.
Week 13
892	37	"Episode 37"	Days 86–87	Sunday 9:59 p.m.	October 29, 2023	2.89	0.5
At the "Superhero Smackdown" HOH competition Matt emerges victorious. After promising Cirie that he wouldn't nominate her if he won, he goes back against his word and nominates Cirie along with Felicia for eviction.
893	38	"Episode 38"	Days 87–90	Tuesday 8:00 p.m.	October 31, 2023	3.13	0.5
Jag wins the Veto competition. Houseguests also competed in a luxury competition where Matt wins $5,000. Jag convinces Matt that they should target Cirie due to her social prowess. At the Veto Ceremony, Jag decides to not use the veto and nominations remain the same.
894	39	"Episode 39"	Days 90–93	Thursday 9:01 p.m.	November 2, 2023	2.82	0.5
Cameron, Cory, Blue, and America reunite in the jury house and share their thoughts on the remaining players. Cirie is evicted by a vote 2–0 and becomes the fifth jury member. Houseguests then compete in the live HOH competition where Bowie Jane wins and guarantees herself a spot on finale night.
Week 14
895	40	"Episode 40"	Days 93–96	Sunday 9:59 p.m.	November 5, 2023	2.49	0.4
Bowie Jane nominates Felicia and Matt for eviction. Cirie joins the jury and she reflects on her eviction. At the veto competition, houseguests had to organize pictures of moments that transpired throughout the competition which Jag wins. At the live veto and eviction ceremony, Jag decides to evict Felicia who becomes the sixth member of the jury.
896	41	"Episode 41"	Day 96; Various (Note: In Episode 41, the final three HouseGuests looked back over their time in the Big Brother house. Flashbacks included clips from previous days in the house, while the current day in the house was 96.)	Tuesday 8:00 p.m.	November 7, 2023	2.83	0.5
Bowie Jane, Jag and Matt receive videos from home and reminisce on their favorite memories throughout the competition. The final 3 houseguests begin Part 1 of the Final HOH competition.
897	42	"Episode 42"	Days 96–100	Thursday 8:00 p.m.	November 9, 2023	3.43	0.7
Matt wins Part 1, while Jag wins Part 2 of the Final HOH competition. Big Brother legend Will Kirby hosts the jury roundtable where the jury compliments Matt's social game, recognize Jag's control during the jury phase, and criticize Bowie for not having many original thoughts. Jag and Matt compete in Part 3 where they listen to a video regarding each jury member and have to select which statement is false. After both get all but 1 question correct, a tiebreaker question is asked and Jag was the closest and becomes the Final HOH. At the final eviction ceremony, Jag elects to evict Bowie Jane. Jag and Matt then face the jury, Matt highlights saving Jag as his biggest move while Jag says that he made all the strategic moves in the duo. In the end, the jury votes 5–2 to crown the Jag the winner of BB25. Felicia and Cirie cast their votes for Matt. Julie Chen reveals that Matt, Cameron, and Cirie placed in the top 3 for America's Favorite Houseguest, and announces that Cameron won AFP as well as the $50,000 that comes with winning the award.

== Voting history ==
Color key:

Winner
Runner-up
Head of Household
Nominated for eviction
Immune from eviction
Not eligible to vote
Expelled by production
Evicted
Eviction nullified
Re-entered the game

Voting history (season 25)
	Week 1 (Note: On Day 1, the original sixteen HouseGuests competed in four separate competitions to earn safety. The losers of each competition were all nominated for eviction. After Reilly won HoH, she earned the power to remove two of the four nominated HouseGuests; she removed Cory and Jared.)	Week 2	Week 3	Week 4	Week 5	Week 6	Week 7		Week 8	Week 9	Week 10	Week 11	Week 12		Week 13	Week 14		
	Week 1	Week 2	Week 3	Week 4	Week 5	Week 6	Day 45	Day 51 (Note: This week was a double eviction week. Following the first eviction, the remaining HouseGuests played a week's worth of games – including Head of Household and veto competitions; and nomination, veto, and eviction ceremonies – during the live show, culminating in a second eviction for the week.)	Week 8	Week 9	Week 10	Week 11	Day 80	Day 86	Week 13	Day 94	Day 100	Finale
Head of Household	Reilly	Hisam	Felicia	Cameron	Jared	Cameron	Jared	Cory	(None)	Cameron	Bowie Jane	Jag (Note: This week granted anonymity to this week's Head of Household. To protect their status, this player was eligible to compete in the Head of Household competition the following week.)	Jag	Bowie Jane	Matt	Bowie Jane	Jag	(None)
Nominations (initial)	~~Cory~~; Felicia; ~~Jared~~; Kirsten	Cameron; Reilly	Cameron; Jag	Blue; Jag	Cameron; Red	Felicia; Izzy	America; Cory	Blue; Jared	Cameron; Jared (Note: After the double eviction, Cameron and Jared became "zombies" and competed the following week to re-enter the game.)	Felicia; Mecole	Cirie; Felicia	Blue; Felicia	America; Blue	America; Felicia	Cirie; Felicia	Felicia; Matt	(None)	(None)
Veto winner(s)	Hisam	Hisam	Jag	Red	Cameron	Jared	Jag	Matt	(None)	Cameron	Jag	Blue; Jag (Note: Two Powers of Veto were won this week. Blue used hers on herself, while Jag used his on Felicia.)	Jag	Matt	Jag	Jag	(None)	(None)
Nominations (final)	Felicia; Kirsten	Cameron; Reilly	Cameron; Hisam	Blue; Jag	Jag; Red	Felicia; Izzy	America; Cameron	Blue; Jared	(None)	Felicia; Mecole	Cameron; Cirie	America; Cory	America; Blue	America; Felicia	Cirie; Felicia	Felicia; Matt	Bowie Jane; Matt	(None)
Jag	Kirsten	Reilly (Note: Jared chose to send Jag to the Nether Region, granting him immunity for the week.)	Hisam	Nominated	Nominated	Izzy	Cameron	Jared	No vote	Mecole	Cameron	Head of Household	Head of Household	America	Cirie	Felicia	Bowie Jane (Note: As Head of Household, Jag chose to evict Bowie Jane.)	Winner
Matt	Kirsten	Reilly	Hisam	Jag	Red	Izzy	Cameron	Jared	No vote	Mecole	Cameron	Cory	Blue	America	Head of Household	Nominated	Nominated	Runner-up
Bowie Jane	Kirsten	Reilly	Hisam	Jag	Jag	Izzy	Cameron	Jared	No vote	Mecole	Head of Household	Cory	Blue	Head of Household	Cirie	Head of Household	Evicted (Day 100)	Jag
Felicia	Nominated	Reilly	Head of Household	Jag	Red	Nominated	Cameron	Jared	No vote	Nominated	Cameron	Cory	Blue	Nominated	Nominated	Nominated	Evicted (Day 96)	Matt
Cirie	Kirsten	Reilly	Hisam	Jag	Red	Felicia	Cameron	Blue	No vote	Mecole	Nominated	Cory	Blue	America	Nominated	Evicted (Day 93)		Matt
America	Kirsten	Reilly	Hisam	Jag	Red	Izzy	Nominated	Jared	No vote	Mecole	Cameron	Nominated	Nominated	Nominated	Evicted (Day 86)			Jag
Blue	Kirsten	Reilly	Hisam	Nominated	Red	Izzy	Cameron	Nominated	No vote	Mecole	Cameron	Cory	Nominated	Evicted (Day 86)				Jag
Cory	Kirsten	Reilly	Hisam	Jag	Red	Izzy	Cameron	Head of Household	No vote	Mecole	Cameron	Nominated	Evicted (Day 79)					Jag
Cameron	Kirsten	Nominated	Nominated	Head of Household	Jag	Head of Household	Nominated	Zombie (Day 51)		Head of Household	Nominated	Re-evicted (Day 72)						Jag
Mecole	Kirsten	Reilly	Hisam	Jag	Red	Izzy	Cameron	Jared	No vote	Nominated	Evicted (Day 65)							
Jared	Kirsten	Reilly	Hisam	Jag	Head of Household	Izzy	Head of Household	Nominated	Zombie (Day 51)	Evicted (Day 58)								
Izzy	Kirsten	Reilly	Hisam	Jag	Red	Nominated	Evicted (Day 44)											
Red	Kirsten	Reilly	Hisam	Jag	Nominated	Evicted (Day 37)												
Hisam	Kirsten	Head of Household	Nominated	Evicted (Day 23)														
Reilly	Head of Household	Nominated	Evicted (Day 16)															
Kirsten	Nominated	Evicted (Day 9)																
Luke	Expelled (Day 8)																	
Evicted	Kirsten; 13 of 13 votes to evict	Reilly; 12 of 12 votes to evict	Hisam; 11 of 11 votes to evict	Jag; 10 of 10 votes to evict (Note: Matt used the Power of Invincibility to nullify Jag's eviction.)	Red; 8 of 10 votes to evict	Izzy; 8 of 9 votes to evict	Cameron; 8 of 8 votes to evict	Jared; 6 of 7 votes to evict	Cameron; Won re-entry into game	Mecole; 7 of 7 votes to evict	Cameron; 6 of 6 votes to evict	Cory; 5 of 5 votes to evict	Blue; 4 of 4 votes to evict	America; 3 of 3 votes to evict	Cirie; 2 of 2 votes to evict	Felicia; Jag's choice to evict	Bowie Jane; Jag's choice to evict	Jag; 5 votes to win
Evicted	Kirsten; 13 of 13 votes to evict	Reilly; 12 of 12 votes to evict	Hisam; 11 of 11 votes to evict	Jag; 10 of 10 votes to evict	Red; 8 of 10 votes to evict	Izzy; 8 of 9 votes to evict	Cameron; 8 of 8 votes to evict	Jared; 6 of 7 votes to evict	Cameron; Won re-entry into game	Mecole; 7 of 7 votes to evict	Cameron; 6 of 6 votes to evict	Cory; 5 of 5 votes to evict	Blue; 4 of 4 votes to evict	America; 3 of 3 votes to evict	Cirie; 2 of 2 votes to evict	Felicia; Jag's choice to evict	Bowie Jane; Jag's choice to evict	Matt; 2 votes to win

== Production ==
=== Development ===
Big Brother 25 was co-produced by production companies Endemol Shine North America and Fly On The Wall Entertainment. The renewal of the series was announced on September 25, 2022, upon the conclusion of the previous season. Host Julie Chen Moonves returned for the season along with Allison Grodner and Rich Meehan, who serve as executive producers. The game ran for a total of 100 days.

Entertainment Weekly released the key art for the season on July 24.

=== Casting ===
Casting began around March 2023, with the first open-call auditions conducted since the onset of the COVID-19 pandemic in 2020. One of these casting calls was conducted from March 1 through 11, 2023, at West Hollywood. Furthermore, it was also revealed the cast would consist entirely of new players.

=== Production design ===
The house is located at the Radford Studio Center in Los Angeles, California. This season is outfitted with 90 HD cameras and more than 113 microphones. A sneak peek of the house design for the season was shown at the end of the 25th Anniversary Special on July 26. Chen Moonves later hinted at the house's theme for the season via an Instagram post on July 27.

In the exclusive house tour for Entertainment Tonight released on August 1, the house design was revealed to revolve around the theme of "Big Brother Multiverse." The house design draws inspiration from science fiction franchises, comic books, and artistic surrealism.

The living area of the house is decorated in a space theme with brown and blue accents, and features a pneumatic tube used by the producers to relay messages to the HouseGuests. One bedroom is designed to be "upside down," while another is designed to emulate the look and feel of a 1950s pulp comic. A horror-themed bedroom was designed to look like a basement, featuring hands protruding from the walls.

== Release ==
=== Broadcast ===
On May 22, 2023, CBS announced the season will premiere on August 2, 2023, citing the 2023 Writers Guild of America strike as the reason behind the delay. It expected to conclude on November 9, 2023. The series is set to air three episodes a week, initially following its regular schedule on Sunday, Wednesday, and Thursday. When the 2023–24 television season begins the Wednesday episode will shift to Tuesday. A 25th anniversary celebration special aired prior to the premiere featuring several former HouseGuests, on July 26.

=== Streaming ===
Following a controversial decision to eliminate live feeds on the show's Canadian counterpart, Big Brother Canada, a press release on the renewal of the show confirmed that the live feeds for the show would continue to be available on CBS' streaming platform Paramount+ along with full episodes. Additionally, the live feeds can also be streamed on the streaming platform Pluto TV.

== Critical response ==
=== Luke Valentine's usage of an ethnic slur ===
In the early morning hours of August 9, Luke Valentine used an ethnic slur while conversing with other HouseGuests Cory Wurtenberger, Hisam Goueli, and Jared Fields, stating that they were in the cheese room followed by a derogatory term for African Americans. Usage of the word was first noticed by viewers of Big Brother's live feeds. In the clip, which was circulated on social media platforms, Valentine can be heard repeating the sentence without the slur and stating that he intended to say "narwhal" instead. He also apologized to Fields who laughed in response. Viewers of the series immediately began calling for his removal from the game. The live feeds were taken down shortly after and remained down until after the following day's episode. Later that day Valentine was instructed to report to the diary room where he was held for seven hours while waiting to speak to a member of human resources. He was then informed that a decision had been made to eject him from the game due to violating the series' code of conduct. At the time CBS issued a statement reiterating their "zero-tolerance policy" and stating that his departure would be addressed in the August 10 episode of the series. A censored version of the conversation was aired in the episode shortly after which the remaining HouseGuests were shown being informed of the situation by production. Wurtenberger stated in a diary room segment that use of the word "was directed toward me in a very casual, using it between friends kind of way, and I think the reaction was, ‘Yo, you gotta go to bed man.’" A week later Valentine hosted an Instagram Live video on August 16, where he disputed the producers' decision. In the video he explains that he only used the word because he was malnourished, sleep deprived, and under significant psychological distress. Valentine also argued that the punishment was extreme and that "a slap on the wrist would have been much better."

=== Accessibility issues for Matt Klotz ===
During the second week of the series, six contestants, including Matt Klotz, competed in the audio-based "Twisted Tasks" in an attempt to win the power of veto. After the August 16 episode of the series aired, viewers began questioning whether the competition was fair and accessible to Klotz who is deaf. In "Twisted Tasks," the competitors were required to wear headphones and decode a group of auditory hints. Ahead of the episode's release, Entertainment Weekly published an article in which Grodner reassured viewers that many accommodations had been made for Klotz, including pre-season tests on speaker placement, sealing diary room doors, creating directional audio, text-to-speech video screens, and meetings with his audiologist. Additionally, it was reported that ahead of the veto competition, production tested out different voices and frequencies to learn which version Klotz heard best. Chief engineer David Crivelli also revealed that they were required to find noise cancelling headphones that worked with Klotz's hearing aids and used directional array speakers during other competitions. Further issues were raised after the following week's Head of Household competition, "Revenge of the Pressure Cooker." During the competition the lights in the room were periodically switched off and on, the first time they were switched off Klotz stated "Now I can't hear or see," causing concern that Klotz was unable to read lips and would miss out on conversations.

=== Jared Fields's usage of an ableist slur ===
During an angry exchange with Cory Wurtenberger regarding America Lopez, Jared Fields called her an ableist slur. He later apologized to Wurtenberger and said he does not think Lopez is the "r-word." Though the initial conversation was not captured on the live feeds, Fields' apology was. Numerous viewers of the live feeds began calling for Jared to be ejected for using the slur. CBS did not show or comment about the incident afterwards. Fields later apologized for the incident in his post-eviction press interviews.

=== Allegations of bias and inequity ===
There was criticism from fans and commentators regarding the large volume of physical competitions that were geared favorably toward athletically strong men, which lead to men winning 30 out of 36 competitions this season. Only one woman was able to win the Power of Veto, whereas Jag Bains broke the record for the most Veto wins in a single season with seven. Spectators were also critical of the invariability of the competitions, which lead to the same people repeatedly winning them. David Wysong of The Cincinnati Enquirer compared the show to a "watered-down, kiddie version of The Challenge", and Cher Thompson of Screen Rant pointed out that the other contestants were placed at a disadvantage with the competitions not being properly balanced for everyone.

Fans also expressed disapproval that Bains was allowed to win back-to-back Head of Household competitions. While it has been a staple rule in the series that no incumbent Head of Household can win it again the following cycle (barring the final one), Bains was seemingly eligible under the pretense that his previous rule as Head of Household in Week 11 had been "invisible" and won anonymously. Bains proceeded to win it again in Week 12, making him the first person in Big Brother history to be the Head of Household for two consecutive weeks outside of the finale. Viewers accused the show of blatant favoritism towards Bains, pointing out a precedent set in season 23 wherein Claire Rehfuss, who anonymously acquired the power of Head of Household, was ineligible to win it again the following week.
