= The Amazing Race 38 =

Season of television series

- Season 38
- Promotional poster
- Presented by: Phil Keoghan
- No. of teams: 13
- Winners: Jas and Jag Bains
- No. of legs: 12
- Distance traveled: 7,500 mi (12,100 km)
- No. of episodes: 12

Release
- Original network: CBS
- Original release: September 25 – December 10, 2025

Additional information
- Filming dates: March 17 – April 9, 2025

Series chronology
- ← Previous; Season 37 Next → Season 39

The Amazing Race 38 (also known as The Amazing Race: European Adventure) is the thirty-eighth season of the American reality competition show The Amazing Race. Hosted by Phil Keoghan, it featured thirteen teams of two, each with a pre-existing relationship, competing in a race around Europe to win US$1,000,000. Each team also includes at least one former Big Brother houseguest. Filming took place from March 17 to April 9, 2025. This season visited two continents and nine countries, traveling approximately 7,500 miles (12,100 km) during twelve legs. Starting in Hoorn, racers traveled through the Netherlands, the Czech Republic, Hungary, Croatia, Romania, Greece, Italy, and France, before returning to the United States and finishing in New York City, New York. New elements introduced this season include a U-Turn penalty vote for a non-eliminated team. Elements of the show that returned for this season include the pre-starting line task, the international starting line, gifting a second Express Pass to another team, and the Hazard. The season premiered on CBS on September 25, 2025, and concluded on December 10, 2025.

Brothers and entrepreneurs Jas and Jag Bains were the winners of this season, becoming the first Sikh-Punjabi team to win the series. Dating couple Kyland Young and Taylor Hale finished in second place, and brothers Joseph and Adam Abdin finished in third place.

== Format ==
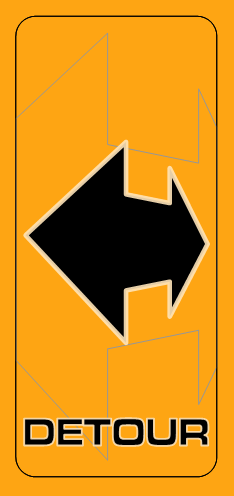
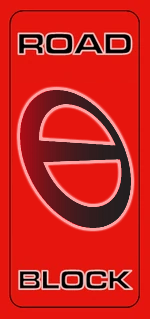
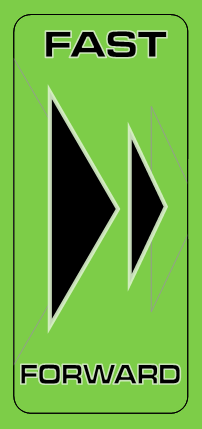
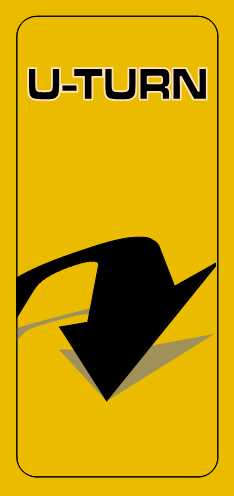
The clues which contestants receive during the course of the race generally fall into five categories: Route Info, Detour, Roadblock, Fast Forward, and U-Turn.

The Amazing Race is a reality television show created by Bertram van Munster and Elise Doganieri, and hosted by Phil Keoghan. The series follows teams of two competing in a race around the world. Each leg of the race requires teams to deduce clues, navigate foreign environments, interact with locals, perform physical and mental challenges, and travel on a limited budget provided by the show. At each stop during the leg, teams receive clues inside sealed envelopes, which fall into one of these categories:

- Route Info: These are simple instructions that teams must follow before they can receive their next clue.
- Detour: A Detour is a choice between two tasks. Teams may choose either task and switch tasks if they find one option too difficult. There is usually one Detour present on each leg.
- Roadblock: A Roadblock is a task that only one team member can complete. Teams must choose which member will complete the task based on a brief clue they receive before fully learning the details of the task. There is usually one Roadblock present on each leg.
- Fast Forward: A Fast Forward is a task that only one team may complete, which allows that team to skip all remaining tasks on the leg and go directly to the next Pit Stop. Teams may only claim one Fast Forward during the entire race.
- U-Turn: The U-Turn allows teams to force another team to complete both options of the Detour before they can continue the race.
- Hazard: A penalty for the team who finished in last place on the season's first task. It required the team to complete an additional task in the first leg that only they had to complete.
- Scramble: A Scramble allows teams to complete a set of three tasks in any order that they choose. At the end of each task, teams receive one of three clue puzzle pieces that reveal their next destination after they are combined.
- Driver's Seat: A Driver's Seat allows one team to determine the work requirements for every team during a designated task.

Most teams who arrive last at the Pit Stop of each leg are progressively eliminated, while the first team to arrive at the finish line in the final episode wins the grand prize of US$1,000,000.

== Contestants ==
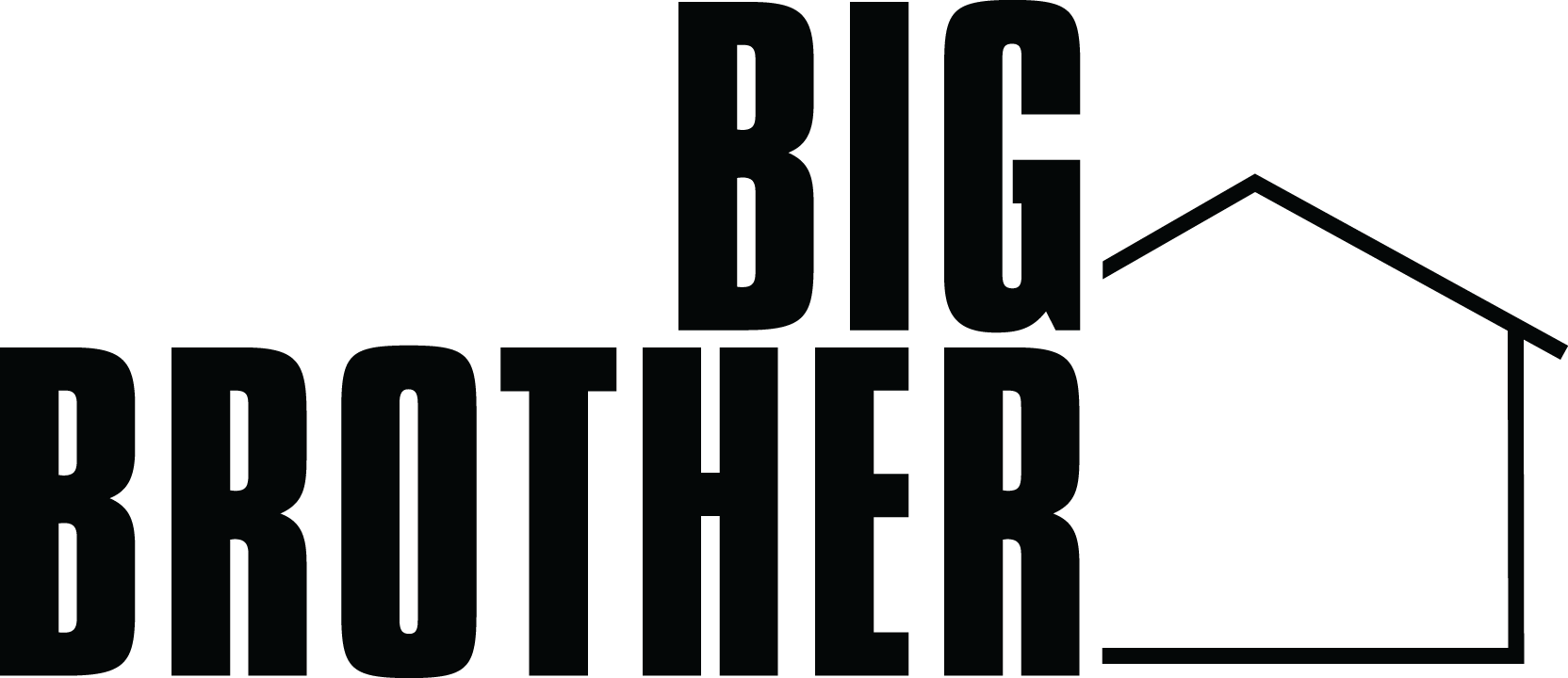
All contestant pairs have a Big Brother past player.

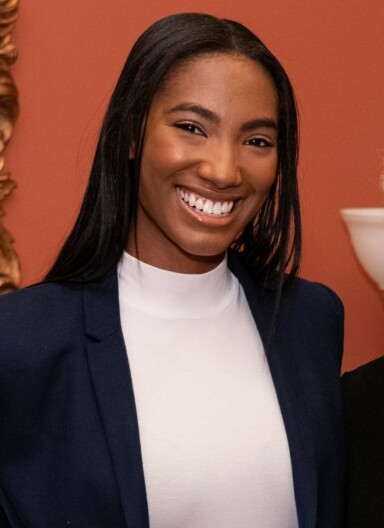
Taylor Hale

The cast consists of former Big Brother Houseguests and their relatives and friends. The cast was officially announced on August 14, 2025.

Contestants	Age	Relationship	Hometown	Status
Jack Palumbo	40	Jersey Brothers	Marlton, New Jersey	Eliminated 1st (in Amsterdam, Netherlands)
Enzo Palumbo Big Brother 12 & Big Brother 22	47	Jersey Brothers	Bayonne, New Jersey	Eliminated 1st (in Amsterdam, Netherlands)
Angela Murray Big Brother 26	51	Mother & Daughter	Syracuse, Utah	Eliminated 2nd (in Prague, Czech Republic)
Lexi Murray	23	Mother & Daughter	Las Vegas, Nevada	Eliminated 2nd (in Prague, Czech Republic)
Megan Belmonte	24	Newlyweds	Providence, Rhode Island	Eliminated 3rd (in Nové Dvory, Czech Republic)
Matt Turner Big Brother 24	25	Newlyweds	Providence, Rhode Island	Eliminated 3rd (in Nové Dvory, Czech Republic)
Kat Dunn Big Brother 21	35	Dating	Dallas, Texas	Eliminated 4th (in Budapest, Hungary)
Alex Romo	32	Dating	Dallas, Texas	Eliminated 4th (in Budapest, Hungary)
Hannah Chaddha Big Brother 23	25	Sisters	Washington, D.C.	Eliminated 5th (in Dubrovnik, Croatia)
Simone Chaddha	22	Sisters	Los Angeles, California	Eliminated 5th (in Dubrovnik, Croatia)
Kristine Bernabe	38	Sisters	Los Angeles, California	Eliminated 6th (in Prapratno, Croatia)
Rubina Bernabe Big Brother 26	36	Sisters	Los Angeles, California	Eliminated 6th (in Prapratno, Croatia)
Natalie Negrotti Big Brother 18	34	Sisters	New York City, New York	Eliminated 7th (in Bucharest, Romania)
Stephanie Negrotti	36	Sisters	Kauaʻi, Hawaii	Eliminated 7th (in Bucharest, Romania)
Tucker Des Lauriers Big Brother 26	31	Brothers	Brooklyn, New York	Eliminated 8th (in Athens, Greece)
Eric Des Lauriers	32	Brothers	Boston, Massachusetts	Eliminated 8th (in Athens, Greece)
Jack Baham	58	Father & Daughter	Rancho Cucamonga, California	Eliminated 9th (in Corbetta, Italy)
Chelsie Baham Big Brother 26	28	Father & Daughter	Rancho Cucamonga, California	Eliminated 9th (in Corbetta, Italy)
Izzy Gleicher Big Brother 25	34	Engaged	New York City, New York	Eliminated 10th (in Paris, France)
Paige Seber	32	Engaged	New York City, New York	Eliminated 10th (in Paris, France)
Joseph Abdin Big Brother 24	28	Brothers	Palm Beach, Florida	Third place
Adam Abdin	24	Brothers	Miami, Florida	Third place
Kyland Young Big Brother 23	34	Dating	Los Angeles, California	Runners-up
Taylor Hale Big Brother 24 & Big Brother Reindeer Games	30	Dating	Los Angeles, California	Runners-up
Jas Bains	28	Brothers & Entrepreneurs	Omak, Washington	Winners
Jag Bains Big Brother 25	27	Brothers & Entrepreneurs	Omak, Washington	Winners

Future appearances

In 2026, Angela Murray competed on Big Brother 28. In 2027, Jag Bains and Taylor Hale competed on the sixth season of The Traitors.

== Contestant progress ==
The following teams are listed with their placements in each leg. Placements are listed in finishing order.

- A red placement with a dagger (†) indicates that the team was eliminated.
- An underlined blue placement with a double-dagger (‡) indicates that the team was the last to arrive at a Pit Stop in a non-elimination leg and has an automatic U-turn vote penalty during the next leg.
- A green ƒ indicates that the team won the Fast Forward.
- A brown ⊃ indicates that the team used the U-Turn and a brown ⊂ indicates the team on the receiving end of the U-Turn.
- A purple ε indicates that the team used an Express Pass on that leg to bypass one of their tasks.

Team placement (by leg)
Team	1	2	3	4	5	6	7	8	9	10	11	12
Jas & Jag	1st	1st	2nd	5th	3rd⊃ (Note: Jas & Jag chose to use the U-Turn on Izzy & Paige.)	2nd	2nd	1stε (Note: Jag & Jas used their Express Pass to bypass the Roadblock on this leg.)	1st⊂ (Note: In leg 9, the teams each voted for two teams to be U-Turned; the two teams with the most votes received the U-Turn. Tucker & Eric received the most votes at four. Both Kyland & Taylor and Jas & Jag were tied with three votes each, thus needing a revote between those two teams where each team received one vote. As the vote was deadlocked following the revote, three teams were U-Turned instead of two.)	1st	1st	1st
Kyland & Taylor	9th	9th	9th	4th	2nd	3rd	4th	3rdε (Note: Kyland & Taylor used their Express Pass to bypass the Detour on this leg.)	5th⊂	4th	2nd	2nd
Joseph & Adam	8th	2nd	4th	7th	4th⊃ (Note: Joseph & Adam chose to use the U-Turn on Kristine & Rubina.)	5th	3rd	6th‡	3rd	3rd	3rd	3rd
Izzy & Paige	3rd	6th	6th	3rd	7th⊂	7th	6th	4th	4th	2nd	4th†	
Jack & Chelsie	6th	7th	8th	9th	6th	6th	5th	5th	2nd	5th†		
Tucker & Eric	2nd	4th	3rd	1stƒ	1st	1st	1st	2nd	6th†⊂			
Natalie & Stephanie	5th	3rd	1st	2nd	5th	4th	7th†					
Kristine & Rubina	4th	8th	7th	8th	8th⊂	8th†						
Hannah & Simone	7th	5th	5th	6th	9th†							
Kat & Alex	11th	10th	10th	10th†								
Megan & Matt	12th	11th	11th†									
Angela & Lexi	10th	12th†										
Jack & Enzo	13th†											

== Race summary ==
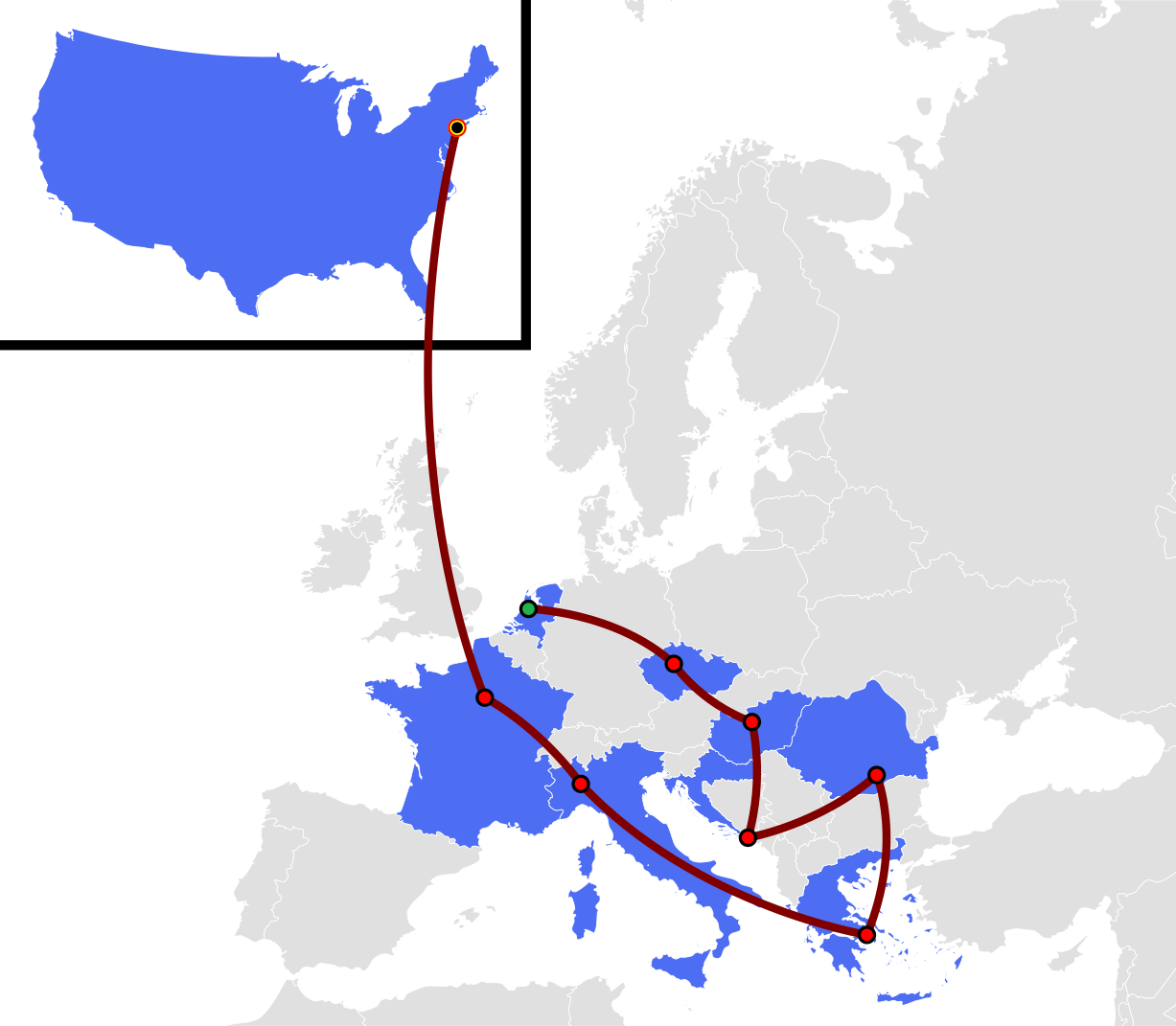
The route of The Amazing Race 38.

Destinations	Air travel Rail travel Water travel Bus travel Helicopter travel Bicycle travel Gondola travel
Route Markers	Detour Roadblock Fast Forward Express Pass Hazard; U-Turn Driver's Seat Scramble Pit Stop

=== Leg 1 (Netherlands) ===
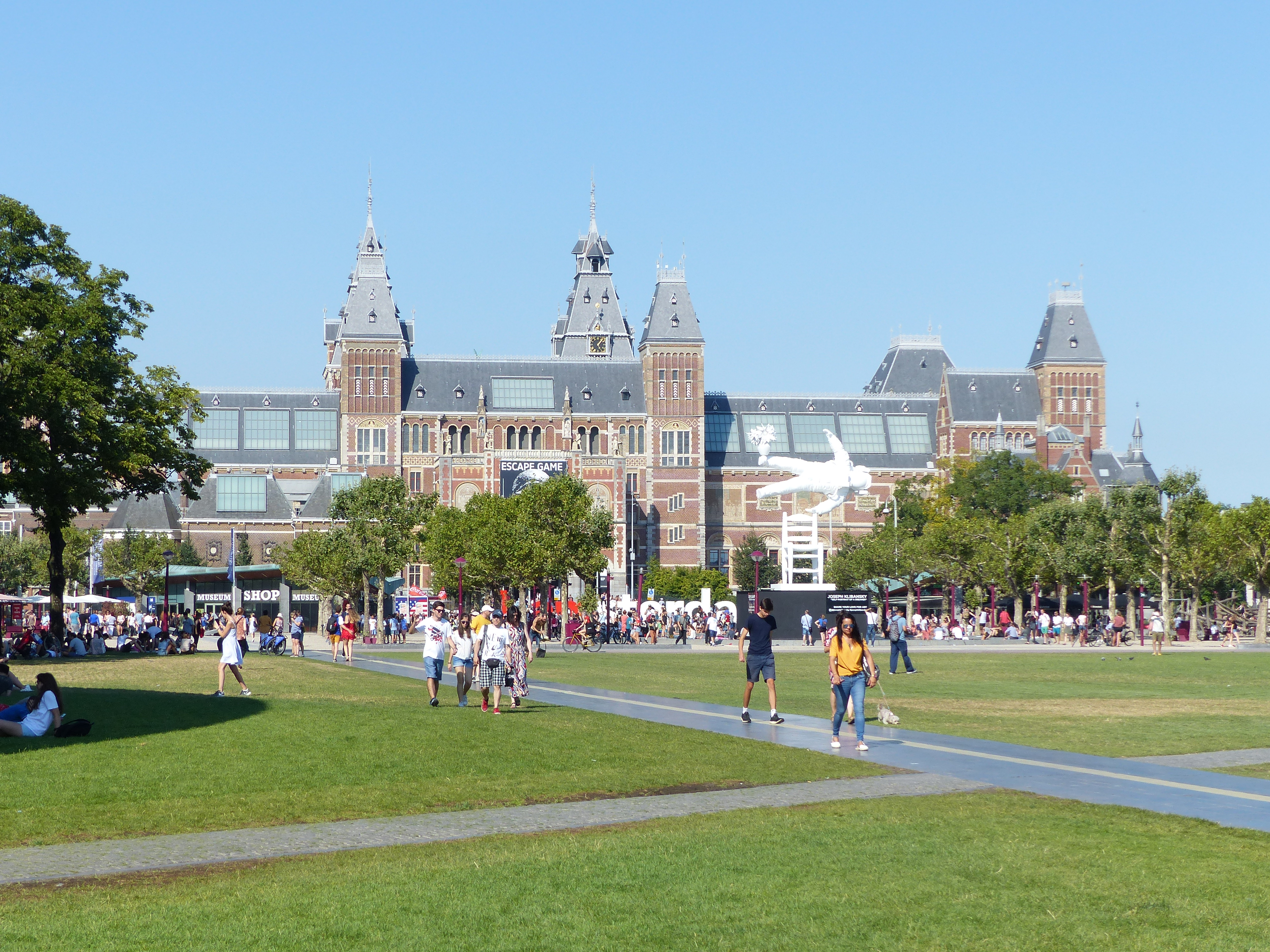
After racing through North Holland for the first leg, teams found the Pit Stop on the Museumplein in the heart of Amsterdam.

- Episode 1: "Two Worlds Colliding" (September 25, 2025)
- Prize: US$2,500 each (awarded to Jas and Jag)
- Eliminated: Jack and Enzo

Locations

- Hoorn, Netherlands (Hoorn Railway Station)
- Hoorn (IJsbaan De Westfries)
- Hoorn (Roode Steen – Grote Kerk) (Starting Line)
- Volendam (Port of Volendam)
- Edam (Edam Cheese Market)
- Volendam (Port of Volendam)
- Mijdrecht (Van der Wilt Gerbera's)
- Amsterdam (Museumplein)

Episode summary

- After arriving at the Hoorn railway station, teams were first instructed to travel by taxi to IJsbaan De Westfries and compete in a game of ice bowling. One team member had to push their partner on a sled down an ice rink towards a set of bowling pins. The first team to get a strike won two Express Passes, one for themselves and one to give to another team, and the last team to finish was penalized with a Hazard. Kyland and Taylor won the Express Pass and chose to give Jas and Jag the other Express Pass. Jack and Enzo were penalized with the Hazard.
- Teams then traveled to Grote Kerk to begin the race with their next clue instructing them to drive to the port of Volendam.
- The Hazard required Jack and Enzo to each eat a soused herring and later travel in a clog-shaped cargo bike to and from the Edam Cheese Market.
- Teams had to travel by tandem bicycle to the Edam Cheese Market. There, teams had to catch 30 balls of Edam cheese being unloaded off of a boat, stack them onto a wooden carrier, and deliver the cheese to a vendor to receive their next clue. Teams then had to return to the port of Volendam and drive to Van der Wilt Gerbera's.
- In this season's first Roadblock, one team member had to search an expansive greenhouse for nine types of flowers and arrange them in a display box before receiving their next clue, which directed them to the Pit Stop: the Museumplein.

=== Leg 2 (Netherlands → Czech Republic) ===
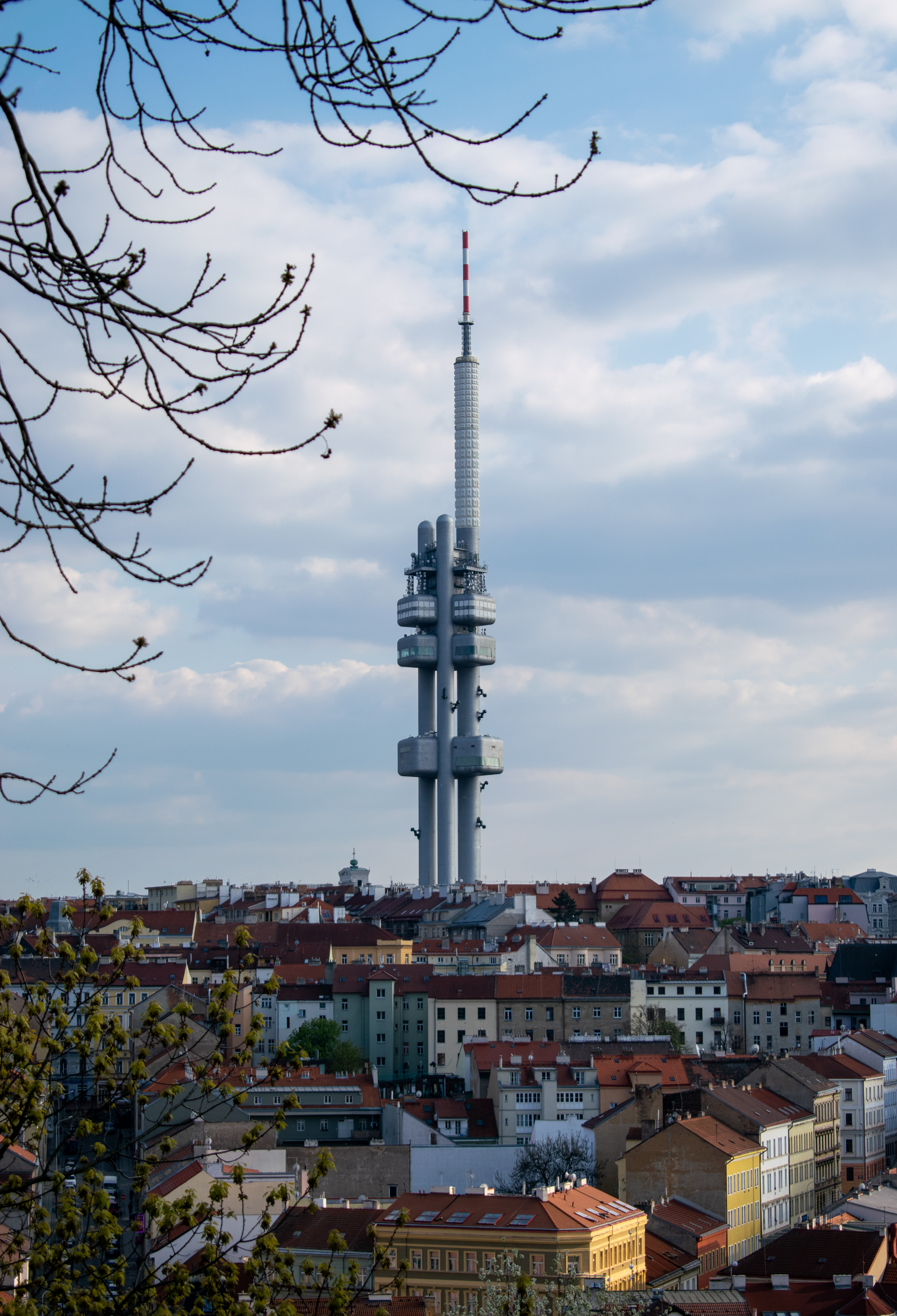
The Roadblock was set at the Žižkov Television Tower, the tallest structure in Prague.

- Episode 2: "Mom's Gonna Have the Willies" (October 1, 2025)
- Prize: Cashback rewards for a trip for two to Sri Lanka (awarded to Jas and Jag)
- Eliminated: Angela and Lexi

Locations

- Amsterdam (Museumplein)
- Amsterdam → Prague, Czech Republic
- Prague (Žižkov Television Tower)
- Prague (Křižovnické Náměstí – Statue of Charles IV)
- Prague (U Fleků or Staročeská Kavárna)
- Prague (Josef Mánes Statue)
- Prague (Žofín Palace)

Episode summary

- At the start of this leg, teams were instructed to travel by train to Prague, Czech Republic. Once there, teams had to travel by Prague Metro and on foot to the Žižkov Television Tower.
- In this leg's Roadblock, one team member had to walk across a narrow plank 255 feet (77 meters) above the ground on the Žižkov Television Tower and retrieve their next clue.
- After the Roadblock, teams had to travel by metro and on foot to their next clue by the statue of Charles IV, near Charles Bridge.
- This season's first Detour was a choice between Remember the Chair or Handle with Care. In Remember the Chair, teams had to memorize eleven village crests, search U Fleků for dining chairs with the same crests, memorize the villages associated with the crests, and reiterate the villages to a historian before receiving their next clue. In Handle with Care, teams had to deliver 48 Bohemian glass goblets to three vendors before receiving their next clue.
- After the Detour, teams had to travel on foot to the Josef Mánes statue near Rudolfinum and find their next clue. Teams then had to travel on foot to the Pit Stop: Žofín Palace.

Additional note

- Tucker and Eric arrived fourth, but had inadvertently skipped the Detour and had to backtrack to complete it; this did not affect their placement.

=== Leg 3 (Czech Republic) ===
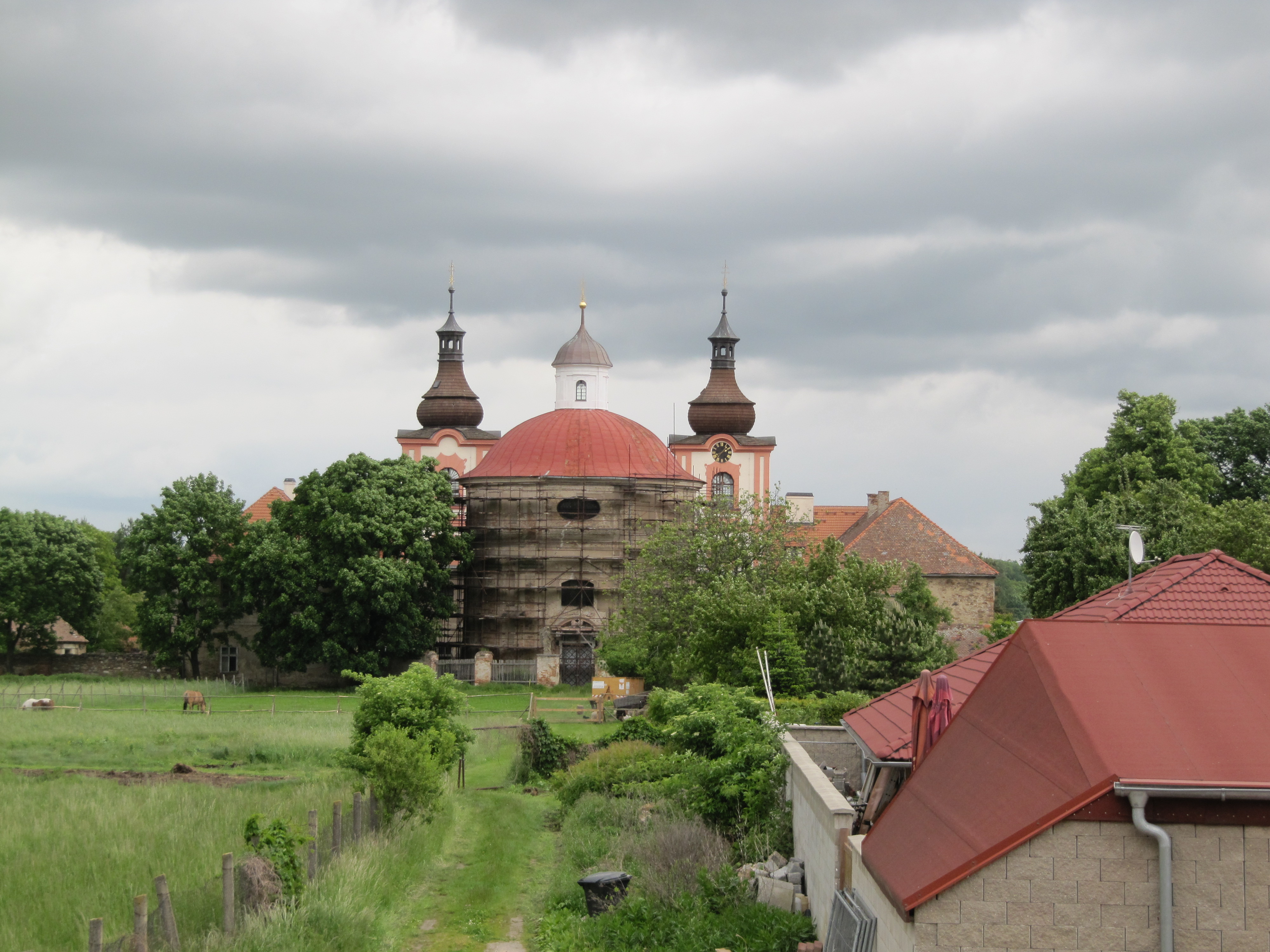
Teams visited Kostel sv. Anny and plowed a field for a clue while in the Central Bohemian Region.

- Episode 3: "Cry and Rally" (October 8, 2025)
- Prize: US$2,500 each (awarded to Natalie and Stephanie)
- Eliminated: Megan and Matt

Locations

- Prague (Žofín Palace)
- Kutná Hora (Kutná Hora Municipal Brewery)
- Nové Dvory (Kostel sv. Anny)
- Kutná Hora (Zimní Stadion Kutná Hora)
- Svatý Mikuláš (Kačina Château)

Episode summary

- At the start of this leg, teams were instructed to drive to Kutná Hora and search the municipal brewery for their next clue.
- In this leg's first Roadblock, one team member had to fill bottles with beer using a beer tap before receiving their next clue. Teams encountered a Driver's Seat at the Roadblock, where the first team to arrive determined how many crates of bottles racers had to fill. Natalie and Stephanie publicly assigned one crate to Izzy and Paige, and Hannah and Simone; two crates to themselves, Kristine and Rubina, Kyland and Taylor, Kat and Alex, and Megan and Matt; and three crates to Jas and Jag, Joseph and Adam, Tucker and Eric, and Jack and Chelsie.
- After the first Roadblock, teams had to drive to Nové Dvory and find their next clue at Kostel sv. Anny. There, one team member had to pull a plow called a ruchadlo through a field while their partner guided the plow until they unearthed their next clue, which directed them to drive to the Zimní Stadion Kutná Hora.
- In this leg's second Roadblock, one team member had to don ice hockey equipment and score a goal through one of five holes in a cutout to receive their next clue; teams could have the same person do both Roadblocks.
- After the second Roadblock, teams received a coin that depicted the Kačina Château in Svatý Mikuláš, the Pit Stop for this leg.

Additional note

- Megan and Matt got lost on their way to Kostel sv. Anny after the first Roadblock, causing them to fall behind the other teams. They arrived at the plowing task after all the other teams had checked in at the Pit Stop, so Phil came out to inform them of their elimination.

=== Leg 4 (Czech Republic → Hungary) ===
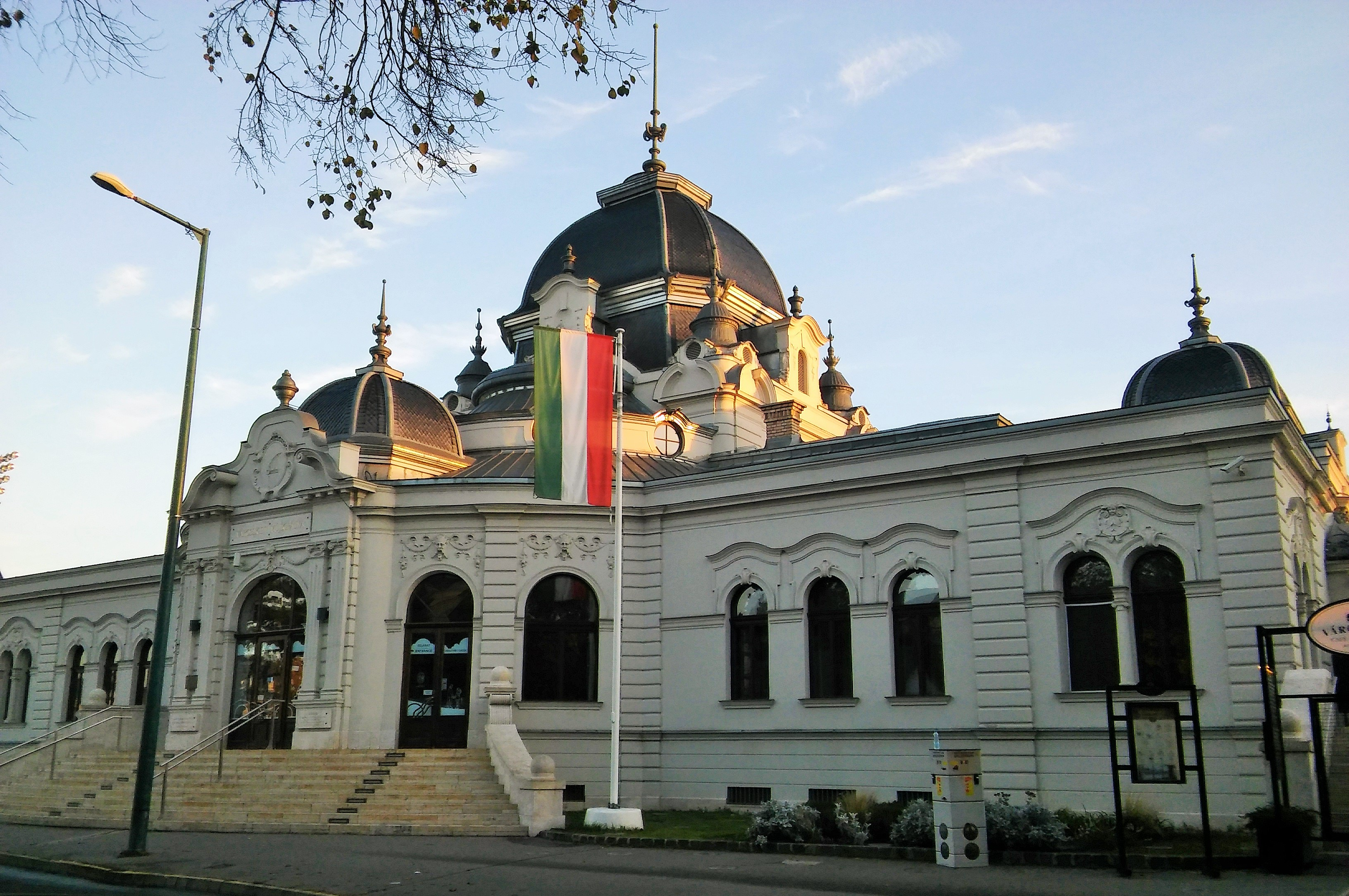
Teams had an opportunity to win a Fast Forward at the Városligeti Műjégpálya in Budapest by solving Rubik's Cubes.

- Episode 4: "What Would Houdini Do?" (October 15, 2025)
- Prize: Cashback rewards for a trip for two to La Paz, Bolivia (awarded to Tucker and Eric)
- Eliminated: Kat and Alex

Locations

- Prague (Senovážné Náměstí)
- Prague → Budapest, Hungary
- Budapest (Széchenyi Thermal Bath)
- Budapest (Városligeti Műjégpálya)
- Budapest (Ludovika Huszár Lovarda)
- Budapest (The House of Houdini)
- Budapest (Capital Circus of Budapest or Vasas Szakszervezeti Szövetség)
- Budapest (Várkert Bazár)

Episode summary

- At the start of this leg, teams were instructed to travel by train to Budapest, Hungary. Once there, teams had to find their next clue at the Széchenyi thermal bath. There, teams had to search the baths for chess players, who would give them a chess king with their next clue. Teams then had to travel on foot to their next clue outside of Városligeti Műjégpálya within City Park.
- For this season's only Fast Forward, one team had to solve a Rubik's Cube, given step-by-step directions for doing so. To succeed, each team member had to solve their own cube within 7.5 seconds on the same attempt. Tucker and Eric won the Fast Forward.
- Teams who did not attempt the Fast Forward had to travel by taxi to Ludovika Huszár Lovarda.
- In this leg's Roadblock, one team member had complete a csikós competition event by steering a horse-drawn coach through a figure 8 course within 45 seconds to receive their next clue.
- After the Roadblock, teams had to travel to The House of Houdini, where they had to unchain and unlock a box containing their next clue.
- This leg's Detour was a choice between Juggling Act or Balancing Act. In Juggling Act, teams had to juggle five rings for ten seconds to receive their next clue. In Balancing Act, teams had to perform a Hungarian folk dance, which involved balancing a bottle on one racer's head, to receive their next clue.
- After the Detour, teams had to check in at the Pit Stop: the Várkert Bazár beneath Buda Castle.

=== Leg 5 (Hungary → Croatia) ===
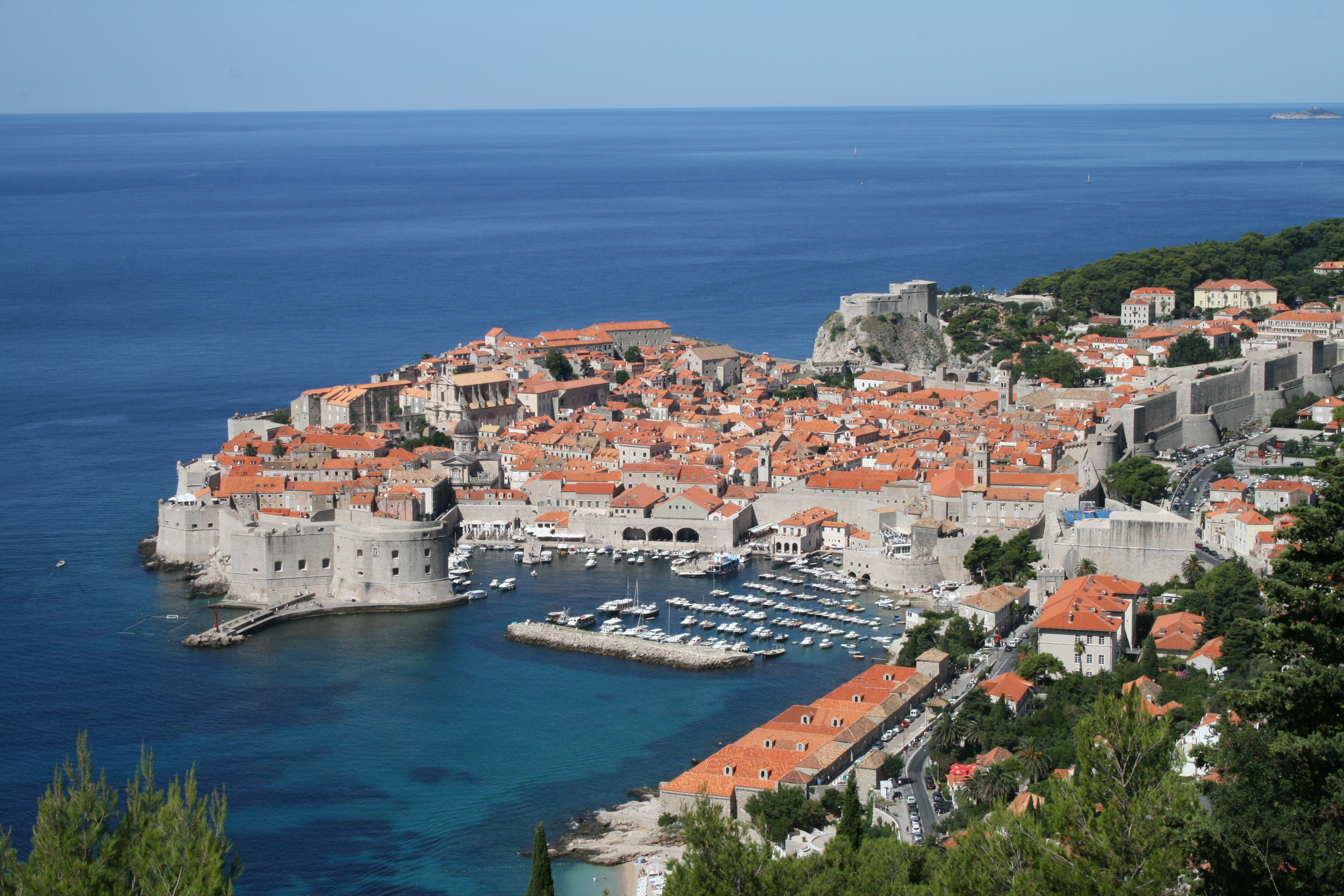
The fifth leg of the race was set in the Old Town of Dubrovnik, with the Detour focused in its Old Port.

- Episode 5: "I Wanna Be a Little Angry Right Now" (October 22, 2025)
- Prize: US$2,500 each (awarded to Tucker and Eric)
- Eliminated: Hannah and Simone

Locations

- Budapest (Corinthia Hotel Budapest)
- Budapest → Dubrovnik, Croatia
- Dubrovnik (Monument of Ivan Gundulić)
- Dubrovnik (Dubrovnik West Harbour, Bota Šare & Old Port or Old Port)
- Dubrovnik (Buža Bar)
- Dubrovnik (Ploće Gate)
- Dubrovnik (Fort Revelin & Ulica Svetog Dominika)
- Dubrovnik (Fort Bokar)

Episode summary

- At the start of this leg, teams were instructed to fly to Dubrovnik, Croatia. Once there, teams found their next clue by the Monument of Ivan Gundulić.
- This leg's Detour was a choice between Fisherman Haul or Skin 'Em All. In Fisherman Haul, teams had to procure fishing nets from the west harbour and a bucket of chum from Bota Šare and then deliver them on foot to the old port before receiving their next clue. In Skin 'Em All, teams had to make their way to the old port and fillet two monkfish before receiving their next clue.
- After the Detour, teams had to find their next clue outside of the city walls at Buža Bar. Teams then had to travel on foot to the Ploće Gate.
- In this leg's Roadblock, one team member had to assemble a cart called a karići and then roll down a street within 36 seconds before receiving their next clue, which directed them to the Pit Stop: Fort Bokar.

Additional note

- This leg featured a Double U-Turn. Jag and Jas chose to use the U-Turn on Izzy and Paige, while Joseph and Adam chose to use the U-Turn on Kristine and Rubina.

=== Leg 6 (Croatia) ===
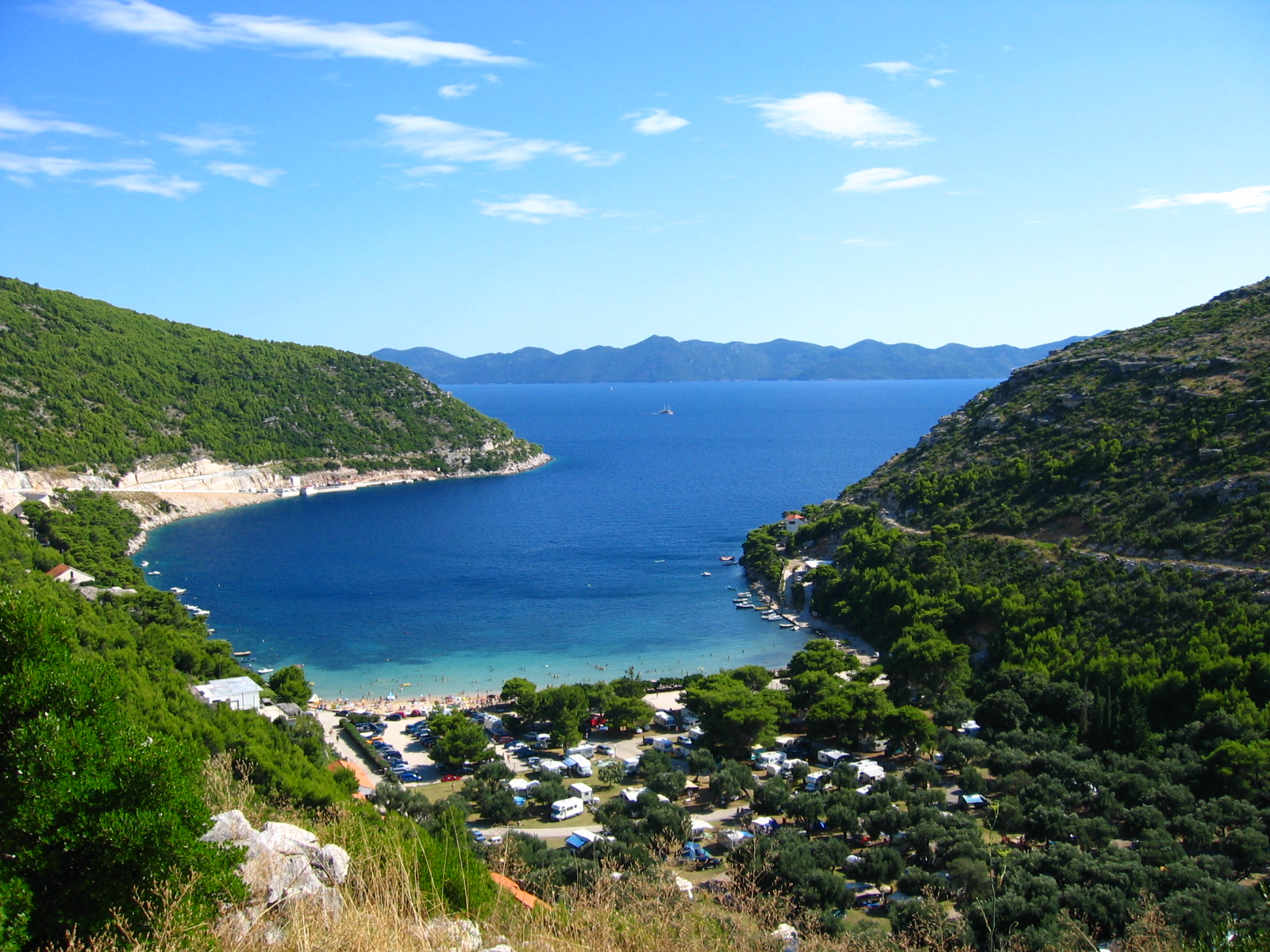
Teams drove up the Dalmatian Coast and into the Pelješac peninsula during the sixth leg before finishing in the port village of Prapratno.

- Episode 6: "The System Hacked Me" (October 29, 2025)
- Prize: Cashback rewards for a trip for two to Cairo, Egypt (awarded to Tucker and Eric)
- Eliminated: Kristine and Rubina

Locations

- Dubrovnik (Fort Bokar)
- Trsteno (Trsteno Arboretum)
- Ston (Solana Ston) or Mali Ston (Mali Ston Bay & Bota Šare Restaurant)
- Ston (Park Komarda)
- Prapratno (Prapratno Cove)

Episode summary

- At the start of this leg, teams were instructed to drive to the Trsteno Arboretum and find their next clue by the Neptune fountain.
- This leg's Detour was a choice between Bag It Up or Pull It Up. In Bag It Up, teams had to load a wheelbarrow with salt, fill ten bags with 20 to 21 pounds of salt, and then deliver them to a shipping area to receive their next clue. In Pull It Up, teams had to row a boat into Mali Ston Bay, pull up three buoys with oysters, and then deliver the oysters to a restaurant in exchange for their next clue.
- After the Detour, teams found their next clue at Park Komarda.
- In this leg's Roadblock, one team member had to study a raised-relief map of Ston, find three checky shields that each displayed three facts about Croatia, and then answer three questions to receive their next clue, which directed them to the Pit Stop: Prapratno Cove.

=== Leg 7 (Croatia → Romania) ===
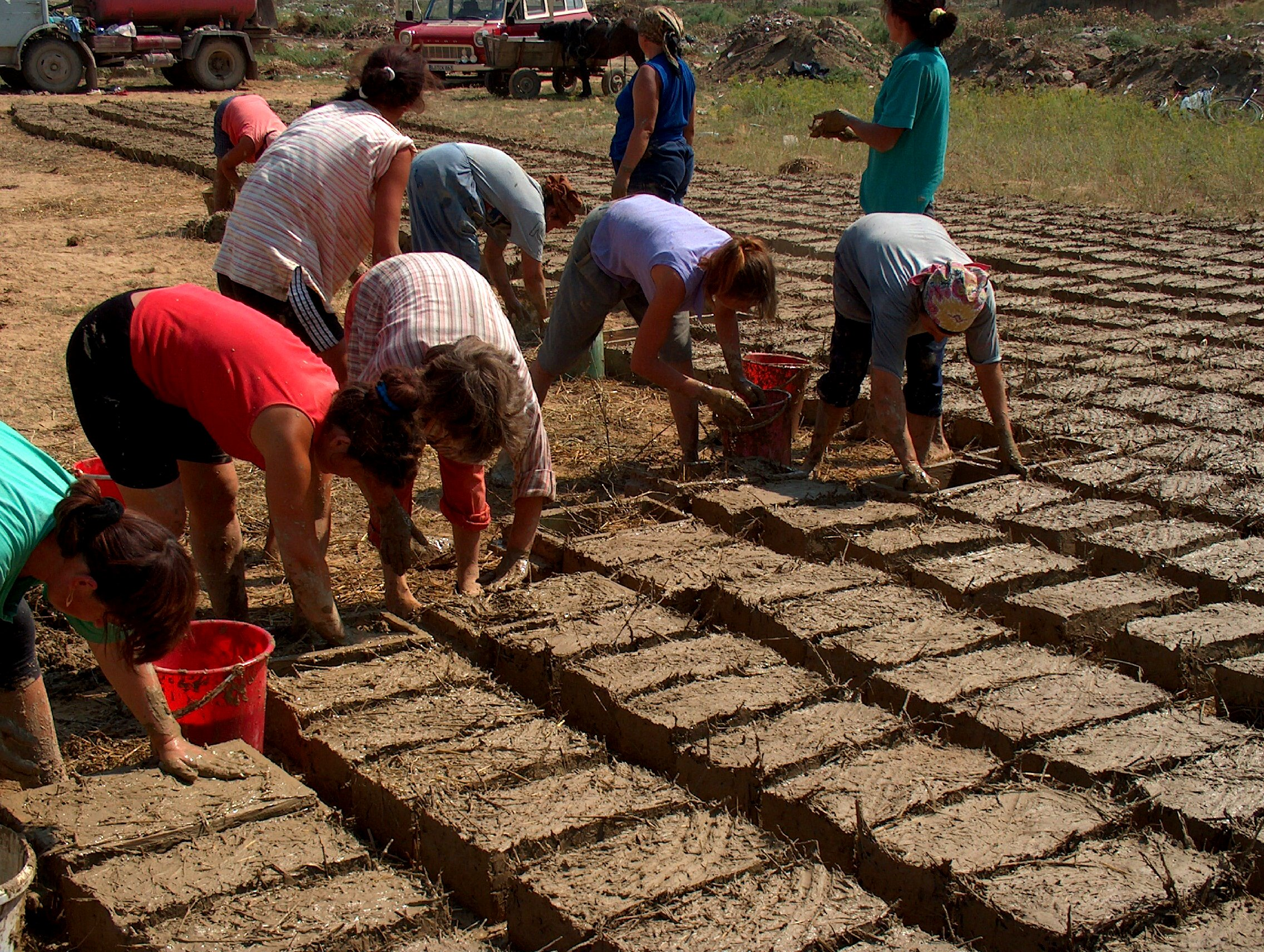
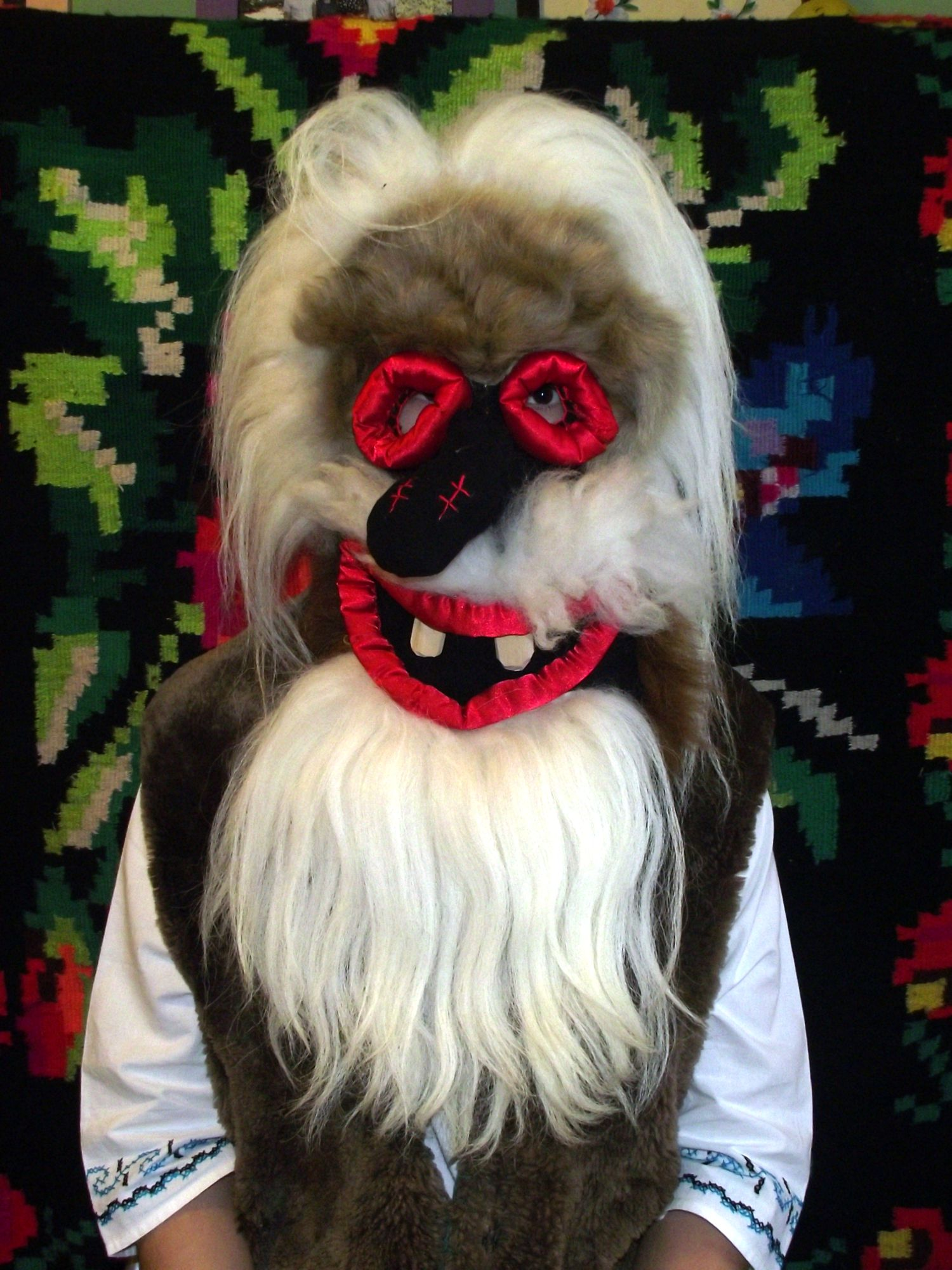
Teams had the option of making bricks or masks during the Detour in Romania.
- Episode 7: "It Feels Like Falling the Whole Time" (November 5, 2025)
- Prize: US$5,000 each (awarded to Tucker and Eric)
- Eliminated: Natalie and Stephanie

Locations

- Dubrovnik (Valamar Lacroma Hotel)
- Split (Smokvina Travel)
- Split → Bucharest, Romania
- Clinceni (Clinceni Airfield – TNT Brothers Skydiving)
- Comana (Comana Airfield)
- Comana (Sheep Farm)
- Comana (Comana Natural Park – Debarcader Lebăda)
- Comana (Comana Natural Park – Neajlov River Delta)
- Comana (Strada Sfântul Dumitru Farm or The Paper Mill)
- Bucharest (Carol Park)

Episode summary

- At the start of this leg, teams were instructed to fly to Bucharest, Romania, with teams required to book their flight at Smokvina Travel in Split. Once there, teams found their next clue at TNT Brothers Skydiving.
- In this leg's Roadblock, one team member had to perform the highest tandem skydive in Amazing Race history from a height of 13,000 feet (4,000 m) before receiving their next clue after landing at the Comana Airfield.
- After the Roadblock, teams had to travel on foot to a nearby sheep farm. There, teams had to corral five sheep marked with blue paint into a pen to receive their next clue. Teams then had to drive to Debarcader Lebăda, where they had to assemble a pontoon boat and paddle out to their next clue in the Neajlov river delta.
- This leg's Detour was a choice between Brick Builder or Mask Maker. In Brick Builder, teams had to mold ten bricks called chirpici out of clay, straw, manure, and water to receive their next clue. In Mask Maker, teams had to sew together two masks, normally used to ward off evil spirits for the New Year, to receive their next clue.
- After the Detour, teams had to check in at the Pit Stop: Carol Park.

=== Leg 8 (Romania) ===
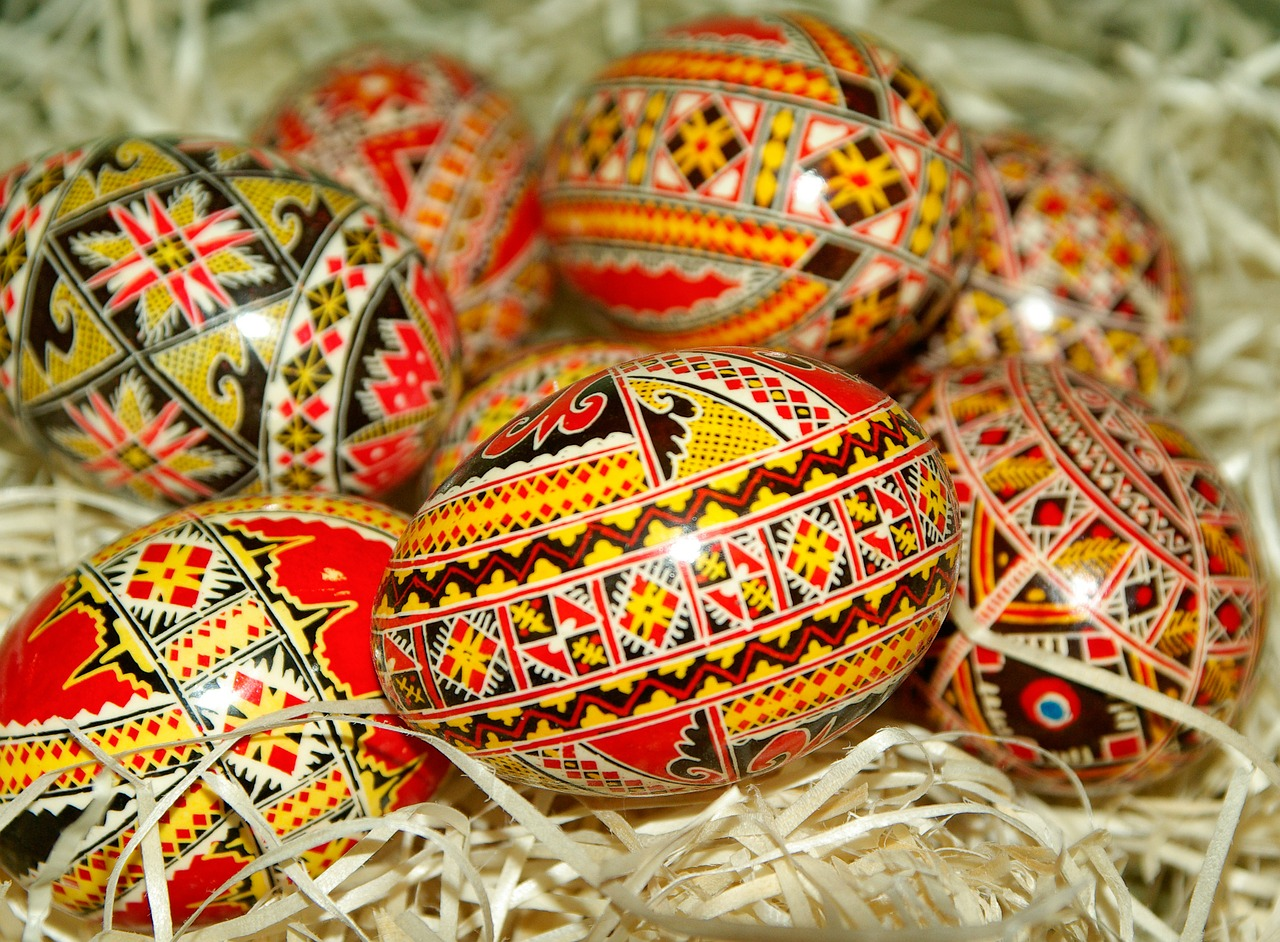
One team member had to go on an Easter egg hunt during the Roadblock in Herăstrău Park, the largest public park in Bucharest.

- Episode 8: "Oh Egg, Where Art Thou" (November 12, 2025)
- Prize: Cashback rewards for a trip for two to Bermuda (awarded to Jas and Jag)

Locations

- Bucharest (Carol Park)
- Bucharest (Herăstrău Park)
- Bucharest (Palace of the Parliament)
- Bucharest (Palatul Camerei de Comerț București or Casa Grădișteanu Ghica)
- Bucharest (Green Hours Jazz & Theatre Café)
- Mogoșoaia (Mogoșoaia Palace)

Episode summary

- At the start of this leg, teams were instructed to travel to Herăstrău Park and find their next clue.
- In this leg's Roadblock, one team member had to hunt among numerous intricately-decorated Easter egg hidden in a grassy field for one that matched a giant egg and then roll the giant egg into a nest before receiving their next clue. Jag and Jas used their Express Pass to bypass this task.
- After the Roadblock, teams received a postcard depicting the Palace of the Parliament, where they found their next clue.
- This leg's Detour was a choice between Find the Beat or Hit the Note. In Find the Beat, teams had to perform a Transylvanian folk dance to receive their next clue. In Hit the Note, teams had to assemble two nai pan flutes and then play a tune to receive their next clue. Kyland and Taylor used their Express Pass to bypass this task.
- After the Detour, teams traveled to the Green Hours Jazz & Theatre Café, where both team members had to roll ten mici sausages and then each eat a grilled sausage before receiving their next clue directing them to the Pit Stop: Mogoșoaia Palace.

Additional note

- This was a non-elimination leg.

=== Leg 9 (Romania → Greece) ===
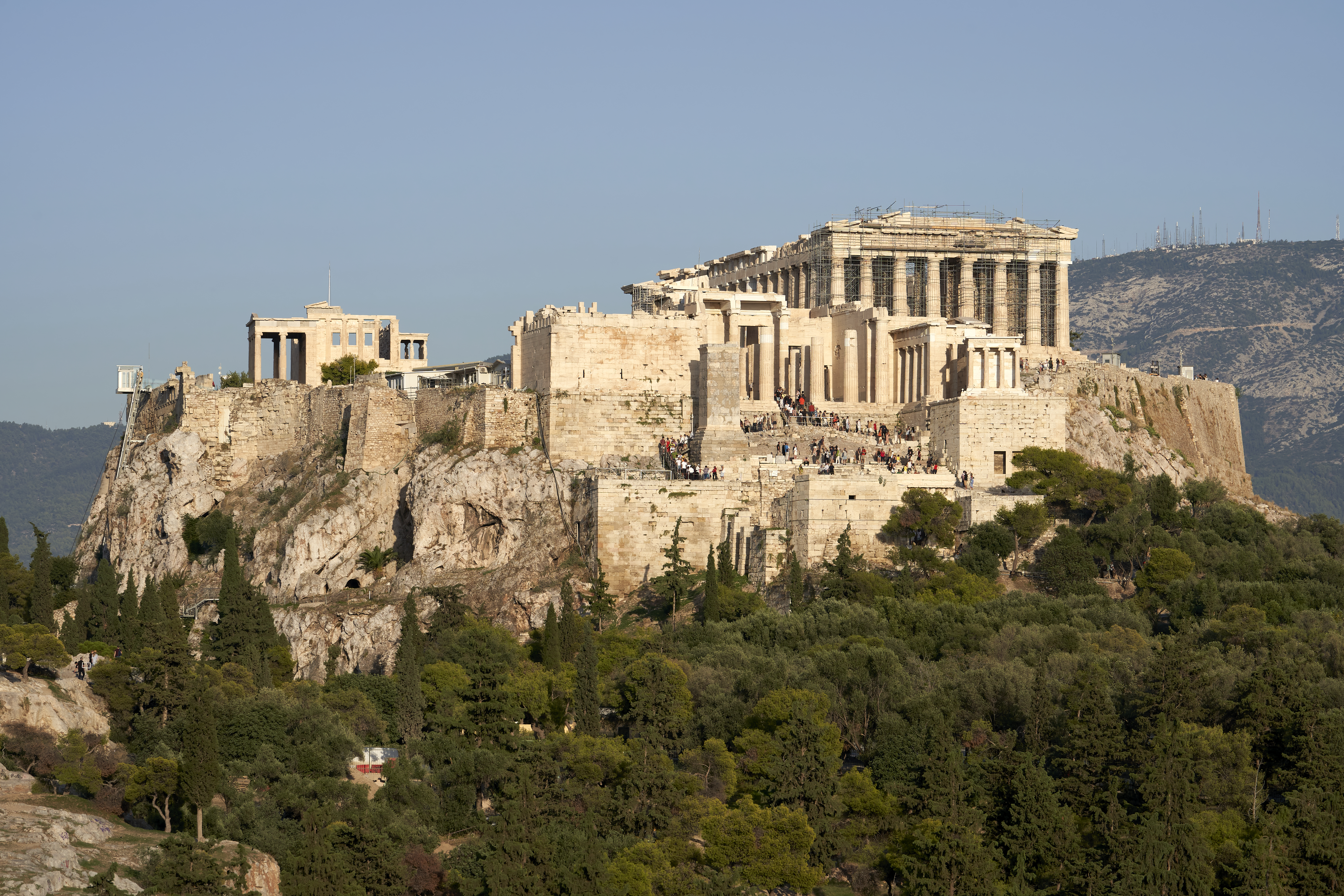
Near the Parthenon and the Acropolis of Athens in the birthplace of democracy, teams voted to U-Turn each other.

- Episode 9: "I'm Not a Big Fan of Olives" (November 19, 2025)
- Prize: Cashback rewards for a trip for two to Siem Reap, Cambodia (awarded to Jas and Jag)
- Eliminated: Tucker and Eric

Locations

- Bucharest (Romanian Athenaeum)
- Bucharest → Athens, Greece
- Athens (Pnyka Hill – National Observatory of Athens)
- Athens (Acropolis of Athens)
- Athens (Klafthmonos Square & Monastiraki Square or Ariana Olives)
- Athens (Hill of Muses)
- Athens (Dora Stratou Theatre)
- Athens (Kotzia Square)

Episode summary

- At the start of this leg, teams were instructed to fly to Athens, Greece. Once there, teams had to travel to Pnyka Hill, where Phil Keoghan surprised them with a Live U-Turn Vote. After the vote, teams had to search the Acropolis for a man with an Amazing Race flag and their next clue.
- This season's final Detour was a choice between Music in the Air or Olives Everywhere. In Music in the Air, teams had to bring a crank-operated piano called a laterna to Monastiraki Square and earn ten euros from passersby to receive their next clue. In Olives Everywhere, teams had to sample ten varieties of olives and then correctly identify them to receive their next clue.
- After the Detour, teams had to roll a boulder up the Hill of Muses to Sisyphus, who had their next clue sending them to the Dora Stratou Theatre.
- In this leg's Roadblock, one team member had to memorize and recite the 24 lowercase letters of the Greek alphabet before receiving their next clue, which directed them to the Pit Stop: Kotzia Square.

Additional note

- Teams encountered a Live U-Turn Vote. As a penalty for finishing last in the previous leg, Joseph and Adam received a penalty vote. Each team voted for two teams, with the top two vote recipients intended to be U-Turned. Tucker and Eric received a majority of votes with Jas and Jag and Kyland and Taylor tied for second place. A revote was held between the two tied teams. As the vote was deadlocked following the revote, three teams were U-Turned instead of two. The teams' votes were as follows:

U-Turn Vote results
Team	Vote		Revote
Joseph & Adam	Tucker & Eric	Jack & Chelsie	Kyland & Taylor
Tucker & Eric	Kyland & Taylor	Jas & Jag	Kyland & Taylor
Jack & Chelsie	Kyland & Taylor	Jas & Jag	Jas & Jag
Jas & Jag	Kyland & Taylor	Tucker & Eric	Kyland & Taylor
Izzy & Paige	Tucker & Eric	Jas & Jag	Jas & Jag
Kyland & Taylor	Tucker & Eric	Izzy & Paige	Jas & Jag
Penalty vote	Joseph & Adam		—N/a

=== Leg 10 (Greece → Italy) ===
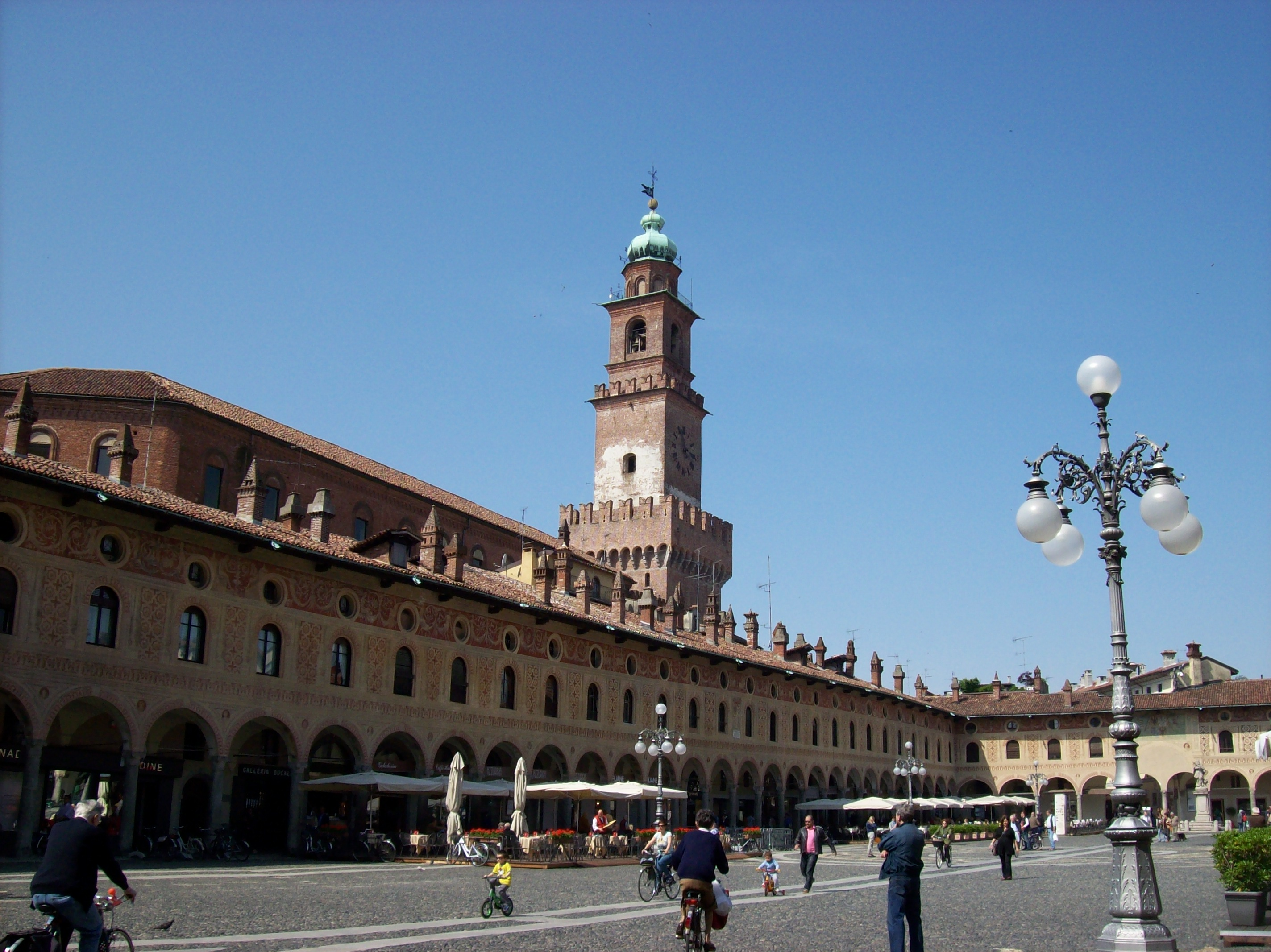
Teams visited the city of Vigevano during the tenth leg in Lombardy.

- Episode 10: "It's Hard Not to Feel Hopeless" (November 26, 2025)
- Prize: US$7,500 each (awarded to Jas and Jag)
- Eliminated: Jack and Chelsie

Locations

- Athens (Kotzia Square)
- Athens (Dimidis Tours)
- Athens → Milan, Italy (Milan Malpensa Airport)
- Milan (Rotonda della Besana)
- Vigevano (Visconti-Sforza Castle)
- Vigevano (Mulino di Mora Bassa)
- Corbetta (Villa Borri Manzoli)

Episode summary

- At the start of this leg, teams were instructed to fly to Milan, Italy, with teams required to book their flight at Dimidis Tours. Once there, teams found their next clue outside of the airport and had to drive to Rotonda della Besana.
- In this leg's first Roadblock, one team member had to replicate a floral dress by pinning flowers on a mannequin to receive their next clue.
- After the first Roadblock, teams had to drive to the Visconti-Sforza Castle in Vigevano.
- In this leg's second Roadblock, one team member had to complete two Palio games. First, they had to build a replica of the Torre del Bramante. Then, they had to ride a wooden horse and spear four rings with a jousting lance to receive their next clue.
- After the second Roadblock, teams had to drive to Mulino di Mora Bassa. There, teams had to assemble a self-supporting bridge designed by Leonardo da Vinci to receive their next clue, which directed them to the Pit Stop: the Villa Borri Manzoli.

Additional note

- Adam became dizzy during the first Roadblock, which required medics to intervene and treat his conditions, as Joseph expressed his concern. As a precaution, the mannequin was moved out of sunlight into shade.

=== Leg 11 (Italy → France) ===
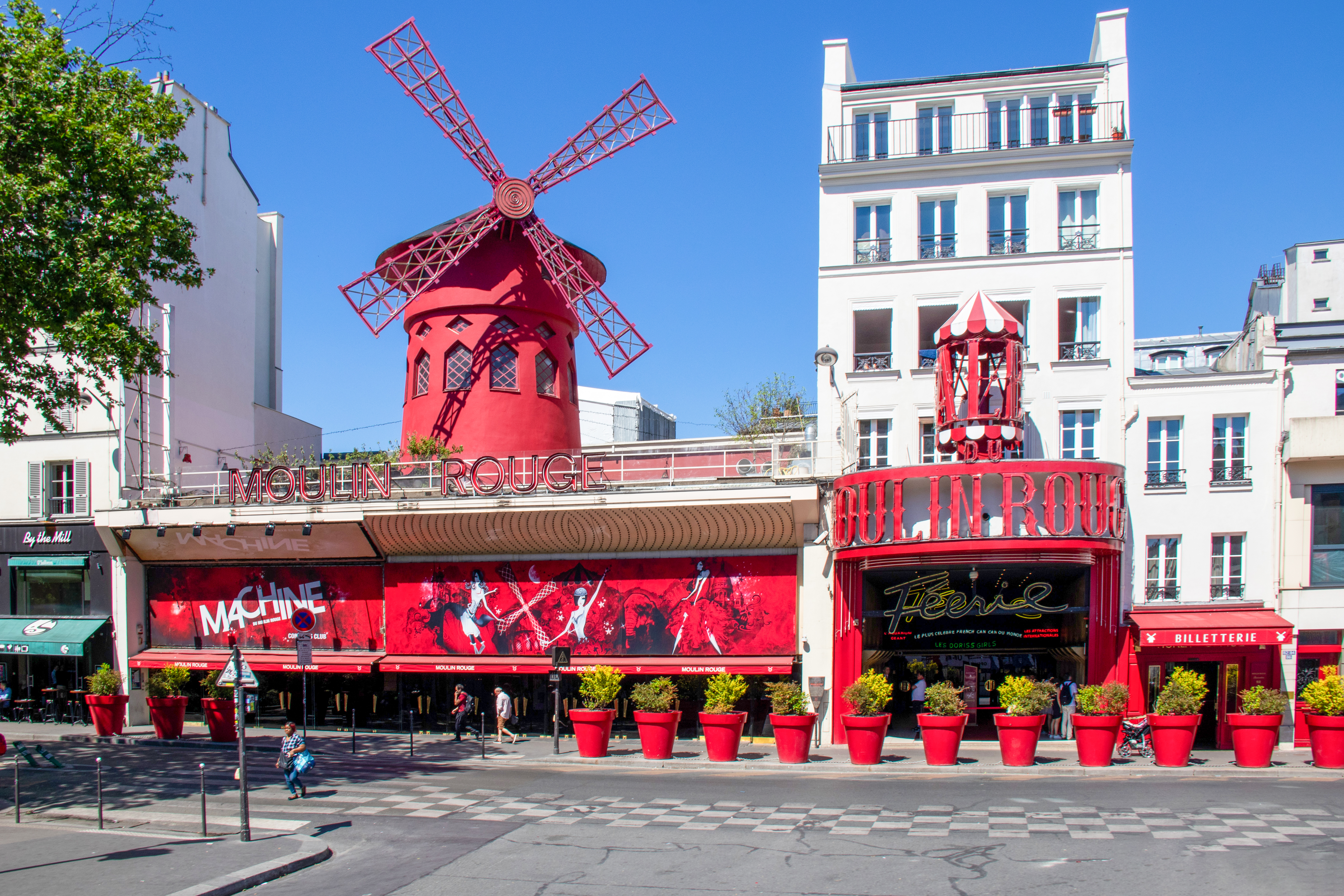
For their first task in Paris, teams had to perform a can-can at the Moulin Rouge.

- Episode 11: "The Can't Can't" (December 3, 2025)
- Prize: Cashback rewards for a trip for two to Fiji (awarded to Jas and Jag)
- Eliminated: Izzy and Paige (Note: The eleventh episode ended on a cliffhanger with Joseph & Adam and Izzy & Paige searching for the Pit Stop. The subsequent episode began with Joseph & Adam beating out Izzy & Paige.)

Locations

- Corbetta (Villa Borri Manzoli)
- Milan → Paris, France
- Paris (Moulin Rouge)
- Paris (Notre-Dame de Paris)
- Paris (Institut National des Jeunes Aveugles)
- Paris (Île aux Cygnes, Jardin du Luxembourg & Musée des Arts et Métiers)
- Paris (Place du Trocadéro)

Episode summary

- During the Pit Stop, teams had to book a flight to Paris, France, using a mobile app. Once there, teams had to travel by taxi to the Moulin Rouge and perform a can-can with a group of backup dancers to receive their next clue. Teams then had to travel to the Notre-Dame cathedral and find their next clue, which sent them to the Institut National des Jeunes Aveugles.
- In this season's final Roadblock, one team member had to type "The New Colossus" in braille using a Perkins Brailler braille typewriter to receive their next clue.
- After the Roadblock, teams encountered a Scramble, where they had to travel to three replicas of the Statue of Liberty in Paris and retrieve a clue piece at each statue that, when assembled, formed a replica of the Pit Stop: the Place du Trocadéro, overlooking the Eiffel Tower.

=== Leg 12 (France → United States) ===
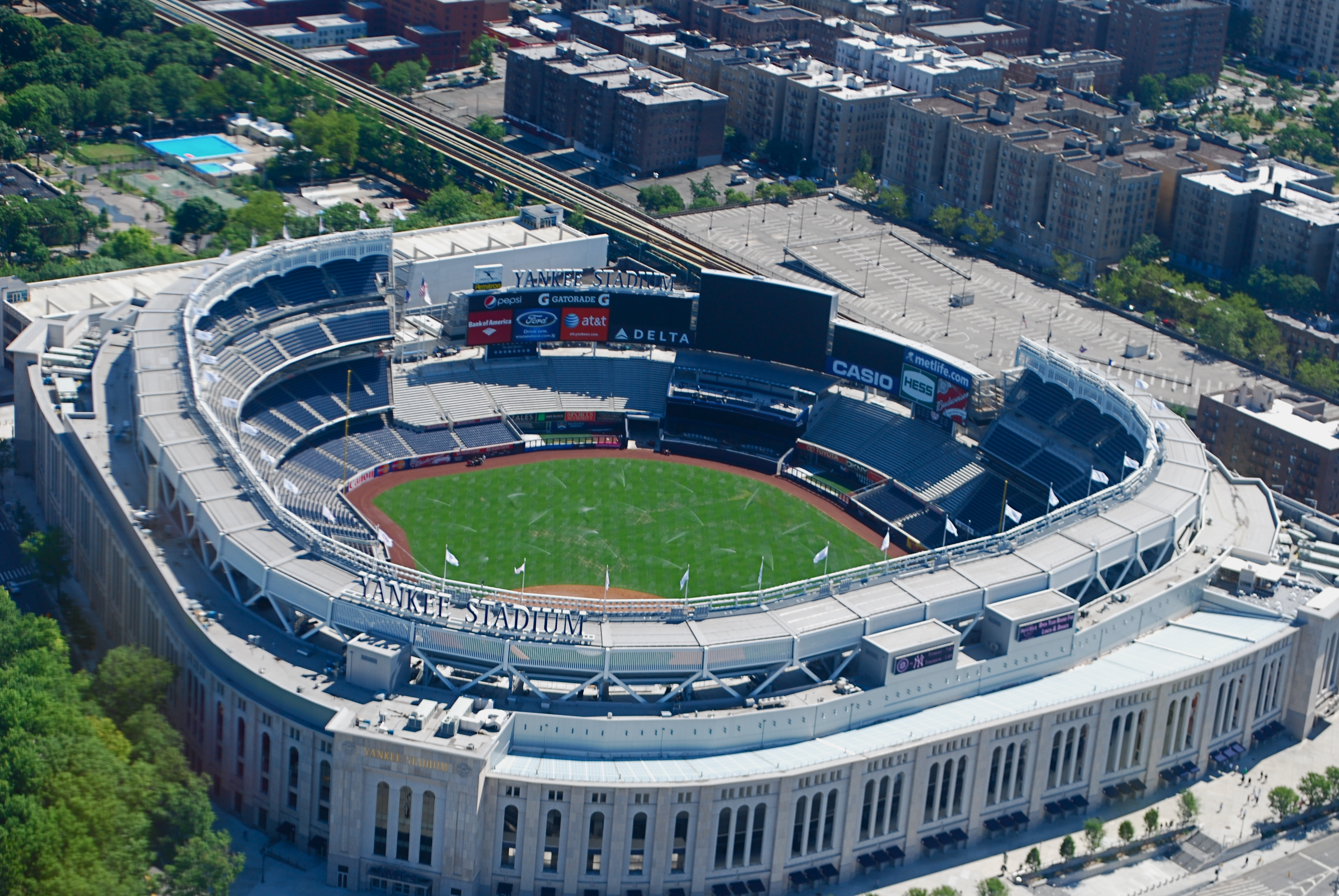
The finish line following the European Adventure of The Amazing Race was at the home of the New York Yankees: Yankee Stadium.

- Episode 12: "One Million Cookies" (December 10, 2025)
- Prize: US$1,000,000
- Winners: Jas and Jag
- Runners-up: Kyland and Taylor
- Third place: Joseph and Adam

Locations

- Paris (Place du Trocadéro)
- Paris → New York City, New York
- New York City (Empire State Building)
- New York City (Epices Bakery)
- New York City (Sesame Workshop)
- New York City (Spandex House)
- New York City (Fashion Institute of Technology – Feldman Center)
- New York City (Greenpoint – Seret Studios)
- New York City (Yankee Stadium)

Episode summary

- At the start of this leg, teams were instructed to fly to New York City, New York. Once there, teams had to travel to the Empire State Building in Manhattan and find their next clue. There, teams had to rappel 13 stories down the building's spire from a height of over 1,200 feet to receive their next clue.
- From the Empire State Building, teams had to travel to Epices Bakery, retrieve an order of cookies, and deliver them to Cookie Monster at Sesame Workshop before receiving their next clue from Oscar the Grouch sending them to Spandex House.
- At Spandex House, teams had to choose an order form with five fabric swatches of specified quantities, retrieve 16 bolts of fabric, and deliver them across the Garment District to a fashion student outside of the Feldman Center of the Fashion Institute of Technology to receive their next clue, which sent them to Seret Studios in Brooklyn.
- For their final memory challenge, teams had to solve a crossword puzzle. Once complete, several letters were highlighted, which teams had to unscramble to find the finish line: Yankee Stadium. The correct answers were:

Correct answers: Across
Entry	Hint	Answer
2 Across	Ivan Gundulic's City	Dubrovnik
4 Across	Race has 12, you have 2	Legs
6 Across	First strike	Express Pass
8 Across	Last strike	Hazard
10 Across	Self supporting bridge designer	Da Vinci
12 Across	Hungary $$$	Forint
14 Across	1st Pit Stop	Museumplein
16 Across	The Greek one ends omega	Alphabet
18 Across	Czech Republic capital city	Prague
20 Across	This puzzle	Crossword
22 Across	Participants only	Roadblock
24 Across	Romanian search	Egg
26 Across	Can you ___?	Can-can
28 Across	Blue clues	Route Info
30 Across	Always ___ your clue!	Read
32 Across	You voted here	Pnyx Hill
34 Across	Croatia Double U-Turn location	Buža Bar
36 Across	Silent greeter	Mime

Correct answers: Down
Entry	Hint	Answer
1 Down	Thermal bath city	Budapest
3 Down	Equipment on ice	Skates
5 Down	Palio town	Vigevano
7 Down	Kutna Hora nickname	Silver City
9 Down	Yellow clue	Detour
11 Down	Greece's capital city	Athens
13 Down	Elimination station	Pit Stop
15 Down	Don't lose it	Passport
17 Down	Romanian sausage	Mici
19 Down	Caution! ___ ahead!	Double U-Turn
21 Down	Freefall	Skydive
23 Down	Human ice bowl goal	Strike
25 Down	Neptune's spot	Arboretum
27 Down	Chess piece	King
29 Down	Czech cash	Koruna
31 Down	Fresh as a ___	Daisy
33 Down	Croatian carts	Karići
34 Down	Tactile alphabet	Braille
35 Down	Floated on to clue	Pontoon
37 Down	Pit Stop Bucharest	Carol Park

== Production ==
=== Development and filming ===
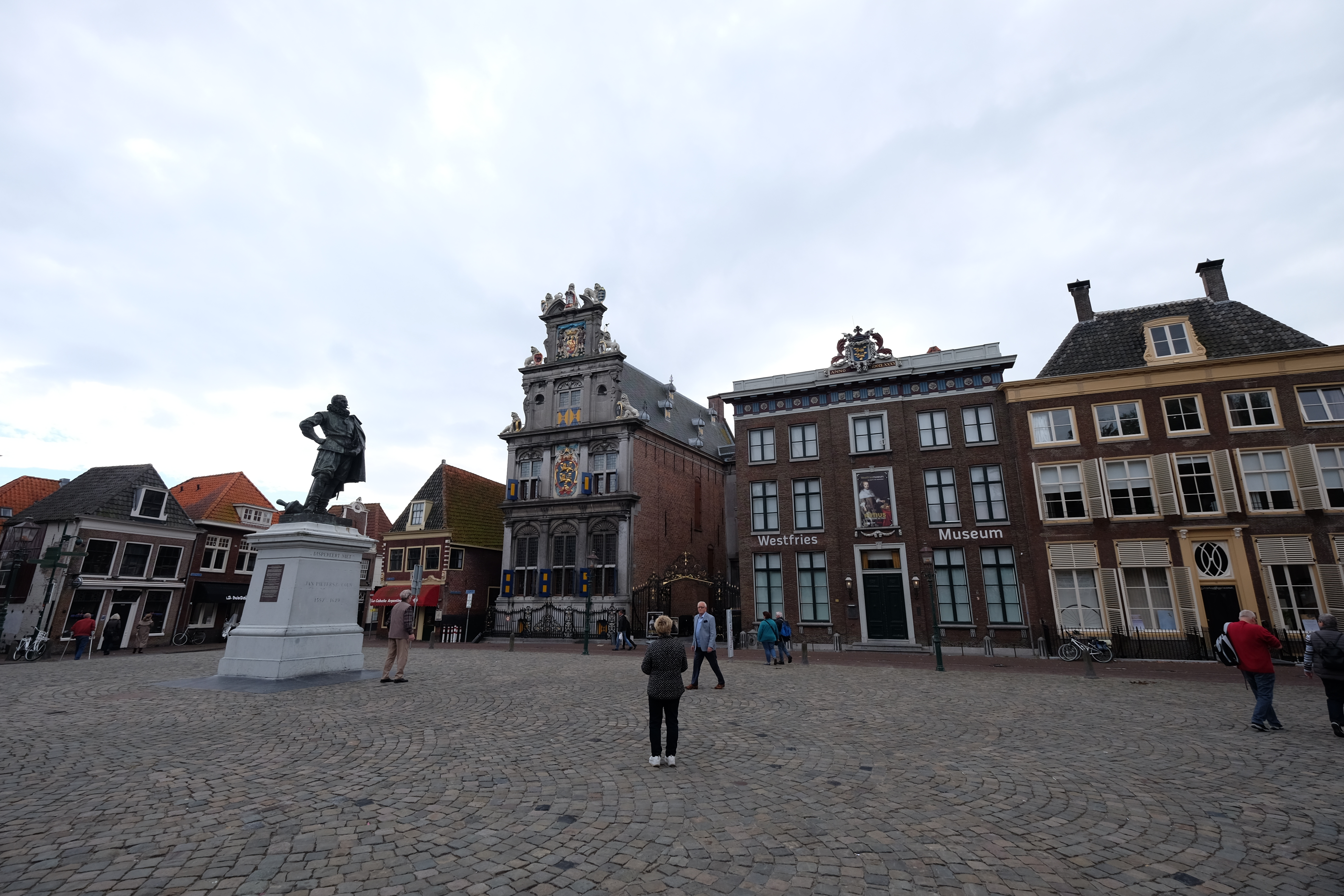
In the Netherlands, the birthplace of the Big Brother franchise, teams gathered at Roode Steen in Hoorn to begin The Amazing Race 38.

In an interview with Rob Cesternino on Rob Has a Podcast on February 1, 2025, Will Kirby stated that The Amazing Race was bringing in former reality contestants for its upcoming season. On February 6, 2025, reports circulated that the season would feature former Big Brother Houseguests as racers. Phil Keoghan officially confirmed the makeup of the cast in an Entertainment Tonight interview with Big Brother host Julie Chen Moonves prior to the premiere of Big Brother 27 on July 10, 2025.

Teams went into sequester on March 11, 2025. On March 16, 2025, teams were spotted in Los Angeles International Airport and Detroit Metropolitan Airport traveling to the Netherlands, where the Big Brother franchise originated. Filming for this season then began on March 17, 2025, with teams starting in the city of Hoorn. The second leg filmed on March 19, 2025, in Prague, Czech Republic. On March 25, 2025, teams were spotted in Dubrovnik, Croatia. By the end of March, teams had traveled to Bucharest, Romania. The tenth leg filmed in Italy on April 5, 2025. Filming for this season concluded on April 9, 2025, in New York City. When asked by TMZ following filming if the policies of the second Trump administration affected this season's production, Keoghan responded that there were not any difficulties. The Hazard returned this season for the first time since season 19 alongside the Driver's Seat and the Scramble.

=== Casting ===
Casting calls for this season occurred in late October 2024. Casting finals took place in February 2025.

- Janelle Pierzina (who raced on season 31), Xavier Prather, and Danielle Reyes were considered but declined due to a low appearance fee offer.
- Josh Martinez and his sister Maytee Martinez were in the mix but were cut.
- Cory Wurtenberger and his brother, Survivor 42 castaway Zach Wurtenberger, were alternates that did not make the final cast.
- Haleigh Broucher was contacted to compete but had to decline due to her school schedule.
- Cirie Fields was contacted by Izzy Gleicher as a potential partner but declined.
- Jun Song was contacted to compete with her brother, but the latter declined.
- Jen Johnson was in the casting process for this season.

== Reception ==
=== Critical response ===
Prior to the season's premiere, reactions towards the casting theme were largely negative with Ryan DeVault of TV Fanatic calling the decision "a huge mistake" as it "pigeon-holes the audience and could alienate viewers who are uninterested in watching reality stars compete on the show." These concerns were largely unchanged by the end of the season. Andy Dehnart of reality blurred wrote that the season had its charms with "many of the legs required driving, taking public transportation, and walking—a refreshing change of pace for the race" but in the end was an "uneven season". Nick Caruso of TVLine called it the "most predictable season of The Amazing Race". Marcus James Dixon of GoldDerby called the season underwhelming. Mick Joest of Cinemablend was critical towards the predictability of Jas and Jag's win writing that "[Jag Bains] had a target on his back going into The Amazing Race, but thanks to an early Express Pass and his equally competitive brother, none of the other teams ever really stood a chance of taking them out." In September 2026, Phil Keoghan acknowledged, "Inherently, what we learned is that Big Brother and The Amazing Race are really quite different types of reality shows, and that our audiences, there's not a huge amount of crossover, which I think speaks to the strength of the two formats...I'm glad we tried something, but I don't think it speaks to what our audience wants or what the core elements of Amazing Race are.

== Release ==
=== Broadcast ===
On February 20, 2025, CBS announced that the season would air in the 2025–26 television season. The season was revealed to be airing in the fall in posts from the show's social media accounts on March 18, 2025, during the start of filming. This timeframe was reiterated by CBS at upfronts on May 7, 2025, with the season set to air on Wednesday nights after Survivor 49. On July 11, 2025, CBS announced that the season would premiere on September 25, 2025, after an eviction episode for Big Brother 27 before moving to its regular time slot after Survivor on the following week.

=== Ratings ===
Viewership and ratings per episode of The Amazing Race 38
No.	Title	Air date	Rating (18–49)	Viewers (millions)	DVR (18–49)	DVR viewers (millions)	Total (18–49)	Total viewers (millions)	Ref.
1	"Two Worlds Colliding"	September 25, 2025	0.2	2.03	0.2	1.56	0.4	3.59	
2	"Mom's Gonna Have the Willies"	October 1, 2025	0.3	2.27	0.2	1.49	0.5	3.76	
3	"Cry and Rally"	October 8, 2025	0.3	2.34	0.2	1.48	0.5	3.82	
4	"What Would Houdini Do?"	October 15, 2025	0.3	2.39	0.2	1.41	0.5	3.81	
5	"I Wanna Be a Little Angry Right Now"	October 22, 2025	0.3	2.31	0.2	1.45	0.5	3.76	
6	"The System Hacked Me"	October 29, 2025	0.3	2.46	0.2	1.38	0.5	3.84	
7	"It Feels Like Falling the Whole Time"	November 5, 2025	0.2	2.37	0.2	1.38	0.4	3.75	
8	"Oh Egg, Where Art Thou"	November 12, 2025	0.2	2.30	TBD	TBD	TBD	TBD	
9	"I'm Not a Big Fan of Olives"	November 19, 2025	0.3	2.35	TBD	TBD	TBD	TBD	
10	"It's Hard Not to Feel Hopeless"	November 26, 2025	0.3	2.56	TBD	TBD	TBD	TBD	
11	"The Can't Can't"	December 3, 2025	0.3	2.61	TBD	TBD	TBD	TBD	
12	"One Million Cookies"	December 10, 2025	0.4	2.81	TBD	TBD	TBD	TBD	

== Works cited ==
- Castro, Adam-Troy (2006). My Ox Is Broken!. BenBella Books. ISBN 978-1-932100-91-4.
