= Jag Bains =

American television personality (born 1998)

- Born: Jagateshwar Bains; February 14, 1998 (age 28); Omak, Washington, U.S.
- Education: University of Washington
- Occupation: Television personality
- Television: Big Brother 25 (winner); The Amazing Race 38 (winner)
- Height: 5 ft 9 in (1.75 m)

Jagateshwar "Jag" Bains (born February 14, 1998) is an American reality television personality. He is the winner of the 25th season of the American reality television series Big Brother, becoming the first Sikh-Punjabi to win the series. He is the first Big Brother winner to also win The Amazing Race.

== Big Brother ==
CBS announced Bains as a Big Brother 25 HouseGuest on July 31, 2023. Initially, Bains struggled to gain traction in the game and was actually evicted in Week 4 by a unanimous vote. However, his closest ally, Matt Klotz, used the Power of Invincibility to save him and give him a second chance in the game.

Bains was awarded the $750,000 grand prize by the season's jury, winning by a vote of 5–2 over Matt Klotz, and he became the first Sikh-Punjabi player to win Big Brother. He was also the first HouseGuest to win after previously being evicted from the house.

Bains appeared on a special episode of Big Brother 26 alongside fellow winners Cody Calafiore (from seasons 16 and 22) and Taylor Hale (from season 24) to look back on the first three weeks of the season and reveal the next twist. He made also a guest appearance on Big Brother: Unlocked in a segment called "Get Jaggy with It".

== The Amazing Race ==
In 2025, Bains competed on The Amazing Race 38 partnered with his brother, Jas Bains. The pair won the race in the season finale.

== Filmography ==
=== Television ===
Key
†	Denotes television productions that have not yet been released

Year	Title	Role	Notes
2023	Big Brother 25	Contestant	Winner (42 episodes)
2024	Big Brother 26	Guest	(2 episodes)
2025	Big Brother: Unlocked	Guest	Companion show with Big Brother 27 (1 episode)
2025	The Amazing Race 38	Contestant	Winner (12 episodes)
2027	The Traitors †	Contestant	Season 6

Preceded by Taylor Hale	Winner of Big Brother; Season 25	Succeeded by Nicole Franzel (RG); Chelsie Baham (26)
