= Salina EsTitties =

American drag performer

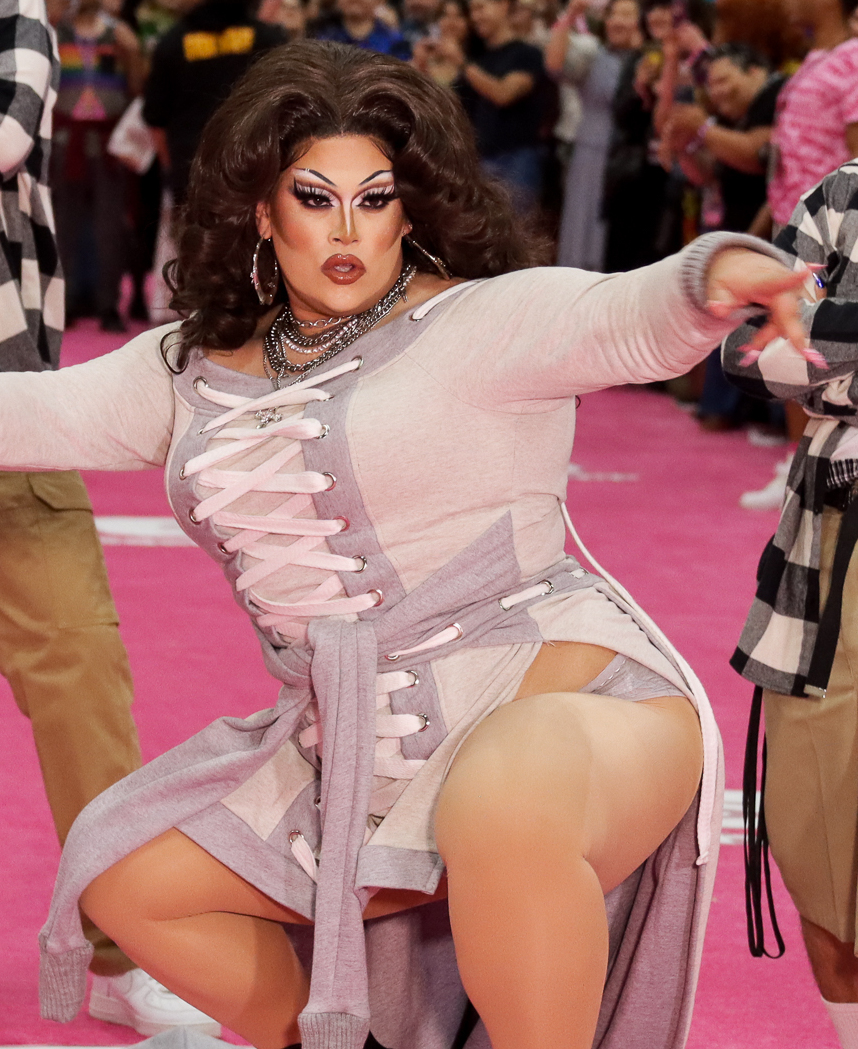
- Salina EsTitties at RuPaul's DragCon LA, 2023
- Born: Jason De Puy; October 8, 1990 (age 36); San Francisco Bay Area, California, U.S.
- Occupation: Drag queen
- Years active: 2015–present
- Television: RuPaul's Drag Race (season 15); RuPaul's Drag Race All Stars (season 11); Big Brother (season 28)
- Website: estitties.com

Jason De Puy (born October 8, 1990), better known by his stage name Salina EsTitties, is an American drag queen who competed on the fifteenth season of RuPaul's Drag Race and the eleventh season of RuPaul's Drag Race All Stars. De Puy also competed as a HouseGuest on season 28 of Big Brother, finishing in 15th place.

== Early life and education ==
De Puy was born and raised in the San Francisco Bay Area. His mother, who immigrated to the United States from Mexico when she was 17, is of Honduran descent. De Puy is also of Nicaraguan and Panamanian descent.

De Puy had a socially progressive upbringing. His parents worked full-time and often left him in the care of his gay uncles in the Castro District, a historic gay neighbourhood in San Francisco. His older brother is also gay. His family was supportive when De Puy came out.

After graduating from high school, De Puy moved to West Hollywood, California to study musical theatre and earned a Bachelor of Fine Arts degree. Although he aspired to perform on broadway, financial constraints prevented De Puy from moving to New York. He briefly struggled with substance abuse issues, and became homeless at one point. At 21, he started attending Alcoholic Anonymous (AA) and has been sober since.

== Career ==
EsTitties has quit drag multiple times due to how expensive the profession is. Her drag name is inspired by Selena. In West Hollywood, Salina EsTitties has performed at The Abbey and Micky's. She is also a musician. She's appeared in #NoFilter, Vida, Dance Moms, and AJ and the Queen. In 2018, she performed in the ensemble of the Los Angeles production of Priscilla, Queen of the Desert.

=== RuPaul's Drag Race ===
Salina EsTitties competed on the fifteenth season of RuPaul's Drag Race, placing in the bottom two four times before being eliminated in the episode "Wigloose: The Rusical". Her four lip-sync battles were against Amethyst, Spice, Malaysia Babydoll Foxx, and Loosey LaDuca. Loosey LaDuca eliminated Salina EsTitties to Kate Bush's "Running Up That Hill".

Screen Rant included Salina EsTitties in a list of 15 "queens who made amazing first impressions" on Drag Race and said she "has a loud voice, a spicy personality, and a unique point of view that stands out" among her fellow contestants. Michelle Alonzo wrote, "Salina's talent show lipsync was not only fun to watch but showed her potential. With a catchy song and a perfect reference to Will Smith's infamous Oscars slap, Salina's high energy and strong effort paid off and quickly landed her at the top." For the Snatch Game challenge, Salina EsTitties portrayed the Mary, mother of Jesus. The story Salina EsTitties told during the stand-up comedy challenge on episode 11 was inspired by a real life experience at Raven-Symoné's birthday party in 2015.

Bob the Drag Queen paid tribute to Salina EsTitties following her elimination. Sam Demshenas of Gay Times said Salina EsTitties "continuously tore up the stage in her lip-sync smackdowns" and "became one of the most memorable confessional queens in the show's herstory and provided visibility for Latina women across the world".

==== Runway looks ====
Smash Cut Reviews referred to Salina EsTitties's first runway outfit as "deconstructed West Coast Latina getup", and praised her ability to give an elevated shoutout to her culture. For the "Metallica"-themed runway, Salina EsTitties wore a Los Angeles lamppost costume, suggesting she's "a girl from the streets"; the outfit later earned her a Golden Boot Award for the season's worst look. In the ‘House of Fashion’ episode, where contestants have to make their own garments, her outfit was criticized by Ross Mathews as being too busy and by Michelle Visage as not fitting well. Reflecting on the "Money Ball", The A.V. Club called Salina EsTitties's choice to include food stamps in her outfit as fresh and inspired, while criticizing the look's overall execution.

For the "Night of 1,000 Beyoncés" runway category, she recreated Beyoncé's red-carpet look from the 46th Annual Grammy Awards (2004). When the runway category was "Rip Her to Shreds", Vulture commented, "Salina gives a touching tribute to her mother, portraying an immigrant crossing the border, but the unfortunate truth is that the drag is not up to the level of the story." For the "Everybody Say Glove" runway, Autostraddle praised the clear vision of the look, despite it not being their favorite. In the finale episode, Salina EsTitties appeared in "an exuberant cake dress with the ass taken out".

After the show aired, Salina EsTitties spoke about not feeling celebrated on Drag Race, particularly for representing her Latina and West Coast background on the runway. In a video that went viral, she took issue with judge Ross Mathews' critiques of her runway looks.

=== RuPaul's Drag Race All Stars ===
In April 2026, EsTitties was announced as a contestant on RuPaul’s Drag Race All Stars season 11. As part of the second bracket, she competed against Crystal Methyd, Silky Nutmeg Ganache, Aura Mayari, April Carrión, and Vivacious. She was eliminated in episode six.

=== Big Brother 28 ===
In July 2026, De Puy was announced as a houseguest on Season 28 of Big Brother US. He was evicted on Day 24 by a 12-0 vote, finishing in 15th place. De Puy was among the alumni seated in the audience for the 1000th episode. EsTitties officially made an appearance in drag during the finale episode.

Prior to his appearance on Season 28, De Puy had previously unsuccessfully auditioned thrice for the show. In July 2024, EsTitties entered the Big Brother house for eight hours in drag as one of 9 players in the 2024 Media Day promotional season for Season 26. She was an initial nominee, but survived eviction by a 1-5 vote.

In August 2026, De Puy also appeared in the 20 player ChatBCC (now Ramble) promotional season for the Big Brother 1000th episode special called the Big Brother Battle Royale, where he was co-runners-up with Felicia Cannon, both of whom received 3 jury votes to the winner Jimmy Heagerty's 6 jury votes. Had he won, De Puy would have donated the $10,000 prize to The Trevor Project.

EsTitties has made drag impressions of her fellow houseguests, namely as Mallory Aurichio, Melody Morris, Angela Murray, Yash Patel, LaTrice Verrett, the Survivor alumni Dee Valladares and Rick Devens, Kamu Kirk, and Haley Thogmartin. In September 2026, at Big Sister, a Big Brother themed drag show co-hosted with Season 12 winner Rachel Reilly and fellow drag queen Amanda Tori Meating, EsTitties performed as ZingBootz, a drag impression of Zingbot.

== Personal life ==
De Puy lives in Los Angeles, California.

=== Political views and activism ===
In February 2020, De Puy was a panellist for a West Hollywood City Council town hall on the prevalence and impact of “chemsex” within the LGBTQ+ community. Sharing his experience, De Puy, who was eight years sober at the time, explained that his substance abuse issues stemmed from a lack of queer-friendly sex education and the resulting shame he felt as a young gay man. According to him, he found intimacy to be "easier and euphoric" after being introduced to methamphetamine, however, the addiction quickly “took over his life.” De Puy also spoke against the normalization of drug use on social media.

In a 2023 interview with Entertainment Weekly, Frankie Grande credited De Puy for his sobriety. They first met when Grande was the guest judge at a local drag show, and later ran into each other at an AA meeting. Grande then appeared as a guest on season 15 of RuPaul’s Drag Race with De Puy.

In 2025, GLAAD launched an initiative called Weather Watch with EsTitties aimed at educating about the pro- and anti-LGBTQ legislation in the United States.

== Filmography ==
=== Reality competition ===
Year	Title	Role	Notes	Result
2023	RuPaul's Drag Race	Contestant	Season 15 (14 episodes)	6th Place
2026	RuPaul's Drag Race All Stars	Contestant	Season 11 (3 episodes)	9th Place
2026	Big Brother	Contestant	Season 28	15th Place

=== Reality competition promotional seasons ===
Year	Title	Role	Notes	Ref.
2024	Big Brother 2024 Media Day	Herself	Nominated by HOH; survived eviction vote	
2026	Big Brother Battle Royale	Himself (Jason)	Co-runner-up	

=== Television ===
Year	Title	Role	Notes
2026	Drag House Rules	Herself	4 episodes
2026	I'm Dead	Herself	3 episodes
2026	Big Brother: Unlocked	Himself (Jason)	Guest Panelist, 1 episode

=== Film ===
Year	Title	Role	Notes
2018	Dido's Lament	Herself	Short film
2020	1 Night in San Diego	Drag queen	
TBA	Miles Away †	Laurél	

=== Music video appearances ===
Title	Year	Director	Notes	Ref.
"SLAY" (Nia Sioux, ft. Coco Jones)	2015	Mikey Minden	Uncredited; background dancer	
"Bring It On Tribute" (Remix) (Honey Davenport)	2023	Brad Hammer, Anthony Auguste	As a cheerleader	
"God Save the Queens" (Vienna Vienna)	2025	Jay St. James	Starring as herself	
"Rhythm of Love" (Frankie Grande)	2025	Frankie Grande, Austin Nunes	As a drag queen	
"I Drove All Night" (Cover) (Frankie Grande)	2026	Phillip Henry	Co-special feature with Layton Williams	

=== Podcasts ===
Year	Podcast	Host(s)	Episode	Role	Notes
2022	Möther's Creme Diaries	Christina Kuehl	Episode 2: "Rest in Bussy"	Vivian	Fiction podcast
2023	Give It To Me Straight	Maddy Morphosis	Episode 8: "SALINA ESTITTIES"	Herself	
2023	Sibling Rivalry	Monét X Change	Episode: "The One with Salina EsTitties"	Herself	
2024	Sibling Rivalry	Monét X Change	Episode: "The One About Survivor"	Herself	
2024	Hall & Closet	Jaida Essence Hall and Heidi N Closet	Episode: "Pushing Through (w/ Salina EsTitties)"	Herself	
2024–25	Homegirl Hotline	Herself	15 episodes	Herself	
2025	Sibling Rivalry	Bob the Drag Queen	Episode: "Sibling Watchery: RuPaul's Drag Race S17E14 "How's Your Headliner?""	Herself	
2026	Sibling Rivalry	Monét X Change	Episode: "The One Where We Try To Be Clean"	Herself	
2026	Very Delta	Delta Work	Episode 95: "Do You Love Cool Ranch Doritos Like Me?"	Herself	
2026	The Kelly Mantle Show	Kelly Mantle	Episode: "Salina EsTitties Spills Drag Race All Stars Tea"	Herself	
2026	Rob Has a Podcast	Rob Cesternino and Taran Armstrong	Episode: "Jason De Puy - Exit Interview: BB28 Week 3"	Himself (Jason)	
2026	The Exclusive with Sharon Tharp	Sharon Tharp	Episode: "Big Brother 28 Exit Interview: Jason De Puy Talks Tea Party & His Secret Plan for Salina EsTitties"	Himself (Jason)	
2026	GLAAD: Celebrity Interviews with Anthony Allen Ramos	Anthony Allen Ramos	Episode: ""Big Brother's" Jason De Puy on Isolation, Identity, and Why Authenticity Matters Most"	Himself (Jason)	
2026	Off the Vine with Kaitlyn Bristowe	Kaitlyn Bristowe	Episode: "Jason De Puy Inside Big Brother: Live Feed Secrets & Tea Party Drama"	Himself (Jason)	
2026	The Secret Alliance Podcast	Jason Guy, Hannah Chaddha, and Rachel Reilly	Episode: "Ashley, Rome & Jason Unfiltered: The Real Reasons They Were Evicted"	Himself (Jason)	
2026	Heavy Crown Network: OUT House	Jimmy Heagerty, Derek Frazier, Hisam Goueli, and Tommy Bracco	Season 2; Episode 40: "Jason De Puy Spills the Teapot"	Himself (Jason)	
2026	God 101	Julie Chen Moonves	Episode: "1 on 1: God 101 Jason from Big Brother 28"	Himself (Jason)	

=== Web series ===
Year	Series	Role	Notes	Ref.
2016	Go-Go Boy Interrupted	Jason De Puy as Salina EsTitties	1 episode (Season 2: Episode 2); credited as "Jason DePuy"	
2018	Yas Kween	Herself	Main cast (5 episodes)	
2023	Amigas y Amores	Herself	Also writer (9 episodes)	
2023	Drag Queen Storytime by Lush Cosmetics	Herself	Guest host (1 episode)	
2026	High High School Musical	Ms. Darbus	"Drunk" musical series	
2026	High School Musical 2 High	Ms. Darbus	"Drunk" musical series	

== Discography ==
=== Music videos ===
Title	Year	Director	Notes	Ref.
"STFU Karen"	2020	Assaad Yacoub	Single	
"Cancel Xmas" (Salina EsTitties & Blakr)	2020	Herself	Single	
"Xmas On"	2020	Herself	Single	
"BOOTZ"	2024	Assaad Yacoub	Released as part of the HOMEGIRL debut EP	
"PAPÍ"	2024	Brad Hammer	Released as part of the HOMEGIRL debut EP	
"Melt the Ice"	2025	Herself	Single	
"The RuPaul and I"	2026	Herself	Parody of The Wizard and I; song written prior to appearance on RuPaul's Drag Race season 15	
"Pek Pek"	2026	Herself	Single	

=== Non-video music releases ===
Title	Year	EP/Album	Notes	Ref.
"Find Yo Light"	2023	Single	Rap; performed for guest judge Ariana Grande on RuPaul's Drag Race season 15 Episode 1	
"ELLA / HOMEGIRL"	2024	HOMEGIRL	Released jointly as an EP; lyric meanings explained in an InGenius EsVerified series	
"CALIGENTÉ"	2024	HOMEGIRL	Released jointly as an EP; lyric meanings explained in an InGenius EsVerified series	
"Homegirl Hotline"	2024	Single	Released as the theme song for a 15 episode podcast of the same name	
"ELOTERIA"	2024	Single	50 second rap track	
"My Guy" (Frankie Grande ft. Salina EsTitties)	2025	Hotel Rock Bottom	Special feature; in deluxe edition	
"Dreamin' of Me" (Salina EsTitties & April Carrión)	2026	Single	Performed as part of RuPaul's Drag Race All Stars season 11	

== See also ==
- List of people from Los Angeles
