= Big Brother: Unlocked =

Coordinates: 34°8′40.12″N 118°23′20.71″W

- Also known as: Unlocked
- Genre: Reality; Talk show; Aftershow
- Presented by: Taylor Hale; Derrick Levasseur; Jerry O'Connell; Chelsie Baham
- Country of origin: United States
- Original language: English
- No. of seasons: 2
- No. of episodes: 11

Production
- Executive producer: Allison Grodner
- Running time: 43 minutes
- Production companies: Fly on the Wall Entertainment; Banijay Americas

Original release
- Network: CBS
- Release: July 25, 2025 – present

Related
- Big Brother (American TV series)

Big Brother: Unlocked (often shortened to just Unlocked) is a reality aftershow and spin-off of Big Brother hosted by Taylor Hale and Derrick Levasseur who were both previous winners of Big Brother. The show premiered on CBS on July 25, 2025.

== Format ==
Each episode generally consists of the following format in order:

1. Big Move/Bad Move: The panel discuss the biggest moves and worst moves from the recent episodes of Big Brother.
2. Fantasy BB: A fantasy draft game check in with three previous Big Brother winners, Hale, Levasseur and Chelsie Baham from season 26.
3. BB Breaking News/Cutting Room Floor/The Rant Room: An exclusive highlight from an event or diary room that has not seen been yet from the Big Brother house.
4. The H.O.T List and N.O.T List: The panel disscuss the Houseguests who are currently on top and the ones who are on the bottom.

Previous Houseguests segments:

1. Wine or Whine: Nicole Franzel from seasons 16, 18, 22, and Reindeer Games returns to discuss her favorite and least favorite moments from the season.
2. Getting Jaggy with It: Jag Bains from season 25 returns to discuss how to be an entertaining Houseguest on Big Brother.
3. Shirtless Sherlock: Jessie Godderz from seasons 10 and 11 returns to discuss pec-uliar behavior in the Big Brother house.
4. BBies: Baham, Britney Haynes from seasons 12 14 and Reindeer Games and Zingbot return to award the Big Brother cast with the BBies.

== Series overview ==
Season	Episodes	Originally released		
Season	Episodes	First released	Last released	Network
1	5	July 25, 2025	September 19, 2025	CBS
2	6	July 10, 2026	September 18, 2026	CBS

== Episodes ==
=== Season 1 ===
No. overall	No. in season	Title	Original release date	Guest(s)	US viewers (millions)	Rating (18–49)
1	1	"Big Brother: Unlocked 7/25/25"	July 25, 2025	Bobby Moynihan, Chelsie Baham, Matthew Berry, Nicole Franzel and Amy Bingham.	1.53	0.2
In Big Brother: Unlocked, former Big Brother winners Derrick Levasseur (from season 16) and Taylor Hale (from season 24) were joined by mystery celebrity guests and surprise Big Brother alumni to recap and revisit the first two weeks of the Big Brother 27. Some segments include, "Big Move/Bad Move", "BB Fantasy Draft", "Binge Worthy or Cringe Worthy" and "Wine or Whine".
2	2	"Big Brother: Unlocked 8/8/25"	August 8, 2025	Jerry O'Connell, Chelsie Baham, Jag Bains, family of Rachel Reilly, Brendon Villegas, The Mastermind and Jimmy Heagerty.	1.44	0.2
Levasseur and Hale return to recap and revisit the last two weeks of Big Brother 27. Some segments include, "Big Move/Bad Move", "Terrible Take", "The Rant Room", "Cutting Room Floor" and "Getting Jaggy with It".
3	3	"Big Brother: Unlocked 8/24/25" (Note: This episode was an embedded installment of Big Brother that was originally scheduled to air independently on August 22.)	August 24, 2025	Rob Mariano, family of Will Williams, Nicole Franzel, Gavin Smith and Jerry O'Connell.	3.20	0.7
Levasseur and Hale return to recap and revisit the last few weeks of Big Brother 27. Some segments include, "Big Move/Bad Move", "BB Breaking News", "The Rant Room", "Wine or Whine" and "Terrible Take".
4	4	"Big Brother: Unlocked 9/5/25"	September 5, 2025	Lance Bass, Chelsie Baham, family of Ava Pearl, Jessie Godderz, Nancy Fisher, Mickey Lee and Tyler Crispen.	1.71	0.2
Levasseur and Hale return to recap and revisit the last two weeks of Big Brother 27. Some segments include, "BB Breaking News", "Big Move/Bad Move", "BB Fantasy Draft", "Pec-culiar Behavior", "The Rant Room" and "Cutting Room Floor".
5	5	"Big Brother: Unlocked 9/19/25"	September 19, 2025	James Gunn, Britney Haynes, Zingbot, Chelsie Baham, Rachel Reilly and Will Williams.	1.57	0.2
For the final time this season, Levasseur and Hale return to recap and revisit season 27 as a whole. Some segments include, "BB Breaking News", "Big Move/Bad Move", "The BBies", "BB Fantasy Draft", "The Rant Room" and "Cutting Room Floor".

=== Season 2 ===
No. overall	No. in season	Title	Original release date	Guest(s)	U.S. viewers (millions)	Rating (18–49)
6	1	"Big Brother: Unlocked 7/10/26"	July 10, 2026	Rachel Reilly	2.35	0.4
The episode opened with Survivor 45 winner Dee Valladares entered the game. Former Big Brother winners Derrick Levasseur from 16 and Taylor Hale from season 24, along with Jerry O'Connell, were joined by Rachel Reilly to recap and revisit the first night of Big Brother 28. Featured segments included "Missing Moments", "Cirie's Survival Tips", and "Something Surprising". The episode concluded with Angela, Dee, and Devens competing to become the season's first Head of Household.
7	2	"Big Brother: Unlocked 7/24/26"	July 24, 2026	Ross Matthews, Rome Seymour	1.74	0.2
The episode opened with the fallout of the second eviction. Former Big Brother winners Derrick Levasseur from big brother season 16 and Taylor Hale, from big brother season 24 along with Jerry O'Connell, were joined by Ross Matthews the runnerup from celebrity big brother season 1 to recap and revisit the first two weeks of Big Brother 28. They were also joined by the recent evictee, Rome Seymour. Featured segments included "Missing Moments", "BB Bad Ass/Dumb Ass", "The Rant Room", "Creator Corner" and "Something Surprising". O'Connell entered the BB Time Capsule and revealed the powers and punishments that are up for grabs. The episode concluded with the HouseGuests beginning the third Head of Household competition, "Wrestlegasm".
8	3	"Big Brother: Unlocked 8/07/26"	August 7, 2026	Josh Martinez, Jason De Puy, Lyric Medeiros	1.77	0.2
The episode opened with the fallout of the forth eviction. Former Big Brother winners Derrick Levasseur and Taylor Hale, along with Jerry O'Connell, were joined by another former winner, Josh Martinez, to recap and revisit the last two weeks of Big Brother 28. They were also joined by the two recent evictees, Jason De Puy and Lyric Medeiros. Featured segments included "Missing Moments", "BB Bad Ass/Dumb Ass", "The Rant Room" and "Creator Corner". O'Connell revealed that Mallory Aurichio had been voted to enter the "BB Time Capsule" next. The episode concluded with the HouseGuests beginning the fifth Head of Household competition, "Sasquatch Watch".
9	4	"Big Brother: Unlocked 8/23/26" (Note: This episode was an embedded installment of Big Brother.)	August 23, 2026	Danielle Reyes, Paul Abrahamian, Kamu Kirk	3.09	0.6
The episode opened with the fallout of the sixth eviction. Former Big Brother winners Derrick Levasseur and Taylor Hale, along with Jerry O'Connell, were joined by Big Brother runners-up Danielle Reyes and Paul Abrahamian to recap and revisit the last few weeks of Big Brother 28. They were also joined by the recent evictee, Kamu Kirk. Featured segments included "Missing Moments", "BB Bad Ass/Dumb Ass", "The Rant Room" and "Creator Corner".
10	5	"Big Brother: Unlocked 9/04/26"	September 4, 2026	Jay Mohr, Zingbot	N/A	TBA
The HouseGuests discuss La Trice's eviction and the BB Block Buster, while Barrett voices his disdain for not being able to vote out Devens this week. Former Big Brother winners Derrick Levasseur and Taylor Hale, along with Jerry O'Connell, are joined by Jay Mohr, to recap and revisit the last few weeks of the season. They are also joined by Zingbot. Featured segments included "Missing Moments", "BB Bad Ass/Dumb Ass", "Something Surprising", "The Rant Room" and "Creator Corner". The episode concluded with the HouseGuests beginning the ninth Head of Household competition, "Rainbow Rollers".
11	6	"Big Brother: Unlocked 9/18/26"	September 18, 2026	TBA	N/A	TBA

== Production ==
The logo of the first season of Big Brother: Unlocked

In July of 2025, CBS announced Big Brother: Unlocked. Airing bi-weekly on CBS, Unlocked is hosted by former Big Brother winners Taylor Hale and Derrick Levasseur along with a rotating guest. The show features gameplay analysis by the hosts as well as additional footage not included on the regular Big Brother broadcast.

=== Broadcast ===
The show aired on bi-weekly on Fridays, the day after live eviction episodes of Big Brother 27. Unlocked returned for Big Brother 28 with Jerry O'Connell joining previous hosts Hale and Levasseur. Additionally, CBS teased that they would launch a new interactive fan vote during these episodes and a live studio audience.
