= Big Brother 27 =

Big Brother 27 is the twenty-seventh season of various versions of television show Big Brother and may refer to:

- Big Brother 27, the 2025 edition of the U.S. version
- Big Brother Brasil 27, the 2027 edition of the Brazilian version
