= Big Brother 27 (American season) =

Big Brother
- Season 27
- Promotional poster for Big Brother 27
- Hosted by: Julie Chen Moonves
- No. of days: 83
- No. of houseguests: 17
- Winner: Ashley Hollis
- Runner-up: Vince Panaro
- America's Favorite HouseGuest: Keanu Soto
- Companion show: Big Brother: Unlocked
- No. of episodes: 39 (including Unlocked)

Release
- Original network: CBS
- Original release: July 10 – September 28, 2025

Additional information
- Filming dates: July 8 – September 28, 2025

Season chronology
- ← Previous; Season 26 Next → Season 28

Big Brother 27 is the twenty-seventh season of the American reality television program Big Brother. The program is an adaptation of the franchise created in 1999 by John de Mol Jr. The season features a murder mystery hotel theme. It premiered on CBS on July 10, 2025, with filming beginning two days prior and running for 83 days, concluding on September 28, 2025.

Ashley Hollis won the season, defeating Vince Panaro by a jury vote of 6–1. Keanu Soto was voted America's Favorite HouseGuest with over 65% of the vote.

== Format ==
Big Brother follows a group of contestants, known as HouseGuests, who live inside a custom-built house outfitted with cameras and microphones that record them at all times. The HouseGuests are sequestered with no contact with the outside world. During their stay, the HouseGuests share their thoughts on their day-to-day lives inside the house in a private room known as the Diary Room. Each week, the HouseGuests compete to win power and safety inside the house. At the start of each week, the HouseGuests compete in a Head of Household (HOH) competition. The winner of the HOH competition is immune from eviction and selects two (or, in certain seasons, three) HouseGuests to be nominated for eviction.

Six HouseGuests are then selected to compete in the Power of Veto (POV) competition: the reigning HOH, the nominees, and other players selected by random draw. The winner of the POV competition has the right to either revoke the nomination of one of the nominated HouseGuests or to leave them as-is. If the POV winner uses this power, the HOH must immediately nominate another HouseGuest, other than the POV winner, for eviction.

On eviction night, the three nominated HouseGuests compete in the BB Block Buster competition to immediately get removed off the block. The two remaining HouseGuests face the house vote for possible eviction.

All HouseGuests vote to evict one of the nominees, though the HOH and the nominees are not allowed to vote. This vote is conducted in the privacy of the Diary Room. The nominee with the most votes is evicted from the house. In the event of a tie, the HOH casts the tie-breaking vote. The last seven evicted HouseGuests comprise the jury and are sequestered in a separate location following their eviction. The jury is only allowed to see the competitions and ceremonies that include all of the remaining HouseGuests; they are not shown any interviews or other footage that might include strategy or details regarding nominations. When there are only two remaining HouseGuests, the jury will vote for the season's winner, who receives a grand prize of $750,000. The viewing public awards an additional prize by choosing "America's Favorite HouseGuest", with the award being worth $50,000. All evicted HouseGuests are eligible to win this award except for those who either voluntarily leave or are forcibly removed for rule violations.

== HouseGuests ==
The cast of the twenty-seventh season of Big Brother. Top: Zach, Adrian, Lauren, Zae, Rachel, Rylie, Katherine, Vince and Morgan Middle: Ava, Will, Ashley, Kelley, Mickey and Amy Bottom: Jimmy and Keanu

The initial cast of sixteen contestants was revealed on July 8, 2025. An additional seventeenth contestant was teased prior to the beginning of the season. During the premiere, this was revealed to be season 12 HouseGuest and season 13 winner Rachel Reilly.

Name	Age	Occupation	Residence	Result
Ashley Hollis	25	Attorney	New York City, New York	Winner; Day 83
Vince Panaro	34	Unemployed	West Hills, California	Runner-up; Day 83
Morgan Pope	33	Gamer	Los Angeles, California	Evicted; Day 83
Ava Pearl	24	Aura painter	Manhattan, New York	Evicted; Day 80
Keanu Soto	33	Dungeon Master	McKinney, Texas	Evicted; Day 77
Lauren Domingue	22	Bridal stylist	Lafayette, Louisiana	Evicted; Day 73
Kelley Jorgensen	29	Web designer	Burbank, South Dakota	Evicted; Day 73
Cliffton "Will" Williams	50	College sports podcaster	Charlotte, North Carolina	Evicted; Day 66
Rachel Reilly Big Brother 12 & Big Brother 13	40	TV personality	Hoover, Alabama	Eliminated; Day 60
Mickey Lee	35	Event curator	Atlanta, Georgia	Evicted; Day 59
Katherine Woodman	23	Fine dining server	Columbia, South Carolina	Evicted; Day 52
Rylie Jeffries	27	Professional bull rider	Luther, Oklahoma	Evicted; Day 45
Zach Cornell	27	Marketing manager	Cartersville, Georgia	Evicted; Day 38
Jimmy Heagerty	25	Strategy consultant	Washington, D.C.	Evicted; Day 31
Adrian Rocha	23	Carpenter	San Antonio, Texas	Evicted; Day 24
Amy Bingham (Note: Amy entered the house as the Mastermind's secret accomplice, and later became an official contestant after the house failed to identify the accomplice.)	43	Insurance agent	Stockton, California	Evicted; Day 17
Isaiah "Zae" Frederich	23	Salesperson	Provo, Utah	Evicted; Day 10

=== Future appearances ===
In 2026, Keanu Soto competed on The Challenge: Cutthroat. He also made an appearance in the 1,000th episode special of Big Brother and was later seen as part of the Medieval Big Brother twist. It was also revealed Keanu was the Mystery Competitor had that power been unleashed. Morgan Pope made a cameo appearance in Big Brother 28 to host the Week 4 Veto Competition. Vince Panaro made an appearance on Big Brother 28 to host the Week 11 Temptation competition.

== Episodes ==
No. overall	No. in season	Title	Day(s)	Timeslot (ET)	Original release date	U.S. viewers (millions)	Rating (18–49)
Week 1
937	1	"Episode 1"	Day 1	Thursday 8:00 p.m.	July 10, 2025	3.18	0.6
Sixteen new HouseGuests enter the house, but excitement turns to chaos when "The Mastermind" appears, kidnaps host Julie Chen Moonves, and steals the "HOH Relic". The HouseGuests are split into two groups of eight. One group—Adrian, Amy, Ava, Lauren, Mickey, Rylie, Vince, and Zach—must solve a massive bridge puzzle to access eight doors, each hiding a clue from Julie. Zach correctly chooses the door where Julie is held, winning $10,000. The other group—Ashley, Jimmy, Katherine, Keanu, Kelley, Morgan, Will, and Zae—searches through a room of fake relics to find the real one. Jimmy finds it and earns the power to choose four HouseGuests—himself, Adrian, Ashley, and Vince—to compete for Head of Household. In the HOH competition, they must balance six cores on their BB Blaster for 10 seconds. Vince succeeds and becomes the first HOH. After the HOH competition, the HouseGuests are surprised by the addition of former player Rachel Reilly from seasons 12 and 13 to the cast. Then, the Mastermind reveals that one HouseGuest is secretly their Accomplice. If the others correctly identify the Accomplice, the Accomplice will be evicted immediately; if they guess wrong, the Accomplice officially enters the game.
938	2	"Episode 2"	Days 1–4	Sunday 8:00 p.m.	July 13, 2025	2.73	0.5
After some discussion, the HouseGuests—except for the Accomplice—secretly vote on who they believe the Accomplice is. Rylie receives 11 votes, while the remaining 5 go to Zae. However, the Mastermind informs them that they are incorrect. A flashback and confessional reveals to the audience that Amy is the Accomplice. In the Diary Room, Zach learns that, until the jury begins, he can use his $10,000 prize to purchase one-time immunity if he is nominated for eviction following a veto meeting. As a late arrival to the game, Rachel is granted immunity from the first eviction, though she must live as a have-not. Three other HouseGuests earn immunity through a Chain of Safety: Rachel grants safety to Will, who then chooses Zach, who completes the chain by choosing Ava. On Day 4, Vince nominates Amy, Ashley, and Zae for eviction.
939	3	"Episode 3"	Days 4–7	Wednesday 8:00 p.m.	July 16, 2025	3.01	0.6
Following the nomination ceremony and the fallout from "Showergate," Ashley tearfully confronts Vince in the HoH room, feeling deeply hurt by his decision to nominate her. Meanwhile, Zae remains calm and ready to compete in the upcoming Veto competition. Rachel and Zach are selected to join Amy, Ashley, Vince, and Zae in the "Campsite Caper" Veto competition. For this competition, participants had to inspect three crime scenes by matching shoeprints, tire tracks, and scents, then correctly identify each perpetrator. Ashley won the Golden Power of Veto. Shortly after, a new alliance—the "Heavy Hitters," made up of Jimmy, Morgan, Rachel, Rylie, Vince, and Zach—is quietly formed. On Day 7, Ashley uses the Power of Veto to remove herself from the block, prompting Vince to nominate Kelley as her replacement. Tensions escalate afterward when Jimmy calls out Keanu in front of the house, dramatically labeling him "the true snake."
940	4	"Episode 4"	Days 7–10	Thursday 8:00 p.m.	July 17, 2025	3.17	0.7
Immediately after the Veto Ceremony, Keanu approaches Jimmy to clear the air, and the two agree not to target each other moving forward. Meanwhile, Zae grows increasingly concerned about being this week’s target and forms a new alliance—the "Burger Boys," made up of himself, Rylie, Vince, Will, and Zach. Elsewhere in the house, Kelley begins to regret her decision to go up as a pawn. Rachel, meanwhile, starts campaigning for Zae to be evicted if he remains on the block after the upcoming BB Block Buster competition. When Zae hears about her plan, he publicly confronts her. Their heated and awkward exchange makes it clear to the entire house that they’re targeting one another. In the BB Block Buster competition, "Ransom Note," the nominees need to unscramble word clues to identify the item they need to steal. Kelley secures the win, leaving Amy and Zae as the final nominees for the week. On Day 10, Zae is evicted from the Big Brother house by a vote of 9–5.
Week 2
941	5	"Episode 5"	Days 10–11	Sunday 8:00 p.m.	July 20, 2025	3.06	0.6
Following Zae’s eviction, tensions escalate as Adrian, Keanu, Will, and Zach express frustration over being on the wrong side of the vote. Keanu becomes suspicious of Will, suspecting he may have flipped to evict Zae over Amy. Meanwhile, Rachel is thrilled to learn that Rylie, going against the Burger Boys, sided with the women to save Amy. Chaos strikes the house when the “Mastermind” breaks into "Hotel Mystère", stealing three powerful game advantages and the HoH key from the safe. In the "BB Break-In" competition, HouseGuests must navigate pitch-black sewers to recover the stolen items. Jimmy finds the missing HoH key, becoming the new Head of Household. Keanu earns the "Mystery Competitor" power, allowing a former HouseGuest to compete in the veto on his behalf. Kelley secures the "Mystery Veto," granting her a chance to compete in a private veto challenge after the standard one. Mickey wins the "HoH Interrogation" power, giving her the ability to anonymously dethrone the HoH—unless correctly identified during a formal interrogation. On Day 11, Jimmy nominates Adrian, Keanu, and Kelley for eviction.
942	6	"Episode 6"	Days 8, 11–14	Wednesday 8:00 p.m.	July 23, 2025	2.93	0.6
Sometime after the nomination ceremony, several HouseGuests express their hopes that either Keanu or Kelley will be evicted this week. At the Veto draw, Keanu activates his "Mystery Competitor" power, altering the standard competition rules. Only one HouseGuest is drawn to play: Ava. Keanu continues to irritate others with his communication style, further isolating himself. During the Veto Competition, former Big Brother 20 winner Kaycee Clark enters the house to compete on Keanu’s behalf. The "Caught Creeping" competition, requires players to hold two buttons on a wall until they hear the code word "Creeper" — announced by Big Brother 25's Felicia Cannon. Once the word is heard, players race down a lane to press their buzzer, with one HouseGuest eliminated each round. Kaycee secures the Power of Veto, handing it over to Keanu, who then removes himself from the block. In his place, Jimmy nominates Amy. Kelley activates her "Mystery Veto" power, giving her the opportunity to compete in a solo challenge called "The Case of the Mystery Veto". She successfully solves the puzzle, allowing her to remove herself from the block as well. Forced to name a new nominee, Jimmy selects Will.
943	7	"Episode 7"	Days 14–17	Thursday 8:00 p.m.	July 24, 2025	3.00	0.5
After making five nominations this week, Jimmy draws criticism from Mickey and Morgan for not collaborating with them—especially over his decision to nominate Will. Most HouseGuests view Jimmy’s nominations as safe gameplay. Meanwhile, Katherine and Lauren rally to evict Amy, feeling more secure aligning with the men in the house. Rachel, however, pushes for Adrian’s or Will's eviction, seeing them as a stronger threat. In the BB Block Buster competition, "Puzzling Prints," HouseGuests race to complete a 12-piece puzzle. Adrian secures the win and removes himself from the block. On Day 17, Amy is evicted from the Big Brother house by a unanimous 13–0 vote. Note: Taylor Hale the winner of big brother season 24 and the runner up of big brother Reindeer Games and Derrick Levasseur the winner of big brother season 16 join Julie Chen Moonves on stage to discuss the special bi-weekly Friday episodes of Big Brother: Unlocked.
Week 3
944	8	"Big Brother: Unlocked 7/25/25"	N/A (Note: This episode showcased events from the previous days in the season. No new or present days were featured.)	Friday 8:00 p.m.	July 25, 2025	1.53	0.2
In Big Brother: Unlocked, former Big Brother winners Derrick Levasseur (from season 16) and Taylor Hale (from season 24) were joined by mystery celebrity guests and surprise Big Brother alumni to recap and revisit the first two weeks of the season. Some segments include, "Big Move/Bad Move", "BB Fantasy Draft", "Binge Worthy or Cringe Worthy" and "Wine or Whine". Note: Special guests include Chelsie Baham, winner of Big Brother 26, fantasy sports analyst Matthew Berry, former SNL cast member Bobby Moynihan, Nicole Franzel, winner of Big Brother 18 and recent evictee Amy Bingham.
945	9	"Episode 9"	Days 9, 16–18	Sunday 8:00 p.m.	July 27, 2025	3.04	0.5
After Amy's eviction, Rachel is feeling at her lowest point in the house, while Jimmy hopes to regain favor with his allies following his controversial Head of Household reign. In the “Twin Witness News” Head of Household competition, HouseGuests must correctly answer a series of true-or-false questions based on events witnessed by former Big Brother 17 HouseGuests, Julia and Liz Nolan. Lauren emerges victorious, becoming the new Head of Household. Meanwhile, Mickey and Morgan are unsure where Lauren stands in the game and consider whether Mickey should use her secret power to steal Lauren’s HoH reign. Vince congratulates Lauren on her win and attempts to gauge her thoughts on nominations. Lauren considers nominating Keanu, a frequent house target, and just needs two easy nominees to sit beside him on the block. Kelley once again volunteers to go up, leaving Lauren to choose one more. She debates between Adrian, Ashley, and Will—each of whom has already faced the block this season. On Day 18, Lauren officially nominates Keanu, Kelley, and Will for eviction.
946	10	"Episode 10"	Days 16–21	Wednesday 8:00 p.m.	July 30, 2025	3.02	0.6
After becoming the third nominee, Will is frustrated that Lauren has put him back on the block, especially with so many HouseGuests still in the game. At the veto draw, Vince and Ashley are selected to compete alongside Lauren and the three nominees. In the "Basement Break In" Power of Veto competition, players must retrieve a crystal through a laser maze in the shortest amount of time. Keanu clockes the fastest run, securing the Power of Veto and a prescreening of The Bad Guys 2. Hoping to rebuild trust and remake allies, he invites Ava, Jimmy, and Rachel to watch the movie with him. Meanwhile, both Ashley and Adrian grows anxious about becoming potential replacement nominees. Vince lobbies for Ashley to go up, suspecting she is targeting him. However, Rachel sees Vince as Lauren’s closest ally and cautions Lauren not to let anyone, especially Vince, take control of her Head of Household reign. Meanwhile, the girls in the house begin campaigning to save Ashley, shifting momentum toward nominating Adrian instead. At the Veto Ceremony, Keanu uses the Power of Veto on himself. Lauren names Adrian as the replacement nominee.
947	11	"Episode 11"	Days 21–24	Thursday 8:00 p.m.	July 31, 2025	2.96	0.6
With the final nominees set, Adrian, Kelley, and Will rally to secure the seven votes needed to stay in the game. Meanwhile, Morgan realizes she’s caught between two opposing final threes—Vince and Zach, and Jimmy and Mickey—and begins to question her relationship with Mickey. Vince and Zach would prefer to see Will evicted this week, while Jimmy and Mickey are pushing for either Adrian or Kelley to go. In the "Study the Study" BB Block Buster, HouseGuests have one and a half minutes to identify the correct number of differences between two nearly identical rooms. Kelley guesses the closest and wins safety from eviction. On Day 24, Adrian is evicted from the Big Brother house by a vote of 8–4, with Zach and Vince voting against him to avoid upsetting the other side of the house.
Week 4
948	12	"Episode 12"	Days 2, 24–25	Sunday 8:00 p.m.	August 3, 2025	3.18	0.6
Before the eviction, Ava pulls Vince and Zach into the storage room, urging them to vote to keep Will, warning that the votes aren’t there otherwise. Not wanting to force a tie for Lauren, they change their votes and evict Adrian. In the three-round “Killer Carnival” Head of Household competition, HouseGuests begin in teams of four. Kelley automatically advances to round two after not being selected for a team. Each team selects one member to walk across a track of balance beams and press four buttons in the fastest time. Keanu wins round one, eliminating Ashley, Mickey, Morgan, and Will. In round two, new teams of three compete in a relay race to press all four buttons as quickly as possible. Jimmy, Rylie, and Zach advance to the final round. Now competing individually, HouseGuests must once again cross the balance beam track and hit all four buttons in the fastest time. Rylie wins, becoming the new Head of Household. Back inside, Rylie plans to nominate Ashley, Mickey, and Morgan as his initial nominees. Sensing danger, Mickey activates her "HoH Interrogation" power. Rylie incorrectly guesses that Ashley holds the power, allowing Mickey to overthrow his HoH reign.
949	13	"Episode 13"	Days 21, 25–28	Wednesday 8:00 p.m.	August 6, 2025	3.01	0.6
After being dethroned as Head of Household, Rylie confronts Mickey, feeling blindsided and now fearing he could be in danger of being nominated. Mickey plans to target three of the four HouseGuests who were on the wrong side of last week’s eviction vote. On Day 25, Mickey nominates Keanu, Kelley, and Rylie for eviction. With Morgan and Rachel selected to play in the Power of Veto competition, Mickey hopes the nominations remain the same—her main target being Keanu. In the "Flee the Scene" veto competition, HouseGuests must cross a bridge by stepping on one of two tiles that would highlight red or green. When stepping on a green tile, they can proceed to one of the next two tiles, but if they stepped on a red tile they must restart from the beginning. In the final round, Keanu crosses in the fastest amount of time to defeat Rachel and wins the Golden Power of Veto. Rachel begins to advocates for Vince to go up. However, Vince deflects the target onto Jimmy, claiming he’s closely aligned with Keanu. On Day 28, Keanu uses the Veto on himself. Mickey names Jimmy as the replacement nominee.
950	14	"Episode 14"	Days 28–31	Thursday 8:00 p.m.	August 7, 2025	3.17	0.6
Jimmy's nomination shocks the house, especially with Will, Rachel, and Ava fully expecting Vince to be on the block. Meanwhile, Lauren, Vince, and Zach celebrate the unexpected move and Jimmy will lose the upcoming BB Block Buster competition so they can evict him this week. Jimmy expresses his loyalty to Mickey and warns that nominating him is a major mistake for her game. Ashley, Rachel, and Will scramble to rally votes in an effort to save Jimmy. In the "Safe Crackers" Block Buster, HouseGuests must maneuver a ball through a table maze, aiming to land it in three designated target holes. Rylie buzzes in first, securing his safety. On Day 31, Jimmy is evicted from the Big Brother house by a vote of 9–2, with Rachel and Ashley casting the only votes to keep him.
Week 5
951	15	"Big Brother: Unlocked 8/8/25"	N/A	Friday 8:00 p.m.	August 8, 2025	1.44	0.2
Former Big Brother winners Derrick Levasseur (from season 16) and Taylor Hale (from season 24) return to recap and revisit the last two weeks of Big Brother. Some segments include, "Big Move/Bad Move", "Terrible Take", "The Rant Room", "Cutting Room Floor" and "Getting Jaggy with It". Note: Special guests include actor Jerry O'Connell, Big Brother 26 winner Chelsie Baham, Big Brother 25 winner Jag Bains, former Big Brother 12 and 13 houseguest Brendon Villegas, The Mastermind and recent evictee Jimmy Heagerty.
952	16	"Episode 16"	Days 24, 30–32	Sunday 8:00 p.m.	August 10, 2025	3.32	0.6
Following Jimmy's eviction, Rachel is left feeling alone after losing yet another ally. The house begins speculating about who cast the other vote for Kelley. Meanwhile, Ashley works to cover her tracks, knowing she was the one who cast the rogue vote. Will, aware it was her, subtly helps redirect suspicion away from her. In the "Jack the Dipper" Head of Household competition, HouseGuests face off head-to-head. In each round, they watch Jack the Dipper double-dip into three separate bowls. HouseGuests must identify the bowl that Jack dipped into the most. The first to answer correctly moves on and selects the next two competitors, while the loser is eliminated. In the final round, Ava defeats Will to win the Head of Household. As the new HoH, Ava begins planning her nominations. She assures both Rachel and Zach that they are safe this week. Meanwhile, Mickey learns that Ava is targeting Keanu, Vince, and Ashley. Concerned that Ashley might not survive a vote, she wants to shift Ava's target. After discussions with Mickey and Will, Ava agree Zach may be a more strategic option than Ashley. On Day 32, Ava nominates Keanu, Vince, and Zach for eviction.
953	17	"Episode 17"	Days 28, 32–35	Wednesday 8:00 p.m.	August 13, 2025	3.13	0.6
After Ava's nominations, Zach is shocked to find himself on the block, especially after Ava had promised him safety. Morgan expresses concern to Mickey about having two members of their "Melting Pot" alliance, Vince and Zach, nominated. The three begin to suspect that Mickey may have influenced Ava's nominations. Meanwhile, Morgan becomes a growing target as she voices her opinions about Ava's reign as Head of Household. At the Veto draw, Katherine and Will are selected to compete alongside the nominees and the HoH. In the "Elusive Target" Veto competition, HouseGuests must slide a disk, aiming not to score the lowest each round. After each elimination, the eliminated player chooses either a prize or a punishment. At the end of the competition, Keanu, Vince, and Zach each receive a punishment, Will wins a trip to London, Ava walks away with $5,000, and Katherine secures the Golden Power of Veto. As jury talk intensifies, Rachel becomes upset upon learning that Morgan plans to "save" her in the game simply to ensure she sits on the jury. On Day 35, Katherine decides not to use the Power of Veto, leaving nominations the same. Zach decides not to use his "BB Buyoff" power.
954	18	"Episode 18"	Days 35–38	Thursday 8:00 p.m.	August 14, 2025	3.37	0.6
After the veto meeting, with Keanu, Vince, and Zach still on the block, the HouseGuests scramble to secure votes for their allies. Morgan is determined to get Keanu out, hoping that either Vince or Zach will win the upcoming Block Buster competition. Meanwhile, Ashley and Mickey go over the voting scenarios, but Ashley becomes increasingly frustrated with Mickey’s controlling behavior in the house. She refers to it as the "Mick-tatorship" when venting to Will and Rachel, who agree with her sentiments. Realizing he may be in danger, Zach regrets not using his secret power. Both Vince and Zach campaign for Morgan’s vote, in case they are the final two nominees. Zach finally reveals his secret power to Morgan, explaining he chose not to use it in order to protect her. In the “Jumbo Gemstones” Block Buster competition, HouseGuests must maneuver colored gemstones, aiming to sort four stacks by color by only moving one gem at a time. Keanu wins the competition, leaving Vince and Zach as the final nominees for the week. On Day 38, Zach is evicted from the Big Brother house by a vote of 8–2. Note: During the episode, Julie Chen Moonves announced the upcoming 38th season of The Amazing Race, featuring several previous HouseGuests.
Week 6
955	19	"Episode 19"	Days 38–39	Sunday 8:00 p.m.	August 17, 2025	3.47	0.8
With Zach now evicted, the house is feeling his loss. Rachel comforts Lauren, while the remaining “Melting Pot” alliance members begin plotting their path forward. Mickey tells Ashley and Will that Rachel may need to be one of the next HouseGuests to go, along with Keanu. Word gets back to Rachel when Ava warns her she could be in danger this week. In the “Party Slasher” Head of Household competition, HouseGuests are given five minutes to study six rooms before answering questions about the items they observed. In the final round, Rachel answers correctly and defeats Morgan to become the new Head of Household. Now in power, Rachel plans to shifts the dynamics of the house. Mickey, Morgan, and Vince begin to worry that they could be her targets, while Ashley, Ava, and Will feel relieved and safe. Keanu encourages Vince to make amends with Rachel. Rachel and Mickey have a conversation about whether she was coming after her. The tension between them is evident, largely stemming from Jimmy’s shocking nomination and eviction. Mickey then tries to throw Kelley under the bus. On Day 39, Rachel nominates Mickey, Morgan, and Vince for possible eviction.
956	20	"Episode 20"	Days 39–42	Wednesday 8:00 p.m.	August 20, 2025	3.04	0.6
With the initial nominations set, the house comforts Mickey, Morgan, and Vince. Mickey begins attacking Rachel’s character in conversations with Ashley, Ava, and Will. Up in the HoH room, Morgan confesses to Rachel that she had been targeting her and apologizes. Meanwhile, Rylie and Katherine continue to grow closer. Though Katherine remains more reserved, Rylie is fully invested in their showmance. For this week's Veto Competition, Lauren and Will are selected to join. In the "OTEV the Hogfather", players must find and return the correct HouseGuest's name based on OTEV’s clues. Anyone who returns with an incorrect answer or is the last are eliminated. In round three, Lauren is the only one to return with the correct answer and wins the Golden Power of Veto. Rachel works hard to convince Lauren not to use the veto, while each nominee pitches their case in hopes of being saved. Under pressure from all sides, Lauren weighs her options. Rachel even threatens to "blow up the house" if the veto is used. On Day 42, Lauren uses the Power of Veto to save Vince. In response, Rachel names Rylie as the replacement nominee.
957	21	"Episode 21"	Days 2, 36, 42–45	Thursday 8:00 p.m.	August 21, 2025	3.18	0.7
Reeling from Rachel's nomination of Rylie, Katherine is upset with Lauren for using the Veto. The house becomes divided over which nominee to evict, as all three, Morgan, Mickey, and Rylie, are seen as major threats. Vince finds himself conflicted, having promised his vote to each of the nominees. Meanwhile, Mickey begins to rub houseguests the wrong way with her conversations and strategies. Morgan hopes to rally enough support to stay over Mickey or Rylie. A new alliance, "The Judges," forms, consisting of Ashley, Morgan, Rachel, Vince, and Will. In the "Settle the Score" Block Buster competition, nominees must roll a ball down a long ramp, trying to lock in the highest score within a two-minute time limit. Mickey wins the competition, removing herself from the block and leaving Morgan and Rylie as the final nominees. On Day 45, Rylie is evicted from the Big Brother house by a close vote of 5–4. Note: Taylor Hale the winner of big brother season 24 and the runner up of big brother Reindeer Games and Derrick Levasseur the winner of big brother season 16 join Julie Chen Moonves on stage to discuss the special Sunday episode of Big Brother: Unlocked with Survivor winner Rob Mariano.
Week 7
958	22	"Episode 22" (Note: This episode included an embedded installment of Big Brother: Unlocked that was originally scheduled to air independently on August 22.)	Days 31, 42, 45–46	Sunday 8:00 p.m.	August 24, 2025	3.20	0.7
Former Big Brother winners Derrick Levasseur (from season 16) and Taylor Hale (from season 24) return to recap and revisit the last few weeks of Big Brother. Some segments include, "Big Move/Bad Move", "BB Breaking News", "The Rant Room", "Wine or Whine" and "Terrible Take". Following the Big Brother: Unlocked portion, the house is left emotional following Rylie’s eviction. Katherine and Kelley are frustrated with those who voted to keep Morgan, while Ava and Vince feel manipulated into doing others’ dirty work. Meanwhile, Mickey continues to clash with Ashley and Will, and some HouseGuests are starting to view Rachel as the biggest remaining threat. In the “Mystère Express” Head of Household competition, players hang on a tilting wall while being doused in water and slime. The first three to fall, Ashley, Will, and Morgan, are named Have-Nots for the week. Katherine and Vince are the final two left, with Vince ultimately winning HOH. Vince voices Mickey as an easy target. Keanu, however, floats the idea of using Rachel as a pawn, as she could have the votes to win the game if she makes it to the end. On Day 46, Vince nominates Ava, Kelley, and Mickey for eviction. Note: Special guests include Survivor winner Rob Mariano, Will Williams' family, Big Brother 18 winner Nicole Franzel and actor Jerry O'Connell.
959	23	"Episode 23"	Days 46–49	Wednesday 8:00 p.m.	August 27, 2025	3.45	0.8
Mickey feels betrayed by both of her former "Melting Pot" allies, Vince and Morgan. Her messy gameplay further isolates her from Ashley, Morgan, and Will, ultimately making her the biggest target on the block. Meanwhile, Rachel grows increasingly nervous that she could become the replacement nominee. Katherine and Keanu both set their sights on Rachel. At the Veto draw, Keanu and Will are selected to compete. In the Veto competition, "Wine to Die For", players must randomly present two glasses of wine, one poisoned and one safe, to a chosen target, who must then guess which glass is safe. Any HouseGuest who drinks poison twice is eliminated. In the final round, Vince drinks the poisoned wine and Mickey wins the Golden Power of Veto. After the competition, members of the "Judges" alliance each approach Vince individually, urging him not to nominate Rachel. They argue that Katherine would be a safer replacement nominee. Kelley begins to feel hurt by Rachel’s bluntness and frequent side comments. Other HouseGuests continue to view Kelley as a wildcard in the game. On Day 49, Mickey uses the Power of Veto on herself. Vince names Katherine as the replacement nominee.
960	24	"Episode 24"	Days 49–52	Thursday 8:00 p.m.	August 28, 2025	3.36	0.7
After the Veto ceremony, Keanu and Kelley feel burned yet again by Vince. Ava has been guaranteed safety from other HouseGuests if she were against either Katherine or Kelley. Meanwhile, Rachel and Keanu continue to flip-flop between frenemies and now full-blown enemies. Keanu also makes an effort to mend his relationship with Vince. Lauren and Ashley discuss the possibility of keeping Katherine over Ava, unaware that Ava is secretly in the room and overhears everything. Determined not to go down without a fight, Katherine rallies for votes to stay. In the "Hilltop Heist" Block Buster competition, nominees must guide a ball down a puzzle-like ramp in the fastest time. Kelley wins the competition, removing herself from the block and leaving Ava and Katherine as the final nominees. On Day 52, Katherine is evicted from the Big Brother house by a vote of 7–1, with Lauren casting the only vote to keep her.
Week 8
961	25	"Episode 25"	Days 52–53	Sunday 8:00 p.m.	August 31, 2025	2.98	0.6
Following Katherine’s eviction, Lauren is hurt by the loss of yet another ally. Several HouseGuests start to regret not evicting Kelley back in Week 4, when she sat on the block next to Jimmy. Keanu makes an effort to mend fences with Rachel, regretting having targeted her. Videos begin playing on the Memory Wall. In the "Mystère Moments" HoH competition, players are tested with a series of True or False questions based on the video clips. Keanu answers the final question correctly and becomes the new Head of Household. Keanu sets his sights on Morgan, believing she’s been whispering in Vince’s ear all season and driving his decision making. With the "Frenemies" back on, Keanu and Rachel attempt to align their goals for the week. Vince, sensing the danger, pleads with Keanu not to put him on the block next to Morgan, even promising not to use the Veto on her if he wins it. Keanu isn’t swayed and flatly tells Vince he’ll be nominated. Keanu searches for a third nominee and is stuck between Mickey or Ava. On Day 53, Keanu nominates Mickey, Morgan, and Vince for eviction.
962	26	"Episode 26"	Days 53–56	Wednesday 8:00 p.m.	September 3, 2025	3.22	0.7
The "Judges" alliance now feel cornered, with two of their members on the block. Meanwhile, Ava and Ashley quietly celebrate avoiding nomination under Keanu's HoH reign. Mickey begins working to repair fractured relationships in case she remains a target by the end of the week. Meanwhile, Vince and Morgan continue to get closer in the house and other HouseGuests begin to notice. At the Veto Draw, Kelley and Lauren are selected to compete alongside Keanu, Mickey, Morgan, and Vince. In the “Charcuterie Protection Agency” Power of Veto competition, hosted by Big Brother 26 contestant Angela Murray, players race to stack 35 variously sized charcuterie pieces in the fastest time. Morgan emerges victorious, securing the Power of Veto. With Morgan holding the Veto, Keanu shifts his strategy. Wanting to protect Vince, he contemplates nominating Ashley, despite having previously promised her safety. Rachel campaigns to keep Ashley off the block, urging Keanu to consider nominating Lauren or Ava instead. Keanu attempts to persuade Morgan to use the Veto on Vince rather than herself. On Day 56, Morgan uses the Power of Veto to remove herself from the block. Keanu names Ashley as the replacement nominee, causing a blowup by Ashley during the ceremony.
963	27	"Episode 27"	Days 56–59	Thursday 8:00 p.m.	September 4, 2025	3.43	0.7
After the fallout from the Veto Ceremony, Rachel and Ashley continue to clash with Keanu. Ashley's allies rally around her, working to secure her safety for the week. Meanwhile, Mickey grows increasingly anxious, fearing she has become biggest target nominated. With the vote hanging in the balance, Ava emerges as the critical swing vote. Both Vince and Mickey scramble to secure the necessary four votes to stay, each attempting to sway Ava to their side. In the "Forensic Frenzy" Block Buster competition, the nominees must catch colored balls swirling around them in an air machine and place them into a tube in a specific color sequence. Vince manages to complete the sequence first, securing his safety and taking himself off the block. This leaves Ashley and Mickey as the final nominees. On Day 59, Mickey is evicted from the Big Brother house by a vote of 6–1. At the end of the episode, Julie informed the remaining HouseGuests that they have reached the Jury Phase (the halfway point in the game). The Mastermind returns and interrupts her outro to introduce "The Mastermind's Month of Mayhem" to finish out the game. Note: Big Brother: Unlocked surprise guest Lance Bass joins Julie Chen Moonves on stage to discuss the season.
Week 9
964	28	"Big Brother: Unlocked 9/5/25"	N/A	Friday 8:00 p.m.	September 5, 2025	1.71	0.2
Former Big Brother winners Derrick Levasseur (from season 16) and Taylor Hale (from season 24) return to recap and revisit the last two weeks of Big Brother. Some segments include, "BB Breaking News", "Big Move/Bad Move", "BB Fantasy Draft", "Pec-culiar Behavior", "The Rant Room" and "Cutting Room Floor". Note: Special guests include former NSYNC member Lance Bass, Big Brother 26 winner Chelsie Baham, Ava Pearl's friends and family, former Big Brother 10 and Big Brother 11 houseguest Jessie Godderz and recent evictee Mickey Lee.
965	29	"Episode 29"	Days 59–60	Tuesday 8:00 p.m.	September 9, 2025	3.35	0.7
In celebration of making jury, the HouseGuests were invited to the neighboring "White Locust" resort. But just as the festivities began, "The Mastermind" appeared with a chilling announcement: one of them would become the first juror that very night. To host the evening’s events, Big Brother fan favorite Tyler Crispen from Big Brother 20 and Big Brother 22 returned to lead the competitions. In the first challenge, "Survive the White Locust," HouseGuests must slide three totems into three separate green zones on a game board. Ava clocked the fastest time, earning safety for the night. However, her win came with a twist. She had to nominate one HouseGuest to enter the Mastermind’s "Maniacal Maze". In this challenge, the HouseGuest would have six and a half minutes to complete the maze. If successful, they must nominate another HouseGuest to compete, but with one less minute on the clock. Failure to finish means immediate eviction. Ava chose Vince to go first. Vince then selected Lauren, who chose Morgan, who in turn chose Rachel. Unfortunately for Rachel, she failed to complete the maze in time and is eliminated from the game.
966	30	"Episode 30"	Days 60–63	Wednesday 8:00 p.m.	September 10, 2025	3.21	0.7
After Rachel's sudden elimination, Lauren is announced as the new Head of Household after completing the maze in the fastest time. Morgan feels hurt that Vince chose Lauren over her to compete in the challenge. Vince tries to convince Lauren to keep Morgan safe for the week. Meanwhile, Rachel's allies and "frenemies" scramble to rethink their strategies now that she’s out of the game. On Day 60, Lauren nominates Ashley, Morgan, and Will for eviction. Morgan begins to worry, realizing she may be Lauren's target for the week. Lauren plans to backdoor Keanu if the Veto were to be used. At the Veto draw, Ava and Vince are selected to play alongside the nominees and Lauren. In the "BB Comics" veto competition, players must zipline past a wall of superhero-themed comics, memorize the order, and recreate the correct sequence on their boards. Morgan wins the competition, completing it in the fastest time thus winning the Golden Power of Veto. On Day 63, Morgan uses the Veto to remove herself from the block. Lauren names Keanu as the replacement nominee.
967	31	"Episode 31"	Days 63–66	Thursday 8:00 p.m.	September 11, 2025	3.20	0.6
With Keanu now on the block, the remaining members of the "Judges" alliance work to secure votes to stay. Ashley and Will also campaign hard, preparing for the possibility that Keanu could win the Block Buster competition and save himself. Having both lost Rachel as an ally, Keanu and Ashley begin to form a plan to team up moving forward. Meanwhile, Morgan and Vince continue to clash over their strategic direction, creating further tension between them. Morgan worries Vince may continue to choose Lauren over herself. In the "Key to Safety" Block Buster competition, nominees must untangle a rope attached to themselves. Keanu finishes first, earning safety and removing himself from the block. This leaves Ashley and Will as the final nominees. On Day 66, Will is evicted from the Big Brother house by a close vote of 3–2, with Ava and Kelley casting their to votes keep him. Note: Rachel Reilly, the first jury member, joins Julie Chen Moonves on stage to discuss her eviction and game this season.
Week 10
968	32	"Episode 32"	Days 66–70	Wednesday 8:00 p.m.	September 17, 2025	3.11	0.6
Following Will's eviction, emotions run high as finale night draws closer and the number of HouseGuests continues to dwindle. Morgan and Vince grow increasingly close, sparking gossip about Vince's relationships both inside and outside the house. Zingbot returns to "zing" the remaining HouseGuests. In the Head of Household competition, "The Last Zing", players must answer a series of true-or-false questions. In the tie-breaker, Vince beats Kelley to become the new Head of Household. Ashley and Morgan start pushing Vince to nominate Lauren. Vince pulls Lauren aside to gauge her willingness to be a pawn. She strongly resists, reminding him of their supposed Final 2 deal. On Day 67, Vince nominates Ava, Keanu, and Kelley. Vince continues to be caught between Lauren and Morgan. Lauren worries she could be a potential renomination if the Power of Veto is used. During the Veto draw, Ashley is the only HouseGuest not selected to play. In the "BB CSI" Veto competition, players must balance and transfer 25 pieces of evidence onto the lens of a giant magnifying glass. Morgan finished first and wins the POV. She immediately plans to use it on one of the nominees. Ava pitches to Morgan to use the veto on her not Keanu. Morgan continues day and night to get Vince to nominate Lauren. Vince remains uncertain but feels the pressure. On Day 70, Morgan uses the Power of Veto to remove Ava from the block. Vince names Lauren as the replacement nominee.
969	33	"Episode 33"	Days 66–73	Thursday 8:00 p.m.	September 18, 2025	3.29	0.7
After her nomination, Lauren is emotionally hurt by Vince’s decision. Each HouseGuest has a different agenda regarding who they want evicted this week. Vince wants Kelley to go. Ava, Kelley, and Lauren want Keanu out, while Ashley, Keanu, and Morgan want Lauren out. Morgan and Vince strongly disagree on which move is best for their games. In the BB Block Buster competition, “Steal Power Orbs for the Mastermind So He Can Bring His Lair On-Line,” the nominees must collect four balls and drop them into a crystal jar. Lauren wins the competition leaving Keanu and Kelley as the final nominees for the week. After the votes are cast, there is a tie, which Vince must break. On Day 73, Kelley is evicted from the Big Brother house by a vote of 3–2. Following Kelley's eviction, the Mastermind returns to inform the remaining HouseGuests of Double Eviction Night. In the "Wretched Reactor" Head of Household competition, HouseGuests must roll and land five balls at the top of a long ramp. Morgan wins the competition and becomes the new Head of Household. She immediately nominates Keanu and Lauren for eviction. In the "Masterfind" Veto competition, all HouseGuests must identify where the Mastermind is located on the screen, either A, B, or C. In a tie-breaker round, Keanu defeats Morgan and wins the Power of Veto. He uses the veto on himself, and Morgan names Ava as the replacement nominee. On Day 73, Lauren is evicted from the Big Brother house by a vote of 2–1. Note: Big Brother: Unlocked surprise guest James Gunn joins Julie Chen Moonves on stage to discuss the season.
Week 11
970	34	"Big Brother: Unlocked 9/19/25"	N/A	Friday 8:00 p.m.	September 19, 2025	1.57	0.2
For the final time this season, former Big Brother winners Derrick Levasseur (from season 16) and Taylor Hale (from season 24) return to recap and revisit the season as a whole. Some segments include, "BB Breaking News", "Big Move/Bad Move", "The BBies", "BB Fantasy Draft", "The Rant Room" and "Cutting Room Floor". Note: Special guests include American filmmaker James Gunn, Big Brother 12 and Big Brother 14 houseguest Britney Haynes, Zingbot, Big Brother 26 winner Chelsie Baham and jury members Rachel Reilly and Will Williams.
971	35	"Episode 35"	Days 73–74	Sunday 10:00 p.m.	September 21, 2025	2.01	0.4
Following the Double Eviction, the Final Five celebrate surviving this far. Ashley and Ava attempt to form an alliance, aiming to reach the Final Three alongside Keanu. The Mastermind returns to take over the first eviction cycle of the week, and this eviction will come with a unique eviction vote following the standard Head of Household and Veto competitions. In the "Torturous Trials" Head of Household competition, HouseGuests must hold the Mastermind’s mask with a sword, with the last player standing declared the winner. Vince outlasts the others, becoming the new HoH. "The Judges" alliance celebrates another win. Ava fears she’s headed straight to the block. Ashley sees an opportunity to lay the groundwork for others to target Morgan, but Vince struggles to see this as the best move for his own game. Although, other HouseGuests begin to voice that Morgan is the one truly pulling the strings behind all of Vince’s decisions. On Day 74, Vince nominates Ava and Keanu for eviction.
972	36	"Episode 36"	Days 74–77	Wednesday 10:00 p.m.	September 24, 2025	2.33	0.4
After being nominated, Keanu is once again hurt by Vince's betrayal. He knows that to win the game, he has to win out from this point forward. Ava and Ashley discuss the possibility of targeting Morgan if Keanu manages to save himself, recognizing her as the biggest threat left in the game. In the "Masterpieces" tiny veto competition, HouseGuests must use tweezers to complete a miniature picture puzzle. Morgan finishes first, winning her fourth Power of Veto of the season. Keanu tries to use his jury vote to sway Vince into keeping him. In the HOH bed, Morgan and Vince speak in code, subtly reaffirming their deep connection and potential relationship after the game. The HouseGuests receive emotional video messages from home, giving them a morale boost. Vince is shaken after not seeing his girlfriend in his video, prompting him to reflect on his relationship with Morgan. Keanu makes a final pitch to Ashley, offering to be the one to take out Morgan if she keeps him in the game. Morgan decides not to use the Power of Veto. Shortly after, on Day 77, Keanu is evicted from the Big Brother house in a public vote of 2–0.
973	37	"Episode 37"	Days 77–80	Thursday 8:00 p.m.	September 25, 2025	3.00	0.5
Immediately following Keanu's eviction, the HouseGuests begin the “Forensi Scope” Head of Household competition. Players must navigate a giant cube from the inside to position the correct side facing up on a platform to score point. Morgan is the first to score three points, earning her second Head of Household. Morgan celebrates her win and reassures Vince that he is safe for the week. Ava and Ashley begin preparing for the Power of Veto competition, hoping to win and force Morgan to nominate Vince. Ava also begins subtly campaigning to Vince, trying to secure his support over Ashley. On Day 78, Morgan nominates Ashley and Ava for eviction. In the “Organized Crime” Power of Veto competition, players must correctly place major events from the season in chronological order according to the days they occurred. Morgan finishes first, securing her fifth Power of Veto win of the season. Morgan begins to be pulled in all directions as each HouseGuest tries to secure a spot in the final three. Morgan chooses not to use the Power of Veto, leaving Vince with the sole vote to evict. On Day 80, Ava is evicted from the Big Brother House. Note: Keanu Soto, the fifth jury member, joins Julie Chen Moonves on stage to discuss his eviction and game this season.
Week 12
974	38	"Episode 38"	Various; Day 80	Friday 8:00 p.m.	September 26, 2025	1.95	0.2
Following Ava's eviction, the "Judges" celebrate securing their spots in the Final Three. They reflect on Ava's dramatic final hours in the house. Before her eviction, Ava delivered a parting shot by revealing to Morgan that Vince had been telling her he might be willing to cut Morgan if he wins the final Head of Household. With Ava gone, the Final Three take time to reminisce about the biggest moments that defined the season. In the jury house, new jurors Kelley, Lauren, and Keanu arrive and are welcomed by Rachel and Will. The five catch up and dive into discussions about the past few weeks of gameplay. The final Head of Household competition begins with Part 1 "Locate the Lair." In this competition, each HouseGuest must hang onto a flying drone for as long as possible to secure a direct spot in the final round of the HOH competition. The episode ends on a dramatic cliffhanger setting the stage for the season finale of Big Brother.
975	39	"Episode 39"	Days 80–83	Sunday 8:32 p.m. (Note: "Episode 39" was originally scheduled to air at 8:30 p.m., but was delayed to 8:32 due to overrun of an NFL game.)	September 28, 2025	4.25	1.0
Returning to Part 1 of the final Head of Household competition, the Final 3 battle it out for a guaranteed spot in Part 3 of the competition. Morgan outlasts both Ashley and Vince, securing her place in the final round. Big Brother 16 runner-up and Big Brother 22 winner Cody Calafiore hosts the jury roundtable. After Ava arrives as the final jury member, the group discusses the Final 3 and debates who is most deserving of the win. Big Brother 16 HouseGuest Frankie Grande hosts Part 2 of the HoH competition, "Unmask the Mastermind," where HouseGuests must swing from a zipline to destroy three sets of blocks. They then search for special blocks that reveal the faces of six HouseGuests. Once the puzzle is completed, they open an envelope containing clues to help decode a password. Vince blows his lead allowing Ashley to win and advance to face Morgan in Part 3. In the final round, "Perjury Duty," the HouseGuests must correctly answer questions based on statements made by jury members. Ashley wins the Final Head of Household and votes to evict Morgan from the Big Brother house. The jury joins Julie Chen Moonves on stage to ask their final questions to the finalists, Ashley and Vince. After the final statements, the jury casts their votes for the winner of Big Brother. The pre-jury members also return to the stage to share their thoughts on the season. After falsely revealing Big Brother 2 winner and Big Brother 7: All Stars HouseGuest Will Kirby as "The Mastermind", the shocking truth is finally exposed. There hasn’t been just one Mastermind this season, but three. The real "Masterminds" are revealed to be surprise guests from earlier in the season, Frankie Grande and Jessie Godderz, as well as Big Brother 8 HouseGuest and America's Player Eric Stein. On Day 83, Ashley is crowned the winner of Big Brother by a vote of 6-1, with Morgan being the only vote for Vince. Keanu is awarded America's Favorite HouseGuest with over 63% of the votes.

== Voting history ==
Color key:

Winner
Runner-up
Head of Household
Nominated for eviction
Immune from eviction
Not eligible to vote
Won immunity via competition
Evicted / Eliminated

Big Brother 27 voting history
	Week 1	Week 2	Week 3	Week 4	Week 5	Week 6	Week 7	Week 8	Week 9		Week 10		Week 11 (Note: This week was a condensed double eviction week. Over the course of one week, HouseGuests will play two full cycles of Big Brother within a shorter timespan, cumulating in two evictions within one week.)		Week 12	
	Week 1	Week 2	Week 3	Week 4	Week 5	Week 6	Week 7	Week 8	Day 59 (Note: Immediately after Mickey's eviction, Ava won the "Survive the White Locust" competition and was granted immunity from the surprise elimination. She had to nominate a HouseGuest to participate in the Mastermind’s "Maniacal Maze". If that contestant finishes the maze in the allotted time, they will then pick another HouseGuest to compete next. This HouseGuest will have less time than the player who went before them. This process repeats until someone loses the competition and is eliminated from the game. The HouseGuest that completes the maze in the fastest time would then become the next Head of Household.)	Day 60	Day 67	Day 73 (Note: This week was a Double Eviction week. That means following the first eviction, the remaining HouseGuests will play a week's worth of games – including Head of Household and Power of Veto competitions, and the Nomination, Veto, and Eviction ceremonies – during the live show, culminating in a second eviction for the week.)	Day 74	Day 77	Day 83	Finale
Head of Household	Vince	Jimmy	Lauren	~~Rylie~~; Mickey (Note: Mickey used her "HoH Interrogation" power she earned during the "BB Break In" competition. By activating it, she gained the opportunity to dethrone Rylie as the Head of Household, as long as she went undetected during his interrogation of the house. Rylie misidentified the usurper as Ashley, thereby allowing Mickey to become the new Head of Household.)	Ava	Rachel	Vince	Keanu	(None)	Lauren	Vince	Morgan	Vince	Morgan	Ashley	(None)
Nominations (initial)	Amy; Ashley; Zae	Adrian; Keanu; Kelley	Keanu; Kelley; Will	Keanu; Kelley; Rylie	Keanu; Vince; Zach	Mickey; Morgan; Vince	Ava; Kelley; Mickey	Mickey; Morgan; Vince	(None)	Ashley; Morgan; Will	Ava; Keanu; Kelley	Keanu; Lauren	Ava; Keanu	Ashley; Ava	(None)	(None)
Veto winner(s)	Ashley	Keanu (Note: Keanu used the "Mystery Competitor" power he earned during the "BB Break In" competition. By activating it, Kaycee Clark from Big Brother 20 entered the competition to play on Keanu's behalf. Kaycee won, earning Keanu the Power of Veto and used the veto to remove himself from the block. Jimmy selected Amy to be his replacement nominee.); Kelley (Note: Kelley used the "Mystery Veto" power she earned during the "BB Break In" competition. By activating it, she earned an opportunity to win a special veto after the Veto Ceremony. Kelley passed the challenge and used the special veto to remove herself from the block. As Keanu had removed himself from the block earlier, he was ineligible to be nominated. Jimmy selected Will to be her replacement nominee.)	Keanu	Keanu	Katherine	Lauren	Mickey	Morgan	(None)	Morgan	Morgan	Keanu	Morgan	Morgan	(None)	(None)
Block Buster winner	Kelley	Adrian	Kelley	Rylie	Keanu	Mickey	Kelley	Vince	(None)	Keanu	Lauren	(None)			(None)	(None)
Nominations (final)	Amy; Zae	Amy; Will	Adrian; Will	Jimmy; Kelley	Vince; Zach	Morgan; Rylie	Ava; Katherine	Ashley; Mickey	~~Vince~~; ~~Lauren~~; ~~Morgan~~; Rachel	Ashley; Will	Keanu; Kelley	Ava; Lauren	Ava; Keanu	Ashley; Ava	Morgan; Vince	(None)
Ashley	Zae	Amy	Adrian	Kelley	Zach	Rylie	Katherine	Nominated	No vote	Nominated	Kelley	Lauren	Keanu	Nominated	Morgan (Note: As Head of Household, Ashley chose to evict Morgan.)	Winner
Vince	Head of Household	Amy	Adrian	Jimmy	Nominated	Rylie	Head of Household	Ashley (Note: This HouseGuest won the BB Block Buster competition and was saved from possible eviction.)	Lauren	Will	Kelley (Note: As the vote was tied, the Head of Household cast the tie-breaking vote.)	Ava	Head of Household	Ava	Nominated	Runner-up
Morgan	Zae	Amy	Adrian	Jimmy	Zach	Nominated	Katherine	Mickey	Rachel	Will	Kelley	Head of Household	Keanu	Head of Household	Evicted (Day 83)	Vince
Ava	Zae (Note: Since Rachel entered the game late, she was granted immunity from the first eviction. Along with herself, three other HouseGuests would also be safe after they completed a Chain of Safety. She chose to grant immunity to Will; Will chose Zach and Zach chose Ava.)	Amy	Adrian	Jimmy	Head of Household	Rylie	Nominated	Mickey	Vince	Ashley	Keanu	Nominated	Nominated	Nominated	Evicted (Day 80)	Ashley
Keanu	Amy	Amy	Will	Jimmy	Zach	Morgan	Katherine	Head of Household	No vote	Will	Nominated	Lauren	Nominated	Evicted (Day 77)		Ashley
Lauren	Zae	Amy	Head of Household	Jimmy	Zach	Morgan	Ava	Mickey	Morgan	Head of Household	Keanu	Nominated	Evicted (Day 73)			Ashley
Kelley	Amy	Amy	Will	Nominated	Zach	Morgan	Katherine	Mickey	No vote	Ashley	Nominated	Evicted (Day 73)				Ashley
Will	Amy	Nominated	Nominated	Jimmy	Vince	Rylie	Katherine	Mickey	No vote	Nominated	Evicted (Day 66)					Ashley
Rachel	Zae	Amy	Adrian	Kelley	Vince	Head of Household	Katherine	Mickey	Nominated	Eliminated (Day 60)						Ashley
Mickey	Zae	Amy	Adrian	Head of Household	Zach	Rylie	Katherine	Nominated	Evicted (Day 59)							
Katherine	Zae	Amy	Will	Jimmy	Zach	Morgan	Nominated	Evicted (Day 52)								
Rylie	Zae	Amy	Will	Jimmy	Zach	Nominated	Evicted (Day 45)									
Zach	Amy	Amy	Adrian	Jimmy	Nominated	Evicted (Day 38)										
Jimmy	Zae	Head of Household	Adrian	Nominated	Evicted (Day 31)											
Adrian	Amy	Amy	Nominated	Evicted (Day 24)												
Amy	Nominated	Nominated	Evicted (Day 17)													
Zae	Nominated	Evicted (Day 10)														
Evicted	Zae; 9 of 14 votes to evict	Amy; 13 of 13 votes to evict	Adrian; 8 of 12 votes to evict	Jimmy; 9 of 11 votes to evict	Zach; 8 of 10 votes to evict	Rylie; 5 of 9 votes to evict	Katherine; 7 of 8 votes to evict	Mickey; 6 of 7 votes to evict	Rachel; Eliminated by competition	Will; 3 of 5 votes to evict	Kelley; 3 of 5 votes to evict	Lauren; 2 of 3 votes to evict	Keanu; 2 of 2 votes to evict	Ava; Vince's choice to evict	Morgan; Ashley's choice to evict	Ashley; 6 votes to win
Evicted	Zae; 9 of 14 votes to evict	Amy; 13 of 13 votes to evict	Adrian; 8 of 12 votes to evict	Jimmy; 9 of 11 votes to evict	Zach; 8 of 10 votes to evict	Rylie; 5 of 9 votes to evict	Katherine; 7 of 8 votes to evict	Mickey; 6 of 7 votes to evict	Rachel; Eliminated by competition	Will; 3 of 5 votes to evict	Kelley; 3 of 5 votes to evict	Lauren; 2 of 3 votes to evict	Keanu; 2 of 2 votes to evict	Ava; Vince's choice to evict	Morgan; Ashley's choice to evict	Vince; 1 vote to win

== Production ==
=== Development ===
On May 14, 2025, CBS announced that Big Brother 27 would premiere on July 10, 2025. Promos for the season suggested an overall theme related to secrets and mysteries, with television commercials featuring whispered conversations, and a promotional image of host Julie Chen Moonves posing with a wall of skeleton keys described as being able to "[unlock] unexpected mysteries in the Big Brother house". Filming began on July 8, 2025.

The theme for Big Brother 27 was ultimately revealed to be "A Summer of Mystery", with the house being re-themed as the "Hotel Mystère". The A.I. Arena twist from the previous season was revived as the "BB Block Buster"; as before, the HoH picks three nominees for eviction instead of two, with the three nominees then competing in a challenge for a chance to be saved from eviction.

== Release ==
=== Broadcast ===
The season premiered on CBS on July 10, 2025. Thereafter, new episodes aired on Sundays, Wednesdays, and Thursdays at 8:00 p.m. eastern time (ET), with Wednesday night episodes lasting 90 minutes long. A new companion show—Big Brother: Unlocked— aired bi-weekly on Fridays beginning July 25; the show featured additional footage and behind the scenes content, interviews, and guest analysis from alumni of past seasons.

=== Streaming ===
Following their broadcast, new episodes stream on Paramount+ and CBS On Demand. As with previous seasons, Paramount+ is also providing access to 24/7 live feeds. The live feeds also stream on Pluto TV in a free advertisement-supported format.

== Critical response ==
In Week 9, a twist was introduced where an elimination by competition would be held rather than a traditional eviction cycle. The winner of the initial competition would start a chain reaction for the remaining players, and the person that did not complete the following competition in the allotted time would be eliminated. This led to the elimination of returning player Rachel Reilly, who had never been nominated for eviction prior to that week. The twist received backlash by some fans, commentators, and former alumni for breaking the core mechanics of the game. Some critics were also upset that the following Head of Household was determined by who completed the elimination competition the fastest before Reilly was eliminated.

While the competition had intervals for the players to strategize and campaign for who to pick for the next round, critics argued that even the concept of depending on a competition to avoid elimination was a fundamental betrayal of the Big Brother formula. It was also discussed how the twist tipped the scales too favorably for contestants that were better at competitions, and producers faced accusations of trying to emulate The Challenge instead.
