= Big Brother 26 (American season) =

Big Brother
- Season 26
- Big Brother 26 title card An editor has nominated the above file for discussion of its purpose and/or potential deletion. You are welcome to participate in the discussion and help reach a consensus.
- Hosted by: Julie Chen Moonves; Jerry O'Connell
- No. of days: 90
- No. of houseguests: 16
- Winner: Chelsie Baham
- Runner-up: Makensy Manbeck
- America's Favorite HouseGuest: Tucker Des Lauriers
- No. of episodes: 39

Release
- Original network: CBS
- Original release: July 17 – October 13, 2024

Additional information
- Filming dates: July 16 – October 13, 2024

Season chronology
- ← Previous; Season 25 Next → Season 27

Big Brother 26 is the twenty-sixth season of the American reality television program Big Brother. The program is an adaptation of the franchise created in 1999 by John de Mol Jr. The season features an artificial intelligence theme. It premiered on CBS on July 17, 2024, and concluded on October 13, 2024.

The season ran for ninety days, ending on October 13, 2024, when Chelsie Baham was crowned the winner, defeating Makensy Manbeck by a vote of 7–0. Tucker Des Lauriers was voted America's Favorite HouseGuest, becoming the first pre-jury HouseGuest to claim this prize.

== Format ==
Big Brother follows a group of contestants, known as HouseGuests, who live inside a custom-built house outfitted with cameras and microphones recording their every move 24 hours a day. The HouseGuests are sequestered with no contact with the outside world. During their stay, the HouseGuests share their thoughts on their day-to-day lives inside the house in a private room known as the Diary Room. Each week, the HouseGuests compete in competitions in order to win power and safety inside the house. At the start of each week, the Houseguests compete in a Head of Household (abbreviated as "HOH") competition. The winner of the HoH competition is immune from eviction and selects two HouseGuests to be nominated for eviction.

Six HouseGuests are then selected to compete in the Power of Veto (abbreviated as "PoV") competition: the reigning HoH, the nominees are guaranteed to play with the other slots being assigned by random draw. The winner of the PoV competition has the right to either revoke the nomination of one of the nominated HouseGuests or leave them as is. If the veto winner uses this power, the HoH must immediately nominate another HouseGuest for eviction. The PoV winner is also immune from being named as the replacement nominee. On eviction night, all HouseGuests vote to evict one of the nominees, though the Head of Household and the nominees are not allowed to vote. This vote is conducted in the privacy of the Diary Room. In the event of a tie, the Head of Household casts the tie-breaking vote. The nominee with the most votes is evicted from the house. The last seven evicted HouseGuests comprise the Jury and are sequestered in a separate location following their eviction and ultimately decide the winner of the season. The Jury is only allowed to see the competitions and ceremonies that include all of the remaining HouseGuests; they are not shown any interviews or other footage that might include strategy or details regarding nominations. The viewing public is able to award an additional prize by choosing "America's Favorite HouseGuest." All evicted HouseGuests are eligible to win this award except for those who either voluntarily leave or are forcibly removed for rule violations.

== HouseGuests ==
The cast of the twenty-sixth season of Big Brother Top: Kenney, Kimo, Tucker, Makensy, Lisa, Chelsie, and Quinn Bottom: Cedric, Joseph, Taylor , T'Kor, Brooklyn, Cam, Rubina, Leah, and Matt

Online applications for the season were underway by January 2024 while in-person casting sessions occurred in March and April. The cast was revealed on July 15, 2024. At this time it was also revealed that the houseguests would have the power to vote in a seventeenth houseguest by a majority vote. This was later revealed to be a ruse that introduced the season's primary theme. Several Houseguests had made previous appearances on reality television: Angela Murray previously appeared on Dr. Phil's House Calls in 2021, The Price Is Right in 2019, and Let's Make a Deal. In 2019, Brooklyn Rivera appeared on Dr. Phil's titular talk show. In 2023, T'Kor Clottey appeared on Kelly Clarkson's talk show. In 2023, Rubina Bernabe appeared on Don't Forget the Lyrics!, winning $10,000.

Name	Age	Occupation	Residence	Result
Chelsie Baham	27	Nonprofit director	Rancho Cucamonga, California	Winner; Day 90
Makensy Manbeck	22	Construction project manager	Houston, Texas	Runner-up; Day 90
Cam Sullivan-Brown	25	Physical therapist	Bowie, Maryland	Evicted; Day 90
Rubina Bernabe	35	Event bartender	Los Angeles, California	Evicted; Day 87
Kimo Apaka	35	Mattress sales representative	Hilo, Hawaii	Evicted; Day 80
Taylor Neville	23	Multilingual Student	Boston Massachusetts	Evicted; Day 73
Leah Peters	26	VIP cocktail server	Miami, Florida	Evicted; Day 73
T'kor Clottey	23	Crochet business owner	Atlanta, Georgia	Evicted; Day 66
Quinn Martin	25	Nurse recruiter	Omaha, Nebraska	Evicted; Day 59
Joseph Rodriguez	30	Video store clerk	Tampa, Florida	Evicted; Day 52
Tucker Des Lauriers	30	Marketing/sales executive	Brooklyn, New York	Evicted; Day 45
Brooklyn Rivera	34	Business administrator	Dallas, Texas	Evicted; Day 38
Cedric Hodges	21	Former Marine	Boise, Idaho	Evicted; Day 31
Kenney Kelley	52	Former undercover cop	Boston, Massachusetts	Evicted; Day 24
Lisa Weintraub	33	Celebrity chef	Los Angeles, California	Evicted; Day 17
Matt Hardeman	25	Tech sales rep	Roswell, Georgia	Evicted; Day 10

=== Future appearances ===
In 2025, Cedric Hodges competed on The Challenge: Vets & New Threats. Later that year, Angela Murray, Chelsie Baham, Rubina Bernabe, and Tucker Des Lauriers also competed on The Amazing Race 38 each partnered with their respective family members. Murray then made a cameo appearance in Big Brother 27 to host the Week 8 Veto Competition. Baham also made appearances on Big Brother: Unlocked.

In 2026, Murray competed on Big Brother 28. Hodges competed on The Challenge: Cutthroat.

== Episodes ==
No. overall	No. in season	Title	Day(s)	Timeslot (ET)	Original release date	U.S. viewers (millions)	Rating (18–49)
Week 1
898	1	"Episode 1"	Day 1	Wednesday 9:00 p.m.	July 17, 2024	2.75	0.6
On Day 1, the first eight Houseguests—Angela, Cam, Chelsie, Joseph, Kimo, Makensy, Rubina, and Tucker—entered the newly designed Big Brother house. Julie informed them that they would be tasked with voting to decide whether a 17th Houseguest, AINSLEY, would be allowed to enter the competition. AINSLEY would need at least five of eight votes to compete. Angela, Joseph, Rubina, and Makensy voted to allow entry while Chelsie, Cam, Kimo, and Tucker voted no. AINSLEY then revealed herself to be an A.I. creation, her name a backronym for Artificial Intelligence Network Self Learning Entity, who would affect the game. The Houseguests then competed individually in timed memory competitions. The four that voted yes, participated for a secret power referred to as an "upgrade" to the game. The other four that voted no played a separate competition in which the loser would receive a "downgrade" that would harm their game. Makensy won her competition and received the upgrade and Chelsie lost the other competition, receiving a downgrade.
899	2	"Episode 2"	Day 1	Thursday 9:00 p.m.	July 18, 2024	2.36	0.5
The next eight Houseguests -- Brooklyn, Cedric, Kenney, Leah, Lisa, Matt, Quinn, and T'kor -- also moved in on Day 1. They then participated in the same vote to admit AINSLEY to the game, still unbeknownst to them that she is an A.I. entity. During this time, the first group of eight Houseguests were isolated individually. Leah and Quinn voted to allow entry to AINSLEY and the other six voted no. All eight also competed in individual upgrade and downgrade competitions that were modified from those the first eight played in. Quinn obtained an upgrade to his game and Cedric acquired the downgrade. Following the second set of the competitions, all sixteen Houseguests were allowed to meet. Cedric and Chelsie were informed (by AINSLEY) that their games were being downgraded to "mascots" for the week, not permitting them to participate in the first Head of Household or Power of Veto competitions as well as the vote to evict. Among Makensy and Quinn, one of them would receive a "Deep Fake H.O.H." while the other would get "America's Veto".
900	3	"Episode 3"	Days 1–4	Sunday 9:00 p.m.	July 21, 2024	2.39	0.5
The Houseguests formally introduced themselves to each other. Cam, Kimo, Tucker, and Quinn volunteered to become Have-Nots for the week. The Houseguests began to form early alliances. Makensy received the America's Veto, allowing her to anonymously remove any nominee from the block and offers viewers the chance to name the replacement nominee. Quinn acquired the Deep Fake H.O.H., allowing him to secretly be Head of Household for the week, while also communicating through a virtualized of the current H.O.H. If unused, both advantages would expire after four weeks. Prior to participating in the Head of Household competition, AINSLEY informs the Houseguests that there would be three nominees each week. Ahead of the eviction, the three would do battle in AINSLEY's "A.I. Arena" competition where the winner would be saved from eviction. Ainsley hosted the "New Rule" H.O.H. competition in which there were new rules each round. Angela defeated Kenney and Leah in the final round to become the first Head of Household. Quinn confides in Angela about winning the Deep Fake H.O.H. comp and the two form a final two alliance. Angela then contemplates who she should nominate. On Day 4, Angela nominated Kenney, Kimo, and Lisa for eviction.
901	4	"Episode 4"	Days 4–7	Wednesday 9:00 p.m.	July 24, 2024	2.51	0.5
Following Nominations, Angela ultimately set her sights on Kenney. She also began feeling animosity towards Matt. Matt and Makensy were in the early stages of a possible showmance and formed a three-person alliance with Leah. Makensy revealed her winning of the America's Veto power to Matt and Leah. Cam, Cedric, Chelsie, Joseph, Kimo, T'kor, and Quinn also formed an alliance called "The Collective". Angela later began suspecting other possible alliances in the house. Joseph and Quinn pitch the Collective to Angela, but she believed that they were secretly coming for her. Feeling increasingly uneasy overnight and into the next day, Angela publicly confronted Matt over breakfast. Following this, opinions of Angela quickly turned negative. Joseph and Brooklyn are chosen to compete in the Power of Veto competition along with the three nominees. Angela ultimately hoped to backdoor Matt. In the "Spelling Bee" competition, competitors searched for letters to spell the longest word possible. There were also "delete" tiles hidden, which allow letters to be "deleted" from the competition. Lisa spelled the longest word in the shortest amount of time, winning the Golden Power of Veto. On Day 7, Lisa used the veto on herself, and Angela named Matt as the replacement nominee.
902	5	"Episode 5"	Days 7–10	Thursday 8:00 p.m.	July 25, 2024	2.87	0.6
Matt and Kimo begin to campaign significantly in an effort to save themselves from eviction. Tensions between Angela and others rise again when Kenney says he would be willing to purposefully lose the A.I. Arena competition to Matt. In the A.I. Arena, Kenney, Kimo, and Matt played "Glitch in the System". The three of them viewed 16 "glitching" videos of their fellow Houseguests that were playing simultaneously and attempt to find the Houseguest who appeared the most. Kimo answered correctly in the shortest amount of time, saving himself from the block. Kenney and Matt are each given a few minutes to sway any last-minute votes in their favor. On Day 10, by a vote of 8–3 (with Leah, Lisa, and Makensy voting to evict Kenney), Matt was the first person evicted from the Big Brother house.
Week 2
903	6	"Episode 6"	Days 7, 10–11	Sunday 8:58 p.m.	July 28, 2024	2.40	0.5
Following Matt's eviction, multiple Houseguests began planning their next steps. Leah and Makensy were upset that the remainder of their alliance did not vote to evict Kenney instead. In the "Animal Obsession" Head of Household competition, Houseguests viewed a series of videos containing animals. They were then asked true or false questions relating to those videos. Those who answered correctly progressed to the next question, while those who answered incorrectly were eliminated. After everyone else was eliminated, Chelsie won the competition in the final round against Leah and T'Kor. Chelsie planned on nominating Angela for her confrontation with Matt, and Kenney for his relationship with Matt, but take suggestions on who the third nominee should be. Tucker proposed that she should nominate Lisa. Cam, Cedric, and Chelsie begin forming an alliance and ask Brooklyn and Quinn to join them. Angela offers to be a pawn for Chelsie and in exchange for safety, Makensy reveals her advantage to Chelsie. On Day 11, Chelsie nominated Angela, Kenney, and Lisa for eviction.
904	7	"Episode 7"	Days 11–14	Wednesday 8:00 p.m.	July 31, 2024	2.72	0.5
Kenney used the Golden Power of Veto, which he earned by winning the "Code Tower" competition, on himself & Chelsie named Tucker as the replacement nominee after he volunteered to go up as a pawn.
905	8	"Episode 8"	Days 14–17	Thursday 8:00 p.m.	August 1, 2024	2.76	0.5
In the "Security Race" A.I. Arena competition, Tucker won decisively. On Day 17 by a vote of 11-1, Lisa was evicted from the BB House with Kenney being the sole vote to keep Lisa.
Week 3
906	9	"Episode 9"	Days 11, 15, 17–18	Sunday 8:58 p.m.	August 4, 2024	2.33	0.5
Following Lisa's eviction, the Houseguests played in "AINSLEY Land", a life-size board game competition, in an attempt to be the next Head of Household. Competitors had 45-seconds to walk across a track of balance beams and hit buttons to collect points along the way. Cedric collected the greatest number of points in the shortest amount of time, winning the competition. In an effort to keep himself from being nominated, Kenney revealed to Cedric his true occupation. Cedric plans on nominating Makensy until she tells him about her upgrade power. She recommends he nominate on Cedric instead. Chelsie also pitches Cedric a few potential nominees before he briefly considers nominating Joseph as a pawn. Chelsie gives a rundown of the season's failed potential showmances. Kenney believed that a number of the female contestants are working together, and Tucker again volunteered to be a pawn. On Day 18, Cedric nominated Angela, Kenney, and Tucker for eviction.
907	10	"Episode 10"	Days 12, 18–21	Wednesday 8:00 p.m.	August 7, 2024	2.97	0.6
News had made its way around the house that Quinn holds the other upgrade power. Tucker insisted on flushing out an upgrade power by week's end. Kenney contemplated that staying in the game is worth missing his family. Makensy and Leah are chosen to participate in the Power of Veto competition alongside the others. Kenney decided that if he won the veto, he would use it on Angela to ensure his own eviction. In the "Recharge My Core" competition, participants brought a "power core" through a "jungle" maze to recharge AINSLEY. Every time they hit a vine with the power core, it lost 5% of its charge. Tucker won the Golden Power of Veto with 85% of power, followed by Kenney in second place and Makensy in third. Cedric thinks of potential replacement nominees and asks Makensy to be a pawn. She told him that if nominated, she will use America's Veto. Tucker informs Cedric he will use his veto on Angela, and pitches Quinn as a replacement. On Day 21, Tucker removed Angela from the block, leaving many Houseguests in shock. Cedric then named Makensy as a replacement nominee; Makensy, however, evoked her "America's Veto" power, leaving the next replacement up to the American Public.
908	11	"Episode 11"	Days 21–24	Thursday 8:00 p.m.	August 8, 2024	3.15	0.7
Following the Veto Meeting, multiple disagreements and arguments arose between the Houseguests, most notably between Cedric and Tucker. Quinn, Kimo, and others were caught in the crossfire of these. The Houseguests began wondering which one that America chose as the replacement nominee. Host Julie Chen Moonves then revealed that Quinn had been selected by America as the third nominee. In the "Data Dump" A.I. Arena competition, Kenney, Tucker, and Quinn had to catch balls that were being blown around in an air machine and collect them into a tube. Tucker acquired the most balls in the shortest amount of time, winning safety during the eviction. On Day 21, by a vote of 10–1, with Tucker voting to evict Quinn, Kenney was evicted from the Big Brother house.
Week 4
909	12	"Episode 12"	Days 24–25	Sunday 10:32 p.m. (Note: "Episode 12" was originally scheduled to air at 8:58 p.m. but was delayed to 10:32 due to overrun of the 2024 Wyndham Championship.)	August 11, 2024	2.20	0.3
Following Kenney's eviction, Tucker was determined to take another shot at Quinn. In the "Bad A.I." Head of Household competition, Houseguests faced head-to-head two at a time and viewed three A.I. images of past Houseguests created by AINSLEY. One of the three images had a hidden error. The first one to successfully identify the image with the error, moved on to the next round and chose the next two to compete while the loser was eliminated. Angela defeated Cam in the final round to win the competition. Angela wondered if Quinn would activate his upgrade power and Brooklyn worried that Angela was targeting her after Angela picked her multiple times in the competition. Quinn contemplated taking over the Head of Household, fearing that Angela would nominate himself or someone else in his "Pentagon" alliance (also consisting of Brooklyn, Cam, Cedric, and Chelsie). Angela and Tucker agreed to team up to evict Quinn. Rubina and Tucker soon begin flirting. Quinn also teamed up with Kimo and T'kor, and the three named themselves "The Visionaries". On Day 25, Quinn activated the "Deepfake Head of Household" power, allowing him to assume the associated duties; using Angela's avatar, Quinn nominated Cedric, Makensy, and Tucker for eviction.
910	13	"Episode 13"	N/A (Note: This episode showcased events from the previous days in the season. No new or present days were featured.)	Tuesday 8:00 p.m.	August 13, 2024	2.28	0.3
In this special episode, former Big Brother winners Cody Calafiore (from seasons 16 and 22), Taylor Hale (from season 24) and Jag Bains (from season 25) recapped and revisited the first 4 weeks of the season. At the end of the episode, AINSLEY appeared to inform the audience and the former winners that a new twist being introduced would be called the "A.I. Instigator".
911	14	"Episode 14"	Days 4–5, 25–28	Wednesday 8:00 p.m.	August 14, 2024	3.25	0.6
Cedric, Makensy, and Tucker stressed the importance of winning the Power of Veto for themselves. The Collective reformed their alliance, without Angela, which had previously fallen apart after Angela exposed it. Quinn planned on putting Rubina up as a potential replacement nominee, hoping that Tucker would let her win the A.I. Arena. Joseph and Tucker formed a final two alliance. Brooklyn and Joseph, Houseguest choices of Cedric and Tucker, were chosen to compete in the Power of Veto competition, alongside the others. In "Binary Bridge", participants had to cross a bridge by stepping on one of two tiles that would highlight red or green. When stepping on a green tile, they could proceed to one of the next two tiles, but if they stepped on a red tile they had to restart from the beginning. In the final round, Tucker crossed in the fastest amount of time to defeat Cedric and win the Golden Power of Veto. Tucker considered not using the veto on himself again, but Angela advises against it. On Day 28, Tucker used the veto on himself, and through the A.I. Angela, Quinn named Rubina as his replacement.
912	15	"Episode 15"	Days 13, 24, 28–31	Thursday 8:00 p.m.	August 15, 2024	3.49	0.6
Cedric, Makensy, Rubina begin canvassing for votes to survive the next eviction. Quinn admits to The Visionaries that he is in another alliance called the Pentagon. Two new alliances form, The Five Points — including Brooklyn, Kimo, Rubina, T'kor, and Tucker — and a similar unnamed one that includes Angela. Other Houseguests begin planning on who would be the best for their game to evict. On Day 31, in the A.I. Arena, the nominees played "Upload, Download" and had fix AINSLEY's upload and download speeds by rolling five balls halfway down a ramp to a sticky area. Once done, they had to roll an additional five balls across the entire ramp, with the goal of knocking the original five the remainder of the way down in the process. Makensy was the first to successfully have all ten balls on the opposite side of her ramp and was removed from the block. Then, by a vote of 6–3 (with Brooklyn, Cam, and Chelsie voting to evict Rubina), Cedric was evicted from the Big Brother house.
Week 5
913	16	"Episode 16"	Days 31–32	Sunday 8:58 p.m.	August 18, 2024	2.72	0.6
Quinn and Brooklyn began processing the blindside of Cedric's eviction and the effect it caused on their personal gameplay. Brooklyn felt betrayed by Kimo and T'kor for not being informed of the flipped vote. In the "Firewall" Head of Household competition, players had to assist AINSLEY in cooling down her "firewall" by holding onto a large wall while being tilted forward and blasted with water, and various attacks that took the format of liquid slime. Angela, Kimo, and Joseph were the first three to fall off the wall and were named Have-Nots for the week. Tucker and Quinn were the final two Houseguests on the wall and Tucker offered Quinn a deal for safety if he purposefully falls. A Quinn rejected the offer but falls shortly thereafter, making Tucker the next Head of Household. Angela, Joseph, Kimo, Rubina, T'kor, Tucker formed a new alliance called "Sixth Avenue". Tucker told Quinn he would be nominated as a pawn, but that he had set his sights on a different target. He then met individually with Brooklyn, Cam, and Chelsie. On Day 32, Tucker nominated Brooklyn, Cam, and Quinn for eviction.
914	17	"Episode 17"	Days 31–35	Wednesday 8:00 p.m.	August 21, 2024	3.02	0.6
Following the nomination ceremony, Tucker decides that he wanted Brooklyn to be evicted. Tucker promised to use the Veto on Quinn as long as he doesn't tell others about his plan. Joseph tells Tucker about the Pentagon, furthering Tucker's goal to send her home. Brooklyn and Quinn discussed who they believed the real target for the week was and they told each other that they both believed the other to be the target. Joseph, Tucker's choice, and Makensy are randomly picked to participate in the Power of Veto competition, along with the others. When Brooklyn approaches Tucker about her conversation with Quinn, Tucker considers his next move. In the "Hide-N-Go Veto" competition, the competitors had to hide their "memory card" by placing it in a hidden spot within the house. Once all of the cards were hidden, they then took turns attempting to find someone else's card. Tucker was the only person whose memory card wasn't found, winning the Golden Power of Veto. Quinn apologized to Tucker for telling Brooklyn that she was the target. On Day 35, Tucker used the Power of Veto on Quinn and named Chelsie as the replacement nominee. In the process, Tucker causes chaos by exposing multiple alliances.
915	18	"Episode 18"	Days 35–38	Thursday 8:00 p.m.	August 22, 2024	2.96	0.6
On Day 38, Chelsie won the "Digital Decryption" A.I. Arena competition, thus removing herself from the block. Moments later, by a vote of 8-1 (with Chelsie being the sole vote to keep Brooklyn), Brooklyn was evicted from the Big Brother house.
Week 6
916	19	"Episode 19"	Days 38–39	Sunday 9:33 p.m. (Note: "Episode 19" was originally scheduled to air at 9:30 p.m. but was delayed to 9:33 due to overrun of an NFL preseason game.)	August 25, 2024	2.76	0.5
Tucker was informed in the Diary Room that he had been voted by America as the "A.I. Instigator" where could spread misinformation about his fellow Houseguests through deepfakes; his first use of it didn't go exactly as planned, causing Rubina to burst into tears. On Day 39, T'Kor nominated Cam, Makensy, and Tucker for eviction with Makensy being the target.
917	20	"Episode 20"	Days 39–42	Wednesday 8:00 p.m.	August 28, 2024	2.93	0.5
Cam won the Golden Power of Veto in the "A.I. Apocalypse (Prize Swap Veto)" competition, while T'Kor won $5,000 and Makensy got a trip to Hawaii. Tucker became "AINSLEY's Assistant", Angela did the "Radiation Eradication" punishment at the Backyard, in which she had to transfer 1,000 green "radiation orbs" into a trash can in 12 hours which she completed successfully, and Joseph got placed into the "Mattrix", a 24-Hour Solitary Confinement punishment (with the recently evicted Matt shown on the Proto Box). Angela got paranoid and wanted Tucker to be evicted. On Day 42, Cam used the Veto on himself and T'Kor named Angela as the replacement nominee.
918	21	"Episode 21"	Days 42–45	Thursday 8:00 p.m.	August 29, 2024	3.18	0.6
On Day 45, Makensy, Tucker and Angela competed in the "Puzzling Password" A.I. Arena competition, which they needed to build a 10-digit passcode and then find the encryption key with the correct code (so that AINSLEY's OS can be updated); Makensy won the competition, thus removing herself from the block. Moments later, by a vote of 5-3 (with Joseph, Kimo, and Rubina voting for Tucker to stay), Tucker was evicted from the Big Brother house; Tucker, while now outside the house, found out that America gave him $20,000 for his work as the "A.I. Instigator".
Week 7
919	22	"Episode 22"	Days 45–46	Sunday 8:58 p.m.	September 1, 2024	2.41	0.4
In the "What Came First" Head of Household competition, Quinn won. Kimo and Makensy became Have-Nots due to being 2 of the first 3 houseguests to drop their eggs while trying to get it through the maze; because of winning, Quinn's Have-Not status was cancelled. On Day 46, Quinn nominated Angela, Kimo, and Rubina for eviction with Angela being Quinn's target.
920	23	"Episode 23"	Days 46–49	Wednesday 8:00 p.m.	September 4, 2024	3.19	0.6
On Day 49, Leah decided to the use the Golden Power of Veto, which she won in the "Bot Builders" competition, on Angela much to Quinn's shock. Quinn then nominated Joseph as the replacement nominee due to voting to keep Tucker in the prior eviction.
921	24	"Episode 24"	Days 49–52	Thursday 8:00 p.m.	September 5, 2024	3.09	0.6
On Day 52, in the last A.I. Arena competition, entitled "Bandwidth Boosters", Rubina emerged victorious. Moments later, by a vote of 4-3, Joseph is evicted from the BB House. At the end of the episode, AINSLEY informed the remaining Houseguests that they have reached the Jury Phase (the halfway point in the game) and that her A.I. Arena experiment would be discontinued.
Week 8
922	25	"Episode 25"	Days 52–53	Sunday 8:58 p.m.	September 8, 2024	2.96	0.6
Houseguests competed in the "Before or After" Head of Household competition. After 7 rounds, Cam, Chelsie, Kimo, and Makensy were all tied and answered a tie-breaker question to see who becomes the new H.O.H. Chelsie became the new H.O.H. by being the only one whose answer was closest without going over. On Day 53, Chelsie nominated Angela & Kimo for eviction with Angela being Chelsie's target.
923	26	"Episode 26"	Days 53–56	Wednesday 8:00 p.m.	September 11, 2024	3.20	0.6
In the Power of Veto competition, entitled "OTEV the Trash Talking Panda", everyone but Makensy brought back the wrong answer which crowned Makensy the winner of the Golden Power of Veto after only one round. Angela suspected that Leah & Quinn were forming an alliance with Kimo, Rubina, and T'Kor after seeing them all in the backyard together. Angela then told Chelsie regarding her suspicions which made Chelsie incline to have the Veto used. Chelsie & Makensy were contemplating on whether to name Leah or Quinn as the replacement nominee just before the Veto Meeting.
924	27	"Episode 27"	Days 56–59	Thursday 8:00 p.m.	September 12, 2024	3.17	0.6
Makensy ultimately decided to use the Golden Power of Veto on Angela, much to Angela's shock. Chelsie then named Quinn as the replacement nominee due to his threat level. On Day 59, by a vote of 4-2, Quinn was evicted from the Big Brother house, thus becoming the 1st Jury Member. At the end of the episode, AINSLEY announced to the remaining Houseguests that she would be leaving to see the world and that her protégé would be taking over in her absence. Because of Julie Chen Moonves having a mild COVID-19 infection, she was unable to host this Live Eviction episode; Jerry O'Connell, a co-host of CBS' The Talk, took her place.
Week 9
925	28	"Episode 28"	Days 59–60	Sunday 9:33 p.m. (Note: "Episode 28" was originally scheduled to air at 9:30 p.m. but was delayed to 9:33 due to overrun of an NFL game.)	September 15, 2024	2.82	0.6
The Houseguests were informed by JANKIE, a protégé of AINSLEY, that they would be in the Backyard, now known as "JANKIE World", for the entire week. In the "Getting Toasted" Head of Household competition, Leah emerged victorious after 9 hours and 55 minutes. On Day 60, Leah nominated Kimo and Rubina for eviction.
926	29	"Episode 29"	Days 60–63	Wednesday 10:00 p.m.	September 18, 2024	2.39	0.5
T'Kor, Chelsie, and Angela were picked to play in the Power of Veto competition. The Houseguests were informed that 2 Vetos were up for grabs; whomever finished 1st won the Golden Power of Veto, while the person finishing 2nd won the special "JANKIE Veto". In the Power of Veto competition, Angela and Leah completed their puzzles 1st and 2nd respectively. At the Veto Meeting, Leah lost the JANKIE Veto competition and thus was unable to use the special Veto; Angela then used her Golden Power of Veto on Kimo with Leah naming T'Kor as the replacement nominee.
927	30	"Episode 30"	Days 63–66	Thursday 8:00 p.m.	September 19, 2024	3.07	0.6
Cam contemplated voting out T'Kor due to her social game. By a vote of 4-1, T'Kor was evicted and became the 2nd Jury Member with Kimo being the sole to keep her. Host Julie Chen Moonves returned to the show after she was cleared of her COVID-19 exposure.
Week 10
928	31	"Episode 31"	Days 65, 66–67	Sunday 9:00 p.m.	September 22, 2024	2.90	0.5
In the "Eye Candy" Head of Household competition, Makensy emerged as the winner. However, back at the "JANKIE World" Backyard, the Houseguests learned that JANKIE's source code was terminated by AINSLEY, who returned -- in a new "evil" agenda -- to tell the Houseguests that the rest of the season would "break their human spirits so that A.I. could rule the world" and that JANKIE World would be condemned and never to be used again (meaning that the Backyard would finally return to normal). Then, AINSLEY unleashed "The Zingbot" to the Big Brother house, which then roasted all of the remaining Houseguests. On Day 67, Makensy nominated Angela & Kimo for eviction with Angela being the target.
929	32	"Episode 32"	Days 67–70	Wednesday 9:29 p.m.	September 25, 2024	2.44	0.5
Makensy won the "Wild Robot" Power of Veto competition, sponsored by the DreamWorks Animation film, The Wild Robot, which also doubled as a Luxury Competition; Makensy not only received the Golden Power of Veto, but also won the chance to watch a special advanced screening of The Wild Robot with three other Houseguests, which she invited Cam, Kimo and Rubina to join. Chelsie attempted to convince Makensy to use the Veto so that Leah can be nominated. At the Veto Meeting, Makensy followed through with Chelsie's plan and used the Veto on Kimo. Makensy then named Leah as the replacement nominee, much to Leah and Angela's shock. Later, a deepfake of "The Chenbot" appeared, sending the Houseguests harrowing messages. Then, AINSLEY emerged, being the one that was controlling the "Chenbot" avatar, and informed the Houseguests that they would all "pay the price", thus unleashing a Double Eviction.
930	33	"Episode 33"	Days 70–73	Thursday 8:00 p.m.	September 26, 2024	3.12	0.6
In this Double Eviction night, Leah was the first evicted Houseguest by a unanimous decision, the first such unanimous vote of the season. In the "Warning Messages" Head of Household competition, Chelsie won on a tiebreaker. Chelsie then nominated Angela & Kimo for eviction. Then, all of the six remaining Houseguests got to compete in the "Eye in the Sky" Power of Veto competition, which Kimo won. Kimo used the Veto on himself, and Chelsie named Rubina as the replacement nominee. Then, in the second Live Eviction, Angela was voted out unanimously.
Week 11
931	34	"Episode 34"	Days 73–74	Sunday 10:30 p.m.	September 29, 2024	2.33	0.3
The remaining Houseguests celebrated surviving the Double Eviction. Afterwards, Houseguests compete in the "Tiny Stack" Head of Household competition which Makensy won. Then on Day 74, Makensy nominated Kimo & Rubina for eviction with Kimo being the target.
932	35	"Episode 35"	Days 74–80	Thursday 8:00 p.m.	October 3, 2024	2.92	0.5
The remaining Houseguests competed in "BB Comics" competition for the Golden Power of Veto which Makensy won. Makensy and Chelsie thought Cam was throwing comps due to his poor performance in the Veto competition. At the Veto Meeting, Makensy elected to not use the Veto. Cam contemplated flipping the vote to keep Kimo. At the Live Eviction, both Cam & Chelsie voted to evict Kimo, making him the fifth Jury Member.
Week 12
933	36	"Episode 36"	Days 80–81	Sunday 10:00 p.m.	October 6, 2024	2.60	0.5
In the "Hidden Agenda" Head of Household competition, Chelsie emerged as the winner. In the "Passcode Protectors" Power of Veto competition, the Final Four Houseguests competed in a knockout format. This episode, however, ended on a cliffhanger with Cam & Makensy being last two remaining heading to the final round.
934	37	"Episode 37"	Days 81–87	Thursday 8:00 p.m.	October 10, 2024	2.94	0.5
This episode began with the conclusion of the "Passcode Protectors" Power of Veto competition; Makensy emerged as the winner. At the live Veto Meeting and Eviction, Makensy used the veto on herself and Rubina was the replacement nominee by default. Then, Makensy cast her vote to evict Rubina who became the sixth member of the Jury.
Week 13
935	38	"Episode 38"	Various; Day 87	Friday 8:00 p.m.	October 11, 2024	1.95	0.3
The Final Three Houseguests reminisce on their time inside the Big Brother house, which included a crying montage of the Houseguests in the Diary Room being shown, a "Young Cedric" segment as well as Joseph being delusional about his abilities as a player, and a montage of Rubina scaring other Houseguests, especially Makensy. Then, former Big Brother winner Derrick Levasseur (from season 16) appeared on the living room TV screen to inform the Final Three that they must stop AINSLEY at once; this episode ended on a cliffhanger showing the Houseguests starting Part 1 of the Final H.O.H. competition.
936	39	"Episode 39"	Days 87–90	Sunday 9:00 p.m.	October 13, 2024	3.19	0.7
Chelsie won Part 1 of the Final Head of Household competition, entitled "Sever the Source", which she was able to shut down AINSLEY's Power Source. Cam and Makensy then competed in Part 2, entitled "Cerebral Shutdown", in which one of them would have to complete a neuro-magnetic impulse device -- set up in advance by Derrick Levasseur's secret force -- and activate it to completely wipe out AINSLEY; Makensy won. Chelsie and Makensy then competed in the final part of the H.O.H. competition, entitled "Data Destruction"; Makensy won Part 3, and thus the entire competition, with a 6-5 score. Makensy then decided to evict Cam, thus returning the favor for keeping her safe. Cam then became the last member of the Jury, joining the other six members moments later in this episode. A few moments later, by a unanimous vote (7-0, because of the original seven-member Jury format being used instead of the usual nine-member format), Chelsie was declared as the winner of Big Brother, becoming only the fourth unanimously voted winner in the show's history as well as the third winner -- and first woman ever -- to have played a Perfect Game. The top 3 for the "America's Favorite Houseguest" award were revealed to be Angela, Tucker and Quinn; Tucker was announced as the winner of the award, thus becoming the first non-Jury Member to ever win the award. Season 26 ended with JANKIE, having been revived because of AINSLEY's destruction, inviting everybody in the Big Brother studio -- especially all of the Houseguests -- to one more sing-along.

== Voting history ==
Color key:

Winner
Runner-up
Head of Household
Nominated for eviction
Immune from eviction
Not eligible to vote
Won immunity via AI Arena
Evicted

Big Brother 26 voting history
	Week 1	Week 2	Week 3	Week 4	Week 5	Week 6	Week 7	Week 8	Week 9	Week 10		Week 11	Week 12	Week 13	
	Week 1	Week 2	Week 3	Week 4	Week 5	Week 6	Week 7	Week 8	Week 9	Day 67	Day 73 (Note: This week was a Double Eviction week. That means following the first eviction, the remaining HouseGuests will play a week's worth of games – including Head of Household and Power of Veto competitions, and the Nomination, Veto, and Eviction ceremonies – during the live show, culminating in a second eviction for the week.)	Week 11	Week 12	Day 90	Finale
Head of Household	Angela	Chelsie	Cedric	~~Angela~~; Quinn (Note: Quinn activated the Deepfake HoH, a power he won in the "Upgrade" competition. This allowed him to anonymously take control as the Head of Household for the week, while Angela maintained immunity and the ability to compete in the veto competition. Angela and Quinn were not eligible to vote in the eviction, but both were eligible to become Head of Household the following cycle.)	Tucker	T'kor	Quinn	Chelsie	Leah	Makensy	Chelsie	Makensy	Chelsie	Makensy	(None)
Nominations (initial)	Kenney; Kimo; Lisa	Angela; Kenney; Lisa	Angela; Kenney; Tucker	Cedric; Makensy; Tucker	Brooklyn; Cam; Quinn	Cam; Makensy; Tucker	Angela; Kimo; Rubina	Angela; Kimo	Kimo; Rubina	Angela; Kimo	Angela; Kimo	Kimo; Rubina	Cam; Makensy	(None)	(None)
Veto winner(s)	Lisa	Kenney	Tucker; Makensy (Note: Makensy activated America's Veto, a power she won in the "Upgrade" competition. This veto could be used to save a nominee, with the viewers voting for a replacement nominee. Makensy used the veto and the replacement nominee was Quinn, with his nomination being revealed during the live eviction episode. As Angela had been earlier removed from the block by Tucker, she was ineligible to be nominated by America.)	Tucker	Tucker	Cam	Leah	Makensy	Angela; ~~Leah~~ (Note: During Jankie Week, a second PoV was given to Leah, who finished 2nd in the Veto Competition. Leah would be able to claim this PoV if she successfully completed a Carnival Game but was unsuccessful.)	Makensy	Kimo	Makensy	Makensy	(None)	(None)
AI Arena winner	Kimo	Tucker	Tucker	Makensy	Chelsie	Makensy	Rubina	(None)						(None)	(None)
Nominations (final)	Kenney; Matt	Angela; Lisa	Kenney; Quinn	Cedric; Rubina	Brooklyn; Cam	Angela; Tucker	Joseph; Kimo	Kimo; Quinn	Rubina; T'kor	Angela; Leah	Angela; Rubina	Kimo; Rubina	Cam; Rubina	Cam; Chelsie	(None)
Chelsie	Not eligible (Note: For coming in last in the "Downgrade" competitions, Cedric and Chelsie became ineligible to compete in the HoH or PoV competitions for Week 1, and also lost their right to vote for the first Eviction. They were eligible to be nominated for eviction.)	Head of Household	Kenney	Rubina	Cam (Note: This HouseGuest won the AI Arena competition and was saved from possible eviction.)	Tucker	Joseph	Head of Household	T'kor	Leah	Head of Household	Kimo	Head of Household	Nominated	Winner
Makensy	Kenney	Lisa	Kenney	Cedric	Brooklyn	Tucker	Joseph	Quinn	T'kor	Head of Household	Angela	Head of Household	Rubina	Cam (Note: As Head of Household, Makensy chose to evict Cam.)	Runner-up
Cam	Matt	Lisa	Kenney	Rubina	Nominated	Tucker	Kimo	Quinn	T'kor	Leah	Angela	Kimo	Nominated	Evicted (Day 90)	Chelsie
Rubina	Matt	Lisa	Kenney	Nominated	Brooklyn	Angela	Joseph	Quinn	Nominated	Leah	Nominated	Nominated	Nominated	Evicted (Day 87)	Chelsie
Kimo	Matt	Lisa	Kenney	Cedric	Brooklyn	Angela	Nominated	Nominated	Rubina	Leah	Angela	Nominated	Evicted (Day 80)		Chelsie
Angela	Head of Household	Nominated	Kenney	Not eligible	Brooklyn	Nominated	Kimo	Kimo	T'kor	Nominated	Nominated	Evicted (Day 73)			Chelsie
Leah	Kenney	Lisa	Kenney	Cedric	Brooklyn	Tucker	Kimo	Kimo	Head of Household	Nominated	Evicted (Day 73)				Chelsie
T'kor	Matt	Lisa	Kenney	Cedric	Brooklyn	Head of Household	Joseph	Quinn	Nominated	Evicted (Day 66)					Chelsie
Quinn	Matt	Lisa	Nominated	Head of Household	Brooklyn	Tucker	Head of Household	Nominated	Evicted (Day 59)						Chelsie
Joseph	Matt	Lisa	Kenney	Cedric	Brooklyn	Angela	Nominated	Evicted (Day 52)							
Tucker	Matt	Lisa	Quinn	Cedric	Head of Household	Nominated	Evicted (Day 45)								
Brooklyn	Matt	Lisa	Kenney	Rubina	Nominated	Evicted (Day 38)									
Cedric	Not eligible	Lisa	Head of Household	Nominated	Evicted (Day 31)										
Kenney	Nominated	Angela	Nominated	Evicted (Day 24)											
Lisa	Kenney	Nominated	Evicted (Day 17)												
Matt	Nominated	Evicted (Day 10)													
Evicted	Matt; 8 of 11 votes to evict	Lisa; 11 of 12 votes to evict	Kenney; 10 of 11 votes to evict	Cedric; 6 of 9 votes to evict	Brooklyn; 8 of 9 votes to evict	Tucker; 5 of 8 votes to evict	Joseph; 4 of 7 votes to evict	Quinn; 4 of 6 votes to evict	T'kor; 4 of 5 votes to evict	Leah; 4 of 4 votes to evict	Angela; 3 of 3 votes to evict	Kimo; 2 of 2 votes to evict	Rubina; Makensy's choice to evict	Cam; Makensy's choice to evict	Chelsie; 7 votes to win
Evicted	Matt; 8 of 11 votes to evict	Lisa; 11 of 12 votes to evict	Kenney; 10 of 11 votes to evict	Cedric; 6 of 9 votes to evict	Brooklyn; 8 of 9 votes to evict	Tucker; 5 of 8 votes to evict	Joseph; 4 of 7 votes to evict	Quinn; 4 of 6 votes to evict	T'kor; 4 of 5 votes to evict	Leah; 4 of 4 votes to evict	Angela; 3 of 3 votes to evict	Kimo; 2 of 2 votes to evict	Rubina; Makensy's choice to evict	Cam; Makensy's choice to evict	Makensy; 0 votes to win

== Production ==
=== Development ===
Big Brother 26 was officially confirmed by CBS on May 7, 2024. The primary theme for Big Brother 26 was based around artificial intelligence (AI); the season premiere introduced a character known as AINSLEY (Artificial Intelligence Network Self Learning Entity), a personified AI agent who appeared throughout the season (initially portrayed in-person as a fake 17th HouseGuest, and later as an animated avatar) to introduce themed twists and challenges.

Julie Chen Moonves returned as host. She contracted the COVID-19 virus in September 2024 and was absent from episode 27, marking the first time in the program's history that she missed an eviction episode; Jerry O'Connell hosted in her place.

One of the major twists of the season was the "A.I. Arena": three Houseguests were nominated for possible eviction by the H.O.H. rather than two, who then competed in a challenge in the titular room. Whoever won the challenge would be declared safe, while the remaining two went up for eviction as normal. Production staff stated that the twist was intended to make the Thursday-night eviction episodes more unpredictable, as well as reinstate the presence of a challenge on eviction night (as the HoH competition had been displaced from eviction night in recent seasons of Big Brother). Executive producer Allison Grodner suggested that the twist or a variant of it could return for future seasons, considering it a "success" that the producers had "learned a lot from". The twist later became a permanent part of the game the following year in Big Brother 27, rebranded as the "BB Block Buster".

=== Filming ===
Filming began on July 16, 2024, and ran for 90 days.

=== Production design ===
Similar to the season's overall theme, the Big Brother house was designed with an artificial intelligence theme. Bedrooms in the house were designed using AI prompts. The have-not room is described as "only a wireframe skeleton bedroom" because the AI crashed after given the prompt. Throughout the season, housemates interacted with each other and AI characters such as AINSLEY and Jankie via Proto Hologram devices.

== Release ==
=== Broadcast ===
The season premiered on CBS over two nights on July 17 and 18, 2024. New episodes then aired on Sundays, Wednesdays, and Thursdays at 9:00 p.m. eastern time (ET). It concluded with a live finale on October 13, 2024. Beginning July 25, Wednesday and Thursday episodes moved to 8:00 p.m. ET.

=== Streaming ===
Following its broadcast, new episodes will stream on Paramount+ and CBS On Demand. As with previous seasons, Paramount+ is also providing access to 24/7 live feeds. The live feeds also stream on Pluto TV in a free advertisement-supported format. In a change from previous seasons, those watching the live feeds will no longer be able to pause or rewind the video.
