= Taylor Hale =

American television personality (born 1994)

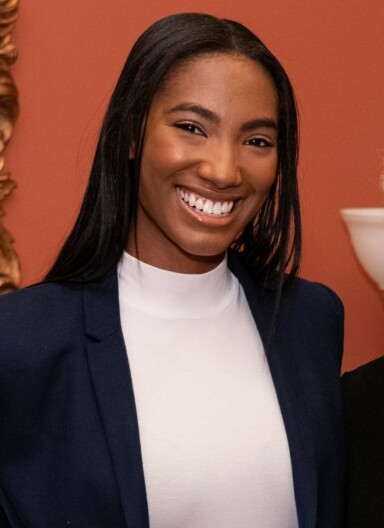
- Hale in 2019
- Born: Taylor Mackenzie Dickens Hale; December 31, 1994 (age 31); Detroit, Michigan, U.S.
- Education: George Washington University
- Occupation: Television personality
- Height: 5 ft 7 in (1.70 m)
- Beauty pageant titleholder
- Title: Miss Michigan USA 2021
- Hair color: Black
- Eye color: Brown
- Major competitions: Miss Michigan USA 2021; (Winner); Miss USA 2021; (Unplaced)

Taylor Mackenzie Dickens Hale (born December 31, 1994) is an American reality television personality and beauty pageant titleholder. She is the winner of the 24th season of the American reality television series Big Brother, becoming the first African American woman to win the series. She is also the first houseguest to win both the game and the America's Favorite HouseGuest prize.

Prior to Big Brother, she was crowned Miss Michigan USA 2021 and won Miss Congeniality at the Miss USA 2021 pageant but unplaced at the finals of the competition.

== Personal life ==
Hale was born on December 31, 1994, in Detroit, Michigan. She attended Detroit Country Day School from kindergarten through grade 12, graduating in 2013. She graduated from George Washington University in 2017, where she was a member of Alpha Phi sorority. Hale resides in West Bloomfield, Michigan.

On November 9, 2022, she confirmed her relationship with fellow Big Brother 24 contestant Joseph Abdin. They announced their breakup on April 19, 2023. Hale then dated fellow Big Brother contestant Kyland Young. The pair competed together as a couple on The Amazing Race 38. Leading up to the season, Young stated that they intentionally chose to keep their relationship private and that they were not a couple "right now".

== Miss Michigan USA ==
Hale won the Miss Michigan USA 2021 pageant in August 2021 after nearly a year-long postponement due to the COVID-19 pandemic. She did not place in the Miss USA 2021 Pageant, but she was awarded Miss Congeniality.

== Big Brother ==
=== Season 24 ===
CBS announced Hale as a Big Brother 24 HouseGuest on July 5, 2022. Hale's fellow housemates ostracized her upon entering the house, making her an early target in the game and leading to her being nominated for eviction in each of the first two weeks. Hale was also the target of comments deemed microaggressive by some viewers of the show, and disparaging remarks about her appearance and personality. During the third week, Hale joined "The Leftovers" alliance, securing her safety for the remainder of the season. Hale won two Head of Household competitions; during weeks six and eleven.

Hale was awarded the $750,000 grand prize by the season's jury, winning by a vote of 8–1 over Monte Taylor, and she became the first African American woman to win a regular season of Big Brother. She is also the first houseguest to win both the game and the America's Favorite Houseguest prize, awarding her an additional $50,000. With total cash winnings of $800,000, Hale is the second highest earning player after season 28 winner, Rick Devens.

=== Season 25 ===
Hale was interviewed for the Big Brother 25th Anniversary Celebration ahead of Big Brother 25. She later returned in the season to discuss the gameplay during Week 14's eviction episode.

=== Season 26 ===
Hale appeared on a special episode of Big Brother 26 alongside fellow winners Cody Calafiore (from seasons 16 and 22) and Jag Bains (from season 25) to look back on the first three weeks of the season and reveal the next twist. She returned later in the season, where she began taking over for fellow winner Will Kirby (from seasons 2 and 7) as the new host of the Jury Roundtable.

=== Big Brother: Unlocked ===
Hale and fellow winner Derrick Levasseur (from season 16) returned to host a new companion show, Big Brother: Unlocked. During Big Brother 27, it aired bi-weekly on Fridays beginning July 25, 2025. They were joined by mystery celebrity guests and surprise Big Brother alumni to recap the season. Both Hale and Levasseur will return to host alongside new host Jerry O'Connell for Unlocked during Big Brother 28.

=== Reindeer Games ===
In 2023, Hale returned to Big Brother to compete in the holiday spin-off season, Big Brother: Reindeer Games. She finished as the runner-up of the season.

== Filmography ==
=== Television ===
Key
†	Denotes television productions that have not yet been released

Year	Title	Role	Notes
2021	Miss USA 2021	Contestant	Miss Congeniality
2022	Big Brother 24	Contestant	Winner; America’s Favorite HouseGuest (35 episodes)
2022–2023	The Bold and the Beautiful	McKenzie	Guest star (4 episodes)
2023	Big Brother 25	Guest	25th Anniversary Celebration (2 episodes)
2023	Big Brother: Reindeer Games	Contestant	Runner-up (6 episodes)
2024	Big Brother 26	Guest	Jury Roundtable Host (2 episodes)
2025	Big Brother 27	Guest	(2 episodes)
2025	The Amazing Race 38	Contestant	Runner-up (12 episodes)
2025–2026	Big Brother: Unlocked	Host	Companion show with Big Brother
2027	The Traitors †	TBD	Season 6

Awards and achievements
Preceded by Chanel Johnson	Miss Michigan USA; 2021	Succeeded by Aria Hutchinson
Preceded by Xavier Prather	Winner of Big Brother; Season 24	Succeeded by Jagateshwar "Jag" Bains
