= Derrick Levasseur =

American television personality and private investigator (born 1984)

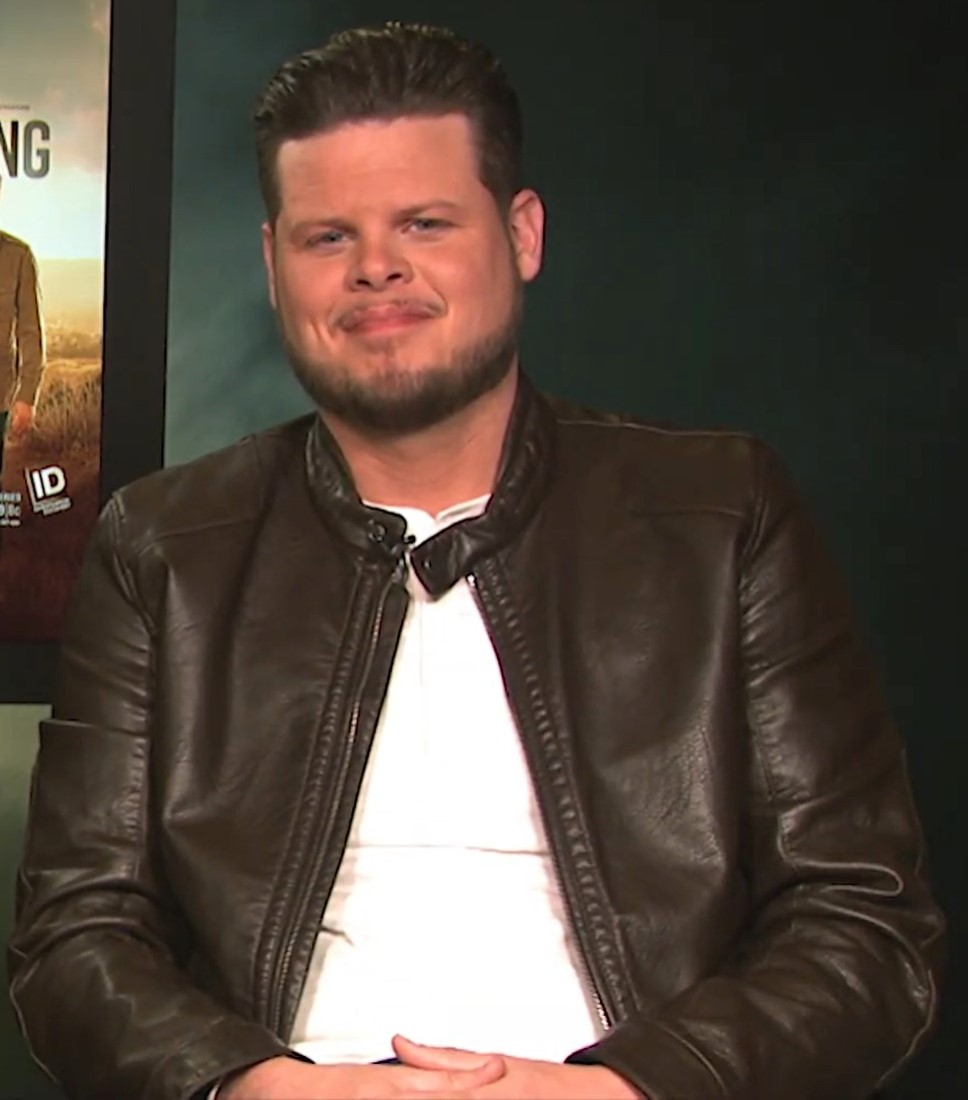
- Levasseur discusses his television program Breaking Homicide in 2018
- Born: February 3, 1984 (age 42); Providence, Rhode Island, U.S.
- Occupations: Television personality; retired police officer; private investigator
- Television: Big Brother 16 (winner); Breaking Homicide on Discovery ID; Big Brother: Unlocked
- Spouse: Jana Donlin (m. 2011)
- Children: 2

Derrick Levasseur (born February 3, 1984) is an American television personality, private investigator, and former police officer. He is best known for winning the reality television series Big Brother in 2014.

== Reality television ==
=== Big Brother ===
Levasseur competed on the sixteenth season of Big Brother USA, a competition show where the contestants, "Houseguests," compete against each other for months while being monitored 24/7. While Levasseur was an undercover detective at the time, he did not tell other houseguests, fearing they would evict him for it.

On Day 2, Levasseur formed an alliance and final two deals with fellow houseguest Cody Calafiore called "The Hitmen". Levasseur was also a member of the Team America alliance with fellow houseguests Frankie Grande and Donny Thompson, earning $75,000 by completing tasks as assigned by online voters.

Levasseur won Head of Household (HOH) in weeks 3, 8, 10, and 12. He was the sole HOH for three out of those four weeks. Levasseur was not put up for eviction until the Final Three, making him the first Houseguest to accomplish this since Danielle Reyes and Jason Guy, both of Big Brother 3.

On finale night, Calafiore won Head of Household and chose to take Levasseur to the final two. Levasseur won the game with a 7-2 jury vote, earning him $500,000. This, coupled with previously earned Team America prize money, resulted in a grand total of $575,000 for Levasseur.

=== Big Brother: Unlocked ===
Levasseur and fellow winner Taylor Hale (from season 24) returned to host a new companion show, Big Brother: Unlocked. During Big Brother 27, it aired bi-weekly on Fridays beginning July 25, 2025. They were joined by mystery celebrity guests and surprise Big Brother alumni to recap the season. Both Levasseur and Hale have returned to host alongside new host Jerry O'Connell for Unlocked during Big Brother 28.

=== Post-Big Brother ===
On March 31, 2016, Levasseur confirmed that he would be part of a Martin Sheen-produced series Hard Evidence: Is OJ Innocent on Investigation Discovery. He was one of the hosts on two seasons of Breaking Homicide on Investigation Discovery. Levasseur also co-hosts two podcasts: one about true crime called Crime Weekly with YouTuber Stephanie Harlowe, as well as one with fellow Big Brother winner Cody Calafiore called The Winner's Circle, where they analyze the current season of Big Brother. Additionally, Levasseur hosts his podcast called Detective Perspective, which is also available on YouTube.

In 2025, Levasseur competed on the third season of The Traitors. He was 'murdered' on the seventh episode.

== Professional career ==
Levasseur is a decorated police sergeant from Central Falls, Rhode Island. Hired at only twenty years old, he was one of the youngest officers in the department's history and worked in both the Patrol Division and the Detective Division. He was later assigned to the Special Investigations Unit as an undercover detective, where he had the opportunity to work with the ATF, DEA, FBI, and US Secret Service, resulting in numerous arrests and seizures. In addition to his experience in the field, he has advanced training in crime scene analysis, interview and interrogation techniques, and undercover operations.

In April 2007, while working patrol, Levasseur responded to a 911 call for help. Upon arrival, he was informed by the caller that Selvin M. Garrido Morales was attempting to stab his friend and girlfriend with a knife. When Levasseur and other officers confronted Morales, Morales proceeded to charge at the officers with a knife. Levasseur shot and killed Morales (Levasseur described it as a suicide by police). He and the other officers involved were cleared of any wrongdoing by a grand jury.

Throughout the course of his career, Levasseur received multiple awards, including letters of recognition, unit citations, commendations, and the Medal of Valor, which is the highest honor a sworn officer can receive. In 2017, he was the recipient of the American Red Cross “Hero Award” after saving seven people from a burning building.

Levasseur was a police officer for 13 years. He retired in 2017 to open his private investigation firm, Break Investigative Group.

== Filmography ==
=== Television – as self ===
Year	Title	Role	Notes
2014–2024	Big Brother	Houseguest	Season 16; 40 episodes
2014–2024	Big Brother	Guest	7 episodes
2017	Is O.J. Innocent? The Missing Evidence	Self	Mini-series
2017– 2019	The Dr. Oz Show	Guest	7 episodes
2018	Celebrity Big Brother	Guest	Episode; #1.3
2018– 2019	Breaking Homicide	Host	14 episodes
2019	Dr. Phil	Guest	Episode: "The Disappearance of Jennifer Dulos"
2023	ID Special Report: The Long Island Serial Killer	Guest	TV Special
2025	The Traitors	Contestant	7 episodes
2025–2026	Big Brother: Unlocked	Host	Companion show with Big Brother

Preceded by Andy Herren	Winner of Big Brother; Season 16	Succeeded by Steve Moses
