= Zingbot =

Fictional robot who appears annually on an American reality TV series

Zingbot 9000
- Big Brother character
- First appearance: "Episode 18" (Big Brother 12; 2010)

In-universe information
- Nickname: The Zingbot
- Species: Robot

Zingbot 9000 (formerly Zingbot 3000), colloquially known as Zingbot, is a robot visitor that is featured on the American version of the television show Big Brother, which airs on CBS. The robot has appeared on every season since the show's twelfth season in 2010, excluding the show's spin-offs, Big Brother: Over the Top and Celebrity Big Brother.

The robot, which is actually a human in a robot costume, is a form of comic relief and offers one-line insults ("zings") to each of the house guests in an annoying, mechanical sounding voice. Each insult is followed by the comment, "Zing!", which has entered the popular lexicon, particularly within the house.

== Appearances ==
Zingbot 3000 made its first appearance on Big Brother 12 during one of the Power of Veto competitions. The Zingbot 3000 also made a cameo appearance at the Big Brother 12 season finale. During Big Brother 13, its appearance coincided with a veto competition where the house guests raced to build the "Bride of Zingbot". In Big Brother 14, the theme was to build a Zingbot baby during one of the veto competitions. Zingbot 3000 attended Comic Con in 2011. Zingbot re-appeared on August 28, 2013 during Big Brother 15 and on August 20, 2014, during Big Brother 16. However, on Big Brother 17, he got an upgrade, now named the "Zingbot 9000" which had much more brutal zings on August 26, 2015. Zingbot 9000 again appeared on August 17, 2016 during Big Brother 18, and it was announced that Zingbot had entered the presidential race. Zingbot 9000 re-appeared on August 23, 2017 during Big Brother 19, having won the presidency and being modeled after President Donald Trump. In Big Brother 20, a Hide and Go veto competition was held August 22, 2018, at "Zing-a-Lago," where house guests raced to recover materials compromising to President Zing. In Big Brother 21, Zingbot returned to host the "Free the Zing" Power of Veto competition where he was put in the Zing-itentiary and the HouseGuests had to help him escape. Zingbot appeared in Big Brother 22 and onwards.
