= ABC 24 (disambiguation) =

ABC 24 usually refers to the former name of the ABC News channel, ABC News 24 in Australia.

ABC 24 may also refer to the following American Broadcasting Company (ABC) affiliates:

- KVUE in Austin, Texas
- WATN-TV in Memphis, Tennessee
- WGXA-DT2 in Macon, Georgia
- WJET-TV in Erie, Pennsylvania
- WNWO-TV in Toledo, Ohio (formerly with ABC from 1967 to 1995; now affiliated with NBC)
