= Survivor: Edge of Extinction =

- Season 38
- Region 1 DVD cover
- Presented by: Jeff Probst
- No. of days: 39
- No. of castaways: 18
- Winner: Chris Underwood
- Runner-up: Gavin Whitson
- Location: Mamanuca Islands, Fiji
- No. of episodes: 14

Release
- Original network: CBS
- Original release: February 20 – May 15, 2019

Additional information
- Filming dates: May 30 – July 7, 2018

Season chronology
- ← Previous; David vs. Goliath Next → Island of the Idols

Survivor: Edge of Extinction is the 38th season of the American competitive reality television series Survivor. Broadcast between February 20 and May 15, 2019 by CBS, the season featured eighteen contestants – fourteen new players and four returning players – initially divided into two tribes, "Kama" and "Manu". On day nine, the contestants were redivided into three tribes of five, introducing a third tribe, "Lesu". On day 17, the remaining contestants merged into one tribe, "Vata". It was filmed in the Mamanuca Islands of Fiji from May 30 to July 7, 2018.

The season introduced the Edge of Extinction twist, a game mechanic that offered eliminated contestants an opportunity to remain in the game. Upon being voted out, players were given the option to be eliminated or go to the Edge of Extinction, a desolate island with minimal supplies and harsh living conditions. There, they awaited a chance to re-enter the main game through a challenge held at two designated points – the final 12 (day 17) and the final five (day 35). The contestants in the main game were initially unaware of this twist, only being revealed to them before the first re-entry challenge. Every contestant on the Edge of Extinction after the first re-entry challenge was granted a seat on the jury.

After 39 days, Chris Underwood won the title of Sole Survivor and the prize of US$1,000,000, defeating Gavin Whitson and Julie Rosenberg in a 9–4–0 jury vote. The season received generally negative critical reception primarily due to the Edge of Extinction twist, which was criticized for imbalanced editing. Underwood's victory was also controversial, as he became the first Survivor winner to win the game after being voted out earlier in the season.

== Overview ==
Survivor is a reality television show based on the Swedish show Expedition Robinson, created by Mark Burnett and Charlie Parsons. The series follows a number of participants isolated in a remote location, where they must provide food, fire, and shelter. One by one, a participant is removed from the series by majority vote, with challenges held to give a reward (ranging from living- and food-related prizes to a car) and immunity from being voted out of the series. The last remaining player receives a prize of $1,000,000.

== Production ==
Survivor: Edge of Extinction was filmed in the Mamanuca Islands of Fiji between May 30 and July 7, 2018. The Manu tribe lived on Monuriki. It broadcast between February 20 and May 15, 2019.

This season introduced a new feature wherein contestants who are voted out have an option to take a boat to the titular "Edge of Extinction" rather than leave the game permanently. The Edge of Extinction is a desolate, abandoned beach with even fewer amenities than the main island: contestants on the Edge of Extinction may either wait for an opportunity to re-join the main game or may choose to leave the game at any point by raising a white sail. Castaways on the Edge of Extinction were given regular correspondence by way of coded maps and letters, which led to the location of daily rice rations and advantages in the game. The remaining contestants were initially unaware of this twist; it was officially revealed at the tribal merge, at which point the remaining Edge of Extinction castaways competed in a challenge with the winner returning to the game. The losing castaways were given the opportunity to remain on the Edge of Extinction and, from that point on, all remaining Edge of Extinction inhabitants went to each Tribal Council as members of the jury. This is the most recent season to have the winner reveal and the reunion special taking place live.

Host Jeff Probst explained that the "Edge of Extinction" concept was the result of a goal to "try to get a little deeper psychologically, a little deeper spiritually," asking contestants, "is there a possibility of the spiritual death and rebirth that you seek in life, where you realize something deeper about yourself?"

=== Casting ===
This season featured 14 new players and four returning players, the first season since Survivor: Blood vs. Water (11 seasons prior) to feature a mix of both new and returning players. According to host Jeff Probst, the decision to bring back returning players was made as a response to the Edge of Extinction concept to illustrate the difficulties of the game, stating, "Once we landed on Extinction, what stood out to me is we're asking people to go further than they've ever gone before in a game that's already very difficult. Let's bring reminders of how difficult it is. We're going to bring four returning players that are going to remind you."

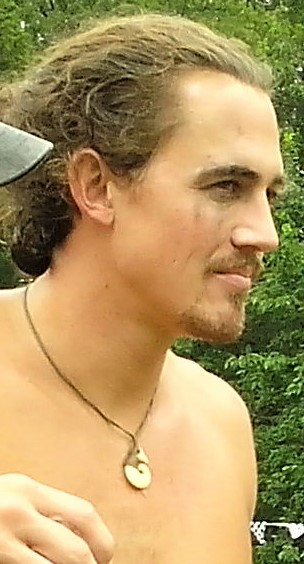
Joe Anglim

As such, producers ultimately cast four returning players for this season: Joe Anglim from Worlds Apart and Cambodia, Aubry Bracco from Kaôh Rōng and Game Changers, Kelley Wentworth from San Juan del Sur and Cambodia, and David Wright from Millennials vs. Gen X. Probst said the four were chosen due to each representing different styles of gameplay. Before the season began filming, the returnees were separated from the new players. The returnees were split up, as Anglim and Bracco were separated from Wentworth and Wright, with each pair being unaware of each other. This was because they were eventually cast on different tribes. Benjamin “Coach” Wade from Tocantins, Heroes vs. Villains, and South Pacific was also asked back by producers but ultimately turned down the offer, saying he felt it was a waste to play on a season with newbies. Wade would later return, along with Bracco, to compete on Survivor 50: In the Hands of the Fans.

== Contestants ==
The cast is composed of 18 players split into two tribes, "Kama" and "Manu." On Day Nine, the contestants were redivided into three tribes of five, introducing a third tribe, "Lesu." On Day 17, the remaining contestants merged into one tribe, "Vata." Notable castaways include WGXA-TV news anchor Rick Devens and nationally acclaimed schoolteacher/author Ron Clark.

List of Survivor: Edge of Extinction contestants
Contestant	Age	From	Tribe			Main game (Note: Elimination order is based on when the contestant was voted out at Tribal Council.)		Edge of Extinction	
Contestant	Age	From	Original	Switched	Merged	Finish	Day	Finish	Day
Reem Daly	46	Ashburn, Virginia	Manu			1st voted out 1st jury member (Note: For lasting on the Edge of Extinction through to the first Tribal Council after the merge, Reem, Chris, and Aubry joined the jury on Day 19; Chris left the jury when he returned to the game on Day 35.)	Day 3	Lost challenge	Day 35
Keith Sowell	19	Durham, North Carolina	Manu			2nd voted out	Day 6	Left game by raising sail	Day 17
Chris Underwood (Returned to game)			Manu			3rd voted out Removed from jury	Day 8	2nd returnee	Day 35
Rick Devens (Returned to game)			Manu	Lesu		4th voted out	Day 11	1st returnee	Day 17
Aubry Bracco Kaôh Rōng & Game Changers	32	Los Angeles, California	Kama	Manu		5th voted out 2nd jury member	Day 13	Lost challenge	Day 35
Wendy Diaz	25	Bell, California	Manu	Manu		6th voted out	Day 16	Left game by raising sail	Day 17
Joe Anglim Worlds Apart & Cambodia	29	Ogden, Utah	Kama	Kama	Vata	7th voted out 3rd jury member	Day 19	Lost challenge	Day 35
Eric Hafemann	34	Livermore, California	Kama	Manu	Vata	8th voted out 4th jury member	Day 22	Lost challenge	Day 35
Julia Carter	25	Bethesda, Maryland	Kama	Kama	Vata	9th voted out 5th jury member	Day 23	Lost challenge	Day 35
David Wright Millennials vs. Gen X	44	Sherman Oaks, California	Manu	Lesu	Vata	10th voted out 6th jury member	Day 25	Lost challenge	Day 35
Kelley Wentworth San Juan del Sur & Cambodia	32	Seattle, Washington	Manu	Lesu	Vata	11th voted out 7th jury member	Day 27	Lost challenge	Day 35
Dan "Wardog" DaSilva	38	Los Angeles, California	Manu	Lesu	Vata	12th voted out 8th jury member	Day 29	Lost challenge	Day 35
Ron Clark	45	Atlanta, Georgia	Kama	Kama	Vata	13th voted out 9th jury member	Day 31	Lost challenge	Day 35
Aurora McCreary	32	Orlando, Florida	Kama	Kama	Vata	14th voted out 10th jury member	Day 34	Lost challenge	Day 35
Victoria Baamonde	23	Bronx, New York	Kama	Manu	Vata	15th voted out 11th jury member	Day 36		
Lauren O'Connell	21	Waco, Texas	Manu	Lesu	Vata	16th voted out 12th jury member	Day 37		
Rick Devens	33	Macon, Georgia	Manu	Lesu	Vata	Eliminated; 13th jury member	Day 38		
Julie Rosenberg	46	New York, New York	Kama	Kama	Vata	2nd runner-up	Day 39		
Gavin Whitson	23	Erwin, Tennessee	Kama	Manu	Vata	Runner-up	Day 39		
Chris Underwood	25	Greenville, South Carolina	Manu	None (Note: Chris was not assigned a tribe during the tribe switch due to being on Edge of Extinction.)	Vata	Sole Survivor	Day 39		

=== Future appearances ===
Aubry Bracco and Rick Devens returned to compete on Survivor 50: In the Hands of the Fans, with Aubry going on to win the season.

Outside of Survivor, Chris Underwood competed on the second season of The Challenge: USA in also which he became a male winner. Devens competed on season 28 of Big Brother in which he won.

== Season summary ==
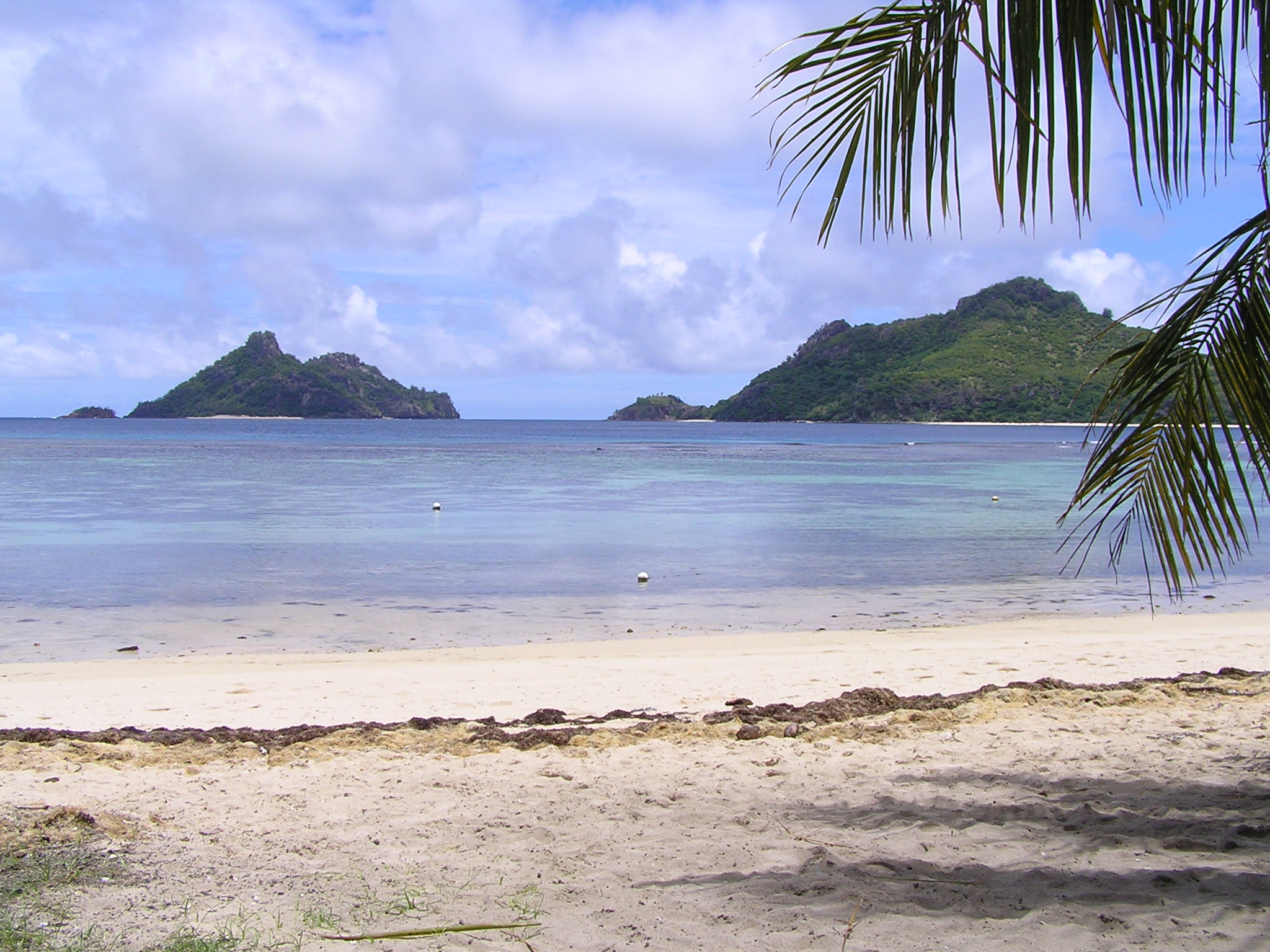
The season filmed in the Mamanuca Islands of Fiji.

The 14 new players and four returning players were divided into two tribes of nine: Kama and Manu. At Kama, the new players aligned against returnees Aubry and Joe but avoided Tribal Council, while at Manu, returnees David and Kelley struck up an uneasy truce to control early votes, aided by their respective closest allies, Rick and Lauren. After the tribe swap, Aubry was voted out, while Kelley turned on David to eliminate Rick. Players who were voted out were given a chance to head to a secluded island, the Edge of Extinction, for a chance to return to the game; at the merge, Rick won a competition and rejoined the game.

After the merge, the Kama majority alliance voted out Joe before turning on each other, leading to a series of short-term coalitions to eliminate common threats, including David and Kelley. Rick emerged as the biggest remaining target, but stayed in the game after winning immunity challenges and playing hidden immunity idols. Wardog was the strategic force of the old Manu alliance, while Ron was the strategic force of the old Kama alliance, which caused both to get blindsided by an emerging four-person alliance of Lauren, Victoria, Aurora, and Gavin. However, Lauren then led the charge to blindside Aurora, and then Victoria, both for being big threats to win.

When five players remained, Chris, who had been on the Edge of Extinction since Day 8, won the final re-entry challenge and returned to the game. Chris convinced Lauren to play her hidden immunity idol on him, successfully played an idol on himself and won the final immunity challenge to earn a spot at the final Tribal Council, only to give up his immunity so he could face Rick in the fire-making challenge; Chris defeated Rick to join Julie and Gavin at the Final Tribal Council.

At the Final Tribal Council, Julie was largely ignored due to playing with her emotions, and not strategy. She explained her case saying she had tight bonds with Ron and others and said she was the reason why Julia was sent home. Gavin was praised for his social game, effective use of the Extra Vote, and his immunity wins, but playing a relatively safe strategic game, with no big moves. Chris said that even though he was only in the game for 13 days, he made big moves by opting to go into the fire-making challenge, use of multiple idols, and making great social bonds with the people on Edge of Extinction. Because of this, Chris won in a 9–4–0 vote over Gavin and Julie.

Challenge winners and eliminations by episodes
Episode			Challenge winner(s)		Eliminated	
No.	Title	Original air date	Reward	Immunity	Tribe	Player
1	"It Smells Like Success"	February 20, 2019	Kama		Manu	Reem
2	"One Of Us Is Going To Win The War"	February 27, 2019	Kama		Manu	Keith
3	"Betrayals Are Going to Get Exposed"	March 6, 2019	Manu	Kama	Manu	Chris
4	"I Need a Dance Partner"	March 13, 2019	None	Kama	Lesu	Rick
4	"I Need a Dance Partner"	March 13, 2019	None	Manu	Lesu	Rick
5	"It's Like the Worst Cocktail Party Ever"	March 20, 2019	Kama	Kama	Manu	Aubry
5	"It's Like the Worst Cocktail Party Ever"	March 20, 2019	Manu	Lesu	Manu	Aubry
5	"It's Like the Worst Cocktail Party Ever"	March 20, 2019	Kama	Kama (Note: Only one tribe won the immunity challenge. The other two tribes went to Tribal Council together to eliminate a single player.)	Manu	Wendy
5	"It's Like the Worst Cocktail Party Ever"	March 20, 2019	Manu	Kama	Manu	Wendy
6	"There's Always a Twist"	March 27, 2019	Rick (Note: Returned to the game upon winning the Edge of Extinction challenge.)	Julie	Vata	Joe
7	"I'm the Puppet Master"	April 3, 2019	Aurora, Eric, Julia, Rick, Wardog, Victoria	Aurora	Vata	Eric
8	"Y'all Making Me Crazy"	April 10, 2019	None	Gavin	Vata	Julia
9	"Blood of a Blindside"	April 17, 2019	None	Aurora	Vata	David
9	"Blood of a Blindside"	April 17, 2019	Gavin, Kelley, Lauren [Julie] (Note: There was an unaired reward challenge in this episode.)	Rick	Vata	Kelley
10	"Fasten Your Seatbelts"	April 24, 2019	Julie, Lauren, Rick, Wardog	Rick	Vata	Wardog
11	"Awkward"	May 1, 2019	Ron [Gavin, Julie]	Gavin	Vata	Ron
12	"Idol or Bust"	May 8, 2019	Gavin [Victoria, Lauren]	Rick	Vata	Aurora
13	"I See The Million Dollars"	May 15, 2019	Chris	Julie	Vata	Victoria
13	"I See The Million Dollars"	May 15, 2019	Julie [Chris, Lauren]	Julie	Vata	Victoria
13	"I See The Million Dollars"	May 15, 2019	None	Rick	Vata	Lauren
13	"I See The Million Dollars"	May 15, 2019	None	~~Chris~~ [Gavin, Julie] (Note: For winning the final Immunity Challenge, Chris had to assign additional immunity to another player, with the remaining two competing in a fire-making challenge to determine the third finalist; Chris chose to give up his immunity to save Gavin and Julie, and competed against Rick in the fire-making challenge.)	Vata	Rick
14	"Reunion Special"	May 15, 2019				

== Episodes ==
No. overall	No. in season	Title	Rating/share (18-49)	Weekly rank	Original release date	U.S. viewers (millions)
555	1	"It Smells Like Success"	1.6/7	15	February 20, 2019	7.75
The season began with 14 new players split into two tribes, Kama and Manu, and introduced the four returning players: Aubry and Joe joined Kama, while David and Kelley joined Manu. After a brief scramble for supplies, Ron from Kama found a clue to an "Advantage Menu," offering him a choice of one of three powers usable before the third Tribal Council: stealing a reward, an extra vote, or individual immunity. At Kama, Joe impressed his tribe by making fire without flint. However, Eric and Gavin bonded over their desire to target returning players, specifically Aubry due to her strategic prowess on her previous seasons. On Manu, Kelley and Lauren grew close, and Wendy disclosed that she has Tourette syndrome. Reem bonded with Keith and Wendy, helping Keith learn to swim, but her controlling behavior alienated the rest of the tribe. In the Reward/Immunity Challenge, tribes tackled an obstacle course and slide puzzle. Kama won immunity and flint. Back at Manu, Reem attempted to target Kelley and Lauren but faced backlash for her attitude. Keith ultimately sided with the majority, and at Tribal Council, the tribe split votes between Reem and Wendy. Reem was voted out, becoming the first eliminated. After her elimination, Reem was given an opportunity to remain in the game; she accepted the offer and was sent to the Edge of Extinction.
556	2	"One of Us is Going to Win the War"	1.5/7	14	February 27, 2019	7.07
On the Edge of Extinction, Reem explored the barren locale. On Manu, Wendy continued targeting Kelley, while David and Rick aligned and considered joining her efforts. Kelley led an open search for a hidden immunity idol to block Wendy, unaware that her closest ally Lauren secretly found it. At Kama, Aubry's efforts to bond with the new players fell flat, with Julia, Ron, and Victoria viewing her as inauthentic. Julie tried leading a women's idol hunt to improve gender representation in idol finds. In the Reward/Immunity Challenge, players retrieved a 400-pound snake containing number discs, which unlocked rings for a paddle toss. Kama won immunity again and chose fishing gear as their reward. Keith was blamed for the loss due to his struggles with both swimming and ring-tossing. Keith pledged loyalty to Chris, convincing him to join himself, David, Rick, and Wendy against Kelley. However, Wardog urged Chris to vote out Keith instead to preserve tribe strength and keep bigger targets around. At Tribal Council, the tribe voted out Keith. After the vote, Keith pondered the decision to remain in the game.
557	3	"Betrayals Are Going to Get Exposed"	1.5/6	14	March 6, 2019	7.25
Keith ultimately chose to remain in the game and joined Reem on the Edge of Extinction. The next morning, they discovered a map leading up a long staircase to a small supply of rice, realizing the daily climb would be their only way to eat. In the Reward Challenge, tribes assembled a wheelbarrow, maneuvered it through obstacles, and converted it into a slingshot to knock down targets. Despite Wendy injuring her ankle, Manu won their first challenge and chose chickens as their reward. Back at camp, Wendy plotted to free the chickens but was limited by her injury. Meanwhile, at Kama, the six new players (excluding Aurora) aligned against Aurora, Joe, and Aubry. Aubry found a hidden immunity idol. The Immunity Challenge had tribes pulling a boat to retrieve keys, then using them to solve a complex ship's wheel puzzle. Kama won again, sending Manu back to Tribal Council. Tensions rose at Manu after Wendy hid the flint to stop the chickens from being cooked. David and Rick attempted to blindside Kelley with Chris and Wendy's help, but when Chris warned Wardog, Wardog flipped the plan and targeted Chris for being untrustworthy. Frustrated with Chris, David and Rick joined the vote against him. Chris was voted out and chose to go to the Edge of Extinction.
558	4	"I Need a Dance Partner"	1.5/7	13	March 13, 2019	7.53
At the Edge of Extinction, Chris faced tension from Reem and Keith for his role in voting them out. However, he earned their respect by catching fish for the group. On Manu, Wendy emerged as the next target after continuing to plot the chickens' release, despite returning the stolen flint. At a tribe swap, players were reorganized into three tribes: Aurora, Joe, Julia, Julie, and Ron remained on Kama; Aubry, Eric, Gavin, Victoria, and Wendy formed the new Manu; and David, Kelley, Lauren, Rick, and Wardog became the new Lesu tribe, forced to build a new camp from scratch. At Kama, Joe and Aurora sought to align with Ron, but Ron secretly worked with Julia and even searched Joe's bag for a hidden idol. Over at Manu, Wendy revealed everything about her original tribe and eventually freed the chickens, angering her new tribemates. At Lesu, Lauren fell ill and stopped eating. In the Immunity Challenge, tribes scaled A-frames and solved a puzzle. Kama and Manu won, sending Lesu to Tribal. Kelley and Lauren targeted Rick as a social threat, while David and Rick pushed to vote out Lauren for her sickness. Wardog became the swing vote and sided with Kelley and Lauren, eliminating Rick, who chose to go to the Edge of Extinction.
559	5	"It's Like the Worst Cocktail Party Ever"	1.3/6	8	March 20, 2019	7.05
In a Reward Challenge, Kama and Manu won sandwiches and supplies. Joe's continued contributions made Ron question voting him out. At Manu, Eric, Gavin, and Victoria targeted Aubry, with Victoria pretending to ally with her. On Lesu, Wardog pushed Kelley to consider voting out Lauren due to her illness. At the Edge of Extinction, castaways found coded maps to advantages. Though they agreed to explore together, Keith went ahead; Chris wrestled him for one advantage, a practice kit for the re-entry challenge, while Rick found the other, an anonymous extra vote he could send to someone in the game, which he sent to Aubry. In the Immunity Challenge, Kama and Lesu won. Aubry, misled by Victoria, was blindsided and voted out without playing her idol or extra vote. She joined the Edge of Extinction. In another Reward Challenge, Kama won pastries and Manu won cookies. Joe worried he was next and tried bonding with Julia. At Lesu, Wardog continued to push against Lauren, frustrating Kelley. A new Edge of Extinction map led to a penalty advantage, which Keith found, aided by Reem. In the next Immunity Challenge, Kama won again, forcing Manu and Lesu to attend a joint Tribal Council. To maintain numbers, Manu tried to flip David, while Lesu targeted Wendy. Kelley found an idol and learned Lauren had one too. At Tribal, the vote tied between Wendy and Lauren. On the revote, Manu and Lesu united to unanimously eliminate Wendy, who went to the Edge of Extinction. The next day, all Edge castaways were summoned to return to the game.
560	6	"There's Always a Twist"	1.6/8	9	March 27, 2019	7.75
The day following the joint Tribal Council, the tribes merged into the Vata tribe, and the Edge of Extinction twist was revealed. The six Edge castaways competed in a challenge to return. Keith used his advantage to penalize Chris with 30 extra knots. In the obstacle course, players built a pole to retrieve a key, then maneuvered a ball up a vertical maze. Rick won, re-entering the game. After Vata left, the remaining Edge players were offered the chance to stay for a second re-entry challenge; all accepted, but Keith and Wendy later quit. As a reward, Rick received a hidden immunity idol split into two powerless halves, he gave one to David. If both survived the next vote, the idol would become active. Kelley, Lauren, and Wardog pushed to target Rick again, seeking help from Joe and Aurora. However, Julie was appalled at the plan to send Rick back out so soon. In the Immunity Challenge, castaways balanced a tiki statue on a vertical pole while standing on narrowing beams. Julie won. Back at camp, she targeted Kelley and warned Rick. Ron, concerned by Joe's challenge threat level, pushed the Kama Six to vote him. At Tribal Council, the Edge of Extinction players became jury members. The Kama Six blindsided Joe, sending him to the Edge.
561	7	"I'm the Puppet Master"	1.5/7	15	April 3, 2019	7.41
After Joe's blindside, Aurora felt betrayed by the Kama Six but considered staying aligned with them. Meanwhile, Kelley, Lauren, and Wardog aimed to form a new majority with Aurora, David, and Rick. However, David and Rick had allied with Kama leaders Ron and Eric for long-term safety. In the Reward Challenge, two teams retrieved puzzle pieces from the water and solved a puzzle; Aurora, Eric, Julia, Rick, Wardog, and Victoria won Chinese takeout. At camp, David agreed to work with Kelley's group again, but Rick, angry over being voted out by them, refused and stuck with Kama. On the Edge of Extinction, Aubry found a practice kit for the re-entry challenge and an extra vote to assign anonymously. In the Immunity Challenge, players balanced a block on their heads under a frame. Lauren fainted during the challenge but recovered after medical assistance. Aurora won immunity and found Aubry's gifted extra vote. The Kama Six, plus Aurora, David, and Rick, planned to split votes between Kelley and Lauren. Wardog, sensing a power shift, warned Gavin and Julia that Ron and Eric were using David and Rick as future shields. Julia's confrontation with Eric prompted a deeper rift, and she, Gavin, and Victoria flipped. At Tribal Council, they joined Kelley's alliance and David to blindside Eric, who was sent to the Edge of Extinction.
562	8	"Y'all Making Me Crazy"	1.5/7	7	April 10, 2019	7.59
After being excluded from Eric's blindside, Julie and Ron sought to rejoin the Kama alliance. Julie confided in Ron and Rick that she believed Julia was running the game and likely to win. Gavin aimed to merge his group (Julia and Victoria) with Kelley, Lauren, and Wardog, to target David, though Julia hesitated aligning with another tight-knit trio. Meanwhile, David and Rick reconciled and reformed their alliance with Julie and Ron. In the Immunity Challenge, castaways balanced a ball on a bow while standing on a narrow beam. Gavin won. Kelley's group pushed to switch the target from David to Ron, but Julia tried to reunite Kama and shift the target to Kelley, frustrating Gavin. The Kama group's secretive behavior raised red flags for both David and Kelley's alliances. At Tribal Council, tension erupted into chaotic whispering and shifting plans. Rick proposed that Lesu, Julie, and Ron unite to vote out Julia or Aurora, accusing them of dominating the game. Though Wardog initially aimed for Aurora, Julie insisted on targeting Julia. Wardog then led a last-minute shift. David handed Rick his idol half; Rick played the completed idol on David. The tribe ultimately blindsided Julia, sending her to the Edge of Extinction.
563	9	"Blood of a Blindside"	1.5/8	5	April 17, 2019	7.89
Wardog formed a new majority alliance with Gavin, Julie, Lauren, Kelley, and Ron, targeting Aurora, blaming her for Julia's elimination. Before the immunity challenge, some castaways were tempted by a pizza reward to sit out. Lauren, Kelley, Victoria, and Ron accepted the offer. In the Immunity Challenge, castaways squatted over an urn of water above a fire. Standing too tall or too low would eliminate them. Aurora won immunity, so Wardog's alliance shifted their target to David. David and Rick countered by targeting Wardog and tried rallying Aurora, Julie, Victoria, and Ron. Julie and Ron became swing votes. At Tribal Council, David was voted out and joined the Edge of Extinction. At the Edge, castaways received a new clue. David deciphered it and found an advantage to gift a remaining player for the next immunity challenge; he chose Rick. In the challenge, castaways maneuvered balls down a paddle with dimples. Rick, needing only four balls due to his advantage, won immunity. Though the plan was to vote out Aurora, Wardog shifted gears and targeted Kelley, the last returning player. He secured support from Aurora, Rick, Ron, and Victoria. Aurora gave Ron her extra vote to build trust. At Tribal Council, Wardog's plan succeeded, and Kelley was blindsided and went to the Edge of Extinction, where she revealed that both she and Lauren had idols.
564	10	"Fasten Your Seatbelts"	1.5/7	10	April 24, 2019	7.50
After Tribal Council, Gavin confronted Wardog about being left out of the plan to blindside Kelley, causing tension and prompting Gavin to target Wardog. Rick proposed forming an alliance with Ron and Wardog, viewing them as the biggest threats, while Ron and Julie reconciled after previously voting separately. For the Reward Challenge, castaways split into two teams of four for a ring toss challenge involving swimming, underwater retrieval, and ring tossing on floating pegs. Julie, Lauren, Rick, and Wardog won. During the reward, Julie and Lauren considered aligning against Wardog, though Lauren saw Rick as a bigger threat. Back at camp, Ron returned an extra vote to Aurora, but they clashed over rice rations, while Victoria and Gavin discussed voting out Rick before Wardog. The Immunity Challenge involved racing over frames while holding buoys, maneuvering through a rope tunnel, and crawling under a net to collect keys unlocking puzzle pieces. Rick won immunity, disrupting the majority's plan. Gavin started rallying votes against Wardog, who plotted with Julie, Rick, and Ron to target Aurora. At Tribal Council, Wardog was voted out and sent to the Edge of Extinction.
565	11	"Awkward"	1.4/7	10	May 1, 2019	7.34
After Tribal Council, Rick confronted Ron for lying about the plan against Wardog. To mend fences, Ron gave Rick the Advantage Menu he found during the marooning, though Rick didn't know it had expired. Before the Reward Challenge, castaways reunited with loved ones. In the challenge, pairs tossed buckets of ocean water to fill a seesaw. Ron won, choosing to share the picnic with Gavin, Julie, and their loved ones. Feeling threatened, Rick searched for a hidden immunity idol. Aurora snooped through his bag but was caught. That night, Rick found a clue revealing the idol's location, a tree above camp, and retrieved it in secret. The immunity challenge tested balance on footrests against walls, supported by armrests. Gavin won immunity. With the tribe united against Rick, contingency plans formed in case he played an idol. Julie and Ron told Rick to vote Aurora, assuring him the Advantage Menu was valid. Victoria and Lauren planned to split votes between Rick and Ron, while Aurora gave her extra vote to Gavin for a tiebreaker safeguard. At Tribal Council, the split vote went ahead. Rick tried using the expired Advantage Menu for immunity but was denied, so he played his idol on himself, negating four votes against him. With Rick immune, Ron was voted out and sent to the Edge of Extinction.
566	12	"Idol or Bust"	1.5/7	11	May 8, 2019	7.28
Rick found a second hidden immunity idol. At the Reward Challenge, castaways shot balls into an overhead track, raced through obstacles, and then placed the balls on narrow perches. Gavin won and chose Lauren and Victoria to join him, leaving Aurora feeling isolated from the alliance. During the reward, Lauren considered keeping Julie for the endgame, viewing her as an easier opponent to beat. The Immunity Challenge had castaways sliding lettered discs through slots, transporting them on balance beams, and solving a word puzzle. Rick won immunity. Lauren attempted to convince Gavin to vote out Aurora over Julie, as she felt she had a better shot beating Julie in the end then Aurora. She was willing to vote Aurora without Victoria's knowledge, but Gavin wouldn't commit without Victoria, who was unsure about leaving Julie and Rick both in the game together and also felt that Lauren was secretly working with Julie. At Tribal Council, Rick revealed his idol and threatened to play it for Julie to sway votes. However, when votes were cast, he held onto the idol, and the majority voted out Aurora and sent her to the Edge of Extinction.
567	13	"I See The Million Dollars"	1.5/7	11	May 15, 2019	7.21
The second and final Edge of Extinction re-entry challenge saw Chris win, returning to the game while the other Edge castaways were eliminated. Chris and Rick reconnected. Chris revealed to Lauren that he knew about her idol. At the combined Reward/Immunity Challenge, Julie won and took Chris and Lauren, making Rick suspicious of Julie's loyalty. During the reward, Chris shared that the Edge castaways, who made up the jury, viewed Rick and Victoria as biggest threats, prompting Lauren to plan Victoria's blindside. Victoria plotted to work with Rick, believing Julie and Lauren would realize they had a better chance against Chris in the end over her or Gavin. Rick revealed his idol to Chris, who gave him half of the powerless two-part idol to empower it. Chris convinced Lauren to play her idol on him to impress the jury. At Tribal Council, Rick and Lauren played their idols, negating votes against Rick and Chris, respectively, and Victoria was eliminated. The next day, Rick found another idol and planted fake idols, fooling Julie and Lauren. Rick also gave Chris his half of the two-part idol, activating it. Rick won the next Immunity Challenge, and with Chris, targeted Lauren, believing she was the biggest strategic threat. Rick made a deal with Gavin for final tribal support in exchange for his idol. Chris played his idol on himself, and Lauren was voted out. Chris won the final Immunity Challenge and chose to face Rick in the fire-making challenge. Chris won, sending Rick to the jury. At Final Tribal Council, Gavin was praised for his social game, Julie was critiqued for emotional gameplay, and Chris was noted for his strong late-game moves despite spending most of his game on the Edge of Extinction.
568	14	"Reunion Special"	0.9/4	N/A	May 15, 2019	4.64
At the live reunion show, Chris was named the Sole Survivor in a 9–4–0 jury vote over Gavin and Julie, respectively. The castaways then reunited to discuss the season with Jeff Probst.

== Voting history ==
	Original tribes			Switched tribes				Merged tribe											
Episode	1	2	3	4	5			6	7	8	9		10	11		12	13		
Day	3	6	8	11	13	16 (Note: On Day 16, a joint Tribal Council was held where the two tribes that lost immunity voted together to eliminate one player.)		19	22	23	25	27	29	31		34	36	37	38
Tribe	Manu	Manu	Manu	Lesu	Manu	Manu		Vata	Vata	Vata	Vata	Vata	Vata	Vata		Vata	Vata	Vata	Vata
Eliminated	Reem	Keith	Chris	Rick	Aubry	Tie (Note: The first Tribal Council vote resulted in a tie. Per the rules, a second vote was held where the castaways involved in the tie could not vote and the remaining castaways could only vote for the two tied.)	Wendy	Joe	Eric	Julia	David	Kelley	Wardog	Ron		Aurora	Victoria	Lauren	Rick
Votes	4–3–1–1	6–1–1	5–2	3–2	4–1	4–4	6–0	6–3–2–2	8–2–2	9–1–0 (Note: Rick played a hidden immunity idol on David; therefore, one vote against David was not counted.)	8–2	5–4	6–2	3–1–0 (Note: Rick played a hidden immunity idol on himself, therefore four votes against him were not counted.)		5–1	2–0–0 (Note: Rick played a hidden immunity idol on himself and Lauren played a hidden immunity idol on Chris; therefore, three votes against Rick and one vote against Chris were not counted.)	2–0 (Note: Chris played a hidden immunity idol on himself; therefore, three votes against him were not counted.)	None (Note: For winning the final Immunity Challenge, Chris had to assign additional immunity to another castaway, with the remaining two competing in a fire-making challenge to determine the third finalist; Chris chose to give up his immunity to save Gavin and Julie (the latter of whom was bequeathed the immunity necklace), and defeated Rick in the fire-making challenge.)
Voter	Vote																		Challenge
Chris	Reem	Keith	Kelley														Victoria	Lauren	Won
Gavin					Aubry	Lauren	Wendy	Joe	Eric	Julia	David	Aurora	Wardog	Ron	Ron (Note: This player played an extra vote advantage, allowing them to cast two votes.)	Aurora	~~Rick~~	~~Chris~~	Saved
Julie								Joe	Lauren	Julia	David	Aurora	Wardog	~~Rick~~		Aurora	~~Rick~~	~~Chris~~	Immune
Rick	Reem	Keith	Chris	Lauren				Kelley	Lauren	Julia	Wardog	Kelley	Aurora	Aurora		Aurora	Victoria	Lauren	Lost
Lauren	Wendy	Keith	Chris	Rick		Wendy	None (Note: This player was not eligible to vote in the second round of voting.)	David	Eric	Julia	David	Aurora	Wardog	Ron		Aurora	~~Rick~~	~~Chris~~	
Victoria					Aubry	Lauren	Wendy	Joe	Eric	Julia	David	Kelley	Wardog	~~Rick~~		Aurora	~~Chris~~		
Aurora								Rick	Eric	~~David~~	David	Kelley	Wardog	~~Rick~~		Julie			
Ron								Joe	Kelley	Julia	David	Kelley	Wardog	~~Rick~~					
Wardog	Wendy	Keith	Chris	Rick		Wendy	Wendy	David	Eric	Julia	David	Kelley	Aurora						
Kelley	Wendy	Keith	Chris	Rick		Wendy	Wendy	David	Eric	Julia	David	Aurora							
David	Reem	Keith	Chris	Lauren		Wendy	Wendy	Kelley	Eric	Julia	Wardog								
Julia								Joe	Eric	Kelley									
Eric					Aubry	Lauren	Wendy	Joe	Kelley										
Joe								Rick											
Wendy	Lauren	Kelley	Kelley		Aubry	Lauren	None												
Aubry					Wendy														
Keith	Reem	Wendy																	
Reem	Kelley																		

Jury vote
Episode	14		
Day	39		
Finalist	Chris	Gavin	Julie
Votes	9–4–0		
Juror	Vote		
Rick		Yes	
Lauren		Yes	
Victoria	Yes		
Aurora		Yes	
Ron	Yes		
Wardog	Yes		
Kelley		Yes	
David	Yes		
Julia	Yes		
Eric	Yes		
Joe	Yes		
Aubry	Yes		
Reem	Yes		

== Reception ==
Survivor: Edge of Extinction received negative reviews due to the poorly balanced editing, the Edge of Extinction twist, and the abundance of idols and advantages at the end of the season that helped contribute to the controversial outcome in Chris Underwood, who was voted out on Day 8 and didn't return to the game until Day 35, being crowned the champion of the season. While Underwood was praised for his gameplay in the final few days of the game, his win was controversial due to his early elimination, resulting in him not being involved in the elimination of the majority of the players due to his position on the Edge of Extinction.

Survivor blogger and former contestant Stephen Fishbach spoke negatively about the season, stating about Underwood's victory, "On paper, it seems impossible, even insulting. The signature challenge of Survivor is, how do you vote people out of the game in such a way that they're willing to vote for you to win. Chris didn't have to do any of that. Rather than having to betray his tribemates, Chris spent a month feeding them, healing wounds and building bonds. And what does that mean about the past 10 episodes of the show? Were they all just a pointless waiting room for Chris's march to victory?" Fishbach also panned the editing at the conclusion of the season, as many of the cast members received less screen time than the four returning players, Devens, and at the finale, Underwood.

Dalton Ross of Entertainment Weekly also criticized the season's editing and casting, as well as the eventual winner. According to Ross, "Rick Devens was the only true breakout from the cast...but that may also be because so much of the attention early was spent on the four returning players." Ross spoke of Chris's victory, "It's so hard to know what to make of Chris as a winner. He was voted out, only played 13 out of 39 days, and had what other players said was a 'monumental' advantage of getting to become friends with the entire jury in a non-game setting...doesn't really seem fair." Ross ranked the season 29th out of 38 (at the time); as of the conclusion of the 40th season, it is now ranked 30th out of 40.

Leigh Oleszczak of Surviving Tribal wrote, "There was a lot wrong with Survivor: Edge of Extinction... They tried it once and it gave us not only one of the worst seasons ever but the worst winner ever." Andy Dehnart of Reality Blurred also panned the season and its finale, stating, "If you want a shoddily produced game with no coherent rules, just lots of signs that the producers are twisting the game into shapes because they don't understand or care about game design, there are plenty of other options. One of them starts next month on CBS and is called Big Brother." Daniel George of Surviving Tribal also lambasted the Edge of Extinction twist, giving seven reasons why it was a failure in his review of the season. However, the twist would later be used again two seasons and a year later, where it received high praise for the returning contestant despite criticizing it for the return.

In 2020, Survivor fan site "Purple Rock Podcast" ranked this season 26th out of 40 saying that the "gimmick employed here always seemed destined for failure." Later that same year, Inside Survivor ranked this season 33rd out of 40 saying that the Edge of Extinction twist "ultimately makes the whole season feel empty and pointless."

In 2021, Rob Has a Podcast ranked Edge of Extinction 36th out of 40 during their Survivor All-Time Top 40 Rankings podcast. Despite the highly negative responses to the season, Survivor once again led the country in the key 18-49 demographic and second overall in viewers during its timeslot.

In 2024, Nick Caruso of TVLine ranked this season 37th out of 47.
