= Big Brother 28 (American season) =

Big Brother: Time Trip
- Season 28
- Promotional poster for Big Brother 28
- Hosted by: Julie Chen Moonves
- No. of days: 87
- No. of houseguests: 17
- Winner: Rick Devens
- Runner-up: Taylor Brown
- America's Favorite HouseGuest: Rick Devens
- Companion show: Big Brother: Unlocked
- No. of episodes: 41 (including Unlocked)

Release
- Original network: CBS
- Original release: July 9 – October 1, 2026

Additional information
- Filming dates: July 7 – October 1, 2026

Season chronology
- ← Previous; Season 27

Big Brother 28 (also known as Big Brother: Time Trip) is the twenty-eighth season of the American reality television program Big Brother. The program is an adaptation of the franchise created in 1999 by John de Mol Jr.. The season featured a time travel theme. It premiered on CBS on July 9, 2026, and concluded on October 1, 2026.

Rick Devens won the season, defeating Taylor Brown by a jury vote of 6–1, making him the first Survivor contestant to win Big Brother. Devens also won America's Favorite HouseGuest, the second winner to do so after Taylor Hale on Big Brother 24.

== Format ==
Big Brother follows a group of contestants, known as HouseGuests, who live inside a custom-built house outfitted with cameras and microphones recording their every move 24 hours a day. The HouseGuests are sequestered with no contact with the outside world. During their stay, the HouseGuests share their thoughts on their day-to-day lives inside the house in a private room known as the Diary Room. Each week, the HouseGuests compete in competitions in order to win power and safety inside the house. At the start of each week, the Houseguests compete in a Head of Household (abbreviated as "HOH") competition. The winner of the HoH competition is immune from eviction and selects three HouseGuests to be nominated for eviction.

Six HouseGuests are then selected to compete in the Power of Veto (abbreviated as "PoV") competition: the reigning HoH, the nominees, and other players selected by random draw. The winner of the PoV competition has the right to either revoke the nomination of one of the nominated HouseGuests or leave them as is. If the veto winner uses this power, the HoH must immediately nominate another HouseGuest for eviction. The PoV winner is also immune from being named as the replacement nominee.

On eviction night, the three nominated HouseGuests compete in the BB Block Buster competition to be immediately removed off the block. The two remaining HouseGuests face the house vote for possible eviction.

All HouseGuests vote to evict one of the nominees, though the Head of Household and the nominees are not allowed to vote. This vote is conducted in the privacy of the Diary Room. The nominee with the most votes is evicted from the house. In the event of a tie, the Head of Household publicly casts the tie-breaking vote in front of their fellow HouseGuests. The last seven evicted HouseGuests comprise the Jury and are sequestered in a separate location following their eviction. The Jury is only allowed to see the competitions and ceremonies that include all of the remaining HouseGuests; they are not shown any interviews or other footage that might include strategy or details regarding nominations. Once there are only two remaining HouseGuests, the Jury will vote between the two to pick the season's winner. The viewing public is able to award an additional prize by choosing "America's Favorite HouseGuest", with the award being worth $50,000. All Houseguests are eligible to win this award except for those who either voluntarily leave or are forcibly removed for rule violations.

=== Format changes and additions ===
A new twist known as the "BB Time Capsule" was introduced in the second week; through the seventh week, a HouseGuest determined by a weekly viewer vote will be sent into the eponymous room to attempt a challenge; if they are successful, they will earn a power reprised from a previous season of Big Brother. If unsuccessful, they will likewise receive a punishment from a past season. Each HouseGuest is only eligible to win the vote once. The "BB Block Buster" also returned.

== HouseGuests ==
The cast of the twenty-eighth season of Big Brother. Top: Lyric, Kamu, Dee, Barrett, Ashley, Drew, Angela and Yash Second row: Chuk, La Trice, Melody, Mallory and Haley Bottom: Jason, Rome, Devens and Taylor

The initial cast of 14 contestants was revealed on July 7, 2026. Among the HouseGuests is Jason De Puy, a drag queen who performs under the stage name Salina EsTitties, who competed on the fifteenth season of RuPaul's Drag Race and the eleventh season of RuPaul's Drag Race All Stars. A few other HouseGuests had made previous appearances on reality television: Drew Campbell, son of rock guitarist and singer-songwriter Buzz Campbell, previously appeared on season one of Beast Games, Let's Make a Deal, America Says, The Hot Seat, and The Price Is Right, Lyric Medeiros, daughter of American singer Glenn Medeiros, appeared on season 21 of American Idol, and Yash Patel appeared on The Quiz with Balls in 2025. Around the same time, Campbell was also one of fifty finalists to compete on Wonka's The Golden Ticket, but was not chosen as a contestant.

Entertainment Weekly later revealed Survivor: Edge of Extinction and Survivor 50: In the Hands of the Fans castaway Rick Devens would be competing on the season. Former Big Brother 26 contestant Angela Murray was also announced to be participating on the season. During the first episode of Big Brother: Unlocked, Survivor 45 winner, The Challenge: Vets & New Threats contestant, and Survivor 50: In the Hands of the Fans castaway Dee Valladares was announced as the final HouseGuest of the season.

Men's Journal had erroneously reported that Levi Banks, a 28-year-old winery executive from Pilot Mountain, North Carolina was set to compete on the season. Through his personal Instagram account, Banks revealed that he voluntarily withdrew before entering the house.

Name	Age	Occupation	Residence	Result
Rick Devens	42	Communications director	Macon, Georgia	Winner; Day 87
Taylor Brown	27	School counselor	Deerfield Beach, Florida	Runner-up; Day 87
Drew Campbell	22	Surgical dental assistant	Temecula, California	Evicted; Day 87
Dee Valladares	29	Entrepreneur	Miami, Florida	Evicted; Day 80
Melody Morris	24	Corporate game show host	Phoenix, Arizona	Evicted; Day 77
Yash Patel	24	Finance analyst	Monroe Township, New Jersey	Evicted; Day 73
Barrett Pfeiffer	27	Jumbotron engineer	Austin, Texas	Evicted; Day 73
Angela Murray Big Brother 26	52	Real estate agent	Syracuse, Utah	Evicted; Day 66
La Trice Verrett	57	Boutique salesperson	Maplewood, New Jersey	Evicted; Day 59
Haley Thogmartin	29	Telemedicine executive	Wildwood, Missouri	Eliminated; Day 53
Mallory Aurichio	24	Rocket scientist	Washington Township, New Jersey	Evicted; Day 52
Kamuela "Kamu" Kirk	32	MMA fighter	Phoenix, Arizona	Evicted; Day 45
Chuk Anyanwu	27	Supply chain analyst	Dallas, Texas	Evicted; Day 38
Lyric Medeiros	25	Attorney	Honolulu, Hawaii	Evicted; Day 31
Jason De Puy	35	Drag queen	Los Angeles, California	Evicted; Day 24
Jack "Rome" Seymour	28	Pickleball coach	Delray Beach, Florida	Evicted; Day 17
Ashley Trail	24	Bartender	Chicago, Illinois	Evicted; Day 10

== Episodes ==
No. overall	No. in season	Title	Day(s)	Timeslot (ET)	Original release date	U.S. viewers (millions)	Rating (18–49)
Week 1
976	1	"Episode 1"	Day 1	Thursday 8:00 p.m.	July 9, 2026	3.88	0.9
Fourteen new HouseGuests move into the Big Brother House. Julie Chen Moonves revealed that none of them would become the season's first Head of Household. To begin the game, the HouseGuests were told they would be traveling through time to retrieve three remaining HouseGuests, all of whom were reality TV icons. To earn safety, the fourteen players were instructed by Enzo Palumbo, creator of Meow Meow Enterprise, to searched the House for BBtomium, which would earn them the opportunity to compete for safety. The BBtonium had different equations on them. Houseguests must find Palumbo on the memory wall and see which number he is holding and find the BBtonium that adds up to the correct number. Ashley and Barrett were the only two HouseGuests who did not earn the chance to compete in the second challenge to earn safety. HouseGuest then had to divide into three groups of four where one HouseGuest from each group would earn safety. The first group, La Trice, Mallory, Kamu, and Rome, traveled back to July 9, 1988. In the first Safety Competition, each HouseGuest was tasked with placing eight pieces of "radial merchandise" onto an unsteady display rack. Each item had a different weight and must be carefully arranged to keep the rack balanced. The first HouseGuest to successfully balance all eight items and press their buzzer earned safety. Rome successfully balanced all items and won immunity for the week. As his reward, he delivered the first letter, bringing Big Brother 26 houseguest Angela Murray into the game. The second group, Taylor, Chuk, Drew, and Haley, traveled to July 7, 2018, where they competed in a Survivor-inspired challenge. In the second Safety Competition Part 2, each HouseGuest had to make their way across a river using only two planks of different lengths. By strategically placing and repositioning the planks one at a time, it would created a path to the opposite side. The first HouseGuest to successfully reach the other side earned safety. Chuk won the competition and delivered the next letter to Jeff Probst, bringing Survivor contestant Rick Devens into the game. The final group, Yash, Melody, Lyric, and Jason, traveled back to June 27, 2010. In the third Safety Competition Part 3, each HouseGuest must listen to a series of audio clips before answering questions by choosing between three possible responses: Bahama Mama, Fuzzy Navel, or Purple Hooter. After each question, the HouseGuest who buzzed in last would be eliminated from the competition. The final remaining player won safety for the week. Jason won the challenge and successfully brought Big Brother winner Rachel Reilly into the game. For the first Head of Household competition, the entire cast traveled back to 175 million BC. Before the competition, Rachel met her untimely demise after falling into a volcano, forcing Julie to travel to December 20, 2023, to retrieve her replacement.
977	2	"Big Brother: Unlocked 7/10/26"	Day 1 (Note: This episode also showcased events from preseason interviews.)	Friday 8:00 p.m.	July 10, 2026	2.35	0.4
In Big Brother: Unlocked, Survivor 45 winner Dee Valladares entered the game. Former Big Brother winners Derrick Levasseur and Taylor Hale then used the dining table time machine to travel to fifteen minutes prior to Rachel's untimely demise in 175 million BC to save her from her fate. After returning to the present, Derek, Taylor and Rachel were joined with Jerry O'Connell to recap and revisit the first night of the season. Featured segments included "Missing Moments", "Cirie's Survival Tips", and "Something Surprising". The episode concluded with Angela, Dee, and Devens competing to become the season's first Head of Household.
978	3	"Episode 3"	Days 1–4	Sunday 8:00 p.m.	July 12, 2026	2.92	0.6
For the first Head of Household competition, each reality icon was assisted by the four new players who brought them into the game. As Rachel's replacement, Dee inherited Rachel's group of four HouseGuests. In the Head Of Household Competition, each group of four newbies stood on a boulder and used ropes to support a suspended stacking platform while their icon assembled a fire-themed puzzle. If the puzzle fell or the platform touched the ground the player had to restart from the beginning. The first HouseGuest to complete the puzzle would become the first Head of Household, while the group with the fewest correct puzzle pieces on their platform at the end of the competition would become the season's first Have-Nots. Dee won the competition, becoming the first Head of Household. As a result, Devens' group, consisting of Chuk, Drew, Haley, and Taylor, finished with the fewest pieces on their platform and became the first Have-Nots of the season. After her victory, Dee celebrated with Angela, who shared advice on how to handle the responsibilities of being the Week 1 Head of Household. Meanwhile, Chuk, Kamu, and Haley quickly formed a strong bond. Dee and Devens also had a conversation to put aside their differences following Survivor 50: In the Hands of the Fans. Wanting to protect one another while strengthening their positions in the game, they first aligned with Kamu, Chuk, and Haley to create an alliance called "The Red Corner". They then brought in Angela, Barrett, and Drew to form a different alliance known as "The Crossovers". Elsewhere in the house, Rome and Lyric began flirting, and their growing connection quickly became noticeable to the other players. As nominations approached, Dee decided it would be fairest to nominate one player from each of the three time-travel groups. Kamu was skeptical of the plan, arguing that Dee should not nominate someone from the group that had helped her become Head of Household and tried to convince her to nominate Barrett instead. On Day 4, Dee stuck with her original plan and nominated Mallory, Taylor, and Yash for eviction.
979	4	"Episode 4"	Days 4–7	Wednesday 8:00 p.m.	July 15, 2026	3.29	0.7
Following the first Nomination Ceremony of the season, Yash feels betrayed by Dee after helping her win the Head of Household competition. Taylor knows she needs to remain calm, while Mallory feels hurt and upset by her nomination. The HouseGuests become wary of Mallory’s emotional reaction, questioning whether her response could make her a bigger target. The Icons celebrate together, with Dee identifying Yash as her main target while keeping Mallory as a potential backup option. Melody and Lyric begin questioning whether they should distance themselves from Mallory to avoid becoming associated with her. Meanwhile, Rome and Lyric grow even closer, sharing more intimate moments and strengthening their bond. During the Veto Draw, Barrett and Melody were selected to compete alongside the three nominees and Dee. In the Power of Veto Competition ("Back From the Future"), each HouseGuest must help future Howie Gordon defeat future Will Kirby by constructing a path between the "Table Time Machine" and Will's throne using a series of tubes. The route must pass through all eleven amplifier rings before reaching the throne. The first HouseGuest to successfully connect the entire course won the Golden Power of Veto. Mallory ultimately finished first, winning the first Power of Veto competition of the summer. Jason begins to confide in Angela, playing up his emotions in an attempt to get her on his side. However, after he confides with Melody and Drew, the information gets back to Angela. Drew also informs Devens that Jason may be targeting him in the near future. With Jason safe for the week, Dee continues trying to make strategic decisions that benefit her game. She considers nominating Barrett or Ashley as replacement nominees, as neither were included in a group on the first night. On Day 7, Mallory uses the Power of Veto on herself, and Dee nominates Ashley as her replacement, keeping her promise to nominate at least one person from each original group.
980	5	"Episode 5"	Days 7–10	Thursday 8:00 p.m.	July 16, 2026	3.30	0.7
Dee continues to push for Yash to be the first evicted, fearing that he could target her in the future and rally the rest of the guys from her alliance. Taylor feels safe regardless of the outcome of the upcoming BB Block Buster. The HouseGuests begin to notice a tight alliance forming between Kamu, Haley, and Chuk, with the Icons also appearing to be closely aligned with them. Angela grows suspicious that Rome may be gathering numbers against their side of the house, while Rome begins forming a close alliance with La Trice and Jason. Ashley attempts to campaign for her safety by approaching Melody, claiming that other side are votes to keep her. This information gets back to Drew and the rest of his alliance, causing them to become concerned about Ashley's gameplay and intentions. In the BB Block Buster Competition ("Do Over"), nominees must scan a series of images featuring their fellow HouseGuests with hairstyles from different eras. They must correctly identify the HouseGuest who appears in the most images within two minutes. The first HouseGuest to submit the correct answer wins the Block Buster, leaving the remaining two nominees on the block. Yash secures the win, leaving Ashley and Taylor as the final nominees for the week. On Day 10, Ashley is unanimously evicted from the Big Brother house.
Week 2
981	6	"Episode 6"	Days 5, 10–11	Sunday 8:00 p.m.	July 19, 2026	3.11	0.6
Following the unanimous vote, most HouseGuests felt uneasy as the vote did not reveal where the house alliances stand. In the Head of Household Competition ("Achy Breaky HOH"), HouseGuests must slide a disk down a table, attempting to land it on the highest-scoring numbered spots. The competition was played in three rounds, with a new rule introduced for each round. In the first round, HouseGuests were paired up and competed against their partner. In the second round, pairs remained together but attempted to eliminate another pair by earning the highest combined score. In the final round, the remaining HouseGuests competed individually, with the player achieving the highest solo score winning the competition. Devens scored the highest and became the second Head of Household. Rome confided in Devens, hoping to protect his side of the house and the people closest to him. He named Jason and Lyric as his two closest allies. Angela privately pulled Devens aside and pushed him to nominate those two close allies, with Rome as the backdoor target. Later that night, a large group consisting of members from "The Red Corner" and "The Crossovers" come together to form an eight person alliance called "The Toolshed." Angela is voted to enter the BB Time Capsule. Her attempt to gain a power is unsuccessful, as she earned the "Hard Boiled-Detective" punishment from Big Brother 27. On Day 11, Devens nominated Jason, Lyric, and Melody for eviction. Before the nomination ceremony can adjourn, an argument broke out between Jason and Angela.
982	7	"Episode 7"	Days 11–14	Wednesday 8:00 p.m.	July 22, 2026	3.18	0.6
Jason and Angela publicly go head-to-head during the nomination ceremony. Angela informs the HouseGuests that Jason has been playing on her emotions to gain sympathy and further his game. Haley and Devens also reveal to the girls that Jason has been manipulating them as well. Rome's betrayal is then brought to light, exposing his role in the situation. Melody, La Trice, and Lyric are left blindsided and hurt. Rome to apologize to La Trice as he felt forced to narrow down his list of allies. Meanwhile, Devens and Dee celebrate successfully blowing up the house with his nominations. During the Veto draw, Rome's backdoor plan is set in place as Angela and Barrett are selected to compete alongside the nominees and Devens. In the Power of Veto Competition ("Flower Power"), HouseGuests must find and retrieve twelve hidden puzzle pieces. Once they have collected all their pieces, they must assemble the pieces inside their frame. The first player to complete their puzzle wins the Golden Power of Veto. Devens wins the competition and the Power of Veto. Rome and Lyric attempt to distance themselves in hopes of no longer being viewed as a dangerous "showmance". Lyric approaches Devens and promises that if he were to remove her from the block, she would not target him in the coming weeks. Drew, however, pushes Devens to use the Veto on Melody instead, causing Devens to question where Drew's true loyalties lie. On Day 14, Devens uses the Power of Veto to save Lyric and nominates Rome in her place.
983	8	"Episode 8"	Days 14–17	Thursday 8:00 p.m.	July 23, 2026	3.52	0.8
Melody is hurt that Devens chose not to use the Veto on her but feels slightly more secure now that Rome is sitting beside her on the block. Lyric continues to flirt with Chuck and Yash, though the HouseGuests remain skeptical that she and Rome have truly ended their relationship. The HouseGuests begin to notice another potential showmance forming between Melody and Drew, further convincing Dee and Angela that he may not be fully loyal to their side of the house. In the BB Block Buster Competition ("Pirate's Booty"), nominees must maneuver colored gemstones, aiming to sort four stacks by color by only moving one gem at a time. The first HouseGuest to correctly sort their gems and hit their buzzer will win the Block Buster, leaving the remaining two nominees on the block. Jason wins the Block Buster, leaving Melody and Rome as the final nominees for the week. On Day 17, Rome is evicted from the Big Brother house by a vote of 12–1 with Taylor being the sole vote to evict Melody. Note: Big Brother: Unlocked surprise guest Ross Matthews joins Julie Chen Moonves on stage to discuss the season.
Week 3
984	9	"Big Brother: Unlocked 7/24/26"	Day 17, Various (Note: Flashbacks included clips from previous Days in the house)	Friday 8:00 p.m.	July 24, 2026	1.74	0.2
The episode opened with the fallout of the second eviction. Former Big Brother winners Derrick Levasseur and Taylor Hale, along with Jerry O'Connell, were joined by Ross Matthews to recap and revisit the first two weeks of the season. They are also joined by recent evictee Rome. Featured segments included "Missing Moments", "BB Bad Ass/Dumb Ass", "The Rant Room", "Creator Corner" and "Something Surprising". O'Connell entered the BB Time Capsule and revealed the powers and punishments that are up for grabs. The episode concluded with the HouseGuests beginning the third Head of Household competition, "Wrestlegasm".
985	10	"Episode 10"	Days 17–18	Sunday 8:00 p.m.	July 26, 2026	3.31	0.6
The house begin to question who cast the rogue vote for Melody. Lyric insisted that she was not the one who voted to keep her. Drew and Barrett realize they are at the bottom of both of their alliances and want to keep their options open moving forward. Before the Head of Household competition, Angela is informed that her egg punishment has officially ended. In the Head of Household Competition ("Wrestlegasm"), The HouseGuests must answer a series of true or false questions about a live wrestling match performed in the backyard, featuring an appearance from former Big Brother HouseGuest Jessie Godderz. If a player answers incorrectly, they are eliminated from the competition. The last HouseGuest remaining would win the HoH competition. Kamu wins and becomes the new Head of Household. Kamu wanted to target two strong competitors in hopes of making a strong move. Drew and Kamu formed the "Handymen" alliance, and Kamu immediately voiced that Jason and Mallory were his targets. However, he still needed a third nominee. Angela suspected that Drew was the rogue vote and began stirring up trouble, but she and Dee both felt it was too soon to target him. Kamu informed Lyric that she was safe that week and that he did not want to nominate her. Devens is voted to enter the BB Time Capsule. His attempt to gain a power is successful, as he earned the "Diamond Power of Veto" power first seen on Big Brother 4. He keeps his power a secret from the house but only informs Dee that he won. Before nominations, Drew approached Kamu to make sure he did not nominate Jason immediately, as it would give him another opportunity to win safety. Kamu told Jason that he did not want to put him up "today." After the conversation, Jason began to feel that he was being treated similarly to how Rome had been treated the previous week. Kamu then had to go back on his word to Lyric, as he needed someone to serve as a pawn. On Day 18, Kamu nominated La Trice, Lyric, and Mallory for eviction.
986	11	"Episode 11"	Days 18–21	Wednesday 8:00 p.m.	July 29, 2026	3.29	0.6
Though Lyric is upset with Kamu for nominating her, she reassures him to make him feel comfortable in case she does not win the Power of Veto or Block Buster. Jason knows he is the target and hopes that he would be selected to compete in the veto competition. Meanwhile, the houseguests question who has the power, as no one has received a punishment. Drew and Kamu debate whether Kamu should nominate Jason or keep him off the block. During the Veto Draw, Haley and Jason were selected to compete alongside the three nominees and Kamu. Jason tells each nominee that he would use the veto on them if he won, while also assuring Kamu that he would not use it. In the Power of Veto Competition ("The Pickle Ball"), each HouseGuest must go head-to-head against another competitor. They need to spin on a giant pickle for one minute before attempting to score the highest number of points by hitting balls into numbered slots. After five rounds, the HouseGuest with the highest score would win the Golden Power of Veto. Lyric beats Mallory in the final round and wins the Power of Veto. Jason attempts to create chaos in the house by informing Dee that he wants to protect the Icons while targeting Haley, Chuk, and Kamu in the future. He then approaches Chuk and reveals that he would like to go after the three "icons". However, both trios quickly learn about Jason's plans. Kamu decides to expose Jason's messy gameplay during Mallory's planned tea party. Jason then begins to go around the house informing Kamu of any and all strategic gameplay talk between by banging a tea kettle. On Day 21, Lyric uses the Power of Veto to save herself, and Kamu nominates Jason as the replacement nominee.
987	12	"Episode 12"	Days 21–24	Thursday 8:00 p.m.	July 30, 2026	3.47	0.7
The house immediately begins planning out different scenarios for the final outcome. Mallory’s allies, Melody and Lyric, campaign to gather the votes needed to keep her over La Trice and Jason. They attempt to pull in Yash, Drew, and Barrett, while also discussing the possibility of keeping Jason if he remains on the block against La Trice. Drew and Barrett find themselves caught in the middle, as "The Toolshed" alliance would want either Mallory or Jason out this week. The alliance members begin discussing Drew and Barrett's true loyalties and where they stand with them, especially after Drew campaigns for Mallory. Taylor continues to waver back and forth on whether she is willing to vote against La Trice. In the BB Block Buster Competition ("Video Tape Tumble"), nominees must attempt to retrieve video tapes placed on a wobble tower. Players can rearrange the tower as they collect the tapes, but if a tape touches the ground or their tower falls, their current score is locked in. The player who successfully deposits the most tapes wins safety. Mallory wins the Block Buster, leaving Jason and La Trice as the final nominees for the week. On Day 24, Jason is evicted from the Big Brother house by a unanimous vote of 12–0.
Week 4
988	13	"Episode 13"	Days 24–25	Sunday 8:00 p.m.	August 2, 2026	3.43	0.7
Following Jason's eviction, the HouseGuests prepare for the next Head of Household competition. While waiting, Mallory, Melody, and La Trice discuss how Haley has been rude and snarky toward them and several other HouseGuests. Meanwhile, the other members of the Toolshed begin questioning Drew's loyalty, believing he has been playing a floater game. In the Head of Household competition ("Jack The Ripper"), HouseGuests are given five minutes to study six rooms before answering questions about the items they observed. In the final round, Haley answers correctly and defeats Yash to become the new Head of Household. Haley and Devens celebrate her Head of Household victory while also discussing Taylor's comments following her win. Later, Haley calls out the other women for remarks they have made about her over the past three weeks. La Trice tells Haley that Melody and Mallory have been speaking negatively about her. Dee is voted to enter the BB Time Capsule. Her attempt to earn a power is successful, as she wins the "BB Bribe" power, which was first seen on Big Brother 18. Haley confront Melody to which Melody owns up to and let her know it was true that she would have put her up on the block. Haley later questions Barrett and Drew in the hopes of nominating one of the men as a pawn. On Day 25, Haley nominates Drew, Melody, and Taylor for eviction.
989	14	"Episode 14"	Days 25–28	Wednesday 8:00 p.m.	August 5, 2026	3.18	0.6
The three nominees are upset with Haley's nominations. Drew believes he is simply a pawn, though other members of his "Toolshed" begin to conspire against him. Meanwhile, Taylor senses that she is Haley's true target. Later, Drew begins to tell Devens that he would target the "Red Corner" if he were to win Head of Household the following week. Following going into the "BB Time Capsule", Dee continues to keep her power a secret, even from Devens. Lyric tries to grow closer to the other side of the house by throwing her allies under the bus, to which Haley questions. Elsewhere, Dee lets Barrett know that the target has shifted to Drew, causing Barrett to worry that he could be next. However, he does not inform Drew of the danger. During the Veto Draw, Chuk and Mallory were selected to compete alongside the three nominees and Haley. Morgan Pope from Big Brother 27 visits the house to host the Veto Competition. In the competition ("Murder at the Masquerade"), players must randomly present two glasses of wine, one poisoned and one safe, to a chosen target, who must then guess which glass is safe. Any HouseGuest who drinks poison twice is eliminated. In the final round, Chuk drinks the poisoned wine, allowing Taylor to win the Golden Power of Veto. With Taylor now holding the veto, Drew begins to worry that he could become the replacement target. Haley consults with her allies to determine the best renom, expressing a preference for Lyric as she continues to throw her own allies under the bus. However, Kamu pushes for Mallory to be nominated instead, which rubs Haley the wrong way. On Day 28, Taylor uses the Power of Veto to save herself, and Haley nominates Lyric as the replacement nominee.
990	15	"Episode 15"	Days 28–31	Thursday 8:00 p.m.	August 6, 2026	3.48	0.7
Haley officially makes Drew her primary target, with Melody serving as the backup plan. Elsewhere, Mallory learns that Lyric has been throwing both her and Melody under the bus, prompting Lyric to attempt some damage control. Meanwhile, Drew begins making moves to keep both himself and Melody safe by the end of the week. The Icons begin to see more value in keeping Drew than evicting him. In the BB Block Buster Competition ("The Paw Patrol Dino Puzzle"), Nominees race to complete a two-layered puzzle. The first HouseGuest to correctly put the puzzle together wins the Block Buster, leaving the remaining two nominees on the block. Drew secures the win, leaving Lyric and Melody as the final nominees for the week. On Day 31, Lyric is evicted from the Big Brother house by a vote of 8–3. Note: Big Brother: Unlocked surprise guest and Big Brother 19 winner Josh Martinez joins Julie Chen Moonves on stage to discuss the season.
Week 5
991	16	"Big Brother: Unlocked 8/07/26"	Day 31, Various	Friday 8:00 p.m.	August 7, 2026	1.77	0.2
The HouseGuests scramble to figure out who flipped the vote, as Dee and Angela lie about voting to keep Lyric. Drew and Melody celebrate both surviving the eviction. Former Big Brother winners Derrick Levasseur and Taylor Hale, along with Jerry O'Connell, are joined by another former winner, Josh Martinez, to recap and revisit the last two weeks of the season. They are also joined by the two recent evictees, Jason and Lyric. Featured segments included "Missing Moments", "BB Bad Ass/Dumb Ass", "The Rant Room" and "Creator Corner". O'Connell revealed that Mallory has been voted to enter the "BB Time Capsule" next. The episode concluded with the HouseGuests beginning the fifth Head of Household competition, "Sasquatch Watch".
992	17	"Episode 17"	Days 31–32	Sunday 8:00 p.m.	August 9, 2026	3.47	0.6
Hours before the eviction, Dee, Devens and Angela plot to ensure Lyric is the one evicted. They bring Barrett and Mallory into the plan, creating a majority with Taylor. Taylor then informs La Trice of the blindside. Following the vote, the house is thrown into chaos as Dee and Angela lie about their votes, causing everyone to question Chuk and Kamu. In the Head of Household Competition ("Sasquatch Watch"), HouseGuest must hang on a tilting wall while being doused in water and slime. The final four comes down to Drew, Kamu, La Trice and Yash. In the end, La Trice beats out the boys and becomes the new Head of Household. Mallory is voted to enter the BB Time Capsule. Her attempt to gain a power is unsuccessful, as she earned the "Adam and Eve" punishment from Big Brother 16. She must chose another HouseGuest to be chained to for 48 hours. She chooses Melody. In the HoH room, Taylor and La Trice discuss a plan to backdoor Haley, with Barrett, Drew and Kamu as potential pawns. However, Yash and Kamu inform Taylor that Chuk is targeting La Trice, causing them to rethink their initial nomination plans. On Day 32, La Trice nominates Barrett, Chuk and Haley for eviction.
993	18	"Episode 18"	Days 32–35	Wednesday 8:00 p.m.	August 12, 2026	3.44	0.7
Chuk and Haley are distraught and hurt after being blindsided by La Trice. Haley regrets not nominating her when she had the opportunity last week. Meanwhile, Mallory and Melody continue their Adam and Eve Punishment. Dee finally reveals to Devens that she won the "BB Bribe" power last week. Haley continues to push Angela and Dee for answers about the vote flip, causing Angela to spiral over her relationship with Haley. Angela eventually admits to the other members of the "Red Corner" that she has been lying. During the Veto Draw, Kamu and Dee are selected to compete alongside the three nominees and La Trice. In the Gym, Dee finally comes clean to Kamu about her vote. She also reveals that she won a power in the "BB Time Capsule". As they talk, Haley and Chuk interrupt them and voice how they feel burned by the house. Kamu then grab Yash and Angela to figure out who cast the third vote. Angela attempts to apologize to Haley, but when Haley continues to lie to the group, Angela becomes frustrated and calls her out. In the Veto Competition ("Saturday Night Veto"), HouseGuests must cross a bridge by stepping on one of two tiles that would highlight red or green. When stepping on a green tile, they can proceed to one of the next two tiles, but if they stepped on a red tile they must restart from the beginning. In the final round, Kamu crosses in the fastest amount of time to defeat Barrett and wins the Golden Power of Veto. La Trice confirms with Kamu that he should not use the veto and keep the nominations the same as the entire house is on board with evicting either Haley or Chuk. He informs Chuk and Haley that La Trice would like him not to use the veto. Elsewhere, Mallory and Melody are released from their punishment. They later form an Alliance called "For the American People", F.A.P for short, with Barrett and Drew. On Day 35, Kamu decides not to use Power of Veto leaving Barrett, Chuk and Haley as the nominees.
994	19	"Episode 19"	Days 35–38	Thursday 8:00 p.m.	August 13, 2026	3.52	0.8
Following the Veto Ceremony, Chuk and Haley feel burned by Kamu's decision not to use it to save them. The HouseGuests go back and forth over who to evict this week between Chuk and Haley. Taylor tries to give Chuk pointers on how to improve his game. In the HoH room, some of the newbies discuss targeting the Icons next week. Later, Barrett and Drew relay the conversation back to Dee, Devens, and Angela. In the BB Block Buster competition ("Newton's Apples"), Nominees must roll and land five balls on the top of a ramp. Once done, they must knock all five balls down and press a buzzer. The first player to compete the challenge would save themselves from eviction. Haley secures the win, leaving Barrett and Chuk as the final nominees for the week. On Day 38, Chuk is evicted from the Big Brother house by a vote of 9–1, with Haley being the sole vote to evict Barrett.
Week 6
995	20	"Episode 20"	Days 38–39	Sunday 8:00 p.m.	August 16, 2026	3.37	0.7
Following Chuk's eviction, Angela tries to repair her relationship with Haley, who feels she was bullied throughout the week. However, some HouseGuests still want Haley gone and would target her if they were to win Head of Household. Kamu and Haley also clear the air and agree to try working together again. In the Head of Household competition ("Bugs in the System"), the HouseGuests face off head-to-head. In each round, they must identify the area of the screen containing the most bugs. The first HouseGuest to answer correctly advances and selects the next two competitors, while the loser is eliminated. In the final round, Yash defeats Barrett to become the new Head of Household. Angela immediately feels uncomfortable with Yash as HoH, while Taylor and La Trice celebrate his victory. Meanwhile, Devens and Dee believe they are safe and question how they have managed to make it this far in the game. Melody is voted to enter the BB Time Capsule. Her attempt to gain a power is unsuccessful, as she instead earns the "Lord of the Latrine" punishment from Big Brother 23. Upstairs, Kamu, Drew and Yash discuss potential nominees. Kamu throws the Icons under the bus, telling Yash that he should target Dee. Devens questions Yash about why he would target a member of the "Wolf Pack." He relays the conversation to Dee and encourages her to use her "BB Bribe" power. Dee and Yash later discuss nominations. Dee initially offers to bribe him to keep both Angela and herself safe, but Yash turns down the offer. She then changes her proposal, offering to keep only herself safe for the week, which Yash seriously considers. On Day 39, Yash ultimately declines Dee's bribe and nominates Angela, Dee and Haley for eviction.
996	21	"Episode 21"	Days 39–42	Wednesday 8:00 p.m.	August 19, 2026	3.35	0.7
After nominations, Dee lets Kamu know about her bribes to Yash in exchange for safety. Angela and Haley struggle with being on the block, while Kamu begins putting the pieces into place to make Dee the main target for the week. Elsewhere, Devens begins questioning whether he needs to use his Diamond Power of Veto to save Dee. However, he does not want to blow up his relationships with the other side of the house. He has formed an alliance with Taylor and Kamu called "The Primaries" and another alliance with Yash and Kamu called "The Bermuda Triangle." Meanwhile, Melody and the house struggle to get through her punishment, as she must unlock the bathroom every time someone needs to use it. Drew spills to Dee the information he has received from Kamu and Yash about targeting her. The two begin to suspect that Kamu is controlling Yash's HoH reign. During the Veto Draw, Barrett and Melody are selected to compete alongside the three nominees and Yash. Drew also tells Barrett that he needs to win the Power of Veto, as he could become the replacement nominee if one of the nominees are saved. In the Veto Competition ("OTEV the Belligerent B-Movie Slob"), players must find and return the correct HouseGuest's name based on OTEV’s clues. Anyone who returns with an incorrect answer or is the last are eliminated. In round four, Yash beats Barrett with the correct answer and win the Golden Power of Veto. Immediately following the competition, Yash knows he wants to keep his nominations the same with him and Kamu celebrating a smooth week. Later, Melody is finally freed from her latrine duties. Alone in the Gym, Devens talks through his options and decides that if he is going to use his Diamond Power of Veto, he wants to make a big move by targeting Kamu. He brainstorms expanding "The Crossovers" alliance to include Mallory and Melody. They later form "Mosh Pit", a seven-person alliance. Downstairs, Dee clues in Angela on Devens' plans. On Day 42, Yash does not use the Golden Power of Veto. As Yash begins his closing statements, Devens interrupts and uses his Diamond Power of Veto on Dee. He shocks the house by nominating Kamu in her place.
997	22	"Episode 22"	Days 42–45	Thursday 8:00 p.m.	August 20, 2026	3.45	0.6
Following the surprise at the Veto Meeting, Devens and Dee celebrate both being safe and seeing Kamu on the block. Kamu tries to clear the air with Devens and Dee, while Yash goes to bat for Kamu with "F.A.P." The "Mosh Pit" alliance agrees to get Kamu out if he remains on the block following the Block Buster. Meanwhile, Melody and Mallory waver back and forth over which side to support. In the BB Block Buster Competition ("Space Race"), nominees must catch 10 yellow and 10 red balls swirling around them in an air machine and place them into a correct tubes. Angela manages to complete the task first, securing her safety and taking herself off the block. On Day 45, Kamu is evicted from the Big Brother house by a vote of 8–1 with La Trice being the sole vote to evict Haley. Note: Big Brother: Unlocked surprise guest and Big Brother 3 runner-up Danielle Reyes joins Julie Chen Moonves on stage to discuss the season.
Week 7
998	23	"Episode 23" (Note: This episode included an embedded installment of Big Brother: Unlocked.)	Day 45–46, Various	Sunday 8:00 p.m.	August 23, 2026	3.09	0.6
The episode opened with the fallout of the sixth eviction. Former Big Brother winners Derrick Levasseur and Taylor Hale, along with Jerry O'Connell, were joined by Big Brother runners-up Danielle Reyes and Paul Abrahamian to recap and revisit the last few weeks of the season. They were also joined by the recent evictee, Kamu Kirk. Featured segments included "Missing Moments", "BB Bad Ass/Dumb Ass", "The Rant Room" and "Creator Corner". Inside the house, the HouseGuests celebrate Kamu's eviction. Mallory and Melody try to do damage control with Taylor and Yash after the vote, while consoling La Trice after leaving her out of the vote. Yash gives them information that makes the girls question Barrett and Drew's loyalties. Paul Abrahamian from Big Brother 18 and Big Brother 19 visits the house to host the Head of Household Competition. In the competition ("Norse by Norsewest"), HouseGuests must race across a balance beam obstacle course and hit seven buttons in the fastest time possible. Barrett and Mallory throw the competition, allowing Dee to clocks in with the fastest time and become the new Head of Household. Devens and Dee look to solidify the "Mosh Pit" alliance and target the remaining players, Haley, La Trice, Taylor and Yash, who all sense the danger they are in. While talking with Dee, La Trice throws "F.A.P." under the bus. Later, The Icons brainstorm a plan to use Dee's "BB Bribe" power by offering Yash $5,000 to keep them all safe, which he accepts. Yash also lies about Drew, making the Icons even more suspicious of him. During an alliance meeting, Drew further grows their suspicions by not completely airing out Yash. Drew is voted to enter the "BB Time Capsule". His attempt to gain a power is successful, as he earned the "Never-Not Pass" power from Big Brother 15. On Day 46, Dee nominates Drew, La Trice and Taylor for eviction. Before the ceremony can be adjourned, Taylor and La Trice both accuse Drew of lying about them.
999	24	"Episode 24"	Days 46–49	Wednesday 8:00 p.m.	August 26, 2026	3.22	0.7
At the Nomination Ceremony, Taylor and Drew continue to go back and forth over who lied about targeting the Icons. The rest of the house joins in as they bring up who said what. Drew admits that he is the biggest liar in the house and that he has lied directly to La Trice, Yash, and Taylor. After the meeting ends, Dee is happy that Drew has finally picked a side rather than continuing to play the middle. The other members of "F.A.P." worry that they could become targets for Dee after she nominated Drew. In the backyard, Drew and La Trice continue to exchange words. La Trice tries to smooth things over with Angela, explaining that she only meant Devens and Dee when she referred to the Icons. During the Veto Draw, Angela and Barrett are selected to compete alongside the nominees and Dee. Devens predicts that the Veto will be used, as he believes every player would likely use it if given the opportunity. He would like Mallory to be the replacement nominee if that happens. He runs the idea by Angela and Dee, who both gladly agree. They fear that "F.A.P." would take advantage of having the majority within the "Mosh Pit." In the Veto Competition ("Feel The Burn"), players must use various exercise machines to complete the most reps within a set time limit. The player or players with the fewest reps in each round will be eliminated. Angela and Drew are eliminated in the first round, while Dee is eliminated in the second round. In the final round, La Trice completes the most reps to win the Golden Power of Veto. Following the competition, The Icons begin discussing the possibility of Mallory being the replacement nominee. Drew defends Mallory's loyalty to the "Mosh Pit." However, Dee later tries to get Drew and Barrett on board with the plan. The boys are upset with The Icons' lack of loyalty, as they are now considering nominating two "Mosh Pit" members, with Drew declaring the Crossovers alliance dead. Devens overhears them talking in the backyard and lies that he heard everything they said. The boys immediately approach Devens, voice their concerns, and try to smooth things over with him. In the HoH room, Dee informs Mallory that she might be the replacement nominee, greatly upsetting both her and Melody. The girls feel led astray by Barrett and Drew, who had encouraged them to trust The Icons. On Day 49, La Trice uses the Power of Veto to save herself, and Dee nominates Mallory as the replacement nominee.
1000	25	"Episode 25"	Days 49–52, Various (Note: In honor of the show's 1000th episode, clips from this season and past seasons were shown to viewers to reminisce notable moments.)	Thursday 8:00 p.m.	August 27, 2026	3.25	0.6
With another ally on the block, Barrett is upset and annoyed by Dee's nominations for the week. Mallory fears she has become the Icons' main target. After Barrett voices his frustrations, Devens and Dee solidify that Mallory needs to go this week. They work on Haley and also loop in Drew and Barrett to ensure they stay on board. Frustrated by Drew's reluctance to defend Mallory due to also being on the block, Barrett brings the news to Mallory and Melody. The three form a plan to team up with Yash and Taylor to potentially blindside the Icons by voting out Drew instead. In the BB Block Buster Competition ("BB Grand Cliptacular"), nominees must scan a series of clues and images featuring past events from Big Brother past. They must correctly identify the area the clues are pointing to, either being A, B, or C. Drew secures the win, leaving Mallory and Taylor as the final nominees for the week. On Day 52, Mallory is evicted from the Big Brother house by a vote of 6–2. Note: Janelle Pierzina, Xavier Prather, Derek Frazier, Azah Awasum, Kyland Young, Hannah Chaddha, Tiffany Mitchell, and Dan Gheesling join Julie Chen Moonves on stage to discuss the season. Various HouseGuests from the series were in the studio to celebrate the show's 1000th episode.
Week 8
1001	26	"Episode 26"	Days 52–53	Sunday 9:00 p.m	August 30, 2026	3.63	0.7
After Mallory's eviction, the house is left emotional. Drew tries to smooth things over with Melody after voting to evict Mallory, while Barrett feels completely burned by the Icons. As the house enters the Final 10, he knows he must choose a side soon. Previous HouseGuests Britney Haynes, Cody Calafiore, Tiffany Mitchell and Keanu Soto enter the backyard to host the Head of Household Competition. Britney announces that the competition has been canceled. Instead, one HouseGuest will be eliminated before the end of the night. The HouseGuests will each compete in four different contests, with the stakes increasing throughout the night. In the first contest, the HouseGuests must balance 20 blocks on a hanging candelabra. The first HouseGuest to complete the task wins the "Stone of Safety" and must choose another HouseGuest to save. Dee wins and chooses to save Devens. Following this, Dee is given the "Stone of Sacrifice," which she must award to two HouseGuests who will compete for their lives in the next contest. The winner will return to the house, save one HouseGuest and sacrifice another. After deliberating with her alliance, Dee gives the "Stone of Sacrifice" to Drew and Haley. In the second contest, Drew and Haley must complete a giant puzzle. Drew wins the "Stone of Safety" and returns to the house, where the Icons persuade him to honor his earlier promise to save Angela and sacrifice Barrett. This causes Barrett feels even more burned, as the Icons sent Haley into the competition first and have left him out yet again. Drew ultimately honors his word, saving Angela and sacrificing Barrett. In the third contest, Barrett and Haley must transport 28 grapes across a balance beam. If they fall or drop any of the grapes, they must restart the task. Barrett completes the challenge first, winning safety. As the winner, he must choose two HouseGuests to receive the "Stone of Sacrifice," sending them into the final elimination. Yash hopes to be sent into the competition so he can have the opportunity to send Haley home, viewing her as another number for the Icons. However, Dee and Devens push back, hoping Barrett will instead send Taylor and La Trice into the competition, giving Haley a better chance of surviving.
1002	27	"Episode 27"	Days 53–56	Wednesday 8:00 p.m.	September 2, 2026	3.32	0.7
Barrett must choose between pleasing the Icons or siding with the other side of the house. He decides to take the risk, sacrificing Yash and La Trice in the process. In the final Safety Competition, the nominated HouseGuests must stack all of their uniquely shaped puzzle pieces. The HouseGuest who finishes first will earn the sole vote to eliminate one of the other losers from the competition. Yash wins the competition and chooses to eliminate Haley from the Big Brother house. Now in the Final 9 and officially entering the jury phase of the game, the HouseGuests celebrate. The house is split 4–4, with Barrett caught in the middle of both groups, though his allegiance is no longer with the Icons. Zingbot enters the house to deliver some brutal zings to the Final 9 HouseGuests. In the Head of Household Competition ("2026: A Zing Odyssey"), the HouseGuests must answer a series of true-or-false questions, earning one point for each correct answer. The HouseGuest with the most points at the end of the competition will become the new Head of Household. Drew ties with Melody and Yash and defeats both of them in the tiebreaker round, becoming the new Head of Household. Following his win, Drew immediately plans to nominate La Trice and Taylor, with hopes of backdooring Yash. Devens volunteers to go up as a pawn, hoping to protect Dee and Angela while making the decision easier for Drew. Dee is annoyed by this, wanting Melody nominated instead, but Drew refuses to nominate his showmance, especially after the pair finally reconcile. However on Day 53, at the Nomination Ceremony, Drew nominates La Trice, Taylor and Yash. Taylor, Melody and Yash view the nominations as cowardly, believing Drew is simply doing the Icons’ dirty work. During the Veto Draw, Dee and Melody are selected to compete alongside the nominees and Drew. In the Veto Competition ("The Gold, the Bad, and the Ugly"), the players must balance and transfer 25 gold nuggets using a seesaw shovel. Yash finishes first and wins the Power of Veto. Drew realizes he is now in a tricky position, as he must choose whether to nominate Melody, Barrett or one of the Icons as the replacement nominee. Devens continues to make things easier for Drew by volunteering to be the pawn, but the Icons push back, hoping to convince Drew to make Melody the replacement nominee instead. Drew instead wants to nominate Dee, as she has not been talking to him since she nominated him the prior week. On Day 56, Yash uses the Power of Veto to save himself, and Drew nominates Devens as the replacement nominee.
1003	28	"Episode 28"	Days 56–59	Thursday 8:00 p.m.	September 3, 2026	3.62	0.7
Devens begins to realize that volunteering for the block may have been a stupid move, but he believes the risk is worth it because he trusts his Crossovers alliance to keep him safe. Meanwhile, Melody, Taylor and Yash discuss keeping Barrett's betrayal of the Icons a secret. Angela grows suspicious of the other players, noticing that they seem far too excited about Devens being nominated. Barrett continues working to maintain the Crossovers' trust and reassure them that his allegiance remains with them. As Devens grows closer to the boys, Dee begins questioning whether he will ultimately be more loyal to her or to them. She and Angela discuss the possibility of voting Devens out if he remains on the block when the vote arrives. In the BB Block Buster competition ("Your Game in Ruins"), the nominees must collect four balls from their ball pit and then drop them off an elevated platform into a crystal jar. Devens wins the competition leaving La Trice and Taylor as the final nominees for the week. On Day 59, La Trice is evicted from the Big Brother house by a vote of 4–2, with Angela and Melody voting to evict Taylor. Note: Big Brother: Unlocked surprise guest Jay Mohr joins Julie Chen Moonves on stage to discuss the season.
Week 9
1004	29	"Big Brother: Unlocked 9/04/26"	Day 59, Various	Friday 8:00 p.m.	September 4, 2026	1.66	0.2
The HouseGuests discuss La Trice's eviction and the BB Block Buster, while Barrett voices his disdain for not being able to vote out Devens this week. Former Big Brother winners Derrick Levasseur and Taylor Hale, along with Jerry O'Connell, are joined by Jay Mohr, to recap and revisit the last few weeks of the season. They are also joined by Zingbot. Featured segments included "Missing Moments", "BB Bad Ass/Dumb Ass", "Something Surprising", "The Rant Room" and "Creator Corner". The episode concluded with the HouseGuests beginning the ninth Head of Household competition, "Rainbow Rollers".
1005	30	"Episode 30"	Days 59–60	Sunday 8:00 p.m.	September 6, 2026	2.98	0.5
Before the Head of Household Competition, Taylor is bummed about how close she came to winning the Block Buster and seeing La Trice evicted instead. The HouseGuests begin questioning another rogue vote from the previous eviction, wondering who wanted to evict Taylor over La Trice. Melody lies about the vote, causing Devens to blame Dee, who is upset by the accusation. The HouseGuests then head to the backyard for the competition. They must attempt to land seven colored balls in their corresponding color zones. The first HouseGuest to land all seven balls will win and become the new Head of Household. Barrett lands his seventh ball first, making him the new HoH for the first time this season. Barrett is excited to finally have power and promises safety to his former F.A.P. allies, Drew and Melody. The three contemplate putting all three Icons on the block together. During his one-on-one with Devens, Barrett voices his belief that the Icons have been handed a lot in this game so far and would likely choose to take each other to the end over him. Elsewhere, following a conversation with Devens, Angela becomes suspicious of Barrett's nomination plans. Barrett lets her in on his consideration of nominating the Icons. Angela breaks down, telling him that she believes it is way too soon to blow up the Crossovers alliance. She angrily heads downstairs and tells Dee about Barrett's plans. The Icons make a last-ditch effort to save themselves. With everyone in the HoH room, they throw Yash under the bus, revealing the details of the "BB Bribe" that protects the Icons during his next HoH. The other HouseGuests are left to debate who is telling the truth and who is lying. On Day 60, Barrett follows through with his initial plans and nominates Angela, Dee and Devens for eviction, stating that while Yash may not be able to nominate the Icons, he can. Before the ceremony ends, Angela, Dee and Devens call out Yash for lying about the "BB Bribe".
1006	31	"Episode 31"	Days 60–63	Wednesday 8:00 p.m.	September 9, 2026	3.21	0.6
The Icons continue to out Yash for lying about the deal they made, hoping to make him a bigger target. However, their efforts only solidified Barrett's nominations. Drew is upset with the nominations as the Icons view him and Barrett as a duo, leading to him receiving blame. Angela, Dee and Devens pledge to make sure Barrett's game is blown up moving forward. In the kitchen, Taylor interrogates Yash about the bribe. He honestly tells her in secret that he cannot nominate any of the Icons during his next HoH. Yash later outlines a plan to Barrett about why he should pick him for the veto if given the chance. Drew also asks Barrett to pick him for the veto, and Barrett promises that he will. The two also plan and joke about taking Angela off the block and replacing her with Yash. During the Veto Draw, Taylor and Yash are selected to compete alongside the nominees and Barrett. Barrett selected Yash, while Angela selected Taylor. Drew is upset that neither player picked him despite promising to. In the Veto Competition ("BB Comics"), players must zipline past a wall of superhero-themed comics, memorize their order, spot the differences, and recreate the correct sequence on their boards. Yash finishes the competition with the fastest time and wins the Golden Power of Veto. The Icons realize there is no chance Yash will use the veto on any of them. The new players meet in the HoH room and agree to a ceasefire until every Icon has been sent to the jury, though Yash and Drew question how long the agreement will actually last. Devens attempts to convince Yash to use the veto on him. All three nominees call out Barrett and voice how they will all be targeting him moving forward. On Day 63, Yash decides not to use the Power of Veto, leaving the Icons as the nominees for the week.
1007	32	"Episode 32"	Days 63–66	Thursday 8:00 p.m.	September 10, 2026	3.53	0.7
After not using the veto, Yash and Taylor are adamant about getting either Dee or Devens out, no matter what. Angela feels safe against the other two Icons. Melody is upset with the Icons' shenanigans and Drew playing the fence. Devens and Drew plan to pretend Devens is targeting Drew to lessen their target. Drew tries to do damage control with Dee, but she believes he has turned on them. Angela frustrates Melody and Drew by constantly gossiping about their showmance. Dee makes a push to secure votes in case she is on the block against Devens or Angela. Taylor and Yash seriously consider keeping her, as they believe she will try to go after Drew, Barrett and Melody. Devens makes a similar pitch, which Yash is receptive too but Taylor is doubtful of. The pair debate the pros and cons of all three icons, worried that if Angela stays she would become a pawn. In the BB Block Buster Competition, nominees must race to assemble an eight piece puzzle. Devens wins the competition leaving Angela and Dee as the final nominees for the week. On Day 66, Angela is evicted from the Big Brother house by a vote of 3–2, with Drew and Melody voting to evict Dee.
Week 10
1008	33	"Episode 33"	Days 66–67	Sunday 8:30 p.m.	September 13, 2026	3.47	0.7
Melody, Barrett, and Drew are blindsided by Angela's eviction, whilst Devens and Dee feel confident with their new majority. Dee publicly vows to evict Barrett no matter what, and Yash privately makes a similar pledge to evict Drew. Drew is left confused by the Icons betrayal, as well as Dee calling him out for supposedly lying before the eviction, and Dee refuses to listen to his reasonings. Yash and Taylor place the blame on Drew for their decision to blindside F.A.P., which Barrett and Melody believe. Yash also lies to Barrett and Melody that he has made a handshake deal to keep Devens safe if he wins Head of Household. Dee struggles with Angela's eviction, feeling she was her best real connection in the house. In the Head of Household Competition ("Wet and Wild West""), HouseGuests must catch water, fill a jar and retrieve at apple. They must then race to finish to lock in their time. Yash had the fastest time and became Head of Household for his second time this season. Drew feels confident that he will be nominated and Yash's target, whilst Barrett and Melody remain unsure about the truth of Yash's bribe and if they can convince him to nominate Devens. Yash confirms his intention to nominate the remaining members of F.A.P., but insists to Barrett and Melody that they are pawns. He and Taylor also continue to lie about the bribe, claiming it only affects Dee. Yash proposes nominating Taylor initially so she will have two chances to save herself instead of becoming the automatic renomination, but she refuses. Barrett worries that he is the secondary target, becoming further frustrated with Drew's game as Barrett blames their friendship for his nomination. Drew feels like everyone has turned on him, and resolves to play a game focused on only protecting himself. On Day 67, Yash nominates Barrett, Drew and Melody for eviction.
1009	34	"Episode 34"	Days 67–69	Wednesday 8:00 p.m.	September 16, 2026	3.08	0.6
Yash campaigns against Drew to the Icons, but Devens considers targeting Barrett instead. Yash's continued lies about the truth of the bribe cause Barrett to doubt his claims of targeting Drew. Drew campaigns for himself by promising everyone his loyalty, causing Dee to propose keeping Drew in order to target Yash and Taylor at the next eviction. Melody and Barrett struggle with the pressures of being on the block, with Melody using a prop phone to pretend to call her mother for support. Drew and Dee bond over their shared Hispanic heritage. The houseguests receive messages from their families, causing high emotions among the group. Yash considers who he wants playing in the veto, reasoning that, despite her being the renomination, Taylor would not be able to beat Drew. Devens proposes that Yash pick him to ensure either Barrett or Drew are evicted; Taylor reluctantly agrees. At the picks, Devens name is drawn and Yash then chooses Dee over Taylor. Yash continues to campaign against Drew, branding him a "slimeball". The houseguests learn that the winner of the veto competition will get to choose three other houseguests to watch Focker In-Law with them as a prize. In the Veto Competition ("Circle of Trust"), HouseGuests must stand on a spot whilst holding up a lie detector with their sword, with the last person standing winning the veto. At the 4 hour and 12 minute mark, Dee distracts herself whilst talking and drops her sword, eliminating herself and allowing herself and Taylor to return to the house. There, the pair are able to watch the live footage without sound. Dee agrees to vote out Drew next to Barrett after Taylor asks. Drew annoys the HouseGuests by consistently talking and doing reckless movements such as removing his shoes. Melody drops at the 5 hour 49 minutes mark after attempting to readjust her sword. The four remaining guys recall their defunct alliance "The Dapper Dans" which was created back on Day 14. Devens attempts to annoy Drew by teasing him about Melody and the possibility of using the veto on her. Devens drops after 7 hours and 48 minutes, leaving Yash and the two nominees of Drew and Barrett remaining. Drew jokingly proposes an alliance to Yash, who refuses with the confirmation that he wants Drew evicted; Drew thus continues to attempt to annoy the pair into dropping. Barrett ultimately drops at the 12 hour 39 minute mark, and immediately after he leaves Drew begins seriously pitching a secret deal with Yash. Drew swears on his cousin Matthew's life, which Yash considers, although Drew admits in the DR that Matthew does not exist. The other HouseGuests assume they are arguing, with Melody openly rooting against Drew, frustrating Devens. Drew promises to not nominate Yash on his next Head of Household and to not vote against Taylor when she becomes the renomination, switching to swearing on his sister Natalie, who Yash knows exists. Yash agrees to Drew's deal and eliminates himself from the competition, granting Drew the veto after 13 hours, 6 minutes, and 21 seconds. Yash and Drew both claim they were arguing at the end of the competition. Devens tells Drew about his concerns surrounding Melody, believing she is using him. Drew chooses Barrett and Melody, as nominees, and Devens, as a Have-Not, to watch the movie with him. Melody continuously asks Drew to use the veto on her, despite his refusals. On Day 69, Drew removes himself from the block and Yash is forced to nominate Taylor in his place.
1010	35	"Episode 35"	Days 69–73	Thursday 8:00 p.m.	September 17, 2026	3.38	0.7
Barrett and Melody act coldly to Drew after he saves himself, as it leaves them as the targets. Meanwhile, Taylor, Devens, Dee, and Yash officially name their alliance "The Culture", however Dee privately express a desire to evict Yash. The HouseGuests assume the next eviction will be a double and begin planning for it, with the Culture agreeing to target Drew. Devens and Dee instead agree to target Barrett if he survives initially, but then Yash if Barrett is evicted. Drew campaigns for safety, promising to target Yash and keep the Icons safe, whilst Drew intends to keep to his deal with Yash, he believes pushing the target onto Yash is how he can survive. Barrett campaigns to Devens, promising to defect back to the Icons and target Yash and Drew if they keep him. Melody attempts to campaign to Dee by revealing she considered keeping Dee the prior week, annoying Dee to the point she considers evicting her over Barrett. Taylor and Yash decide they would rather keep Barrett over Melody, but worry about the repercussions of betraying the Icons. In the BB Block Buster ("Crash Site Cover-Up"), nominees must roll balls down a track and into the target at the end, with the first to five winning. Melody beats both Barrett and Taylor, winning her first competition and securing her safety. On Day 73, Barrett is evicted from the Big Brother house in a vote of 3–1, with Drew keeping to his promise to Yash to keep Taylor and with Melody as the only vote against Taylor. Following Barrett’s eviction, Julie announces that it is double eviction, and the HouseGuests participate in the Head of Household Competition, ("Bleeping Through Time"). They watch clips of from prior series of Big Brother and correctly identify the bleeped out word. Melody wins Head of Household, and nominates Dee and Devens, with Devens as the target. In the Veto Competition ("Great Ball of China"), HouseGuests must first construct a wall puzzle and then roll a ball along it into a bin. Devens narrowly wins the veto, with Drew and Yash moments behind him. With Devens now safe, Melody decides to change her target and nominate Yash. Dee and Devens campaign to Drew against Yash and Taylor, promising him loyalty. Yash and Taylor, meanwhile, attempt to convince Melody to renominate Drew, but she refuses. As they are called for renominations, Taylor pulls Melody aside and asks to be renominated instead of Yash. However, Melody ultimately renominates Yash next to Dee. On Day 73, Yash is evicted from the Big Brother by a vote of 2–1 with Devens and Taylor vote to evict Yash and Dee respectively and Drew as the swing vote. Note: Big Brother: Unlocked surprise guest James Gunn joins Julie Chen Moonves on stage to discuss the season.
Week 11
1011	36	"Big Brother: Unlocked 9/18/26"	Day 73, Various	Friday 9:00 p.m.	September 18, 2026	1.40	0.2
In the Big Brother house, the HouseGuests discuss the Double Eviction. For the final time this season, former Big Brother winners Derrick Levasseur and Chelsie Baham, along with Jerry O'Connell, are joined by James Gunn, Britney Haynes and Rob Cesternino to recap and revisit the whole season. Featured segments included "Missing Moments", "The BBies" and "Creator Corner".
1012	37	"Episode 37"	Days 73–74	Sunday 8:00 p.m.	September 20, 2026	3.47	0.6
Dee and Devens celebrate surviving the double eviction. During the night, Melody is excited to finally wield power in the game and is adamant about getting an Icon out. Following Devens' veto win, the Icons begin working on Drew, pitching a final three with him. Meanwhile, Taylor and Yash try to convince Melody that if she wants an Icon out, she should nominate Drew and they will work to evict Dee. However, Melody is unwilling to do so, leaving Taylor and Yash as the likely targets. She would rather evict Yash or Dee, viewing both as major threats. Following the renomination, Drew and Melody talk privately where they agree that Yash is a bigger threat than Dee, so they side with the Icons to evict him. Following both evictions, Vince Panaro from Big Brother 27 visits the house from Egypt with the Pharaoh's Jewels. He privately gives the final five HouseGuests each a button and an ultimatum: if no one presses a button within one minute, everyone will receive $1,000. However, if one player presses their button first, they will receive $10,000 while the remaining players receive nothing. Devens presses the button first and receives the money. As a result, the HouseGuests are cursed by the Pharaoh, and within three days, another player will be evicted from the house in a special eviction. In the Head of Household competition ("Reverse the Curse"), the HouseGuests must use tweezers to complete a miniature picture puzzle. Devens completes the puzzle first, earning his second Head of Household win of the season. Devens would like to keep Drew and Dee safe as they would keep him safe in the final 4. Dee does not want to risk her being forced to be nominated if Drew wins the veto and uses it on Melody. So, she pushes for the showmance to be the initial nominations. When Devens brings this to Drew, he is upset at once again being nominated by the Icons, especially after he kept them both safe. Drew pushes hard to Devens to stay off the block.
1013	38	"Episode 38"	Days 74–77	Wednesday 10:00 p.m.	September 23, 2026	2.73	0.5
On Day 74, Devens nominates Drew and Melody for eviction. Throughout the day, Drew had campaigned constantly to Devens, but Devens ultimately told him he was too close to Melody. Drew suspects that Dee would vote to evict him if he does not win the veto; Devens promises Drew she will not, and that both of them will use the veto on Drew if they win. Dee also assures him that he is safe no matter what, but secretly wants him evicted, as she believes he is closer to Devens than her and more likely to win the final competitions than Taylor or Melody. Devens privately worries about Dee's game positioning, reluctant to ever betray her, but believing she is the only person he cannot beat. In the Veto Competition ("Block Like an Egyptian"), the players must traverse a booby-trapped course to deliver a mummified corpse to its coffin. The HouseGuest who completes the course with the fewest strikes wins the Golden Power of Veto. Drew wins the competition, earning his second veto of the season. Knowing Drew is likely to use the veto, Devens reassures Taylor that she is safe, although he plans to nominate her over Dee as the replacement nominee. Drew still plans to evict Taylor, despite knowing that Dee and Devens will likely vote to evict Melody. Taylor agrees to this, confident she is staying. Meanwhile, Melody continues to pitch to Dee about keeping her over Taylor by saying she would want to take another woman to the end, even over Drew. Whilst Dee ideally wants Melody to stay, believing she is the only HouseGuest more loyal to her than Devens, she remains worried about keeping a showmance. On Day 77, Drew removes himself from the block, and Devens nominates Taylor in his place. Melody makes a last-ditch attempt to appeal to Devens by emphasizing the amount of friends Taylor has in the jury. Drew and Dee vote to evict Taylor and Melody, respectively, causing Devens to break the tie. Melody is evicted from the Big Brother house by a vote of 2–1. Drew is distraught by this, whilst Devens is pleased, confident that he is now Drew's closest ally.
1014	39	"Episode 39"	Days 77–80	Thursday 8:00 p.m.	September 24, 2026	3.24	0.7
Following Melody's eviction, Dee, Devens, Drew, and Taylor celebrate making it to the Final 4. Dee plans to ensure that she and Taylor make it to the final two chairs over the boys. Devens feels more secure with Drew now that Melody is in the jury house, hoping that Drew will take him to the final two. Drew, meanwhile, has lost trust in the Icons and hopes to win Head of Household under the belief they will evict him otherwise. In the Head of Household Competition ("Eternally Yours"), HouseGuests must correctly identify the missing player from a series of images before assembling a puzzle. The first two players to complete the challenge advance to the second round. Drew and Taylor advance to the second round, with Taylor ultimately securing the win and her first Head of Household victory of the season, guaranteeing herself a spot in the Final 3. Drew, Dee, and Devens know that the Power of Veto will determine who makes the final decision on who completes the Final 3. On Day 78, Taylor nominates Dee and Drew for eviction. Devens begins planting seeds in Drew's head that he would take him to the final two if given the opportunity, he also promises to evict Dee over Drew, but Drew is reluctant to believe him. In the Veto Competition ("Time Travel Toilet"), players must correctly identify the day displayed on the screen. The last player to answer receives an error, and a player is eliminated after receiving three errors. Dee is eliminated first, followed by Devens. Drew defeats Taylor to win his third Golden Power of Veto. Dee and Devens are emotional, reluctant to campaign against one another but relieved they will not have to vote the other out. Knowing that Drew now holds the sole eviction vote, Dee and Devens each plead with him to keep them over the other. Drew becomes emotional knowing he must choose between two of his closest allies. He is conflicted on the best situation, afraid of being viewed as Devens' puppet but also aware Dee and Taylor would evict him over each other. On Day 80, Drew uses the veto to save himself. With his sole vote, Drew evicts Dee from the Big Brother house.
Week 12
1015	40	"Episode 40"	Day 80–81; Various	Sunday 10:14 p.m. (Note: "Episode 40" was originally scheduled to air at 9:30 p.m., but was delayed to 10:14 due to overrun of afternoon NFL coverage.)	September 27, 2026	2.95	0.5
Following Dee's eviction, Devens, Drew, and Taylor celebrate securing their spots in the Final Three. Prior to the eviction, Drew had asked both Devens and Dee whether they would throw part one of the Head of Household and take him to the final, whilst Devens agreed, Dee did not. Drew believes he has a good shot at making it to the final two chairs, as both Devens and Taylor may be willing to take him. With Dee gone, the Final Three take time to reminisce about some unseen moments from throughout the season while also reflecting on their individual journeys to the Final Three. In the jury house, Melody arrives and shares updates on the game. La Trice and Angela get into an argument with Melody over their perception that Melody coasted through the game. The jury members catch up and discuss the events of the past few weeks of gameplay. The final Head of Household competition begins with Part 1. In this competition, each HouseGuest must hold onto a hanging kite while standing on a rolling log for as long as possible. The winner earns a direct spot in the final round of the Head of Household competition. The episode ends on a dramatic cliffhanger, setting the stage for the season finale of Big Brother.
1016	41	"Episode 41"	Days 81–87	Thursday 8:00 p.m.	October 1, 2026	3.99	0.9
Returning to Part 1 of the final Head of Household competition, the Final 3 battle it out for a guaranteed spot in Part 3 of the competition. Taylor outlasts both Devens and Drew, securing her place in the final round. In Part 2 of the HoH competition, "To Be HoH or Not to Be", HouseGuests must correctly match the evicted players by knocking down their cutouts with a slingshot. Deven wins three rounds first and secures a spot in part 3 against Taylor. Big Brother 26 winner Chelsie Baham hosts the jury roundtable. After Dee arrives as the final jury member, the group discusses the Final 3 and debates who is most deserving of the win. In the final round, "Back in My Day," the HouseGuests must correctly answer questions based on statements made by jury members. Devens wins the Final Head of Household and votes to evict Drew from the Big Brother house. The jury joins Julie Chen Moonves on stage to ask their final questions to the finalists, Devens and Taylor. After the final statements, the jury casts their votes for the winner of Big Brother. The pre-jury members also return to the stage to share their thoughts on the season. On Day 87, Devens is crowned the winner of Big Brother over Taylor by a vote of 6-1. Devens is also awarded America's Favorite HouseGuest.

== Voting history ==
Color key:

Head of Household
Nominated for eviction
Saved from eviction
Won immunity via competition
Guaranteed safety via Time Capsule
Evicted / Eliminated

Big Brother 26 voting history
	Week 1	Week 2	Week 3	Week 4	Week 5	Week 6	Week 7	Week 8		Week 9	Week 10		Week 11 (Note: This week was a condensed double eviction week. Over the course of one week, HouseGuests will play two full cycles of Big Brother within a shorter timespan, cumulating in two evictions within one week.)		Week 12	
	Week 1	Week 2	Week 3	Week 4	Week 5	Week 6	Week 7	Day 52 (Note: Immediately after Mallory's eviction, Dee won the first safety competition and was granted a "Stone of Safety" from the surprise elimination. She had to choose a HouseGuest to save. She chose Devens to receive the next "Stone of Safety". Following this she had to give two players the "Stone of Sacrifice" which would make them participate in the next elimination challenge. She chose Drew and Haley. The winner of the second competition would save a player and sacrifice another. Drew won that competition, and chose to save Angela, and sacrifice Barrett. The winner of the third competition would sacrifice two not safe houseguests, along with the houseguest who lost the third safety competition, to play in the final contest. Barrett won the third competition and sacrificed Yash and La Trice. The winner of the final contest will choose who will be eliminated between the two not safe houseguests. Yash won the final contest and chose to evict Haley over La Trice.)	Day 53	Week 9	Day 67	Day 73 (Note: This week was a Double Eviction week. That means following the first eviction, the remaining HouseGuests will play a week's worth of games – including Head of Household and Power of Veto competitions, and the Nomination, Veto, and Eviction ceremonies – during the live show, culminating in a second eviction for the week.)	Day 74	Day 77	Day 87	Finale
Head of Household	Dee	Devens	Kamu	Haley	La Trice	Yash	Dee	(None)	Drew	Barrett	Yash	Melody	Devens	Taylor	Devens	(None)
Nominations (initial)	Mallory; Taylor; Yash	Jason; Lyric; Melody	La Trice; Lyric; Mallory	Drew; Melody; Taylor	Barrett; Chuk; Haley	Angela; Dee; Haley	Drew; La Trice; Taylor	(None)	La Trice; Taylor; Yash	Angela; Dee; Devens	Barrett; Drew; Melody	Dee; Devens	Drew; Melody	Dee; Drew	(None)	(None)
Veto winner(s)	Mallory	Devens	Lyric	Taylor	Kamu	Yash; Devens (Note: Devens activated the Diamond Power of Veto, a power he won in the "BB Time Capsule". This veto could be used to save a nominee, with the owner naming the replacement nominee instead of the current Head of Household. Devens used the veto on Dee and named Kamu as the replacement nominee.)	La Trice	(None)	Yash	Yash	Drew	Devens	Drew	Drew	(None)	(None)
Block Buster winner	Yash	Jason	Mallory	Drew	Haley	Angela	Drew	(None)	Devens	Devens	Melody	(None)			(None)	(None)
Nominations (final)	Ashley; Taylor	Melody; Rome	Jason; La Trice	Lyric; Melody	Barrett; Chuk	Haley; Kamu	Mallory; Taylor	~~Drew~~; ~~Barrett~~; ~~Yash~~; La Trice; Haley	La Trice; Taylor	Angela; Dee	Barrett; Taylor	Dee; Yash	Melody; Taylor	Dee; Devens	Drew; Taylor	(None)
Devens	Ashley	Head of Household	Jason	Lyric	Chuk	Kamu	Mallory	Saved	La Trice (Note: This HouseGuest won the BB Block Buster competition and was saved from possible eviction.)	Angela	Barrett (Note: Dee used her "BB Bribe" that she earned in the "BB Time Capsule". She bribed Yash with $5,000 to give safety to Angela, Dee, and Devens the next time he won Head of Household, as long as there was someone else to nominate.)	Yash	Melody (Note: As the vote was tied, the Head of Household cast the tie-breaking vote.)	Nominated	Drew (Note: As Head of Household, Devens chose to evict Drew.)	Winner
Taylor	Nominated	Melody	Jason	Lyric	Chuk	Kamu	Nominated	Saved	Nominated	Angela	Nominated	Dee	Nominated	Head of Household	Nominated	Runner-up
Drew	Ashley	Rome	Jason	Lyric	Chuk	Kamu	Mallory	Barrett	Head of Household	Dee	Barrett	Yash	Taylor	Dee	Evicted (Day 87)	Devens
Dee	Head of Household	Rome	Jason	Lyric	Chuk	Kamu	Head of Household	Drew; Haley	La Trice	Nominated	Barrett	Nominated	Melody	Nominated	Evicted (Day 80)	Devens
Melody	Ashley	Nominated	Jason	Nominated	Chuk	Kamu	Taylor	Saved	Taylor	Dee	Taylor	Head of Household	Nominated	Evicted (Day 77)		Devens
Yash	Ashley	Rome	Jason	Melody	Chuk	Head of Household	Mallory	Haley	La Trice	Angela	Head of Household	Nominated	Evicted (Day 73)			Devens
Barrett	Ashley	Rome	Jason	Lyric	Nominated	Kamu	Taylor	La Trice; Yash	La Trice	Head of Household	Nominated	Evicted (Day 73)				Devens
Angela	Ashley	Rome	Jason	Lyric	Chuk	Kamu	Mallory	Saved	Taylor	Nominated	Evicted (Day 66)					Devens
La Trice	Ashley	Rome	Nominated	Lyric	Head of Household	Haley	Mallory	Nominated	Nominated	Evicted (Day 59)						Taylor
Haley	Ashley	Rome	Jason	Head of Household	Barrett	Nominated	Mallory	Nominated	Eliminated (Day 53)							
Mallory	Ashley	Rome	Jason	Lyric	Chuk	Kamu	Nominated	Evicted (Day 52)								
Kamu	Ashley	Rome	Head of Household	Melody	Chuk	Nominated	Evicted (Day 45)									
Chuk	Ashley (Note: This HouseGuest won a competition and was immune from eviction.)	Rome	Jason	Melody	Nominated	Evicted (Day 38)										
Lyric	Ashley	Rome	Jason	Nominated	Evicted (Day 31)											
Jason	Ashley	Rome	Nominated	Evicted (Day 24)												
Rome	Ashley	Nominated	Evicted (Day 17)													
Ashley	Nominated	Evicted (Day 10)														
Evicted	Ashley; 14 of 14 votes to evict	Rome; 12 of 13 votes to evict	Jason; 12 of 12 votes to evict	Lyric; 8 of 11 votes to evict	Chuk; 9 of 10 votes to evict	Kamu; 8 of 9 votes to evict	Mallory; 6 of 8 votes to evict	Haley; Yash's choice to eliminate	La Trice; 4 of 6 votes to evict	Angela; 3 of 5 votes to evict	Barrett; 3 of 4 votes to evict	Yash; 2 of 3 votes to evict	Melody; 2 of 3 votes to evict	Dee; Drew's choice to evict	Drew; Devens' choice to evict	Devens; 6 votes to win
Evicted	Ashley; 14 of 14 votes to evict	Rome; 12 of 13 votes to evict	Jason; 12 of 12 votes to evict	Lyric; 8 of 11 votes to evict	Chuk; 9 of 10 votes to evict	Kamu; 8 of 9 votes to evict	Mallory; 6 of 8 votes to evict	Haley; Yash's choice to eliminate	La Trice; 4 of 6 votes to evict	Angela; 3 of 5 votes to evict	Barrett; 3 of 4 votes to evict	Yash; 2 of 3 votes to evict	Melody; 2 of 3 votes to evict	Dee; Drew's choice to evict	Drew; Devens' choice to evict	Taylor; 1 vote to win

== Production ==
=== Development ===
On May 13, 2026, CBS announced that Big Brother 28 would premiere on July 9, 2026. Julie Chen Moonves teased in April 2026 that the theme of the season was "brilliant" enough that she asked the producers why they had not done it before. On July 1, 2026, the theme was revealed as "Time Trip", promoted as "turning time into the ultimate twist" and "where history is rewritten and anything is possible"; the house featured rooms and "relics" themed after specific time periods and time itself, including a "living room of eras", a futuristic room with sleep pods, a clockwork-themed bathroom, and a hallway of "failed inventions" (including a keytar, pogo stick, and the "Time Laser" from Big Brother 25). A new twist known as the "BB Time Capsule" provided the opportunity for contestants to receive powers or punishments revived from previous seasons.

On August 27, 2026, Big Brother became the first U.S. primetime television series to reach 1,000 episodes. The episode featured retrospectives on the show's history, and presentations of viewer-voted awards for memorable houseguests and moments, including Dan Gheesling winning the awards for best winner (Big Brother 10) and best moment (Big Brother 14's "funeral"), and Janelle Pierzina winning the award for best non-winning houseguest.

== Release ==
=== Broadcast ===
The season premiered on CBS on July 9, 2026. Thereafter, new episodes air on Sundays, Wednesdays, and Thursdays, with Wednesday night episodes lasting 90 minutes long. Big Brother: Unlocked also returned bi-weekly on Friday nights throughout the season with a live studio audience. On June 30, it was announced that Jerry O'Connell would joining previous hosts Taylor Hale and Derrick Levasseur on Unlocked. Additionally, CBS teased that they would launch a new interactive fan vote during these episodes.

=== Streaming ===
Following its broadcast, new episodes stream on Paramount+ and CBS On Demand. As with previous seasons, Paramount+ is also providing access to 24/7 live feeds. The live feeds also stream on Pluto TV in a free advertisement-supported format. Live feeds, for the first time, stream on YouTube for limited period following each episode.

== Critical response ==
=== Kamu Kirk's controversies ===
==== Anti-drag remarks ====
Viewers criticized houseguest Kamu Kirk following anti-drag remarks he made on live feeds. During Week 2, Kirk and Rick Devens, the Head of Household, reacted to fellow houseguest Drew Campbell wearing unicorn-themed womens pyjamas around the house. After Devens asked Kirk if Campbell was dressed in "women's clothes", Kirk confirmed it and referenced Campbell inviting him to join, stating "I'm not doing that, bro". Devens agreed, replying "Not until Jason is [Head of Household]" referencing fellow houseguest and drag queen Jason De Puy. Kirk responded with "I said, 'Bro, miss me with that drag stuff. Miss me. I'm still an MMA guy, and I have an image to uphold.'" Viewers and alumni criticized Kirk's response with the awareness of De Puy's drag queen history. Alumni such as Big Brother 15 winner Andy Herren, Big Brother 23 runner-up Derek Frazier, and Big Brother 27 winner Ashley Hollis criticized Kirk's comments on live feeds.

Big Brother 16 alum Frankie Grande, also friends with De Puy, criticized Kirk's remarks on X and called Kirk and Devens' exchange "homophobia incarnate." Initially critical of Devens in the exchange, Grande wrote, "Regardless, men behaving in a repulsed or shocked way when a man dresses feminine or in women's clothing is homophobic. Period." Big Brother 27 alum Jimmy Heagerty also criticized Kirk's comments on X, calling Kirk "disgusting" and "the opposite of masculinity." Heagerty wrote, "Nobody's forcing you to get in drag, nobody's forcing you to wear unicorn pajamas, and if you don't wanna wear it, you can just shut the fuck up."

==== Kirk's resurfaced 2025 video ====
In week 3 of the season, during Kirk's reign as Head of Household, a December 2025 video on Kirk's Instagram account resurfaced on social media of him mocking George Floyd's murder in 2020. In a video visible in his profile's highlights, Kirk is shown recording an incident of a person being arrested, who is heard saying "I can't breathe" numerous times. Kirk mocks the person and says, "Bro thinks he's George Floyd." At the end of the video, he makes a remark about taking the parking spot in the police's vicinity. Viewers criticized Kirk's resurfaced video and called for his expulsion from the show.

==== Comments about children to Melody Morris ====
In week 5, Kirk was discussing the idea of children with fellow houseguests Rick Devens, Yash Patel, and Melody Morris, the latter of whom expressed a desire to be childless. Kirk spoke to the cameras, encouraging viewers to message Morris baby emojis, stating "We're getting you pregnant, whether you like it or not". He later told her about his sister, who initially did not want children, but now has a family. This led to further backlash online as viewers criticized the statements. In interviews, Kirk stated he "[didn't] remember that comment being made" and that it was "purely a joke".
