= Rick Devens =

American reality TV personality

- Born: Patrick William Devens; April 5, 1984 (age 42)
- Education: Virginia Tech
- Occupations: TV personality; News anchor
- Television: Survivor: Edge of Extinction; Survivor 50: In the Hands of the Fans; Big Brother 28 (winner)
- Spouse: Becca Devens (m. 2012)
- Children: 2
- Website: rickdevens.com

Patrick William "Rick" Devens (born April 5, 1984) is an American reality television personality and former TV news anchor. He competed on two seasons of Survivor and one season of Big Brother, winning the latter.

== Education and career ==
Devens graduated from Virginia Tech with a degree in broadcast journalism in 2006. He worked at WGXA morning news in Macon, Georgia since 2009. As of 2026, he was working as Director of Communications at Middle Georgia State University.

== Television appearances ==
=== Survivor: Edge of Extinction ===
Devens finished in fourth place in his debut season Survivor: Edge of Extinction (2019). After being just the fourth player voted out, Devens was sent to the titular Edge of Extinction, where he could return to the game by competing in a challenge. Devens won the challenge to get back into the game, filling the final slot available pre-merge. Devens went on to win four immunity challenges and find four hidden immunity idols to remain in the game. At the final four, Devens lost the immunity challenge and was eliminated by the eventual winner Chris Underwood in a fire making competition, finishing in 4th place.

=== Survivor 50: In the Hands of the Fans ===
Despite originally being selected as an alternate for Survivor 50, Devens ended up making the cast. Devens was placed on the Cila tribe pre-merge which went to multiple pre-merge tribal councils. Notable events throughout the season include Devens and fellow castaway Christian Hubicki making a ploy at tribal council to place a fake hidden immunity idol on the set to confuse other players, and feuding with tribe-mate Joe Hunter. As part of a celebrity guest appearance with MrBeast, Devens volunteered to flip a coin and either add $1 million to the prize pool or face instant elimination. He called heads and won the coin flip, rewarding him with safety from elimination and an immunity idol, along with the doubling of the $1 million grand prize. As the season progressed, a lack of allies led to Devens being voted out and coming in 7th place.

=== Big Brother 28 ===
Following his appearance on Survivor 50: In the Hands of the Fans, Devens competed on the twenty-eighth season of Big Brother. Devens entered the house as an "Icon," alongside Survivor 45 winner Dee Valladares, and returning Big Brother 26 HouseGuest Angela Murray. On Day 87, Devens was crowned the winner of Big Brother 28 and voted America's Favorite HouseGuest, netting an extra $50,000. He also earned an additional $10,000 through the Pharaoh's Curse challenge on Day 74, making him the highest earning HouseGuest in the history of Big Brother, winning $810,000.

== Other appearances ==
Devens was set to make a brief appearance in James Gunn's Man of Tomorrow film, but dropped out due to competing on Big Brother.

== Personal life ==
In 2010, Devens met his wife, Becca. The two married in 2012. The couple has two children, Jackson, born in 2014 and Juliet, born in 2017.

== Filmography ==
Year	Title	Role	Note
2009–2019	WGXA Morning Show	Anchor/Producer	
2019	Survivor: Edge of Extinction	Contestant	4th place
2023	Game Changer	Guest judge	Season 5, episode 10
2026	Survivor 50: In the Hands of the Fans	Contestant	7th place
2026	Big Brother 28	Contestant	Winner

Preceded by Ashley Hollis	Winner of Big Brother; Season 28	Succeeded by —
