= WGXA =

Television station in Macon, Georgia, United States

- Macon, Georgia; United States
- Channels: Digital: 26 (UHF); Virtual: 24
- Branding: 24.1: WGXA Fox 24; 24.2: WGXA ABC 16; WGXA News

Programming
- Affiliations: 24.1: Fox; 24.2: ABC; for others, see § Subchannels

Ownership
- Owner: Sinclair Broadcast Group; (WGXA Licensee, LLC)

History
- First air date: April 21, 1982
- Former call signs: WWLG (CP, 1980–1982)
- Former channel numbers: Analog: 24 (UHF, 1982–2009); Digital: 16 (UHF, 2000–2019)
- Former affiliations: ABC (1982–1996); MyNetworkTV (secondary, 2006–2009)
- Call sign meaning: An X in the middle of "GA" represents "the crossroads of Middle Georgia", the region served

Technical information
- Licensing authority: FCC
- Facility ID: 58262
- ERP: 540 kW
- HAAT: 243 m (797 ft)
- Transmitter coordinates: 32°44′58.4″N 83°33′34.5″W

Links
- Public license information: Public file; LMS
- Website: wgxa.tv

WGXA (channel 24) is a television station in Macon, Georgia, United States, affiliated with Fox and ABC. Owned by Sinclair Broadcast Group, the station maintains studios on Martin Luther King Jr. Boulevard (GA 11/GA 22/GA 49/US 80/US 129) in downtown Macon, and its transmitter is located southeast of Macon on GA 87/US 23/US 129 ALT (Golden Isles Highway).

Established in 1982, WGXA was the third television station in Macon but emerged immediately as a more credible competitor than the longer-established WCWB-TV (channel 41) to locally dominant station WMAZ-TV (channel 13). Originally an affiliate of ABC, it was sold in 1995 to GOCOM Media and changed affiliations from ABC to Fox, with which it felt it could increase its local programming presence. An ABC subchannel was added in 2010 after the existing ABC affiliate balked at the network's programming. Local newscasts for the Fox and ABC subchannels are produced from WGXA's Macon newsroom.

== History ==
=== As a primary ABC affiliate ===
Aside from the brief existence of WETV/WNEX-TV/WOKA from 1953 to 1955, Macon had one commercial television station (WMAZ-TV, channel 13) between 1955 and 1968, when WCWB-TV (channel 41) signed on. WMAZ had been a secondary affiliate of ABC since 1954, but by the 1970s, Macon was among the largest markets remaining without full service from the three networks; only cable viewers or those capable of receiving stations from Atlanta or Columbus could see the full ABC schedule. An effort in 1970 to get WMCN-TV off the ground on channel 24 failed. It was not until later in the decade that movement started in earnest to bring Middle Georgia its third commercial TV station. A trio of WMAZ-TV employees—Lloyd Harris, Stan Carey, and Bill Manly—formed Broadcasting Dynamics and began planning a third station, which prompted WMAZ to fire them in September 1977.

A year later, Russell-Rowe Communications of Atlanta, headed by entrepreneurs Herman J. Russell and Howard Rowe, filed with the Federal Communications Commission (FCC) for a construction permit to build channel 24. Just days later, Rowe died, but Russell pressed on; they were joined by the Broadcasting Dynamics team, which had decided they did not have the money to pursue their own application. Middle Georgia Communications, owned by Julius Curtis Lewis Jr. of Savannah, also filed for channel 24, but it dropped its application in October 1979, clearing the way for Russell-Rowe to be awarded the permit in January 1980.

While Russell-Rowe hoped to name the station WROW in honor of the deceased Rowe, the first call letters on the construction permit were WWLG. This was soon dropped in favor of WGXA, which was easier to say and, according to general manager Ken Gerdes, "represent[ed] the crossroads of Middle Georgia". The station purchased the former site of the Brown Hotel in downtown Macon, while a tower was erected on the Cochran Short Route, near the other TV transmission facilities for the Macon area. While WGXA made its on-air debut on April 21, 1982, it was nowhere near fully ready. The studio was unlit; equipment was still in boxes, while other components had not yet arrived. Local commercials had to be edited in Atlanta or Columbus. The first local newscast did not air until October 18, six months later. With Rowe deceased, the owners of the station were Russell; real estate broker James Coclin; longtime Georgia broadcaster Don Elliot Heald, who had retired from WSB-TV in 1980; and M. B. "Bud" Seretean, former owner of the Atlanta Hawks.

In 1983, the station's first year on the air, channel 24 established itself in second place in Macon's television ratings. While it did not come close to approaching the commanding audience shares that WMAZ held for news and entertainment programming—each of WMAZ's newscasts attracted over half the audience—channel 24 was still slightly ahead of WMGT (the renamed WCWB-TV).

=== GOCOM ownership and switch to Fox ===
When we looked at the station, we wondered, 'What if?' What if enough money had been put into news, into promotion?

— Ric Gorman, president, GOCOM Media, on his attitude to operating WGXA

With Russell, Heald and Seretean all past retirement age, in February 1995, Russell-Rowe filed to sell WGXA to GOCOM Media of Charlotte, North Carolina, for $11.75 million. GOCOM closed on the sale in July; it replaced the management and announced an infusion of $1 million in cash and the hiring of 20 new staff for the station.

That September, GOCOM announced the station would switch network affiliations from ABC to Fox, a move that the company felt would allow the station to more effectively counterprogram WMAZ with a 10 p.m. local newscast and shows aimed at a younger audience. This displaced Register Communications-owned WPGA-TV (channel 58), which had begun airing Fox programming in December 1994; during the 1994 season, WGXA had aired the NFL on Fox. WPGA-TV aligned with ABC, setting up an affiliation switch for January 1, 1996. WGXA became one of nine Fox affiliates ranked number one or two in their markets. GOCOM received a $100 million cash infusion from Bain Capital in 1997. Two years later, GOCOM merged its ten-station portfolio with Atlanta-based Grapevine Communications; the company then changed its name to Piedmont Communications.

=== Frontier ownership and return of ABC ===
In 2007, Frontier Television Investors purchased WGXA-TV from Piedmont for $18.7 million, equivalent to $28.1 million in 2025 dollars. Under Frontier ownership, ABC returned from WPGA-TV after 13 years to a subchannel of WGXA beginning January 1, 2010. The move was precipitated by two factors, both involving WPGA-TV's owner, Lowell Register: he disapproved of a change by ABC regarding the institution of affiliation fees, and he also decried what he felt was an increasingly risqué program offering from ABC, telling a reporter for The Macon Telegraph, "I had somebody tell me they're running a good bit of gay and lesbian stuff on it." The new subchannel was branded as "ABC 16", reflecting the physical channel then used for WGXA's broadcasts.

The shift of ABC programming from WPGA-TV to the new WGXA-ABC subchannel led to a dispute between Cox Communications, the primary cable provider in Macon, and WPGA-TV. Register Communications contended that it continued to hold the rights to have WPGA broadcast as cable channel 6. Cox sought to place WGXA-ABC on that subchannel and believed it could do under the terms of its contract with Register. WPGA-TV won a temporary restraining order in late December to hold the position, leading to the ABC subchannel debuting on cable channel 16.

A district court dismissed the case, but Register appealed; on June 23, 2011, the Georgia Court of Appeals upheld the ruling enabling Cox to drop WPGA from its lineup and place WGXA-ABC on cable channel 6, which it did in July. (A final appeal by Register to the FCC ended when the commission found that WPGA's contract with Cox rendered it a station that elected retransmission consent.)

=== Sale to Sinclair ===
On March 24, 2014, Frontier Radio Management reached a deal to sell WGXA to Sinclair Broadcast Group for $33 million; the sale was completed on September 3, 2014.

== News operation ==
WGXA began producing local newscasts, branded News 24, on October 18, 1982. This brought the market back to two full-service television newsrooms; WCWB had, the month before, dropped its full-length newscasts to produce inserts into CNN Headline News. Nearly immediately, the station made a more credible showing than WCWB, attracting about half the audience of the dominant WMAZ.

In conjunction with the switch to Fox, the station expanded its local news programming with new weekend newscasts and invested in improved equipment as GOCOM sought to make the station more competitive against WMAZ. A morning newscast, News A.M., debuted in August 1997. Viewership grew among youth audiences for the newscasts. The station retained its early evening newscast at 5:30 p.m. until 2001, when it consolidated it with the 10 p.m. newscast as an hourlong program.

On March 1, 2010, an expansion of the WGXA newsroom began with a new 5:30 p.m. broadcast for the Fox subchannel and dedicated 7 and 11 p.m. newscasts on the ABC subchannel; the combined brand "NewsCentral" was adopted. From 2010 to 2012, the station aired a morning radio-television simulcast with WMAC (940 AM), featuring the same people that had been producing a similar show for WPGA radio and television.

In 2019, WGXA morning news anchor Rick Devens competed on the CBS reality show Survivor: Edge of Extinction.

WGXA previously handled production of a weeknight hour-long 10 p.m. newscast for sister station WFXL in Albany. Local reporters in the Albany area covered that region's news, which was presented from Macon. The WGXA news director also held that title for WFXL, and in 2022, WGXA was added to the portfolio of the general manager of WFXL and WACH-TV in Columbia, South Carolina. In March 2023, several newscasts were cut back at WGXA and replaced with Sinclair's national news program, The National Desk, accompanying a round of layoffs.

== Technical information ==
=== Subchannels ===
WGXA is broadcast from a transmitter southeast of Macon along GA 87/US 23/US 129 ALT. Its signal is multiplexed:

Subchannels of WGXA
| Subchannel | Res. | Short name | Programming |
|---|---|---|---|
| 24.1 | 720p | FOX | Fox |
| 24.2 | 720p | ABC | ABC |
| 24.3 | 480i | Charge! | Charge! |
| 24.4 | 480i | Comet | Comet |

WGXA's broadcasts became digital-only, effective June 12, 2009. The station relocated its signal from channel 16 to channel 26 in 2019, as a result of the 2016 United States wireless spectrum auction.
