= Big Brother 24 (American season) =

Big Brother
- Season 24
- Promotional poster for Big Brother 24
- Hosted by: Julie Chen Moonves
- No. of days: 82
- No. of houseguests: 16
- Winner: Taylor Hale
- Runner-up: Monte Taylor
- America's Favorite HouseGuest: Taylor Hale
- No. of episodes: 35

Release
- Original network: CBS
- Original release: July 6 – September 25, 2022

Season chronology
- ← Previous; Season 23 Next → Season 25

Big Brother 24 is the twenty-fourth season of the American reality television program Big Brother. The season featured a music festival theme. It premiered on July 6, 2022, on CBS in the United States and Global in Canada. Hosted by Julie Chen Moonves, the show follows a group of contestants (known as HouseGuests), who live in a house together while being constantly filmed and having no communication with the outside world as they compete to win a grand prize of $750,000.

The season ran for 82 days, ending on September 25, 2022. Taylor Hale was crowned the winner, defeating Monte Taylor in an 8-1 jury vote. Hale became the first black female HouseGuest to win, as well as the second black HouseGuest to win in the main edition of the show; she was also voted America's Favorite HouseGuest, becoming the first winner to also claim this award and the $50,000 prize that comes with it. On September 25, 2022, CBS renewed the series for a twenty-fifth season.

== Format ==
Big Brother follows a group of contestants, known as HouseGuests, who live inside a custom-built house outfitted with cameras and microphones recording their every move 24 hours a day. The HouseGuests are sequestered with no contact with the outside world. During their stay, the HouseGuests share their thoughts on their day-to-day lives inside the house in a private room known as the Diary Room. Each week, the HouseGuests compete in competitions in order to win power and safety inside the house. At the start of each week, the HouseGuests compete in a Head of Household (abbreviated as "HOH") competition. The winner of the HoH competition is immune from eviction and selects two HouseGuests to be nominated for eviction. Six HouseGuests are then selected to compete in the Power of Veto (abbreviated as "PoV") competition: the reigning HoH, the nominees, and three other HouseGuests chosen by random draw. The winner of the PoV competition has the right to either revoke the nomination of one of the nominated HouseGuests or leave them as is. If the veto winner uses this power, the HoH must immediately nominate another HouseGuest for eviction. The PoV winner is also immune from being named as the replacement nominee. On eviction night, all HouseGuests vote to evict one of the nominees, though the Head of Household and the nominees are not allowed to vote. This vote is conducted in the privacy of the Diary Room. In the event of a tie, the Head of Household casts the tie-breaking vote. The nominee with the most votes is evicted from the house. The last nine evicted HouseGuests comprise the Jury and are sequestered in a separate location following their eviction and ultimately decide the winner of the season. The Jury is only allowed to see the competitions and ceremonies that include all of the remaining HouseGuests; they are not shown any interviews or other footage that might include strategy or details regarding nominations. The viewing public is able to award an additional prize by choosing "America's Favorite HouseGuest." All evicted HouseGuests are eligible to win this award except for those who either voluntarily leave or are forcibly removed for rule violations.

=== Format changes and additions ===
==== Backstage Boss ====
On Night 1, one HouseGuest randomly selected the Backstage Boss Pass. This player would be granted immunity for the week, but could not be nominated, lost eligibility to participate in the week's competitions, and could not vote on eviction night. This player also had to choose three other HouseGuests to join them Backstage. These HouseGuests would also be safe from nomination, lost eligibility to participate in the week's competitions, and could not vote on eviction night. However, the three Backstage HouseGuests were not granted immunity and would still be eligible for eviction. On eviction night, the HouseGuest voted off by the house would have gone in a head-to-head battle against one of the Backstage HouseGuests. An online public vote was held for America to grant one of the three Backstage HouseGuests immunity from eviction for the week. The loser of the competition between the house evictee and the selected Backstage HouseGuest would immediately become evicted.

Pooch ended up claiming the Backstage Boss Pass and as a result was required to select three HouseGuests to join him Backstage. Pooch selected Alyssa, Brittany, and Paloma to join him. Brittany won the majority of the public vote and would have been granted immunity for the week had the twist not been cancelled. Since Paloma chose to leave the game, the twist was cancelled.

==== Festie Besties ====
Starting in Week 3, the HouseGuests competed in sets, similarly to the Duos Twist in season 13. The HouseGuest who was named Head of Household earned immunity for their Besties, and was obligated to nominate another set of Besties for eviction. Three sets of Besties would compete for the Power of Veto: the HOH's set, the nominated set, and another set selected by random draw. Only one person from the winning set needed to decide to use the Power of Veto in order to save the nominated set of Besties. Should that happen, the entire set of Besties would be saved, forcing the HoH to nominate another set as replacements. After each eviction, the surviving Bestie chose a new set of Besties to join. The sets are listed below.

Summary of Festie Besties
Week 3	Week 4	Week 5
Alyssa and Indy	Alyssa and Indy	Alyssa, Indy, and Taylor
Brittany and Michael	Brittany and Michael	Brittany and Michael
Daniel and Kyle	Daniel and Kyle	Daniel and Kyle
Jasmine and Turner	Jasmine and Turner	Jasmine and Turner
Joseph and Monte	Joseph, Monte, and Terrance	Joseph, Monte, and Terrance
Nicole and Taylor	Nicole and Taylor	Nicole evicted
Ameerah and Terrance	Ameerah evicted	

==== Split House Double Eviction ====
Following Week 6's eviction, the house was split into two groups of five that had no interaction for the entire week. The winner of the HOH competition became the HOH for Big BroChella, occurring in the house, while the second-place finisher became HOH of Dyre Fest, occurring outside. The remaining houseguests were split via a school yard pick by the respective HOHs. A full week of events played out for each group, with their own competitions, nominations, and evictions. Ultimately, two HouseGuests were evicted at the end of Week 7. The groups are listed below:

Split House
Big BroChella	Dyre Fest
Michael	Terrance
Brittany; Jasmine; Monte; Taylor	Alyssa; Joseph; Kyle; Turner

== HouseGuests ==
The cast of the twenty-fourth season of Big Brother Top: Kyle, Terrance, Monte and Michael Middle: Brittany, Taylor, Jasmine, Alyssa, Ameerah, Matt, Nicole, and Daniel Bottom: Pooch, Paloma, Indy, and Joseph

The HouseGuests for the twenty-fourth season were revealed on July 5, 2022. US Weekly published a series of cast interviews on the same day. Prior to the reveal, CBS aired a teaser featuring various voice clips from the HouseGuests. The cast includes Miss Michigan USA 2021 and Miss USA 2021 competitor Taylor Hale. Marvin Achi, a 28-year-old from Houston, Texas, was among the sixteen HouseGuests initially slated to be on the season, but was removed from the cast and replaced by Joseph Abdin.

Name	Age	Occupation	Residence	Result
Taylor Hale	27	Personal stylist	West Bloomfield, Michigan	Winner; Day 82
Monte Taylor	27	Personal trainer	Bear, Delaware	Runner-up; Day 82
Matt Turner	23	Thrift store owner	New Bedford, Massachusetts	Evicted; Day 82
Brittany Hoopes	32	Hypnotherapist	Austin, Texas	Evicted; Day 79
Alyssa Snider	24	Marketing representative	Siesta Key, Florida	Evicted; Day 72
Michael Bruner	28	Attorney	Rochester, Minnesota	Evicted; Day 65
Terrance Higgins	47	Bus operator	Chicago, Illinois	Evicted; Day 65
Kyle Capener	29	Unemployed	Bountiful, Utah	Evicted; Day 58
Joseph Abdin	24	Lawyer	Lake Worth Beach, Florida	Evicted; Day 51
Jasmine Davis	29	Entrepreneur	Atlanta, Georgia	Evicted; Day 51
Indiana "Indy" Santos	31	Corporate flight attendant	Los Angeles, California	Evicted; Day 44
Daniel Durston	35	Vegas performer	Las Vegas, Nevada	Evicted; Day 37
Nicole Layog	41	Private chef	Fort Lauderdale, Florida	Evicted; Day 30
Ameerah Jones	31	Content designer	Westminster, Maryland	Evicted; Day 23
Joe "Pooch" Pucciarelli	24	Assistant football coach	Boca Raton, Florida	Evicted; Day 16
Paloma Aguilar	22	Interior designer	San Marcos, California	Walked; Day 8

=== Future appearances ===
In 2023, Ameerah Jones, Alyssa Snider, and Monte Taylor all competed on the second season of The Challenge: USA. Taylor Hale competed on the Christmas spin-off Big Brother: Reindeer Games.

In 2025, Joseph Abdin, Taylor Hale, and Matt Turner competed on The Amazing Race 38. Abdin was partnered with his brother, Turner was partnered with his wife, and Hale was partnered with Big Brother 23 HouseGuest, Kyland Young.

After making several other re-appearances on later Big Brother seasons to provide commentary and host Jury Roundtable segments, Hale began the bi-weekly Big Brother: Unlocked companion show as a co-host with Derrick Levasseur in 2025. The show's second season added Jerry O'Connell alongside them.

In 2027, Hale competed on the sixth season of The Traitors.

== Episodes ==
No. overall	No. in season	Title	Day(s)	Original release date	U.S. viewers (millions)	Rating (18–49)
Week 1
821	1	"Episode 1"	Day 1	July 6, 2022	3.84	0.8
Sixteen HouseGuests entered the house and claimed tickets, which assigned them to one of three challenges for the first Head of Household (HoH) competition. Paloma, Jasmine, Monte, Kyle, and Nicole were sent to the porta-potties where they heard a series of audio conversations with repeating numbers, and had to determine which number was said most often. Monte won the challenge. Taylor, Turner, Brittany, Joseph, and Terrance were sent to the piercing tent where they had to accurately clip pieces of jewelry to their faces according to a guide. Turner won the challenge. Michael, Alyssa, Daniel, Indy, and Ameerah were sent to the merchandise stand, where they held onto shirts as they were lifted from the ground, and would be eliminated if they fell. Daniel won the challenge. Pooch received the Backstage Boss ticket and did not compete. Monte, Turner, and Daniel then competed to assemble a puzzle. Daniel completed the puzzle first and became HoH. Julie then revealed that Pooch would be sent "backstage" for the week, could not be nominated for eviction, was ineligible to compete in the week's competitions, and could not vote on eviction night. Additionally, he selected Alyssa, Brittany, and Paloma to join him.
822	2	"Episode 2"	Days 1–3	July 10, 2022	3.41	0.7
After the HOH competition, houseguests began socializing for the first time. Paloma formed an all girls alliance with Alyssa, Brittany, Indy, and Jasmine called "Girls Girls". Daniel and Nicole formed a final two deal, in which they call themselves "The Rogue Rats". After speaking with the other houseguests, Daniel nominated Michael and Terrance for eviction.
823	3	"Episode 3"	Days 3–6	July 13, 2022	3.46	0.7
Following the nomination ceremony, Daniel assured Terrance that Michael is his intended target. Michael attempted to find people who would take him down if they won the Power of Veto (PoV) before coming to the conclusion that he needs to win it for himself. Players were then chosen for the PoV competition: Daniel, Michael, Terrance, Indy, Turner, and Ameerah. In the competition, HouseGuests competed two at a time by collecting metal rings on a foam lance while on artificial horses. After a tiebreaker round, Michael defeated Ameerah and won the Power of Veto. The "Girls Girls" alliance began to worry about possible alliances forming between male members of the house, much to Taylor's dismay. Taylor approached Monte and Joseph about their worry, who then talked to Paloma about Taylor's allegations. Paloma denied them and pitched the idea of evicting Taylor. On Day 6, Michael used the PoV to remove himself from the block and Daniel nominated Taylor in his place.
824	4	"Episode 4"	Days 6–9	July 14, 2022	3.21	0.7
Taylor and Paloma speak after the nomination ceremony and Taylor begins trying to secure votes to keep her safe. Following a conversation with Ameerah, Taylor attempts to clear things up with Monte and Paloma. On Day 8, Paloma voluntarily quit the game after experiencing mental health struggles in the house. The other HouseGuests were informed of her decision and take part in a group prayer for her. Julie reveals that the backstage twist would have culminated in an eviction competition between one of the nominees, voted on by HouseGuests eligible for voting, and one of the backstage HouseGuests, decided on by a viewer vote. The loser of the competition would have been immediately evicted. However, due to Paloma leaving, both the backstage twist and the first eviction was cancelled. The HouseGuests then participated in the next Head of Household competition, which was split into two parts. In "Bye Bye Backstage" HouseGuests competed in pairs to race across an obstacle course in an attempt to "leave" the backstage area. Michael, Taylor, Joseph, Ameerah, Jasmine, Kyle, and Monte were the first seven to make it to the other side in each competition and progressed to the second part.
Week 2
825	5	"Episode 5"	Days 8–10	July 17, 2022	3.34	0.6
Jasmine receives treatment for a rolled ankle she obtained during the first part of the HoH competition while other members of the house rethink their alliances with Paloma gone. Daniel feels at risk because none of the three people he nominated during his HoH reign were evicted. The seven HouseGuests that made it to the second part of the HoH competition then competed in the "BB Pie Eating Contest." In each round competitors were asked true or false questions about decorations inside the house and had to answer by searching through their pie, using only their mouths, for a T or F. Each round the pies got larger in size and the first HouseGuests to answer correctly moved to the next round. In the final round, Jasmine answered correctly first against Michael and became the next Head of Household. Pooch wants to be nominated as a pawn and so that Taylor can be backdoored. Meanwhile, Ameerah proposes to Alyssa and Michael that they evict Pooch instead by supporting his plan but not using the veto on him. Jasmine however, does not trust Pooch and therefore dislikes his plan. On Day 10, Jasmine nominated Pooch and Taylor for eviction.
826	6	"Episode 6"	Days 10–13	July 20, 2022	3.54	0.7
The Girls Girls alliance, with Taylor, explain to Jasmine their plan to evict Pooch. Jasmine agrees as long as nominations stay the same after the veto. Taylor plans to still win the veto for herself to guarantee her own safety. Pooch and Joseph develop a significant "bromance" from their time spent together in the house. Players were then picked for the Power of Veto competition. Ameerah, Michael, and Terrance were chosen to compete alongside Jasmine, Pooch, and Taylor, as the Head of Household and two nominees. Taylor hopes that Michael will use the veto on her if he wins, while Jasmine does not want have to name a replacement nominee. In the "Mermaid Fest" Power of Veto competition the competitors, dressed as mermaids, used their heads to push a pearl over a series of ramps, and then into a hole at the end of a bowling lane. Michael was the first person to collect a pearl into each of his three holes and received the Power of Veto. On Day 13, Michael chose not to use the Power of Veto, leaving Jasmine's nominees the same.
827	7	"Episode 7"	Days 10, 13–17	July 24, 2022 (Note: Episode 7 was originally scheduled to air on July 21, 2022. However, it was pre-empted for the January 6 United States Capitol attack hearings and rescheduled to July 22. It was later moved once more to July 24 to air in a two-hour timeslot with Episode 8.)	3.36	0.7
828	8	"Episode 8"	Days 10, 13–17	July 24, 2022	3.36	0.7
Pooch and Taylor continue to both believe that they are just pawns and will not be evicted. Meanwhile, a "showmance" begins forming between Alyssa and Kyle causing Alyssa to inform him about the Girls Girls alliance. Taylor discusses with Ameerah, wanting to backdoor Monte in a future week. Because of their alliance, Ameerah tells Monte what Taylor wants to do, and the two discuss with Nicole whom they should ultimately vote to evict. Pooch and Taylor are each given one last chance to attempt to save themselves by giving a speech. On Day 16, by a unanimous vote of twelve, Pooch was the first HouseGuest to be evicted from the house. In his exit interview with Julie, Pooch stated that he underestimated the women in the house. The "Festie Besties" twist was then introduced to the game. Julie informed the HouseGuests that going forward, they would be playing the game with a partner, known as a "Bestie". The partner of the HouseGuest that won Head of Household will be safe for the week; HouseGuests will also be nominated and play for Power of Veto in pairs, but evicted independently. HouseGuests then participated in the next Head of Household competition. HouseGuests have to hold down buttons on a "lighter" until the music playing stops when they must sit down in a chair as fast as possible. The last HouseGuest to sit down, or those who let go of their button before the music stopped, in each round were eliminated from the competition and had to choose a partner. Turner was the first HouseGuest to sit down in the final round and became the next Head of Household. He was then paired with Jasmine, the last person remaining without a partner, guaranteeing her safety for the week. Turner considers nominating Ameerah or Nicole, because he views them both as threats and wants to get revenge for Pooch's eviction. The Po's Pack alliance, consisting of Alyssa, Nicole, Ameerah, Kyle, Michael, and Monte, agree to prioritize the alliance since they are all paired with members outside of it. Alyssa and Indy were chosen to be have-nots for the week by Jasmine. Nicole wants Turner to nominate Brittany and Michael and eventually be nominated herself, so that the Po's Pack can backdoor Taylor. Turner ultimately sets his sights on Brittany and Michael or Nicole and Taylor. On Day 17, Turner nominated Brittany and Michael for eviction.
Week 3
829	9	"Episode 9"	Days 17–20	July 27, 2022	3.77	0.8
Having been picked to compete with Taylor in the Veto competition, Nicole broke down crying, agonizing over whether to throw the competition. The house was worried about this emotional display, coming so soon after Paloma's departure, and Taylor tried to assure Nicole that she would support whatever decision she made. Nicole interpreted this as a hint to quit the game, and she angrily related the episode to other HouseGuests, including Daniel, who confronted Taylor, accusing her of having caused Paloma to quit the game and of trying to do the same with Nicole. Taylor was left in tears. For the Veto competition, each team needed to construct a puzzle on top of a pole. As one team member ran for the pieces, the other was lifted upwards. The first team to complete the puzzle would win the Power of Veto. Just before the competition started, Jasmine fainted due to her fear of heights. After she regained consciousness, Jasmine and Turner opted out of the competition, leaving just two teams to battle for the Power of Veto. Nicole did not need to work too hard to throw the competition, and Michael and Brittany won the Power of Veto. After the Veto competition, Taylor is distraught but is told by Monte to meet in the HOH room later that night. Joseph, Turner, Michael, Taylor, Brittany, Monte, and Kyle recognize they are on the outs in the game and band together to form the Leftovers alliance and plan to blindside and evict Ameerah.
830	10	"Episode 10"	Days 20–23	July 28, 2022	3.56	0.8
Brittany and Michael used the PoV to remove themselves from the block. Turner then named Ameerah and Terrance as replacement nominees, coming as a shock to most of the Po's Pack alliance. Terrance requested that they vote to evict him rather than Ameerah, but the Leftovers' alliance believed they had the numbers to evict Ameerah. Ameerah and Terrance were each given a chance to speak as an attempt save themselves. On Day 23, by a vote of 7–4, with Alyssa, Indy, Jasmine, and Nicole voting to evict Terrance, Ameerah was evicted from the Big Brother house. Julie then informed the nominees that each week, the surviving Besties would be able to join another group, becoming a trio, but that all other aspects of the twist would still be in play. Terrance opted to join Joseph and Monte. The HouseGuests then participated in the next HoH competition, based on the upcoming film The Invitation. 1,500 envelopes fell from the air and HouseGuests searched them to find an "invitation" to the second part of the competition. The first eight to do so were allowed to move forward. Jasmine was the first to find an invitation, followed by Terrance and Brittany.
Week 4
831	11	"Episode 11"	Days 20, 22–24	July 31, 2022	4.07	0.8
The eight houseguests (Jasmine, Terrance, Brittany, Monte, Daniel, Joseph, Nicole, Alyssa) who found an invitation competed in round 2 of the HOH competition, which was a form of table shuffleboard using glasses full of "blood". Monte scored the most points and became the new HOH. Monte and the Leftovers Alliance plans to target and backdoor Nicole, but does not want Taylor to go on the block again for the third time if she is not comfortable. On Day 24, Monte nominated Alyssa and Indy for eviction, with the main plan to backdoor Nicole if he gets Taylor's approval.
832	12	"Episode 12"	Days 24–27	August 3, 2022	3.83	0.8
After nominations, Brittany, Michael, and Taylor discuss their danger in game moving forward. Daniel and Kyle are selected to compete in the veto competition Trippy Watch Party. In this competition, one bestie answered questions regarding a story seen by the remaining besties after eating "psychedelic slop". Daniel and Kyle won the veto competition. Kyle wanted to use the veto on Alyssa, but the Michael and Brittany convince the Leftovers that it was best to leave the current nominees on the block to protect their alliance next week, as Brittany and Michael are the only Festie Besties not insulated by a pawn. Just before the veto ceremony, Monte tells Daniel and Nicole that the veto should not be used because the votes to save Nicole may not be there. Thinking Monte is lying, Daniel and Nicole decide to go against the HOH's wishes, though this means Daniel is ultimately backdooring his closest ally. At the veto ceremony, Daniel and Kyle use their vetoes, and Monte nominates Nicole and Taylor, much to Taylor's dismay.
833	13	"Episode 13"	Days 27–30	August 4, 2022	3.60	0.7
The house remains on edge as there are players trying to determine who was exactly involved in backdooring Ameerah. Nicole and Daniel try to fish out who exactly was involved, where they were able to identify 6 of the 7 members of the "Leftovers" alliance. While Nicole is trying to garner votes to stay, she exposes her past as a former police officer of 10 years to the "Girls Girls" alliance (Alyssa, Indy, Jasmine) where she was actually a detectective for two of those years. Also, the showmance heats up between Alyssa and Kyle after the veto was used to take Alyssa off the block, even though Kyle and his alliance were intending to take Alyssa out. On Day 30, Nicole failed to convince people to vote for her to stay, so she was evicted 9-1, with Daniel being the sole vote to save her. With Taylor needing to choose a new Festie Bestie group, she decides to join Alyssa and Indy.
Week 5
834	14	"Episode 14"	Days 30–31	August 7, 2022	3.96	0.8
Following Nicole's exit, Daniel's emotions get the better of him as he starts to tell the house, "You all can't split the $750,000 cash prize! Start playing for yourselves!" and further lashes out at Monte. As the new HOH competition is being set up, he confronts Monte as being set up well in this game in front of the whole house and as the mastermind/manipulator who got Nicole evicted and claims "Either You or Michael are going to make it to the Final Two. Good job man! Keep up the good work!" which Monte did not take lightly. Daniel further inquires why they moved to get Nicole out, where he told Daniel it was his own fault his friend is gone. The next HOH is competition is announced as BB Fest Pooch-a-palooza: Mind Your Step, which is a balance beam obstacle course. Michael edges out Daniel to win his first HOH of the season. In an attempt to cover their tracks, the "Leftovers" concoct a plan to nominate Joseph, Monte and Terrance in an attempt to hide their alliance. On day 31, Michael sticks to the plan and nominates Joseph, Monte and Terrance for eviction.
835	15	"Episode 15"	Days 31–34	August 10, 2022	3.86	0.8
Following the nomination ceremony, and with nowhere or nobody to turn to, Daniel attempts to convince Michael and the house to target Monte. After talking with Terrance, the two are on the same page and Terrance is convinced to throw the Veto Competition. Michael selects the third team competing in the Veto, Turner and Jasmine. OTEV is back for the Veto competition: Get My Sauce. It comes down to Terrance and Michael, where Terrance throws the final round to let Michael win his 4th POV of the season. Once the competition is over, Daniel and Terrance start to work on convincing the group outside the "Leftovers" alliance to target Monte, who in turn agree and attempt to approach Michael one at a time. Michael does not like their approach, as he feels like they are trying to use him to do their "dirty work". At the Veto Ceremony, Michael and Brittany elect to use the POV and remove Joseph, Monte and Terrance from the nomination block. Michael then nominates Daniel and Kyle, and in his speech calls Daniel out for rubbing the house the wrong way.
836	16	"Episode 16"	Days 27, 30, 34–37	August 11, 2022	3.63	0.8
After the events of the veto meeting, Daniel becomes aware that Kyle is a part of a larger alliance, originally referred to as "The Sorry Six" by him and Nicole. Despite efforts to save himself, Daniel became the fifth evicted houseguest by a vote of 8-1, with Terrance voting for Kyle. Following his eviction, Julie announced that the Festie Bestie twist was officially over and the jury phase was officially beginning. The remaining houseguests, excluding Michael, began competing in the sixth HOH challenge. Houseguests must hold onto a wall for as long as they can in a challenge titled "Conspiracy Fest".
Week 6
837	17	"Episode 17"	Days 37–38	August 14, 2022	3.95	0.8
Following Daniel's exit, the houseguests finish participating in the HOH competition. When four are left (Indy, Kyle, Taylor and Joseph), Indy drops and Kyle and Joseph drop so they are unable to get blood on their hands for the week, making Taylor the new HOH. Taylor begins deciding what she wants to do with her HOH reign and seeks help from The Leftovers. She initially does not want to nominate a woman so she insists on nominate two of her alliance members, Monte and Turner, instead. However she does not go through with this, and instead nominates Indy and Terrance for eviction.
838	18	"Episode 18"	Days 38–40	August 17, 2022	4.06	0.9
Indy reacts rather upset at the fact she was nominated, given Taylor told her she would be safe. At the veto competition, Taylor, Indy, Terrance, Alyssa, Jasmine and Kyle all partake in a challenge where they must score a certain amount of points with a ball, whoever has the fewest points after each round is eliminated, and is able to claim a prize, one of which is the Power of Veto. With Taylor still not sure what her plans are, she threatens Alyssa to take the veto instead of her trip to London, however Alyssa takes her trip anyways which upsets Taylor. Kyle wins the power of veto, and is spoken to by The Leftovers to use the veto on one of Indy or Terrance, so Taylor can easily backdoor Alyssa after holding a grudge against her for taking her trip away from her.
839	19	"Episode 19"	Days 40–44	August 18, 2022	3.41	0.7
The Leftovers continue to pressure Kyle into using the veto to save one of the nominations, so they will be able to backdoor his showmance Alyssa. However he decides not to use the Power of Veto. After this, and exposing his four person alliance within The Leftovers known as "The Pound", which includes himself, Joseph, Monte and Turner, Michael and Brittany wonder if sticking with The Leftovers is their best interest moving forward. At the eviction, Indy is evicted by a vote of 7-1, with Michael voting to evict Terrance, becoming the first member of the jury. Julie reveals a new twist to the houseguests, where they will be split into two groups, one outside and one inside, and will partake in a weeks worth of game simultaneously. An HOH competition is played by the houseguests, excluding Taylor, Terrance became the runner-up and therefore the HOH of the outside group, while Michael won the competition and therefore became the HOH of the inside group. Note: This is the first live eviction episode to include a live studio audience since the finale of Big Brother 21.
Week 7
840	20	"Episode 20"	Days 44–45	August 21, 2022	3.95	0.8
Following Indy's exit, each Head of Household was tasked to pick their groups in a school yard pick style. At the end, Michael had picked Jasmine, Brittany, Taylor and Monte, while Terrance picked Turner, Alyssa, Joseph and Kyle. Split into two groups of five that have no interaction for the entire week. One group, Big BroChella (Michael's group), was sent to live inside the house for the week, while the other, Dyre Fest (Terrance's group), was sent to live outside in the backyard. At Big BroChella, Monte volunteers to be a pawn for Michael to easily vote out Jasmine, who now realizes that she has nobody to help her this week and is likely going home. Meanwhile in Dyre Fest, Terrance speaks with each of his group members individually and Kyle spills the beans of The Leftovers to Terrance and Alyssa. Kyle and Alyssa agree to work with Terrance to ensure that his target Joseph is evicted. At the nomination ceremonies, Michael nominates Jasmine and Monte, while Terrance nominates Joseph and Turner.
841	21	"Episode 21"	Days 45–48	August 24, 2022	3.99	0.9
Following Big BroChella nomination ceremony, Jasmine states that she will fight for the veto to take herself down. Tiffany from Big Brother 23 returned to host the Big BroChella Veto Competition, "One, Two, Three, VIP", which was an iteration of "Stay of Fold". Brittany won the Power of Veto. The Leftovers inside discuss if anyone at Dyre Fest has turned on the alliance. At the Big BroChella Veto Ceremony, Brittany decided not to use the Veto. After the Dyre Fest nomination ceremony, Joseph suspects that he is Terrance's target. Terrance justifies his nomination to Joseph and Turner by telling them Kyle is the target, and Joseph, Kyle, and Turner discuss how they can keep the Leftovers intact. The Dyre Fest attendees set up and competed in the Veto competition "Lunch is Served", which required the houseguests to transport 50 styrofoam containers from the start to their platform without dropping any. Terrance completed this the fastest and won the POV, securing all the power for the week. Kyle works to keep the target on Joseph, and Terrance reveals that Kyle outed the Leftovers and wants Joseph out. At the veto ceremony, Terrance decided to use the Veto on Turner and nominate Kyle in his place, in hopes that Joseph and Kyle will continue to expose each other's games if they are on the block.
842	22	"Episode 22"	Days 48–51	August 25, 2022	3.52	0.8
At Big BroChella, Jasmine states that she has a fighting chance of staying against Monte, but worries that she does not have a strong relationship with Brittany or Taylor. She plans to play up her injury in hopes to gain some sympathy. Jasmine, Michael, and Taylor theorize how the week at Dyre Fest is playing out. At the Big BroChella eviction, Jasmine is evicted by a vote of 2-0, becoming the second juror. At Dyre Fest, Joseph attempts to fight to stay in the game. When Joseph is called to the Diary Room, the remaining Dyre Fest attendees decide to stick together once the house merges again and form "The After Party". Joseph, with the encouragement of Terrance, calls a house meeting to try and clear his name, but the house quickly turns on him and exposes his game. At the Dyre Fest eviction, Joseph is evicted by a vote of 2-0, becoming the third juror. After the Dyre Fest eviction, Julie announces that the Split House twist is over, and the remaining houseguest are reunited.
Week 8
843	23	"Episode 23"	Days 51–52	August 28, 2022	4.01	0.8
Following Jasmine and Joseph's evictions, the remaining houseguests are reunited and recount their respective weeks. The Head of Household Competition "Carni-Small", the houseguests had to stack 21 mini energy drinks in a specific order. Turner won the competition, winning his second HOH of the summer. Turner decided to remain with the newly formed After Party alliance after Joseph revealed that Brittany, Michael, and Taylor were working closely within the Leftovers. At the nomination ceremony, Turner nominated Brittany and Taylor, with a plan to backdoor Michael due to his competition ability.
844	24	"Episode 24"	Days 52–54	August 31, 2022	3.80	0.8
After the nominations, Turner explains his reasoning for his nominations to former Leftover allies. Michael and Brittany discuss previous conversations with Kyle in which Kyle theorized that the houseguest of racial minorities were aligned due to their backgrounds and had to factor into his decision, despite many of these being closely aligned with him. They express discontent in protecting Kyle by not revealing this information and allowing it to impact the game, acknowledging that they should have done so when these conversation started. Alyssa, Monte, and Michael were selected to compete in the Power of Veto competition. In a video message from Billy Eichner and Luke Macfarlane, the houseguests learned that the winner of the PoV competition would also get a private screening with three guests of their new movie, Bros. The competition, "BB Rom Com Fest", required the houseguest to fill a large container with wine while sliding across a slipper slope. Michael won the competition and selected Turner, Alyssa and Taylor to see the movie with him. Michael planned to use the veto on his ally Brittany, and after suspecting that Kyle was in on a plan to backdoor him or Monte, they decide to tell the house about Kyle's suggestion to consider creating an all-white alliance. They first inform Monte and Taylor, asking if they are comfortable with this issue coming to light. Brittany and Michael inform Alyssa and then Turner, hoping to make Kyle the replacement nominee. However, a misunderstanding by Terrance accidentally tips off Kyle what is going on. Alyssa informs Kyle of the situation, but he denies the accusation and fears for the repercussions to his game and life after Big Brother.
845	25	"Episode 25"	Days 54–58	September 1, 2022	3.68	0.8
Kyle confronts Brittany about the accusation, denying he suggested an all-white alliance and wondering why she did not address him first. Brittany reminded him of her discomfort to the idea which caused him to double down, and she struggled with how to handle this information. Kyle later speaks to Monte and Terrance to explain himself. A tearful Monte expresses his feeling betrayed since he was consistently loyalty to Kyle from early in the game. Terrance explains that Kyle's biases ended Joseph's game despite him fighting for Kyle. Later, Monte questions the convenient timing of the revelation despite Brittany and Michael being aware for weeks. A house meeting is called to openly talk through the situation. Kyle confesses again and acknowledges that his sheltered upbringing has left him with unconscious biases that he has to work through. He points out that Brittany and Michael seemed to be on board with the plan rather than being direct about their discomfort. Brittany retorts that they never agreed to it, and Michael says that Kyle's plan of action was not acceptable. Terrance pushes back, feeling this was used as game strategy due to them withholding this from those who would be affected by it. They defend that they wanted to wait until after the house was reuniting, but Terrance reminds them that knew this well before the split. Monte and Taylor express concern and love for Kyle and want to help him learn and grow by addressing racial biases rather than deny and avoid the issue. Kyle respectfully declares his game over and asks the house not to isolate him but to be transparent with him moving forward. At the veto ceremony, Michael used the veto on Brittany. Turner named Kyle the replacement nominee. Kyle was later evicted unanimously.
Week 9
846	26	"Episode 26"	Days 58–59	September 4, 2022	3.27	0.5
Following Kyle's eviction, the houseguests compete in "Burner Bot". The competition involved carrying puzzle pieces across the yard and assembling the puzzle on a platform. Michael wins his third Head of Household, and Zingbot arrives to deliver Zings to the houseguests. The houseguests discuss Michael competition dominance and desire to get him out if given the chance. Michael and Brittany discuss whom to target, wanting to keep Turner safe due to the events of last week. At the nomination ceremony, Michael nominates Alyssa and a laughing Terrance, with the latter being his target.
847	27	"Episode 27"	Days 59–62	September 7, 2022	3.83	0.8
After nominations, Michael assures Alyssa that she is not the target. Terrance tells Michael that he wants to go to jury and work to poison the jurors against him. Terrance also states that Turner, the previous HOH, had to be the one with the plan to backdoor him last week. After Monte and Alyssa were picked at the veto draw, Monte and Terrance choose Taylor over Turner via houseguest's choice due to taking the fall for his failed backdoor plan last week. Turner worries he is getting backdoored. The houseguests, sans Turner, compete in "BB Comics". Michael wins his 6th Power of Veto, breaking the single season record for Vetos and tying the single season competition record. Brittany pitches taking out Michael to Turner, who agrees he is too big of a threat. Brittany relays this to Michael, continuing to pitch that the target should shift to a bigger threat. Turner also relays this information to Michael, throwing Brittany under the bus. Michael decides to stick to his original plan and does not use the Power of Veto.
848	28	"Episode 28"	Days 62–65	September 8, 2022	3.17	0.7
Terrance attempts to rally votes, namely Taylor's, but the house confirms that they want Terrance out over Alyssa. Jasmine and Joseph arrive at Jury and share details from the Split House Twist with Indy. Kyle later arrives and explains why he left the game, leading to a heated discussion between the jurors. At the first eviction of the night, Terrance is evicted by a vote of 4–0. After Terrance's eviction, Julie informs the houseguests that it is double eviction night. The houseguests compete in "Laser Focus", a memory competition involving sequences of colors. Turner win the competition, winning his third Head of Household. He decides to nominate Alyssa and Brittany, planning to target Brittany. All of the houseguests compete in the Power of Veto competition, called "Amp it Up". The competition required the houseguest to untangle enough of their cable by climbing through a turntable to plug their cable into the amp. Monte was the first to reach his amp, winning his first PoV of the summer. Despite making a deal with Michael prior, Monte realizes this may be the only chance to take him out. Monte uses the veto on Alyssa, and Turner names Michael the replacement nominee to "open up first place". Michael makes a last minute attempt to stay by exposing his closest ally Brittany. However, his threat level was too high, and he was evicted by a vote of 3-0.
Week 10
849	29	"Episode 29"	Days 65–66	September 11, 2022	4.05	0.8
The houseguests calm down a tearful Brittany following the double eviction and celebrate making Final 5. In the HOH competition, "Horror Fest Lockdown", the players had to block six doors in complete darkness in the fastest time. Monte is crowned Head of Household. Monte promises safety to his allies, Taylor and Turner. Both want to backdoor the other, but Monte tells them they will have to do it themselves. Monte nominates Alyssa and Brittany for eviction.
850	30	"Episode 30"	Days 66–69	September 14, 2022	3.85	0.8
Monte explains to Brittany that he feel like Brittany was not acting like an ally to him, citing the information that leaked last week. The houseguests were woken up in the middle of the night for the Veto competition, having only two minutes to get to the backyard to avoid disqualification. Monte does not make it in time and therefore could not compete. In the competition, "Snooze Fest", the houseguests had to assemble 27 gears to turn and operate a cuckoo clock. Brittany complete her clock the fastest and won the Power of Veto. Brittany tries to get Monte to nominate Turner in her place, but Monte had different plans. At the Veto Ceremony, Brittany removes herself from the block. Monte names Taylor the replacement nominee, but wants Alyssa evicted.
851	31	"Episode 31"	Days 69–72	September 15, 2022	3.33	0.7
After nominations, Brittany feels excluded in the house and fears she is no longer Taylor's priority. Monte and Taylor express interest in one another. Feeling increasingly betrayed by Taylor, Brittany tries to flip the vote and keep Alyssa. Alyssa pitches to Turner, threatening her friendship if he is lying to her. At the eviction, Brittany and Turner both vote against their apparent allies, forcing a tie. Monte casts the tie breaking vote to evict Alyssa. Brittany, Taylor, and Turner compete for Head of Household in "Fashion Fest". Taylor wins Head of Household, guaranteeing her a spot on finale night.
Week 11
852	32	"Episode 32"	Days 72–73	September 18, 2022	4.47	0.9
After the HOH competition, Turner confronts Brittany about the vote, who has nothing to say to Turner. Taylor decides to nominate Brittany and Turner, stating that one of them voted against her. Both nominees tell Taylor they voted to save her, but Taylor is set on Turner as her target. The houseguest competed for the most powerful Veto of the summer in "Math Fest". The houseguest had to determine the day that various events occurred from photos and sum the days. Monte narrowly beat out Brittany, winning the final POV and securing a spot on finale night. With the sole vote to evict, Monte plans to keep Turner, but Taylor hopes to convince him otherwise.
853	33	"Episode 33"	Days 73–79	September 22, 2022	3.14	0.6
Week 12
854	34	"Episode 34"	Day 79; Various (Note: In Episode 34, the final three HouseGuests looked back over their time in the Big Brother house. Flashbacks included clips from previous days in the house, while the current day in the house was 79.)	September 23, 2022	2.39	0.4
Monte, Taylor, and Turner celebrated being the final three HouseGuests with a dinner provided by production and champagne. The three looked back over their time in the house highlighting what they believed to be the best moments.
855	35	"Episode 35"	Days 79–82	September 25, 2022	4.03	0.8
Monte, Taylor, and Turner compete in the final Head of Household competition. Turner outlasts the other two in Part 1, and Monte subsequently defeats Taylor in Part 2. In a live showdown for Part 3, Monte answers more questions correctly than Turner and is named the final HOH. Despite making an earlier final 2 deal with Turner, Monte votes to evict him, citing his need for a big move on his resume. Monte and Taylor then face the jury, where Monte highlights his challenge prowess and late game strategy while Taylor discusses her resiliency in surviving the block five times. The jury votes 8-1 to crown Taylor the winner of Big Brother 24, with Turner being the lone vote for Monte. Host Julie Chen later reveals that Taylor was also named America's Favorite Houseguest, bringing her total show winnings to $800,000.

== Voting history ==
Color key:

Winner
Runner-up
Head of Household
Nominated for eviction
Team Immunity
Not eligible to vote
Quit
Evicted

Voting history (season 24)
	Individual phase		Bestie phase (Note: From weeks 3 to 5, the HouseGuests played in sets known as "Festie Besties". Besties were nominated together and should the veto be used, the set would be removed from the block and be replaced by another set of Besties. On eviction night, the HouseGuest who survived eviction chose another set of Besties to join.)			Individual phase									
	Week 1	Week 2	Week 3	Week 4	Week 5	Week 6	Week 7 (Note: Following Indy's eviction, the HouseGuests were split into two groups of five that had no interaction for the entire week. One group, Big BroChella, lived inside the house for the week, while the other, Dyre Fest, lived outside in the backyard. A full week of events played out for each group, with their own competitions, nominations, and evictions.)		Week 8	Week 9		Week 10	Week 11	Week 12	
	Week 1	Week 2	Week 3	Week 4	Week 5	Week 6	Inside	Outside	Week 8	Day 59	Day 65 (Note: This week was a double eviction week. Following the first eviction, the remaining HouseGuests played a week's worth of games, including Head of Household and veto competitions, and nomination, veto and eviction ceremonies, during the live show, culminating in a second eviction for the week.)	Week 10	Week 11	Day 82	Finale
Head of Household	Daniel	Jasmine	Turner	Monte	Michael	Taylor	Michael	Terrance	Turner	Michael	Turner	Monte	Taylor	Monte	(None)
Nominations (initial)	Michael; Terrance	Pooch; Taylor	Brittany; Michael	Alyssa; Indy	Joseph; Monte; Terrance	Indy; Terrance	Jasmine; Monte	Joseph; Turner	Brittany; Taylor	Alyssa; Terrance	Alyssa; Brittany	Alyssa; Brittany	Brittany; Turner	(None)	(None)
Veto winner(s)	Michael	Michael	Brittany; Michael	Daniel; Kyle	Brittany; Michael	Kyle	Brittany	Terrance	Michael	Michael	Monte	Brittany	Monte	(None)	(None)
Nominations (final)	Taylor; Terrance	Pooch; Taylor	Ameerah; Terrance	Nicole; Taylor	Daniel; Kyle	Indy; Terrance	Jasmine; Monte	Joseph; Kyle	Kyle; Taylor	Alyssa; Terrance	Brittany; Michael	Alyssa; Taylor	Brittany; Turner	Taylor; Turner	(None)
Taylor	Nominated	Nominated	Ameerah	Nominated	Daniel	Head of Household	Jasmine	Not eligible	Nominated	Terrance	Michael	Nominated	Head of Household	Nominated	Winner
Monte	No vote	Pooch	Ameerah	Head of Household	Daniel	Indy	Nominated	Not eligible	Kyle	Terrance	Michael	Alyssa (Note: As the vote was tied, the Head of Household cast the tie-breaking vote.)	Brittany	Turner (Note: As Head of Household, Monte chose to evict Turner.)	Runner-up
Turner	No vote	Pooch	Head of Household	Nicole	Daniel	Indy	Not eligible	Joseph	Head of Household	Terrance	Head of Household	Alyssa	Nominated	Evicted (Day 82)	Monte
Brittany	Backstage (Note: Pooch selected three HouseGuests to be sent "backstage": Alyssa, Brittany, and Paloma. They could not be nominated for eviction, lost their eligibility to compete in the week's competitions, and were ineligible to vote on eviction night. Had the eviction gone ahead as planned, the HouseGuests would have voted for one of the nominees to face off against one of the backstage HouseGuests in a challenge, with the loser being evicted from the house. It was announced that Brittany had won the online public vote against Alyssa and Paloma, which would have granted her immunity from eviction.)	Pooch	Ameerah	Nicole	Daniel (Note: One of this HouseGuest's Besties won Head of Household, granting them immunity for the week.)	Indy	Jasmine	Not eligible	Kyle	Terrance	Nominated	Taylor	Nominated	Evicted (Day 79)	Taylor
Alyssa	Backstage	Pooch	Terrance	Nicole	Daniel	Indy	Not eligible	Joseph	Kyle	Nominated	Michael	Nominated	Evicted (Day 72)		Taylor
Michael	No vote	Pooch	Ameerah	Nicole	Head of Household	Terrance	Head of Household	Not eligible	Kyle	Head of Household	Nominated	Evicted (Day 65)			Taylor
Terrance	Nominated	Pooch	Nominated	Nicole	Kyle	Nominated	Not eligible	Head of Household	Kyle	Nominated	Evicted (Day 65)				Taylor
Kyle	No vote	Pooch	Ameerah	Nicole	Nominated	Indy	Not eligible	Nominated	Nominated	Evicted (Day 58)					Taylor
Joseph	No vote	Pooch	Ameerah	Nicole	Daniel	Indy	Not eligible	Nominated	Evicted (Day 51)						Taylor
Jasmine	No vote	Head of Household	Terrance	Nicole	Daniel	Indy	Nominated	Evicted (Day 51)							Taylor
Indy	No vote	Pooch	Terrance	Nicole	Daniel	Nominated	Evicted (Day 44)								Taylor
Daniel	Head of Household	Pooch	Ameerah	Taylor	Nominated	Evicted (Day 37)									
Nicole	No vote	Pooch	Terrance	Nominated	Evicted (Day 30)										
Ameerah	No vote	Pooch	Nominated	Evicted (Day 23)											
Pooch	Backstage; Boss (Note: For drawing the Backstage Boss ticket on day 1, Pooch was sent "backstage" and was granted immunity for the entire week. As a result, he could not be nominated for eviction, was ineligible to compete in the week's competitions, and would have been ineligible to vote on eviction night.)	Nominated	Evicted (Day 16)												
Paloma	Backstage	Walked (Day 8)													
Evicted	Eviction cancelled (Note: Paloma left the game on day 8. Since she was one of the HouseGuests eligible for eviction, the eviction planned for day 9 was cancelled.)	Pooch; 12 of 12 votes to evict	Ameerah; 7 of 11 votes to evict	Nicole; 9 of 10 votes to evict	Daniel; 8 of 9 votes to evict	Indy; 7 of 8 votes to evict	Jasmine; 2 of 2 votes to evict	Joseph; 2 of 2 votes to evict	Kyle; 5 of 5 votes to evict	Terrance; 4 of 4 votes to evict	Michael; 3 of 3 votes to evict	Alyssa; 2 of 3 votes to evict	Brittany; Monte's choice to evict	Turner; Monte's choice to evict	Taylor; 8 votes to win
Evicted	Eviction cancelled	Pooch; 12 of 12 votes to evict	Ameerah; 7 of 11 votes to evict	Nicole; 9 of 10 votes to evict	Daniel; 8 of 9 votes to evict	Indy; 7 of 8 votes to evict	Jasmine; 2 of 2 votes to evict	Joseph; 2 of 2 votes to evict	Kyle; 5 of 5 votes to evict	Terrance; 4 of 4 votes to evict	Michael; 3 of 3 votes to evict	Alyssa; 2 of 3 votes to evict	Brittany; Monte's choice to evict	Turner; Monte's choice to evict	Monte; 1 vote to win

== Production ==
=== Development ===
Big Brother 24 is co-produced by production companies Endemol Shine North America and Fly On The Wall Entertainment. The season was first confirmed following the conclusion of the previous season in a joint announcement that also confirmed that Celebrity Big Brother would be revived for a third season. Host Julie Chen Moonves returned for the season along with Allison Grodner and Rich Meehan who serve as executive producers. Casting for the season started in February 2022 and concluded sometime around June 2022. As had been the case since Big Brother 22, open-call auditions were not held for this season. Jesse Tannenbaum returned to head the casting efforts for Big Brother 24.

On June 1, 2022, CBS announced that the season would premiere on July 6, 2022, with confirmation on June 15, 2022, of a 90-minute live premiere. Prior to the season premiere, it was widely speculated that live audiences would return in a full capacity following two seasons of absence due to previous pandemic restrictions. While the premiere and first five evictions took place behind closed doors, a live audience returned for the remainder of the season, starting with the live eviction on August 18, 2022. Key art for the season was released on June 15, 2022.

=== Prize ===
The winner of the series, determined by the previously evicted HouseGuests, wins $750,000 while the runner-up receives $75,000. The HouseGuest selected as America's Favorite HouseGuest receives $50,000.

=== Production design ===
The mid-century styled living room.

The house is located at the Radford Studio Center in Los Angeles, California. As with previous seasons, the house is outfitted with 94 HD cameras and more than 113 microphones. Photos and a video tour of the house were released by CBS on July 5, 2022. Alternatively known as the "BB Motel", Julie Chen Mooves described the house's theme as a "colorful, desert oasis inspired by Palm Springs, and a blast from the past, mid-century style." A golf-themed bedroom has mini golf cart models lined along the walls, with the beds with headboards composed of AstroTurf. A second bedroom is decorated with details alluding to the car designs of the 1950s, including portraits of the car designs and beds with headboards composing of vintage car dashboards. The Space Age-themed bedroom features hanging models of Venus, Earth and Saturn. The Have-Not room resembles a drained pool, with a slide and inflatables being placed on the room.

== Reception ==
=== Critical responses ===
==== Mistreatment of Taylor Hale ====
Following the launch of the show's live feeds, a majority of the HouseGuests received criticism for their behavior towards Taylor Hale. Viewers noted multiple lies made about Hale, along with several comments that displayed racially charged microaggressions, acts of colorism, conscious bias, and unconscious assumptions regarding Hale's appearance and personality.

Julie Chen Moonves weighed in. "Microaggressions are real and they happen. I don't think most people, when they are committing it, that they are even aware of what they're doing. I think that with the live feeds it is easy," Chen said. "I think what we need to do is ask ourselves, 'Who am I — who is anyone — to judge somebody else?'". She also addressed those that were critical of the HouseGuests on social media: "It's so interesting that you use the term 'mob mentality.' Because isn't that what Twitter has done? Aren't you all being hypocrites? There has been this mob mentality created against people in the house, who viewers feel have not been kind to Taylor. I think anytime you're nominated, it'll bring you to tears... It hurts. It hurts and I have sympathy for her. I have sympathy for everyone in that house. It's not easy".

Daniel Durston's outburst and disparaging comments towards Taylor Hale were heavily criticized by the viewer audience. Featured on episode 9, Durston verbally attacked Hale in defense of Nicole Layog, who misinterpreted Hale's support of her emotional breakdown as a hint to quit the game. After Layog vented about the situation to the other HouseGuests, Durston confronted a confused Hale and accused her of causing HouseGuest Paloma Aguilar's exit from the show. Blaming Hale for Aguilar's mental health, Durston tells Hale, "You can f*** right off" and not to talk to him until the show's live finale. The confrontation brought Hale to tears with no one to publicly defend her. Prior to his outburst, Durston was also criticized for claiming, according to the live feeds, that Taylor is not a good person and she "doesn't deserve to live normal." After his eviction during Week 5, Durston addressed his treatment of Hale in an interview with Entertainment Weekly. "Leaving the house, obviously it sits terrible with me. That's not how I want to be portrayed," Durston said. He also claimed that he would watch the show back to "correct [his] wrongs."

==== Kyle Capener's racial optics ====
Viewers criticized Kyle Capener for attempting to create a racial divide among the contestants. During Week 4's live footage, Capener expressed fear in a potential alliance developing between the minorities in the house, labeling them as "Cookout 2.0.", referring to Big Brother 23's all-black six-person alliance.

Julie Chen Moonves addressed Capener's comments, deeming them as "game paranoia". She states, "You also have to remember, [Hale] told her whole alliance she would not nominate [Davis] because she refuses to part of evicting another Black woman. That might have steered [Capener]'s mind into thinking what if there is a secret alliance like the Cookout this season. Beyond that, I don't think there's much more to it."

=== Viewing figures ===
Viewership and ratings per episode of Big Brother 24
No.	Title	Air date	Timeslot (ET)	Rating (18–49)	Viewers (millions)	DVR (18–49)	DVR viewers (millions)	Total (18–49)	Total viewers (millions)	Ref.
1	"Episode 1"	July 6, 2022	Wednesday 8:00 p.m.	0.8	3.84	0.4	1.25	1.2	5.09	
2	"Episode 2"	July 10, 2022	Sunday 8:00 p.m.	0.7	3.41	0.5	1.27	1.1	4.68	
3	"Episode 3"	July 13, 2022	Wednesday 8:00 p.m.	0.7	3.46	0.5	1.23	1.1	4.69	
4	"Episode 4"	July 14, 2022	Thursday 9:00 p.m.	0.7	3.21	0.5	1.24	1.1	4.45	
5	"Episode 5"	July 17, 2022	Sunday 8:00 p.m.	0.6	3.34	0.3	1.03	0.9	4.37	
6	"Episode 6"	July 20, 2022	Wednesday 8:00 p.m.	0.7	3.54	0.3	1.08	1.0	4.62	
7–8	"Episode 7" "Episode 8"	July 24, 2022	Sunday 8:00 p.m.	0.7	3.36	0.3	1.54	1.0	4.49	
9	"Episode 9"	July 27, 2022	Wednesday 8:00 p.m.	0.8	3.77	0.3	1.11	1.1	4.88	
10	"Episode 10"	July 28, 2022	Thursday 9:00 p.m.	0.8	3.56	0.4	1.20	1.2	4.76	
11	"Episode 11"	July 31, 2022	Sunday 8:00 p.m.	0.8	4.07	0.3	0.84	1.1	4.91	
12	"Episode 12"	August 3, 2022	Wednesday 8:00 p.m.	0.8	3.83	TBD	TBD	TBD	TBD	
13	"Episode 13"	August 4, 2022	Thursday 9:00 p.m.	0.7	3.60	TBD	TBD	TBD	TBD	
14	"Episode 14"	August 7, 2022	Sunday 8:00 p.m.	0.8	3.96	TBD	TBD	TBD	TBD	
15	"Episode 15"	August 10, 2022	Wednesday 8:00 p.m.	0.8	3.86	0.3	1.01	1.1	4.87	
16	"Episode 16"	August 11, 2022	Thursday 9:00 p.m.	0.8	3.63	0.3	0.98	1.1	4.63	
17	"Episode 17"	August 14, 2022	Sunday 8:00 p.m.	0.8	3.95	0.3	1.00	1.1	4.96	
18	"Episode 18"	August 17, 2022	Wednesday 8:00 p.m.	0.9	4.06	0.3	0.97	1.2	5.02	
19	"Episode 19"	August 18, 2022	Thursday 9:00 p.m.	0.7	3.41	0.4	1.24	1.1	4.66	
20	"Episode 20"	August 21, 2022	Sunday 8:00 p.m.	0.8	3.95	0.3	0.97	1.1	4.92	
21	"Episode 21"	August 24, 2022	Wednesday 8:00 p.m.	0.9	3.99	TBD	TBD	TBD	TBD	
22	"Episode 22"	August 25, 2022	Thursday 9:00 p.m.	0.8	3.52	TBD	TBD	TBD	TBD	
23	"Episode 23"	August 28, 2022	Sunday 8:40 p.m.	0.8	4.01	TBD	TBD	TBD	TBD	
24	"Episode 24"	August 31, 2022	Wednesday 8:00 p.m.	0.8	3.80	TBD	TBD	TBD	TBD	
25	"Episode 25"	September 1, 2022	Thursday 9:00 p.m.	0.8	3.68	TBD	TBD	TBD	TBD	
26	"Episode 26"	September 4, 2022	Sunday 8:00 p.m.	0.5	3.27	TBD	TBD	TBD	TBD	
27	"Episode 27"	September 7, 2022	Wednesday 8:00 p.m.	0.8	3.83	TBD	TBD	TBD	TBD	
28	"Episode 28"	September 8, 2022	Thursday 9:00 p.m.	0.7	3.17	TBD	TBD	TBD	TBD	
29	"Episode 29"	September 11, 2022	Sunday 8:30 p.m.	0.8	4.05	TBD	TBD	TBD	TBD	
30	"Episode 30"	September 14, 2022	Wednesday 8:00 p.m.	0.8	3.85	TBD	TBD	TBD	TBD	
31	"Episode 31"	September 15, 2022	Thursday 9:00 p.m.	0.7	3.33	TBD	TBD	TBD	TBD	
32	"Episode 32"	September 18, 2022	Sunday 9:01 p.m.	0.9	4.47	TBD	TBD	TBD	TBD	
33	"Episode 33"	September 22, 2022	Thursday 9:00 p.m.	0.6	3.14	TBD	TBD	TBD	TBD	
34	"Episode 34"	September 23, 2022	Friday 8:00 p.m.	0.4	2.39	TBD	TBD	TBD	TBD	
35	"Episode 35"	September 25, 2022	Sunday 8:00 p.m.	0.8	4.03	TBD	TBD	TBD	TBD	
