= Big Brother 23 (American season) =

American television reality program

Big Brother
- Season 23
- Promotional poster for Big Brother 23
- Hosted by: Julie Chen Moonves
- No. of days: 85
- No. of houseguests: 16
- Winner: Xavier Prather
- Runner-up: Derek Frazier
- America's Favorite HouseGuest: Tiffany Mitchell
- No. of episodes: 37

Release
- Original network: CBS
- Original release: July 7 – September 29, 2021

Season chronology
- ← Previous; Season 22 Next → Season 24

Big Brother 23 is the twenty-third season of the American reality television program Big Brother. The season featured a casino theme. It premiered on July 7, 2021, on CBS in the United States and Global in Canada. Hosted by Julie Chen Moonves, the show follows a group of contestants (known as HouseGuests), who live in a house together while being constantly filmed and having no communication with the outside world as they compete to win a grand prize of $750,000.

The season concluded on September 29, 2021, after 85 days of competition. Xavier Prather was crowned the winner after defeating Derek Frazier in an 9–0 jury vote, becoming the first black HouseGuest to win in the main edition of the show. Prather became the third winner in mainline Big Brother history to win by a unanimous jury vote (following Dan Gheesling of Big Brother 10 and Cody Calafiore of Big Brother 22). Tiffany Mitchell was voted as the season's America's Favorite HouseGuest by the public, winning the $50,000 prize that comes with the award.

== Format ==
Big Brother depicts a group of contestants, known as HouseGuests, who live inside a custom-built house outfitted with cameras and microphones recording their every move 24 hours a day. The HouseGuests are sequestered in the Big Brother House with no contact with the outside world. During their stay, the HouseGuests share their thoughts on events and other HouseGuests inside the Diary Room. Each week, the HouseGuests compete in competitions in order to win power and safety inside the house. At the start of each week, the HouseGuests compete in the Head of Household (abbreviated "HOH") competition. The winner of the HoH competition is immune from eviction and must select two HouseGuests to be nominated for eviction. Six HouseGuests are then selected to compete in the Power of Veto (abbreviated "PoV") competition: the reigning HoH, the nominees, and three other HouseGuests selected by random draw. The winner of the PoV competition wins the right to either revoke the nomination of one of the nominated HouseGuests or leave them as is. If the veto winner uses this power, the HoH must immediately nominate another HouseGuest for eviction. The PoV winner is also immune from being named as the replacement nominee. On eviction night, all HouseGuests must vote to evict one of the nominees. The Head of Household and the nominees are not allowed to vote. This compulsory vote is conducted in the privacy of the Diary Room. In the event of a tie, the Head of Household casts the tie-breaking vote. The nominee with the most votes is evicted from the house. The last nine evicted HouseGuests comprise the Jury and are sequestered in a separate house following their eviction, and ultimately decide the winner of the season. The Jury is not allowed to watch the show except for competitions and ceremonies that include all of the remaining HouseGuests. They are not shown any Diary Room interviews or any footage that might include strategy or details regarding nominations. The viewing public is able to award an additional prize of $50,000 to their favorite HouseGuest of the season. All evicted HouseGuests are eligible to win this award except for those who either voluntarily leave or are forcibly removed for rule-breaking.

=== Format changes and additions ===
Through various interviews, the show's producers, Allison Grodner and Rich Meehan, debuted the twists for the season.

==== Teams ====
HouseGuests were separated into four teams of four during the live premiere, with two males and two females on each team. Four competitions took place throughout the premiere to decide four team captains; the captains then received a brief introduction from two randomly selected HouseGuests with the option to select either of them for their team. As with Big Brother 11 and Big Brother 18, Heads of Household earned immunity for their entire team. The team phase of the game concluded after the fourth eviction.

Team	Captain	Members
Jokers	Frenchie	Azah; Britini; Derek F.
Aces	Whitney	Brent; Derek X. Hannah
Kings	Christian	Alyssa; Sarah Beth; Xavier
Queens	Claire	Kyland; Tiffany; Travis

==== Wildcard Competition ====
For the first four weeks, the three teams without immunity each selected a teammate to compete in the Wildcard Competition. The winning HouseGuest was given the chance to gain immunity but was given a Wildcard decision in exchange for that immunity; this decision could affect the game for either the Wildcard winner, their teammates, or all HouseGuests. Each HouseGuest could only compete in a Wildcard competition once, unless all other team members had already played. The winner for each week's competition is in bold.

Week	Wildcard competitors				Wildcard decision		
Week	Jokers	Aces	Kings	Queens	Offer	Consequence	Result
1	(None)	Hannah	**Christian**	Kyland	Immunity for teammates	Christian spun a wheel containing the numbers 1, 2, and 3, which corresponded to the number of teammates he could keep safe for the week in addition to himself.	The wheel landed on 1. Christian granted immunity for the week to Xavier.
2	Frenchie	Brent	**Sarah Beth**	(None)	Immunity to swap	Sarah Beth could choose to either swap teams with a member of the Queens, thereby giving herself immunity and taking immunity from the swapped teammate, or decline immunity altogether.	Sarah Beth chose to stay on her team.
3	Britini	Derek X.	(None)	**Tiffany**	Immunity for rivals	Tiffany had the option to accept safety; however, the Jokers and the Aces would have had a chance for one of their teammates to win immunity through a game of chance.	Tiffany declined the offer, thereby preventing a member of the Jokers or Aces from gaining immunity.
4	Azah	Whitney	(None)	**Claire**	Immunity for the team or immunity until jury	Claire could choose between safety for herself and the rest of her team for the week, or safety for herself until the jury phase of the game.	Claire chose safety for herself until the jury phase of the game.

==== High Roller's Room ====
For weeks six through eight, the High Roller's Room opened for the final eleven HouseGuests, and an in-game currency, “BB Bucks” (BB$), was introduced. America distributed a certain amount of BB$ to each HouseGuest through text voting; the three HouseGuests with the most votes received BB$100, the next three received BB$75, and the remaining HouseGuests received BB$50. For week eight, additional BB$ were distributed via a random envelope draw after the HoH competition. HouseGuests were not required to use their BB$ immediately and could hold them for as long as possible.

While the room was open, HouseGuests could use their BB$ to play a game of chance. If they won the game, they would win a power. The stronger the power, the more expensive the game. Powers won are only allowed to be used within the week that it was obtained.

Week	BB$ Distribution			High Roller's Room			
Week	BB$100	BB$75	BB$50	Game	Players	Winner	Result
6	Britini; Derek F. Derek X.	Hannah; Tiffany; Xavier	Alyssa; Azah; Claire; Kyland; Sarah Beth	**Veto Derby (BB$50)**; HouseGuests had to slide three drinks down a table to earn points. If a drink fell off the table, they received no points for that drink. The six highest point earners were given the chance to bet on who would win the Power of Veto for a second veto for the week.	Claire; Derek F. Kyland; Sarah Beth; Tiffany	**Kyland**	Kyland placed his bet on Alyssa to win the Power of Veto. Alyssa won, giving Kyland a second Power of Veto for the week.
7	Claire; Derek F. Derek X.	Alyssa; Hannah; Xavier	Azah; Kyland; Sarah Beth; Tiffany	**Chopping Block Roulette (BB$125)**; Houseguests had to stand on a wobbly table and roll a ball in a circle as many times as they could in two minutes. The HouseGuest with the most points had to remove someone from the block and spin a roulette wheel to determine the replacement nominee.	Alyssa	**Alyssa**	Alyssa won the competition and removed Derek F. from the block. She spun the roulette wheel and Xavier became the replacement nominee. Alyssa and Derek F. also received immunity for the week.
8	Claire; Hannah; Tiffany	Alyssa; Derek F. Xavier	Azah; Kyland; Sarah Beth	**Coin of Destiny (BB$250)**; Participating HouseGuests had to roll coins into one of three slots in two minutes. The winner with the most points then called a coin toss, and if guessed correctly, was able to overthrow the incumbent HoH.	Claire; Derek F.	**Claire**	Claire won the competition and replaced Tiffany as the HOH. Claire chose to keep Kyland and Sarah Beth on the block.

==== Back-to-Back Double Evictions ====
This season was the first to feature back-to-back Double Eviction nights over two consecutive weeks instead of Double Evictions spread out by a few weeks, an early eviction night, or a Triple Eviction as done in previous seasons. As a result, Claire, Alyssa, Tiffany and Hannah were all evicted in the span of only two weeks.

== HouseGuests ==
The cast of the twenty-third season of Big Brother Top: Derek F., Britini, Travis, Derek X., Frenchie, Xavier, Claire, Kyland, Christian, and Azah Bottom: Whitney, Sarah Beth, Brent, Alyssa, Hannah and Tiffany

As a response to racial reckoning in the United States and a lack of diverse representation on television, CBS enacted a policy whereby at least 50% of the cast of its reality shows must be BIPOC starting beginning with the 2021–22 broadcast season. The HouseGuests for the twenty-third season were announced on July 1, 2021. Among the 16 HouseGuests is professional boxer Joe Frazier's son Derek Frazier. Christie Valdiserri, a 27-year-old from North Hollywood, California, was originally part of the cast, but tested positive for COVID-19 while in sequester and could not compete. She was replaced by Claire Rehfuss.

Name	Age	Occupation	Residence	Result
Xavier Prather	27	Attorney	Milwaukee, Wisconsin	Winner; Day 85
Derek Frazier	29	Safety officer	Philadelphia, Pennsylvania	Runner-up; Day 85
Azah Awasum	30	Sales operations director	Takoma Park, Maryland	Evicted; Day 85
Kyland Young	29	Account executive	Venice Beach, California	Evicted; Day 79
Hannah Chaddha	21	Grad student	Chicago, Illinois	Evicted; Day 71
Tiffany Mitchell	40	Phlebotomist	Detroit, Michigan	Evicted; Day 71
Alyssa Lopez	24	Swimwear designer	Sarasota, Florida	Evicted; Day 65
Claire Rehfuss	25	AI technical architect	New York City, New York	Evicted; Day 65
Sarah Beth Steagall	27	Forensic scientist	Fort Myers, Florida	Evicted; Day 58
Derek Xiao	24	Start-up founder	New York City, New York	Evicted; Day 51
Britini D'Angelo	24	Kindergarten teacher	Niagara Falls, New York	Evicted; Day 44
Christian Birkenberger	23	General contractor assistant	Harwinton, Connecticut	Evicted; Day 37
Whitney Williams	30	Make-up artist	Happy Valley, Oregon	Evicted; Day 30
Brent Champagne	28	Flight attendant	Cranston, Rhode Island	Evicted; Day 23
Brandon "Frenchie" French	34	Farmer	Clarksville, Tennessee	Evicted; Day 16
Travis Long	22	Technology sales consultant	Honolulu, Hawaii	Evicted; Day 9

=== Future appearances ===
In 2022, Tiffany Mitchell appeared on Big Brother 24 to host a Power of Veto competition. Later that season, Mitchell and the remaining members of The Cookout alliance, Xavier Prather, Derek Frazier, Azah Awasum, Kyland Young, and Hannah Chaddha, returned for a segment during the final 4 eviction episode. Later that year, Awasum, Young, Mitchell, Prather, Alyssa Lopez and Derek Xiao competed on the first season of The Challenge: USA. Xiao and Claire Rehfuss competed as a team on The Amazing Race 34.

In 2023, Lopez and Mitchell competed on the second season of The Challenge: USA. Later that year, Young competed on The Challenge: Battle for a New Champion. Xavier Prather returned to compete on Big Brother: Reindeer Games, while Xiao and Mitchell returned to host.

In 2024, Prather competed on the USA Network reality competition show The Anonymous. Young returned to competed on The Challenge 40: Battle of the Eras.

In 2025, Chaddha and Young competed on The Amazing Race 38. Chaddha was partnered with her sister, while Young was partnered with his girlfriend and Big Brother 24 winner Taylor Hale.

In 2026, Mitchell competed on the fourth season of The Traitors. Later, Prather competed on the sixth season of The Floor. Awasum, Chaddah, Frazier, Mitchell, Prather and Young all came back to talk to Julie on the 1000th episode of Big Brother on the twenty-eighth season. Mitchell also came back to help host the week 9 twist.

== Episodes ==
No. overall	No. in season	Title	Day(s)	Original release date	U.S. viewers (millions)	Rating (18–49)
Week 1
784	1	"Episode 1"	Day 1	July 7, 2021	4.25	1.1
Sixteen HouseGuests entered the house. In four groups, the HouseGuests participated in "kick-off" competitions, wherein competitors had to arrange a plexiglass display to match the example. Once believing their display was exact, they hit their buzzer to ring in. If correct, they won, and would become a 'team captain', eligible to become Head of Household (HoH). Frenchie, Whitney, Christian, and Claire won their respective competitions. Captains chose teammates based on short introductions. After teams were picked, HouseGuests competed in the "House of Cards" HoH competition. Each captain had to build a pyramid of cards on a platform balanced by their teammates. The first captain to build their pyramid and hit their buzzer became HoH, giving their teammates immunity; the last team to finish became Have-Nots. Frenchie won HoH, while Christian's team became Have-Nots. Frenchie was offered to participate in a challenge wherein he had to throw two dice onto a platform in 45 seconds. If he completed the challenge, his team would be safe for two weeks, but if he lost, he was no longer HoH, his team no longer had immunity, and Claire, as runner-up would become HoH. Frenchie rejected the offer.
785	2	"Episode 2"	Days 1–3	July 11, 2021	3.76	0.9
Frenchie began strategizing, saying that he would not nominate anyone from his entry group or any female HouseGuest. He set his target on "meatheads" (Christian, Brent, Travis). On Day 2, the Wildcard competition was introduced. Each non-winning team from the HoH competition had to elect one teammate to participate, with the winner receiving immunity and an additional game-changing dilemma. The elected HouseGuests were Christian, Hannah and Kyland. In the competition, "Do Not Disturb", the three had to search a room for a set of keys, wallet and a cellphone, while making as little noise as possible. The louder the noise produced, the more points would be added to their combined totals. The HouseGuests were given five minutes to compete, with fifty penalty points being added every ten seconds thereafter. Christian won with 125 points. Christian had to spin a wheel containing numbers 1 through 3, corresponding to the number of teammates he could give immunity to. The wheel landed on 1; he granted immunity to Xavier. Frenchie decided to target Alyssa, Christian's teammate, perceiving their close relationship as a "showmance". On Day 3, Frenchie nominated Alyssa and Kyland for eviction.
786	3	"Episode 3"	Days 3–6	July 14, 2021	3.63	0.8
The HouseGuests were confused following the nominations ceremony, and Alyssa and Christian approached Frenchie in order to gain insight into his decision. After they were able to convince Frenchie that they were just friends, Frenchie realized his mistake and instead planned to backdoor Derek X. after noticing his close relationship with Travis. Brent, Derek's teammate, warned him that he might be at risk, while also attempting to convince Frenchie to target Travis instead. Meanwhile, Azah, Derek F, Kyland, Tiffany and Xavier formed "The Cookout" alliance. On Day 4, Tiffany, Travis (Kyland's choice) and Derek X. were chosen to compete alongside Frenchie, Alyssa and Kyland in the "Massive Cocktails" Power of Veto (PoV) competition. For this competition, HouseGuests were required to arrange large pieces of fruit on a downhill ramp in order to guide their ball into the glass box at the end. Derek X. was the first HouseGuest to successfully aim his ball through the pieces of fruit and into the glass box, therefore winning the PoV. At the PoV ceremony on Day 6, Derek X. removed Kyland from the block at Frenchie's request; Frenchie nominated Travis, going back on the deal he made on Day 1.
787	4	"Episode 4"	Days 6–9	July 15, 2021	3.81	0.9
Following the PoV ceremony, Frenchie formed multiple alliances, including an eight-person alliance called the "Slaughterhouse", as well as an all-girl alliance called the "French Kisses" with Azah, Claire, Hannah and Tiffany, though they doubted his intentions. The HouseGuests then celebrated Kyland's thirtieth birthday, which included a birthday cake and a striptease from Travis posing as "Travisa". Prior to the eviction, Travis met with Frenchie and Brent to make a last-ditch effort to save himself, though his efforts proved futile as, on Day 9, Travis was the first HouseGuest to be evicted from the Big Brother house by a vote of 11–2; Big D and Tiffany both cast a rogue vote against Alyssa. The remaining HouseGuests then competed in the next HoH competition, "Pool Sharks". Each HouseGuest had to stand at a spot numbered from 1 to 30, with 1 being the easiest spot and 30 being the hardest spot, and attempt to hit a ball into a shark's mouth. Before the competition began, each HouseGuest was required to enter a number into their keypad to claim a spot from 1 to 30. The HouseGuest with the highest number that scored successfully was the winner; Kyland became the second HoH.
Week 2
788	5	"Episode 5"	Days 9–10	July 18, 2021	3.49	0.8
Following Kyland's win, the HouseGuests attempted to figure out the identities of the rogue voters; Tiffany's vote for Alyssa was part of a deal she made with Frenchie so that she could know whether or not to trust him, while Frenchie wanted to frame Derek X. On Day 10, Brent, Frenchie and Sarah Beth were selected to participate in the "BB Flying Colors" Wildcard competition. For this competition, the three competitors were presented with several colorful images, and afterwards were asked a question based on the images, with the answer being a color. The first HouseGuest to reach three points won the competition. Sarah Beth won. After the competition, Sarah Beth was offered immunity as long as she switched teams with one of Kyland's immune teammates, Claire or Tiffany. If she took the offer, the HouseGuest she chose to swap with would no longer be immune. She chose not to take the offer, feeling comfortable in her relationship with Kyland. Prior to the nominations ceremony, several HouseGuests with the exception of Britini expressed a desire for Frenchie to be nominated. Thus, later that evening, Kyland nominated Britini and Frenchie for eviction.
789	6	"Episode 6"	Days 10–13	July 21, 2021	3.50	0.8
With two of their teammates on the block, the Jokers (Azah, Britini, Big D and Frenchie) were distraught. Upon learning that the Slaughterhouse had thrown Frenchie under the bus, he spilled details of the alliance to his fellow HouseGuests, telling many of them that Alyssa, Brent, Christian, Kyland and Whitney were all aligned. As a result, a consensus was reached by the majority of the house that, in order to protect their alliances, Frenchie could not win the veto. On Day 11, Alyssa, Claire and Derek X. were randomly selected to participate alongside Kyland, Britini and Frenchie in the "Fun Tan Lotion" PoV competition. The HouseGuests competed separately and were required to fill their containers with suntan oil in order to retrieve a whistle from the container in the fastest time. Derek X. completed the competition in the fastest time (4:41) and therefore won the veto. Although the Jokers attempted to put a plan together in order to ensure that their team would remain intact, Derek X. and Kyland could not trust Frenchie's promises, and Kyland did not want to get unnecessary blood on his hands. On Day 13, Derek X. chose not to use the veto, solidifying Britini and Frenchie as the final nominees.
790	7	"Episode 7"	Days 13–16	July 22, 2021	3.87	0.9
With nominations locked in, Frenchie campaigned heavily to stay in the game, while Britini opted to keep a low profile to keep the target solely on Frenchie. Meanwhile, Kyland pulled the Aces (Brent, Derek X., Hannah and Whitney) aside to ask them for safety in return for him keeping them safe this week; though Derek X. was willing to make a promise, Brent and Whitney were hesitant to respond. Eventually, the HouseGuests became wary of Brent and Whitney's position within the game, and the Kings and Queens discussed targeting them the following week provided no teammate from Aces win HoH. On Day 16, Frenchie was evicted by a vote of 11–1, with only Big D voting for him to stay. Following this, HouseGuests competed in the "Tom Talks BB" HoH competition. For this competition, the HouseGuests watched two videos from comedian and second season Celebrity Big Brother HouseGuest Tom Green interviewing members of the public about Big Brother. Afterwards, they were asked true or false questions based on what they saw; if a HouseGuest answered incorrectly, they were eliminated. Xavier was the last HouseGuest standing and became the third HoH of the season.
Week 3
791	8	"Episode 8"	Days 16–17	July 25, 2021	3.31	0.8
Xavier and Tiffany discussed nominating Brent, perceiving him to be a socially strong player. Hannah in particular wanted to target Brent, having thrown the HoH competition along with Derek X. so that he could not receive immunity for the week. A new alliance, "The Royal Flush", formed between the Kings, the Queens and Derek X., with the intentions of voting Brent out this week. On Day 17, Britini, Derek X. and Tiffany competed in the "Unlucky 13" Wildcard competition. They had to take cards one at a time across a balance beam and place them into one of four slots belonging to another competitor. If a competitor's cards totaled thirteen, they were eliminated. After eliminating Britini first, Derek X. threw the competition, and Tiffany was the winner. To receive immunity, she had to participate in a game of chance which would also allocate safety to one member of both the Jokers and the Aces; she declined the offer. Wanting to make Brent feel safe, Xavier told him that he was going up as a pawn, and that Britini was the target, but Azah was unhappy with the plan and opted to take Britini's place on the block. However, not wanting to use his own ally as a pawn, Xavier nominated Brent and Britini for eviction.
792	9	"Episode 9"	Days 17–20	July 28, 2021	3.79	1.0
Brent did not believe that he was the pawn, but nevertheless felt as though he had the numbers to stay over Britini. Tiffany and Derek X sabotaging Britini in the Wildcard competition led to a disagreement between Tiffany and Azah, with the two agreeing to disagree, while Hannah was introduced as the unofficial sixth member of The Cookout alliance. On Day 18, Christian (Xavier's choice), Derek F. and Whitney were selected to participate alongside Xavier, Brent and Britini in the "Room Key Rumble" PoV competition. In six one-on-one rounds, the HouseGuests each chose which other HouseGuest they wanted to compete against. They had to spin on a handle to bring down a barrier covering six numbered pins. They then had to knock down three of the pins so that the remaining three corresponded to a specific room number. Christian won the final round against Xavier and was therefore the winner. Brent believed that he was the HouseGuest orchestrating the blindside, suggesting to Christian to not use the veto and send Britini home in what he perceived would be a close vote. On Day 20, Christian chose not to use the veto, but only to solidify the plan to blindside Brent.
793	10	"Episode 10"	Days 20–23	July 29, 2021	3.86	0.9
Brent believed that Xavier and Christian made a mistake not using the Veto as he thought he had the votes from an alliance between the Aces and the Queens called "The Mafia". However, the Queens only created the alliance to ensure their safety had Brent won HoH, and they along with the rest of the house planned on blindsiding him at the live eviction. The HouseGuests debated who should win the HoH competition based on who they wanted to target for the upcoming week; several HouseGuests believed Alyssa and Christian to be the most threatening duo at this point in the game. On Day 23, via a unanimous vote of 11–0 Brent was the third houseguest to be evicted. The HouseGuests then competed in the HoH competition called "Pier Pressure". Each team had to assemble a surfboard puzzle one HouseGuest at a time without letting their time clock expire, or else the team would be eliminated. The HouseGuest on the winning team that installed the final piece and buzzed in would be crowned HoH. Since the Kings completed their puzzle first and Christian finished the puzzle and hit the buzzer, he became the fourth HoH of the season.
Week 4
794	11	"Episode 11"	Days 23–24	August 1, 2021	3.40	0.9
Members of the Jokers and the Aces were concerned about their safety following Christian's HoH win. The Kings weighed the pros and cons of Hannah and Whitney as nominees for the week, with Christian planning to nominate two Jokers alongside one another should Whitney win the Wildcard competition. The HouseGuests made fun of Whitney's fashion choices, and Derek X. and Azah talked about the importance of cultural representation. Claire, Whitney, and Azah competed in the fourth and final Wildcard competition of the season, "Olive Shook Up", where they had to roll olives down a martini glass-shaped ramp and land them in a straw. Claire won and was faced with her Wildcard decision: receive safety for both herself and her teammates for one week, or receive safety for only herself until Jury; Claire chose the latter. Sarah Beth was frustrated that the Royal Flush alliance was not recognizing Hannah as a threat, while members of The Cookout alliance tried to push for Whitney to be the target to keep Hannah safe; Derek F. told Christian that Whitney mentioned targeting the Kings. Though a target had not been decided yet, on Day 24, Christian decided to nominate Whitney and Hannah for eviction.
795	12	"Episode 12"	Days 24–27	August 4, 2021	3.64	0.9
The Kings discussed which of the two nominees should be targeted this week; Sarah Beth continued to push for Hannah, while Xavier pushed for Whitney, causing Sarah Beth to grow suspicious of his intentions. Christian ultimately decided to target Whitney, believing that she would be more likely than Hannah to target him in return, unaware that he was in fact Hannah's prime target. Whitney denied to Christian that she planned to target the Kings had she won HoH, but Christian knew that she was lying. Derek X. was torn between his loyalties to the Royal Flush alliance and wanting to keep his team intact, and Tiffany informed Hannah that Sarah Beth expressed that she wanted to target her. On Day 25, Claire, Derek X. (Hannah's choice) and Azah were selected to compete alongside Christian, Hannah and Whitney in the PoV competition, "Bump, Set, Veto". For this competition, the HouseGuests were required to roll a volleyball along a curved ramp and catch it on the other side 100 times; if a HouseGuest dropped the ball, their score would reset. Christian was the winner. On Day 27, Christian decided not to use the veto, therefore keeping Hannah and Whitney on the block.
796	13	"Episode 13"	Days 27–30	August 5, 2021	3.73	0.9
Tiffany laid out her plan to the rest of The Cookout alliance to help get them to the final six. Each member needed to align with a non-Cookout member as a pawn so they appear as duos to the rest of the house, but The Cookout always has the numbers to save each other from the block while avoiding suspicion. Trust issues began to cause tension between Cookout members, and Whitney campaigned to the House to try to get Hannah sent home. On Day 30, with votes 10–0, Whitney became the fourth houseguest to be evicted from the Big Brother House. Following the live eviction, the Team Twist and Wildcard competitions officially came to an end, and the HouseGuests began the "Whale of a Time" wall endurance competition.
Week 5
797	14	"Episode 14"	Days 30–31	August 8, 2021	3.97	1.1
After promising safety to Alyssa and Xavier during the wall competition, Derek X. was the last HouseGuest remaining and was crowned the new HoH. Following the competition, Xavier tried to get Derek X. to keep the entire former Kings team safe, which was not included in the original agreement. Tiffany accidentally mentioned The Royal Flush in front of Hannah, revealing an eight-person alliance that Hannah was not a part of. Derek X. evaluated options for pawns in order to set up his plan to backdoor Christian later in the week. On Day 31, Derek X. nominated Britini and Sarah Beth for eviction.
798	15	"Episode 15"	Days 31–34	August 11, 2021	3.96	0.9
Following the nomination ceremony, Derek X. discussed with Sarah Beth his intentions to backdoor Christian, whilst telling The Royal Flush alliance his target was Britini. In the "Kingdom of Curl-a-Lot" veto competition, Sarah Beth loses the second round by one rep to Britini and was criticised for keeping the $5,000 prize instead of swapping it for the veto. After Britini won the PoV competition, Derek X. informed Alyssa and Xavier that he was thinking of putting up Christian as a replacement, whilst they tried to get him rethink his decision.
799	16	"Episode 16"	Days 34–37	August 12, 2021	3.85	0.9
At the veto meeting, Britini used the Power of Veto on herself and Derek X. named Christian as the replacement nominee. Christian attempted to switch Derek X.'s target to Sarah Beth due to her taking the money over the veto. Derek X., Claire and Kyland's veto punishments began, meanwhile Tiffany and Xavier attempted to flip the vote, with Tiffany having discussions with Claire and informed Christian that the Jokers were not being honest about their voting intentions. Tiffany tried to have a private conversation with Britini to convince her to flip, but Azah and Derek F. became frustrated at Tiffany's attempt to manipulate Britini, causing a stir between The Cookout alliance. On Day 37, by a vote of 7–2, Christian became the fifth houseguest to be evicted from the Big Brother House.
Week 6
800	17	"Episode 17"	Days 37–38	August 15, 2021	3.78	1.0
The HouseGuests competed in an elimination-style HoH competition called "Name That Croon" where they had to identify if former competitions were HoH, PoV, or Wildcard. In the final round, Kyland tried to throw the competition to Tiffany, but when she answered incorrectly, Kyland was crowned the new HoH. Derek F. secretly volunteered as a pawn to protect The Cookout alliance, and as a result, Kyland nominated Derek F. and Claire for eviction. The High Roller's Room was opened and the HouseGuests learned about the three games where they could earn powers for the next three weeks based on how many BB Bucks America voted to give them. In Veto Derby (worth 50 BB Bucks), the HouseGuest could win a second veto if they correctly bet on the winner of the PoV competition. In Chopping Block Roulette (125 BB Bucks), the winning HouseGuest could remove a nominee from the block and spin a roulette wheel to reassign the nominee at random. In Coin of Destiny (250 BB Bucks), a HouseGuest could anonymously overthrow the current HoH by correct calling a coin toss. Since they competed in the Veto Derby, Kyland, Derek F., Claire, and Sarah Beth will bet on the outcome of the upcoming PoV competition.
801	18	"Episode 18"	Days 38–41	August 18, 2021	3.80	0.9
Britini and Kyland discussed a deal to keep each other safe, while Kyland planned out his targets for the week. Britini, Alyssa, and Azah were picked to play alongside Kyland, Derek F. and Claire in the upcoming Veto competition. The winners of Veto Derby placed their bets on who would win for the chance to earn a second PoV. The HouseGuests competed in "OTEV the Jacked Jellyfish" where they had to search the yard for a jelly plaque showing the names of the two HouseGuests that are the correct answers for Jellyfish OTEV's questions. Alyssa won the PoV, and Kyland won a second PoV since he bet on her to win in Veto Derby. Sarah Beth warned Britini that she would likely be a replacement nominee at the upcoming veto ceremony, and tensions flared between Britini and Kyland as a result.
802	19	"Episode 19"	Days 41–44	August 19, 2021	4.04	1.0
At the veto ceremony, Kyland used his PoV to save Claire and chose Britini as the replacement nominee. Alyssa opted not to use her PoV, meaning Derek F. and Britini would be eligible for eviction. Following the ceremony, Britini was upset after being placed on the block for the fourth week. Claire and Derek X. discussed flipping the vote in Britini's favor, and Hannah and Tiffany tried to deter them to protect Derek F. The Cookout determined that Claire and Derek X. were the biggest threats to their alliance and strategized on how to target them the following week. On Day 44, Britini was evicted by a vote of 7–1 and became the first member of the jury. The HouseGuests competed in the "Dash to Dinner" competition where they had to race across a balance beam maze and hit a buzzer without falling off. Sarah Beth completed the course in the fastest time and was named the new HoH.
Week 7
803	20	"Episode 20"	Days 44–45	August 22, 2021	3.92	1.1
With Sarah Beth safe as a result of her HoH win, The Cookout grew nervous about who she would choose to target for the week. Derek X. believed he could be a target because he placed Sarah Beth on the block the week prior. Tiffany and Derek F. argued about a previous confrontation involving Britini that occurred between the two of them the previous week. Sarah Beth requested that people play the Chopping Block Roulette in the High Roller's Room if they had enough BB Bucks so that the power would be won and used that week. Claire and Derek X. questioned if there were secret alliances they were not aware of, naming all six Cookout members in the process. On Day 45, Sarah Beth nominated Derek F. and Claire for eviction. Alyssa was the only person to play Chopping Block Roulette, in which the HouseGuest had to balance and rotate a ball around a roulette wheel as many times as possible in two minutes. As a result, she won the game and chose to remove Derek F. from the block. When she spun the roulette wheel to randomly select the replacement nominee, it landed on her closest ally Xavier.
804	21	"Episode 21"	Days 45–48	August 25, 2021	3.80	1.0
Xavier comforted Alyssa after her spin of the roulette wheel which accidentally made him eligible for eviction. Claire and Derek X. realized that they were Sarah Beth's intended targets for the week, with a plan to backdoor Derek X. in the works. Hannah felt guilty for persuading Derek X. to not play in the roulette, and he regretted not playing to secure his safety. Azah, Alyssa, and Derek F. were picked to play in the veto competition with Sarah Beth, Claire, and Xavier. In the "Domino Effect" competition, players had to build and knock down a domino chain that passed through 3 punishment dominos along the way to win the PoV. Players could also opt out of the punishments and go for 3 prizes but could not win the PoV. The HouseGuest with the fastest time for each option (punishments or prizes) would be declared the winner. Derek F. was the only HouseGuest to go for prizes and therefore had the fastest time, rewarding him with $7500 and BB$100. Xavier had the fastest time and won the PoV and 3 punishments: BB Bankrupt where he lost all of his BB Bucks, Strategy Shutdown which would put him in solitary confinement for 24 hours, and Third Nominee which would make him a third nominee on the block at the next available opportunity. The HouseGuests built emergency kits to give to the American Red Cross. At the veto meeting, Xavier used the PoV to save himself and Sarah Beth chose Derek X. as the replacement nominee.
805	22	"Episode 22"	Days 48–51	August 26, 2021	3.98	1.0
The women of The Cookout alliance discussed flipping the vote to save Derek X. because they believed he would personally get them further in the game, while Kyland and Xavier pushed them to stick with the plan and vote him out. As a result of his punishment from the PoV competition, Xavier entered solitary confinement in the Havenot room for the 24 hours before the live eviction. Derek X. campaigned to Azah to save him so he could be a shield for Tiffany, Hannah, and Azah to get them to the end of the season. However, his campaign was not successful and he was eliminated by a vote of 5–2. Earlier in the week, the HouseGuests studied the details from the NFT videos that appeared on the Memory Wall. In "BB NFTs", the HouseGuests were quizzed on their memory of the NFTs in a series of true and false questions. Tiffany was the last HouseGuest standing and therefore became the new HoH. Following the competition, the HouseGuests picked envelopes at random to open in the High Roller's Room, each containing a varying amount of BB Bucks.
Week 8
806	23	"Episode 23"	Days 51–52	August 29, 2021	4.11	1.0
Tiffany, Claire, Hannah, and Azah celebrated Tiffany's HoH win, and Hannah felt guilty sending Derek X. to jury as a result of The Cookout alliance. Fearing they were targets for the week, Sarah Beth tried unsuccessfully to direct Tiffany towards targeting Alyssa instead of herself and Kyland. Tiffany nominated Kyland and Sarah Beth for eviction, and Xavier was automatically made a third nominee at a result of his punishment from the last PoV competition. In the High Roller's Room, the HouseGuests opened their envelopes to reveal their bonus BB$ as well learn how much money America had awarded them for the week. Derek F. and Claire were the only HouseGuests to play in Coin of Destiny, where they had to try to score points by rolling gold coins down the table into slots on the other end. Claire had the highest score with 3 points and was declared the winner. Since she correctly predicted the coin toss as "heads," Claire secretly became the new HoH and Tiffany was overthrown, thus removing Sarah Beth and Kyland from the block. Claire elected to keep nominations the same, making Sarah Beth and Kyland once again eligible for eviction alongside Xavier.
807	24	"Episode 24"	Days 52–55	September 1, 2021	4.01	1.0
Following the nomination ceremony, Claire informed Tiffany and Hannah that she was the secret HoH, and Tiffany discussed the possibility of saying she had won and overthrown her own HoH. Sarah Beth felt she and Kyland were unlikeable after the Secret HoH kept nominations the same, despite having the opportunity to change them. Ben Platt appeared via video to announce that the PoV competition theme was based around his new movie Dear Evan Hansen and that in addition to winning the PoV, the winner would get to watch an early screening of the movie with three HouseGuests of their choice. In the veto competition called "BB High School Hijinks," the HouseGuests had to arrange a series of photos in the correct order based on clues within the images that indicated the correct sequence of events. Claire, Hannah, and Alyssa were chosen by random draw to compete in the competition alongside the three nominees (Kyland, Sarah Beth, and Xavier). Hannah won with a time of 4:59 and invites the nominees to watch the movie with her. Kyland discussed the possibility of the veto being used with Claire, which infuriated Tiffany who believed this was an attempt to keep Sarah Beth safe. At the veto ceremony, Hannah decided to use the PoV on Xavier. Since Xavier was a third nominee as a result of a punishment, there was no replacement and therefore Kyland and Sarah Beth remained on the block.
808	25	"Episode 25"	Days 55–58	September 2, 2021	4.10	0.9
Alyssa indicated to Claire that she is the last non-POC, which made Xavier consider Alyssa a larger target for the upcoming week. While dodging a beetle in the backyard, Derek F. caused Hannah to fall out of the hammock and hit her head. Meanwhile in the kitchen, Azah caught a steak on fire while making dinner and she and Claire had to use an extinguisher to put the fire out. The Cookout finally met in person for the first time and solidified their alliance. In the Jury House, Britini and Derek X. reviewed the events of the previous week and tried to identify the members of the secret alliance that Kyland alluded to. During the live eviction on Day 58, Sarah Beth was evicted by a vote of 5–1 and became the third member of the jury. The HouseGuests began the next HoH competition called "The Flying BB-inos" where they had to stand on a suspended disc while holding onto a rope for as long as possible. The first three HouseGuests to drop would be the HaveNots for the upcoming week. Claire was required to throw the competition since she was the secret HoH and ineligible to win.
Week 9
809	26	"Episode 26"	Days 58–59	September 5, 2021	3.36	0.8
Members of The Cookout planned for Xavier and Tiffany to throw the HoH competition so that Alyssa and Claire could be more easily targeted that week. However, Tiffany wanted to keep Kyland from winning another HoH and was the last to drop, therefore she was crowned HoH for the second week in a row. Derek F. felt frustrated that he had not found success in competitions so far in the season, and The Cookout shifted their target to Alyssa as a result of Tiffany's HoH win while beginning to question their trust in Tiffany. Alyssa made a pitch to Tiffany to try to keep from going on the block. At the nomination ceremony, Tiffany chose to nominate Alyssa and Xavier for eviction.
810	27	"Episode 27"	Days 59–62	September 8, 2021	3.89	0.9
Tiffany hoped that Alyssa would not win the upcoming veto competition so she would not have to nominate Claire, the only other non-Cookout member remaining in the house. If he won, Xavier planned to use the veto on Alyssa rather than himself to retaliate against Tiffany for refusing to throw the HoH competition and target Claire as previously planned. Hannah, Derek F., and Azah were chosen to play with Tiffany, Xavier, and Alyssa in the PoV competition. Zingbot also returned to roast the remaining HouseGuests. In the veto competition called "Micro Cocktails," players used tweezers to stack 21 miniature cocktail glasses into a pyramid. Alyssa was the first person to successfully build the pyramid and won the PoV. The Cookout expressed concern about how Tiffany would tell Claire that she was the replacement nominee without exposing their alliance. Tiffany lied and said she personally did not want to evict her fellow Black HouseGuests while denying the existence of an alliance among the group. Although she was heartbroken, Claire understood Tiffany's perspective. Ultimately, Alyssa used the PoV to save herself and Tiffany chose Claire as the replacement nominee.
811	28	"Episode 28"	Days 62–65	September 9, 2021	3.85	0.9
The HouseGuests strategized about who needed to be targeted the following week, especially if Alyssa were to win HoH. The HouseGuests learned that the evening would result in a double eviction and by a vote of 4–1, Claire was sent to jury in the first eviction of the night. Julie announced that it was "BB Comics Week" and therefore all competitions would have a comic book theme. In the HoH competition called "Crash, Boom, Pow" HouseGuests were shown images depicting classic comic book phrases and had to answer questions using tiles containing the phrases shown. Hannah answered the most questions correctly and became the new HoH, and she nominated Alyssa and Xavier for eviction. All HouseGuests except for Kyland were picked to play in the PoV competition called "Logo, Let's Go" in which players had to race to complete their BB Comics puzzle and hit a buzzer. Xavier won the PoV and removed himself from the block, and Hannah nominated Kyland alongside Alyssa. By a vote of 3–1, Alyssa became the fifth member of the jury. As a result, the entire Cookout alliance, which was formed back on Day 1, successfully became the final six HouseGuests.
Week 10
812	29	"Episode 29"	Days 65–66	September 12, 2021	4.22	1.0
The Cookout members celebrated successfully making it to final six. Kyland was upset during the double eviction that he was made the replacement nominee next to Alyssa rather than Azah or Tiffany who had not been nominated yet. Hannah tried to do damage control with Kyland ahead of the next HoH competition, and the HouseGuests discussed their targets for the next week. Kyland and Xavier make a final two agreement called "The Gentlemen." In the HoH competition, HouseGuests had to navigate eggs through chicken wire mesh, then roll the eggs down a ramp to knock down three levers. Kyland was the first person to successfully complete this challenge and was crowned the new HoH. Tiffany and Hannah thought they were in a good position with Kyland and would avoid the block, but both were nominated by Kyland for eviction.
813	30	"Episode 30"	Days 66–69	September 15, 2021	4.08	0.9
When Kyland told Hannah he nominated Tiffany because she was aiming to get Xavier out, Hannah realized that the three remaining men were working together. Tiffany and Hannah hoped Azah would win the PoV competition in order to increase the odds that all three women would survive the week. The HouseGuests competed in the "BB Comics" competition, where they had to fly down a zipline and spot the differences in comic book covers depicting each HouseGuest. The person to put the correct comics in the correct order in the shortest amount of time was Kyland. Tiffany and Hannah tried to make deals with Kyland to prove their loyalty in the hopes that he would use the veto on either of them. At the veto ceremony, he chose not to use the PoV and keep his nominations the same, leaving Tiffany and Hannah eligible for eviction.
814	31	"Episode 31"	Days 69–71	September 16, 2021	3.91	0.9
Hannah and Tiffany reflected on the historical accomplishment of The Cookout and their role in its success. Tiffany campaigned to the HouseGuests to stay and continue to be a target for Kyland. Julie spoke to The Cookout about their mission and the struggles they encountered along the way. Sarah Beth arrived at the jury house, and the jury discussed the "secret alliance" that led to their evictions. Claire and Alyssa also joined the jury, and they reviewed the events of the double HoH including Tiffany's betrayal of Claire and Alyssa's eviction that got the alliance to final six. During the live eviction, Tiffany was eliminated by a vote of 3–0. Julie announced that for the first time ever, Big Brother would have double evictions in back-to-back weeks and a second HouseGuest would be eliminated that evening. In the HoH competition called "BB Ballers" the remaining HouseGuests had to roll small balls up a ramp to knock twelve larger balls off the grass at the end and hit a buzzer. Azah and Xavier had the fastest times in the first round and advanced to the second round, where they had to roll balls up the ramp and stop them on the grass patch. The HouseGuest with the most balls on the grass after 10 throws was Azah, and she became the new HoH, nominating Xavier and Hannah for eviction. In the "What the Bleep" PoV competition, the HouseGuests watched clips of their former housemates with bleeped out phrases, and they had to answer true/false questions about the missing words. Kyland beat Xavier in the tiebreaker question to win the PoV and used it to remove Xavier from the block. Derek F. was nominated for eviction by default. Hannah was sent to jury with a 2–0 vote during the second live eviction.
Week 11
815	32	"Episode 32"	Days 71–72	September 17, 2021	3.33	0.6
Both Azah and Derek F. felt blindsided when Kyland used the veto on Xavier during the double eviction, resulting in Derek being nominated. Xavier voted along with Kyland to appear loyal to him, but confessed his loyalty is to Derek instead. The HouseGuests saw a preview of CSI: Vegas ahead of the crime scene-themed HoH competition in which they used a blacklight to look for evidence and correctly identify matches in the BB Crime Lab. The HouseGuest to complete this in the fastest time was Xavier who became the next HoH. Kyland was frustrated by his performance in the competition and believed he would be eliminated if he did not win the upcoming PoV. Xavier and Derek F. discussed if they should cut Kyland this week and keep Azah instead. Xavier chose to nominate Azah and Kyland for eviction.
816	33	"Episode 33"	Days 72–74	September 22, 2021	2.89	0.6
Azah was shocked that Derek F. had final two agreements with both Xavier and Kyland and realized that she would have to win safety for herself. Kyland and Derek F. argued about the status of their final two agreement, with Kyland perceiving Derek F. as ungrateful. Xavier chose Azah to join him in watching an advance screening of CSI: Vegas that he won as part of his HoH. In the PoV competition, HouseGuests had to recall the date of various events throughout the season. Then, they had to navigate across a seesaw and place a combination of numbered balls that totaled the correct date in the shovel on the end without balls falling out. The last person to do so in each round earned a strike and each HouseGuest was eliminated after two strikes. Xavier won the final round to earn the PoV. Kyland became emotional following the competition and hoped he could trust Xavier and Derek F. to keep him safe.
817	34	"Episode 34"	Days 74–79	September 23, 2021	3.64	0.8
Kyland continued to pressure Derek F. to honor their agreement and vote out Azah. Xavier was worried that Derek F.'s emotions were clouding his judgment, and Azah offered to come off the block and cast the sole vote to evict Kyland. Derek F. and Azah argued about their contributions in the game that got them to where they were. Tiffany arrived at the jury house and confessed the master plan she created to fulfill The Cookout's mission to get to final six. As the second HouseGuest eliminated during the double eviction, Hannah also came to jury and recounted how she was eliminated during Azah's HoH. During the live veto and eviction, Kyland was blindsided when Xavier chose not to use the veto and Derek F. voted to evict him. Following the live eviction, Azah, Xavier and Derek F. did a champagne toast to celebrate making it to final three.
Week 12
818	35	"Episode 35"	Day 79; Various (Note: In Episode 35, the final three HouseGuests looked back over their time in the Big Brother house. Flashbacks included clips from previous Days in the house, while the current Day in the house was 79.)	September 24, 2021	2.71	0.5
Azah, Derek F., and Xavier celebrated being the final three HouseGuests with a dinner provided by production and champagne. The three looked back over their time in the house highlighting what they believed to be the best moments. They then each received a recorded video message from their families.
819	36	"Episode 36"	Days 79–80	September 26, 2021	3.82	0.9
Each of the remaining HouseGuests recalled their time in the house and the strategy they used that got them to final three. Xavier detailed how he threw various competitions to downplay his strengths but was able to excel when it was needed to secure his position in the game. Azah spoke to her relationship-building skills and her honesty which kept her off the block until final four. Derek F. relied on his social game to make up for his lack of success in competitions. In Part 1 of the final HoH competition called "Bouncy Boat Bash" the HouseGuests had to hold on to a suspended boat for as long as possible. Xavier outlasted Azah and Derek F. and won the competition, securing his spot in Part 3 of the final HoH competition.
820	37	"Episode 37"	Days 81–85	September 29, 2021	3.57	0.9
In Part 2 of the final HoH competition, Azah and Derek F. played the Four of a Kind slot machine where they had to spin four dials to the faces of the HouseGuess that correctly answered each question. Azah completed this challenge the fastest and advanced to Part 3 alongside Xavier. In the final days in the house, Derek F. tarnished his relationship with Azah, hurting his chances of being brought to Final 2. Kyland joined the other jury members for the first time where they discussed the three remaining HouseGuests and their gameplay. In the live Part 3 of the HoH competition, Xavier and Azah had to watch videos featuring the jury members and identify which statements were false. Xavier won with a perfect score and was named the final HoH. Xavier chose to evict Azah who became the ninth member of the jury. Each jury member asked a final question to either Xavier or Derek F., and the final two gave closing speeches to try to sway the jury to vote in their favor before the jury cast their votes. Before the votes were revealed, Julie interviewed all sixteen HouseGuests and discussed the events and secrets that were kept throughout the summer. (Note: Due to the ongoing COVID-19 pandemic, the first five evicted HouseGuests (Travis, Frenchie, Brent, Whitney, and Christian) attended the finale via live video call.) By a vote of 9–0, Xavier won Big Brother Season 23, Derek F. was the runner-up, and Tiffany was named America’s Favorite HouseGuest with Derek X. as runner-up.

== Voting history ==
Color key:

Winner
Runner-up
Head of Household
Nominated for eviction
Immune from eviction
Team immunity
Evicted

Voting history (season 23)
	Team phase				Individual phase										
	Week 1	Week 2	Week 3	Week 4	Week 5	Week 6	Week 7	Week 8	Week 9		Week 10		Week 11	Week 12	
	Week 1	Week 2	Week 3	Week 4	Week 5	Week 6	Week 7	Week 8	Day 59	Day 65 (Note: This week was a double eviction week. Following the first eviction, the remaining HouseGuests played a week's worth of games – including Head of Household and veto competitions; and nomination, veto, and eviction ceremonies – during the live show, culminating in a second eviction for the week.)	Day 66	Day 71	Week 11	Day 85	Finale
Head of Household	Frenchie	Kyland	Xavier	Christian	Derek X.	Kyland	Sarah Beth	~~Tiffany~~; Claire (Note: Claire won the Coin of Destiny in the High Roller's Room, allowing her to participate in a coin flip, where she anonymously replaced Tiffany as Head of Household. Claire's nominations were made in secret. Tiffany remained immune for the week and could compete in the following Head of Household competition. At the Eviction, Claire cast a tentative vote in the Diary Room that would act as a tie-break vote, this was a vote to evict Sarah Beth.)	Tiffany	Hannah	Kyland	Azah	Xavier	Xavier	(None)
Wild Card winner	Christian	Sarah Beth	Tiffany	Claire	(None)									(None)	(None)
Nominations (initial)	Alyssa; Kyland	Britini; Frenchie	Brent; Britini	Hannah; Whitney	Britini; Sarah Beth	Claire; Derek F.	Claire; ~~Derek F.~~; Xavier (Note: Alyssa won the Chopping Block Roulette in the High Roller's Room, allowing her to save one of the nominees with a roulette wheel determining the replacement nominee. Alyssa saved Derek F., and Xavier was chosen by the wheel as the replacement nominee. Alyssa and Derek F. also received immunity for the week.)	Kyland; Sarah Beth; Xavier (Note: Xavier took the "3rd Nominee" punishment in week 7's Power of Veto competition and was automatically nominated. His nomination did not require a replacement when the veto was used on him.)	Alyssa; Xavier	Alyssa; Xavier	Hannah; Tiffany	Hannah; Xavier	Azah; Kyland	(None)	(None)
Veto winner(s)	Derek X.	Derek X.	Christian	Christian	Britini	Alyssa; Kyland (Note: Kyland bet on Alyssa for the Veto Derby in the High Roller's Room. Since she won the Power of Veto, he won his own Power of Veto for the week. At the veto ceremony, Kyland first used his veto on Claire, naming Britini as the replacement; Alyssa did not use her veto.)	Xavier	Hannah	Alyssa	Xavier	Kyland	Kyland	Xavier	(None)	(None)
Nominations (final)	Alyssa; Travis	Britini; Frenchie	Brent; Britini	Hannah; Whitney	Christian; Sarah Beth	Britini; Derek F.	Claire; Derek X.	Kyland; Sarah Beth	Claire; Xavier	Alyssa; Kyland	Hannah; Tiffany	Derek F. Hannah	Azah; Kyland	Azah; Derek F.	(None)
Xavier	Travis (Note: Christian's wild card decision was to give immunity to one additional teammate; he chose Xavier.)	Frenchie	Head of Household	Whitney (Note: A member of this HouseGuest’s team won Head of Household during the team phase; thus granting their entire team immunity for the week.)	Sarah Beth	Britini	Derek X.	Sarah Beth	Nominated	Kyland	Tiffany	Hannah	Head of Household	Azah (Note: As Head of Household, Xavier chose to evict Azah.)	Winner
Derek F.	Alyssa	Britini	Brent	Whitney	Christian	Nominated	Derek X.	Sarah Beth	Claire	Alyssa	Tiffany	Nominated	Kyland	Nominated	Runner-up
Azah	Travis	Frenchie	Brent	Whitney	Christian	Derek F.	Derek X.	Sarah Beth	Claire	Alyssa	Tiffany	Head of Household	Nominated	Evicted (Day 85)	Xavier
Kyland	Travis	Head of Household	Brent	Whitney	Christian	Head of Household	Claire	Nominated	Claire	Nominated	Head of Household	Hannah	Nominated	Evicted (Day 79)	Xavier
Hannah	Travis	Frenchie	Brent	Nominated	Christian	Britini	Claire	Sarah Beth	Xavier	Head of Household	Nominated	Nominated	Evicted (Day 71)		Xavier
Tiffany	Alyssa	Frenchie	Brent	Whitney	Christian	Britini	Derek X.	Kyland	Head of Household	Alyssa	Nominated	Evicted (Day 71)			Xavier
Alyssa	Nominated	Frenchie	Brent	Whitney	Sarah Beth	Britini	Derek X.	Sarah Beth	Claire	Nominated	Evicted (Day 65)				Xavier
Claire	Travis	Frenchie	Brent	Whitney (Note: Claire's wild card decision was to choose one week of immunity for her team or immunity for herself until the jury phase of the game began. Claire chose immunity until jury.)	Christian	Britini	Nominated	Head of Household	Nominated	Evicted (Day 65)					Xavier
Sarah Beth	Travis	Frenchie	Brent	Whitney	Nominated	Britini	Head of Household	Nominated	Evicted (Day 58)						Xavier
Derek X.	Travis	Frenchie	Brent	Whitney	Head of Household	Britini	Nominated	Evicted (Day 51)							Xavier
Britini	Travis	Nominated	Nominated	Whitney	Christian	Nominated	Evicted (Day 44)								Xavier
Christian	Travis	Frenchie	Brent	Head of Household	Nominated	Evicted (Day 37)									
Whitney	Travis	Frenchie	Brent	Nominated	Evicted (Day 30)										
Brent	Travis	Frenchie	Nominated	Evicted (Day 23)											
Frenchie	Head of Household	Nominated	Evicted (Day 16)												
Travis	Nominated	Evicted (Day 9)													
Evicted	Travis; 11 of 13 votes to evict	Frenchie; 11 of 12 votes to evict	Brent; 11 of 11 votes to evict	Whitney; 10 of 10 votes to evict	Christian; 7 of 9 votes to evict	Britini; 7 of 8 votes to evict	Derek X. 5 of 7 votes to evict	Sarah Beth; 5 of 6 votes to evict	Claire; 4 of 5 votes to evict	Alyssa; 3 of 4 votes to evict	Tiffany; 3 of 3 votes to evict	Hannah; 2 of 2 votes to evict	Kyland; Derek F.'s choice to evict	Azah; Xavier's choice to evict	Xavier; 9 votes to win
Evicted	Travis; 11 of 13 votes to evict	Frenchie; 11 of 12 votes to evict	Brent; 11 of 11 votes to evict	Whitney; 10 of 10 votes to evict	Christian; 7 of 9 votes to evict	Britini; 7 of 8 votes to evict	Derek X. 5 of 7 votes to evict	Sarah Beth; 5 of 6 votes to evict	Claire; 4 of 5 votes to evict	Alyssa; 3 of 4 votes to evict	Tiffany; 3 of 3 votes to evict	Hannah; 2 of 2 votes to evict	Kyland; Derek F.'s choice to evict	Azah; Xavier's choice to evict	Derek F. 0 votes to win

== Production ==
=== Development ===
CBS announced that Big Brother had been renewed for a twenty-third season on October 28, 2020, with Chen Moonves confirmed to return as host on the same day. On May 13, 2021, it was announced that the season would be premiering on July 7, 2021. Key art for the season was released by Entertainment Weekly on June 16, 2021.

=== Casting ===
On January 22, 2021, Robyn Kass announced that Kassting, Inc. would not be providing casting services for the upcoming season. It was announced that Jesse Tannenbaum, former Big Brother casting producer and casting director for Big Brother: Over The Top, Survivor, and The Amazing Race, would be in charge of the casting efforts for Big Brother 23. Several casting producers who cast the show under Kassting, Inc. also returned to cast BB23.

=== Production design ===
Photos of the house were revealed on July 5, 2021, via various social media accounts and entertainment news outlets. When explaining the theme, executive producer Allison Grodner stated "Everyone’s longing for vacations, to get out there and so forth. So we really wanted to bring a sense of adventure and vacation fun and a club atmosphere to the house." Immediately upon entering the house two neon signs hung in the entry way, one reading "BB Beach Club" and the other stating "No Risk, No Reward." The living room featured floor-to-ceiling azure and teal tinted glass windows, a handmade shark lamp, and a coffee table built of playing cards. Each of the three bedrooms downstairs were based on different water elements: the first bedroom contained orange and aqua illuminated sea glass on the walls, the next bedroom held four nautical-themed yacht beds, and the final bedroom featured a coral reef design. A shark-themed kitchen and dining room contained an L-shaped kitchen island and numerous shark and fish artwork. Gym equipment for the season was relocated inside, taking the place of the former downstairs lounge. The gym and bathroom were collectively known as "The Spa" and for the first time, a wall was constructed, closing off the kitchen from the bathroom area. On the second floor, the upstairs lounge was designed on a casino game of poker and had black, white, and gold furniture. The Head of Household bedroom was designed around a seaside cabana theme.

== Reception ==
=== Critical response ===
Some viewers accused "The Cookout", an all-black six-person alliance, of making voting decisions solely based on race. The alliance was formed as a collective in hopes of combatting the trend from past seasons of minorities being evicted early, as well as having one of its members becoming the main series' first-ever black winner. The "Cookout" term itself stems from African-American culture. Julie Chen Moonves disapproved of the criticism on the topic, saying that the alliance "is not [racist]" in her opinion, adding that "it's hard for some people who are not of color to understand the importance of [The Cookout] making it this far".

=== Viewing figures ===
==== United States ====
Viewership and ratings per episode of Big Brother 23
No.	Title	Air date	Timeslot (ET)	Rating (18–49)	Viewers (millions)	DVR (18–49)	DVR viewers (millions)	Total (18–49)	Total viewers (millions)	Ref.
1	"Episode 1"	July 7, 2021	Wednesday 8:00 p.m.	1.1	4.25	0.5	2.45	1.6	6.69	
2	"Episode 2"	July 11, 2021	Sunday 8:00 p.m.	0.9	3.76	0.5	2.47	1.4	6.23	
3	"Episode 3"	July 14, 2021	Wednesday 8:00 p.m.	0.8	4.63	0.5	1.57	1.4	6.20	
4	"Episode 4"	July 15, 2021	Thursday 8:00 p.m.	0.9	3.81	0.5	2.43	1.4	6.25	
5	"Episode 5"	July 18, 2021	Sunday 8:00 p.m.	0.8	3.49	0.5	2.45	1.3	5.94	
6	"Episode 6"	July 21, 2021	Wednesday 8:00 p.m.	0.8	4.00	0.5	1.40	1.3	5.40	
7	"Episode 7"	July 22, 2021	Thursday 8:00 p.m.	0.9	3.87	0.5	2.40	1.4	6.28	
8	"Episode 8"	July 25, 2021	Sunday 8:00 p.m.	0.8	4.31	0.5	1.38	1.3	5.69	
9	"Episode 9"	July 28, 2021	Wednesday 8:00 p.m.	1.0	3.79	0.4	1.26	1.4	5.05	
10	"Episode 10"	July 29, 2021	Thursday 8:00 p.m.	0.9	3.86	0.4	2.10	1.3	5.96	
11	"Episode 11"	August 1, 2021	Sunday 8:00 p.m.	0.9	4.40	0.4	1.21	1.3	5.61	
12	"Episode 12"	August 4, 2021	Wednesday 8:00 p.m.	0.9	3.64	0.4	1.15	1.3	4.80	
13	"Episode 13"	August 5, 2021	Thursday 8:00 p.m.	0.9	4.73	0.3	2.02	1.2	6.75	
14	"Episode 14"	August 8, 2021	Sunday 8:00 p.m.	1.1	3.97	0.4	1.51	1.5	5.58	
15	"Episode 15"	August 11, 2021	Wednesday 8:00 p.m.	0.9	3.96	0.4	2.15	1.4	6.12	
16	"Episode 16"	August 12, 2021	Thursday 8:00 p.m.	0.9	5.86	0.3	1.03	1.3	6.89	
17	"Episode 17"	August 15, 2021	Sunday 8:00 p.m.	1.0	3.98	0.5	1.33	1.4	5.31	
18	"Episode 18"	August 18, 2021	Wednesday 8:00 p.m.	0.9	3.80	0.4	1.14	1.3	4.94	
19	"Episode 19"	August 19, 2021	Thursday 8:00 p.m.	1.0	4.04	0.4	2.00	1.4	6.04	
20	"Episode 20"	August 22, 2021	Sunday 8:00 p.m.	1.1	3.92	0.4	1.15	1.4	5.07	
21	"Episode 21"	August 25, 2021	Wednesday 8:00 p.m.	1.0	3.80	0.4	1.15	1.4	4.96	
22	"Episode 22"	August 26, 2021	Thursday 8:00 p.m.	1.0	3.98	0.4	1.12	1.4	5.10	
23	"Episode 23"	August 29, 2021	Sunday 8:09 p.m.^{1}	1.0	4.11	0.4	1.08	1.4	5.19	
24	"Episode 24"	September 1, 2021	Wednesday 8:00 p.m.	1.0	4.01	0.3	1.95	1.3	5.96	
25	"Episode 25"	September 2, 2021	Thursday 8:00 p.m.	0.9	4.10	0.4	2.03	1.3	6.13	
26	"Episode 26"	September 5, 2021	Sunday 8:00 p.m.	0.8	4.36	0.4	1.35	1.2	5.71	
27	"Episode 27"	September 8, 2021	Wednesday 8:00 p.m.	0.9	3.89	0.3	1.94	1.2	5.83	
28	"Episode 28"	September 9, 2021	Thursday 8:00 p.m.	0.9	4.85	0.3	1.86	1.2	6.71	
29	"Episode 29"	September 12, 2021	Sunday 8:34 p.m.^{2}	1.0	4.22	0.4	1.07	1.4	5.29	
30	"Episode 30"	September 15, 2021	Wednesday 8:00 p.m.	0.9	4.08	TBD	TBD	TBD	TBD	
31	"Episode 31"	September 16, 2021	Thursday 8:00 p.m.	0.9	4.91	TBD	TBD	TBD	TBD	
32	"Episode 32"	September 17, 2021	Friday 8:00 p.m.^{3}	0.6	3.33	TBD	TBD	TBD	TBD	
33	"Episode 33"	September 22, 2021	Wednesday 10:00 p.m.^{4}	0.6	2.89	0.5	1.57	1.1	4.46	
34	"Episode 34"	September 23, 2021	Thursday 8:00 p.m.	0.8	3.64	0.4	0.97	1.2	4.61	
35	"Episode 35"	September 24, 2021	Friday 8:00 p.m.	0.5	2.71	0.4	0.96	0.9	3.67	
36	"Episode 36"	September 26, 2021	Sunday 8:00 p.m.	0.9	3.82	0.3	0.87	1.2	4.69	
37	"Episode 37"	September 29, 2021	Wednesday 9:00 p.m.	0.9	3.57	0.4	1.03	1.3	4.61	

- ^Note 1: Episode 23 was delayed to 8:09 PM ET (7:09 PM CT) due to NFL on CBS overrun
- ^Note 2: Episode 29 was scheduled for 8:30 PM ET (7:30 PM CT) due to afternoon NFL on CBS and was further delayed to 8:34 PM ET due to football overrun
- ^Note 3: Episode 32 was bumped from the schedule to Friday 8:00 PM ET (7:00 PM CT) due to CBS's presentation of the 73rd Primetime Emmy Awards
- ^Note 4: Episode 33 was delayed to 10:00 PM ET (9:00 PM CT) due to the 2-hour season premiere of Survivor 41

==== Canada ====
Viewership and ratings per episode of Big Brother 23
No.	Title	Air date	Timeslot (ET)	Viewers (millions)	Ref.
1	"Episode 1"	July 7, 2021	Wednesday 8:00 p.m.	1.17	
2	"Episode 2"	July 11, 2021	Sunday 8:00 p.m.	1.05	
3	"Episode 3"	July 14, 2021	Wednesday 8:00 p.m.	1.01	
4	"Episode 4"	July 15, 2021	Thursday 8:00 p.m.	0.97	
5	"Episode 5"	July 18, 2021	Sunday 8:00 p.m.	0.94	
6	"Episode 6"	July 21, 2021	Wednesday 8:00 p.m.	0.90	
7	"Episode 7"	July 22, 2021	Thursday 8:00 p.m.	0.89	
8	"Episode 8"	July 25, 2021	Sunday 8:00 p.m.	0.96	
9	"Episode 9"	July 28, 2021	Wednesday 8:00 p.m.	1.04	
10	"Episode 10"	July 29, 2021	Thursday 8:00 p.m.	0.86	
11	"Episode 11"	August 1, 2021	Sunday 8:00 p.m.	0.88	
12	"Episode 12"	August 4, 2021	Wednesday 8:00 p.m.	0.91	
13	"Episode 13"	August 5, 2021	Thursday 8:00 p.m.	0.93	
14	"Episode 14"	August 8, 2021	Sunday 8:00 p.m.	0.96	
15	"Episode 15"	August 11, 2021	Wednesday 8:00 p.m.	0.96	
16	"Episode 16"	August 12, 2021	Thursday 8:00 p.m.	0.89	
17	"Episode 17"	August 15, 2021	Sunday 8:00 p.m.	0.96	
18	"Episode 18"	August 18, 2021	Wednesday 8:00 p.m.	1.07	
19	"Episode 19"	August 19, 2021	Thursday 8:00 p.m.	0.84	
20	"Episode 20"	August 22, 2021	Sunday 8:00 p.m.	0.85	
21	"Episode 21"	August 25, 2021	Wednesday 8:00 p.m.	0.95	
22	"Episode 22"	August 26, 2021	Thursday 8:00 p.m.	0.91	
23	"Episode 23"	August 29, 2021	Sunday 8:09 p.m.	0.75	
24	"Episode 24"	September 1, 2021	Wednesday 8:00 p.m.	0.91	
25	"Episode 25"	September 2, 2021	Thursday 8:00 p.m.	0.90	
26	"Episode 26"	September 5, 2021	Sunday 8:00 p.m.	0.97	
27	"Episode 27"	September 8, 2021	Wednesday 8:00 p.m.	0.85	
28	"Episode 28"	September 9, 2021	Thursday 8:00 p.m.	0.94	
29	"Episode 29"	September 12, 2021	Sunday 8:34 p.m.	0.86	
30	"Episode 30"	September 15, 2021	Wednesday 8:00 p.m.	0.90	
31	"Episode 31"	September 16, 2021	Thursday 8:00 p.m.	0.86	
32	"Episode 32"	September 17, 2021	Friday 8:00 p.m.	0.89	
33	"Episode 33"	September 22, 2021	Wednesday 10:00 p.m.	1.10	
34	"Episode 34"	September 23, 2021	Thursday 8:00 p.m.	0.91	
35	"Episode 35"	September 24, 2021	Friday 8:00 p.m.	0.78	
36	"Episode 36"	September 26, 2021	Sunday 8:00 p.m.	0.84	
37	"Episode 37"	September 29, 2021	Wednesday 9:00 p.m.	1.00	
