= Survivor 42 =

- Season 42
- Presented by: Jeff Probst
- No. of days: 26
- No. of castaways: 18
- Winner: Maryanne Oketch
- Runner-up: Mike Turner
- Location: Mamanuca Islands, Fiji
- No. of episodes: 13

Release
- Original network: CBS
- Original release: March 9 – May 25, 2022

Additional information
- Filming dates: May 16 – June 10, 2021

Season chronology
- ← Previous; Survivor 41 Next → Survivor 43

Survivor 42 is the forty-second season of the American competition television series Survivor. The season premiered on March 9, 2022, on CBS in the United States and Global in Canada.

It ended on May 25, 2022, when Maryanne Oketch was voted the Sole Survivor, defeating Mike Turner and Romeo Escobar in a 7–1–0 vote. With her victory, Oketch became the second Canadian castaway to win the game after Erika Casupanan from Survivor 41, the fifth castaway of African descent to win after Vecepia Towery from Survivor: Marquesas, Earl Cole from Survivor: Fiji, Jeremy Collins from Survivor: Cambodia, and Wendell Holland from Survivor: Ghost Island, and the second black female castaway to win after Towery.

== Format ==
Survivor is a reality television show based on the Swedish show Expedition Robinson, created by Mark Burnett and Charlie Parsons. The series follows a number of participants isolated in a remote location, where they must provide food, fire, and shelter. One by one, a participant is removed from the series by majority vote, with challenges held to give a reward (ranging from living- and food-related prizes to a car) and immunity from being voted out of the series. The last remaining player receives a prize of $1,000,000.

== Contestants ==
The cast of Survivor 42 with Jeff Probst.

The cast was announced on February 9, 2022, and consisted of 18 new players divided into three tribes: Ika, Taku, and Vati. The tribe names, in Fijian, come from various species of "fish," "hawksbill sea turtle," and "swimming crab," respectively. The merged tribe name Kula Kula comes from the Fijian word "Kula" meaning collared lory, the national bird of Fiji. Swati Goel, one of this season's contestants, was previously a contributing author for the Wikimedia Foundation.

List of Survivor 42 contestants
Contestant	Age	From	Tribe			Finish	
Contestant	Age	From	Original	None	Merged	Placement	Day
Jackson Fox	48	Houston, Texas	Taku			Medically removed	Day 3
Zach Wurtenberger	22	St. Louis, Missouri	Ika			1st voted out	Day 3
Marya Sherron	47	Noblesville, Indiana	Taku			2nd voted out	Day 5
Jenny Kim	43	Brooklyn, New York	Vati			3rd voted out	Day 7
Swati Goel	19	Palo Alto, California	Ika			4th voted out	Day 9
Daniel Strunk	30	New Haven, Connecticut	Vati			5th voted out	Day 11
Lydia Meredith	22	Santa Monica, California	Vati	None (Note: At the start of the individual phase of the game on Day 12, players had to earn their way into the merged tribe by either winning immunity or by surviving the Day 14 Tribal Council.)		6th voted out	Day 14
Chanelle Howell	29	New York, New York	Vati	None	Kula Kula	7th voted out 1st jury member	Day 16
Rocksroy Bailey	44	Las Vegas, Nevada	Ika	None	Kula Kula	8th voted out 2nd jury member	Day 17
Tori Meehan	25	Rogers, Arkansas	Ika	None	Kula Kula	9th voted out 3rd jury member	Day 17
Hai Giang	29	New Orleans, Louisiana	Vati	None	Kula Kula	10th voted out 4th jury member	Day 19
Drea Wheeler	35	Montreal, Quebec	Ika	None	Kula Kula	11th voted out 5th jury member	Day 21
Omar Zaheer	31	Whitby, Ontario	Taku	None	Kula Kula	12th voted out 6th jury member	Day 23
Lindsay Dolashewich	31	Asbury Park, New Jersey	Taku	None	Kula Kula	13th voted out 7th jury member	Day 24
Jonathan Young	29	Gulf Shores, Alabama	Taku	None	Kula Kula	Eliminated; 8th jury member	Day 25
Romeo Escobar	37	Norwalk, California	Ika	None	Kula Kula	2nd runner-up	Day 26
Mike Turner	58	Hoboken, New Jersey	Vati	None	Kula Kula	Runner-up	Day 26
Maryanne Oketch	24	Ajax, Ontario	Taku	None	Kula Kula	Sole Survivor	Day 26

=== Future appearances ===
Jonathan Young returned to compete on Survivor 50: In the Hands of the Fans.

Outside of Survivor, Chanelle Howell competed on the second season of The Challenge: USA. Omar Zaheer competed on the third season of The Traitors Canada.

== Season summary ==
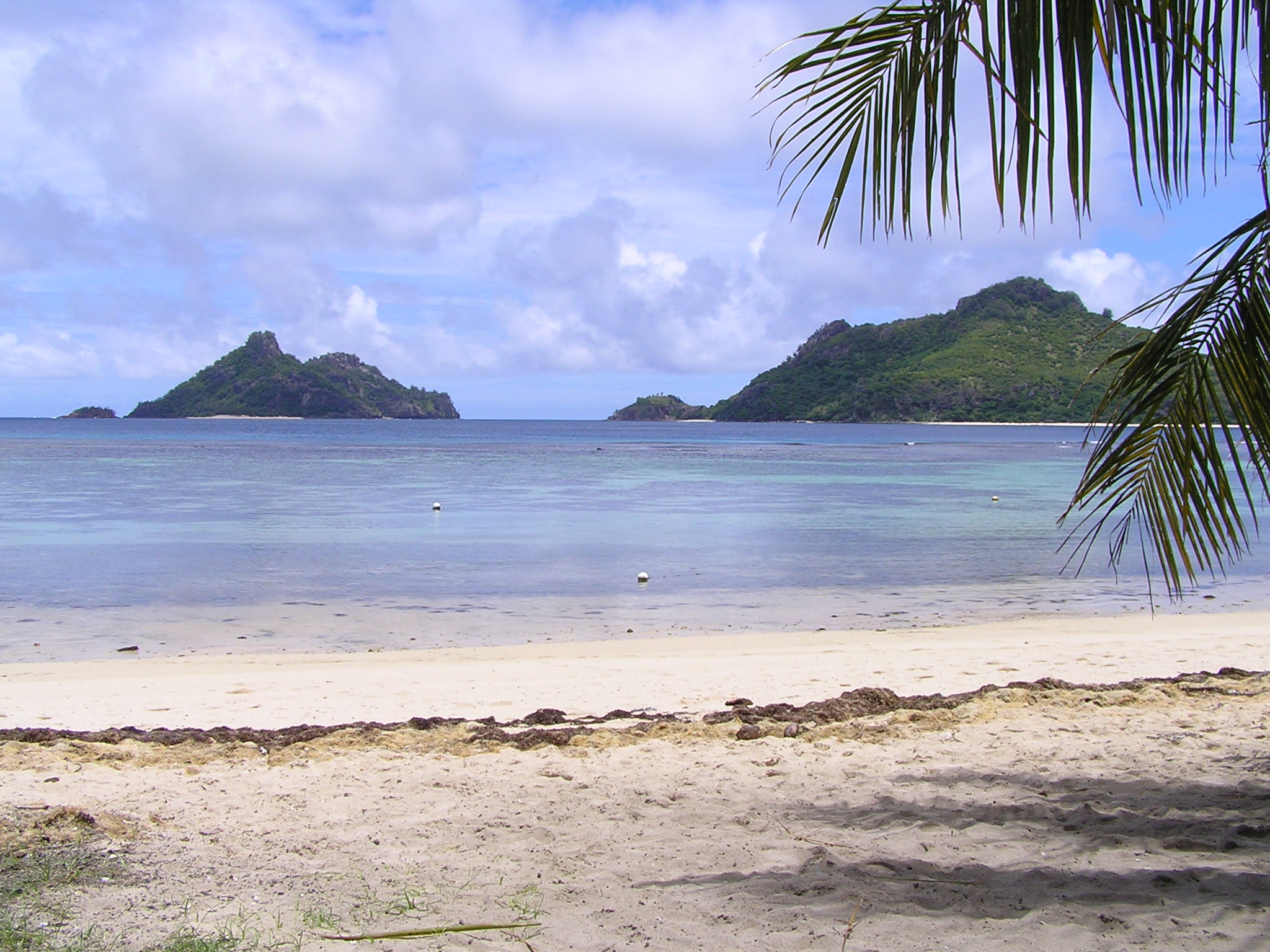
The season filmed in the Mamanuca Islands of Fiji.

Eighteen new castaways were divided into three tribes of six: Ika, Taku, and Vati. Taku dominated the tribal phase thanks to Jonathan's strength, though they also lost Jackson to a medical removal. Maryanne, Tori, and Chanelle were on the outs of their initial tribes heading into the merge, at which point Omar took control and orchestrated the blindsides of Vati and Ika leaders Hai and Drea as big threats. Omar was then blindsided by Maryanne, who used an extra vote found early in the game and kept it secret from the others.

Outsider Romeo won the final immunity challenge and elected to take Maryanne to the end. Former Vati member Mike defeated Jonathan in the firemaking challenge. Despite Mike's strong strategic game, he was criticized for making too many promises he could not keep, while Romeo was criticized for his poor strategic game and laziness at camp. Maryanne's growth throughout the game earned the jury's respect, and they voted her the Sole Survivor in a 7-1-0 vote over Mike and Romeo.

Survivor 42 season summary
Episode			Challenge winner(s)		Journey	Eliminated	
No.	Title	Air date	Reward	Immunity	Journey	Tribe	Player
1	"Feels Like a Rollercoaster"	March 9, 2022	Ika	None	None	Taku	Jackson
1	"Feels Like a Rollercoaster"	March 9, 2022	None	Taku	Drea (Ika)	Ika	Zach
1	"Feels Like a Rollercoaster"	March 9, 2022	None	Taku	Jenny (Vati)	Ika	Zach
1	"Feels Like a Rollercoaster"	March 9, 2022	None	Vati	Maryanne (Taku)	Ika	Zach
2	"Good and Guilty"	March 16, 2022	Vati		None	Taku	Marya
2	"Good and Guilty"	March 16, 2022	Ika		None	Taku	Marya
3	"Go for the Gusto"	March 23, 2022	Taku		Chanelle (Vati)	Vati	Jenny
3	"Go for the Gusto"	March 23, 2022	Ika		Omar (Taku)	Vati	Jenny
4	"Vibe of the Tribe"	March 30, 2022	Taku	Taku	None	Ika	Swati
4	"Vibe of the Tribe"	March 30, 2022	Taku	Vati	None	Ika	Swati
5	"I'm Survivor Rich"	April 6, 2022	Ika		Lydia (Vati)	Vati	Daniel
5	"I'm Survivor Rich"	April 6, 2022	Taku		Rockroy (Ika)	Vati	Daniel
6	"You Can't Hide on Survivor"	April 13, 2022	~~Hai, Jonathan, Lydia,~~; ~~Maryanne, Tori, [Lindsay]~~ (Note: The winners were allowed to save an extra player and invite that player to the reward; they chose Lindsay.) (Chanelle, Drea, Mike, Omar, Rocksroy, Romeo) (Note: Rocksroy was exiled after not being chosen to join the winning team's reward and share in their immunity. At Exile Island, he was given the opportunity to either keep the game moving as is, allowing the winning team to keep their immunity, or go back in time and change the outcome, in which case he and the losing team would be given immunity instead. His decision was to change the outcome and give immunity to the losing team, a move that occurred after the original winning team had enjoyed their reward.)		Rocksroy	None (Note: The episode ended on a cliffhanger and no one was voted out.)	
7	"The Devil You Do or The Devil You Don’t"	April 13, 2022	~~Hai, Jonathan, Lydia,~~; ~~Maryanne, Tori, [Lindsay]~~ (Chanelle, Drea, Mike, Omar, Rocksroy, Romeo)		Rocksroy	None	Lydia
7	"The Devil You Do or The Devil You Don’t"	April 13, 2022		Tori	Rocksroy	None	Lydia
8	"You Better Be Wearing a Seatbelt"	April 20, 2022	Chanelle, Jonathan, Mike, Rocksroy, Tori	Tori	None	Kula Kula	Chanelle
9	"Game of Chicken"	April 27, 2022	Jonathan [Drea, Lindsay, Maryanne, Tori] (Note: In addition to immunity, Jonathan won reward for his entire team for lasting the longest in the challenge.)	Hai	None	Kula Kula	Rocksroy
9	"Game of Chicken"	April 27, 2022	Jonathan [Drea, Lindsay, Maryanne, Tori]	Jonathan	None	Kula Kula	Tori
10	"Tell a Good Lie, Not a Stupid Lie"	May 4, 2022	Lindsay [Mike, Omar]	Lindsay	None	Kula Kula	Hai
11	"Battle Royale"	May 11, 2022	None	Jonathan [Lindsay] (Note: Lindsay lost the immunity challenge, and therefore had to play "Do or Die" at tribal council; she won, and was granted immunity.)	None	Kula Kula	Drea
12	"Caterpillar to a Butterfly"	May 18, 2022	Omar [Maryanne, Mike, Romeo]	Lindsay	None	Kula Kula	Omar
13	"It Comes Down to This"	May 25, 2022	Mike [Jonathan]	Mike	None	Kula Kula	Lindsay
13	"It Comes Down to This"	May 25, 2022	None	Romeo (Note: For winning the final Immunity Challenge, Romeo had to assign additional immunity to another player, with the remaining two competing in a fire-making challenge to determine the third finalist; he gave additional immunity to Maryanne.) [Maryanne]	None	Kula Kula	Jonathan

== Episodes ==
No. overall	No. in season	Title	Rating/share (18–49)	Original release date	U.S. viewers (millions)
610	1	"Feels Like a Rollercoaster"	0.8/7	March 9, 2022	4.96
Jeff welcomed the 18 new castaways before announcing their first reward challenge.: Reward Challenge: One member from each tribe raced into the jungle to untie two paddles. A second member then raced along the beach to retrieve the rest of the paddles, but each were met with a decision to either grab the paddles immediately, or untie 20 knots for individual advantages. Once all paddles were obtained, tribes rowed around a buoy before collecting bamboo sticks which would be used to retrieve a flint. The first tribe to get the flint won it plus a pot and a machete.; Daniel injured his shoulder but was cleared to continue after the challenge concluded. Drea, Hai, and Lindsay agreed on taking the secret advantage, and Taku’s large lead going into the final stage was squandered to Ika. Taku and Vati were met with a “savvy” or “sweat” task to complete in four hours to obtain basic supplies. Both chose “savvy” and successfully completed a puzzle in which they had to count how many triangles were within a large triangle. Drea, Hai, and Lindsay learned they each possessed an "advantage amulet," which gave the trio one extra vote among the three of them. If only two of those castaways remained in the game, the advantage would upgrade to a steal-a-vote. If only one of those castaways remained, the amulet would become a full idol. This advantage would be good until the Final Six. At Ika, two alliances of three (Drea-Rocksroy-Romeo and Swati-Tori-Zach) formed, but some tribemates were put off by Rocksroy’s method of leadership when building the shelter. Tori went off on her own to gather food for the tribe, but some saw this as her looking for an idol. At Vati, bonds between Jenny & Mike and Hai & Lydia led Chanelle to propose an alliance with Daniel. At Taku, Jackson opened up to his tribemates about being a transgender man. On Day Two, one representative from each tribe went to a summit: Maryanne from Taku, Jenny from Vati, and Drea from Ika bonded on their journey before deciding to risk or protect their vote. Jenny protected hers, while Drea and Maryanne risked, meaning they each received an extra vote. On the morning of Day Three, Jeff arrived at Taku to talk about Jackson's underlying medical condition which required the use of lithium, something about which Jackson did not tell production in advance. The worry of lithium withdrawal, which could have caused side effects, prompted his removal from the game.: Immunity Challenge: Tribes swam to a boat where they gathered three heavy chests floating in the water, which they pushed under nets after arriving on land. Two tribe members used puzzle pieces inside the chest to assemble a giant dragon puzzle. The first two tribes to solve their puzzle won, while the last-place tribe had to forfeit their flint.; Taku and Vati won the challenge. At Ika, Zach became a target due to faltering in the puzzle, but Romeo, whom Zach had bonded with, tried to sway votes onto Tori instead. At Tribal Council, Zach took his Shot in the Dark but was unsuccessful, and the rest of the tribe voted him out.
611	2	"Good and Guilty"	0.8/7	March 16, 2022	5.06
At Ika, Drea told Swati and Tori about her extra vote in an effort to establish a girls' alliance, but her growing power worried Swati, who tried to convince Tori to vote out Drea next. At Taku, Maryanne's youthful energy endeared herself to her tribemates but also sparked concern. Jonathan and Omar bonded, and the former was also tightly aligned with Lindsay. Marya opened up to the tribe about the death of her brother, a nurse, at the start of the COVID-19 crisis. At Vati, Hai struggled with eating a crab due to being a vegan. Mike searched for an idol and found the Beware idol seen in the previous season. He told Jenny and Daniel, but the latter talked to Chanelle about blindsiding Mike before the idol had a chance to get power.: Immunity/Reward Challenge: One tribe member directed two pairs of blindfolded tribemates to bags of puzzle pieces. Afterwards, they brought their four tribemates to a station to direct them in solving a puzzle. The first two tribes to finish won immunity; the first-place tribe won a large fishing kit, the second-place tribe won a smaller fishing kit, and the last-place tribe had to forfeit their flint.; Vati and Ika won the challenge. The alliance of Jonathan, Lindsay, and Omar debated voting out Marya or the more outgoing Maryanne, the latter of whom searched for an idol. At Tribal Council, everyone acknowledged a personal fondness for each other, but it was Marya who was sent home following a failed Shot in the Dark.
612	3	"Go for the Gusto"	0.8/7	March 23, 2022	5.35
Maryanne told her tribemates about her extra vote after Tribal Council before everyone searched for an idol the following morning. Maryanne found Taku's Beware idol in front of Omar and accepted it. At Vati, Daniel asked to see Mike's idol to get a better understanding of it, but he accidentally misplaced it, to Mike's frustration, though they found it soon afterwards. Chanelle and Daniel were in the middle between the two pairs of Jenny & Mike and Hai & Lydia.: Immunity/Reward Challenge: Tribe members swam to a marker in the ocean and dove down to retrieve a ladder, which they used to hoist another tribe member to a key, which they used to unlock sand bags when they arrived on land. The first two tribes to land five sand bags on floating platforms won immunity; the first-place tribe won tools and fruit, the second-place tribe won a smaller set of both tools and fruit, while the last-place tribe had to forfeit their flint.; Taku easily finished first largely due to Jonathan's efforts, while Vati and Ika struggled in the turbulent waters. Jeff halted the challenge, having the two tribes come to shore while production retrieved their keys in the water and continuing from that point. Ika barely beat Vati for second place. Taku was tasked to send one member from Vati and one from either their own tribe or Ika to the summit; they chose Chanelle and Omar. Though Chanelle expressed the importance of her vote to Omar, she decided to risk her vote, as did he. Jenny and Mike targeted Lydia, while Hai and Lydia targeted Jenny. Chanelle telling Daniel she risked her vote led to some scrambling before Tribal Council, during which Mike and Chanelle could not vote (due respectively to the Beware idol and to unsuccessfully risking the vote). Daniel voted against Lydia to force a 2–2 tie, which was deadlocked after neither Hai nor Daniel switched their vote. Daniel started the ensuing discussion by stating he did not want to go to rocks, leading Hai to declare he would not change his vote. After some arguments amongst the tribe, Daniel ultimately joined Hai in eliminating Jenny.
613	4	"Vibe of the Tribe"	0.9/8	March 30, 2022	5.63
Following Tribal Council, Chanelle told the tribe that Daniel was the one who told her that Mike had found an idol and lost his vote. Hai pulled Mike aside later that night and formed a three person alliance with himself, Mike and Lydia.: Reward Challenge: In groups of three, tribe members raced to untangle themselves from braided ropes, through and over various obstacles before using rings to hook and pull towards them a wooden sled. From the sled they collected balls and attempted to land all four into a vertical cage target. The first tribe to finish won ten fish.; Taku won reward by a landslide thanks to Jonathan's efforts. Other tribe members pointed out Jonathan's dominance in recent challenges. Back at camp, Maryanne and Omar voiced frustration with Jonathan's comment about their tribe being a "tight four". Jonathan noted that he could be a shield for others moving forward. At Ika, the tribe was irritated with Rocksroy's bossiness around camp. Due to Drea's extra vote, Swati approached Tori with a plan to bring in Rocksroy. Tori mentioned Drea's extra vote to Rocksroy, who relayed the conversation to Drea. Once it got back to Swati, she became frustrated with her ally for sharing too much information.: Immunity Challenge: Two members from each tribe were tethered to a boat, and hauled the remaining members in the boat through the water to a platform. Two other members leapt into the water attempting to grab keys, before entering the boat again and getting pulled to a floating platform, where they used the keys to unlock puzzle pieces and solve a hanging fish puzzle. The first two tribes to finish won immunity, while the losing tribe had to forfeit their flint.; Taku cruised to another easy victory, and Vati barely finished second over Ika. Rocksroy wanted to vote out Tori for being untrustworthy, but Swati's name came up after it was revealed that she had told each of her tribemates that they were her "number one." Upon learning the target had shifted from Tori to herself, Swati threw Tori under the bus to Drea, who wasn't sure whom to believe. At Tribal Council, Swati called out Tori for trying to blindside Drea, causing Tori to argue that Swati had tried to blindside Drea first (two episodes prior). After a failed Shot in the Dark, Swati was sent home, though Rocksroy had voted for Tori.
614	5	"I'm Survivor Rich"	0.9/8	April 6, 2022	5.58
Romeo explained to Rocksroy the tribe’s reason for targeting Swati, reassuring him they’re still tight, though Tori desired to jump ship. The next morning, Drea searched for, and found, Ika’s idol along with Romeo. At Taku, Maryanne and Lindsay’s endless talking annoyed Jonathan, who got into an argument with Maryanne. At Vati, Hai and Lydia believed Chanelle was more dangerous, but the tribe questioned whether Daniel’s shoulder injury was as severe as he claimed following a fishing trip. Mike remained reluctant to say his secret phrase and potentially put a target on his back, but all phrases were said at the challenge the next day, putting all three idols in power and giving the respective castaways their vote back.: Immunity/Reward Challenge: Tribes raced over a raised net obstacle before one member untangled a braided rope interlaced with a key via slide puzzle. The key unlocked a machete that gave them access to sandbags, which they used to slingshot two distant targets. The first two tribes to hit both targets won immunity as well as large and medium tarps respectively, while the last place tribe had to forfeit their flint.; Ika and Taku won immunity, with Jonathan making a comeback after Omar’s slow puzzle section. Lydia and Rocksroy were selected for the summit; they purposefully withheld information about their tribes, causing both players to protect their vote. Chanelle and Daniel each pled their case to their tribemates, while Hai, Lydia, and Mike planned to split the vote in case a Shot in the Dark was played. At Tribal Council, Chanelle voted against Mike, and the vote was tied at two apiece between her and Daniel; on the re-vote, Daniel was unanimously sent home, though Mike was unhappy about the stray vote against him.
615	6	"You Can't Hide on Survivor"	0.8/7	April 13, 2022	5.12
Mike's trust in Chanelle diminished upon learning she was the one who voted against him, while at Ika, Tori annoyed Rocksroy with questions about his summit trip. Drea and Romeo, listening in on the conversation from camp, felt wary of trusting Tori moving forward. When the tribes met on Day 12, Jeff announced they were in the individual stage of the game, though they weren't yet merged.: Immunity/Reward Challenge: Divided into two teams of five by random draw, team members raced to unearth a large boulder before navigating it through a series of obstacles, standing on it when necessary to grab keys, which they used after they scaled to a top of a tower to unlock puzzle pieces and assemble a 75-piece Survivor 42 logo puzzle. The first team to complete the puzzle won immunity at the next Tribal Council, the new merged tribe buffs and an Applebee's feast reward.; Lindsay and Rocksroy drew the odd rocks, and the team of Hai, Jonathan, Maryanne, Lydia, and Tori won reward; they selected Lindsay to join them, exiling Rocksroy. The other five (Chanelle, Drea, Mike, Omar, and Romeo) were left at Vati's beach while the winning team feasted. Drea and Mike agreed to look out for each other. When the challenge winners got back to the Vati camp, many new friendships were formed, and the tribe (except for Chanelle and Tori) agreed to align against the two of them.
616	7	"The Devil You Do or The Devil You Don't"	0.8/7	April 13, 2022	5.12
On Exile Island, Rocksroy was met by Jeff, who offered him to either leave things as is or smash an hourglass to reverse the outcome of the previous challenge, giving himself and the losing team immunity. Rocksroy chose to smash the hourglass.: Immunity Challenge: The non-immune castaways held a rope to balance a wobbly table while stacking blocks spelling the word "immunity"; if any blocks fell, that castaway would have to restack them. The first to correctly stack all eight blocks and stand on the starting platform won immunity, while the remaining five non-immune castaways would be vulnerable at the last pre merge Tribal Council.; Tori won immunity, thwarting the plans of the majority. With Chanelle and Tori both safe, the tribe scrambled to come up with a new plan. Romeo and Lydia sought to vote out a big physical threat in Jonathan while he was unsafe, but Hai wanted to keep Jonathan as a shield. Maryanne's name was thrown out by Jonathan to give the perception that Taku wasn't a tight four, but Omar (without a vote due to his summit visit) tried to convince tribemates to blindside Lydia to keep his closer allies in the game. The vote at Tribal Council revealed he was able to accomplish this; no advantages were played, and Lydia was voted out. Afterwards, Jeff told the remaining 11 castaways that they were officially merged.
617	8	"You Better Be Wearing a Seatbelt"	0.9/8	April 20, 2022	5.43
At the new merged tribe, Kula Kula (a name suggested by Omar), Romeo grew paranoid about his spot in the game after being in the minority, while Maryanne's insecurity manifested despite her Taku tribemates telling her they still had her back. The following morning, Mike and Omar bonded.: Reward Challenge: Divided randomly into two groups of five (with one castaway having no chance at reward), team members took turns jumping off a platform into the water before guiding a buoy on a rope through various obstacles and onto a platform. When all buoys were collected groups attempted to land all five into a floating basket target. The first team to finish won peanut butter and jelly sandwiches and potato chips.; Maryanne drew the odd rock, but Drea offered to sit out in her place. The team of Chanelle, Jonathan, Mike, Rocksroy, and Tori won reward, and Drea found a Beware advantage at the sit-out bench (her fourth total advantage). She found it was the "Knowledge is Power" advantage, which allowed her to ask any castaway if they had an idol or advantage, and if they did, they would have to give it to her. Omar told the majority alliance as well as the outsiders he was with them, putting himself in the middle.: Immunity Challenge: Castaways held a buoy by supporting it with two rods on a narrow platform. If the buoy fell or the castaway stepped off the perch, they would be eliminated from the challenge. The last standing castaway won immunity.; Before the challenge, Jeff negotiated with the tribe for four days worth of rice in exchange for some castaways sitting out of the challenge. They eventually agreed on four castaways (Drea, Lindsay, Maryanne, and Omar), and Tori won her second individual immunity. The vote came down to Chanelle or Romeo; Hai pushed for Romeo due to his paranoia leading him to consult several tribemates, but Mike lobbied to oust Chanelle. At Tribal Council, Tori joined the majority under Mike's lead to send Chanelle to the jury.
618	9	"Game of Chicken"	0.9/8	April 27, 2022	5.72
Hai confronted Romeo about the stray vote he received at the last Tribal Council. Romeo denied casting the vote, but privately said he wanted to make Hai paranoid. Rocksroy approached Mike and Jonathan about forming an all-male alliance, which they agreed to; however, Omar and Hai did not appear receptive to the idea.: Immunity/Reward Challenge: Castaways, divided into two teams of five by random draw, balanced on floating A-frames, moving up onto narrower footholds after regular intervals. If a castaway fell off the platform or touched the structure they would be eliminated from the challenge. The longest lasting castaway from each group won immunity, while the longest lasting castaway overall won vegetables and beef kebabs for their team, along with the advantage of going to Tribal Council second.; Hai and Jonathan won immunity, with Jonathan also winning reward for his team, and Hai's team being exiled to Taku's camp. On one team, the tribe initially agreed to vote out Romeo, but Omar approached Hai and Mike about voting for Rocksroy as he would be harder to get rid of later in the game. On the other team, Jonathan hatched a plan to vote out Drea by using Maryanne as a decoy vote, but Maryanne and Lindsay were put off by his aggressive scheming and Tori tipped off Drea that she would be the true target. At the first Tribal Council, Rocksroy was voted out unanimously. Upon seeing this at the second Tribal, Drea and Maryanne expressed discomfort about the first two jurors being Black and refused to vote for one another, playing their idols before the votes were even cast. Jonathan, Maryanne and Drea chose to express their votes aloud for Tori or Lindsay rather than use private ballots. Tori played her Shot in the Dark, which failed, and she became the third member of the jury.
619	10	"Tell a Good Lie, Not a Stupid Lie"	0.9/8	May 4, 2022	5.62
Though he had joined in the vote against Rocksroy, an upset Mike confided to Omar that he felt Hai had controlled that vote. Lindsay told Omar about Jonathan's brash strategizing, and they considered severing ties with him. They searched for a new idol; Lindsay was in the right location and failed to spot the idol, but Maryanne retrieved it later.: Reward Challenge: Castaways swam ashore and traversed a wooden obstacle before collecting a sandbag and balancing it on a pedestal, then crossing a seesaw, before attempting to land it on a small platform. The first castaway to finish won an overnight stay at a sanctuary with a feast.; Lindsay won and selected Omar and Mike to join her. While on reward, they were surprised with videos from their loved ones at home. Omar told Mike a lie that Hai considered Mike his puppet, angering Mike.: Immunity Challenge: Castaways stood on a narrow beam while balancing a ball on a wooden bow. At regular intervals they would move down to a narrower section of the perch, making it harder to balance. If a castaway dropped their ball or stepped down from the platform they would be eliminated. The last standing castaway won immunity.; Lindsay won immunity. The vote came down to strategic threat Hai or physical threat Jonathan. Hai tried to convince Jonathan he had an idol (really a fake) he would play for him; Jonathan pretended to fall for it but told Omar he didn't trust Hai. Omar debated which of the two was the bigger threat to him, but at Tribal Council, Romeo was the only one left out of the vote as Hai was sent to the jury. With that vote, Drea and Lindsay's amulet advantage became one steal-a-vote between the two of them.
620	11	"Battle Royale"	0.8/7	May 11, 2022	5.38
Players discussed tribe dynamics now that Hai was gone, with Romeo and Maryanne perceived to be at the bottom of the seven. The other players made a Top 5 pact, but Mike secretly wanted to target Drea as she was too powerful with all of her advantages. Jonathan also started to get on people’s nerves as his hunger made him unpleasant to be around, and Lindsay convinced others to target him if he failed to win immunity at the next challenge.: Immunity Challenge: Castaways stood on a narrow perch with their hands on the back of an overhead bar behind them. The last one left standing won immunity. The first person to fall out of the challenge would be forced to participate in a game of chance called Do or Die, which could eliminate them from the game without voting. Castaways could opt out of the challenge and be safe from Do or Die, but would not be immune from the potential vote.; Jonathan and Lindsay opted to compete while everyone else sat out, and Jonathan won immunity. Lindsay decided to join Mike in targeting Drea because Lindsay’s amulet would become a full idol if Drea were voted out. However, Omar began to feel concerned about Mike’s control in the game and considered targeting him. Drea told Omar about her Knowledge is Power advantage and planned to use it against Mike that night. At Tribal Council, Lindsay survived the Do or Die game. Drea used her Knowledge is Power advantage to ask Mike if he had an idol, but Mike said no, having been tipped off by Omar earlier and given him his idol to hold. Drea used her extra vote on Mike, but everyone else besides Romeo voted for her, sending her to the jury. Lindsay's amulet thus matured into an immunity idol as the only one remaining in the game.
621	12	"Caterpillar to a Butterfly"	0.9/8	May 18, 2022	5.70
Omar returned Mike’s idol to him and they reaffirmed their desire to work with one another, but Mike suspected Omar would come after him next and began rallying others against Omar. Meanwhile, Lindsay continued targeting Jonathan and reaffirmed her desire to beat him in the next immunity challenge. Jonathan felt suspicious of his old Taku allies and knew it would soon be time for them to turn on one another.: Reward Challenge: Castaways unspooled themselves from a rope wheel before traversing a mesh net and a balance beam, collecting a key along the way. They then used the key to unlock puzzle pieces, which they used to assemble a stacked block puzzle. First to finish won their choice of two rewards back at camp: chicken and vegetables or chocolate chip cookies and cake.; Omar won reward, and Jeff informed him that he could share the chicken and veggies with two people or the cookies and cake with three people; he chose to share the latter with Romeo, Maryanne and Mike. Jonathan and Lindsay discussed the upcoming vote and the plan to vote out Mike, but secretly they wanted to vote each other out. Mike told Maryanne about Lindsay’s idol, which made Maryanne believe that she couldn’t trust Lindsay as much as she thought.: Immunity Challenge: Castaways raced through an obstacle course and over a bridge containing puzzle planks, which they untied and used to assemble a staircase puzzle. They then maneuvered a bag of balls up a pole, before rolling them through a table maze and landing both into separate holes. First to complete the maze won immunity.; Lindsay won immunity. Her plan was to vote out Jonathan, but Maryanne felt more threatened by Omar and approached Mike about voting him out instead. Mike believed that Lindsay would use her amulet to save Omar and that Romeo was thus the safer vote, but Lindsay secretly wanted to save her idol to prevent it from re-entering circulation. Maryanne hatched a plan to split the votes between Omar and Romeo, using her extra vote to get out Omar. At Tribal Council, Lindsay declined to play her amulet, and Jonathan and Romeo each received two votes, but Romeo plus Maryanne’s double vote blindsided Omar, sending him to the jury.
622	13	"It Comes Down to This"	0.8/7	May 25, 2022	5.11
The final five castaways were taken to a new island to start over with nothing. The next morning, they each received a word scramble puzzle, giving a clue to the location of a secret advantage. Lindsay solved the puzzle first and found the advantage, which gave her an advantage in the next immunity challenge.: Immunity/Reward Challenge: Castaways raced through an obstacle course to six separate stations containing bags of puzzle pieces, then freed the bags of knots before completing a circular puzzle. First to complete the puzzle won immunity, as well as a reward of pasta and garlic bread to be shared with one other person.; Despite Lindsay’s advantage giving her fewer knots to untie, she lost immunity to Mike by one puzzle piece. Mike shared his reward with Jonathan, and they discussed voting out Lindsay next. Lindsay pleaded with Mike to save her, reminding him of the promises he’d made to her previously. Maryanne also reminded Mike of his promise to play his idol for her, and she considered using her own idol to save Lindsay. At Tribal Council, Mike played his idol for Maryanne, who neglected to play her own, and Lindsay was sent to the jury.: Immunity Challenge: Castaways, with one hand tied behind their back, dropped a ball into a metal chute, which traveled down a spiraling metal track. A turnstile gate in the middle of the track rotated with every ball, causing the ball to alternate exiting out of the two exits. Castaways must catch the ball and drop it back into the chute at the top. Every few minutes, an additional ball was added to the track until up to seven balls were active on the track. If a ball exited the track and was not caught, the castaway was eliminated; the last one remaining won immunity.; Romeo outlasted Jonathan to win immunity. Mike told Romeo that he had no hard feelings about being forced to make fire, and strategized with him about whether to take Jonathan or Maryanne. Romeo elected to take Maryanne with him to final 3, and Mike faced Jonathan in the fire making challenge.: Fire Making Challenge: Mike was the first to get flame. Using a lot of husk to keep it going he started piling sticks on. Jonathan finally got a flame going but Mikes flame was already licking the rope. Mike beat Jonathan in the fire making challenge, sending Jonathan to the jury.; At the Final Tribal Council, the three finalists highlighted their different paths to the end: Mike making strong social bonds and flashy strategic moves, Maryanne managing her threat level and keeping her options open, and Romeo fighting to stay alive from the bottom. Mike was criticized for breaking his word to several players, Romeo was criticized for being paranoid and flighty, while Maryanne was criticized for being overly emotional and putting herself in danger. However, after Maryanne highlighted her growth in the game and her strong under-the-radar moves such as finding the secret merge idol, the jury voted in her favor 7–1–0 over Mike and Romeo, awarding her the $1 million and the title of Sole Survivor. After the votes were read, castaways enjoyed champagne and pizza while discussing the game with Jeff in a Survivor after-show.

== Voting history ==
Survivor 42 voting history
	Original tribes									No tribes	Merged tribe									
Episode	1		2	3			4	5		6/7	8	9		10	11		12		13	
Day	3		5	7			9	11		14	16	17 (Note: On Day 17, a split Tribal Council was held. The castaways were divided into two groups of five; each group went to Tribal Council separately to eliminate one castaway from each.)		19	21		23		24	25
Tribe	Taku	Ika	Taku	Vati			Ika	Vati		None	Kula Kula	Kula Kula	Kula Kula	Kula Kula	Kula Kula		Kula Kula		Kula Kula	Kula Kula
Eliminated	Jackson	Zach	Marya	Tie (Note: The vote resulted in a tie. Per the rules, a second vote was held where the castaways involved in the tie would not vote and the remaining castaways could only vote for those who tied.)	Tie (Note: After two rounds of voting, Tribal Council remained tied. Per the rules, the non-tied castaways who had the ability to vote must come to a consensus as to whom to eliminate between the tied castaways, or else the tied castaways would then become immune and one of the remaining players would be eliminated by random draw.)	Jenny	Swati	Tie	Daniel	Lydia	Chanelle	Rocksroy	Tori	Hai	Drea		Omar		Lindsay	Jonathan
Votes	Removed (Note: No vote; Jackson was removed from the game for medical reasons.)	5–0	4–0	2–2	1–1	Consensus (Note: Due to a deadlocked tie, the non-tied castaways who had the ability to vote, Daniel and Hai, had to come to a unanimous decision to vote out either Jenny or Lydia, or else Jenny and Lydia would become immune and one of the remaining castaways would be eliminated by random draw. Daniel and Hai decided to eliminate Jenny.)	3–1	2–2–1	3–0	6–2–2–1	7–3–1	4–1	4–0 (Note: Drea and Maryanne both played a hidden immunity idol on themselves before the votes would have been cast. Then Drea, Jonathan, and Maryanne all publicly agreed to vote for Tori, and Lindsay was required to vote for Tori as the only other non-immune castaway remaining at Tribal. This prompted Tori to publicly play her shot in the dark. Because of this, no formal vote was held.)	6–2	5–3		3–2–2		4–1	None (Note: For winning the final Immunity Challenge, Romeo had to assign additional immunity to another castaway, with the remaining two competing in a fire-making challenge to determine the third finalist; he gave additional immunity to Maryanne, and Mike defeated Jonathan in the fire-making challenge.)
Voter	Vote																			Challenge
Maryanne			Marya							Lydia	Romeo		Tori	Hai	Drea		Omar	Omar (Note: This player used an extra vote advantage, allowing them to cast two ballots during a single vote.)	Lindsay	Saved
Mike				None (Note: This player lost a vote attempting to gain an advantage.)				Chanelle	Daniel	Lydia	Chanelle	Rocksroy		Hai	Drea		Romeo		Lindsay	Won
Romeo		Zach					Swati			Maryanne	Hai	Rocksroy		Jonathan	Mike		Omar		Lindsay	Immune
Jonathan			Marya							Lydia	Chanelle		Tori	Hai	Drea		Romeo		Lindsay	Lost
Lindsay			Marya							Lydia	Chanelle		Tori	Hai	Drea		Jonathan		Jonathan	
Omar			Marya							None	Romeo	Rocksroy		Hai	Drea		Jonathan			
Drea		Zach					Swati			Lydia	Chanelle		Tori	Hai	Mike	Mike				
Hai				Jenny	Jenny	Jenny		Daniel	Daniel	Lydia	Chanelle	Rocksroy		Jonathan						
Tori		Zach					Swati			Jonathan	Chanelle		None (Note: This player played the Shot in the Dark, and as a result, had to sacrifice that night's vote.)							
Rocksroy		Zach					Tori			Lindsay	Chanelle	Romeo								
Chanelle				None				Mike	None (Note: This player was not eligible to vote in the second round of voting.)	Jonathan	Romeo									
Lydia				Jenny	None			Daniel	Daniel	Maryanne										
Daniel				Lydia	Lydia	Jenny		Chanelle	None											
Swati		Zach					None													
Jenny				Lydia	None															
Marya			None																	
Zach		None																		
Jackson	Removed																			

Jury vote
Episode	13		
Day	26		
Finalist	Maryanne	Mike	Romeo
Votes	7–1–0		
Juror	Vote		
Jonathan		Yes	
Lindsay	Yes		
Omar	Yes		
Drea	Yes		
Hai	Yes		
Tori	Yes		
Rocksroy	Yes		
Chanelle	Yes		

== Production ==
=== Development ===
Much like the previous season, it is a shortened season spanning only 26 out of the usual 39 days, due to the COVID-19 pandemic requiring all cast and production members to quarantine for 14 days and taking up some of the short production time.

=== Filming ===
Both the 41st and 42nd season of Survivor were originally ordered in May 2020. Production and broadcast of the season were impacted by the COVID-19 pandemic. Filming occurred in Fiji for the tenth consecutive season during May and June 2021.

=== Gameplay ===
This season reused several twists introduced in the previous season. Returning twists included the "Shot In the Dark," the "Beware Advantage," and various decision games which forced players to make game-altering choices. New to this season was the "Advantage Amulet" which was initially shared by three players at the start of the game; the fewer of its owners remained in the game, the more power it gained.

== Reception ==
Survivor 42 received mainly positive reviews with praise directed towards the cast, editing, and the eventual winner. However, the season received some criticism for repeating many of the twists and challenges from Survivor 41. Dalton Ross of Entertainment Weekly ranked this season 20th out of 42. He stated that "the entire season often felt like a rerun" due to the repetition of the format used in the previous season. However, he praised the producers and editing direction for having more focus on the players rather than the twists and called Maryanne's victory the best story of the season. Jake Cole of Slant Magazine ranked the season 8th out of 42, praising the cast, editing, gameplay, and the winner's "masterclass" Final Tribal Council performance. Gordon Holmes of Xfinity said that "For better or for worse, seasons 41 and 42 are going to be linked together forever. They're basically an identical format with different casts. And 41 was fine while 42 was great." Andy Dehnart of reality blurred called Survivor 42 an improvement over the previous season due to "a clearer, stronger story arc that spans at least half the season, if not more." In 2024, Nick Caruso of TVLine ranked this season 24th out of 47.

== Viewing figures ==
=== United States ===
Viewership and ratings per episode of Survivor 42
No.	Title	Air date	Rating/share (18–49)	Viewers (millions)	DVR (18–49)	DVR viewers (millions)	Total (18–49)	Total viewers (millions)	Ref.
1	"Feels Like A Rollercoaster"	March 9, 2022	0.8/7	4.96	0.5	2.18	1.3	7.14	
2	"Good and Guilty"	March 16, 2022	0.8/7	5.06	0.4	1.79	1.2	6.85	
3	"Go for the Gusto"	March 23, 2022	0.8/7	5.35	0.4	1.78	1.2	7.14	
4	"Vibe of the Tribe"	March 30, 2022	0.9/8	5.63	0.4	1.88	1.3	7.46	
5	"I'm Survivor Rich"	April 6, 2022	0.9/8	5.58	0.3	1.72	1.2	7.31	
6–7	"You Can't Hide on Survivor/The Devil You Do or The Devil You Don't"	April 13, 2022	0.8/7	5.12	0.4	1.97	1.2	7.03	
8	"You Better Be Wearing a Seatbelt"	April 20, 2022	0.9/8	5.43	0.3	1.90	1.2	7.33	
9	"Game of Chicken"	April 27, 2022	0.9/8	5.72	0.4	1.70	1.3	7.41	
10	"Tell a Good Lie, Not a Stupid One"	May 4, 2022	0.9/8	5.62	TBD	TBD	TBD	7.02	
11	"Battle Royale"	May 11, 2022	0.8/7	5.37	TBD	TBD	TBD	7.20	
12	"Cattepillar to a Butterfly"	May 18, 2022	0.9/8	5.70	TBD	TBD	TBD	7.41	
13	"It Comes Down to This"	May 25, 2022	0.8/7	5.11	TBD	TBD	TBD	TBD	
