= Maryanne Oketch =

Canadian reality television participant

- Born: January 1, 1998 (age 28); Karlsruhe, Germany
- Citizenship: Canadian
- Education: McMaster University
- Known for: Survivor 42 (winner)

Maryanne Oketch (born January 1, 1998) is a Canadian television personality who is known for being the winner of the 42nd season of the American reality TV competition series Survivor. In doing so, Oketch became the second Black woman to win the competition series, following Vecepia Towery. She is also the second Canadian winner of the series, following the previous season's winner, Erika Casupanan.

== Biography ==
Oketch was born on January 1, 1998, in Karlsruhe, Germany. Her parents, who are originally from Kenya, immigrated to Canada when she was a child, where they first lived in London, Ontario. She attended McMaster University in Hamilton, Ontario, graduating in 2020 with a Bachelor's degree in Integrated Science. She also holds a Master's degree from Tyndale University in Toronto, Ontario. She served as a children's ministry coordinator for a Pentecostal church east of Toronto, before enrolling in medical school at Western University in 2024. That year, she also married her fiancé Konner Howell, a Survivor fan.

== Survivor ==
In 2021, Oketch was living in Ajax, Ontario when she got called to participate in the 42nd season of the reality competition series Survivor. The 42nd season of Survivor aired on Global and CBS from March–May 2022.

At the start of the game, Oketch was placed on the Taku tribe. On Day 2, she and two other castaways, Drea Wheeler and Jenny Kim, were each forced to make an individual decision to either risk or protect her next Tribal Council vote, similar to a game of chicken. Those that protected their votes would neither gain nor lose anything, while those that risked their votes would each gain an extra vote, unless all three players risked it, in which case every player would lose her vote at her next Tribal Council. Oketch and Wheeler each selected "risk" while Kim selected "protect," giving Oketch and Wheeler an extra vote each.

On Day 6, Oketch found one of three Beware Idols, which could only be given power through an activation phrase that had to be uttered at the same time as the other two Beware Idols' activation phrases. By Day 11, she and the other two finders of Beware Idols were finally able to activate their idols, as they had all been found. On Night 14, Oketch received two votes at Tribal Council, but Lydia Meredith was sent home with six votes, meaning that Oketch would make it to the merge.

Having received votes at the final pre-merge Tribal Council, Oketch began to feel insecure about her place on the merge tribe. On Day 17, Wheeler was the intended target for elimination at Tribal Council, but she announced that she had an idol which she would be playing for herself. This prompted Oketch to also play her own idol to protect herself that night. The next day, Oketch found another idol, which she managed to keep a secret from the remaining players for the duration of the game.

On Day 23, Jonathan Young was targeted for being a constant threat to win challenges, but Romeo Escobar was also targeted that night. Oketch, however, decided to team up with Escobar in blindsiding Omar Zaheer, and she used her extra vote to tip the results in her favor, eliminating Zaheer by a vote of 3–2–2. Two days later, Escobar won the final immunity challenge and decided to force Mike Turner and Young to compete in a fire-making challenge to determine who would be eliminated right before the Final Three. Escobar's decision effectively gave Oketch a bye into the Finals.

At the Final Tribal Council, Oketch told the jury about her gameplay, showing them the second immunity idol she had found and managed to keep a secret from the rest of the tribe. She also explained her strategy behind eliminating Zaheer at the Final Six, stating that everyone else left in the game at that point would have taken her to the end no matter who won the final immunity challenge. When the final vote took place, Oketch was crowned Sole Survivor by a vote of 7–1–0. She received the vote of everyone on the jury except Young, who voted for Turner to win.

Her open discussion of the role of race in the game has been noted as one of the series' most significant moments over its 25 year history.

Preceded by Erika Casupanan	Winner of Survivor; Survivor 42	Succeeded by Mike Gabler
