= Survivor (American TV series) =

American reality television series

- Genre: Reality competition
- Created by: Charlie Parsons
- Based on: Expedition Robinson by Charlie Parsons
- Presented by: Jeff Probst
- Starring: Survivor contestants
- Theme music composer: Russ Landau
- Composer: David Vanacore
- Country of origin: United States
- Original language: English
- No. of seasons: 51
- No. of episodes: 735 (list of episodes)

Production
- Executive producers: Mark Burnett; Charlie Parsons; Jeff Probst
- Production location: See below
- Running time: 43 minutes (seasons 1–44); 64 minutes (season 45–present)
- Production companies: CBS EYE Productions; Survivor Productions LLC; CBS Studios; Castaway Television Productions; Mark Burnett Productions (2000–2011); One Three Media (2012–2014); United Artists Media Group (2014–2015); MGM Television (2016–present)

Original release
- Network: CBS
- Release: May 31, 2000 – present

Related
- Expedition Robinson; International versions

Survivor is the American version of the international Survivor reality competition television franchise, itself derived from the Swedish television series Expedition Robinson created by Charlie Parsons which premiered in 1997. The American series premiered on May 31, 2000, on CBS. It is hosted by Jeff Probst, who is also an executive producer along with Mark Burnett and Parsons.

Survivor places a group of people in an isolated location, where they must provide food, fire, and shelter for themselves. The contestants compete in challenges which include tests of their physical and mental abilities for rewards and immunity from elimination. The contestants are eliminated progressively from the game as they are voted out by their fellow contestants until only two or three remain. At that point, the contestants who were eliminated vote for the winner. They are given the title of "Sole Survivor" and are awarded the grand prize of $1,000,000.

The American version has been highly successful. From the 2000–01 through the 2005–06 television seasons, its first 11 seasons (competitions) rated among the top 10 most-watched shows. It is commonly considered the leader of American reality television because it was the first highly rated and profitable reality show on broadcast television in the United States, and is considered one of the best shows of the 2000s. The series has been nominated for 63 Emmy Awards, winning for Outstanding Sound Mixing in 2001, Outstanding Special Class Program in 2002, and was subsequently nominated four times for Outstanding Reality Competition Program when the category was introduced in 2003. Probst won the award for Outstanding Host for a Reality or Reality Competition Program four consecutive times after the award was introduced in 2008. In 2007, the series was included in Time magazine's list of the 100 greatest TV shows of all time. In 2013, TV Guide ranked it at No. 39 on its list of the "60 Best Series of All Time".

On January 22, 2026, ahead of the season 50 premiere, the show was renewed for a 51st and 52nd season. The 51st season premiered on September 23, 2026.

== Format and rules ==
The first American season of Survivor followed the same general format as the Swedish series Robinson. Sixteen or more players, split between two or more "tribes", are taken to a remote isolated location (usually in a tropical climate) and are forced to live off the land with meager supplies for 39 days (42 in The Australian Outback, 26 in post-COVID seasons). (Note: It also includes "Day Zero" in Survivor: Blood vs. Water and Survivor: San Juan del Sur, which pairs of family members or friends spent a night on the beach together before forming into tribes.) Frequent physical and mental challenges are used to pit the teams against each other for rewards, such as food or luxuries, or for "immunity", forcing the other tribe to attend "Tribal Council", where they must vote off one of their tribemates.

Signaling the halfway point in the game, survivors from both tribes come together to live as one, making it to the "merge". At this point, survivors will compete against each other to win individual immunity; winning immunity prevents that player from being voted out at Tribal Council. Most players that are voted out after the merge form the game's "jury". Once the group gets down to two or three people, a Final Tribal Council is held where the remaining players plead their case to the jury members. The jury then votes for which player should be considered the "Sole Survivor" and win the show's grand prize. In most seasons for the American version the grand prize is $1 million in addition to the Sole Survivor title; the grand prize was set at $2 million for the all-winner edition, Winners at War. From In the Hands of the Fans, a game advantage was introduced to potentially include a jackpoting element to the grand prize. This resulted in a $2 million prize during In the Hands of the Fans. Some seasons (particularly earlier seasons) have included additional prizes offered during the game, such as a car, as well as fan-favorite prizes awarded at the finale. All contestants are paid on a sliding scale based on the order they were voted out: the first player voted out has been given US$2,500 and the amount increases from there. Some of the seasons that have featured returning players have increased these amounts: Survivor: All-Stars featured payouts starting at US$5,000, while Winners at War had a minimum US$25,000 payout. All players are offered US$10,000 for participating in the finale show.

In addition to being eliminated by a Tribal Council Vote, the Castaways can also elect to leave the game at any time, either if they are finding the game or the experience too difficult, or to attend to a personal emergency outside of the game. Castaways who are injured can be removed from the game if the medical staff assess their condition and decides that they are not fit to continue in the game.

The American version has introduced numerous modifications, or "twists", on the core rules in order to engage players further and to prevent them from relying on strategies that succeeded in prior seasons. These changes have included tribal switches, seasons starting with more than two tribes, the ability to exile a player from a tribe for a short time on "Exile Island", hidden immunity idols that players can use to save themselves or others at Tribal Council, and special voting powers which can be used to influence the result at Tribal Council. Contestants can also compete for the chance to return to regular gameplay after elimination through "Redemption Island", "Edge of Extinction" or "The Outcast Tribe" twists. Players can also earn special advantages, including an extra vote, the ability to steal a vote, an idol nullifier, and a final four fire-making challenge as of season 35.

== Series overview ==
The United States version is produced by Mark Burnett and hosted by Jeff Probst, who also serves as an executive producer. Its creator Charlie Parsons is also an executive producer. Each competition is called a season, has a unique name, and lasts from 13 to 16 episodes. The first season, Survivor: Borneo, was broadcast as a summer replacement show in 2000. Starting with the third season, Survivor: Africa, there have been two seasons aired during each American television season. (Note: Except 2020–21, which was not aired due to the television production suspensions caused by the COVID-19 pandemic.) Starting with the 41st season, no subtitle has been used in promotion of the season.

In the first season, there was a 75-person crew. By season 22, the crew had grown to 325 people.

A total of 772 contestants have competed on Survivor's 51 seasons.

Season	Subtitle	Location	Original Tribes	Grand Prize	Episodes	Originally released		Winner	Runner(s)–up	2nd Runner-up	Final vote
Season	Subtitle	Location	Original Tribes	Grand Prize	Episodes	First released	Last released	Winner	Runner(s)–up	2nd Runner-up	Final vote
1	Borneo	Pulau Tiga, Sabah, Malaysia	Two tribes of eight new players	$1,000,000 (Note: For Borneo–Panama and In the Hands of the Fans, the winner also received a car as part of the grand prize.)	14	May 31, 2000	August 23, 2000	Richard Hatch	Kelly Wiglesworth	—N/a	4–3
2	The Australian Outback	Herbert River at Goshen Station, Queensland, Australia	Two tribes of eight new players	$1,000,000	16	January 28, 2001	May 3, 2001	Tina Wesson	Colby Donaldson	—N/a	4–3
3	Africa	Shaba National Reserve, Kenya	Two tribes of eight new players	$1,000,000	15	October 11, 2001	January 10, 2002	Ethan Zohn	Kim Johnson	—N/a	5–2
4	Marquesas	Nuku Hiva, Marquesas Islands, French Polynesia	Two tribes of eight new players	$1,000,000	15	February 28, 2002	May 19, 2002	Vecepia Towery	Neleh Dennis	—N/a	4–3
5	Thailand	Ko Tarutao, Satun Province, Thailand	Two tribes of eight new players; picked by the two oldest players	$1,000,000	15	September 19, 2002	December 19, 2002	Brian Heidik	Clay Jordan	—N/a	4–3
6	The Amazon	Rio Negro, Amazonas, Brazil	Two tribes of eight new players divided by gender	$1,000,000	15	February 13, 2003	May 11, 2003	Jenna Morasca	Matthew Von Ertfelda	—N/a	6–1
7	Pearl Islands	Pearl Islands, Panama	Two tribes of eight new players	$1,000,000	15	September 18, 2003	December 14, 2003	Sandra Diaz-Twine	Lillian Morris	—N/a	6–1
8	All-Stars	Pearl Islands, Panama	Three tribes of six returning players	$1,000,000	17	February 1, 2004	May 9, 2004	Amber Brkich	Rob Mariano	—N/a	4–3
9	Vanuatu	Efate, Shefa, Vanuatu	Two tribes of nine new players divided by gender	$1,000,000	15	September 16, 2004	December 12, 2004	Chris Daugherty	Twila Tanner	—N/a	5–2
10	Palau	Koror, Palau	A schoolyard pick of two tribes of nine new players each; two eliminated without a tribe	$1,000,000	15	February 17, 2005	May 15, 2005	Tom Westman	Katie Gallagher	—N/a	6–1
11	Guatemala	Petén, Guatemala	Two tribes of nine, including two returning players	$1,000,000	15	September 15, 2005	December 11, 2005	Danni Boatwright	Stephenie LaGrossa	—N/a	6–1
12	Panama	Pearl Islands, Panama	Four tribes of four new players divided by age and gender	$1,000,000	16	February 2, 2006	May 14, 2006	Aras Baskauskas	Danielle DiLorenzo	—N/a	5–2
13	Cook Islands	Aitutaki, Cook Islands	Four tribes of five new players divided by ethnicity: African Americans, Whites, Hispanics, and Asians	$1,000,000	16	September 14, 2006	December 17, 2006	Yul Kwon	Ozzy Lusth	Becky Lee	5–4–0
14	Fiji	Macuata, Vanua Levu, Fiji	Two tribes of nine new players divided by one selected castaway, who would replace the first person voted out	$1,000,000	15	February 8, 2007	May 13, 2007	Earl Cole	Cassandra Franklin & Andria "Dreamz" Herd	—N/a	9–0–0
15	China	Zhelin, Jiujiang, Jiangxi, China	Two tribes of eight new players	$1,000,000	15	September 20, 2007	December 16, 2007	Todd Herzog	Courtney Yates	Amanda Kimmel	4–2–1
16	Micronesia	Koror, Palau	Two tribes of ten: new players against past contestants	$1,000,000	15	February 7, 2008	May 11, 2008	Parvati Shallow	Amanda Kimmel	—N/a	5–3
17	Gabon	Estuaire, Gabon	A schoolyard pick of two tribes of nine new players, starting with the oldest players	$1,000,000	14	September 25, 2008	December 14, 2008	Robert "Bob" Crowley	Susie Smith	Jessica "Sugar" Kiper	4–3–0
18	Tocantins	Jalapão, Tocantins, Brazil	Two tribes of eight new players	$1,000,000	15	February 12, 2009	May 17, 2009	James "J.T." Thomas Jr.	Stephen Fishbach	—N/a	7–0
19	Samoa	Upolu, Samoa	Two tribes of ten new players	$1,000,000	16	September 17, 2009	December 20, 2009	Natalie White	Russell Hantz	Mick Trimming	7–2–0
20	Heroes vs. Villains	Upolu, Samoa	Two tribes of ten returning players divided by reputation: "heroes" vs. "villains"	$1,000,000	15	February 11, 2010	May 16, 2010	Sandra Diaz-Twine	Parvati Shallow	Russell Hantz	6–3–0
21	Nicaragua	San Juan del Sur, Rivas, Nicaragua	Two tribes of ten new players divided by age	$1,000,000	16	September 15, 2010	December 19, 2010	Jud "Fabio" Birza	Chase Rice	Matthew "Sash" Lenahan	5–4–0
22	Redemption Island	San Juan del Sur, Rivas, Nicaragua	Two tribes of nine, including two returning players	$1,000,000	15	February 16, 2011	May 15, 2011	Rob Mariano	Phillip Sheppard	Natalie Tenerelli	8–1–0
23	South Pacific	Upolu, Samoa	Two tribes of nine, including two returning players	$1,000,000	16	September 14, 2011	December 18, 2011	Sophie Clarke	Benjamin "Coach" Wade	Albert Destrade	6–3–0
24	One World	Upolu, Samoa	Two tribes of nine new players divided by gender living on the same beach	$1,000,000	15	February 15, 2012	May 13, 2012	Kim Spradlin	Sabrina Thompson	Chelsea Meissner	7–2–0
25	Philippines	Caramoan, Camarines Sur, Philippines	Three tribes of six players, including three returning players who had been medically evacuated in a previous season	$1,000,000	15	September 19, 2012	December 16, 2012	Denise Stapley	Michael Skupin & Lisa Whelchel	—N/a	6–1–1
26	Caramoan	Caramoan, Camarines Sur, Philippines	Two tribes of ten: new players against past contestants	$1,000,000	15	February 13, 2013	May 12, 2013	John Cochran	Sherri Biethman & Dawn Meehan	—N/a	8–0–0
27	Blood vs. Water	Palaui Island, Santa Ana, Cagayan, Philippines	Two tribes of ten: returning contestants against their loved ones	$1,000,000	15	September 18, 2013	December 15, 2013	Tyson Apostol	Monica Culpepper	Gervase Peterson	7–1–0
28	Cagayan	Palaui Island, Santa Ana, Cagayan, Philippines	Three tribes of six new players divided by primary attribute: "brawn" vs. "brains" vs. "beauty"	$1,000,000	14	February 26, 2014	May 21, 2014	Tony Vlachos	Yung "Woo" Hwang	—N/a	8–1
29	San Juan del Sur	San Juan del Sur, Rivas, Nicaragua	Nine pairs of new players, each with a pre-existing relationship, divided into two tribes of nine	$1,000,000	15	September 24, 2014	December 17, 2014	Natalie Anderson	Jaclyn Schultz	Missy Payne	5–2–1
30	Worlds Apart	San Juan del Sur, Rivas, Nicaragua	Three tribes of six new players divided by social class: "white collar" vs. "blue collar" vs. "no collar"	$1,000,000	15	February 25, 2015	May 20, 2015	Mike Holloway	Carolyn Rivera & Will Sims II	—N/a	6–1–1
31	Cambodia	Koh Rong, Cambodia	Two tribes of ten returning players who only played once before, have not won, and were selected by public vote	$1,000,000	15	September 23, 2015	December 16, 2015	Jeremy Collins	Spencer Bledsoe & Tasha Fox	—N/a	10–0–0
32	Kaôh Rōng	Koh Rong, Cambodia	Three tribes of six new players divided by primary attribute: "brains" vs. "brawn" vs. "beauty"	$1,000,000	15	February 17, 2016	May 18, 2016	Michele Fitzgerald	Aubry Bracco	Tai Trang	5–2–0
33	Millennials vs. Gen X	Mamanuca Islands, Fiji	Two tribes of ten new players divided by generation: Millennials vs. Generation X	$1,000,000	14	September 21, 2016	December 14, 2016	Adam Klein	Ken McNickle & Hannah Shapiro	—N/a	10–0–0
34	Game Changers	Mamanuca Islands, Fiji	Two tribes of ten returning players	$1,000,000	13	March 8, 2017	May 24, 2017	Sarah Lacina	Brad Culpepper	Troy "Troyzan" Robertson	7–3–0
35	Heroes vs. Healers vs. Hustlers	Mamanuca Islands, Fiji	Three tribes of six new players divided by dominant perceived trait: "heroes" vs. "healers" vs. "hustlers	$1,000,000	14	September 27, 2017	December 20, 2017	Ben Driebergen	Chrissy Hofbeck	Ryan Ulrich	5–2–1
36	Ghost Island	Mamanuca Islands, Fiji	Two tribes of ten new players	$1,000,000	14	February 28, 2018	May 23, 2018	Wendell Holland	Domenick Abbate	Laurel Johnson	5–5–0; 1–0 (Note: The final vote was initially tied for Holland and Abbate. Johnson, who received no votes, was then tasked with casting the final tie-breaking vote.)
37	David vs. Goliath	Mamanuca Islands, Fiji	Two tribes of ten new players divided by adversity: "David" (underdogs) vs. "Goliath"	$1,000,000	14	September 26, 2018	December 19, 2018	Nick Wilson	Mike White	Angelina Keeley	7–3–0
38	Edge of Extinction	Mamanuca Islands, Fiji	Two tribes of nine, including four returning players	$1,000,000	14	February 20, 2019	May 15, 2019	Chris Underwood	Gavin Whitson	Julie Rosenberg	9–4–0
39	Island of the Idols	Mamanuca Islands, Fiji	Two tribes of ten new players. Past winners Rob Mariano and Sandra Diaz-Twine feature as non-playing mentors	$1,000,000	14	September 25, 2019	December 18, 2019	Tommy Sheehan	Dean Kowalski	Noura Salman	8–2–0
40	Winners at War	Mamanuca Islands, Fiji	Two tribes of ten winners of past Survivor seasons	$2,000,000	14	February 12, 2020	May 13, 2020	Tony Vlachos	Natalie Anderson	Michele Fitzgerald	12–4–0
41	—N/a (Note: No subtitle was used in promotion of the season. Instead, the show began following a number format similar to Big Brother and The Amazing Race.)	Mamanuca Islands, Fiji	Three tribes of six new players	$1,000,000	13	September 22, 2021	December 15, 2021	Erika Casupanan	Deshawn Radden	Xander Hastings	7–1–0
42	—N/a	Mamanuca Islands, Fiji	Three tribes of six new players	$1,000,000	13	March 9, 2022	May 25, 2022	Maryanne Oketch	Mike Turner	Romeo Escobar	7–1–0
43	—N/a	Mamanuca Islands, Fiji	Three tribes of six new players	$1,000,000	13	September 21, 2022	December 14, 2022	Mike Gabler	Cassidy Clark	Owen Knight	7–1–0
44	—N/a	Mamanuca Islands, Fiji	Three tribes of six new players	$1,000,000	13	March 1, 2023	May 24, 2023	Yamil "Yam Yam" Arocho	Heidi Lagares-Greenblatt	Carolyn Wiger	7–1–0
45	—N/a	Mamanuca Islands, Fiji	Three tribes of six players, including one returning player	$1,000,000	13	September 27, 2023	December 20, 2023	Dee Valladares	Austin Li Coon	Jake O'Kane	5–3–0
46	—N/a	Mamanuca Islands, Fiji	Three tribes of six new players	$1,000,000	13	February 28, 2024	May 22, 2024	Kenzie Petty	Charlie Davis	Ben Katzman	5–3–0
47	—N/a	Mamanuca Islands, Fiji	Three tribes of six new players	$1,000,000	14	September 18, 2024	December 18, 2024	Rachel LaMont	Sam Phalen	Sue Smey	7–1–0
48	—N/a	Mamanuca Islands, Fiji	Three tribes of six new players	$1,000,000	13	February 26, 2025	May 21, 2025	Kyle Fraser	Eva Erickson	Joe Hunter	5–2–1
49	—N/a	Mamanuca Islands, Fiji	Three tribes of six new players	$1,000,000	13	September 24, 2025	December 17, 2025	Savannah Louie	Sophi Balerdi	Sage Ahrens-Nichols	5–2–1
50	In the Hands of the Fans	Mamanuca Islands, Fiji	Three tribes of eight returning players	$2,000,000	13	February 25, 2026	May 20, 2026	Aubry Bracco	Jonathan Young	Joe Hunter	8–3–0
51	—N/a	Mamanuca Islands, Fiji	Two tribes of ten new players with one selected castaway, who would replace the first person voted out	$1,000,000	13	September 23, 2026	TBA	TBA	TBA	TBA	TBA

== Production ==
=== Concept ===
The original idea of Survivor was developed by Charlie Parsons, by his production company Planet 24 under the name Survive. He had "marooned" four strangers and filmed them on Network 7, a TV show on which he was showrunner in 1988, and started developing the format from there. It took ten years and many development teams to develop it but despite this the main TV networks in both Britain and American turned it down. It was only when Parsons went to Swedish television, he was able to find a broadcaster, ultimately producing Expedition Robinson in 1997, the most popular show of Swedish television that year. The show was a success, and plans for international versions were made.

Mark Burnett intended to be the person to bring the show to the United States, though he viewed the Swedish version as a bit crude and mean-spirited. Burnett retooled the concept to use better production values, based on his prior Eco-Challenge show, and wanted to focus more on the human drama experienced while under pressure. Burnett spent about a year trying to find a broadcaster that would take the show, retooling the concept based on feedback. On November 24, 1999, Burnett made his pitch to Les Moonves of CBS, and Moonves agreed to pick up the show. The first season, Survivor: Borneo, was filmed during March and April 2000, and was first broadcast on May 31, 2000. The first season became a ratings success, leading to its ongoing run.

=== Locations ===
The American version of Survivor has been shot in many locations around the world since the first season, usually favoring warm and tropical climates. Starting with season 19, two seasons have filmed back-to-back in the same location, to be aired in the same broadcast year. Since season 33, the show has been filmed in the Mamanuca Islands of Fiji.

Continent/ geographical region	Locations		Season number(s)
Africa	Gabon	Wonga-Wongue Presidential Reserve, Estuaire	17
Africa	Kenya	Shaba National Reserve	3
Asia	Cambodia	Koh Rong	31, 32
Asia	China	Mount Lu West Sea, Jiujiang	15
Asia	Malaysia	Pulau Tiga, Borneo, Sabah	1
Asia	Philippines	Caramoan, Camarines Sur	25, 26
Asia	Philippines	Palaui Island, Cagayan	27, 28
Asia	Thailand	Ko Tarutao	5
Central America	Guatemala	Yaxhá-Nakúm-Naranjo National Park, Petén	11
Central America	Nicaragua	San Juan del Sur	21, 22, 29, 30
Central America	Panama	Pearl Islands	7, 8, 12
Oceania	Australia	Goshen Cattle Station, Queensland	2
Oceania	Cook Islands	Aitutaki	13
Oceania	Fiji	Macuata	14
Oceania	Fiji	Mamanuca Islands	33, 34, 35, 36, 37, 38, 39, 40, 41, 42, 43, 44, 45, 46, 47, 48, 49, 50, 51
Oceania	French Polynesia	Nuku Hiva, Marquesas Islands	4
Oceania	Palau	Koror	10, 16
Oceania	Samoa	Upolu	19, 20, 23, 24
Oceania	Vanuatu	Efate	9
South America	Brazil	Rio Negro, Amazonas	6
South America	Brazil	Jalapão, Tocantins	18

From The Australian Outback to Island of the Idols, the show's run ended with a live reveal of the winner with votes read in front of a live studio audience, followed by a reunion show, hosted by Jeff Probst. Reunion shows for the first three seasons were hosted by Bryant Gumbel and the fourth season by Rosie O'Donnell. Jeff Probst took over hosting of the reunion shows starting with the fifth season. Between Africa and One World, the reunion locations alternated between Central Park, Madison Square Garden, and the Ed Sullivan Theater in New York City (home to the CBS's The Late Show franchise) and CBS Television City or the CBS Studio Center in Los Angeles. The reunion show continued to be filmed at CBS Television City from Philippines to Island of the Idols.

The exceptions to the above outlined live reunion were for Survivor: Island of the Idols, which was filmed in front of a live studio audience but taped four hours in advance due to the controversy surrounding contestant Dan Spilo's behavior, and Survivor: Winners at War, where a video conferencing event was used during the broadcast of the final episode due to the COVID-19 pandemic. The final episode of the latter did not include the live reunion, except for a brief moment at the beginning of the episode where all 20 contestants appeared together on screen from their homes, and promo for the upcoming 41st season, which had not filmed at that time.

As part of this, up through Survivor: Cagayan, the production of the last part of the recorded final Tribal Council showed Probst taking the urn or container containing the votes and traveling with it by some means, transitioning this to the live show and suggesting a type of continuity between events; for example Survivor: The Amazon appeared to have Probst jet-ski from the Amazon rainforest directly to New York City where the live show was held. According to Probst, they had also filmed a similar sequence for the 29th season Survivor: San Juan del Sur: he had paddled out on a canoe from the location in Nicaragua, and then paddling into Venice, California from a nearby island. Once on the beach, he would have asked a teenager to borrow his skateboard in the same manner as the "Hey Kid, Catch!" Coke commercial with Mean Joe Greene, with Probst doing some tricks on the skateboard before tossing it back. However, Probst had no idea how to ride a skateboard and even after some basic training, he could not complete the trick for filming. Production opted to eliminate that transition for San Juan del Sur, and they eliminated any similar transitions for future seasons.

Beginning with season 41, the winner was revealed on location during the final tribal council, which was previously done in the original season (Borneo), as the producers were unsure on the ability to have a live finale due to the COVID-19 pandemic. The vote reveal was then followed by a Survivor After Show special with the finalists and the jury instead of a live reunion. After a fan vote, the live reunion will return for Survivor 50: In the Hands of the Fans.

=== Casting ===
Early seasons of Survivor were limited to United States citizens, and have required Canadian-American dual citizens to give up their Canadian citizenship to compete, as in the case of Survivor: China winner Todd Herzog. According to Probst, the limitation was due to the rights that Mark Burnett and CBS had on the Survivor format, limiting it to contestants with American citizenship. The rules were changed mid-2018 to allow Canadian citizens to participate, with Tom Laidlaw being as the first Canadian citizen cast for Island of the Idols.

When Survivor launched, the minimum age requirement was 21 years old; one exception was made for Michael "Frosti" Zernow who competed on Survivor: China while 20 years old. In 2008, the age requirement was reduced to 18 years old, with Survivor: Tocantins's Spencer Duhm being the first 18-year-old to play.

In 2020, after criticism of inadequate inclusion on several reality shows, CBS president George Cheeks mandated that 50% of all of CBS's reality show participants are to be black, indigenous, and people of color (BIPOC). Survivor 41 was the first season to implement this rule. Probst has said this has been a positive improvement to the show, giving them more diverse stories to tell as well as increasing viewership of the series in other countries outside the U.S. The casting diversity initiative was formally discontinued following the decision by CBS to roll back its diversity, equity, and inclusion policies in April 2025. Despite the formal change in policy, casting director Jesse Tannenbaum for all of CBS's reality shows stated, "Well, from my perspective, nothing's changed. I've always, in the back of my mind, felt we needed more diversity on these shows...I'm still shooting for having a really diverse cast because I think everybody needs to be represented." Probst reiterated that casting for Survivor did not change despite the change at CBS, saying in a September 2026 interview "We need diversity. It’s for narrative. All those differences matter in the story when you throw people together and force them to rely on each other while conspiring against each other. The more diverse, the more interesting."

== Reception ==
=== U.S. television ratings ===
Survivor was consistently one of the top 20 most watched shows through its first 23 seasons. It has not broken the top 20 since. Probst acknowledged that Kelly Kahl, the current president of CBS, had been a significant proponent of the show. When Survivor had launched, Kahl, then vice-president of scheduling, took a risk and moved the show's second season to Thursdays in competition with NBC's Friends. Survivor won viewership numbers over Friends, giving Kahl significant sway within CBS to continue supporting Survivor.

Seasonal rankings (based on average total viewers per episode) of the United States version of Survivor on CBS.

Note: Each American network television season starts in late September and ends in late May, which coincides with the completion of May sweeps.

Season	Timeslot (ET) (Note: The season finales of Survivor: Marquesas, and Survivor: The Amazon through Survivor: Blood vs. Water, were aired on Sunday at 8:00 pm. Additionally, when Survivor regularly aired on Thursdays, some episodes were moved to Wednesday at 8:00 pm to accommodate broadcasts of the first two weeks of the NCAA Division I men's basketball tournament.)	Premiered		Ended			TV season	Rank	Viewers (in millions)
Season	Timeslot (ET)	Date	Premiere viewers (in millions)	Date	Finale viewers (in millions)	Reunion viewers (in millions)	TV season	Rank	Viewers (in millions)
1	Wednesday 8:00 pm	May 31, 2000	15.51	August 23, 2000	51.69	36.70	1999–2000	2	28.30
2	Thursday 8:00 pm	January 28, 2001	45.37 (Note: The season premieres of Survivor: The Australian Outback and Survivor: All-Stars each aired after a Super Bowl.)	May 3, 2001	36.35	28.01	2000–2001	1	29.80
3	Thursday 8:00 pm	October 11, 2001	23.84	January 10, 2002	27.26	19.05	2001–2002	8	20.69
4	Thursday 8:00 pm	February 28, 2002	23.19	May 19, 2002	25.87	17.89	2001–2002	6	20.77
5	Thursday 8:00 pm	September 19, 2002	23.05	December 19, 2002	24.08	20.43	2002–2003	4	21.21
6	Thursday 8:00 pm	February 13, 2003	23.26	May 11, 2003	22.29	17.65	2002–2003	9	19.97
7	Thursday 8:00 pm	September 18, 2003	21.50	December 14, 2003	25.23	21.87	2003–2004	7	20.72
8	Thursday 8:00 pm	February 1, 2004	33.53	May 9, 2004	24.76	23.92	2003–2004	3	21.49
9	Thursday 8:00 pm	September 16, 2004	20.06	December 12, 2004	19.72	15.23	2004–2005	10	19.64
10	Thursday 8:00 pm	February 17, 2005	23.66	May 15, 2005	20.80	15.48	2004–2005	5	20.91
11	Thursday 8:00 pm	September 15, 2005	18.41	December 11, 2005	21.18	15.21	2005–2006	8	18.30
12	Thursday 8:00 pm	February 2, 2006	19.20	May 14, 2006	17.07	11.65	2005–2006	11	16.82
13	Thursday 8:00 pm	September 14, 2006	18.00	December 17, 2006	16.42	13.53	2006–2007	13	15.75
14	Thursday 8:00 pm	February 8, 2007	16.68	May 13, 2007	13.63	11.43	2006–2007	15	14.83
15	Thursday 8:00 pm	September 20, 2007	15.35	December 16, 2007	15.10	12.22	2007–2008	8	15.18
16	Thursday 8:00 pm	February 7, 2008	14.02	May 11, 2008	12.92	10.84	2007–2008	11	13.61
17	Thursday 8:00 pm	September 25, 2008	13.05	December 14, 2008	13.77	11.74	2008–2009	15	13.81
18	Thursday 8:00 pm	February 12, 2009	13.63	May 17, 2009	12.94	11.59	2008–2009	19	12.86
19	Thursday 8:00 pm	September 17, 2009	11.66	December 20, 2009	13.97	11.68	2009–2010	17	12.34
20	Thursday 8:00 pm	February 11, 2010	14.15	May 16, 2010	13.46	10.65	2009–2010	14	12.60
21	Wednesday 8:00 pm	September 15, 2010	12.23	December 19, 2010	13.58	11.19	2010–2011	11	13.61
22	Wednesday 8:00 pm	February 16, 2011	11.17	May 15, 2011	13.30	10.97	2010–2011	18	12.59
23	Wednesday 8:00 pm	September 14, 2011	10.74	December 18, 2011	13.07	9.92	2011–2012	18	12.77
24	Wednesday 8:00 pm	February 15, 2012	10.79	May 13, 2012	10.34	7.72	2011–2012	26	11.64
25	Wednesday 8:00 pm	September 19, 2012	11.37	December 16, 2012	11.46	8.77	2012–2013	21	11.85
26	Wednesday 8:00 pm	February 13, 2013	8.94	May 12, 2013	10.16	8.13	2012–2013	28	10.82
27	Wednesday 8:00 pm	September 18, 2013	9.73	December 15, 2013	10.19	7.46	2013–2014	25 (Note: Starting with the 2013–14 TV series ranking, the two seasons aired in that time are listed together as Survivor. Previously, seasons were listed separately.)	11.30
28	Wednesday 8:00 pm	February 26, 2014	9.40	May 21, 2014	9.58	7.14	2013–2014	25	11.30
29	Wednesday 8:00 pm	September 24, 2014	9.75	December 17, 2014	9.79	7.31	2014–2015	31	11.35
30	Wednesday 8:00 pm	February 25, 2015	10.04	May 20, 2015	9.74	7.21	2014–2015	31	11.35
31	Wednesday 8:00 pm	September 23, 2015	9.70	December 16, 2015	9.45	6.49	2015–2016	26	10.99
32	Wednesday 8:00 pm	February 17, 2016	8.30	May 18, 2016	9.54	6.42	2015–2016	26	10.99
33	Wednesday 8:00 pm	September 21, 2016	9.46	December 14, 2016	9.09	6.40	2016–2017	24	10.32
34	Wednesday 8:00 pm	March 8, 2017	7.64	May 24, 2017	8.48	5.84	2016–2017	24	10.32
35	Wednesday 8:00 pm	September 27, 2017	8.33	December 20, 2017	8.70	5.97	2017–2018	25	10.28
36	Wednesday 8:00 pm	February 28, 2018	8.19	May 23, 2018	7.31	4.62	2017–2018	25	10.28
37	Wednesday 8:00 pm	September 26, 2018	7.83	December 19, 2018	7.72	5.17	2018–2019	32	9.43
38	Wednesday 8:00 pm	February 20, 2019	7.75	May 15, 2019	7.21	4.64	2018–2019	32	9.43
39	Wednesday 8:00 pm	September 25, 2019	6.29	December 18, 2019	6.52	4.61	2019–2020	24	9.23
40	Wednesday 8:00 pm	February 12, 2020	6.68	May 13, 2020	7.94	—N/a (Note: No reunion show was held due to the COVID-19 pandemic.)	2019–2020	24	9.23
41	Wednesday 8:00 pm	September 22, 2021	6.25	December 15, 2021	5.62	4.00	2021–2022	26	7.42
42	Wednesday 8:00 pm	March 9, 2022	4.96	May 25, 2022	5.11		2021–2022	26	7.42
43	Wednesday 8:00 pm	September 21, 2022	5.04	December 14, 2022	4.97		2022–2023	25	6.71
44	Wednesday 8:00 pm	March 1, 2023	4.76	May 24, 2023	4.41		2022–2023	25	6.71
45	Wednesday 8:00 pm	September 27, 2023	5.24	December 20, 2023	4.73		2023–2024	27	6.60
46	Wednesday 8:00 pm	February 28, 2024	4.90	May 22, 2024	4.51		2023–2024	27	6.60
47	Wednesday 8:00 pm	September 18, 2024	4.72	December 18, 2024	5.03		2024–2025	59	8.30
48	Wednesday 8:00 pm	February 26, 2025	4.27	May 21, 2025	4.56		2024–2025	52	8.30
49	Wednesday 8:00 pm	September 24, 2025	4.03	December 17, 2025	4.45		2025–2026	50	
50	Wednesday 8:00 pm	February 25, 2026	5.06	May 20, 2026	5.68		2025–2026	25	

=== Awards and nominations ===
==== Primetime Emmy Awards ====
Year	Category	Nominee/Episode	Result
2001	Outstanding Non-Fiction Program (Special Class)		Won
2001	Outstanding Sound Mixing for a Non-Fiction Program	Terrance Dwyer "Stranded"	Won
2001	Outstanding Cinematography for Non-Fiction Programming	"Honeymoon or Not?"	Nominated
2001	Outstanding Main Title Theme Music	Russ Landau	Nominated
2001	Outstanding Picture Editing for Non-Fiction Programming	"Trial by Fire"	Nominated
2001	Outstanding Technical Direction, Camerawork, Video for a Miniseries, Movie or a Special	"Survivor: The Reunion"	Nominated
2002	Outstanding Lighting Direction (Electronic, Multi-Camera) for VMC Programming	"Finale and the Reunion"	Nominated
2002	Outstanding Picture Editing for Non-Fiction Programming (Single or Multi-Camera)	"Two Peas in a Pod"	Nominated
2002	Outstanding Technical Direction, Camerawork, Video for a Series	"Finale and the Reunion"	Nominated
2003	Outstanding Art Direction for a Variety or Music Program	"The Tides Are Turning"	Nominated
2003	Outstanding Cinematography for Nonfiction Programming (Multi-Camera Productions)	"The Importance of Being Earnest"	Nominated
2003	Outstanding Picture Editing for Non-Fiction Programming (Single or Multi-Camera)	"More Than Meats the Eye"	Nominated
2003	Outstanding Reality/Competition Program		Nominated
2004	Outstanding Cinematography for Nonfiction Programming (Multi-Camera Productions)	"Beg, Barter and Steal"	Nominated
2004	Outstanding Picture Editing for Non-Fiction Programming (Single or Multi-Camera)	"Swimming with Sharks"	Nominated
2004	Outstanding Picture Editing for Non-Fiction Programming (Single or Multi-Camera)	"Shark Attack"	Nominated
2004	Outstanding Reality/Competition Program		Nominated
2004	Outstanding Sound Mixing for Nonfiction Programming (Single or Multi-Camera)	"They're Back"	Nominated
2005	Outstanding Cinematography for Nonfiction Programming (Multi-Camera Productions)	"This Has Never Happened Before"	Nominated
2005	Outstanding Picture Editing for Non-Fiction Programming (Single or Multi-Camera)	"This Has Never Happened Before"	Nominated
2005	Outstanding Picture Editing for Non-Fiction Programming (Single or Multi-Camera)	"Culture Shock and Violent Storms"	Nominated
2005	Outstanding Reality/Competition Program		Nominated
2005	Outstanding Sound Mixing for Nonfiction Programming (Single or Multi-Camera)	"Love is in the Air, Rats are Everywhere"	Nominated
2006	Outstanding Cinematography for Nonfiction Programming (Multi-Camera Productions)	"Big Trek, Big Trouble, Big Surprise"	Nominated
2006	Outstanding Picture Editing for Reality Programming	"Starvation and Lunacy"	Nominated
2006	Outstanding Picture Editing for Reality Programming	"Salvation and Desertion"	Nominated
2006	Outstanding Reality/Competition Program		Nominated
2006	Outstanding Sound Mixing for Nonfiction Programming	"Big Trek, Big Trouble, Big Surprise"	Nominated
2006	Outstanding Sound Editing for Nonfiction Programming (Single or Multi-Camera)	"Big Trek, Big Trouble, Big Surprise"	Nominated
2007	Outstanding Picture Editing for Reality Programming	"An Evil Thought"	Nominated
2008	Outstanding Picture Editing for Reality Programming	"He's a Ball of Goo!"	Nominated
2008	Outstanding Host for a Reality or Reality-Competition Program	Jeff Probst	Won
2008	Outstanding Cinematography for Reality Programming	"Just Don't Eat the Apple"	Nominated
2009	Outstanding Sound Mixing for Nonfiction Programming	"The Poison Apple Needs to Go"	Nominated
2009	Outstanding Host for a Reality or Reality-Competition Program	Jeff Probst	Won
2009	Outstanding Cinematography for Reality Programming	"This Camp is Cursed"	Nominated
2010	Outstanding Picture Editing for Reality Programming	"Tonight, We Make Our Move"	Nominated
2010	Outstanding Host for a Reality or Reality-Competition Program	Jeff Probst	Won
2010	Outstanding Cinematography for Reality Program	"Slay Everyone, Trust No One"	Won
2011	Outstanding Picture Editing for Reality Programming	"Don't You Work for Me?"	Nominated
2011	Outstanding Host for a Reality or Reality-Competition Program	Jeff Probst	Won
2011	Outstanding Cinematography for Reality Programming	"Rice Wars"	Nominated
2012	Outstanding Picture Editing for Reality Programming	"Cult-Like"	Nominated
2012	Outstanding Cinematography for Reality Programming	"Running the Show"	Nominated
2013	Outstanding Sound Editing for Nonfiction Programming (Single or Multi-Camera)	"Create a Little Chaos"	Nominated
2013	Outstanding Sound Mixing for Nonfiction Programming	"Create a Little Chaos"	Nominated
2013	Outstanding Cinematography for Reality Program	"Create a Little Chaos"	Nominated
2013	Outstanding Picture Editing for Reality Programming	"Zipping Over the Cuckoo's Nest"	Nominated
2013	Outstanding Directing for Nonfiction Programming	"Live Finale and Reunion" (Survivor: Caramoan)	Nominated
2013	Outstanding Directing for Nonfiction Programming	"Live Finale and Reunion" (Survivor: Philippines)	Nominated
2014	Outstanding Cinematography for Reality Programming	"Mad Treasure Hunt"	Nominated
2014	Outstanding Picture Editing for Reality Program	"Mad Treasure Hunt"	Nominated
2015	Outstanding Cinematography for Reality Program	"It's Survivor Warfare"	Nominated
2015	Outstanding Picture Editing for Reality Program	"It's Survivor Warfare"	Nominated
2016	Outstanding Cinematography for Reality Program	"Second Chance"	Nominated
2016	Outstanding Picture Editing for a Structured or Competition Reality Program	"Signed, Sealed and Delivered"	Nominated
2017	Outstanding Casting for a Reality Program	Lynne Spiegel Spillman	Nominated
2017	Outstanding Cinematography for Reality Program	"The Stakes Have Been Raised"	Nominated
2017	Outstanding Picture Editing for a Structured or Competition Reality Program	"About to Have a Rumble"	Nominated
2019	Outstanding Cinematography for Reality Program	Series Body of Work	Nominated
2019	Outstanding Picture Editing for a Structured or Competition Reality Program	"Appearances Are Deceiving"	Nominated
2020	Outstanding Cinematography for Reality Program	Series Body of Work	Nominated
2020	Outstanding Picture Editing for a Structured or Competition Reality Program	"It's Like a Survivor Economy"	Nominated
2022	Outstanding Cinematography for Reality Program	Series Body of Work	Nominated
2023	Outstanding Cinematography for Reality Program	Series Body of Work	Nominated
2023	Outstanding Picture Editing for a Structured or Competition Reality Program	"Telenovela"	Nominated
2023	Outstanding Reality Competition Program		Nominated
2024	Outstanding Cinematography for Reality Program	Series Body of Work	Nominated
2024	Outstanding Host for a Reality or Reality-Competition Program	Jeff Probst	Nominated
2025	Outstanding Casting for a Reality Program	Jesse Tannenbaum, Caitlin Moore, Penni Lane Clifton, Daniel Gradias, Lisa Visagie, Christian Estrada	Nominated
2025	Outstanding Cinematography for Reality Program	Series Body of Work	Nominated
2025	Outstanding Host for a Reality or Reality-Competition Program	Jeff Probst	Nominated
2025	Outstanding Reality Competition Program		Nominated

==== Other awards ====
Year	Association	Category	Result	Ref.
2001	TCA Awards	Program of the Year	Nominated	
2001	TCA Awards	Outstanding New Program	Nominated	
2011	TCA Awards	Outstanding Achievement in Reality Programming	Nominated	
2013	TCA Awards	Outstanding Achievement in Reality Programming	Nominated	
2013	Critics' Choice Television Awards	Best Reality Series – Competition	Nominated	
2014	Critics' Choice Television Awards	Best Reality Series – Competition	Nominated	
2014	TCA Awards	Outstanding Achievement in Reality Programming	Nominated	
2016	TCA Awards	Outstanding Achievement in Reality Programming	Nominated	
2017	TCA Awards	Outstanding Achievement in Reality Programming	Nominated	
2018	GLAAD Media Awards	Outstanding Reality Program	Won	
2019	Critics' Choice Real TV Awards	Competition Series	Nominated	
2020	Critics' Choice Real TV Awards	Competition Series	Nominated	
2020	Critics' Choice Real TV Awards	Show Host for Jeff Probst	Nominated	
2026	Kids' Choice Awards	Favorite TV Show Reality Competition	Nominated	

== Post-show auctions ==
At the end of each American Survivor season from Survivor: Africa onward, various Survivor props and memorabilia are auctioned online for charity. The most common recipient has been the Elizabeth Glaser Pediatric AIDS Foundation. Most recently, proceeds have gone toward The Serpentine Project, a charity founded by Jeff Probst, dedicated to helping those transitioning out of foster care upon emancipation at 18 years of age. Items up for auction have included flags, mats, tree mails, contestant torches, contestant clothing, autographed items, immunity idols and the voting urn.

== Controversies and legal action ==
- In February 2001, Stacey Stillman filed a lawsuit claiming that producers interfered in the process of Survivor: Borneo by persuading two members of her tribe (Sean Kenniff and Dirk Been) to vote her off instead of Rudy Boesch.
- During a reward trip on Survivor: The Australian Outback, Colby Donaldson removed coral from the Great Barrier Reef and, on the same trip, a helicopter involved with the production crew flew around protected seabird rookeries. Both acts violated Australian law and the incidents could have resulted in fines up to A$110,000. Mark Burnett, the executive producer, issued an apology on behalf of Donaldson and the Survivor production team.
- At the tribal immunity challenge for the final four players on Survivor: Africa, host Jeff Probst asked which female player in their season had no piercings. Kim Johnson answered Kelly Goldsmith, got the point, and went on to win the challenge, which put her through to the final three and ultimately (after winning another immunity challenge) the final two. Unbeknownst to the producers, another contestant on "Africa", Lindsey Richter, also had no piercings. Lex van den Berghe's answer had been Lindsey, but the show did not award him a point, which could have significantly changed the outcome of the challenge and the overall game. CBS later paid van den Berghe and Tom Buchanan, who had finished in fourth place, a settlement.
- Paul Winter sued Russell Landau (composer of the Survivor theme song) and Mark Burnett (series producer) for $800,000 in 2001. Winter stated that he did not agree to have samples of the song "Kurski Funk" from his Earthbeat album to be used in the official Survivor theme song, called "Ancient Voices." Landau said to Entertainment Weekly that the song is "...part of an ancient Russian folk song that I've totally bastardised." The case was later settled out of court. Landau is a former member of Winter's band, the Paul Winter Consort, which won a Grammy in 1995 for Best New Age Album.
- In the fifth episode of Survivor: All-Stars, a naked Richard Hatch put his hands behind his head and thrust his genitals towards Sue Hawk, saying "you want some?", after she blocked his path during an immunity challenge. Hatch was voted out that day for other reasons, but Hawk quit the game two days later as a result of what had happened. Hawk considered filing a lawsuit against the parties involved, but she appeared with Hatch on The Early Show the morning after the sixth episode aired, stating she opted out of legal action because CBS had helped her "deal with the situation".
- In January 2006, Richard Hatch, the winner of the first season of Survivor, was charged and found guilty of failing to report his winnings to the IRS to avoid taxes. He was sentenced to four years and three months in prison.
- In the beginning of Survivor: Cook Islands, the tribes were grouped according to their race. Probst claimed the choice came from the criticism that Survivor was "not ethnically diverse enough", but several long-term sponsors, including Campbell's Soup, Procter & Gamble, Home Depot, and Coca-Cola dropped their support of the show shortly after this announcement, leading to speculation that the decisions were in response to the controversy. Each company has either denied the link to the controversy or declined to comment.
- The selection process for the 14th season came under fire when it was revealed that, of the entire Survivor: Fiji cast, only Gary Stritesky had gone through the application process for the show; the rest of the contestants were recruited. Probst defended the process, citing finding diversity of cast as a reason.
- At the Survivor: China reunion show, Denise Martin told producers and the audience that she had been demoted to a janitor from a lunch lady due to the distraction she was to students from her appearance on the show. Because of her misfortune, Burnett awarded Martin $50,000. But Martin would later recant her story after the school district she worked for publicly stated that she had taken the custodial position before appearing on the show. Martin then decided to donate the $50,000 to charity.
- A brief uncensored shot of Marcus Lehman's genitals during the premiere episode of Survivor: Gabon led to the show and network being asked to apologize for the incident.
- Jim Early (aka Missyae), who was a user on one of the fan forums for Survivor, was sued by Burnett, his production company, and CBS in August 2010, for allegedly releasing detailed spoiler information for Survivor: Samoa and Survivor: Heroes vs. Villains. Early revealed that he was getting his information from Russell Hantz, a contestant on both seasons, through both phone calls and emails. Early complied in the lawsuit by providing such evidence, eventually leading to its dismissal in January 2011. Although legal action was never taken against Hantz, the contract for a player in Survivor includes a liability of up to $5 million for the premature revealing of a season's results. Hantz has stated that the claim is false.
- Contestants who did not make the jury in Survivor: Caramoan were not allowed on stage for the reunion show. While Jeff Probst claimed that the new stage could not accommodate all of the attending contestants, the format change was panned because the show's fans and fellow contestants felt that it was unfair for them to be left out in the audience. Erik Reichenbach, who finished 5th and did not even get a chance to speak at the reunion, called out the producers for their treatment of the contestants. Calling it a farce, he criticized how the reunion show left so many unanswered questions about the other contestants and his own evacuation during the season finale. He also criticized how the pre-jury members were completely left out in favor of featuring the show's former contestants, like Rob Mariano and Rudy Boesch.
- In the sixth episode of Survivor: Game Changers, Jeff Varner revealed at Tribal Council that fellow contestant Zeke Smith was a transgender man. This caused an immediate uproar amongst his tribemates and host Jeff Probst, which led to Varner's immediate elimination. The incident was covered by various news outlets, with fans heavily criticizing Varner's actions. Varner explained himself following the episode's airdate and expressed regret for his actions. Varner was also fired from his real estate job after the episode aired.
- Before the premiere of Survivor: David vs. Goliath, contestant Alec Merlino posted a photo of himself on Instagram with fellow contestant Kara Kay containing the caption "F*** it". This action broke Merlino's NDA with the show and he was consequently stripped of all appearance fees and banned from the live reunion show. Merlino did not have to pay the standard $5 million penalty for breaking the agreement, however.
- In the eighth episode of the 39th season Survivor: Island of the Idols, contestant Dan Spilo was issued a warning by producers for inappropriately touching fellow contestants including Kellee Kim. Contestants Elizabeth Beisel and Missy Byrd came under fire for exploiting the situation as a strategic tool in voting out Kim later that episode. This moment has since been criticized by various news outlets for the reactions of Beisel and Byrd as well as the handling of the situation by producers. Beisel and Byrd later apologized, along with fellow contestants Lauren Beck and Aaron Meredith. Jeff Probst, CBS, and MGM released a statement about what happened and the production's reaction as well. Spilo was later removed from the game at the end of episode 12 after "a report of another incident, which happened off-camera and did not involve a player". This is the first time a contestant has been ejected from the show by production. Spilo apologized to all involved for his behavior following the finale's broadcast. Because of the incident, the season's finale was not shown live but instead from an earlier live-to-tape recording, the first time since the live finale format was introduced. Further, CBS and Survivor announced they will revamp the show's rules and production to focus more on earlier detection and prevention of this type of inappropriate behavior, and strict penalties for castaways that engage in it, to be fully in place by the 41st season (the first season produced following the airing of Island of the Idols).
- During the pre-game sequester period of Survivor 49, two original cast members were discovered to have been colluding. The situation escalated to the point that both were removed from the game before it officially began. They were subsequently replaced by alternates Jason Treul and MC Chukwujekwu. Additionally, third place finisher Sage Ahrens-Nichols alleged that two other castaways, Jake Latimer and Sophi Balerdi, also engaged in pre-game scheming; these claims were corroborated by fellow castaway Annie Davis who was on the same starting tribe as Latimer and Balerdi.
- In the finale of Survivor 50: In the Hands of the Fans, Probst brought out Rizo Velovic and began speaking with him about his fire-making abilities. During the discussion, Probst accidentally spoiled the outcome of the challenge before it aired by referring to Velovic as the final member of the jury. After returning from the commercial break, Probst acknowledged the mistake and later admitted that he and production had gotten ahead of themselves.

== Merchandise ==
The success of Survivor spawned a wide range of merchandise from the first season. While early items available were limited to buffs, water bottles, hats, T-shirts, and other typical souvenir items, the marketability of the franchise has grown tremendously. Today, fans can find innumerable items, including computer and board games, interactive online games, mugs, tribal-themed jewelry, beach towels, dog tags, magnets, multi-function tools, DVD seasons, Survivor party kits, insider books, soundtracks, and more.

== Home media releases ==
Best of

DVD name	Release date
Season One: The Greatest and Most Outrageous Moments	January 9, 2001
Season Two: The Greatest and Most Outrageous Moments	September 25, 2001

Full seasons

Seasons 1, 2, 7, 8, 9 and 10 were released in stores. The remaining seasons have been released exclusively on Amazon.com through their CreateSpace manufacture on demand program. Select seasons have also been released on Blu-ray.

DVD name	DVD release date
The Complete First Season: Borneo	May 11, 2004
The Complete Second Season: The Australian Outback	Store Release: April 26, 2005; MOD Release: August 2, 2022
The Complete Third Season: Africa	October 5, 2010
The Complete Fourth Season: Marquesas	October 5, 2010
The Complete Fifth Season: Thailand	October 25, 2011
The Complete Sixth Season: The Amazon	November 22, 2011
The Complete Seventh Season: Pearl Islands	February 7, 2006
The Complete Eighth Season: All-Stars	September 14, 2004
The Complete Ninth Season: Vanuatu – Islands of Fire	December 5, 2006
The Complete Tenth Season: Palau	August 29, 2006
The Complete Eleventh Season: Guatemala – The Maya Empire	May 22, 2012
The Complete Twelfth Season: Panama – Exile Island	May 22, 2012
The Complete Thirteenth Season: Cook Islands	December 11, 2012
The Complete Fourteenth Season: Fiji	December 11, 2012
The Complete Fifteenth Season: China	January 27, 2014
The Complete Sixteenth Season: Micronesia – Fans vs. Favorites	January 31, 2014
The Complete Seventeenth Season: Gabon – Earth's Last Eden	September 11, 2014
The Complete Eighteenth Season: Tocantins – The Brazilian Highlands	August 5, 2014
The Complete Nineteenth Season: Samoa	November 18, 2014
The Complete Twentieth Season: Heroes vs. Villains	February 22, 2011
The Complete Twenty-First Season: Nicaragua	November 18, 2014
The Complete Twenty-Second Season: Redemption Island	October 7, 2015
The Complete Twenty-Third Season: South Pacific	October 7, 2015
The Complete Twenty-Fourth Season: One World	September 23, 2016
The Complete Twenty-Fifth Season: Philippines	September 23, 2016
The Complete Twenty-Sixth Season: Caramoan – Fans vs. Favorites	October 26, 2017
The Complete Twenty-Seventh Season: Blood vs. Water	November 13, 2017
The Complete Twenty-Eighth Season: Cagayan	December 22, 2017
The Complete Twenty-Ninth Season: San Juan del Sur – Blood vs. Water	October 15, 2018
The Complete Thirtieth Season: Worlds Apart	November 13, 2018
The Complete Thirty-First Season: Cambodia – Second Chance	November 13, 2018
The Complete Thirty-Second Season: Kaôh Rōng	November 21, 2018
The Complete Thirty-Third Season: Millennials vs. Gen X	November 21, 2018
The Complete Thirty-Fourth Season: Game Changers – Mamanuca Islands	February 22, 2019
The Complete Thirty-Fifth Season: Heroes vs. Healers vs. Hustlers	May 9, 2019
The Complete Thirty-Sixth Season: Ghost Island	June 12, 2019
The Complete Thirty-Seventh Season: David vs. Goliath	July 17, 2019
The Complete Thirty-Eighth Season: Edge of Extinction	January 31, 2020
The Complete Thirty-Ninth Season: Island of the Idols	December 15, 2020
The Complete Fortieth Season: Winners at War	April 13, 2021
The Complete Forty-First Season	April 12, 2022
The Complete Forty-Second Season	August 23, 2022
The Complete Forty-Third Season	March 28, 2023

Paramount+

All seasons are available on Paramount+, Skydance's over-the-top subscription streaming service in the United States. Australia only has Season 35 onwards available due to expired licencing rights. Seasons of Australian Survivor were also added to Paramount+ in the United States and Australia after CBS acquired Network 10 in 2017.

Pluto TV

Survivor was added to Pluto TV, ViacomCBS's free Internet television service, as a standalone channel along on September 1, 2020.

== Other media ==
=== Card game ===
Survivor: The Tribe Has Spoken card game was released in January 2025, the result of a two-year collaboration between host and executive producer Jeff Probst and gaming company Exploding Kittens. Players need to collect advantages, find idols, form alliances and survive Tribal Council eliminations. The game can be played with three to six people.

=== Video games ===
The 2001 PC video game Survivor: The Interactive Game, developed by Magic Lantern and published by Infogrames, allows players to play and create characters for the game based on the Borneo or Australian Outback cast members. The game also includes a character creation system for making custom characters.

Gameplay consists of choosing survivors' skills (fishing, cooking, etc.), forming alliances, developing relationships with other tribe members, and voting off competitors at tribal council.

The game was very poorly received by critics. GameSpot gave the game a 'Terrible' score of 2.0 out of 10, saying "If you're harboring even a tiny urge to buy this game, please listen very carefully to this advice: Don't do it." Likewise, IGN gave the game a 'Painful' 2.4 out of 10, stating "It is horribly boring and repetitive. The graphics are weak and even the greatest Survivor fan would break the CD in two after playing it for 20 minutes." The game was the recipient of Game Revolution's lowest score of all time, an F−. An 'interactive review' was created specially for the game, and features interactive comments like "The Survival periods are about as much fun as" followed by a drop-down menu, "watching paint dry/throbbing hemorrhoids/staring at air/being buried alive."

On November 4, 2009, it was announced that a second video game adaptation would be released for the Wii and Nintendo DS. The game would require players to participate in various challenges like those in the reality shows in order to win.

=== Soundtracks ===
Various soundtracks have been released featuring music composed by Russ Landau, including soundtracks for seasons 9 through 27 (with the exception of season 14).

=== Thrill ride ===
The Tiki Twirl thrill ride at California's Great America in Santa Clara, California was originally called Survivor: The Ride. The ride includes a rotating platform that moves along an undulating track. Riders can be sprayed by water guns hidden in oversized tribal masks. Theme elements included drums and other familiar Survivor musical accents playing in the background, Survivor memorabilia throughout the queue and other merchandise for sale in nearby gift shops.

=== Animated film ===
In June 2026, it was announced that an animated comedy film based on the series was in development at Paramount Animation, with Probst set to serve as an executive producer on the film. The film will center on animal contestants from across the globe as they compete for a once-in-a-lifetime chance to become the sole Survivor.
