= Survivor 41 =

- Season 41
- Presented by: Jeff Probst
- No. of days: 26
- No. of castaways: 18
- Winner: Erika Casupanan
- Runner-up: Deshawn Radden
- Location: Mamanuca Islands, Fiji
- No. of episodes: 13

Release
- Original network: CBS
- Original release: September 22 – December 15, 2021

Additional information
- Filming dates: April 15 – May 10, 2021

Season chronology
- ← Previous; Winners at War Next → Survivor 42

Survivor 41 is the forty-first season of the American competition television series Survivor. The season was first broadcast on September 22, 2021, on CBS in the United States and Global in Canada.

The finale aired on December 15, 2021, when Erika Casupanan was voted the Sole Survivor, defeating Deshawn Radden and Xander Hastings in a 7–1–0 vote. Casupanan also became the first Canadian castaway to win the title, (Note: Survivor: China winner Todd Herzog was born in the United States but had Canadian citizenship through his mother.) the third Asian castaway to win (following Yul Kwon in season 13, Survivor: Cook Islands and Natalie Anderson in season 29, Survivor: San Juan del Sur), the first of Filipino descent to win, and the first woman to win in seven seasons, the last one being Sarah Lacina in season 34, Survivor: Game Changers.

== Format ==
Survivor is a reality television show based on the Swedish show Expedition Robinson, created by Mark Burnett and Charlie Parsons. The series follows a number of participants isolated in a remote location, where they must provide food, fire, and shelter. One by one, a participant is removed from the series by majority vote, with challenges held to give a reward (ranging from living- and food-related prizes to a car) and immunity from being voted out of the series. The last remaining player receives a prize of $1,000,000.

== Contestants ==
The cast of Survivor 41.

The cast was composed of 18 new players divided into three tribes: Luvu, Ua, and Yase. The tribe names come from the Fijian words for "flood", "wave", and "lightning" respectively. The merged tribe was named Viakana, which comes from the Fijian phrase for "hungry", which was suggested by Erika Casupanan.

The cast included retired National Football League player Danny McCray. Erika Casupanan became the second Canadian resident to compete on the show since the casting process was opened to Canadian residents in 2018.

Contestant Evvie Jagoda would come out as non-binary following the season, making them the first non-binary person to play Survivor, although they competed as a female.

List of Survivor 41 contestants
Contestant	Age	From	Tribe			Finish	
Contestant	Age	From	Original	None	Merged	Placement	Day
Eric Abraham	51	San Antonio, Texas	Yase			1st voted out	Day 3
Sara Wilson	24	Boston, Massachusetts	Ua			2nd voted out	Day 3
David Voce	35	Chicago, Illinois	Yase			3rd voted out	Day 5
Brad Reese	50	Shawnee, Wyoming	Ua			4th voted out	Day 7
Jairus "JD" Robinson	20	Oklahoma City, Oklahoma	Ua			5th voted out	Day 9
Genie Chen	46	Portland, Oregon	Ua			6th voted out	Day 11
Sydney Segal	26	Brooklyn, New York	Luvu	None (Note: At the start of the individual phase of the game on Day 12, castaways had to earn their way into the merged tribe by either winning immunity or surviving the Day 14 Tribal Council.)		7th voted out	Day 14
Tiffany Seely	47	Plainview, New York	Yase	None	Viakana	8th voted out 1st jury member	Day 16
Naseer Muttalif	37	Morgan Hill, California	Luvu	None	Viakana	9th voted out 2nd jury member	Day 17
Evvie Jagoda	28	Arlington, Massachusetts	Yase	None	Viakana	10th voted out 3rd jury member	Day 17
Shantel "Shan" Smith	34	Washington, D.C.	Ua	None	Viakana	11th voted out 4th jury member	Day 19
Liana Wallace	20	Washington, D.C.	Yase	None	Viakana	12th voted out 5th jury member	Day 21
Danny McCray	33	Frisco, Texas	Luvu	None	Viakana	13th voted out 6th jury member	Day 23
Ricard Foyé	31	Sedro-Woolley, Washington	Ua	None	Viakana	14th voted out 7th jury member	Day 24
Heather Aldret	52	Charleston, South Carolina	Luvu	None	Viakana	Eliminated; 8th jury member	Day 25
Xander Hastings	21	Chicago, Illinois	Yase	None	Viakana	2nd runner-up	Day 26
Deshawn Radden	26	Miami, Florida	Luvu	None	Viakana	Runner-up	Day 26
Erika Casupanan	31	Toronto, Ontario	Luvu	None	Viakana	Sole Survivor	Day 26

=== Future appearances ===
Player Ricard Foyé co-hosted the Drop Your Buffs, a companion program of Australian Survivor for its Australia vs. The World season.

Outside of Survivor, Danny McCray and Shan Smith competed on the first season of The Challenge: USA. In 2023, McCray competed on The Challenge: World Championship. Erika Casupanan competed on the first season of The Traitors Canada. Sydney Segal competed on The Challenge: Vets & New Threats in 2025.

== Season summary ==
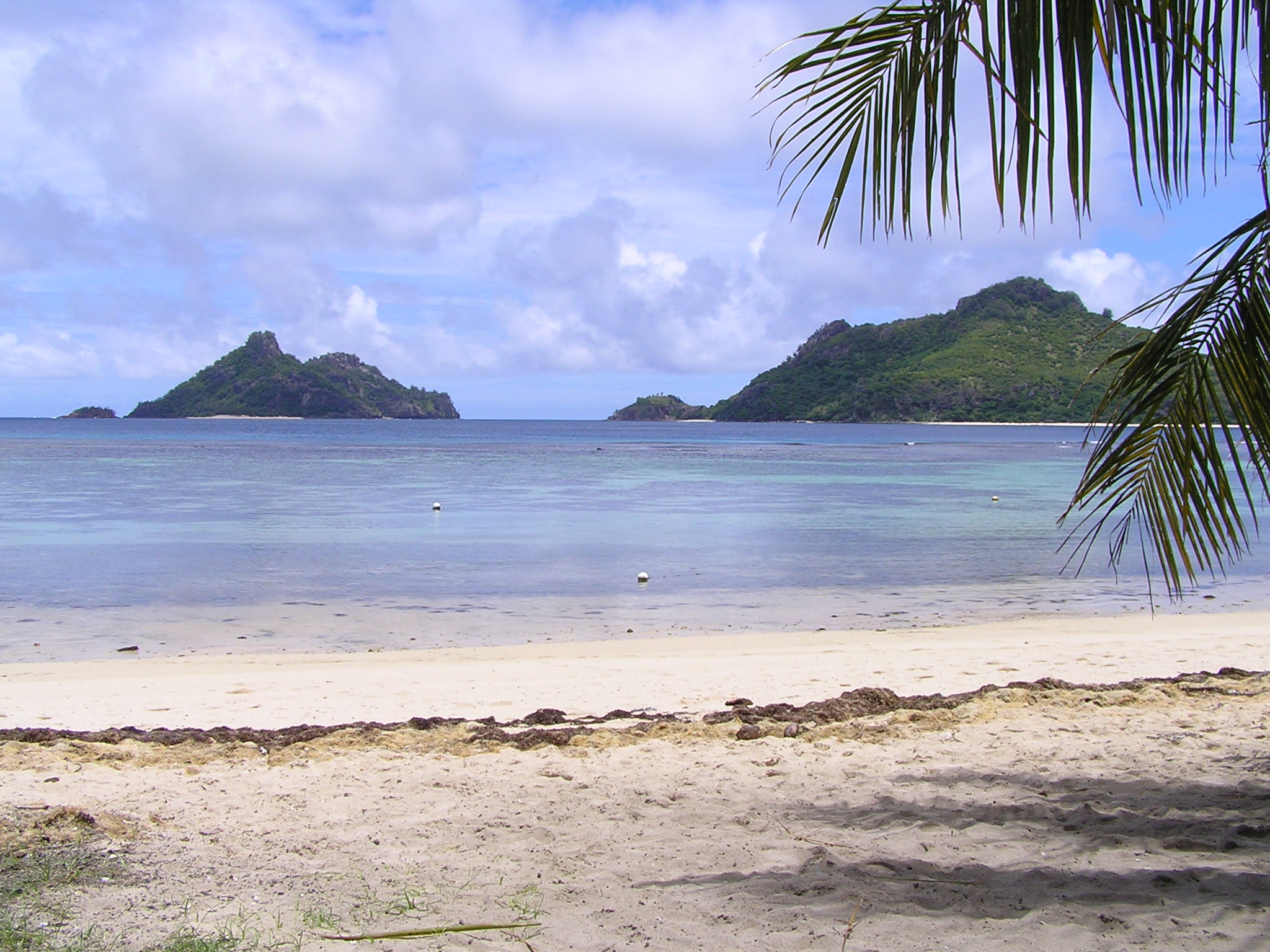
The season filmed in the Mamanuca Islands of Fiji.

Eighteen new castaways were divided into three tribes of six: Luvu, Ua, and Yase. Luvu went undefeated in immunity challenges, while Yase got off to a rough start, losing the first two. Dominated by a women's alliance, they made up for the numbers deficit while Ua dwindled down to just Shan and Ricard. Their strong partnership enabled them to reach the merge, where they initially aligned with Luvu against the surviving Yase members. Liana turned against her old tribe to align with Danny, Deshawn, and Shan in a final four deal. However, Danny and Deshawn aligned with the others under Ricard and Erika's lead to take out a power player in Shan, busting the game open.

When there were six players left, Deshawn tried to pit longtime allies Erika and Heather against each other, to no avail. Despite being targeted for this, he and the others voted out a big threat in Ricard when he was not immune. Xander won the final challenge and brought Erika to the end in hopes that she wouldn't get to add beating someone at fire to her resume. Deshawn narrowly beat Heather to join them in the final three. In the end, Erika's subtly strong strategic and social game earned her the victory in a 7–1–0 vote over Deshawn and Xander.

Episode			Challenge winner(s)		Journey	Eliminated	
No.	Title	Air date	Reward	Immunity	Journey	Tribe	Player
1	"A New Era"	September 22, 2021	Ua	Luvu	Danny (Luvu)	Yase	Abraham
1	"A New Era"	September 22, 2021	Ua	Luvu	JD (Ua)	Ua	Sara
1	"A New Era"	September 22, 2021	Ua	Luvu	Xander (Yasa)	Ua	Sara
2	"Juggling Chainsaws"	September 29, 2021	Luvu		Deshawn (Luvu)	Yase	Voce
2	"Juggling Chainsaws"	September 29, 2021	Ua		Evie (Yasa)	Yase	Voce
3	"My Million Dollar Mistake"	October 6, 2021	Luvu		Brad (Ua)	Ua	Brad
3	"My Million Dollar Mistake"	October 6, 2021	Yase		Sydney (Luvu)	Ua	Brad
3	"My Million Dollar Mistake"	October 6, 2021	Yase		Tiffany (Yasa)	Ua	Brad
4	"They Hate Me Because They Ain't Me"	October 13, 2021	Ua	Yase	None	Ua	JD
4	"They Hate Me Because They Ain't Me"	October 13, 2021	Yase	Luvu	None	Ua	JD
5	"The Strategist or The Loyalist"	October 20, 2021	Yase		Liana (Yasa)	Ua	Genie
5	"The Strategist or The Loyalist"	October 20, 2021	Luvu		Shan (Ua)	Ua	Genie
6	"Ready to Play Like a Lion"	October 27, 2021	~~Danny, Deshawn, Evvie,~~; ~~Ricard, Sydney, [Naseer]~~ (Note: The winners were allowed to save an extra player and invite that player to the reward; they chose Naseer.) (Erika, Heather, Liana, Shan, Tiffany, Xander) (Note: Erika was exiled after not being chosen to join the winning team's reward and share in their immunity. At Exile Island, she was given the opportunity to either keep the game moving as is, allowing the winning team to keep their immunity, or go back in time and change the outcome, in which she and the losing team would be given immunity instead. Her decision, which was not revealed until the next episode, was to change the outcome and give immunity to the losing team, a move that occurred after the original winning team had enjoyed their reward.)		Erika	None (Note: The episode ended on a cliffhanger and no one was voted out.)	
7	"There's Gonna Be Blood"	November 3, 2021	~~Danny, Deshawn, Evvie,~~; ~~Ricard, Sydney, [Naseer]~~ (Erika, Heather, Liana, Shan, Tiffany, Xander)		Erika	None	Sydney
7	"There's Gonna Be Blood"	November 3, 2021		Ricard	Erika	None	Sydney
8	"Betraydar"	November 10, 2021	Danny, Deshawn, Erika, Evvie, Ricard	Evvie	None	Viakana	Tiffany
9	"Who's Who in the Zoo"	November 17, 2021	Xander [Danny, Deshawn, Evvie, Liana] (Note: In addition to immunity, Xander won reward for his entire team for lasting the longest in the challenge.)	Erika	None	Viakana	Naseer
9	"Who's Who in the Zoo"	November 17, 2021	Xander [Danny, Deshawn, Evvie, Liana]	Xander	None	Viakana	Evvie
10	"Baby with a Machine Gun"	November 24, 2021	Ricard [Heather, Shan, Xander]	Ricard	None	Viakana	Shan
11	"Do or Die"	December 1, 2021	None	Danny [Deshawn] (Note: Deshawn lost the immunity challenge, and therefore had to play "Do or Die" at tribal council; he won, and was granted immunity.)	None	Viakana	Liana
12	"Truth Kamikaze"	December 8, 2021	Deshawn, Erika, Xander	Ricard	None	Viakana	Danny
13	"One Thing Left to Do... Win"	December 15, 2021	Erika [Heather]	Erika	None	Viakana	Ricard
13	"One Thing Left to Do... Win"	December 15, 2021	None	Xander (Note: For winning the final Immunity Challenge, Xander had to assign additional immunity to another player, with the remaining two competing in a fire-making challenge to determine the third finalist; he gave additional immunity to Erika.) [Erika]	None	Viakana	Heather

== Episodes ==
No. overall	No. in season	Title	Rating/share (18-49)	Original release date	U.S. viewers (millions)
597	1	"A New Era"	1.1/8	September 22, 2021	6.25
The 18 new castaways were welcomed by Jeff before being informed of their first challenge, as well as the fact that they would start with meager supplies.: Reward Challenge: Tribes had to find six paddles then jump into the ocean toward their boat. After unclipping the front and back of their boat, tribe members worked together to paddle around a buoy and to a flint. The first tribe to get the flint won it as well as a pot and a machete.; Luvu jumped to an early lead, while Yase did not put up a contest. However, Luvu failed to unclip the anchor of their boat, leading to Ua pulling away with the victory. While setting up the tribe's camp, JD started Ua's fire and forged bonds with his tribemates, but some of them saw his attempts as overbearing. Shan, however, approached JD for an alliance. As punishment for losing the opening challenge, Luvu and Yase had four hours to either solve a puzzle or nominate two tribe members to carry ocean water to fill two large buckets. Both tribes selected the latter task; Danny and Deshawn went for Luvu, while Voce (reluctantly) and Xander went for Yase. While both pairs were successful, Naseer reported to his tribemates that he believed the former pair were looking for an idol during the task, which set the two of them against Naseer. At Yase, Abraham expressed concerns about Tiffany's performance in the opening challenge, and Liana relayed this to Tiffany. On Day 2, the three tribes were asked to pick a representative to take a journey; Danny volunteered for Luvu, JD was sent for Ua by random draw, and Yase agreed on Xander. The three bonded during a long walk, then were faced with a private decision to risk or protect their vote. Only Xander was shown choosing to risk, meaning he received an extra vote advantage. JD's story about protecting his vote upon coming back to camp was not believed by Ricard.: Immunity Challenge: Tribes went over a net climb and under a low beam, then worked together to transport large bags of puzzle pieces using a push cart. They then maneuvered the cart up flights of stairs with the bags before solving a 3D jigsaw puzzle. The first tribe to finish won immunity. The losing tribes had to forfeit their flint until the next immunity challenge.; Luvu came from behind to win the challenge. At Yase, Abraham worked on convincing the tribe to vote out Tiffany to preserve strength, while Tiffany searched for an idol. Evvie, who had bonded with Tiffany, likewise tried to sway tribemates to vote out Abraham. At Ua, Sara and JD targeted each other; while Ricard sided with Sara, Brad stated that Sara and Shan were on the chopping block due to faltering in the puzzle. Meanwhile, Shan was torn on who to vote out. At Yase's Tribal Council, tribe strength was discussed, and a new twist was introduced to the viewers. Shot in the Dark allowed castaways to take a 1 in 6 shot at being safe from the vote, but if they took the chance, they would lose their vote. Xander discovered his extra vote, and Yase stayed united to vote out Abraham. At Ua's Tribal Council, whispering between Sara and Shan started a live tribal in which Brad was targeted for his earlier statement against the two women, while JD tried to convince Shan that voting out Brad was a bad idea. Shan convinced JD to vote for Sara, and told Sara not to use her Shot in the Dark. During the vote, it was revealed that JD did risk his vote to earn the advantage, and Sara was ultimately voted out.
598	2	"Juggling Chainsaws"	1.0/8	September 29, 2021	5.90
At Ua, JD and Ricard discussed voting out Brad by the water well, but Brad eavesdropped on the conversation from the bushes. He told Shan, who relayed Brad’s suspicions to Ricard. At Luvu, Deshawn struggled with starting a fire, so Naseer stepped in to help, earning Sydney’s respect. At Yase, Tiffany expressed how exhausting the season was for her, and Xander searched for an advantage. He found a “Beware” advantage: an idol that only works when someone from all three tribes found their respective ones (having to say a secret phrase at a challenge to confirm the idols are in power). Until then, Xander would not be able to vote at Tribal Council. He told Voce and Evvie, the latter of whom told Liana and Tiffany in hopes of forming an all-girls alliance.: Immunity/Reward Challenge: Tribe members must traverse an obstacle course in the ocean, with the first member unclipping a key underwater. Once all tribe members are across, they would solve a turtle puzzle. The first two tribes to finish won immunity and fishing gear. The losing tribe had to forfeit their flint until the next immunity challenge.; Xander said his secret phrase, but was met with silence from the other tribes. Luvu placed first and Ua placed second after Tiffany struggled for Yase in the challenge. For placing first, Luvu had to send someone from Yase and someone either from their own tribe or from Ua to go on a journey. They chose Evvie, then Deshawn volunteered. During their time together, Evvie told Deshawn how idols worked this season and expressed that their vote was crucial, urging him to risk his so he could get an extra vote and that they could work together in the future. Back at Yase, the girls planned on blindsiding Xander until Tiffany grew paranoid over Xander playing an idol (though it didn’t have power yet), proposing voting out Voce instead. This made Evvie and Liana consider voting out Tiffany to preserve strength, but at Tribal Council, the women stuck together to blindside Voce from the game.
599	3	"My Million Dollar Mistake"	0.9/7	October 6, 2021	5.79
All of the Ua tribe searched for the idol which was found by allies Brad and Genie. Brad also disclosed their discovery to Shan so as to build trust. Additionally, Brad found a second “Beware” advantage requiring him to travel to a separate island or else lose his vote. Tiffany had likewise found a similar note on Yase, as did Sydney on Luvu. Once on the separate island, the three were faced with a decision: a steal-a-vote or a tarp. If all three chose tarp, all three tribes would receive a tarp. If all three chose steal-a-vote, all three lost their next vote. A split decision meant those who chose tarp would get nothing and those who chose steal-a-vote got the advantage; only Brad chose the steal-a-vote. At Luvu, Naseer proposed blindsiding Danny, but that turned Sydney against him for strategizing too much.: Immunity/Reward Challenge: Tribe members must cross a rope bridge over the water one-by-one, then dig up a large bag of sandbags from a sand pit on the beach. Once retrieved, they had to toss the sandbags onto overhead platforms. The first two tribes to successfully land all five sandbags won immunity plus fruit. The losing tribe had to forfeit their flint until the next immunity challenge.; Brad said his secret phrase before the challenge started, but no one on Luvu had yet found the idol. Luvu and Yase won the challenge. JD and Ricard agreed to vote out Brad, while Genie targeted JD. Brad lost his vote due to Luvu’s idol being undiscovered. Shan was the swing vote; at Tribal Council, she sided with JD and Ricard to blindside Brad with two advantages in his pocket.
600	4	"They Hate Me Because They Ain't Me"	0.9/7	October 13, 2021	5.67
Tensions grew between Genie and the rest of the Ua tribe after they left her out of Brad’s elimination, with Genie declaring she would no longer provide for the rest of the tribe.: Reward Challenge: Tribe members tossed a ball onto an overhead track, then maneuvered through a rope obstacle to catch the ball before it hit the ground. Once all four balls are retrieved, tribes had to toss them onto a high, narrow beam. The first tribe to finish won a visit with a local survivalist, and the second tribe to finish won a fish to share.; Ua and Yase cruised to an easy victory while Heather struggled for Luvu in the challenge. An emotional Heather was consoled by her tribemates and Jeff after the challenge. The four Yase members enjoyed their fish reward and witnessed baby turtles moving to the ocean, while at Luvu, Erika proposed voting out Sydney to Deshawn. However, Deshawn, aligned with Sydney and Danny, revealed to them that he was contemplating throwing the challenge to blindside Erika.: Immunity Challenge: Tribes swam to shore with a heavy bag of blocks, which they untied on the beach. They used the blocks to push out smaller blocks through a tunnel, one of which had a key to a chest that had three rings. The first two tribes to toss all three rings onto hooks won immunity; the losing tribe had to forfeit their flint until the next immunity challenge.; Despite Deshawn and Danny’s efforts to throw the challenge, they placed second with Yase coming in first. The alliance of JD-Ricard-Shan initially planned to stay strong and vote out Genie, but Shan got an idea to convince JD to again give her his extra vote for Tribal Council by acting paranoid, putting her and Ricard in the middle. At Tribal Council, they sided with Genie to send JD out of the game.
601	5	"The Strategist or The Loyalist"	1.0/7	October 20, 2021	5.62
Genie found a new "Beware" idol and immediately showed Ricard and Shan to use as a group idol for the merge, but Shan had her keep it concealed and hidden so that she could secretly make a fake idol and obtain the real one for herself. She would say the phrase to see if anyone from Luvu had found their idol and would keep the idol hidden so that she could still vote. She also gave her extra vote to Ricard in case it wouldn't need to be used yet. At Luvu, Deshawn and Danny tried to recruit a reluctant Naseer to help them throw the next immunity challenge to vote out Erika, while at Yase, Tiffany and Liana searched Xander's bag and discovered his extra vote on top of his idol.: Immunity/Reward Challenge: Tribes worked together to get all three members over a net, then one member would unspool a key from three knotted ropes. The key unlocked a machete that would chop a rope, releasing sandbags. The sandbags would be used in a slingshot to knock over two distant targets. The first two tribes to knock over both targets won immunity; the first tribe to finish also won a larger tarp, while the second tribe to finish won a smaller tarp. The losing tribe had to forfeit their flint until the next immunity challenge.; Naseer said Luvu's secret phrase, having found the tribe's idol the day before, putting all three idols in power. Yase placed first and Luvu stayed undefeated to place second. Yase sent Shan to the summit and Liana volunteered to join her. They bonded and agreed to work together, with Shan telling Liana that if she were to be voted out that night, Ricard (her closest ally) could not be trusted as he would have voted her out with Genie. Shan also told Liana to risk her vote, as Shan would protect her own vote. Liana discovered a new advantage called "Knowledge Is Power"; she could ask only one tribemate if they had an advantage or idol, and if they did, she could take the advantage for herself. Upon returning to Ua, Shan asked Ricard for her extra vote back, but Ricard came to believe she would blindside him, leading to a disagreement. At Tribal Council, Shan was once again the swing vote, debating between voting out her closest ally Ricard for his strategic prowess or voting out the more loyal Genie. She ultimately stayed true to her day-one alliance partner to eliminate Genie from the game.
602	6	"Ready to Play Like a Lion"	0.8/7	October 27, 2021	5.32
Shan and Ricard continued to argue about who was to hold onto the extra vote, though Ricard ultimately gave it back to Shan the morning after Genie's elimination. All three tribes received treemail hinting at a merge, but when they convened, Jeff stated everyone had to earn their way into the merge.: Immunity/Reward Challenge: In teams of five chosen by random draw, castaways removed a large, heavy boulder from the sand, then maneuvered it across various obstacles to ultimately retrieve a key. Teammates then worked together to scale a tower and unlock puzzle pieces. The first team to solve the puzzle won a feast, immunity from the first merged Tribal Council, and the right to choose one of the two castaways who drew a rock that didn't match either team color to join them.; Naseer and Erika drew the odd rocks, and the team of Danny, Deshawn, Evvie, Ricard, and Sydney won the challenge; they chose Naseer to join them. Following the feast, Danny, Deshawn, Liana, and Shan made a final four deal. For not being chosen, Erika was sent to Exile Island with meager supplies and was visited by Jeff, who informed her of a choice she had to make. She could either let the game continue as is, or "go back in time" and transfer the winning team's immunity to the other castaways and herself by smashing an hourglass Jeff provided to her.
603	7	"There's Gonna Be Blood"	1.0/7	November 3, 2021	5.47
Erika rejoined her tribemates the next morning at the first individual immunity challenge and revealed she chose to smash the hourglass, taking immunity away from the winning team and giving it to herself, Heather, Liana, Shan, Tiffany, and Xander.: Immunity Challenge: The non-immune castaways had to build a block structure and place a flag in the center using only their feet. The first to accomplish this won immunity.; Ricard barely beat Evvie and Sydney to win immunity. Upon returning to camp, Liana turned against her old Yase tribemates, and Evvie was targeted by a majority of the tribe for being the biggest perceived threat from the Yase three. Those three targeted Deshawn for similar reasons, and Deshawn's paranoia led him to suggest voting out his longtime ally Sydney as a backup option. At Tribal Council, Liana used her Knowledge Is Power advantage to ask Xander if he had an idol, but he had secretly given that and his extra vote to Tiffany for safekeeping, rendering Liana's advantage useless. After some last-second scrambling among the castaways, Deshawn discovered his extra vote from his summit visit, using it to cast two votes against Evvie, and Sydney took her Shot in the Dark (which turned out to be unsuccessful). Tiffany prepared to play Xander's idol for Evvie, but Xander talked her out of it. In the end, it wouldn't be needed as Luvu turned on their own, sending Sydney home over Evvie.
604	8	"Betraydar"	1.0/7	November 10, 2021	5.56
Now fully merged as Viakana, the tribe saw three of its members, the former Yase alliance, plead their case separately to their new tribemates, but Deshawn remained unwilling to work with them as they voted for him the night before.: Reward Challenge: The tribe was divided into two teams of five by random draw, with one castaway ineligible for reward. Each team member swam out to a ramp, then dove to release two buoy puzzle pieces. They then pulled a boat to a platform, where they used the puzzle pieces to build a pyramid. The first team to finish their pyramid won grilled cheese sandwiches and chips.; Erika drew the odd rock again, but Xander offered to sit out in her place. He searched the sit-out bench for an advantage but was unable to find it, and the blue team (Danny, Deshawn, Erika, Evvie, and Ricard) won the challenge. After the feast, Ricard aggravated Shan by eating a piece of a papaya that Naseer collected for the losing tribemates.: Immunity Challenge: Castaways stood on a beam with a block over their head. If the block fell or they stepped off, they were out. The last one left standing won immunity.; Jeff offered the castaways to sit out for a single serving of rice, or enough rice to last three days if seven people stepped out of the challenge. After renegotiating it to five, Shan and Naseer agreed to give up their shot at immunity, but nobody else budged. Xander offered to step down if four castaways took the offer, and Ricard did the same, giving the tribe the rice. Evvie outlasted Heather for immunity. At camp, the majority agreed to split the votes between Xander and Tiffany. Naseer’s name was thrown out as a decoy vote, but his reaction made the majority change that to Heather. Deshawn worried that Naseer was a bigger threat than Xander, but Shan shut that down quickly, offending Deshawn. The plan to make Heather the decoy vote got back to Heather, who confronted Shan and realized that she has been leading to where everyone was voting. At Tribal Council, Heather initiated a live tribal just before voting was to commence, seemingly turning her tribemates against her. During tribal, Shan again frustrated Deshawn after shooting his idea down. In the end, Xander and Naseer opted not to play their idols, and while both of them along with Heather received votes, the majority decided to play it safe as Tiffany was sent to the jury.
605	9	"Who's Who in the Zoo"	0.9/7	November 17, 2021	5.76
Naseer and Heather argued over the latter's attempts to sway the vote onto Naseer at the previous Tribal Council, while Shan set her sights on Erika as an under-the-radar strategist. Deshawn again felt as though Shan was bossing him around.: Immunity/Reward Challenge: The ten remaining castaways drew for two groups of five to each attend Tribal Council to vote off one person: Evvie, Danny, Deshawn, Liana, and Xander made up the blue group, while the yellow group consisted of Erika, Heather, Naseer, Ricard, and Shan. Castaways stood on a narrow perch with their hands on the back of an overhead bar behind them. The last one left standing from each group won immunity, but the last one left standing overall won a stew reward and the right for their group to visit Tribal Council second.; Erika won immunity but dropped out soon afterward, and Xander outlasted Deshawn for immunity. The yellow group was exiled to Ua's camp, where Naseer told Heather she would be the one to go. This prompted Erika to approach Ricard and Shan about blindsiding Naseer and flushing his idol while he felt comfortable; Ricard was more willing to join Erika than Shan was. At yellow's Tribal Council, Heather acted as though she would be voted out, and Naseer didn't play his idol. Shan used her extra vote to cast one each against Heather and Naseer, resulting in a 3-3 tie that led to a revote, in which Naseer was unanimously sent to the jury. With the blue group, Danny, Deshawn, and Liana targeted Evvie as the only non-immune tribemate outside their alliance, but Deshawn considered flipping to Evvie and Xander to blindside Liana. However, at blue's Tribal Council, Deshawn stuck with his allies to send Evvie to the jury.
606	10	"Baby with a Machine Gun"	1.0/8	November 24, 2021	5.54
The following morning, Deshawn and Shan reconciled and affirmed their intent to reach the end of the game together.: Reward Challenge: Starting on platforms in the middle of the ocean, castaways traversed a series of obstacles, maneuvering a rope along with them on their way back to shore. At the end of the course, they solved a star-shaped puzzle. The first castaway to complete their puzzle won pizza and a night at a Survivor sanctuary.; Ricard won and chose to share the reward with Shan, Heather, and Xander. At camp, Danny and Deshawn contemplated blindsiding Ricard due to his close partnership with Shan.: Immunity Challenge: Castaways stood on narrow beams with three sections, each section narrower than the last. The castaways had to balance a ball on a wooden disc, and at regular intervals, they had to step onto a more narrow section of the beam, and move their hand further down the disc's handle. If the ball dropped or they fell off their beam, they were out. The last castaway standing won immunity.; Ricard beat out Xander to win the challenge, forcing the majority to come up with a new plan. Ricard and Shan agreed that they would have to cut ties to benefit their own strategic games, and the former met with Erika on splitting the vote between Shan and Liana. Those two voted against Erika at Tribal Council, but the rest of the tribe followed through with their split-vote plan, causing a tie between Shan and Liana. On the revote, Shan was unanimously sent to the jury, her idol having gone unplayed.
607	11	"Do or Die"	0.9/7	December 1, 2021	5.63
Both Liana and Deshawn were upset following Tribal Council, the former for her closest ally being blindsided and the latter for being called a snake by Shan upon her exit. The four outside the alliance of Danny-Deshawn-Liana agreed to align. The next morning, Danny confided in Deshawn about the passing of his father 25 years earlier and how he has slowly been letting go of the negative emotions surrounding it.: Immunity Challenge: Castaways balanced a ball on a cylinder and held it in place with two wooden handles on each side. At regular intervals, more cylinders would be added. The last person left standing with their ball intact won immunity. The first person to fall out of the challenge would be forced to participate in a game of chance called Do or Die, which could eliminate them from the game without voting. Castaways could opt out of the challenge and be safe from Do or Die, but would not be immune from the potential vote.; Heather and Liana chose not to participate, and Deshawn immediately fell out first. After Erika dropped, Ricard and Xander were eliminated within milliseconds of each other, giving Danny the win. In case Deshawn became safe from Do or Die, the new majority targeted Liana as the only non-immune player from that alliance while the other three targeted Ricard as the biggest perceived threat. However, Erika privately considered flipping to blindside Ricard. At Tribal Council, Deshawn became emotional over his vote against Shan, leading to a healthy discussion about racial equality among the tribe. Deshawn had a 1-in-3 chance at safety, and he chose the correct box to become immune from the vote. Ultimately, Erika stayed with her alliance and Xander used his extra vote, sending Liana to the jury.
608	12	"Truth Kamikaze"	0.9/7	December 8, 2021	5.70
Xander and Danny agreed that Ricard was their biggest threat, while Deshawn talked with Erika about an alliance.: Reward Challenge: Divided into two teams of three, one teammate dove into the water to release buoys. All three would collect one each of three buoys that looked lighter than the others. Once all three teammates are across, they would shoot the buoys into netted targets. The first team to land all three buoys won their choice of chicken and vegetables or sweets.; The team of Deshawn, Erika, and Xander won the challenge and chose the protein. They discussed going to the final three together due to their differing styles of gameplay, with Deshawn trying to convince Erika that her and Heather's games would be seen as too similar by the jury. At camp, Danny searched for an idol but came up empty, and Ricard noted his absence from camp.: Immunity Challenge: Castaways would spin around to unspool rope from their waist, then traversed an obstacle course while dizzy. At the end is a word puzzle. The first castaway to solve their puzzle won immunity.; Ricard won his third immunity challenge, thwarting everyone's plans to vote him out. Danny and Deshawn accepted the fact that they would have to turn on each other for safety, but at Tribal Council, Deshawn again attempted to convince Erika to make a move against Heather, causing some tribemates to vote against him instead of Danny. After a 3-3 tie vote, Danny was unanimously sent to the jury on the revote. After Danny left, Probst told the final five they would start over on a new island with more meager supplies than before.
609	13	"One Thing Left to Do... Win"	1.0/8	December 15, 2021	5.62
The five finalists were left on a separate island with no shelter and meager supplies, where they withstood a rainy night. They were each given a word scramble puzzle via treemail, which provided a hint to the location of an advantage hidden on the beach. Erika found the advantage, which gave her an advantage in the next immunity challenge.: Immunity/Reward Challenge: Castaways must use a long pole to knock strands of rope off of a bamboo lattice. They must then use said ropes to construct two sets of rope ladders, climb the ladders and solve a 75-piece puzzle. The first castaway to finish the puzzle won immunity and a food reward.; Erika won the challenge, thanks to her advantage that allowed her to start with both of her ladders already partially completed. She was permitted to take one player with her on the food reward; she chose Heather. The consensus was that Ricard was too dangerous to keep in the game, but Xander considered playing his idol for Ricard to make a big move for the jury. However, he elected to play it for himself, and Ricard was unanimously voted out.: Immunity Challenge: Castaways balanced on a curved platform, holding a rope that stabilized a small ledge in front of them. They must assemble a six-piece block tower atop the ledge, moving one block at a time across the platform. The first castaway to complete their block tower and return to the starting position without it falling won immunity.; Xander won the challenge, and the other castaways made their pitches to him for Tribal Council. Deshawn and Heather both stressed that Erika was the biggest threat left in the game, while Erika downplayed her threat level. Xander believed Erika was a strong fire maker and did not want her to get the opportunity to win the fire making challenge, so he elected to take her to Final 3 with him.: Fire Making Challenge: Deshawn and Heather competed in the fire making challenge; Heather had a strong flame early that faltered, allowing Deshawn time to build his own flame and burn through the rope, advancing to the Final 3 seconds before Heather’s own rope burned. Heather became the final member of the jury.; At the Final Tribal Council, jurors questioned Xander’s social awareness; he was criticized for misreading the jury’s perception of Erika and underestimating her gameplay by giving her a free pass to the end. Deshawn’s emotional decision-making was also criticized, with Shan and others lamenting his decision to break up their alliance too early. The final jury vote was 7–1–0, with Danny voting for Deshawn and everyone else voting for Erika, awarding her the $1 million and the title of Sole Survivor. Immediately after the final vote reading, the jury and the finalists discuss the season with host Jeff Probst in the "Survivor After Show".

== Voting history ==
Survivor 41 voting history
	Original tribes						No tribes		Merged tribe													
Episode	1		2	3	4	5	6/7		8	9					10		11		12		13	
Day	3		5	7	9	11	14		16	17 (Note: On Day 17, a split Tribal Council was held. The castaways were divided into two groups of five; each group went to Tribal Council separately to eliminate one castaway from each.)					19		21		23		24	25
Tribe	Yase	Ua	Yase	Ua	Ua	Ua	None		Viakana	Viakana				Viakana	Viakana		Viakana		Viakana		Viakana	Viakana
Eliminated	Abraham	Sara	Voce	Brad	JD	Genie	Sydney		Tiffany	Tie (Note: The vote resulted in a tie. Per the rules, a second vote was held where the castaways involved in the tie would not vote and the remaining castaways could only vote for those who tied.)		Naseer		Evvie	Tie	Shan	Liana		Tie	Danny	Ricard	Heather
Votes	5–1	4–1–1	3–1	3–1	3–1	2–1	5–4–3		6–2–2–1	3–3		4–0		3–2	3–3–2	6–0	5–3		3–3	4–0	4–1	None (Note: For winning the final Immunity Challenge, Xander had to assign additional immunity to another castaway, with the remaining two competing in a fire-making challenge to determine the third finalist; he gave additional immunity to Erika, and Deshawn defeated Heather in the fire-making challenge.)
Voter	Vote																					Challenge
Erika							Sydney		Tiffany	Naseer		Naseer			Liana	Shan	Liana		Danny	Danny	Ricard	Saved
Deshawn							Evvie	Evvie (Note: This player used an extra vote advantage, allowing them to cast two ballots during a single vote.)	Tiffany					Evvie	Shan	Shan	Ricard		Danny	None (Note: Danny and Deshawn were not eligible to vote in the second round of voting.)	Ricard	Won
Xander	Abraham		None (Note: This player lost a vote attempting to gain an advantage.)				Deshawn		Naseer					Liana	Liana	Shan	Liana	Liana	Deshawn	Danny	Ricard	Immune
Heather							Sydney		Tiffany	Naseer		None (Note: This player was not eligible to vote in the second round of voting.)			Liana	Shan	Liana		Danny	Danny	Ricard	Lost
Ricard		Sara		Brad	JD	Genie	Evvie		Tiffany	Heather		Naseer			Shan	Shan	Liana		Deshawn	Danny	Deshawn	
Danny							Evvie		Xander					Evvie	Shan	Shan	Ricard		Deshawn	None		
Liana	Abraham		Voce				Sydney		Tiffany					Evvie	Erika	None	Ricard					
Shan		Sara		Brad	JD	Genie	Sydney		Tiffany	Heather	Naseer	Naseer	Naseer (Note: The extra vote advantage carried over into the revote, allowing them to cast two ballots once more.)		Erika	None						
Evvie	Abraham		Voce				Deshawn		Heather					Liana								
Naseer							Sydney		Xander	Heather		None										
Tiffany	Abraham		Voce				Deshawn		Heather													
Sydney							None (Note: This player played the Shot in the Dark, and as a result, had to sacrifice that night's vote.)															
Genie		Ricard		JD	JD	Ricard																
JD		Sara		Brad	Genie																	
Brad		Sara		None																		
Voce	Abraham		Tiffany																			
Sara		Brad																				
Abraham	Tiffany																					

Jury vote
Episode	13		
Day	26		
Finalist	Erika	Deshawn	Xander
Votes	7–1–0		
Juror	Vote		
Heather	Yes		
Ricard	Yes		
Danny		Yes	
Liana	Yes		
Shan	Yes		
Evvie	Yes		
Naseer	Yes		
Tiffany	Yes		

== Production ==
=== Development ===
Production and broadcast of season 41 was impacted by the COVID-19 pandemic. The season was filmed in Fiji, the ninth consecutive season at that location. It was planned for filming to take place from March to May 2020, with the season scheduled to air on CBS starting in September 2020 as a part of the 2020–21 television season. Worldwide travel restrictions and Fiji's border closures forced production to postpone to a year later, starting filming in March 2021. The broadcast was pushed into the 2021–22 television season.

This season was originally to be entitled Survivor: Dawn of a New Era according to Jeff Probst. Although production and filming were initially scheduled for March 24, 2020 to May 1, 2020 with a standard 39 days of gameplay, they were pushed back until 2021 due to international travel restrictions related to the COVID-19 pandemic. Usually the show releases two seasons per television season year—one debuting around the fall (September) and the other debuting around late winter/early spring (February or March). However, due to the pandemic, the Survivor crew was not able to produce both season 41 and the subsequent 42nd season in 2020. Production had considered filming domestically in Georgia or Hawaii, but the unpredictability of the pandemic pushed filming back to 2021. On February 11, 2021, Faiyaz Koya, the Fijian Minister of Commerce, Trade, Tourism and Transport, approved filming for this season with the crew required to arrive in groups and quarantine before filming. On March 22, 2021, Jeff Probst announced on-location that production of this season was set to start and filming finally began on April 15. The forty-first season debuted in September 2021.

Unlike most Survivor seasons, it is a shortened season spanning only 26 of the usual 39 days due to the COVID-19 pandemic, which required all cast and production members to quarantine for 14 days, taking up some of the short production time. For the first time since Survivor: Borneo, the season's winner was revealed during the final Tribal Council, as production was unsure of its ability to have a live finale due to concerns of a potential COVID-19 resurgence. The vote reveal was then followed by a Survivor After Show special with the final players and the jury instead of a live reunion.

This was the first Survivor season to impose a significant change in the personal safety protocols following allegations of "inappropriate touching" against a contestant during the filming of Island of the Idols in 2019.

=== Gameplay ===
This season introduced many new twists, including the "Shot in the Dark" which offered players at Tribal Council a chance for immunity in exchange for giving up one's vote, the "Beware Advantage" which restricted players' ability to vote until their immunity idols became active, and decision games which forced players to make game-altering choices. One such decision game featured players making opposing—but not necessarily different—choices to either risk or protect their votes in a manner similar to a game of Chicken. Other games of decision included the "Hourglass" twist which gave one player the opportunity to reverse the outcome of a group immunity challenge at the risk of earning tribemates' ire, and the "Do or Die" twist which, in one instance, made the first player to lose an Immunity Challenge perform a risky game of chance similar to the Monty Hall problem just to be able to stay in the game.

According to Jeff Probst, a planned expansion of the Fire Tokens element featured in Winners at War was scrapped after David vs. Goliath runner-up Mike White expressed disapproval of the idea.

In addition, Probst announced a new interactive element called The Game Within the Game, in which children watching at home were invited to play along with the show, solving a rebus puzzle hidden somewhere within the episode. Also, at-home viewers could solve a word-scramble puzzle online and be given a strategy discussion test in which the viewers could discuss the strategy and later compare it with what really happened during the next episode's airing.

== Reception ==
The season received a mixed response, with many praising the cast and their gameplay as well as the entertaining episodes and unpredictability of the season and Erika’s win, but criticizing the overabundance of twists and advantages as well as the overall edit and new format of the season. Dalton Ross of Entertainment Weekly ranked this season 21st out of 41. Gordon Holmes of Xfinity called it a mid-level season, saying, "I think I'll remember this season as having an awesome diverse cast, that was somewhat overshadowed by the need to cram 20 pounds of advantages into a 10-pound bag." Andy Dehnart of reality blurred praised the cast but was highly critical about the overabundance of twists and advantages. Outlets including TVLine, Insider, and Screen Rant expressed similar criticisms regarding the number of twists in this season. Harper Lambert of TheWrap was more critical of the cast due to a "near-total lack of conflict and striking personalities." Riley McAtee of The Ringer was more positive about the season due to the fewer number of twists after the merge, saying that it was "against all odds, given the changes to the format–a pretty good season of Survivor." In 2024, Nick Caruso of TVLine ranked this season 32nd out of 47.

== Viewing figures ==
=== United States ===
Viewership and ratings per episode of Survivor 41
No.	Title	Air date	Rating/share (18–49)	Viewers (millions)	DVR (18–49)	DVR viewers (millions)	Total (18–49)	Total viewers (millions)	Ref.
1	"A New Era"	September 22, 2021	1.1/8	6.25	0.5	2.34	1.6	8.59	
2	"Juggling Chainsaws"	September 29, 2021	1.0/8	5.90	0.4	1.87	1.4	7.77	
3	"My Million Dollar Mistake"	October 6, 2021	0.9/7	5.79	0.5	2.01	1.4	7.78	
4	"They Hate Me Because They Ain't Me"	October 13, 2021	0.9/7	5.67	0.4	1.88	1.4	7.56	
5	"The Strategist or the Loyalist"	October 20, 2021	1.0/7	5.62	0.4	1.91	1.4	7.54	
6	"Ready to Play Like a Lion"	October 27, 2021	0.8/7	5.32	0.4	1.89	1.2	7.21	
7	"There's Gonna Be Blood"	November 3, 2021	1.0/7	5.47	0.4	1.85	1.4	7.32	
8	"Betraydar"	November 10, 2021	1.0/7	5.56	0.4	1.86	1.3	7.35	
9	"Who's Who in the Zoo"	November 17, 2021	0.9/7	5.77	0.4	1.72	1.3	7.49	
10	"Baby With a Machine Gun"	November 24, 2021	1.0/8	5.54	0.5	2.05	1.5	7.60	
11	"Do or Die"	December 1, 2021	0.9/7	5.63	0.3	1.51	1.2	7.14	
12	"Truth Kamikaze"	December 8, 2021	0.9/7	5.70	0.4	1.87	1.3	7.57	
13	"One Thing Left to Do... Win"	December 15, 2021	1.0/8	5.62	0.3	1.82	1.3	7.15	

=== Canada ===
Canadian ratings include 7 day playback.

No.	Air date	Total viewers (millions)	Rank (week)	Refs
1	September 22, 2021	1.751	2	
2	September 29, 2021	1.730	4	
3	October 6, 2021	1.623	5	
4	October 13, 2021	1.701	4	
5	October 20, 2021	1.656	2	
6	October 27, 2021	1.533	4	
7	November 3, 2021	1.725	3	
8	November 10, 2021	1.607	5	
9	November 17, 2021	1.629	4	
10	November 24, 2021	1.579	3	
11	December 1, 2021	1.562	4	
12	December 8, 2021	1.641	4	
13	December 15, 2021	1.548	3	
