= Charlie Parsons =

British television producer

Charles Andrew Parsons is a British television producer, most known as the creator of the Survivor franchise, one of the most successful television franchises of the 21st century. He also created The Big Breakfast and The Word.

== Education ==
Parsons was educated at Tonbridge School in the 1970s, a boarding independent school in Tonbridge, Kent in southeast England. He credits the tough, boarding school regime that was commonplace in boarding schools at the time as providing an inspiration for his creation of the series Survivor. He then went to Pembroke College at the University of Oxford, where he studied English literature, and afterwards trained as a journalist.

== Life and career ==
Parsons trained as a newspaper journalist before working in television at London Weekend Television on programmes including Network 7, which won a BAFTA award for originality. Parsons co-founded the production company Planet 24 with Bob Geldof and his then-partner Waheed Alli. At Planet 24, Parsons created ambitious groundbreaking television programmes including The Big Breakfast, a show described as woven into Britain's tv history,The Word, and the BBC's first programme aimed at the LGBTQ+ community, GaytimeTV. While there, he developed Survivor, which he originally couldn't sell in the UK or the US. It was only when he sold it in 1996 as Expedition Robinson to Sweden and the 1997 season became Sweden's most watched TV show, that he was able to sell it globally as Survivor. Planet 24 was sold to Carlton Communications in March 1999, but the owners kept the rights to Survivor. Charlie Parsons is currently the executive producer of the American version of Survivor, going into its 50th season on CBS. Survivor in the United States premiered on May 31, 2000, building its audience to 52 million viewers, putting it second to the Super Bowl. The show is one of television's biggest hits and has been described as one of the defining shows of our time: "Baseball may have had the 20th century, but in the 21st, whether you watched it or not, 'Survivor' was America's pastime." The New York Times

Parsons has now become a theatre producer, developing and producing shows for the stage through his company Runaway Entertainment with Olivier award-winning producer Tristan Baker. The Bob Dylan musical Girl from the North Country won Olivier and Tony Awards. He also produced 2:22 A Ghost Story, with the premiere run in 2021 starring Lily Allen, which inspired Allen's album West End Girl.

Most recently he produced The Hunger Games on Stage, which took place in a purpose built theatre in Canary Wharf built by his company Troubadour Theatres.

Parsons founded The Great BBC Campaign, set up to provide a bold ambitious new mandate for the BBC, designed to build on the success of the impartial and independent broadcasting organisation.
