= List of Survivor (American TV series) episodes =

Survivor is an American reality television show, a derivative of the Swedish program, Expedition Robinson. It is broadcast on CBS and hosted by Jeff Probst.

The first season, Survivor: Borneo, premiered on May 31, 2000 as part of the summer 2000 primetime scheduling cycle, and it has been aired semiannually since 2001. As of May 20, 2026, 732 episodes of Survivor have aired, including six specials, currently in its fiftieth season. On January 22, 2026, ahead of the season 50 premiere, the show was renewed for a 51st season.

- Seasons: 1
- 2
- 3
- 4
- 5
- 6
- 7
- 8
- 9
- 10
- 11
- 12
- 13
- 14
- 15
- 16
- 17
- 18
- 19
- 20
- 21
- 22
- 23
- 24
- 25
- 26
- 27
- 28
- 29
- 30
- 31
- 32
- 33
- 34
- 35
- 36
- 37
- 38
- 39
- 40
- 41
- 42
- 43
- 44
- 45
- 46
- 47
- 48
- 49
- 50
- 51
- Specials
- References
- External links

== Series overview ==
Season	Subtitle	Location	Original Tribes	Grand Prize	Episodes	Originally released		Winner	Runner(s)–up	2nd Runner-up	Final vote
Season	Subtitle	Location	Original Tribes	Grand Prize	Episodes	First released	Last released	Winner	Runner(s)–up	2nd Runner-up	Final vote
1	Borneo	Pulau Tiga, Sabah, Malaysia	Two tribes of eight new players	$1,000,000 (Note: For Borneo–Panama and In the Hands of the Fans, the winner also received a car as part of the grand prize.)	14	May 31, 2000	August 23, 2000	Richard Hatch	Kelly Wiglesworth	—N/a	4–3
2	The Australian Outback	Herbert River at Goshen Station, Queensland, Australia	Two tribes of eight new players	$1,000,000	16	January 28, 2001	May 3, 2001	Tina Wesson	Colby Donaldson	—N/a	4–3
3	Africa	Shaba National Reserve, Kenya	Two tribes of eight new players	$1,000,000	15	October 11, 2001	January 10, 2002	Ethan Zohn	Kim Johnson	—N/a	5–2
4	Marquesas	Nuku Hiva, Marquesas Islands, French Polynesia	Two tribes of eight new players	$1,000,000	15	February 28, 2002	May 19, 2002	Vecepia Towery	Neleh Dennis	—N/a	4–3
5	Thailand	Ko Tarutao, Satun Province, Thailand	Two tribes of eight new players; picked by the two oldest players	$1,000,000	15	September 19, 2002	December 19, 2002	Brian Heidik	Clay Jordan	—N/a	4–3
6	The Amazon	Rio Negro, Amazonas, Brazil	Two tribes of eight new players divided by gender	$1,000,000	15	February 13, 2003	May 11, 2003	Jenna Morasca	Matthew Von Ertfelda	—N/a	6–1
7	Pearl Islands	Pearl Islands, Panama	Two tribes of eight new players	$1,000,000	15	September 18, 2003	December 14, 2003	Sandra Diaz-Twine	Lillian Morris	—N/a	6–1
8	All-Stars	Pearl Islands, Panama	Three tribes of six returning players	$1,000,000	17	February 1, 2004	May 9, 2004	Amber Brkich	Rob Mariano	—N/a	4–3
9	Vanuatu	Efate, Shefa, Vanuatu	Two tribes of nine new players divided by gender	$1,000,000	15	September 16, 2004	December 12, 2004	Chris Daugherty	Twila Tanner	—N/a	5–2
10	Palau	Koror, Palau	A schoolyard pick of two tribes of nine new players each; two eliminated without a tribe	$1,000,000	15	February 17, 2005	May 15, 2005	Tom Westman	Katie Gallagher	—N/a	6–1
11	Guatemala	Petén, Guatemala	Two tribes of nine, including two returning players	$1,000,000	15	September 15, 2005	December 11, 2005	Danni Boatwright	Stephenie LaGrossa	—N/a	6–1
12	Panama	Pearl Islands, Panama	Four tribes of four new players divided by age and gender	$1,000,000	16	February 2, 2006	May 14, 2006	Aras Baskauskas	Danielle DiLorenzo	—N/a	5–2
13	Cook Islands	Aitutaki, Cook Islands	Four tribes of five new players divided by ethnicity: African Americans, Whites, Hispanics, and Asians	$1,000,000	16	September 14, 2006	December 17, 2006	Yul Kwon	Ozzy Lusth	Becky Lee	5–4–0
14	Fiji	Macuata, Vanua Levu, Fiji	Two tribes of nine new players divided by one selected castaway, who would replace the first person voted out	$1,000,000	15	February 8, 2007	May 13, 2007	Earl Cole	Cassandra Franklin & Andria "Dreamz" Herd	—N/a	9–0–0
15	China	Zhelin, Jiujiang, Jiangxi, China	Two tribes of eight new players	$1,000,000	15	September 20, 2007	December 16, 2007	Todd Herzog	Courtney Yates	Amanda Kimmel	4–2–1
16	Micronesia	Koror, Palau	Two tribes of ten: new players against past contestants	$1,000,000	15	February 7, 2008	May 11, 2008	Parvati Shallow	Amanda Kimmel	—N/a	5–3
17	Gabon	Estuaire, Gabon	A schoolyard pick of two tribes of nine new players, starting with the oldest players	$1,000,000	14	September 25, 2008	December 14, 2008	Robert "Bob" Crowley	Susie Smith	Jessica "Sugar" Kiper	4–3–0
18	Tocantins	Jalapão, Tocantins, Brazil	Two tribes of eight new players	$1,000,000	15	February 12, 2009	May 17, 2009	James "J.T." Thomas Jr.	Stephen Fishbach	—N/a	7–0
19	Samoa	Upolu, Samoa	Two tribes of ten new players	$1,000,000	16	September 17, 2009	December 20, 2009	Natalie White	Russell Hantz	Mick Trimming	7–2–0
20	Heroes vs. Villains	Upolu, Samoa	Two tribes of ten returning players divided by reputation: "heroes" vs. "villains"	$1,000,000	15	February 11, 2010	May 16, 2010	Sandra Diaz-Twine	Parvati Shallow	Russell Hantz	6–3–0
21	Nicaragua	San Juan del Sur, Rivas, Nicaragua	Two tribes of ten new players divided by age	$1,000,000	16	September 15, 2010	December 19, 2010	Jud "Fabio" Birza	Chase Rice	Matthew "Sash" Lenahan	5–4–0
22	Redemption Island	San Juan del Sur, Rivas, Nicaragua	Two tribes of nine, including two returning players	$1,000,000	15	February 16, 2011	May 15, 2011	Rob Mariano	Phillip Sheppard	Natalie Tenerelli	8–1–0
23	South Pacific	Upolu, Samoa	Two tribes of nine, including two returning players	$1,000,000	16	September 14, 2011	December 18, 2011	Sophie Clarke	Benjamin "Coach" Wade	Albert Destrade	6–3–0
24	One World	Upolu, Samoa	Two tribes of nine new players divided by gender living on the same beach	$1,000,000	15	February 15, 2012	May 13, 2012	Kim Spradlin	Sabrina Thompson	Chelsea Meissner	7–2–0
25	Philippines	Caramoan, Camarines Sur, Philippines	Three tribes of six players, including three returning players who had been medically evacuated in a previous season	$1,000,000	15	September 19, 2012	December 16, 2012	Denise Stapley	Michael Skupin & Lisa Whelchel	—N/a	6–1–1
26	Caramoan	Caramoan, Camarines Sur, Philippines	Two tribes of ten: new players against past contestants	$1,000,000	15	February 13, 2013	May 12, 2013	John Cochran	Sherri Biethman & Dawn Meehan	—N/a	8–0–0
27	Blood vs. Water	Palaui Island, Santa Ana, Cagayan, Philippines	Two tribes of ten: returning contestants against their loved ones	$1,000,000	15	September 18, 2013	December 15, 2013	Tyson Apostol	Monica Culpepper	Gervase Peterson	7–1–0
28	Cagayan	Palaui Island, Santa Ana, Cagayan, Philippines	Three tribes of six new players divided by primary attribute: "brawn" vs. "brains" vs. "beauty"	$1,000,000	14	February 26, 2014	May 21, 2014	Tony Vlachos	Yung "Woo" Hwang	—N/a	8–1
29	San Juan del Sur	San Juan del Sur, Rivas, Nicaragua	Nine pairs of new players, each with a pre-existing relationship, divided into two tribes of nine	$1,000,000	15	September 24, 2014	December 17, 2014	Natalie Anderson	Jaclyn Schultz	Missy Payne	5–2–1
30	Worlds Apart	San Juan del Sur, Rivas, Nicaragua	Three tribes of six new players divided by social class: "white collar" vs. "blue collar" vs. "no collar"	$1,000,000	15	February 25, 2015	May 20, 2015	Mike Holloway	Carolyn Rivera & Will Sims II	—N/a	6–1–1
31	Cambodia	Koh Rong, Cambodia	Two tribes of ten returning players who only played once before, have not won, and were selected by public vote	$1,000,000	15	September 23, 2015	December 16, 2015	Jeremy Collins	Spencer Bledsoe & Tasha Fox	—N/a	10–0–0
32	Kaôh Rōng	Koh Rong, Cambodia	Three tribes of six new players divided by primary attribute: "brains" vs. "brawn" vs. "beauty"	$1,000,000	15	February 17, 2016	May 18, 2016	Michele Fitzgerald	Aubry Bracco	Tai Trang	5–2–0
33	Millennials vs. Gen X	Mamanuca Islands, Fiji	Two tribes of ten new players divided by generation: Millennials vs. Generation X	$1,000,000	14	September 21, 2016	December 14, 2016	Adam Klein	Ken McNickle & Hannah Shapiro	—N/a	10–0–0
34	Game Changers	Mamanuca Islands, Fiji	Two tribes of ten returning players	$1,000,000	13	March 8, 2017	May 24, 2017	Sarah Lacina	Brad Culpepper	Troy "Troyzan" Robertson	7–3–0
35	Heroes vs. Healers vs. Hustlers	Mamanuca Islands, Fiji	Three tribes of six new players divided by dominant perceived trait: "heroes" vs. "healers" vs. "hustlers	$1,000,000	14	September 27, 2017	December 20, 2017	Ben Driebergen	Chrissy Hofbeck	Ryan Ulrich	5–2–1
36	Ghost Island	Mamanuca Islands, Fiji	Two tribes of ten new players	$1,000,000	14	February 28, 2018	May 23, 2018	Wendell Holland	Domenick Abbate	Laurel Johnson	5–5–0; 1–0 (Note: The final vote was initially tied for Holland and Abbate. Johnson, who received no votes, was then tasked with casting the final tie-breaking vote.)
37	David vs. Goliath	Mamanuca Islands, Fiji	Two tribes of ten new players divided by adversity: "David" (underdogs) vs. "Goliath"	$1,000,000	14	September 26, 2018	December 19, 2018	Nick Wilson	Mike White	Angelina Keeley	7–3–0
38	Edge of Extinction	Mamanuca Islands, Fiji	Two tribes of nine, including four returning players	$1,000,000	14	February 20, 2019	May 15, 2019	Chris Underwood	Gavin Whitson	Julie Rosenberg	9–4–0
39	Island of the Idols	Mamanuca Islands, Fiji	Two tribes of ten new players. Past winners Rob Mariano and Sandra Diaz-Twine feature as non-playing mentors	$1,000,000	14	September 25, 2019	December 18, 2019	Tommy Sheehan	Dean Kowalski	Noura Salman	8–2–0
40	Winners at War	Mamanuca Islands, Fiji	Two tribes of ten winners of past Survivor seasons	$2,000,000	14	February 12, 2020	May 13, 2020	Tony Vlachos	Natalie Anderson	Michele Fitzgerald	12–4–0
41	—N/a (Note: No subtitle was used in promotion of the season. Instead, the show began following a number format similar to Big Brother and The Amazing Race.)	Mamanuca Islands, Fiji	Three tribes of six new players	$1,000,000	13	September 22, 2021	December 15, 2021	Erika Casupanan	Deshawn Radden	Xander Hastings	7–1–0
42	—N/a	Mamanuca Islands, Fiji	Three tribes of six new players	$1,000,000	13	March 9, 2022	May 25, 2022	Maryanne Oketch	Mike Turner	Romeo Escobar	7–1–0
43	—N/a	Mamanuca Islands, Fiji	Three tribes of six new players	$1,000,000	13	September 21, 2022	December 14, 2022	Mike Gabler	Cassidy Clark	Owen Knight	7–1–0
44	—N/a	Mamanuca Islands, Fiji	Three tribes of six new players	$1,000,000	13	March 1, 2023	May 24, 2023	Yamil "Yam Yam" Arocho	Heidi Lagares-Greenblatt	Carolyn Wiger	7–1–0
45	—N/a	Mamanuca Islands, Fiji	Three tribes of six players, including one returning player	$1,000,000	13	September 27, 2023	December 20, 2023	Dee Valladares	Austin Li Coon	Jake O'Kane	5–3–0
46	—N/a	Mamanuca Islands, Fiji	Three tribes of six new players	$1,000,000	13	February 28, 2024	May 22, 2024	Kenzie Petty	Charlie Davis	Ben Katzman	5–3–0
47	—N/a	Mamanuca Islands, Fiji	Three tribes of six new players	$1,000,000	14	September 18, 2024	December 18, 2024	Rachel LaMont	Sam Phalen	Sue Smey	7–1–0
48	—N/a	Mamanuca Islands, Fiji	Three tribes of six new players	$1,000,000	13	February 26, 2025	May 21, 2025	Kyle Fraser	Eva Erickson	Joe Hunter	5–2–1
49	—N/a	Mamanuca Islands, Fiji	Three tribes of six new players	$1,000,000	13	September 24, 2025	December 17, 2025	Savannah Louie	Sophi Balerdi	Sage Ahrens-Nichols	5–2–1
50	In the Hands of the Fans	Mamanuca Islands, Fiji	Three tribes of eight returning players	$2,000,000	13	February 25, 2026	May 20, 2026	Aubry Bracco	Jonathan Young	Joe Hunter	8–3–0
51	—N/a	Mamanuca Islands, Fiji	Two tribes of ten new players with one selected castaway, who would replace the first person voted out	$1,000,000	13	September 23, 2026	TBA	TBA	TBA	TBA	TBA

== Specials ==
No.	Title	Original release date	US viewers (millions)
S–1	"Back from the Outback"	May 10, 2001	16.26
A special episode focuses the castaways from The Australian Outback on their experiences back home after the game.
S–2	"Countdown to Africa"	October 4, 2001	9.90
The preview for the third season of Survivor and the introduction of 16 new contestants.
S–3	"Back from Africa"	January 17, 2002	14.10
The special episode where the castaways from Africa talk about how their lives have changed since competing in the game.
S–4	"America's Tribal Council"	May 13, 2004	19.11
In this live special event, one of the players (Rupert Boneham) from the All-Stars season is awarded a special US$1,000,000 prize, as a result of a vote conducted by viewers. Jeff Probst reports on the players' lives back home. Plus, an announcement of the next Survivor season.
S–5	"Surviving Survivor"	February 4, 2010	8.11
Airing a week before the show's 20th season Survivor: Heroes vs. Villains, this special episode took a look back at the last 10 years of Survivor with new interviews from previous contestants.
S–6	"Survivor at 40: Greatest Moments and Players"	February 5, 2020	3.82
Airing a week before the show's 40th season Survivor: Winners at War, the special includes some of the highlights of the show's previous seasons, including interviews with Christian Hubicki, Donathan Hurley, David Wright, Cirie Fields, Rob Mariano, Amber Mariano, Jeremy Collins, Parvati Shallow, and Ben Driebergen, and a preview of Winners at War.
