= List of Survivor (American TV series) episodes (seasons 41–present) =

Airings of the CBS reality series from 2021 onward

Survivor is an American reality television show, a derivative of the Swedish program, Expedition Robinson. It is broadcast on CBS and hosted by Jeff Probst.

The first season, Survivor: Borneo, premiered on May 31, 2000 as part of the summer 2000 primetime scheduling cycle, and it has been aired semiannually since 2001. As of May 20, 2026, 727 episodes of Survivor have aired, including six specials, currently in its fiftieth season. On January 22, 2026, ahead of the season 50 premiere, the show was renewed for a 51st season.

== Series overview ==
Season	Subtitle	Location	Original Tribes	Grand Prize	Episodes	Originally released		Winner	Runner(s)–up	2nd Runner-up	Final vote
Season	Subtitle	Location	Original Tribes	Grand Prize	Episodes	First released	Last released	Winner	Runner(s)–up	2nd Runner-up	Final vote
1	Borneo	Pulau Tiga, Sabah, Malaysia	Two tribes of eight new players	$1,000,000 (Note: For Borneo–Panama and In the Hands of the Fans, the winner also received a car as part of the grand prize.)	14	May 31, 2000	August 23, 2000	Richard Hatch	Kelly Wiglesworth	—N/a	4–3
2	The Australian Outback	Herbert River at Goshen Station, Queensland, Australia	Two tribes of eight new players	$1,000,000	16	January 28, 2001	May 3, 2001	Tina Wesson	Colby Donaldson	—N/a	4–3
3	Africa	Shaba National Reserve, Kenya	Two tribes of eight new players	$1,000,000	15	October 11, 2001	January 10, 2002	Ethan Zohn	Kim Johnson	—N/a	5–2
4	Marquesas	Nuku Hiva, Marquesas Islands, French Polynesia	Two tribes of eight new players	$1,000,000	15	February 28, 2002	May 19, 2002	Vecepia Towery	Neleh Dennis	—N/a	4–3
5	Thailand	Ko Tarutao, Satun Province, Thailand	Two tribes of eight new players; picked by the two oldest players	$1,000,000	15	September 19, 2002	December 19, 2002	Brian Heidik	Clay Jordan	—N/a	4–3
6	The Amazon	Rio Negro, Amazonas, Brazil	Two tribes of eight new players divided by gender	$1,000,000	15	February 13, 2003	May 11, 2003	Jenna Morasca	Matthew Von Ertfelda	—N/a	6–1
7	Pearl Islands	Pearl Islands, Panama	Two tribes of eight new players	$1,000,000	15	September 18, 2003	December 14, 2003	Sandra Diaz-Twine	Lillian Morris	—N/a	6–1
8	All-Stars	Pearl Islands, Panama	Three tribes of six returning players	$1,000,000	17	February 1, 2004	May 9, 2004	Amber Brkich	Rob Mariano	—N/a	4–3
9	Vanuatu	Efate, Shefa, Vanuatu	Two tribes of nine new players divided by gender	$1,000,000	15	September 16, 2004	December 12, 2004	Chris Daugherty	Twila Tanner	—N/a	5–2
10	Palau	Koror, Palau	A schoolyard pick of two tribes of nine new players each; two eliminated without a tribe	$1,000,000	15	February 17, 2005	May 15, 2005	Tom Westman	Katie Gallagher	—N/a	6–1
11	Guatemala	Petén, Guatemala	Two tribes of nine, including two returning players	$1,000,000	15	September 15, 2005	December 11, 2005	Danni Boatwright	Stephenie LaGrossa	—N/a	6–1
12	Panama	Pearl Islands, Panama	Four tribes of four new players divided by age and gender	$1,000,000	16	February 2, 2006	May 14, 2006	Aras Baskauskas	Danielle DiLorenzo	—N/a	5–2
13	Cook Islands	Aitutaki, Cook Islands	Four tribes of five new players divided by ethnicity: African Americans, Whites, Hispanics, and Asians	$1,000,000	16	September 14, 2006	December 17, 2006	Yul Kwon	Ozzy Lusth	Becky Lee	5–4–0
14	Fiji	Macuata, Vanua Levu, Fiji	Two tribes of nine new players divided by one selected castaway, who would replace the first person voted out	$1,000,000	15	February 8, 2007	May 13, 2007	Earl Cole	Cassandra Franklin & Andria "Dreamz" Herd	—N/a	9–0–0
15	China	Zhelin, Jiujiang, Jiangxi, China	Two tribes of eight new players	$1,000,000	15	September 20, 2007	December 16, 2007	Todd Herzog	Courtney Yates	Amanda Kimmel	4–2–1
16	Micronesia	Koror, Palau	Two tribes of ten: new players against past contestants	$1,000,000	15	February 7, 2008	May 11, 2008	Parvati Shallow	Amanda Kimmel	—N/a	5–3
17	Gabon	Estuaire, Gabon	A schoolyard pick of two tribes of nine new players, starting with the oldest players	$1,000,000	14	September 25, 2008	December 14, 2008	Robert "Bob" Crowley	Susie Smith	Jessica "Sugar" Kiper	4–3–0
18	Tocantins	Jalapão, Tocantins, Brazil	Two tribes of eight new players	$1,000,000	15	February 12, 2009	May 17, 2009	James "J.T." Thomas Jr.	Stephen Fishbach	—N/a	7–0
19	Samoa	Upolu, Samoa	Two tribes of ten new players	$1,000,000	16	September 17, 2009	December 20, 2009	Natalie White	Russell Hantz	Mick Trimming	7–2–0
20	Heroes vs. Villains	Upolu, Samoa	Two tribes of ten returning players divided by reputation: "heroes" vs. "villains"	$1,000,000	15	February 11, 2010	May 16, 2010	Sandra Diaz-Twine	Parvati Shallow	Russell Hantz	6–3–0
21	Nicaragua	San Juan del Sur, Rivas, Nicaragua	Two tribes of ten new players divided by age	$1,000,000	16	September 15, 2010	December 19, 2010	Jud "Fabio" Birza	Chase Rice	Matthew "Sash" Lenahan	5–4–0
22	Redemption Island	San Juan del Sur, Rivas, Nicaragua	Two tribes of nine, including two returning players	$1,000,000	15	February 16, 2011	May 15, 2011	Rob Mariano	Phillip Sheppard	Natalie Tenerelli	8–1–0
23	South Pacific	Upolu, Samoa	Two tribes of nine, including two returning players	$1,000,000	16	September 14, 2011	December 18, 2011	Sophie Clarke	Benjamin "Coach" Wade	Albert Destrade	6–3–0
24	One World	Upolu, Samoa	Two tribes of nine new players divided by gender living on the same beach	$1,000,000	15	February 15, 2012	May 13, 2012	Kim Spradlin	Sabrina Thompson	Chelsea Meissner	7–2–0
25	Philippines	Caramoan, Camarines Sur, Philippines	Three tribes of six players, including three returning players who had been medically evacuated in a previous season	$1,000,000	15	September 19, 2012	December 16, 2012	Denise Stapley	Michael Skupin & Lisa Whelchel	—N/a	6–1–1
26	Caramoan	Caramoan, Camarines Sur, Philippines	Two tribes of ten: new players against past contestants	$1,000,000	15	February 13, 2013	May 12, 2013	John Cochran	Sherri Biethman & Dawn Meehan	—N/a	8–0–0
27	Blood vs. Water	Palaui Island, Santa Ana, Cagayan, Philippines	Two tribes of ten: returning contestants against their loved ones	$1,000,000	15	September 18, 2013	December 15, 2013	Tyson Apostol	Monica Culpepper	Gervase Peterson	7–1–0
28	Cagayan	Palaui Island, Santa Ana, Cagayan, Philippines	Three tribes of six new players divided by primary attribute: "brawn" vs. "brains" vs. "beauty"	$1,000,000	14	February 26, 2014	May 21, 2014	Tony Vlachos	Yung "Woo" Hwang	—N/a	8–1
29	San Juan del Sur	San Juan del Sur, Rivas, Nicaragua	Nine pairs of new players, each with a pre-existing relationship, divided into two tribes of nine	$1,000,000	15	September 24, 2014	December 17, 2014	Natalie Anderson	Jaclyn Schultz	Missy Payne	5–2–1
30	Worlds Apart	San Juan del Sur, Rivas, Nicaragua	Three tribes of six new players divided by social class: "white collar" vs. "blue collar" vs. "no collar"	$1,000,000	15	February 25, 2015	May 20, 2015	Mike Holloway	Carolyn Rivera & Will Sims II	—N/a	6–1–1
31	Cambodia	Koh Rong, Cambodia	Two tribes of ten returning players who only played once before, have not won, and were selected by public vote	$1,000,000	15	September 23, 2015	December 16, 2015	Jeremy Collins	Spencer Bledsoe & Tasha Fox	—N/a	10–0–0
32	Kaôh Rōng	Koh Rong, Cambodia	Three tribes of six new players divided by primary attribute: "brains" vs. "brawn" vs. "beauty"	$1,000,000	15	February 17, 2016	May 18, 2016	Michele Fitzgerald	Aubry Bracco	Tai Trang	5–2–0
33	Millennials vs. Gen X	Mamanuca Islands, Fiji	Two tribes of ten new players divided by generation: Millennials vs. Generation X	$1,000,000	14	September 21, 2016	December 14, 2016	Adam Klein	Ken McNickle & Hannah Shapiro	—N/a	10–0–0
34	Game Changers	Mamanuca Islands, Fiji	Two tribes of ten returning players	$1,000,000	13	March 8, 2017	May 24, 2017	Sarah Lacina	Brad Culpepper	Troy "Troyzan" Robertson	7–3–0
35	Heroes vs. Healers vs. Hustlers	Mamanuca Islands, Fiji	Three tribes of six new players divided by dominant perceived trait: "heroes" vs. "healers" vs. "hustlers	$1,000,000	14	September 27, 2017	December 20, 2017	Ben Driebergen	Chrissy Hofbeck	Ryan Ulrich	5–2–1
36	Ghost Island	Mamanuca Islands, Fiji	Two tribes of ten new players	$1,000,000	14	February 28, 2018	May 23, 2018	Wendell Holland	Domenick Abbate	Laurel Johnson	5–5–0; 1–0 (Note: The final vote was initially tied for Holland and Abbate. Johnson, who received no votes, was then tasked with casting the final tie-breaking vote.)
37	David vs. Goliath	Mamanuca Islands, Fiji	Two tribes of ten new players divided by adversity: "David" (underdogs) vs. "Goliath"	$1,000,000	14	September 26, 2018	December 19, 2018	Nick Wilson	Mike White	Angelina Keeley	7–3–0
38	Edge of Extinction	Mamanuca Islands, Fiji	Two tribes of nine, including four returning players	$1,000,000	14	February 20, 2019	May 15, 2019	Chris Underwood	Gavin Whitson	Julie Rosenberg	9–4–0
39	Island of the Idols	Mamanuca Islands, Fiji	Two tribes of ten new players. Past winners Rob Mariano and Sandra Diaz-Twine feature as non-playing mentors	$1,000,000	14	September 25, 2019	December 18, 2019	Tommy Sheehan	Dean Kowalski	Noura Salman	8–2–0
40	Winners at War	Mamanuca Islands, Fiji	Two tribes of ten winners of past Survivor seasons	$2,000,000	14	February 12, 2020	May 13, 2020	Tony Vlachos	Natalie Anderson	Michele Fitzgerald	12–4–0
41	—N/a (Note: No subtitle was used in promotion of the season. Instead, the show began following a number format similar to Big Brother and The Amazing Race.)	Mamanuca Islands, Fiji	Three tribes of six new players	$1,000,000	13	September 22, 2021	December 15, 2021	Erika Casupanan	Deshawn Radden	Xander Hastings	7–1–0
42	—N/a	Mamanuca Islands, Fiji	Three tribes of six new players	$1,000,000	13	March 9, 2022	May 25, 2022	Maryanne Oketch	Mike Turner	Romeo Escobar	7–1–0
43	—N/a	Mamanuca Islands, Fiji	Three tribes of six new players	$1,000,000	13	September 21, 2022	December 14, 2022	Mike Gabler	Cassidy Clark	Owen Knight	7–1–0
44	—N/a	Mamanuca Islands, Fiji	Three tribes of six new players	$1,000,000	13	March 1, 2023	May 24, 2023	Yamil "Yam Yam" Arocho	Heidi Lagares-Greenblatt	Carolyn Wiger	7–1–0
45	—N/a	Mamanuca Islands, Fiji	Three tribes of six players, including one returning player	$1,000,000	13	September 27, 2023	December 20, 2023	Dee Valladares	Austin Li Coon	Jake O'Kane	5–3–0
46	—N/a	Mamanuca Islands, Fiji	Three tribes of six new players	$1,000,000	13	February 28, 2024	May 22, 2024	Kenzie Petty	Charlie Davis	Ben Katzman	5–3–0
47	—N/a	Mamanuca Islands, Fiji	Three tribes of six new players	$1,000,000	14	September 18, 2024	December 18, 2024	Rachel LaMont	Sam Phalen	Sue Smey	7–1–0
48	—N/a	Mamanuca Islands, Fiji	Three tribes of six new players	$1,000,000	13	February 26, 2025	May 21, 2025	Kyle Fraser	Eva Erickson	Joe Hunter	5–2–1
49	—N/a	Mamanuca Islands, Fiji	Three tribes of six new players	$1,000,000	13	September 24, 2025	December 17, 2025	Savannah Louie	Sophi Balerdi	Sage Ahrens-Nichols	5–2–1
50	In the Hands of the Fans	Mamanuca Islands, Fiji	Three tribes of eight returning players	$2,000,000	13	February 25, 2026	May 20, 2026	Aubry Bracco	Jonathan Young	Joe Hunter	8–3–0
51	—N/a	Mamanuca Islands, Fiji	Two tribes of ten new players divided by one selected castaway, who would replace the first person voted out	$1,000,000	13	September 23, 2026	TBA	TBA	TBA	TBA	TBA

== Episodes ==
=== Survivor 41 (Season 41, 2021) ===
No. overall	No. in season	Title	Rating/share (18-49)	Original release date	U.S. viewers (millions)
597	1	"A New Era"	1.1/8	September 22, 2021	6.25
598	2	"Juggling Chainsaws"	1.0/8	September 29, 2021	5.90
599	3	"My Million Dollar Mistake"	0.9/7	October 6, 2021	5.79
600	4	"They Hate Me Because They Ain't Me"	0.9/7	October 13, 2021	5.67
601	5	"The Strategist or The Loyalist"	1.0/7	October 20, 2021	5.62
602	6	"Ready to Play Like a Lion"	0.8/7	October 27, 2021	5.32
603	7	"There's Gonna Be Blood"	1.0/7	November 3, 2021	5.47
604	8	"Betraydar"	1.0/7	November 10, 2021	5.56
605	9	"Who's Who in the Zoo"	0.9/7	November 17, 2021	5.76
606	10	"Baby with a Machine Gun"	1.0/8	November 24, 2021	5.54
607	11	"Do or Die"	0.9/7	December 1, 2021	5.63
608	12	"Truth Kamikaze"	0.9/7	December 8, 2021	5.70
609	13	"One Thing Left to Do... Win"	1.0/8	December 15, 2021	5.62

=== Survivor 42 (Season 42, 2022) ===
No. overall	No. in season	Title	Rating/share (18–49)	Original release date	U.S. viewers (millions)
610	1	"Feels Like a Rollercoaster"	0.8/7	March 9, 2022	4.96
611	2	"Good and Guilty"	0.8/7	March 16, 2022	5.06
612	3	"Go for the Gusto"	0.8/7	March 23, 2022	5.35
613	4	"Vibe of the Tribe"	0.9/8	March 30, 2022	5.63
614	5	"I'm Survivor Rich"	0.9/8	April 6, 2022	5.58
615	6	"You Can't Hide on Survivor"	0.8/7	April 13, 2022	5.12
616	7	"The Devil You Do or The Devil You Don't"	0.8/7	April 13, 2022	5.12
617	8	"You Better Be Wearing a Seatbelt"	0.9/8	April 20, 2022	5.43
618	9	"Game of Chicken"	0.9/8	April 27, 2022	5.72
619	10	"Tell a Good Lie, Not a Stupid Lie"	0.9/8	May 4, 2022	5.62
620	11	"Battle Royale"	0.8/7	May 11, 2022	5.38
621	12	"Caterpillar to a Butterfly"	0.9/8	May 18, 2022	5.70
622	13	"It Comes Down to This"	0.8/7	May 25, 2022	5.11

=== Survivor 43 (Season 43, 2022) ===
No. overall	No. in season	Title	Rating/share (18–49)	Original release date	U.S. viewers (millions)
623	1	"LIVIN"	0.8/7	September 21, 2022	5.05
624	2	"Lovable Curmudgeon"	0.7/6	September 28, 2022	4.57
625	3	"I'll Sign the Divorce Papers"	0.8/7	October 5, 2022	5.15
626	4	"Show No Mercy"	0.7/6	October 12, 2022	5.03
627	5	"Stop with All the Niceness"	0.7/5	October 19, 2022	4.91
628	6	"Mergatory"	0.8/7	October 26, 2022	5.17
629	7	"Bull in a China Shop"	0.6/5	November 2, 2022	4.64
630	8	"Proposterous"	0.7/6	November 9, 2022	4.73
631	9	"What About the Big Girls"	0.7/6	November 16, 2022	5.15
632	10	"Get That Money, Baby"	0.7/6	November 23, 2022	4.89
633	11	"Hiding in Plain Sight"	0.7/6	November 30, 2022	5.31
634	12	"Telenovela"	0.7/6	December 7, 2022	5.34
635	13	"Snap Some Necks and Cash Some Checks"	0.8/7	December 14, 2022	4.98

=== Survivor 44 (Season 44, 2023) ===
No. overall	No. in season	Title	Rating/share (18–49)	Original release date	U.S. viewers (millions)
636	1	"I Can't Wait to See Jeff"	0.7/6	March 1, 2023	4.76
637	2	"Two Dorky Magnets"	0.7/7	March 8, 2023	4.95
638	3	"Sneaky Little Snake"	0.7/7	March 15, 2023	4.99
639	4	"I'm Felicia"	0.7/7	March 22, 2023	5.19
640	5	"The Third Turd"	0.8/7	March 29, 2023	5.25
641	6	"Survivor with a Capital S"	0.7/7	April 5, 2023	5.19
642	7	"Let's Not Be Cute About It"	0.7/7	April 12, 2023	5.34
643	8	"Don't Get Cocky, Kid"	0.8/7	April 19, 2023	5.29
644	9	"Under the Wing of a Dragon"	0.7/7	April 26, 2023	5.22
645	10	"Full Tilt Boogie"	0.7/6	May 3, 2023	4.96
646	11	"I'm Not Worthy"	0.7/6	May 10, 2023	4.78
647	12	"I’m the Bandit"	0.7/7	May 17, 2023	4.71
648	13	"Absolute Banger Season"	0.7/7	May 24, 2023	4.41

=== Survivor 45 (Season 45, 2023) ===
No. overall	No. in season	Title	Rating/share (18–49)	Original release date	U.S. viewers (millions)
649	1	"We Can Do Hard Things"	0.84/9	September 27, 2023	5.24
650	2	"Brought a Bazooka to a Tea Party"	0.78/9	October 4, 2023	4.88
651	3	"No Man Left Behind"	0.84/9	October 11, 2023	5.09
652	4	"Music to My Ears"	0.77/8	October 18, 2023	4.92
653	5	"I Don't Want to Be the Worm"	0.73/7	October 25, 2023	5.03
654	6	"I'm Not Batman, I'm the Canadian"	0.72/7	November 1, 2023	4.86
655	7	"The Thorn in My Thumb"	0.71/7	November 8, 2023	4.53
656	8	"Following a Dead Horse to Water"	0.77/8	November 15, 2023	5.14
657	9	"Sword of Damocles"	0.85/9	November 22, 2023	4.90
658	10	"How Am I the Mobster?"	0.80/9	November 29, 2023	5.02
659	11	"This Game Rips Your Heart Out"	0.81/9	December 6, 2023	4.84
660	12	"The Ex-Girlfriend at the Wedding"	0.84/9	December 13, 2023	5.33
661	13	"Living the Survivor Dream"	0.84/9	December 20, 2023	4.73

=== Survivor 46 (Season 46, 2024) ===
No. overall	No. in season	Title	Rating/share (18–49)	Original release date	U.S. viewers (millions)
662	1	"This is Where the Legends are Made"	0.83/9	February 28, 2024	4.90
663	2	"Scorpio Energy"	0.61/7	March 6, 2024	4.43
664	3	"Wackadoodles Win"	0.75/9	March 13, 2024	4.78
665	4	"Don't Touch the Oven"	0.78/9	March 20, 2024	4.68
666	5	"Tiki Man"	0.70/8	March 27, 2024	4.72
667	6	"Cancel Christmas"	0.80/9	April 3, 2024	5.05
668	7	"Episode Several"	0.69/8	April 10, 2024	4.64
669	8	"Hide 'N Seek"	0.77/9	April 17, 2024	4.84
670	9	"Spicy Jeff"	0.74/8	April 24, 2024	4.91
671	10	"Run the Red Light"	0.80/9	May 1, 2024	4.79
672	11	"My Messy, Sweet Little Friend"	0.75/8	May 8, 2024	4.69
673	12	"Mamma Bear"	0.75/8	May 15, 2024	4.71
674	13	"Friends Going to War"	0.75/8	May 22, 2024	4.51

=== Survivor 47 (Season 47, 2024) ===
No. overall	No. in season	Title	Rating/share (18–49)	Original release date	U.S. viewers (millions)
675	1	"One Glorious and Perfect Episode"	0.7/10	September 18, 2024	4.72
676	2	"Epic Boss Girl Move"	0.7/9	September 25, 2024	4.47
677	3	"Belly of the Beast"	0.6/8	October 2, 2024	4.34
678	4	"Is That Blood in Your Hair"	0.7/7	October 9, 2024	4.14
679	5	"The Scales Be Tippin"	0.6/7	October 16, 2024	4.02
680	6	"Feel the FOMO"	0.6/8	October 23, 2024	4.35
681	7	"Our Pickle on Blast"	0.6/6	October 30, 2024	4.24
682	8	"He's All That"	0.7/8	November 6, 2024	4.64
683	9	"Nightmare Fuel"	0.7/9	November 13, 2024	4.43
684	10	"Loyal to the Soil"	0.7/9	November 20, 2024	4.42
685	11	"Flipping the Win Switch"	0.7/9	November 27, 2024	4.50
686	12	"Operation: Italy"	0.7/9	December 4, 2024	4.60
687	13	"Bob and Weave"	0.7/9	December 11, 2024	4.89
688	14	"The Last Stand"	0.8/11	December 18, 2024	5.03

=== Survivor 48 (Season 48, 2025) ===
No. overall	No. in season	Title	Rating/share (18–49)	Original release date	U.S. viewers (millions)
689	1	"The Get to Know You Game"	0.7/9	February 26, 2025	4.27
690	2	"Humble Traits"	0.6/8	March 5, 2025	4.31
691	3	"Committing to the Bit"	0.7/9	March 12, 2025	4.63
692	4	"The House Party's Over"	0.8/10	March 19, 2025	4.70
693	5	"Master Class in Deception"	0.7/10	March 26, 2025	4.77
694	6	"Doing the Damn Thing"	0.7/10	April 2, 2025	4.77
695	7	"Survivor Smack Talk"	0.7/9	April 9, 2025	4.89
696	8	"A Rift Between All of Us"	0.8/11	April 16, 2025	4.79
697	9	"Welcome to the Party"	0.6/9	April 23, 2025	4.58
698	10	"My Enemies Are Plottin'"	0.7/9	April 30, 2025	4.59
699	11	"Coconut Etiquette"	0.6/8	May 7, 2025	4.43
700	12	"Icarus Time"	0.8/10	May 14, 2025	4.90
701	13	"Only One of Yous Can Win"	0.7/9	May 21, 2025	4.56

=== Survivor 49 (Season 49, 2025) ===
No. overall	No. in season	Title	Rating/share (18–49)	Original release date	U.S. viewers (millions)
702	1	"Act One of a Horror Film"	0.6/9	September 24, 2025	4.03
703	2	"Cinema"	0.6/8	October 1, 2025	4.03
704	3	"Loveable Losers"	0.6/9	October 8, 2025	4.23
705	4	"Go Kick Rocks, Bro"	0.6/9	October 15, 2025	4.27
706	5	"I'm a Wolf, Baby"	0.7/9	October 22, 2025	4.36
707	6	"The Devil's Shoes"	0.6/8	October 29, 2025	4.25
708	7	"Blood Will Be Drawn"	0.6/9	November 5, 2025	4.37
709	8	"Hot Grim Reaper"	0.5/8	November 12, 2025	3.90
710	9	"If You're Loyal to All, You're Loyal to None"	0.6/9	November 19, 2025	4.17
711	10	"Huge Dose of Bamboozle"	0.6/9	November 26, 2025	4.25
712	11	"Cherry On Top"	0.6/10	December 3, 2025	4.41
713	12	"The Die Is Cast"	0.8/13	December 10, 2025	4.77
714	13	"A Fever Dream"	0.7/9	December 17, 2025	4.45

=== In the Hands of the Fans (Season 50, 2026) ===
No. overall	No. in season	Title	Day(s)	Rating/share (18–49)	Original release date	U.S. viewers (millions)
715	1	"Epic Party"	Days 1–4	0.95/13	February 25, 2026	5.06
716	2	"Therapy Carousel"	Days 4–6	0.94/12	March 4, 2026	4.95
717	3	"Did You Vote For a Swap?"	Days 6–8	0.87/11	March 11, 2026	4.88
718	4	"Knife to the Heart"	Days 8–9	0.96/12	March 18, 2026	5.22
719	5	"Open Wounds"	Days 9–11	0.93/12	March 25, 2026	5.10
720	6	"The Blood Moon"	Days 11–13	0.91/12	April 1, 2026	5.00
721	7	"That's Not How I Play Survivor"	Days 13–15	0.92/12	April 8, 2026	4.91
722	8	"Double the Fun, Double the Demise"	Days 15–16	1.04/15	April 15, 2026	5.06
723	9	"I Deserve All of This"	Days 16–18	0.81/10	April 22, 2026	5.09
724	10	"A Side Dish of Chaos"	Days 18–19	0.89/11	April 29, 2026	4.91
725	11	"Everyone Will Be Shooketh!"	Days 19–21	0.91/11	May 6, 2026	5.16
726	12	"Inconceivable"	Days 21–23	1.00/13	May 13, 2026	5.34
727	13	"Reverse the Curse"	Days 23–26	1.10/13	May 20, 2026	5.68

=== Survivor 51 (Season 51, 2026) ===
No. overall	No. in season	Title	Day(s)	Rating/share (18–49)	Original release date	U.S. viewers (millions)
728	1	"Permanent Uncertainty"	TBA	TBA	September 23, 2026	TBD
