= List of Survivor (American TV series) episodes (seasons 1–20) =

Airings of the CBS reality series from 2000 to 2010

Survivor is an American reality television show, a derivative of the Swedish program, Expedition Robinson. It is broadcast on CBS and hosted by Jeff Probst.

The first season, Survivor: Borneo, premiered on May 31, 2000 as part of the summer 2000 primetime scheduling cycle, and it has been aired semiannually since 2001. As of May 20, 2026, 727 episodes of Survivor have aired, including six specials, currently in its fiftieth season. On January 22, 2026, ahead of the season 50 premiere, the show was renewed for a 51st season.

== Series overview ==
Season	Subtitle	Location	Original Tribes	Grand Prize	Episodes	Originally released		Winner	Runner(s)–up	2nd Runner-up	Final vote
Season	Subtitle	Location	Original Tribes	Grand Prize	Episodes	First released	Last released	Winner	Runner(s)–up	2nd Runner-up	Final vote
1	Borneo	Pulau Tiga, Sabah, Malaysia	Two tribes of eight new players	$1,000,000 (Note: For Borneo–Panama and In the Hands of the Fans, the winner also received a car as part of the grand prize.)	14	May 31, 2000	August 23, 2000	Richard Hatch	Kelly Wiglesworth	—N/a	4–3
2	The Australian Outback	Herbert River at Goshen Station, Queensland, Australia	Two tribes of eight new players	$1,000,000	16	January 28, 2001	May 3, 2001	Tina Wesson	Colby Donaldson	—N/a	4–3
3	Africa	Shaba National Reserve, Kenya	Two tribes of eight new players	$1,000,000	15	October 11, 2001	January 10, 2002	Ethan Zohn	Kim Johnson	—N/a	5–2
4	Marquesas	Nuku Hiva, Marquesas Islands, French Polynesia	Two tribes of eight new players	$1,000,000	15	February 28, 2002	May 19, 2002	Vecepia Towery	Neleh Dennis	—N/a	4–3
5	Thailand	Ko Tarutao, Satun Province, Thailand	Two tribes of eight new players; picked by the two oldest players	$1,000,000	15	September 19, 2002	December 19, 2002	Brian Heidik	Clay Jordan	—N/a	4–3
6	The Amazon	Rio Negro, Amazonas, Brazil	Two tribes of eight new players divided by gender	$1,000,000	15	February 13, 2003	May 11, 2003	Jenna Morasca	Matthew Von Ertfelda	—N/a	6–1
7	Pearl Islands	Pearl Islands, Panama	Two tribes of eight new players	$1,000,000	15	September 18, 2003	December 14, 2003	Sandra Diaz-Twine	Lillian Morris	—N/a	6–1
8	All-Stars	Pearl Islands, Panama	Three tribes of six returning players	$1,000,000	17	February 1, 2004	May 9, 2004	Amber Brkich	Rob Mariano	—N/a	4–3
9	Vanuatu	Efate, Shefa, Vanuatu	Two tribes of nine new players divided by gender	$1,000,000	15	September 16, 2004	December 12, 2004	Chris Daugherty	Twila Tanner	—N/a	5–2
10	Palau	Koror, Palau	A schoolyard pick of two tribes of nine new players each; two eliminated without a tribe	$1,000,000	15	February 17, 2005	May 15, 2005	Tom Westman	Katie Gallagher	—N/a	6–1
11	Guatemala	Petén, Guatemala	Two tribes of nine, including two returning players	$1,000,000	15	September 15, 2005	December 11, 2005	Danni Boatwright	Stephenie LaGrossa	—N/a	6–1
12	Panama	Pearl Islands, Panama	Four tribes of four new players divided by age and gender	$1,000,000	16	February 2, 2006	May 14, 2006	Aras Baskauskas	Danielle DiLorenzo	—N/a	5–2
13	Cook Islands	Aitutaki, Cook Islands	Four tribes of five new players divided by ethnicity: African Americans, Whites, Hispanics, and Asians	$1,000,000	16	September 14, 2006	December 17, 2006	Yul Kwon	Ozzy Lusth	Becky Lee	5–4–0
14	Fiji	Macuata, Vanua Levu, Fiji	Two tribes of nine new players divided by one selected castaway, who would replace the first person voted out	$1,000,000	15	February 8, 2007	May 13, 2007	Earl Cole	Cassandra Franklin & Andria "Dreamz" Herd	—N/a	9–0–0
15	China	Zhelin, Jiujiang, Jiangxi, China	Two tribes of eight new players	$1,000,000	15	September 20, 2007	December 16, 2007	Todd Herzog	Courtney Yates	Amanda Kimmel	4–2–1
16	Micronesia	Koror, Palau	Two tribes of ten: new players against past contestants	$1,000,000	15	February 7, 2008	May 11, 2008	Parvati Shallow	Amanda Kimmel	—N/a	5–3
17	Gabon	Estuaire, Gabon	A schoolyard pick of two tribes of nine new players, starting with the oldest players	$1,000,000	14	September 25, 2008	December 14, 2008	Robert "Bob" Crowley	Susie Smith	Jessica "Sugar" Kiper	4–3–0
18	Tocantins	Jalapão, Tocantins, Brazil	Two tribes of eight new players	$1,000,000	15	February 12, 2009	May 17, 2009	James "J.T." Thomas Jr.	Stephen Fishbach	—N/a	7–0
19	Samoa	Upolu, Samoa	Two tribes of ten new players	$1,000,000	16	September 17, 2009	December 20, 2009	Natalie White	Russell Hantz	Mick Trimming	7–2–0
20	Heroes vs. Villains	Upolu, Samoa	Two tribes of ten returning players divided by reputation: "heroes" vs. "villains"	$1,000,000	15	February 11, 2010	May 16, 2010	Sandra Diaz-Twine	Parvati Shallow	Russell Hantz	6–3–0
21	Nicaragua	San Juan del Sur, Rivas, Nicaragua	Two tribes of ten new players divided by age	$1,000,000	16	September 15, 2010	December 19, 2010	Jud "Fabio" Birza	Chase Rice	Matthew "Sash" Lenahan	5–4–0
22	Redemption Island	San Juan del Sur, Rivas, Nicaragua	Two tribes of nine, including two returning players	$1,000,000	15	February 16, 2011	May 15, 2011	Rob Mariano	Phillip Sheppard	Natalie Tenerelli	8–1–0
23	South Pacific	Upolu, Samoa	Two tribes of nine, including two returning players	$1,000,000	16	September 14, 2011	December 18, 2011	Sophie Clarke	Benjamin "Coach" Wade	Albert Destrade	6–3–0
24	One World	Upolu, Samoa	Two tribes of nine new players divided by gender living on the same beach	$1,000,000	15	February 15, 2012	May 13, 2012	Kim Spradlin	Sabrina Thompson	Chelsea Meissner	7–2–0
25	Philippines	Caramoan, Camarines Sur, Philippines	Three tribes of six players, including three returning players who had been medically evacuated in a previous season	$1,000,000	15	September 19, 2012	December 16, 2012	Denise Stapley	Michael Skupin & Lisa Whelchel	—N/a	6–1–1
26	Caramoan	Caramoan, Camarines Sur, Philippines	Two tribes of ten: new players against past contestants	$1,000,000	15	February 13, 2013	May 12, 2013	John Cochran	Sherri Biethman & Dawn Meehan	—N/a	8–0–0
27	Blood vs. Water	Palaui Island, Santa Ana, Cagayan, Philippines	Two tribes of ten: returning contestants against their loved ones	$1,000,000	15	September 18, 2013	December 15, 2013	Tyson Apostol	Monica Culpepper	Gervase Peterson	7–1–0
28	Cagayan	Palaui Island, Santa Ana, Cagayan, Philippines	Three tribes of six new players divided by primary attribute: "brawn" vs. "brains" vs. "beauty"	$1,000,000	14	February 26, 2014	May 21, 2014	Tony Vlachos	Yung "Woo" Hwang	—N/a	8–1
29	San Juan del Sur	San Juan del Sur, Rivas, Nicaragua	Nine pairs of new players, each with a pre-existing relationship, divided into two tribes of nine	$1,000,000	15	September 24, 2014	December 17, 2014	Natalie Anderson	Jaclyn Schultz	Missy Payne	5–2–1
30	Worlds Apart	San Juan del Sur, Rivas, Nicaragua	Three tribes of six new players divided by social class: "white collar" vs. "blue collar" vs. "no collar"	$1,000,000	15	February 25, 2015	May 20, 2015	Mike Holloway	Carolyn Rivera & Will Sims II	—N/a	6–1–1
31	Cambodia	Koh Rong, Cambodia	Two tribes of ten returning players who only played once before, have not won, and were selected by public vote	$1,000,000	15	September 23, 2015	December 16, 2015	Jeremy Collins	Spencer Bledsoe & Tasha Fox	—N/a	10–0–0
32	Kaôh Rōng	Koh Rong, Cambodia	Three tribes of six new players divided by primary attribute: "brains" vs. "brawn" vs. "beauty"	$1,000,000	15	February 17, 2016	May 18, 2016	Michele Fitzgerald	Aubry Bracco	Tai Trang	5–2–0
33	Millennials vs. Gen X	Mamanuca Islands, Fiji	Two tribes of ten new players divided by generation: Millennials vs. Generation X	$1,000,000	14	September 21, 2016	December 14, 2016	Adam Klein	Ken McNickle & Hannah Shapiro	—N/a	10–0–0
34	Game Changers	Mamanuca Islands, Fiji	Two tribes of ten returning players	$1,000,000	13	March 8, 2017	May 24, 2017	Sarah Lacina	Brad Culpepper	Troy "Troyzan" Robertson	7–3–0
35	Heroes vs. Healers vs. Hustlers	Mamanuca Islands, Fiji	Three tribes of six new players divided by dominant perceived trait: "heroes" vs. "healers" vs. "hustlers	$1,000,000	14	September 27, 2017	December 20, 2017	Ben Driebergen	Chrissy Hofbeck	Ryan Ulrich	5–2–1
36	Ghost Island	Mamanuca Islands, Fiji	Two tribes of ten new players	$1,000,000	14	February 28, 2018	May 23, 2018	Wendell Holland	Domenick Abbate	Laurel Johnson	5–5–0; 1–0 (Note: The final vote was initially tied for Holland and Abbate. Johnson, who received no votes, was then tasked with casting the final tie-breaking vote.)
37	David vs. Goliath	Mamanuca Islands, Fiji	Two tribes of ten new players divided by adversity: "David" (underdogs) vs. "Goliath"	$1,000,000	14	September 26, 2018	December 19, 2018	Nick Wilson	Mike White	Angelina Keeley	7–3–0
38	Edge of Extinction	Mamanuca Islands, Fiji	Two tribes of nine, including four returning players	$1,000,000	14	February 20, 2019	May 15, 2019	Chris Underwood	Gavin Whitson	Julie Rosenberg	9–4–0
39	Island of the Idols	Mamanuca Islands, Fiji	Two tribes of ten new players. Past winners Rob Mariano and Sandra Diaz-Twine feature as non-playing mentors	$1,000,000	14	September 25, 2019	December 18, 2019	Tommy Sheehan	Dean Kowalski	Noura Salman	8–2–0
40	Winners at War	Mamanuca Islands, Fiji	Two tribes of ten winners of past Survivor seasons	$2,000,000	14	February 12, 2020	May 13, 2020	Tony Vlachos	Natalie Anderson	Michele Fitzgerald	12–4–0
41	—N/a (Note: No subtitle was used in promotion of the season. Instead, the show began following a number format similar to Big Brother and The Amazing Race.)	Mamanuca Islands, Fiji	Three tribes of six new players	$1,000,000	13	September 22, 2021	December 15, 2021	Erika Casupanan	Deshawn Radden	Xander Hastings	7–1–0
42	—N/a	Mamanuca Islands, Fiji	Three tribes of six new players	$1,000,000	13	March 9, 2022	May 25, 2022	Maryanne Oketch	Mike Turner	Romeo Escobar	7–1–0
43	—N/a	Mamanuca Islands, Fiji	Three tribes of six new players	$1,000,000	13	September 21, 2022	December 14, 2022	Mike Gabler	Cassidy Clark	Owen Knight	7–1–0
44	—N/a	Mamanuca Islands, Fiji	Three tribes of six new players	$1,000,000	13	March 1, 2023	May 24, 2023	Yamil "Yam Yam" Arocho	Heidi Lagares-Greenblatt	Carolyn Wiger	7–1–0
45	—N/a	Mamanuca Islands, Fiji	Three tribes of six players, including one returning player	$1,000,000	13	September 27, 2023	December 20, 2023	Dee Valladares	Austin Li Coon	Jake O'Kane	5–3–0
46	—N/a	Mamanuca Islands, Fiji	Three tribes of six new players	$1,000,000	13	February 28, 2024	May 22, 2024	Kenzie Petty	Charlie Davis	Ben Katzman	5–3–0
47	—N/a	Mamanuca Islands, Fiji	Three tribes of six new players	$1,000,000	14	September 18, 2024	December 18, 2024	Rachel LaMont	Sam Phalen	Sue Smey	7–1–0
48	—N/a	Mamanuca Islands, Fiji	Three tribes of six new players	$1,000,000	13	February 26, 2025	May 21, 2025	Kyle Fraser	Eva Erickson	Joe Hunter	5–2–1
49	—N/a	Mamanuca Islands, Fiji	Three tribes of six new players	$1,000,000	13	September 24, 2025	December 17, 2025	Savannah Louie	Sophi Balerdi	Sage Ahrens-Nichols	5–2–1
50	In the Hands of the Fans	Mamanuca Islands, Fiji	Three tribes of eight returning players	$2,000,000	13	February 25, 2026	May 20, 2026	Aubry Bracco	Jonathan Young	Joe Hunter	8–3–0

== Episodes ==
=== Borneo (Season 1, 2000) ===
No. overall	No. in season	Title	CBS recap	Original release date	U.S. viewers (millions)	Rating/share (18–49)
1	1	"The Marooning"	Recap	May 31, 2000	15.51	6.1/20
2	2	"The Generation Gap"	Recap	June 7, 2000	18.10	7.5/25
3	3	"Quest for Food"	Recap	June 14, 2000	23.25	9.4/29
4	4	"Too Little, Too Late?"	Recap	June 21, 2000	24.20	9.8/33
5	5	"Pulling Your Own Weight"	Recap	June 28, 2000	23.98	9.6/31
6	6	"Udder Revenge"	Recap	July 5, 2000	24.50	10.6/33
7	7	"The Merger"	Recap	July 12, 2000	24.50	10.4/34
8	8	"Thy Name Is Duplicity"	TBA	July 19, 2000	26.15	11.4/35
9	9	"Old and New Bonds"	Recap	July 26, 2000	27.18	11.9/36
10	10	"Crack in the Alliance"	Recap	August 2, 2000	27.41	11.9/38
11	11	"Long Hard Days"	Recap	August 9, 2000	28.00	12.1/38
12	12	"Death of an Alliance"	Recap	August 16, 2000	28.67	12.7/38
13	13	"The Final Four"	Recap	August 23, 2000	51.69	22.8/54
14	14	"Reunion"	N/A	August 23, 2000	38.77	22.5/36

=== The Australian Outback (Season 2, 2001) ===
No. overall	No. in season	Title	CBS recap	Original release date	U.S. viewers (millions)	Rating/share (18–49)
15	1	"Stranded"	Recap	January 25, 2001	45.37	21.8/48
16	2	"Suspicion"	Recap	February 1, 2001	29.04	11.9/28
17	3	"Trust No One"	Recap	February 8, 2001	29.04	12.2/28
18	4	"The Killing Fields"	Recap	February 15, 2001	28.23	11.7/29
19	5	"The Gloves Come Off"	Recap	February 22, 2001	28.78	11.9/28
20	6	"Trial by Fire"	Recap	March 1, 2001	31.32	13.7/34
21	7	"The Merge"	Recap	March 8, 2001	28.72	12.1/31
22	8	"Friends?"	Recap	March 15, 2001	28.46	12.0/33
23	9	"The First 24 Days"	N/A	March 22, 2001	22.93	9.7/26
24	10	"Honeymoon or Not?"	Recap	March 29, 2001	28.12	11.8/29
25	11	"Let's Make a Deal"	Recap	April 5, 2001	27.71	11.7/32
26	12	"No Longer Just a Game"	Recap	April 12, 2001	27.55	11.7/34
27	13	"Enough Is Enough"	Recap	April 19, 2001	28.41	11.7/32
28	14	"The Final Four"	Recap	April 26, 2001	26.89	11.2/31
29	15	"The Most Deserving"	Recap	May 3, 2001	36.35	15.9/39
30	16	"The Reunion"	N/A	May 3, 2001	28.01	13.2/31
Special	Special	"Back from the Outback"	N/A	May 10, 2001	16.26	6.1/18

=== Africa (Season 3, 2001–02) ===
No. overall	No. in season	Title	CBS recap	Original release date	U.S. viewers (millions)	Rating/share (18–49)
31	1	"Question of Trust"	Recap	September 13, 2001	23.84	10.4/20
32	2	"Who's Zooming Whom?"	Recap	September 20, 2001	19.59	7.9/20
33	3	"The Gods Are Angry"	Recap	September 27, 2001	20.43	8.0/20
34	4	"The Young and Untrusted"	Recap	October 4, 2001	18.73	7.8/18
35	5	"The Twist"	Recap	October 11, 2001	20.55	8.3/20
36	6	"I'd Never Do It to You"	Recap	October 18, 2001	19.71	8.1/21
37	7	"Will There Be a Feast Tonight?"	Recap	October 25, 2001	17.70	6.6/18
38	8	"The First 21 Days"	N/A	November 1, 2001	17.80	7.1/18
39	9	"Smoking Out the Snake"	Recap	November 8, 2001	19.28	7.9/21
40	10	"Dinner, Movie and a Betrayal"	Recap	November 15, 2001	18.39	7.3/20
41	11	"We Are Family"	Recap	November 22, 2001	19.60	7.7/22
42	12	"The Big Adventure"	Recap	November 29, 2001	18.92	7.5/20
43	13	"Truth Be Told"	Recap	December 6, 2001	21.31	8.7/20
44	14	"The Final Four: No Regrets"	Recap	December 13, 2001	27.26	11.3/25
45	15	"The Reunion"	N/A	December 20, 2001	19.05	8.7/20

=== Marquesas (Season 4, 2002) ===
No. overall	No. in season	Title	CBS recap	Original release date	U.S. viewers (millions)	Rating/share (18-49)
46	1	"Back to the Beach"	Recap	February 21, 2002	23.19	9.1/22
47	2	"Nacho Momma"	Recap	February 28, 2002	23.40	9.4/23
48	3	"No Pain, No Gain"	Recap	March 7, 2002	20.46	8.9/24
49	4	"The Winds Twist"	Recap	March 14, 2002	22.81	9.5/26
50	5	"The End of Innocence"	Recap	March 21, 2002	20.54	8.2/22
51	6	"The Underdogs"	Recap	March 28, 2002	22.17	9.1/24
52	7	"True Lies"	Recap	April 4, 2002	19.34	7.7/22
53	8	"Jury's Out"	Recap	April 11, 2002	19.88	8.0/23
54	9	"Look Closer: The First 24 Days"	N/A	April 18, 2002	12.50	4.8/15
55	10	"Two Peas in a Pod"	Recap	April 25, 2002	19.42	7.8/20
56	11	"The Princess"	Recap	May 2, 2002	19.60	7.8/21
57	12	"Marquesan Vacation"	Recap	May 9, 2002	20.83	8.1/22
58	13	"A Tale of Two Cities"	Recap	May 16, 2002	19.15	7.5/20
59	14	"The Sole Survivor"	Recap	May 23, 2002	25.87	10.4/23
60	15	"The Reunion"	N/A	May 30, 2002	17.89	8.0/19

=== Thailand (Season 5, 2002) ===
No. overall	No. in season	Title	CBS recap	Original release date	U.S. viewers (millions)	Rating/share (18-49)
61	1	"The Importance of Being Eldest"	Recap	September 19, 2002	23.05	9.6/28
62	2	"The Great Divide"	Recap	September 26, 2002	21.72	8.6/21
63	3	"Family Values"	Recap	October 3, 2002	21.46	8.9/22
64	4	"Gender Bender"	Recap	October 10, 2002	21.16	8.6/22
65	5	"The Ocean's Surprise"	Recap	October 17, 2002	22.69	9.2/24
66	6	"The Power of One"	Recap	October 24, 2002	20.94	8.5/21
67	7	"Assumptions"	Recap	October 31, 2002	18.79	7.5/20
68	8	"Sleeping with the Enemy"	Recap	November 7, 2002	19.05	7.0/18
69	9	"Desperate Measures"	Recap	November 14, 2002	21.62	8.6/22
70	10	"While the Cats are Away"	Recap	November 21, 2002	19.61	7.7/19
71	11	"The First 30 Days"	N/A	November 28, 2002	12.40	4.5/14
72	12	"A Big Surprise... and Another"	Recap	December 5, 2002	21.39	8.6/21
73	13	"The Tides are Turning"	Recap	December 12, 2002	19.00	7.4/20
74	14	"Slip Through Your Fingers"	Recap	December 19, 2002	24.08	9.9/26
75	15	"The Reunion"	N/A	December 26, 2002	20.42	9.2/24

=== The Amazon (Season 6, 2003) ===
No. overall	No. in season	Title	CBS recap	Original release date	U.S. viewers (millions)	Rating/share (18-49)
76	1	"Boys vs. Girls"	Recap	February 13, 2003	23.26	9.1/24
77	2	"Storms"	Recap	February 20, 2003	20.34	7.7/19
78	3	"Girl Power"	Recap	February 27, 2003	22.37	8.4/22
79	4	"Trapped"	Recap	March 6, 2003	23.33	9.3/23
80	5	"Pick-up Sticks"	Recap	March 13, 2003	21.05	8.1/21
81	6	"More Than Meats the Eye"	Recap	March 20, 2003	16.42	6.1/14
82	7	"Girls Gone Wilder"	Recap	March 27, 2003	16.67	6.3/16
83	8	"Sleeping with the Enemy"	Recap	April 3, 2003	19.80	7.3/19
84	9	"The Chain"	Recap	April 10, 2003	19.08	7.1/20
85	10	"Amazon Redux"	N/A	April 17, 2003	14.23	5.2/16
86	11	"Q and A"	Recap	April 24, 2003	18.09	6.5/19
87	12	"Sour Grapes"	Recap	May 1, 2003	17.65	6.5/19
88	13	"The Amazon Heats Up"	Recap	May 8, 2003	18.99	7.0/20
89	14	"...And Then There Were Four"	Recap	May 15, 2003	22.29	8.9/22
90	15	"The Reunion"	N/A	May 22, 2003	17.65	8.2/21

=== Pearl Islands (Season 7, 2003) ===
No. overall	No. in season	Title	CBS recap	Original release date	U.S. viewers (millions)	Rating/share (18-49)
91	1	"Beg, Barter, Steal"	Recap	September 18, 2003	21.50	8.4/23
92	2	"To Quit or Not to Quit"	Recap	September 25, 2003	19.86	7.5/21
93	3	"United We Stand, Divided We...?"	Recap	October 2, 2003	19.68	7.5/21
94	4	"Pick a Castaway...Any Castaway"	Recap	October 9, 2003	20.00	7.6/20
95	5	"Everyone's Hero"	Recap	October 16, 2003	19.35	7.4/20
96	6	"Me and My Snake"	Recap	October 23, 2003	20.19	7.5/20
97	7	"What the...?, Part 1"	Recap	October 30, 2003	20.70	7.8/21
98	8	"What the...?, Part 2"	Recap	November 6, 2003	21.30	8.1/21
99	9	"Shocking! Simply Shocking!"	Recap	November 13, 2003	22.10	8.3/21
100	10	"Swimming with Sharks"	Recap	November 20, 2003	19.90	7.0/19
101	11	"The Great Lie"	Recap	November 26, 2003	20.06	7.2/22
102	12	"Would You Be My Brutus Today?"	Recap	December 4, 2003	22.20	8.1/22
103	13	"Mutiny"	Recap	December 11, 2003	22.41	8.2/23
104	14	"Flames and Endurance"	Recap	December 14, 2003	25.23	9.7/22
105	15	"Reunion"	N/A	December 14, 2003	26.19	9.2/21

=== All-Stars (Season 8, 2004) ===
No. overall	No. in season	Title	CBS recap	Rating/share (18–49)	Original release date	U.S. viewers (millions)
106	1	"They're Back!"	Recap	14.9/37	January 29, 2004	33.27
107	2	"Panicked, Desperate, Thirsty as Hell"	Recap	8.9/22	February 5, 2004	23.07
108	3	"Shark Attack"	Recap	8.0/20	February 12, 2004	22.35
109	4	"Wipe Out!"	Recap	8.7/22	February 19, 2004	22.80
110	5	"I've Been Bamboozled!"	Recap	8.6/23	February 26, 2004	22.19
111	6	"Outraged"	Recap	8.7/23	March 4, 2004	23.22
112	7	"Sorry...I Blew It"	Recap	8.7/23	March 11, 2004	22.63
113	8	"Pick A Tribemate"	Recap	8.5/22	March 18, 2004	21.89
114	9	"A Closer Look (All Star Redux)"	N/A	TBA	March 25, 2004	16.70
115	10	"Mad Scramble and Broken Hearts"	Recap	8.3/23	April 1, 2004	21.69
116	11	"Anger, Tears and Chaos"	Recap	7.9/24	April 8, 2004	20.76
117	12	"A Thoughtful Gesture or a Deceptive Plan"	Recap	7.5/21	April 15, 2004	20.78
118	13	"Stupid People, Stupid, Stupid People"	Recap	7.6/22	April 22, 2004	20.99
119	14	"A Chapera Surprise"	Recap	7.5/21	April 29, 2004	20.78
120	15	"The Instigator"	Recap	7.2/20	May 6, 2004	19.21
121	16	"The Sole Surviving All-Star"	Recap	10.0/25	May 9, 2004	24.76
122	17	"Reunion"	N/A	12.8/29	May 9, 2004	28.36

=== Vanuatu (Season 9, 2004) ===
No. overall	No. in season	Title	CBS recap	Original release date	U.S. viewers (millions)	Rating/share (18–49)
123	1	"They Came at Us with Spears"	Recap	September 16, 2004	20.06	7.8/22
124	2	"Burly Girls, Bowheads, Young Studs, and the Old Bunch"	Recap	September 23, 2004	19.14	7.5/22
125	3	"Double Tribal, Double Trouble"	Recap	September 30, 2004	19.91	7.5/21
126	4	"Now That's a Reward!"	Recap	October 7, 2004	19.46	7.3/21
127	5	"Earthquakes and Shake-Ups!"	Recap	October 14, 2004	19.16	7.0/19
128	6	"Hog Tied"	Recap	October 21, 2004	19.22	7.3/20
129	7	"Anger, Threats, Tears...and Coffee"	Recap	October 28, 2004	20.24	7.6/20
130	8	"Now the Battle Really Begins"	Recap	November 4, 2004	20.70	7.8/
131	9	"Gender Wars...It's Getting Ugly"	Recap	November 11, 2004	20.14	7.4/
132	10	"Culture Shock and Violent Storms"	Recap	November 18, 2004	20.70	7.7/
133	11	"Surprise and...Surprise Again!"	Recap	November 25, 2004	16.48	6.0/
134	12	"Now Who's in Charge Here?!"	Recap	December 2, 2004	19.72	7.3/
135	13	"Eruption of Volcanic Magnitude"	Recap	December 9, 2004	20.30	7.6/
136	14	"Spirits and the Final Four"	Recap	December 16, 2004	19.72	7.5/16
137	15	"Reunion"	N/A	December 23, 2004	15.23	6.5/

=== Palau (Season 10, 2005) ===
No. overall	No. in season	Title	CBS recap	Original release date	U.S. viewers (millions)	Rating/share (18–49)
138	1	"This Has Never Happened Before!"	Recap	February 10, 2005	23.66	9.1/23
139	2	"Love is in the Air, Rats Are Everywhere"	Recap	February 17, 2005	21.64	7.9/20
140	3	"Dangerous Creatures and Horrible Setbacks"	Recap	February 24, 2005	21.80	8.5/
141	4	"Sumo at Sea"	Recap	March 3, 2005	21.80	8.1/22
142	5	"The Best and Worst Reward Ever"	Recap	March 10, 2005	18.42	6.9/19
143	6	"Jellyfish 'N Chips"	Recap	March 17, 2005	19.15	7.3/19
144	7	"The Great White Shark Hunter"	Recap	March 24, 2005	20.89	7.7/21
145	8	"Neanderthal Man"	Recap	March 31, 2005	19.75	7.0/20
146	9	"I Will Not Give Up"	Recap	April 7, 2005	20.00	7.1/
147	10	"Exile Island"	Recap	April 14, 2005	18.66	6.4/
148	11	"I'll Show You How Threatening I Am"	Recap	April 21, 2005	19.34	6.8/
149	12	"We'll Make You Pay"	Recap	April 28, 2005	20.07	7.1/21
150	13	"It Could All Backfire"	Recap	May 5, 2005	19.30	6.9/
151	14	"The Ultimate Shock"	Recap	May 12, 2005	20.80	7.8/18
152	15	"Reunion"	N/A	May 19, 2005	21.70	8.3/18

=== Guatemala (Season 11, 2005) ===
No. overall	No. in season	Title	Original release date	U.S. viewers (millions)	Rating/share (18–49)
153	1	"Big Trek, Big Trouble, Big Surprise"	September 15, 2005	18.41	6.6/19
154	2	"Man Down"	September 22, 2005	16.98	6.1/17
155	3	"The Brave May Not Live Long, but the Cautious Don't Live at All"	September 29, 2005	17.29	5.7/16
156	4	"To Betray, or Not to Betray"	October 6, 2005	17.92	6.3/17
157	5	"Crocs, Cowboys and City Slickers"	October 13, 2005	17.85	6.5/18
158	6	"Big Balls, Big Mouth, Big Trouble"	October 20, 2005	17.78	6.1/17
159	7	"Surprise Enemy Visit"	October 27, 2005	17.38	6.2/17
160	8	"The Hidden Immunity Idol"	November 3, 2005	18.28	6.6/17
161	9	"Secret and Lies and an Idol Surprise"	November 10, 2005	18.98	6.9/19
162	10	"Eating and Sleeping with the Enemy"	November 17, 2005	18.82	6.4/17
163	11	"Everything Is Personal"	November 24, 2005	19.54	6.6/20
164	12	"Price for Immunity"	December 1, 2005	19.82	7.0/21
165	13	"Big Win, Big Decision, Big Mistake?"	December 8, 2005	20.21	7.1/19
166	14	"Thunder Storms & Sacrifice"	December 15, 2005	21.18	7.7/17
167	15	"The Reunion"	December 22, 2005	15.21	5.7/14

=== Panama (Season 12, 2006) ===
No. overall	No. in season	Title	Original release date	U.S. viewers (millions)	Rating/share (18–49)
168	1	"The First Exile"	February 2, 2006	19.20	7.0/18
169	2	"Breakdown"	February 9, 2006	18.75	6.6/17
170	3	"Crazy Fights, Snake Dinners"	February 16, 2006	16.98	6.3/16
171	4	"Starvation and Lunacy"	February 23, 2006	14.85	5.5/14
172	5	"For Cod's Sake"	March 2, 2006	16.08	5.5/14
173	6	"Salvation and Desertion"	March 9, 2006	15.33	5.4/14
174	7	"A Closer Look"	March 15, 2006	12.68	4.4/
175	8	"An Emerging Plan"	March 30, 2006	16.25	5.8/17
176	9	"The Power of the Idol"	April 6, 2006	16.36	5.6/17
177	10	"Fight for Your Life or Eat"	April 13, 2006	15.07	5.2/17
178	11	"Medical Emergency"	April 20, 2006	16.26	5.5/18
179	12	"Perilous Scramble"	April 27, 2006	17.09	5.9/18
180	13	"Bamboozled"	May 4, 2006	17.04	5.9/18
181	14	"Call the Whambulence!"	May 11, 2006	17.20	5.8/18
182	15	"The Final Showdown"	May 14, 2006	17.07	6.2/15
183	16	"Reunion"	May 14, 2006	11.65	4.6/

=== Cook Islands (Season 13, 2006) ===
No. overall	No. in season	Title	Original release date	U.S. viewers (millions)	Rating/share (18-49)
184	1	"I Can Forgive Her but I Don't Have to Because She Screwed with My Chickens"	September 14, 2006	18.00	6.5/20
185	2	"Dire Strengths and Dead Weight"	September 21, 2006	17.43	6.5/18
186	3	"Flirting and Frustration"	September 28, 2006	16.85	5.9/16
187	4	"Ruling the Roost"	October 5, 2006	15.83	5.6/16
188	5	"Don't Cry Over Spilled Octopus"	October 12, 2006	15.84	5.5/15
189	6	"Plan Voodoo"	October 19, 2006	15.02	5.3/14
190	7	"A Closer Look"	October 26, 2006	15.30	5.4/14
191	8	"Why Aren't You Swimming?!"	November 2, 2006	15.30	5.4/14
192	9	"Mutiny"	November 9, 2006	14.39	4.8/13
193	10	"People That You Like Want to See You Suffer"	November 16, 2006	15.35	5.3/14
194	11	"Why Would You Trust Me?"	November 23, 2006	12.67	4.3/13
195	12	"You're a Rat..."	November 30, 2006	15.63	5.4/14
196	13	"Arranging a Hit"	December 7, 2006	15.72	5.3/15
197	14	"I Have the Advantage...For Once"	December 14, 2006	14.55	5.0/14
198	15	"This Tribe Will Self-Destruct in 5, 4, 3..."	December 17, 2006	16.42	5.7/14
199	16	"Reunion"	December 17, 2006	N/A	TBA

=== Fiji (Season 14, 2007) ===
No. overall	No. in season	Title	Original release date	U.S. viewers (millions)	Rating/share (18-49)
200	1	"Something Cruel Is About to Happen...Real Soon"	February 8, 2007	16.44	5.7/15
201	2	"Snakes Are Misunderstood...We Have an Understanding Now"	February 15, 2007	16.08	5.6/15
202	3	"This Is Not Survival...It's Thrival"	February 22, 2007	13.47	4.6/12
203	4	"Let's Just Call Jeff on the Jeff Phone"	March 1, 2007	14.67	5.0/13
204	5	"Love Many, Trust Few, Do Wrong to None"	March 8, 2007	13.81	4.6/12
205	6	"I've Got Strength Now to Carry the Flag"	March 21, 2007	12.78	4.2/12
206	7	"An Evil Thought"	March 29, 2007	13.71	4.5/14
207	8	"So You Think You Can Meke?"	April 5, 2007	13.58	4.3/13
208	9	"Are We Gonna Live on Exile Island?!"	April 12, 2007	14.25	4.5/13
209	10	"It's a Turtle?!"	April 19, 2007	13.33	4.5/13
210	11	"Blackmail or Betrayal"	April 26, 2007	13.83	4.6/14
211	12	"A Smile, Velvet Gloves and a Dagger in My Pocket"	May 3, 2007	13.74	4.6/14
212	13	"I Wanna See If I Can Make a Deal"	May 10, 2007	13.77	4.4/14
213	14	"You've Got That Puzzled Look"	May 13, 2007	13.63	4.6/13
214	15	"Reunion"	May 13, 2007	11.43	4.1/

=== China (Season 15, 2007) ===
No. overall	No. in season	Title	Original release date	U.S. viewers (millions)	Rating/share (18-49)
215	1	"A Chicken's a Little Bit Smarter"	September 20, 2007	15.35	9.0/15
216	2	"My Mom Is Going to Kill Me!"	September 27, 2007	14.15	8.3/14
217	3	"I Lost Two Hands and Possibly a Shoulder"	October 4, 2007	14.14	8.5/14
218	4	"Ride the Workhorse Till the Tail Falls Off"	October 11, 2007	14.22	8.6/14
219	5	"Love Is In the Air"	October 18, 2007	14.03	8.5/13
220	6	"That's Love, Baby! It Makes You Strong!"	October 25, 2007	14.19	8.5/14
221	7	"I'm Not As Dumb As I Look"	November 1, 2007	14.44	8.5/14
222	8	"High School Friend Contest"	November 8, 2007	14.86	8.7/14
223	9	"Just Don't Eat the Apple"	November 15, 2007	14.68	8.9/14
224	10	"It’s Been Real and It's Been Fun"	November 22, 2007	11.58	3.6/
225	11	"Ready to Bite the Apple"	November 29, 2007	13.57	8.3/13
226	12	"Going for the Oscar"	December 6, 2007	14.05	8.2/13
227	13	"Hello, I'm Still a Person"	December 13, 2007	13.86	8.7/14
228	14	"A Slippery Little Sucker"	December 16, 2007	15.18	8.5/13
229	15	"Reunion"	December 16, 2007	12.30	4.5/

=== Micronesia (Season 16, 2008) ===
No. overall	No. in season	Title	Rating/share (household)	Rating/share (18-49)	Original release date	U.S. viewers (millions)	Weekly rank
230	1	"You Guys Are Dumber Than You Look"	8.1/13	4.8/13	February 7, 2008	14.02	8
231	2	"The Sounds of Jungle Love"	7.6/12	4.5/13	February 14, 2008	13.12	6
232	3	"I Should Be Carried on the Chariot-Type Thing!"	7.3/11	4.0/10	February 21, 2008	12.55	8
233	4	"That's Baked, Barbecued and Fried!"	7.5/12	4.2/11	February 28, 2008	12.47	10
234	5	"He's a Ball of Goo!"	7.3/11	4.0/10	March 6, 2008	12.06	8
235	6	"It Hit Everyone Pretty Hard"	7.9/13	4.2/13	March 13, 2008	13.06	3
236	7	"Like a Wide-Eyed Kid in the Candy Store"	6.7/11	3.7/10	March 19, 2008	11.34	6
237	8	"A Lost Puppy Dog"	7.5/12	3.8/9	April 3, 2008	12.84	11
238	9	"I'm in Such a Hot Pickle!"	6.9/11	3.8/11	April 10, 2008	11.68	17
239	10	"I Promise..."	7.4/13	3.8/12	April 17, 2008	12.09	11
240	11	"I'm Ruthless... and Have a Smile on My Face"	7.9/13	4.2/13	April 24, 2008	12.98	12
241	12	"I'm Gonna Fix Her!"	7.7/13	4.0/12	May 1, 2008	12.53	14
242	13	"If It Smells Like a Rat, Give It Cheese"	7.7/13	4.1/12	May 8, 2008	11.98	9
243	14	"Stir the Pot!"	7.2/12	4.4/12	May 11, 2008	12.92	11
244	15	"The Reunion"	6.0/10	3.9/10	May 11, 2008	10.84	12

=== Gabon (Season 17, 2008) ===
No. overall	No. in season	Title	Rating/share (household)	Rating/share (18-49)	Original release date	U.S. viewers (millions)	Weekly rank
245	1	"Want to See the Elephant Dung?"	7.7/12	4.4/11	September 25, 2008	13.06	#13
246	2	"She Obviously Is Post-Op!"	7.7/12	4.3/12	October 2, 2008	13.08	#12
247	3	"It Was Like Christmas Morning!"	7.7/12	4.3/12	October 9, 2008	13.28	#12
248	4	"This Camp Is Cursed"	7.8/13	4.2/12	October 16, 2008	12.81	#12
249	5	"He's a Snake, But He's My Snake"	7.8/12	4.4/12	October 23, 2008	13.31	#14
250	6	"It All Depends on the Pin-Up Girl"	7.7/13	4.1/12	October 30, 2008	13.02	#15
251	7	"Apple in the Garden of Eden"	7.2/11	3.8/10	November 6, 2008	12.01	#15
252	8	"The Brains Behind Everything"	7.6/12	4.1/11	November 13, 2008	12.89	#15
253	9	"Nothing Tastes Better Than Five Hundred Dollars"	7.5/12	4.0/11	November 20, 2008	12.50	#14
254	10	"I Was Put on the Planet For This Show"	4.9/10	2.3/7	November 27, 2008	8.31	TBA
255	11	"The Good Things in Life Aren’t Easy"	7.5/12	4.0/11	December 4, 2008	12.73	#11
256	12	"The Good Guys Should Win in the End"	7.7/12	4.1/11	December 11, 2008	13.05	#14
257	13	"Say Goodbye to Gabon"	7.8/12	TBA	December 14, 2008	13.77	#9
258	14	"Reunion"	7.0/12	TBA	December 14, 2008	11.74	#15

=== Tocantins (Season 18, 2009) ===
No. overall	No. in season	Title	Rating/share (household)	Rating/share (18-49)	Original release date	U.S. viewers (millions)	Weekly rank
259	1	"Let's Get Rid of the Weak Players Before We Even Start"	8.0/13	4.5/13	February 12, 2009	13.63	#12
260	2	"The Poison Apple Needs to Go"	7.8/12	4.5/12	February 19, 2009	13.59	#11
261	3	"Mama Said There'd Be Days Like This"	6.9/11	4.0/11	February 26, 2009	12.05	#11
262	4	"The Strongest Man Alive"	7.0/11	3.9/10	March 5, 2009	11.85	#15
263	5	"You're Going to Want that Tooth"	7.3/12	4.1/12	March 12, 2009	12.82	#15
264	6	"The First Fifteen Days"	5.0/8	2.3/6	March 25, 2009	8.15	TBA
265	7	"One of Those 'Coach Moments'"	6.5/11	3.6/11	April 2, 2009	11.27	#17
266	8	"The Dragon Slayer"	6.6/12	3.5/11	April 9, 2009	11.24	#16
267	9	"The Biggest Fraud in the Game"	6.8/12	3.5/11	April 16, 2009	11.64	#15
268	10	"It's Funny When People Cry"	6.8/12	3.2/11	April 23, 2009	11.30	#12
269	11	"They Both Went Bananas"	7.0/12	3.6/11	April 30, 2009	11.73	#17
270	12	"The Ultimate Sacrifice"	7.0/12	3.8/12	May 7, 2009	11.99	#15
271	13	"The Martyr Approach"	7.0/12	3.8/11	May 14, 2009	12.18	#18
272	14	"I Trust You But I Trust Me More"	7.0/11	4.2/	May 17, 2009	12.94	#14
273	15	"Reunion"	6.4/11	4.1/	May 17, 2009	11.59	#20

=== Samoa (Season 19, 2009) ===
No. overall	No. in season	Title	Rating/share (household)	Rating/share (18-49)	Original release date	U.S. viewers (millions)	Weekly rank
274	1	"The Puppet Master"	6.8/11	3.6/11	September 17, 2009	11.66	#12
275	2	"Taking Candy From a Baby"	6.7/11	3.7/11	September 24, 2009	11.66	#22
276	3	"It's Called a Russell Seed"	6.9/11	3.7/11	October 1, 2009	11.54	#22
277	4	"Hungry for a Win"	7.0/11	3.4/10	October 8, 2009	11.69	#19
278	5	"Walking on Thin Ice"	7.1/11	3.5/10	October 15, 2009	11.78	#19
279	6	"This Is the Man Test"	7.7/12	4.0/11	October 22, 2009	12.88	#17
280	7	"Houdini Magic"	6.9/11	3.7/10	October 29, 2009	12.19	#15
281	8	"All Hell Breaks Loose"	7.3/11	3.7/10	November 5, 2009	12.44	#20
282	9	"Tastes Like Chicken"	7.5/12	4.0/11	November 12, 2009	12.94	#18
283	10	"The Day of Reckoning"	7.2/11	3.8/11	November 19, 2009	12.33	#19
284	11	"The First 27 Days"	5.3/11	3.1	November 26, 2009	9.94	#23
285	12	"Off With Their Heads!"	7.5/12	3.9/11	December 3, 2009	12.82	#7
286	13	"Damage Control"	7.6/12	4.2/12	December 10, 2009	13.25	#11
287	14	"Two Brains Are Better Than One"	7.3/12	3.9/12	December 17, 2009	12.46	#16
288	15	"This Game Ain't Over"	7.6/12	4.4/11	December 20, 2009	13.97	#12
289	16	"Reunion"	6.4/11	3.8/10	December 20, 2009	11.68	#17

=== Heroes vs. Villains (Season 20, 2010) ===
No. overall	No. in season	Title	Rating/share (household)	Rating/share (18-49)	Original release date	U.S. viewers (millions)	Weekly rank
290	1	"Slay Everyone, Trust No One"	8.1/13	4.5/12	February 11, 2010	14.15	#14
291	2	"It's Getting the Best of Me"	6.9/11	3.9/11	February 18, 2010	11.94	#11
292	3	"That Girl is Like a Virus"	6.7/10	3.7/10	February 25, 2010	11.60	#14
293	4	"Tonight, We Make Our Move"	7.2/12	3.8/11	March 4, 2010	12.72	#17
294	5	"Knights of the Round Table"	7.0/11	3.6/11	March 11, 2010	12.17	#14
295	6	"Banana Etiquette"	6.6/11	3.4/11	March 24, 2010	11.15	#15
296	7	"I'm Not a Good Villain"	6.7/12	3.5/13	April 1, 2010	11.26	#11
297	8	"Expectations"	7.3/12	3.8/12	April 8, 2010	12.38	#13
298	9	"Survivor History"	7.1/13	3.8/12	April 15, 2010	12.31	#12
299	10	"Going Down in Flames"	7.0/12	3.6/11	April 22, 2010	11.89	#8
300	11	"Jumping Ship"	7.6/13	4.1/13	April 29, 2010	12.74	#9
301	12	"A Sinking Ship"	7.7/14	4.1/14	May 6, 2010	13.06	#8
302	13	"Loose Lips Sink Ships"	7.7/13	4.1/13	May 13, 2010	13.28	#11
303	14	"Anything Could Happen"	7.2/12	Unknown	May 16, 2010	13.46	#9
304	15	"The Reunion"	5.9/10	Unknown	May 16, 2010	10.65	#22
