= List of Survivor (American TV series) episodes (seasons 21–40) =

Airings of the CBS reality series from 2010 to 2020

Survivor is an American reality television show, a derivative of the Swedish program, Expedition Robinson. It is broadcast on CBS and hosted by Jeff Probst.

The first season, Survivor: Borneo, premiered on May 31, 2000 as part of the summer 2000 primetime scheduling cycle, and it has been aired semiannually since 2001. As of May 20, 2026, 727 episodes of Survivor have aired, including six specials, currently in its fiftieth season. On January 22, 2026, ahead of the season 50 premiere, the show was renewed for a 51st season.

== Series overview ==
Season	Subtitle	Location	Original Tribes	Grand Prize	Episodes	Originally released		Winner	Runner(s)–up	2nd Runner-up	Final vote
Season	Subtitle	Location	Original Tribes	Grand Prize	Episodes	First released	Last released	Winner	Runner(s)–up	2nd Runner-up	Final vote
1	Borneo	Pulau Tiga, Sabah, Malaysia	Two tribes of eight new players	$1,000,000 (Note: For Borneo–Panama and In the Hands of the Fans, the winner also received a car as part of the grand prize.)	14	May 31, 2000	August 23, 2000	Richard Hatch	Kelly Wiglesworth	—N/a	4–3
2	The Australian Outback	Herbert River at Goshen Station, Queensland, Australia	Two tribes of eight new players	$1,000,000	16	January 28, 2001	May 3, 2001	Tina Wesson	Colby Donaldson	—N/a	4–3
3	Africa	Shaba National Reserve, Kenya	Two tribes of eight new players	$1,000,000	15	October 11, 2001	January 10, 2002	Ethan Zohn	Kim Johnson	—N/a	5–2
4	Marquesas	Nuku Hiva, Marquesas Islands, French Polynesia	Two tribes of eight new players	$1,000,000	15	February 28, 2002	May 19, 2002	Vecepia Towery	Neleh Dennis	—N/a	4–3
5	Thailand	Ko Tarutao, Satun Province, Thailand	Two tribes of eight new players; picked by the two oldest players	$1,000,000	15	September 19, 2002	December 19, 2002	Brian Heidik	Clay Jordan	—N/a	4–3
6	The Amazon	Rio Negro, Amazonas, Brazil	Two tribes of eight new players divided by gender	$1,000,000	15	February 13, 2003	May 11, 2003	Jenna Morasca	Matthew Von Ertfelda	—N/a	6–1
7	Pearl Islands	Pearl Islands, Panama	Two tribes of eight new players	$1,000,000	15	September 18, 2003	December 14, 2003	Sandra Diaz-Twine	Lillian Morris	—N/a	6–1
8	All-Stars	Pearl Islands, Panama	Three tribes of six returning players	$1,000,000	17	February 1, 2004	May 9, 2004	Amber Brkich	Rob Mariano	—N/a	4–3
9	Vanuatu	Efate, Shefa, Vanuatu	Two tribes of nine new players divided by gender	$1,000,000	15	September 16, 2004	December 12, 2004	Chris Daugherty	Twila Tanner	—N/a	5–2
10	Palau	Koror, Palau	A schoolyard pick of two tribes of nine new players each; two eliminated without a tribe	$1,000,000	15	February 17, 2005	May 15, 2005	Tom Westman	Katie Gallagher	—N/a	6–1
11	Guatemala	Petén, Guatemala	Two tribes of nine, including two returning players	$1,000,000	15	September 15, 2005	December 11, 2005	Danni Boatwright	Stephenie LaGrossa	—N/a	6–1
12	Panama	Pearl Islands, Panama	Four tribes of four new players divided by age and gender	$1,000,000	16	February 2, 2006	May 14, 2006	Aras Baskauskas	Danielle DiLorenzo	—N/a	5–2
13	Cook Islands	Aitutaki, Cook Islands	Four tribes of five new players divided by ethnicity: African Americans, Whites, Hispanics, and Asians	$1,000,000	16	September 14, 2006	December 17, 2006	Yul Kwon	Ozzy Lusth	Becky Lee	5–4–0
14	Fiji	Macuata, Vanua Levu, Fiji	Two tribes of nine new players divided by one selected castaway, who would replace the first person voted out	$1,000,000	15	February 8, 2007	May 13, 2007	Earl Cole	Cassandra Franklin & Andria "Dreamz" Herd	—N/a	9–0–0
15	China	Zhelin, Jiujiang, Jiangxi, China	Two tribes of eight new players	$1,000,000	15	September 20, 2007	December 16, 2007	Todd Herzog	Courtney Yates	Amanda Kimmel	4–2–1
16	Micronesia	Koror, Palau	Two tribes of ten: new players against past contestants	$1,000,000	15	February 7, 2008	May 11, 2008	Parvati Shallow	Amanda Kimmel	—N/a	5–3
17	Gabon	Estuaire, Gabon	A schoolyard pick of two tribes of nine new players, starting with the oldest players	$1,000,000	14	September 25, 2008	December 14, 2008	Robert "Bob" Crowley	Susie Smith	Jessica "Sugar" Kiper	4–3–0
18	Tocantins	Jalapão, Tocantins, Brazil	Two tribes of eight new players	$1,000,000	15	February 12, 2009	May 17, 2009	James "J.T." Thomas Jr.	Stephen Fishbach	—N/a	7–0
19	Samoa	Upolu, Samoa	Two tribes of ten new players	$1,000,000	16	September 17, 2009	December 20, 2009	Natalie White	Russell Hantz	Mick Trimming	7–2–0
20	Heroes vs. Villains	Upolu, Samoa	Two tribes of ten returning players divided by reputation: "heroes" vs. "villains"	$1,000,000	15	February 11, 2010	May 16, 2010	Sandra Diaz-Twine	Parvati Shallow	Russell Hantz	6–3–0
21	Nicaragua	San Juan del Sur, Rivas, Nicaragua	Two tribes of ten new players divided by age	$1,000,000	16	September 15, 2010	December 19, 2010	Jud "Fabio" Birza	Chase Rice	Matthew "Sash" Lenahan	5–4–0
22	Redemption Island	San Juan del Sur, Rivas, Nicaragua	Two tribes of nine, including two returning players	$1,000,000	15	February 16, 2011	May 15, 2011	Rob Mariano	Phillip Sheppard	Natalie Tenerelli	8–1–0
23	South Pacific	Upolu, Samoa	Two tribes of nine, including two returning players	$1,000,000	16	September 14, 2011	December 18, 2011	Sophie Clarke	Benjamin "Coach" Wade	Albert Destrade	6–3–0
24	One World	Upolu, Samoa	Two tribes of nine new players divided by gender living on the same beach	$1,000,000	15	February 15, 2012	May 13, 2012	Kim Spradlin	Sabrina Thompson	Chelsea Meissner	7–2–0
25	Philippines	Caramoan, Camarines Sur, Philippines	Three tribes of six players, including three returning players who had been medically evacuated in a previous season	$1,000,000	15	September 19, 2012	December 16, 2012	Denise Stapley	Michael Skupin & Lisa Whelchel	—N/a	6–1–1
26	Caramoan	Caramoan, Camarines Sur, Philippines	Two tribes of ten: new players against past contestants	$1,000,000	15	February 13, 2013	May 12, 2013	John Cochran	Sherri Biethman & Dawn Meehan	—N/a	8–0–0
27	Blood vs. Water	Palaui Island, Santa Ana, Cagayan, Philippines	Two tribes of ten: returning contestants against their loved ones	$1,000,000	15	September 18, 2013	December 15, 2013	Tyson Apostol	Monica Culpepper	Gervase Peterson	7–1–0
28	Cagayan	Palaui Island, Santa Ana, Cagayan, Philippines	Three tribes of six new players divided by primary attribute: "brawn" vs. "brains" vs. "beauty"	$1,000,000	14	February 26, 2014	May 21, 2014	Tony Vlachos	Yung "Woo" Hwang	—N/a	8–1
29	San Juan del Sur	San Juan del Sur, Rivas, Nicaragua	Nine pairs of new players, each with a pre-existing relationship, divided into two tribes of nine	$1,000,000	15	September 24, 2014	December 17, 2014	Natalie Anderson	Jaclyn Schultz	Missy Payne	5–2–1
30	Worlds Apart	San Juan del Sur, Rivas, Nicaragua	Three tribes of six new players divided by social class: "white collar" vs. "blue collar" vs. "no collar"	$1,000,000	15	February 25, 2015	May 20, 2015	Mike Holloway	Carolyn Rivera & Will Sims II	—N/a	6–1–1
31	Cambodia	Koh Rong, Cambodia	Two tribes of ten returning players who only played once before, have not won, and were selected by public vote	$1,000,000	15	September 23, 2015	December 16, 2015	Jeremy Collins	Spencer Bledsoe & Tasha Fox	—N/a	10–0–0
32	Kaôh Rōng	Koh Rong, Cambodia	Three tribes of six new players divided by primary attribute: "brains" vs. "brawn" vs. "beauty"	$1,000,000	15	February 17, 2016	May 18, 2016	Michele Fitzgerald	Aubry Bracco	Tai Trang	5–2–0
33	Millennials vs. Gen X	Mamanuca Islands, Fiji	Two tribes of ten new players divided by generation: Millennials vs. Generation X	$1,000,000	14	September 21, 2016	December 14, 2016	Adam Klein	Ken McNickle & Hannah Shapiro	—N/a	10–0–0
34	Game Changers	Mamanuca Islands, Fiji	Two tribes of ten returning players	$1,000,000	13	March 8, 2017	May 24, 2017	Sarah Lacina	Brad Culpepper	Troy "Troyzan" Robertson	7–3–0
35	Heroes vs. Healers vs. Hustlers	Mamanuca Islands, Fiji	Three tribes of six new players divided by dominant perceived trait: "heroes" vs. "healers" vs. "hustlers	$1,000,000	14	September 27, 2017	December 20, 2017	Ben Driebergen	Chrissy Hofbeck	Ryan Ulrich	5–2–1
36	Ghost Island	Mamanuca Islands, Fiji	Two tribes of ten new players	$1,000,000	14	February 28, 2018	May 23, 2018	Wendell Holland	Domenick Abbate	Laurel Johnson	5–5–0; 1–0 (Note: The final vote was initially tied for Holland and Abbate. Johnson, who received no votes, was then tasked with casting the final tie-breaking vote.)
37	David vs. Goliath	Mamanuca Islands, Fiji	Two tribes of ten new players divided by adversity: "David" (underdogs) vs. "Goliath"	$1,000,000	14	September 26, 2018	December 19, 2018	Nick Wilson	Mike White	Angelina Keeley	7–3–0
38	Edge of Extinction	Mamanuca Islands, Fiji	Two tribes of nine, including four returning players	$1,000,000	14	February 20, 2019	May 15, 2019	Chris Underwood	Gavin Whitson	Julie Rosenberg	9–4–0
39	Island of the Idols	Mamanuca Islands, Fiji	Two tribes of ten new players. Past winners Rob Mariano and Sandra Diaz-Twine feature as non-playing mentors	$1,000,000	14	September 25, 2019	December 18, 2019	Tommy Sheehan	Dean Kowalski	Noura Salman	8–2–0
40	Winners at War	Mamanuca Islands, Fiji	Two tribes of ten winners of past Survivor seasons	$2,000,000	14	February 12, 2020	May 13, 2020	Tony Vlachos	Natalie Anderson	Michele Fitzgerald	12–4–0
41	—N/a (Note: No subtitle was used in promotion of the season. Instead, the show began following a number format similar to Big Brother and The Amazing Race.)	Mamanuca Islands, Fiji	Three tribes of six new players	$1,000,000	13	September 22, 2021	December 15, 2021	Erika Casupanan	Deshawn Radden	Xander Hastings	7–1–0
42	—N/a	Mamanuca Islands, Fiji	Three tribes of six new players	$1,000,000	13	March 9, 2022	May 25, 2022	Maryanne Oketch	Mike Turner	Romeo Escobar	7–1–0
43	—N/a	Mamanuca Islands, Fiji	Three tribes of six new players	$1,000,000	13	September 21, 2022	December 14, 2022	Mike Gabler	Cassidy Clark	Owen Knight	7–1–0
44	—N/a	Mamanuca Islands, Fiji	Three tribes of six new players	$1,000,000	13	March 1, 2023	May 24, 2023	Yamil "Yam Yam" Arocho	Heidi Lagares-Greenblatt	Carolyn Wiger	7–1–0
45	—N/a	Mamanuca Islands, Fiji	Three tribes of six players, including one returning player	$1,000,000	13	September 27, 2023	December 20, 2023	Dee Valladares	Austin Li Coon	Jake O'Kane	5–3–0
46	—N/a	Mamanuca Islands, Fiji	Three tribes of six new players	$1,000,000	13	February 28, 2024	May 22, 2024	Kenzie Petty	Charlie Davis	Ben Katzman	5–3–0
47	—N/a	Mamanuca Islands, Fiji	Three tribes of six new players	$1,000,000	14	September 18, 2024	December 18, 2024	Rachel LaMont	Sam Phalen	Sue Smey	7–1–0
48	—N/a	Mamanuca Islands, Fiji	Three tribes of six new players	$1,000,000	13	February 26, 2025	May 21, 2025	Kyle Fraser	Eva Erickson	Joe Hunter	5–2–1
49	—N/a	Mamanuca Islands, Fiji	Three tribes of six new players	$1,000,000	13	September 24, 2025	December 17, 2025	Savannah Louie	Sophi Balerdi	Sage Ahrens-Nichols	5–2–1
50	In the Hands of the Fans	Mamanuca Islands, Fiji	Three tribes of eight returning players	$2,000,000	13	February 25, 2026	May 20, 2026	Aubry Bracco	Jonathan Young	Joe Hunter	8–3–0

== Episodes ==
=== Nicaragua (Season 21, 2010) ===
No. overall	No. in season	Title	Rating/share (household)	Rating/share (18-49)	Original release date	U.S. viewers (millions)	Weekly rank
305	1	"Young at Heart"	6.8/12	4.0/13	September 15, 2010	12.23	#7
306	2	"Fatigue Makes Cowards of Us All"	7.0/12	4.0/12	September 22, 2010	12.59	#19
307	3	"Glitter in Their Eyes"	7.1/12	3.5/11	September 29, 2010	12.26	#18
308	4	"Pulling the Trigger"	7.0/12	3.8/11	October 6, 2010	12.05	#19
309	5	"Turf Wars"	6.9/11	3.8/11	October 13, 2010	12.32	#15
310	6	"Worst Case Scenario"	7.0/12	3.6/11	October 20, 2010	12.26	#14
311	7	"What Goes Around, Comes Around"	6.6/11	3.5/10	October 27, 2010	11.82	#19
312	8	"Company Will Be Arriving Soon"	7.0/11	3.7/11	November 3, 2010	12.30	#13
313	9	"Running the Camp"	6.4/10	3.2/10	November 10, 2010	11.29	#19
314	10	"Stuck in the Middle"	6.9/11	3.5/10	November 17, 2010	11.98	#17
315	11	"We Did it Guys"	4.7/8	2.0/7	November 24, 2010	8.02	#24
316	12	"You Started, You're Finishing"	7.0/11	3.6/11	December 1, 2010	12.26	#6
317	13	"Not Sure Where I Stand"	6.8/11	3.6/10	December 8, 2010	12.13	#10
318	14	"This is Going to Hurt"	7.0/12	3.5/11	December 15, 2010	12.32	#10
319	15	"What About Me?"	7.3/12	4.1/10	December 19, 2010	13.58	#8
320	16	"Reunion"	6.1/11	3.0/8	December 19, 2010	11.19	#14

=== Redemption Island (Season 22, 2011) ===
No. overall	No. in season	Title	Rating/share (household)	Rating/share (18-49)	Original release date	U.S. viewers (millions)	Weekly rank
321	1	"You're Looking at the New Leader of Your Tribe"	6.2/10	3.2/9	February 16, 2011	11.155	#15
322	2	"You Own My Vote"	6.2/10	3.1/9	February 23, 2011	10.932	#17
323	3	"Keep Hope Alive"	6.3/10	3.3/10	March 2, 2011	11.315	#14
324	4	"Don't You Work for Me?"	6.3/10	3.2/9	March 9, 2011	10.960	#14
325	5	"We Hate Our Tribe"	6.0/10	3.2/10	March 16, 2011	10.727	#13
326	6	"Their Red-Headed Step Child"	6.3/10	3.1/9	March 23, 2011	11.003	#11
327	7	"It Don't Take a Smart One"	6.3/10	3.1/9	March 30, 2011	11.005	#18
328	8	"This Game Respects Big Moves"	6.3/10	3.2/10	April 6, 2011	10.937	#17
329	9	"The Buddy System"	6.6/11	3.1/9	April 13, 2011	11.086	#10
330	10	"Rice Wars"	6.3/10	3.1/9	April 20, 2011	11.024	#10
331	11	"A Mystery Package"	6.4/10	3.2/9	April 27, 2011	11.324	#9
332	12	"You Mangled My Nets"	6.4/10	3.1/9	May 4, 2011	10.990	#13
333	13	"Too Close For Comfort"	6.3/10	3.1/9	May 11, 2011	10.771	#18
334	14	"Seems Like a No Brainer"	7.1/11	4.0/10	May 15, 2011	13.303	#8
335	15	"Reunion"	5.9/9	3.5/8	May 15, 2011	10.950	#16

=== South Pacific (Season 23, 2011) ===
No. overall	No. in season	Title	Rating/share (household)	Rating/share (18-49)	Original release date	U.S. viewers (millions)	Weekly rank
336	1	"I Need Redemption"	6.4/10	3.4/10	September 14, 2011	10.74	#9
337	2	"He Has Demons"	6.3/10	3.2/9	September 21, 2011	10.46	N/A
338	3	"Reap What You Sow"	6.4/10	3.2/9	September 28, 2011	10.71	#25
339	4	"Survivalism"	6.3/10	3.1/9	October 5, 2011	10.72	#24
340	5	"Taste the Victory"	6.6/11	3.2/9	October 12, 2011	10.69	#23
341	6	"Free Agent"	6.7/11	3.3/9	October 19, 2011	11.24	#23
342	7	"Trojan Horse"	7.1/11	3.5/10	October 26, 2011	11.79	#17
343	8	"Double Agent"	7.0/11	3.6/10	November 2, 2011	11.95	#18
344	9	"Cut Throat"	6.5/10	3.2/9	November 9, 2011	10.80	#22
345	10	"Running the Show"	7.0/11	3.3/9	November 16, 2011	11.66	#20
346	11	"A Closer Look"	4.6/8	1.9/6	November 23, 2011	7.98	N/A
347	12	"Cult Like"	6.6/10	3.1/9	November 30, 2011	11.05	#9
348	13	"Ticking Time Bomb"	6.8/11	3.3/9	December 7, 2011	11.59	#16
349	14	"Then There Were Five"	6.5/11	3.1/9	December 14, 2011	10.87	#16
350	15	"Loyalties Will Be Broken"	7.3/11	4.0/10	December 18, 2011	13.07	#7
351	16	"Reunion"	5.8/11	3.0/8	December 18, 2011	9.92	#20

=== One World (Season 24, 2012) ===
No. overall	No. in season	Title	Rating/share (household)	Rating/share (18-49)	Original release date	U.S. viewers (millions)	Weekly rank
352	1	"Two Tribes, One Camp, No Rules"	6.3/10	3.1/9	February 15, 2012	10.79	#17
353	2	"Total Dysfunction"	6.0/10	2.8/8	February 22, 2012	10.29	#23
354	3	"One World is Out the Window"	6.2/10	2.9/8	February 29, 2012	10.65	#17
355	4	"Bum-Puzzled"	6.3/10	3.2/9	March 7, 2012	10.78	#12
356	5	"A Bunch of Idiots"	6.2/11	3.0/9	March 14, 2012	10.56	#11
357	6	"Thanks for the Souvenir"	6.2/10	2.8/9	March 21, 2012	10.47	#15
358	7	"The Beauty in a Merge"	5.9/10	2.9/9	March 28, 2012	9.99	#19
359	8	"Just Annihilate Them"	6.1/10	2.8/9	April 4, 2012	10.36	#18
360	9	"Go Out With a Bang"	6.0/10	2.7/8	April 11, 2012	9.91	#17
361	10	"I'm No Dummy"	6.0/9	2.8/9	April 18, 2012	9.96	#14
362	11	"Never Say Die"	5.9/10	2.7/8	April 25, 2012	9.81	#14
363	12	"It's Gonna Be Chaos"	5.7/10	2.6/8	May 2, 2012	9.43	#21
364	13	"It's Human Nature"	6.1/10	2.8/9	May 9, 2012	9.97	#22
365	14	"Perception is Not Always Reality"	5.8/10	2.9/8	May 13, 2012	10.34	#20
366	15	"Reunion"	4.6/8	2.3/6	May 13, 2012	7.72	TBA

=== Philippines (Season 25, 2012) ===
No. overall	No. in season	Title	Rating/share (household)	Rating/share (18–49)	Original release date	U.S. viewers (millions)	Weekly rank
367	1	"Survivor Smacked Me in the Chops"	6.6/11	3.2/10	September 19, 2012	11.37	#8
368	2	"Don't be Blinded by the Headlights"	6.3/10	3.1/9	September 26, 2012	10.31	#24
369	3	"This Isn't a 'We' Game"	6.4/10	3.0/9	October 3, 2012	10.38	#16
370	4	"Create a Little Chaos"	6.4/10	2.8/8	October 10, 2012	9.82	#22
371	5	"Got My Swag Back"	6.3/10	2.8/8	October 17, 2012	10.43	#17
372	6	"Down and Dirty"	6.3/10	2.8/8	October 24, 2012	10.23	#22
373	7	"Not the Only Actor on This Island"	6.1/10	2.5/8	October 31, 2012	9.83	#24
374	8	"Dead Man Walking"	6.4/10	2.8/8	November 7, 2012	10.31	#16
375	9	"Little Miss Perfect"	6.1/10	2.6/8	November 14, 2012	10.06	#18
376	10	"Whiners are Wieners"	4.2/7	2.3/8	November 21, 2012	9.37	#21
377	11	"Hell Hath Frozen Over"	6.4/10	2.7/8	November 28, 2012	10.37	#20
378	12	"Shot Into Smithereens"	6.4/10	2.9/8	December 5, 2012	10.64	#13
379	13	"Gouge My Eyes Out"	6.3/10	2.8/8	December 12, 2012	10.37	#17
380	14	"Million Dollar Question"	6.8/10	3.2/8	December 16, 2012	11.46	#12
381	15	"Reunion"	N/A	2.3/–	December 16, 2012	8.77	N/A

=== Caramoan (Season 26, 2013) ===
No. overall	No. in season	Title	Rating/share (household)	Rating/share (18-49)	Original release date	U.S. viewers (millions)	Weekly rank
382	1	"She Annoys Me Greatly"	5.5/9	2.4/7	February 13, 2013	8.94	#18
383	2	"Honey Badger"	5.7/9	2.4/7	February 20, 2013	9.32	#22
384	3	"There's Gonna Be Hell to Pay"	5.9/9	2.6/8	February 27, 2013	9.17	#18
385	4	"Kill or Be Killed"	5.9/9	2.6/7	March 6, 2013	9.58	#11
386	5	"Persona Non Grata"	5.9/10	2.7/8	March 13, 2013	9.89	#14
387	6	"Operation Thunder Dome"	5.8/10	2.6/8	March 20, 2013	9.79	#10
388	7	"Tubby Lunchbox"	5.5/9	2.5/7	March 27, 2013	9.43	#13
389	8	"Blindside Time"	5.7/9	2.5/7	April 3, 2013	9.25	#22
390	9	"Cut Off the Head of the Snake"	5.7/9	2.6/8	April 10, 2013	9.38	#20
391	10	"Zipping Over the Cuckoo’s Nest"	6.0/10	2.7/8	April 17, 2013	9.99	#12
392	11	"Come Over to the Dark Side"	5.9/10	2.9/8	April 24, 2013	10.31	#5
393	12	"The Beginning of the End"	5.8/10	2.4/8	May 1, 2013	9.25	#19
394	13	"Don't Say Anything About My Mom"	5.7/9	2.6/8	May 8, 2013	9.51	#18
395	14	"Last Push"	5.8/10	2.7/8	May 12, 2013	10.16	#15
396	15	"Reunion"	4.9/8	2.2/6	May 12, 2013	8.13	#25

=== Blood vs. Water (Season 27, 2013) ===
No. overall	No. in season	Title	CBS recap	Rating/share (household)	Rating/share (18-49)	Original release date	U.S. viewers (millions)	Weekly rank
397	1	"Blood Is Thicker Than Anything"	Recap	5.9/10	2.6/8	September 18, 2013	9.73	#12
398	2	"Rule In Chaos"	Recap	5.8/10	2.4/7	September 25, 2013	9.54	#24
399	3	"Opening Pandora's Box"	Recap	6.3/10	2.7/8	October 2, 2013	10.16	#21
400	4	"One Armed Dude and Three Moms"	Recap	5.9/10	2.5/7	October 9, 2013	9.60	#19
401	5	"The Dead Can Still Talk"	Recap	6.0/10	2.6/8	October 16, 2013	10.11	#18
402	6	"One-Man Wrecking Ball"	Recap	5.8/9	2.4/7	October 23, 2013	9.52	#22
403	7	"Swoop In For The Kill"	Recap	5.6/9	2.3/7	October 30, 2013	9.00	#25
404	8	"Skin of My Teeth"	Recap	5.5/9	2.5/7	November 6, 2013	9.29	#21
405	9	"My Brother's Keeper"	Recap	6.0/9	2.5/7	November 13, 2013	9.87	#20
406	10	"Big Bad Wolf"	Recap	5.9/9	2.5/7	November 20, 2013	10.18	#20
407	11	"Gloves Come Off"	Recap	5.1/9	2.2/7	November 27, 2013	8.81	#22
408	12	"Rustle Feathers"	Recap	6.2/10	2.6/8	December 4, 2013	10.63	#12
409	13	"Out On a Limb"	Recap	6.0/10	2.5/8	December 11, 2013	9.92	#16
410	14	"It's My Night"	Recap	5.8/9	2.6/7	December 15, 2013	10.19	#14
411	15	"Reunion"	N/A	4.5/8	1.9/5	December 15, 2013	7.46	N/A

=== Cagayan (Season 28, 2014) ===
No. overall	No. in season	Title	CBS recap	Rating/share (18-49)	Original release date	U.S. viewers (millions)	Weekly rank
412	1	"Hot Girl With a Grudge"	Recap	2.4/7	February 26, 2014	9.40	20
413	2	"Cops-R-Us"	Recap	2.4/8	March 5, 2014	9.58	18
414	3	"Our Time to Shine"	Recap	2.5/8	March 12, 2014	9.66	16
415	4	"Odd One Out"	Recap	2.5/8	March 19, 2014	9.46	14
416	5	"We Found Our Zombies"	Recap	2.3/7	March 26, 2014	9.85	12
417	6	"Head of the Snake"	Recap	2.3/7	April 2, 2014	9.48	17
418	7	"Mad Treasure Hunt"	Recap	2.4/7	April 9, 2014	9.62	14
419	8	"Bag of Tricks"	Recap	2.3/8	April 16, 2014	9.35	10
420	9	"Sitting In My Spy Shack"	Recap	2.3/7	April 23, 2014	9.43	13
421	10	"Chaos Is My Friend"	Recap	2.3/7	April 30, 2014	9.70	14
422	11	"Havoc to Wreak"	Recap	2.4/8	May 7, 2014	9.91	12
423	12	"Straw That Broke The Camel's Back"	Recap	2.6/9	May 14, 2014	9.93	12
424	13	"It's Do or Die"	Recap	2.6/8	May 21, 2014	9.58	8
425	14	"Reunion"	N/A	1.9/6	May 21, 2014	7.14	14

=== San Juan del Sur (Season 29, 2014) ===
No. overall	No. in season	Title	CBS recap	Rating/share (18-49)	Original release date	U.S. viewers (millions)	Weekly rank
426	1	"Suck It Up and Survive"	Recap	2.7/9	September 24, 2014	9.75	20
427	2	"Method To This Madness"	Recap	2.4/9	October 1, 2014	9.49	24
428	3	"Actions vs. Accusations"	Recap	2.5/8	October 8, 2014	9.65	20
429	4	"We're a Hot Mess"	Recap	2.3/8	October 15, 2014	9.33	24
430	5	"Blood is Blood"	Recap	2.2/7	October 22, 2014	9.22	<25
431	6	"Make Some Magic Happen"	Recap	2.2/7	October 29, 2014	9.07	24
432	7	"Million Dollar Decision"	Recap	2.3/7	November 5, 2014	9.31	19
433	8	"Wrinkle In the Plan"	Recap	2.3/7	November 12, 2014	9.51	24
434	9	"Gettin' to Crunch Time"	Recap	2.4/8	November 19, 2014	9.85	21
435	10	"This Is Where We Build Trust"	Recap	2.1/7	November 26, 2014	8.90	18
436	11	"Kind Of Like Cream Cheese"	Recap	2.1/7	December 3, 2014	8.71	TBA
437	12	"Still Holdin' On"	Recap	2.1/7	December 3, 2014	8.71	TBA
438	13	"Let's Make a Move"	Recap	2.4/8	December 10, 2014	9.47	TBA
439	14	"This Is My Time"	Recap	2.4/8	December 17, 2014	9.79	TBA
440	15	"Reunion"	Recap	1.8/8	December 17, 2014	7.31	TBA

=== Worlds Apart (Season 30, 2015) ===
No. overall	No. in season	Title	CBS recap	Rating/share (18-49)	Original release date	U.S. viewers (millions)	Weekly rank
441	1	"It's Survivor Warfare"	Recap	2.4/7	February 25, 2015	10.04	12
442	2	"It Will Be My Revenge"	Recap	2.3/7	March 4, 2015	9.77	13
443	3	"Crazy is as Crazy Does"	Recap	2.2/8	March 11, 2015	9.25	20
444	4	"Winner Winner, Chicken Dinner"	Recap	2.3/7	March 18, 2015	9.62	9
445	5	"We're Finally Playing Some Survivor"	Recap	2.3/7	March 18, 2015	9.62	9
446	6	"Odd Woman Out"	Recap	2.3/8	March 25, 2015	9.64	10
447	7	"The Line Will Be Drawn Tonight"	Recap	2.2/8	April 1, 2015	9.59	7
448	8	"Keep It Real"	Recap	2.5/8	April 8, 2015	9.84	12
449	9	"Livin' On the Edge"	Recap	2.2/8	April 15, 2015	9.35	12
450	10	"Bring the Popcorn"	Recap	2.4/8	April 22, 2015	10.19	10
451	11	"Survivor Russian Roulette"	Recap	2.2/8	April 29, 2015	9.25	11
452	12	"Holding on for Dear Life"	Recap	2.1/8	May 6, 2015	9.22	9
453	13	"My Word Is My Bond"	Recap	2.3/8	May 13, 2015	9.61	7
454	14	"It's A Fickle, Fickle Game"	Recap	2.3/7	May 20, 2015	9.74	5
455	15	"Reunion"	TBA	1.8/6	May 20, 2015	7.21	14

=== Cambodia (Season 31, 2015) ===
No. overall	No. in season	Title	CBS recap	Rating/share (18–49)	Original release date	U.S. viewers (millions)	Weekly rank
456	1	"Second Chance"	Recap	2.5/8	September 23, 2015	9.70	18
457	2	"Survivor MacGyver"	Recap	2.4/9	September 30, 2015	9.43	14
458	3	"We Got a Rat"	Recap	2.0/7	October 7, 2015	9.07	17
459	4	"What's the Beef?"	Recap	2.2/8	October 14, 2015	9.07	13
460	5	"A Snake in the Grass"	Recap	2.1/8	October 21, 2015	9.10	15
461	6	"Bunking with the Devil"	Recap	2.1/7	October 28, 2015	8.48	16
462	7	"Play to Win"	Recap	2.0/7	November 4, 2015	8.80	16
463	8	"You Call, We'll Haul"	Recap	2.1/7	November 11, 2015	9.00	15
464	9	"Witches Coven"	Recap	2.1/7	November 18, 2015	9.05	17
465	10	"Like Selling Your Soul to the Devil"	Recap	1.8/6	November 25, 2015	8.12	17
466	11	"My Wheels are Spinning"	Recap	1.8/6	November 25, 2015	8.12	17
467	12	"Tiny Little Shanks to the Heart"	Recap	2.1/7	December 2, 2015	9.42	14
468	13	"Villains Have More Fun"	Recap	2.3/8	December 9, 2015	9.91	9
469	14	"Lie, Cheat and Steal"	Recap	2.2/8	December 16, 2015	9.45	8
470	15	"Reunion"	N/A	1.7/6	December 16, 2015	6.49	14

=== Kaôh Rōng (Season 32, 2016) ===
No. overall	No. in season	Title	CBS recap	Rating/share (18-49)	Original release date	U.S. viewers (millions)	Weekly rank
471	1	"I'm a Mental Giant"	Recap	1.9/7	February 17, 2016	8.30	13
472	2	"Kindergarten Camp"	Recap	1.9/6	February 24, 2016	8.39	15
473	3	"The Circle of Life"	Recap	2.2/8	March 2, 2016	9.24	5
474	4	"Signed, Sealed and Delivered"	Recap	2.1/8	March 9, 2016	9.26	7
475	5	"The Devils We Know"	Recap	2.1/8	March 16, 2016	9.50	7
476	6	"Play or Go Home"	Recap	2.1/8	March 23, 2016	9.31	9
477	7	"It's Merge Time"	Recap	2.0/7	March 30, 2016	9.16	8
478	8	"The Jocks vs. the Pretty People"	Recap	1.9/7	April 6, 2016	8.98	10
479	9	"It's Psychological Warfare"	Recap	1.9/7	April 13, 2016	8.39	7
480	10	"I'm Not Here to Make Good Friends"	Recap	2.0/7	April 20, 2016	9.27	4
481	11	"It’s a ‘Me’ Game, Not a ‘We’ Game"	Recap	2.1/8	April 27, 2016	9.47	3
482	12	"Now’s the Time to Start Scheming"	Recap	2.1/8	May 4, 2016	9.48	4
483	13	"With Me or Not With Me"	Recap	2.1/8	May 11, 2016	9.51	3
484	14	"Not Going Down Without a Fight"	Recap	2.1/7	May 18, 2016	9.54	5
485	15	"Reunion"	N/A	1.5/5	May 18, 2016	6.42	18

=== Millennials vs. Gen X (Season 33, 2016) ===
No. overall	No. in season	Title	CBS recap	Rating/share (18-49)	Original release date	U.S. viewers (millions)	Weekly rank
486	1	"May the Best Generation Win"	Recap	2.3/8	September 21, 2016	9.46	14
487	2	"Love Goggles"	Recap	2.1/8	September 28, 2016	9.16	16
488	3	"Your Job is Recon"	Recap	1.9/7	October 5, 2016	8.60	15
489	4	"Who's the Sucker at the Table?"	Recap	2.0/8	October 12, 2016	9.06	18
490	5	"Idol Search Party"	Recap	1.9/7	October 19, 2016	8.59	17
491	6	"The Truth Works Well"	Recap	1.9/7	October 26, 2016	8.30	23
492	7	"I Will Destroy You"	Recap	1.6/5	November 2, 2016	6.93	22
493	8	"I'm the Kingpin"	Recap	1.9/7	November 9, 2016	8.81	14
494	9	"Still Throwin' Punches"	Recap	1.8/6	November 16, 2016	8.49	17
495	10	"Million Dollar Gamble"	Recap, part 1 Recap, part 2	1.5/5	November 23, 2016	7.74	16
496	11	"About to Have a Rumble"	Recap	1.9/7	November 30, 2016	8.86	16
497	12	"Slayed the Survivor Dragon"	Recap	1.7/6	December 7, 2016	8.50	16
498	13	"I'm Going for a Million Bucks"	Recap	1.9/7	December 14, 2016	9.09	13
499	14	"Reunion"	N/A	1.3/5	December 14, 2016	6.40	13

=== Game Changers (Season 34, 2017) ===
No. overall	No. in season	Title	CBS recap	Rating/share (18-49)	Original release date	U.S. viewers (millions)	Weekly rank
500	1	"The Stakes Have Been Raised"	Recap	1.7/6	March 8, 2017	7.64	15
501	2	"Survivor Jackpot"	Recap	1.7/7	March 15, 2017	7.87	11
502	3	"The Tables Have Turned"	Recap	1.7/7	March 22, 2017	8.10	10
503	4	"Dirty Deed"	Recap	1.8/7	March 29, 2017	8.26	15
504	5	"Vote Early, Vote Often"	Recap	1.7/7	April 5, 2017	8.40	14
505	6	"What Happened on Exile, Stays on Exile"	Recap	1.7/7	April 12, 2017	8.31	8
506	7	"There's a New Sheriff in Town"	Recap	1.7/7	April 19, 2017	7.92	11
507	8	"A Line Drawn in Concrete"	Recap	1.8/7	April 26, 2017	8.49	9
508	9	"Reinventing How This Game Is Played"	Recap	1.8/8	May 3, 2017	8.26	12
509	10	"It Is Not a High Without a Low"	Recap	1.7/7	May 10, 2017	8.30	11
510	11	"Parting Is Such Sweet Sorrow"	Recap	1.7/7	May 17, 2017	8.27	8
511	12	"No Good Deed Goes Unpunished"	Recap	1.9/8	May 24, 2017	8.48	6
512	13	"Reunion"	N/A	1.3/5	May 24, 2017	5.84	15

=== Heroes vs. Healers vs. Hustlers (Season 35, 2017) ===
No. overall	No. in season	Title	CBS recap	Rating/share (18-49)	Original release date	U.S. viewers (millions)	Weekly rank
513	1	"I'm Not Crazy, I'm Confident"	Recap	1.8/7	September 27, 2017	8.33	23
514	2	"I'm a Wild Banshee"	Recap	1.6/6	October 4, 2017	8.15	20
515	3	"My Kisses Are Very Private"	Recap	1.7/7	October 11, 2017	8.02	19
516	4	"I Don't Like Having Snakes Around"	Recap	1.8/7	October 18, 2017	8.12	17
517	5	"The Past Will Eat You Alive"	Recap	1.7/7	October 25, 2017	8.22	17
518	6	"This is Why You Play Survivor"	Recap	1.6/6	November 1, 2017	7.69	20
519	7	"Get to Gettin'"	Recap	1.6/6	November 8, 2017	7.82	21
520	8	"Playing with the Devil"	Recap	1.7/6	November 15, 2017	8.85	18
521	9	"Fear of the Unknown"	Recap	1.4/5	November 22, 2017	7.42	15
522	10	"Buy One, Get One Free"	Recap, part 1 Recap, part 2	1.8/7	November 29, 2017	8.27	18
523	11	"Not Going to Roll Over and Die"	Recap	1.8/7	December 6, 2017	8.96	11
524	12	"The Survivor Devil"	Recap	1.8/7	December 13, 2017	8.74	11
525	13	"Million Dollar Night"	Recap	1.9/8	December 20, 2017	8.70	8
526	14	"Reunion Special"	N/A	1.2/5	December 20, 2017	5.97	17

=== Ghost Island (Season 36, 2018) ===
No. overall	No. in season	Title	CBS recap	Rating/share (18–49	Original release date	U.S. viewers (millions)	Weekly rank
527	1	"Can You Reverse the Curse?"	Recap, part 1 Recap, part 2	1.7/7	February 28, 2018	8.19	14
528	2	"Only Time Will Tell"	Recap	1.7/7	March 7, 2018	8.23	14
529	3	"Trust Your Gut"	N/A	1.7/7	March 14, 2018	8.39	11
530	4	"A Diamond in the Rough"	N/A	1.8/7	March 21, 2018	8.61	6
531	5	"Fate is the Homie"	N/A	1.7/7	March 28, 2018	8.15	15
532	6	"Gotta Risk it For the Biscuit"	N/A	1.7/7	April 4, 2018	8.42	11
533	7	"Fear Keeps You Sharp"	N/A	1.6/7	April 11, 2018	7.97	10
534	8	"The Sea Slug Slugger"	N/A	1.6/7	April 18, 2018	7.73	12
535	9	"It's Like the Perfect Crime"	N/A	1.6/7	April 25, 2018	7.81	9
536	10	"The Finish Line Is In Sight"	N/A	1.5/7	May 2, 2018	7.84	14
537	11	"A Giant Game of Bumper Cars"	N/A	1.5/7	May 9, 2018	7.74	13
538	12	"Always Be Moving"	N/A	1.5/6	May 16, 2018	7.54	11
539	13	"It Is Game Time Kids"	N/A	1.4/6	May 23, 2018	7.31	7
540	14	"Reunion Special"	N/A	0.8/3	May 23, 2018	4.62	23

=== David vs. Goliath (Season 37, 2018) ===
No. overall	No. in season	Title	Rating/share (18–49)	Weekly rank	Original release date	U.S. viewers (millions)
541	1	"Appearances are Deceiving"	1.7/7	N/A	September 26, 2018	7.83
542	2	"The Chicken Has Flown the Coop"	1.5/7	N/A	October 3, 2018	7.27
543	3	"I Am Goliath Strong"	1.6/7	19	October 10, 2018	7.65
544	4	"Time to Bring About the Charmpocalypse"	1.4/6	22	October 17, 2018	7.21
545	5	"Jackets and Eggs"	1.5/6	23	October 24, 2018	7.37
546	6	"Aren't Brochachos Just Adorable?"	1.3/6	24	October 31, 2018	7.06
547	7	"There's Gonna Be Tears Shed"	1.6/7	15	November 7, 2018	7.69
548	8	"You Get What You Give"	1.4/6	25	November 14, 2018	7.20
549	9	"Breadth-First Search"	1.3/6	18	November 21, 2018	7.09
550	10	"Tribal Lines Are Blurred"	1.6/7	18	November 28, 2018	7.60
551	11	"So Smart They're Dumb"	1.5/7	18	December 5, 2018	7.51
552	12	"Are You Feeling Lucky?"	1.5/7	12	December 12, 2018	7.77
553	13	"With Great Power Comes Great Responsibility"	1.5/7	6	December 19, 2018	7.72
554	14	"Reunion Special"	1.0/5	19	December 19, 2018	5.17

=== Edge of Extinction (Season 38, 2019) ===
No. overall	No. in season	Title	Rating/share (18-49)	Weekly rank	Original release date	U.S. viewers (millions)
555	1	"It Smells Like Success"	1.6/7	15	February 20, 2019	7.75
556	2	"One of Us is Going to Win the War"	1.5/7	14	February 27, 2019	7.07
557	3	"Betrayals Are Going to Get Exposed"	1.5/6	14	March 6, 2019	7.25
558	4	"I Need a Dance Partner"	1.5/7	13	March 13, 2019	7.53
559	5	"It's Like the Worst Cocktail Party Ever"	1.3/6	8	March 20, 2019	7.05
560	6	"There's Always a Twist"	1.6/8	9	March 27, 2019	7.75
561	7	"I'm the Puppet Master"	1.5/7	15	April 3, 2019	7.41
562	8	"Y'all Making Me Crazy"	1.5/7	7	April 10, 2019	7.59
563	9	"Blood of a Blindside"	1.5/8	5	April 17, 2019	7.89
564	10	"Fasten Your Seatbelts"	1.5/7	10	April 24, 2019	7.50
565	11	"Awkward"	1.4/7	10	May 1, 2019	7.34
566	12	"Idol or Bust"	1.5/7	11	May 8, 2019	7.28
567	13	"I See The Million Dollars"	1.5/7	11	May 15, 2019	7.21
568	14	"Reunion Special"	0.9/4	N/A	May 15, 2019	4.64

=== Island of the Idols (Season 39, 2019) ===
No. overall	No. in season	Title	Rating/share (18-49)	Weekly rank	Original release date	U.S. viewers (millions)
569	1	"I Vote You Out and That's It"	1.3/6	18	September 25, 2019	6.29
570	2	"YOLO, Let's Play!"	1.2/6	22	October 2, 2019	6.57
571	3	"Honesty Would Be Chill"	1.2/6	23	October 9, 2019	6.51
572	4	"Plan Z"	1.4/7	17	October 16, 2019	6.91
573	5	"Don't Bite the Hand That Feeds You"	1.3/6	21	October 23, 2019	6.82
574	6	"Suck It Up Buttercup"	1.2/6	21	October 30, 2019	6.37
575	7	"I Was Born at Night, But Not Last Night"	1.3/6	TBA	November 6, 2019	6.82
576	8	"We Made It to the Merge!"	1.1/6	TBA	November 13, 2019	6.07
577	9	"Two for the Price of One"	1.2/6	TBA	November 20, 2019	6.63
578	10	"Bring on the Bacon"	1.1/6	TBA	November 27, 2019	6.48
579	11	"A Very Simple Plan"	1.2/6	TBA	December 4, 2019	6.86
580	12	"Just Go For It"	1.2/7	TBA	December 11, 2019	6.82
581	13	"Mama, Look at Me Now"	1.2/6	TBA	December 18, 2019	6.52
582	14	"Reunion Special"	0.9/5	TBA	December 18, 2019	4.61

=== Winners at War (Season 40, 2020) ===
No. overall	No. in season	Title	Rating/share (18-49)	Original release date	U.S. viewers (millions)
583	1	"Greatest of the Greats"	1.3/7	February 12, 2020	6.68
584	2	"It's Like a Survivor Economy"	1.4/7	February 19, 2020	7.16
585	3	"Out for Blood"	1.4/7	February 26, 2020	7.14
586	4	"I Like Revenge"	1.4/7	March 4, 2020	7.08
587	5	"The Buddy System on Steroids"	1.4/6	March 11, 2020	6.91
588	6	"Quick on the Draw"	1.6/7	March 18, 2020	7.83
589	7	"We're in the Majors"	1.7/8	March 25, 2020	8.18
590	8	"This is Where the Battle Begins"	1.6/7	April 1, 2020	8.23
591	9	"War is Not Pretty"	1.5/6	April 8, 2020	7.85
592	10	"The Full Circle"	1.6/7	April 15, 2020	8.14
593	11	"This Is Extortion"	1.5/6	April 22, 2020	8.16
594	12	"Friendly Fire"	1.5/6	April 29, 2020	8.08
595	13	"The Penultimate Step of the War"	1.4/5	May 6, 2020	7.57
596	14	"It All Boils Down to This"	1.6/7	May 13, 2020	7.94
