= Zhelin Reservoir =

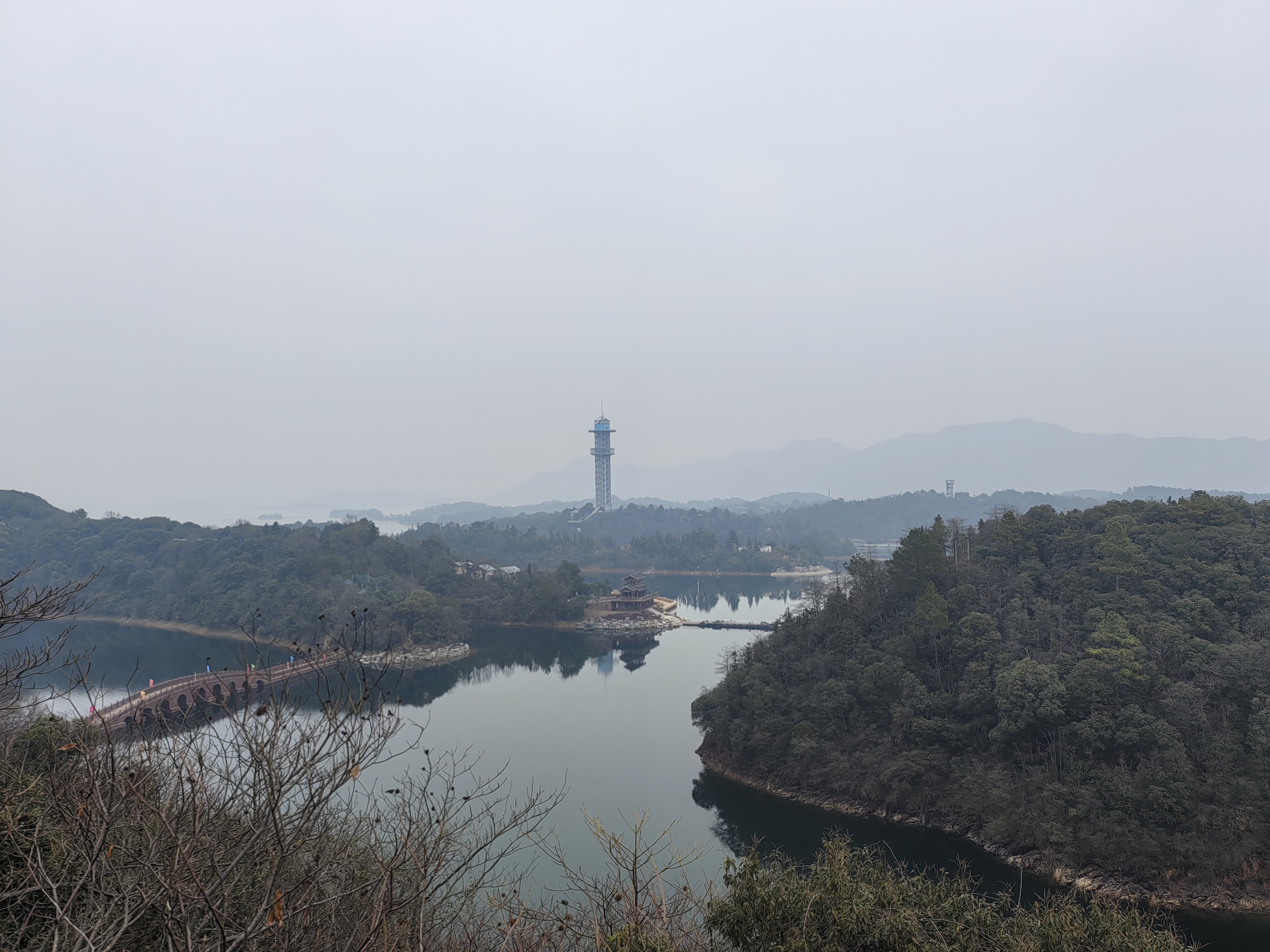

- Location within China
- Location: Jiujiang, China
- Coordinates: 29.29°N 115.34°E
- Type: reservoir and tourism attraction
- Basin countries: China
- Surface area: 308 km^{2} (119 sq mi)
- Average depth: 45 m (148 ft)
- Water volume: 8 billion cubic metres (6.5×10^{6} acre⋅ft)
- Frozen: No
- Islands: 997, major ones 13

The Zhelin Reservoir (Chinese: 柘林湖; pinyin: Zhèlín Hú, Gan: Chā-līm fîkhú), also named Mount Lu West Sea (Chinese: 庐山西海), is a reservoir located in the counties of Yongxiu, Wuning, and Xiushui in Jiujiang, China. It is 50 kilometers to the south-west of Mount Lu and has a total area of 308 square kilometers. The reservoir is the largest in Jiangxi province, with a storage capacity of 7,920,000,000 cubic metres.

Although the dam is located in an area of low seismic activity, after the impounding of the Zhelin Reservoir, seismic activity increased markedly.

Zhelin Reservoir is named after Zhelin Town, the site of the largest hydropower earth dam blocking project in Asia. It has an average water depth of 45 meters and a visibility of more than 9 meters, rich in wild fish species, like Culter alburnus, Red-tailed Xenocypris, Xenocypris davidi, and Siniperca chuatsi.

The American reality program Survivor filmed its fifteenth season, Survivor: China, on islands in the reservoir in June–August 2007. Survivor host Jeff Probst claimed that this was the first American television series to be filmed entirely within China.
