= Rivas, Nicaragua =

Rivas
- Municipality and City
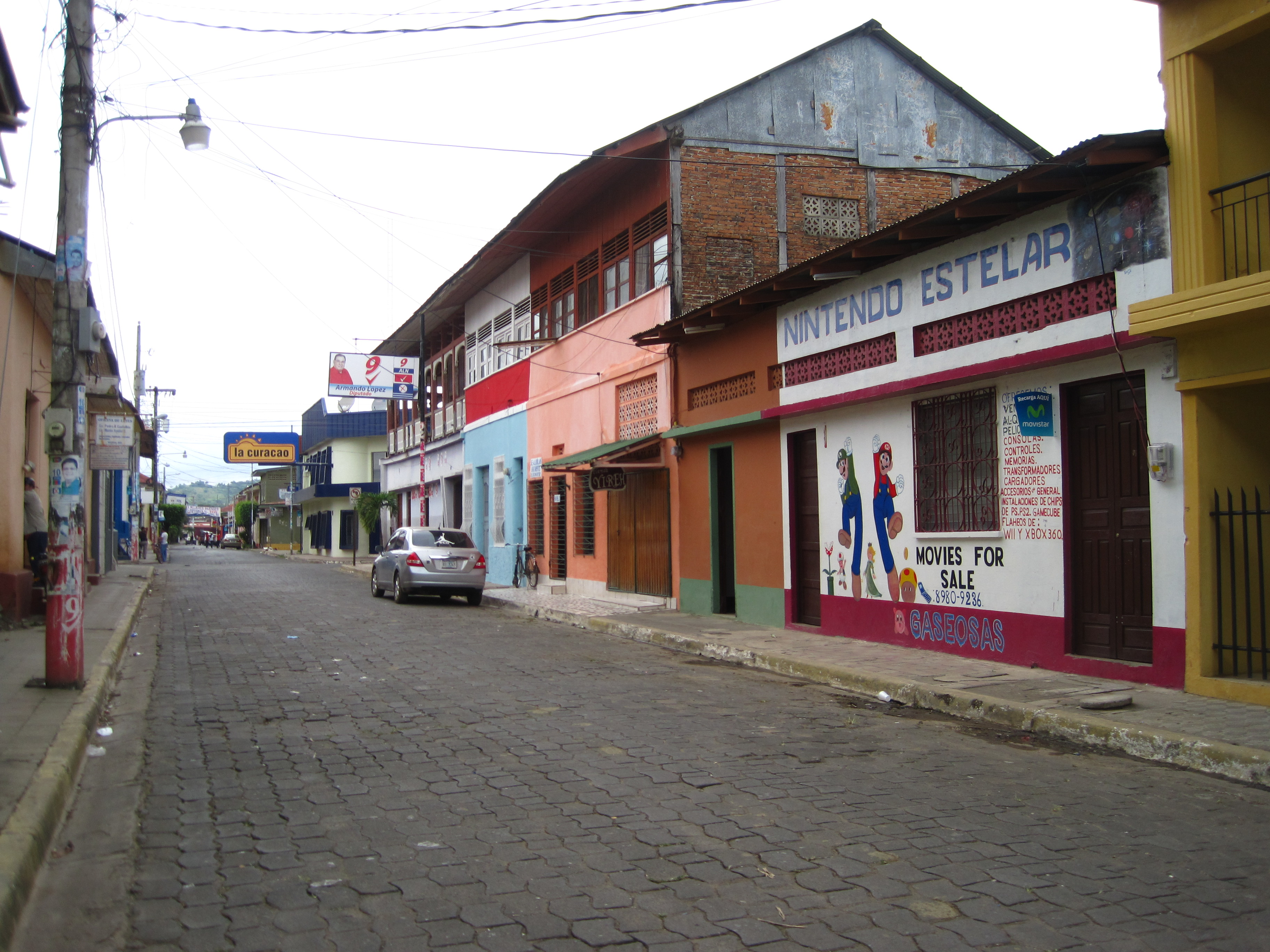
- Street in Rivas, Nicaragua.

- Location in Nicaragua
- Coordinates: 11°26′21.51″N 85°49′37.19″W
- Country: Nicaragua
- Department: Rivas Department

Area
  - Municipality and City: 281 km^{2} (108 sq mi)

Population (2022 estimate)
  - Municipality and City: 55,739
  - Density: 198/km^{2} (514/sq mi)
  - Urban: 35,745
- Demonym: rivense
- Time zone: UTC-6 (Nicaragua Standard Time)
- Climate: Aw

Rivas (Spanish pronunciation: [ˈriβas]) is a city and municipality in southwestern Nicaragua on the Isthmus of the same name. The city proper is the capital of the Department of Rivas and administrative centre for the surrounding municipality of the same name.

== Climate ==
Rivas has a tropical savanna climate (Köppen climate classification Aw) with a short dry season from January to April and a lengthy wet season from May to October. Temperatures remain steady throughout the year with the dry season being slightly cooler and range from 25.5 °C (77.9 °F) in January to 27.7 °C (81.9 °F) in May. The average annual precipitation is 1,345 millimetres (53 in).

Climate data for Rivas, Nicaragua
Month	Jan	Feb	Mar	Apr	May	Jun	Jul	Aug	Sep	Oct	Nov	Dec	Year
Mean daily maximum °C (°F)	28.7 (83.7)	26.6 (79.9)	30.9 (87.6)	31.8 (89.2)	31.7 (89.1)	30.0 (86.0)	29.5 (85.1)	29.8 (85.6)	29.8 (85.6)	29.5 (85.1)	29.1 (84.4)	28.7 (83.7)	29.7 (85.4)
Daily mean °C (°F)	25.5 (77.9)	26.0 (78.8)	27.0 (80.6)	26.4 (79.5)	27.7 (81.9)	26.7 (80.1)	26.4 (79.5)	26.6 (79.9)	26.2 (79.2)	26.3 (79.3)	26.1 (79.0)	25.6 (78.1)	26.4 (79.5)
Mean daily minimum °C (°F)	23.0 (73.4)	23.2 (73.8)	23.9 (75.0)	24.8 (76.6)	24.9 (76.8)	24.3 (75.7)	24.3 (75.7)	24.1 (75.4)	23.6 (74.5)	23.8 (74.8)	23.8 (74.8)	23.4 (74.1)	23.9 (75.1)
Average rainfall mm (inches)	8 (0.3)	4 (0.2)	3 (0.1)	10 (0.4)	172 (6.8)	225 (8.9)	151 (5.9)	181 (7.1)	265 (10.4)	209 (8.2)	87 (3.4)	30 (1.2)	1,345 (52.9)
Average rainy days (≥ 1.0 mm)	2	1	0	1	10	16	14	15	22	17	10	5	113
Mean monthly sunshine hours	229.4	228.8	244.9	231.0	195.3	141.0	148.8	161.2	147.0	173.6	186.0	207.7	2,294.7
Source: Hong Kong Observatory

== Notable people ==
- Erasmo Ramírez, Major League Baseball pitcher.
- Violeta Chamorro, first female president of Nicaragua, was born in Rivas.

== Twin towns - sister cities ==
Rivas is twinned with:

- Galați, Romania
