= Shaba National Reserve =

Protected area in Isiolo County in northern Kenya

- IUCN category II (national park)
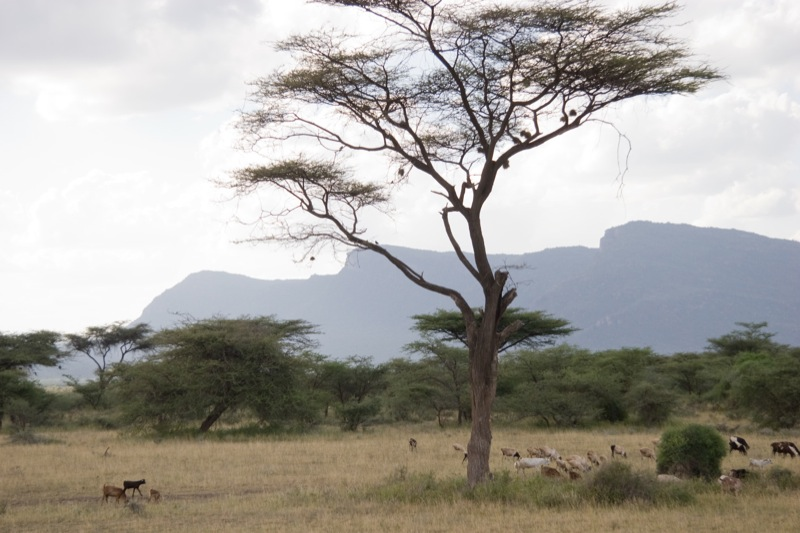

- Location within Kenya
- Location: Kenya, Eastern Province, Isiolo District
- Coordinates: 0°38′24″N 37°49′48″E
- Area: 23,910 hectares (59,100 acres)
- Established: 1974

Shaba National Reserve is a protected area in Isiolo County in northern Kenya to the east of the Samburu and Buffalo Springs national reserves. Together, the three reserves form a large protected area.

The Shaba reserve has dramatic scenery including river-side forests, scattered woodlands and dry grasslands dominated by the Shaba Hill volcano. The plentiful wildlife relies on waterholes and marshes scattered throughout the reserve. Shaba is home to the endangered Grevy's zebra and the rare Williams's lark. Shaba was the setting for the book and film Born Free, for the film Out of Africa and for the reality show Survivor: Africa.

The reserve is a popular destination for tourists, which presents a risk of excess numbers of visitors and growth of the local population around the reserve placing stress on the environment.

== Location ==
Shaba National Reserve was gazetted in 1974. It is administered by the Isiolo County Council. It is just east of Samburu and 70 km (43 mi) to the north of Mount Kenya. The Ewaso Ngiro river runs for 34 km (21 mi) along the northern boundary of the reserve. Annual rainfall is between 250 mm (9.8 in) and 500 mm (20 in). The soils are sandy and of volcanic origin. The reserve is a semi desert, dotted with isolated hills and plentiful springs. Shaba Hill in the south, with its volcanic formations, rises to 2,145 m (7,037 ft) above sea level from the relatively flat surrounding country. The land at the foot of this hill is rugged, containing steep ravines. Away from the river the habitats include umbrella thorn acacia woodland, bush land dominated by commiphora, alkaline grasslands and open areas of lava rock that contain scattered patches of grass and shrubs.

== Fauna ==
Although Shaba is greener than Samburu, game species such as Masai giraffes and Grant's zebras are less common. There are many klipspringer and hyrax in the hills. Aardvarks, warthogs and bat-eared foxes make their homes in domed termite mounds in the shrubland. Common eland, Impala, Grant's gazelle (Bright's sub-species) and gerenuk graze the shrubs, and zebras, Beisa oryx, greater kudu and lesser kudu graze in the grasslands. Shaba is well known for the large lion prides, which rest under thickets of toothbrush trees during the day. At night, predators include the black-backed jackal, striped hyena and spotted hyena The reserve is home to rare species that include the reticulated giraffe, Somali ostrich and the endangered Grevy's zebra. Other fauna include African leopards and elephants.

Bird life is plentiful in Shaba, and similar to that of the Samburu and Buffalo Springs National Reserves. The near-threatened and poorly known Williams's lark is found in the reserve in regions of rocky lava semi-desert with low Barleria shrubs. It has not been observed in any other protected area. The reserve lies on the migration route from the Palearctic for the globally threatened lesser kestrel, a few of whom pass through each year. Shaba is also home to regionally threatened birds that include the sporadically visiting African darter and great egret and the resident white-headed vulture, martial eagle and yellow-billed oxpecker, the last of which is fairly common.

== Media use ==
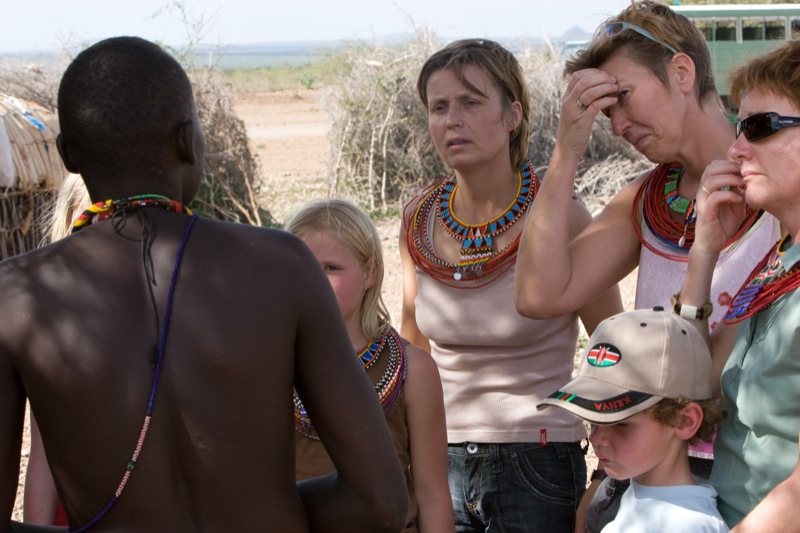
Tourists with guide

The park was made famous by Joy Adamson and the lioness Elsa, subjects of the 1966 film Born Free. In January 1980, Adamson was murdered in the reserve, where there is a monument to her.

The film Out of Africa was shot in part within the reserve, as were various other TV shows and commercials that take advantage of the wildlife and dramatic scenery.

In 2001, two thirds of the park were sealed off for four months while a CBS crew shot episodes of Survivor: Africa, the third season of the American reality television competition series Survivor. Mwandiga Productions paid the Isiolo County Council 18 million shillings to rent out the location, which according to county officials, was more money than what the reserve usually generated from admission fees on an annual basis.

== Ecological concerns ==
Shaba is valuable for its diverse fauna of the Somali–Masai biome, and is important as a home for the poorly known Williams's lark. Neither the reserve, nor the lark's habitat are immediately threatened. Military training in the region to the north of the reserve causes considerable environmental disruption. Levels of grazing, hunting and firewood collection are rising in the areas around the reserve, and sometimes this activity intrudes into the reserve itself. There is no management plan for tourism, and there is a risk that numbers of visitors may rise to unsustainable levels.
