= Bolan =

Bolan may refer to:

== People with the surname Bolan ==
- Betsy Bolan, Survivor contestant
- Florence Bolan, U.S. Secret Service special agent
- George Bolan (1897–1940), American football player
- James S. Bolan (1871–1952), American police commissioner
- Kim Bolan (born 1959), reporter
- Len Bolan (1909–1973), English footballer
- Marc Bolan (1947–1977), British musician and member of the glam rock band T. Rex
- Mike Bolan (1933–2016), Canadian politician
- Nelson Bolan (born 1990), Nevisian cricketer
- Rachel Bolan (born 1966), American musician

=== Fictional characters ===
- Mack Bolan, from The Executioner

== Places ==
- Bolan, Iowa, an unincorporated community in Worth County, Iowa, United States
- Bolan, Iran (disambiguation), several places in Iran
- Bolan District, a former district of Balochistan Province, Pakistan
- Bolan Pass, a location within Balochistan Province, Pakistan

== Other uses ==
- Bolan Medical College, a school in Balochistan Province, Pakistan
- Bolan, a fictional character in the AMC TV series Hell on Wheels season 1
- Bo.lan, Thai restaurant in Bangkok owned and operated by chef Bo Songvisava and her husband

== See also ==
- T-Bolan, Japanese rock band
- Bollan (disambiguation)
- Bolon (disambiguation)
