= Bollan =

Bollan may refer to:

== People ==
- Gary Bollan (b 1973), Scottish football player and manager
- Hilary R. Bollan, chemist at the British Ministry of Defence
- Jim Bollan, Scottish Socialist Party councillor.

== Ships ==
- SS Bollan, a German cargo ship in service 1928-36

== See also ==
- Bolan (disambiguation)
- Bollon, Queensland, Australia
