= Bolon =

Bolon may refer to:

- Bolon, name of several gods in Mayan mythology
- Bolon (eyewear brand), a Chinese eyewear brand
- Bolon (flooring company), a flooring company in Sweden
- Bolon of Macedon (fl. 330 BC) soldier who gave a speech against Philotas, son of one of Alexander's generals
- Lake Bolon, in Russia's Khabarovsk Krai
- Bolon, ethnic group in Mali
- Bolon language, White Bolon and Black Bolon dialects, of the ethnic group in Mali
- Bolon (musical instrument), kind of harp found in Mali
- Comté de Bolon, old name for Boulon, Calvados, France

== Surname and given name ==
The surname Bolon is relatively common in France. Also:

- Andrew Bolon (c. 1826–1855), Indian agent whose murder triggered the Plateau Indian War
- Linda Bolon (born 1948), member of the Ohio House of Representatives
- Bolon B. Turner (1897–1987), Judge of the United States Tax Court

== See also ==
- Bolón (disambiguation):
  - es:Bolón (Yucatán), in Umán Municipality, Mexico
  - es:Monte Bolón or Sierra de Bolón, in Valencia, Spain
  - Bolón Ajau, waterfall with a fourteen-meter drop in Chiapas
  - bolón de verde, Ecuadorian dish of roasted plantains, tacacho
- Bölön, old Hungarian name of Belin, Covasna
- Bolan (disambiguation)
