= Luis Pidal =

Luis Pidal may refer to

- Luis Menéndez Pidal (1861–1915), Spanish artist
- SS Luis Pidal, a Belgian cargo ship in service 1918-25
