= Stephen Fishbach =

American reality TV show participant

- Born: Stephen Andrew Fishbach; January 24, 1979 (age 47); New York City, New York, U.S.
- Education: Yale University
- Occupations: Author; blogger; corporate consultant; podcaster; television personality
- Television: Survivor: Tocantins (Runner-up); Survivor: Cambodia
- Spouse: Julia Lemle (m. 2018)
- Children: 2
- Relatives: Dan Fishbach (brother); Alan C. Greenberg (uncle)

Stephen Andrew Fishbach (born January 24, 1979) is an American digital strategy consultant, writer, and reality television show participant, widely known for competing on the reality TV show Survivor. Fishbach finished as the runner-up on Survivor: Tocantins and finished in ninth place on Survivor: Cambodia. He formerly blogged for People Magazine and co-hosts the Survivor Know-It-Alls podcast alongside Rob Cesternino.

== Survivor ==
=== Survivor: Tocantins ===
Fishbach was cast in the eighteenth season of the American television series Survivor. He was initially a member of the Jalapao tribe, where he quickly made a lasting alliance with J.T. Thomas and Tamara "Taj" Johnson-George. Although he and his alliance were down in numbers after the two tribes merged, they were able to take advantage of the Timbira tribe's dysfunction and general distrust of each other and avoid being voted out. Fishbach won individual immunity at Final Six. He finished as runner-up, losing to Thomas and receiving zero votes from the jury.

=== Survivor: Cambodia ===
In 2015, Fishbach returned for the thirty-first season of the show after fans voted for him to participate in it. He was originally on the Bayon tribe, where he allied with eventual winner Jeremy Collins. Although he was targeted early, a tribe swap in episode three improved his position in the game. After the tribes merged Fishbach frequently tried targeting fan-favorite and challenge beast Joe Anglim. At the Final 11 immunity challenge, Fishbach gave up his chance at immunity and won a secret advantage: the steal-a-vote. At the Final Ten Tribal Council, he received the majority of the votes but was saved when Jeremy used his hidden immunity idol on him. At the Final Nine Tribal Council, he used his advantage and stole Anglim's vote. He split his votes, voting once for Anglim and once for Abi-Maria Gomes; however, his former ally Spencer Bledsoe had flipped on him and voted against him. Fishbach was eliminated in ninth place with a 4–3–2 vote. At the finale he cast his jury vote for Jeremy, who received all ten of the jury members' votes.

== Career ==
Fishbach began blogging for People Magazine in 2009, during the airing of Survivor: Samoa. In this blog he analyzes each episode of Survivor and discusses the strategies and moves of the contestants and awards the player who made the biggest impact of the episode a Fishy Award. Fishbach decided to step down from People in 2019, during the airing of Survivor: Island of the Idols.

In 2012, Fishbach began co-hosting the Survivor Know-It-Alls podcast alongside Rob Cesternino. Each episode Fishbach awards “The Fishy” to one contestant as a recognition of outstanding and remarkable gameplay. Fishbach and Cesternino were asked to compete together in The Amazing Race 31, but were unable to do so because of Fishbach's wedding.

Fishbach's debut novel, Escape!, released in January 2026. Focused on the production of a new competition show and the producers and players that participate in its filming, the novel was inspired by Fishbach's personal experiences as a reality TV contestant.

== Personal life ==
Fishbach was born in New York City in 1979 to parents Constance and Ronald Fishbach. He grew up in Los Angeles where he graduated as valedictorian from Harvard-Westlake School with a 4.25 GPA. He attended Yale University, earning his B.A in English in 2001.

In 2010, Fishbach began dating Survivor: China and Survivor: Heroes vs. Villains contestant, Courtney Yates. The pair broke up in 2013.

Fishbach married Julia Lemle on June 9, 2018, in Washington. The couple had met in 2014 on the social-networking website OkCupid. Their daughter was born in 2020.

== Filmography ==
=== Television ===
Year	Title	Role	Notes
2009	Survivor: Tocantins	Contestant	Runner-up (14 episodes)
2015	Survivor: Cambodia	Contestant	9th place (15 episodes)

== Bibliography ==
=== Novels ===
- —— (2026). Escape!: A Novel (hardcover 1st ed.). E. P. Dutton. ISBN 979-8217048151.

Preceded by Susie Smith	Runner-Up of Survivor; Survivor: Tocantins	Succeeded by Russell Hantz
