= Bulan =

Bulan may refer to:

== Places ==
- Bulan, Kentucky, US
- Bulan, Kermanshah, Iran
- Bulan, Sorsogon, Philippines
- Bulan, Tehran, Iran
- Bulan, Hautes-Pyrénées, France
- Bulan Island, in the Sijori Growth Triangle, Riau Islands Province, Indonesia
- Bulan Island, in the Sulu Archipelago, Philippines
- Bulan, Benishangul-Gumuz Region, Ethiopia

== Other uses ==
- Bulan (Khazar), Khazar ruler of the eighth or ninth century CE, who converted to Judaism
- Bulan, a figure in the mythology of the Bicolano people of the Philippines

== See also ==
- "Buwan", a 2018 song by Juan Karlos Labajo
- Mayari, or Buwan, a moon goddess in Tagalog mythology
