= Bolón =

Bolón may refer to:

- Verónica Bolón-Canedo, Spanish computer scientist
- Peruvian plantain disch tacacho, known in Ecuador as bolón de verde
- Mountain in Elda, Alicante, Spain
- Urban district in Umán Municipality, Mexico
- Waterfall in Chiapas

== See also ==
- Bolon (disambiguation)
