= Jeremy Collins =

American reality television contestant (born 1978)

- Born: April 20, 1978 (age 48)
- Occupations: Firefighter, television personality
- Television: Survivor: San Juan del Sur; Survivor: Cambodia (winner); Survivor: Winners at War; The Traitors 3
- Spouse: Val Collins
- Children: 4

Jeremy Collins (born April 20, 1978) is an American firefighter and reality TV star from Foxborough, Massachusetts. He is the winner of Survivor: Cambodia, and had previously placed tenth on Survivor: San Juan del Sur, where he competed alongside his wife, Val. He finished in eighth place in Survivor: Winners at War.

== Survivor ==
=== San Juan del Sur ===
For Survivor's 29th season, Collins arrived to play the game with his wife Val. However, the next day they were split into different tribes. He was designated to Hunahpu; she was assigned to Coyopa. When he volunteered to participate in the first hero duel, he did not know who his opponent was going to be. To his surprise, his opponent ended up being Val. He won the duel, sending Val to Exile Island. She ended up becoming the second person voted out, much to his chagrin. Despite being in a dysfunctional tribe, Hunahpu dominated in challenges. After the tribe swap Collins remained on Hunahpu with his allies Natalie Anderson and Julie McGee. Despite his alliance being outnumbered by the alliance of Josh Canfield, Reed Kelly, Alec Christy, and Wes Nale, the new Hunahpu tribe avoided going to tribal council by winning the remaining immunity challenges.

After the tribes merged, Collins was targeted by the rival alliance for being a physical threat. However, McGee ended up quitting, which saved him from elimination, and afterwards he won the second individual immunity challenge. However, after Reed Kelly found Keith Nale's hidden immunity idol in his bag, Collins confronted Jon Misch about his possession of an idol, which Misch denied. This resulted in Misch convincing Baylor Wilson, Missy Payne, Jaclyn Schultz and Reed Kelly to blindside Collins, which they successfully did. He placed tenth overall and became the second jury member. At the Final Tribal Council, Collins made a speech advocating for Anderson, praising her as the best player of the season. Collins voted for his former ally Anderson to win, which she did in a 5–2–1 vote.

=== Cambodia ===
Collins was one of 20 past players selected by voters to be part of the show's 31st season and its Second Chance theme (no past winners were cast). Initially, he was part of the Bayon tribe. His wife was pregnant with their third child at the time, and he stated in confessional that he wanted to win for his wife, two daughters, and yet-to-be-born child. In the third episode, he found a clue to the hidden immunity idol, which he found hidden at the next immunity challenge, becoming the second person in the game to find an idol.

Despite two tribe swaps, Collins always remained on Bayon, and the tribes officially merged with 13 players remaining. In the ninth episode, he was able to find another hidden immunity idol and played it on his closest ally Stephen Fishbach in Episode Ten, thus sparing Fishbach from elimination that night. With eight players left in the game, the remaining players got to meet their loved ones. Collins reunited with a visibly pregnant Val, who told him that she was going to have a baby boy this time. However, Collins vowed not to tell anyone else the news, since he felt that it might put a target on his back. At the Final six tribal council, he played the other hidden immunity idol on himself, which saved him from elimination that night. At the Final four, Collins won the final immunity challenge, and at the next tribal council, Spencer Bledsoe threatened to support Kelley Wentworth and sway the jury to vote for her if Collins voted him out. Collins honored his alliance with Bledsoe and voted with the majority to make Wentworth the final member of the jury.

At the Final Tribal Council, Collins was praised by Fishbach for his loyalty and playing with honor and integrity. However, Andrew Savage criticized him for skipping arrogantly to the voting booth when he voted out Kimmi Kappenberg, who later chastised him for replacing her with Bledsoe in their alliance. In his final words to the jury, Collins finally revealed to everyone his joy over the knowledge that he was going to be having a son. On December 16, 2015, at the live Reunion, it was announced that Collins won the game with all ten jury votes. Collins was the fourth winner in Survivor history to have received every possible jury vote, following Earl Cole, J.T. Thomas, and John Cochran.

=== Winners at War ===
Collins played for a third time on the series' 40th season, which is the show's first "all-winners" edition. He was originally a member of the Sele tribe. On day 2, he voted with his ally Natalie Anderson but was shocked when Anderson was blindsided. Anderson gave him her Fire Token upon her elimination, which he found the following morning. Collins also gained a Safety without Power advantage from Anderson, who was on Extinction Island. this advantage gave him the power to leave a tribal council before the vote.

At the merge, Collins won the first immunity challenge but ended up having to vote out his close ally Wendell Holland at the merged tribal council. At the final 10, he used his safety without power advantage (the last time he could use it) and left tribal council, which ended up being necessary, as he was targeted by Tony Vlachos's alliance. Collins received votes at the final 9 and 8 but was saved by Vlachos. He was eventually betrayed and blindsided by Vlachos at the final 7. He lost the re-entry duel on day 35 and finished in 8th place.

At the Final Tribal Council, he expressed some anger to Vlachos for betraying him. As a juror, he voted for Anderson to win, but the latter lost to Tony, who became the second two-time winner in Survivor history.

== Additional television appearances ==
In 2016, Collins appeared in a special episode of The Price Is Right which featured multiple former Survivor contestants competing on the show. The episode aired on May 23, 2016.

In 2025, Collins appeared in season three of The Traitors.

== Personal life ==
Collins grew up with six siblings. As an adult, he got to play professional football in the PIFL, even though he never played a down of college football. His wife Val is a police officer with the Foxborough (MA) Police Department, while he is a firefighter for the Cambridge (MA) Fire Department. Together they have two daughters, Jordyn (born November 12, 2002) and Camryn (born March 7, 2006), and two sons, Remy (born December 21, 2015) and Lenyx (born June 16, 2017).

== Filmography ==
=== Television ===
Year	Title	Role	Notes
2014	Survivor: San Juan del Sur — Blood vs. Water	Contestant	Eliminated; 10th place
2015	Survivor: Cambodia — Second Chance	Contestant	Winner
2016	The Price Is Right	Contestant	1 episode
2020	Survivor: Winners at War	Contestant	Eliminated; 8th place
2025	The Traitors 3	Contestant	Banished; 19th place

Preceded by Mike Holloway	Winner of Survivor; Survivor: Cambodia	Succeeded by Michele Fitzgerald
