= Dan Fishbach =

American theater director and producer

- Born: Daniel Fishbach
- Education: Kenyon College
- Occupation(s): Theater director/producer Professor
- Employer: University of Southern California
- Relatives: Alan C. Greenberg (uncle); Stephen Fishbach (brother)

Dan Fishbach is an American theater director and producer. He was the Executive Director of The Groundlings Theater in Los Angeles from 2006 to 2008.

== Career ==
Fishbach holds a degree from Kenyon College in Ohio and attended the National Theater Institute in Connecticut. He was formerly the head of Performing Arts at Los Angeles' Harvard-Westlake School.

During Fishbach's tenure at The Groundlings, the improv company signed a New Media deal with Sony for short digital sketches.

Fishbach's directing credits include One Night Stand: An Improvised Musical, produced by Marc E. Platt, Executive Producer of Wicked (musical). The show premiered at the Edinburgh Festival Fringe in 2007. Other credits include Steven Dietz's Private Eyes, Nicky Silver's The Maiden's Prayer, Spring Awakening, Company, Chicago, Bat Boy: The Musical, South Pacific, The Glass Menagerie, The Prime of Miss Jean Brodie, and Little Shop of Horrors. In 2013, he collaborated with James Rado on a production of HAIR that included new scenes by the author. Fishbach's company Page One Productions produced Tim Crouch's play An Oak Tree at The Odyssey Theatre in Los Angeles, featuring Jason Alexander, Alan Cumming, Alanis Morissette, Peter Gallagher and Wendie Malick. In 2015, he directed Stephen Sondheim and John Weidman's musical Assassins in Los Angeles. For that production, he was nominated by BroadwayWorld.com for Best Director. In 2017 he directed the musical Jacques Brel is Alive and Well and Living in Paris in Los Angeles.

Fishbach is the co-founder of the Los Angeles Musical Theatre Studio, a training ground for musical theatre performers. He is currently on the faculty at The University of Southern California School of Dramatic Arts. He has taught courses at Oklahoma City University, Cal Poly Pomona, Santa Monica College, and the American Musical and Dramatic Academy, where he developed and taught courses in the History of Musical Theatre. He is also co-president of Page One Productions.
