= Survivor: Cambodia =

Season of television series

- Season 31
- Region 1 DVD cover
- Presented by: Jeff Probst
- No. of days: 39
- No. of castaways: 20
- Winner: Jeremy Collins
- Runners-up: Tasha Fox; Spencer Bledsoe
- Location: Koh Rong, Cambodia
- No. of episodes: 15

Release
- Original network: CBS
- Original release: September 23 – December 16, 2015

Additional information
- Filming dates: May 31 – July 8, 2015

Season chronology
- ← Previous; Worlds Apart Next → Kaôh Rōng

Survivor: Cambodia — Second Chance (commonly referred to as either Survivor: Cambodia or Survivor: Second Chance) is the 31st season of the American CBS competitive reality television series Survivor. Unlike previous seasons, which were completely cast by producers, this season featured 20 returning contestants chosen by an online public vote. The ballot, with the 32 finalists that were considered for this season, was revealed on May 6, 2015, the same day that voting began. The final cast was revealed on May 20, at the reunion of the preceding season. After the reveal occurred, the chosen cast members immediately began the trip to Koh Rong, Cambodia, where the season was filmed. The season premiered on September 23, 2015, and concluded on December 16, 2015, when Jeremy Collins was declared the Sole Survivor over Spencer Bledsoe and Latasha "Tasha" Fox in a unanimous 10–0–0 jury vote.

== Format ==
Survivor is a reality television show based on the Swedish show Expedition Robinson, created by Mark Burnett and Charlie Parsons. The series follows a number of participants isolated in a remote location, where they must provide food, fire, and shelter. One participant is removed from the series by majority vote every three days, with challenges held to give a reward (ranging from living- and food-related prizes to a car) and immunity from being voted out of the series. The last remaining player receives a prize of $1,000,000.

== Contestants ==
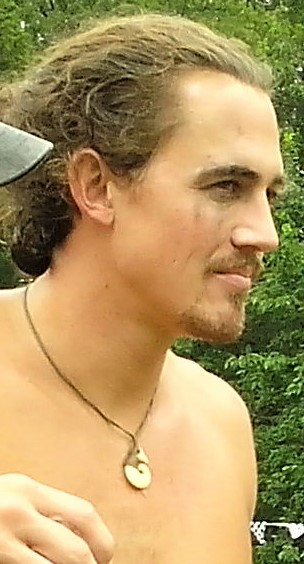
Joe Anglim

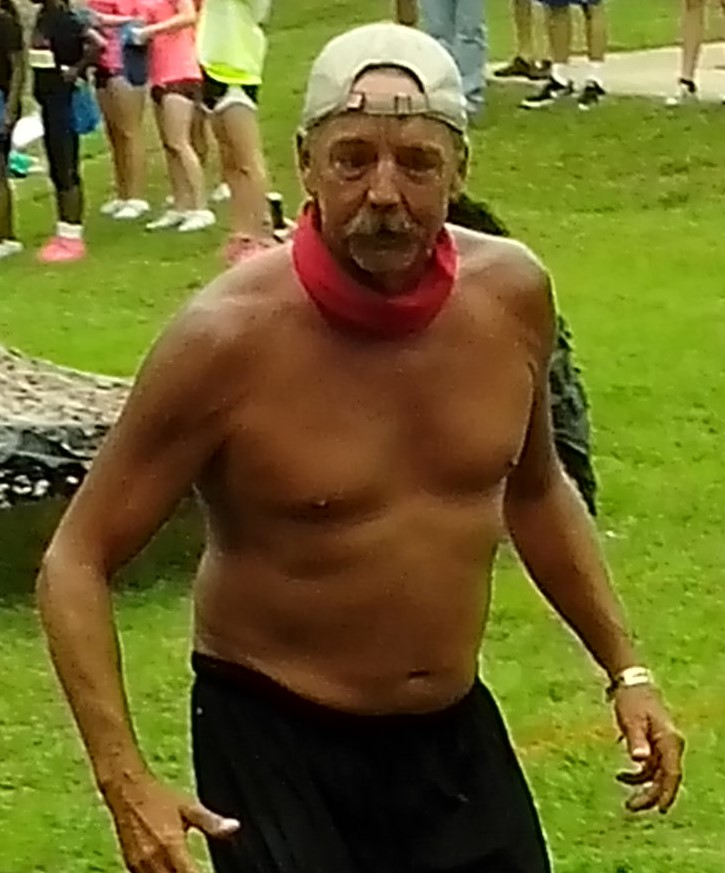
Keith Nale

The cast is composed of 20 returning players initially split into two tribes. On day 7, the tribes were shuffled from two to three. The three tribes are named after Cambodian temples: Ta Keo, Bayon, and Angkor. The merged tribe name Orkun is the Khmer word for "thank you", which was suggested by contestant Kimmi Kappenberg.

List of Survivor: Cambodia – Second Chance contestants
Contestant	Age	From	Tribe				Finish	
Contestant	Age	From	Original	First switch	Second switch	Merged	Placement	Day
Vytas Baskauskas Blood vs. Water	35	Santa Monica, California	Ta Keo				1st voted out	Day 3
Shirin Oskooi Worlds Apart	32	San Francisco, California	Ta Keo				2nd voted out	Day 6
Peih-Gee Law China	37	San Francisco, California	Ta Keo	Angkor			3rd voted out	Day 9
Jeff Varner The Australian Outback	49	Greensboro, North Carolina	Ta Keo	Angkor			4th voted out	Day 11
Monica Padilla Samoa	30	Queens, New York	Bayon	Bayon			5th voted out	Day 13
Terry Deitz Panama	55	Simsbury, Connecticut	Ta Keo	Ta Keo			Withdrew (Family emergency)	Day 13
Yung "Woo" Hwang Cagayan	31	Newport Beach, California	Ta Keo	Angkor	Ta Keo		6th voted out	Day 16
Kassandra "Kass" McQuillen Cagayan	43	Tehachapi, California	Bayon	Ta Keo	Ta Keo	Orkun	7th voted out 1st jury member	Day 19
Andrew Savage Pearl Islands	51	San Jose, California	Bayon	Angkor	Ta Keo	Orkun	8th voted out 2nd jury member	Day 21
Kelly Wiglesworth Borneo	38	Greensboro, North Carolina	Ta Keo	Bayon	Ta Keo	Orkun	9th voted out 3rd jury member	Day 24
Ciera Eastin Blood vs. Water	26	Salem, Oregon	Bayon	Ta Keo	Ta Keo	Orkun	10th voted out 4th jury member	Day 26
Stephen Fishbach Tocantins	36	New York, New York	Bayon	Bayon	Bayon	Orkun	11th voted out 5th jury member	Day 29
Joe Anglim Worlds Apart	26	Scottsdale, Arizona	Bayon	Ta Keo	Bayon	Orkun	12th voted out 6th jury member	Day 32
Abi-Maria Gomes Philippines	35	Los Angeles, California	Ta Keo	Angkor	Ta Keo	Orkun	13th voted out 7th jury member	Day 35
Kimmi Kappenberg The Australian Outback	42	The Woodlands, Texas	Bayon	Bayon	Bayon	Orkun	14th voted out 8th jury member	Day 36
Keith Nale San Juan del Sur	54	Keithville, Louisiana	Bayon	Ta Keo	Bayon	Orkun	15th voted out 9th jury member	Day 37
Kelley Wentworth San Juan del Sur	29	Seattle, Washington	Ta Keo	Ta Keo	Bayon	Orkun	16th voted out 10th jury member	Day 38
Spencer Bledsoe Cagayan	23	Chicago, Illinois	Ta Keo	Bayon	Ta Keo	Orkun	Co-runners-up	Day 39
Latasha "Tasha" Fox Cagayan	38	St. Louis, Missouri	Bayon	Angkor	Bayon	Orkun	Co-runners-up	Day 39
Jeremy Collins San Juan del Sur	37	Foxboro, Massachusetts	Bayon	Bayon	Bayon	Orkun	Sole Survivor	Day 39

=== Future appearances ===
Ciera Eastin and Jeff Varner returned for Survivor: Game Changers. Joe Anglim and Kelley Wentworth returned for Survivor: Edge of Extinction. Jeremy Collins returned to compete on Survivor: Winners at War.

Outside of Survivor, Yung "Woo" Hwang, Wentworth, Collins, and Anglim competed on the premiere of Candy Crush. Abi-Maria Gomes competed with two-time Survivor contestant Sierra Dawn Thomas on a Survivor vs Big Brother episode of Fear Factor. In 2022, Tasha Fox competed on the first season of The Challenge: USA. In 2025, Collins competed on the third season of The Traitors.

== Season summary ==
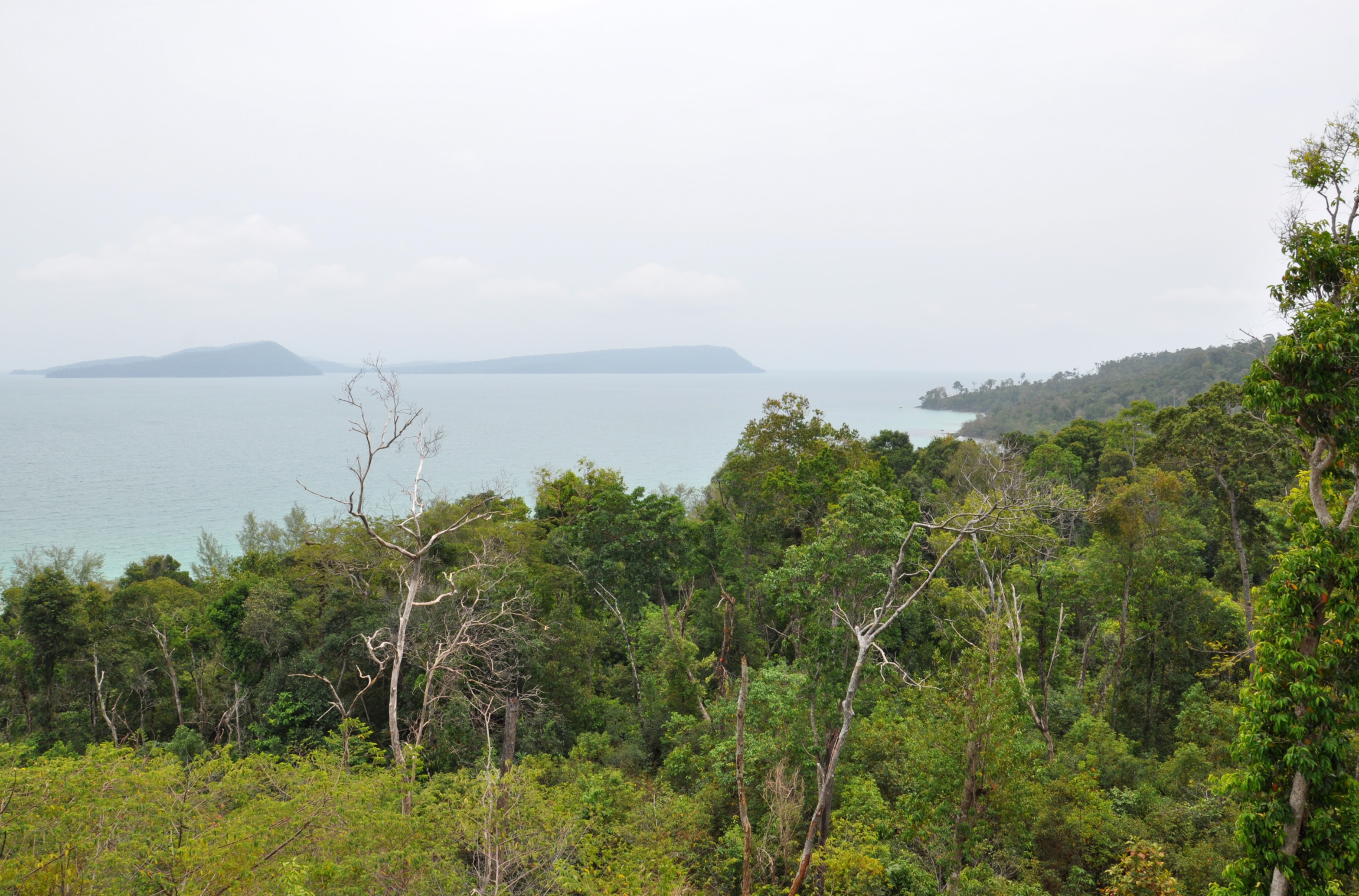
The season filmed in Koh Rong in Cambodia.

The 20 returning castaways were initially divided into two tribes of ten: Bayon and Ta Keo. Bayon was led by a core alliance spearheaded by Andrew and Jeremy, the entire tribe promising to stay loyal in the face of upcoming tribe swaps. Throughout the two tribe shuffles, the original Ta Keo tribe fractured while most original Bayon members continued acting in the interest of reforming at the merge. However, some—such as Ciera and Kass—were not as loyal, creating a new alliance on the second Ta Keo tribe. On the third Ta Keo tribe, Ciera and Kass's new alliance came into conflict with Andrew, and they blindsided his ally Woo.

The tribes merged the next day with 13 players remaining, setting Andrew and Jeremy's reformed Bayon alliance against Ciera and Kass's. Though the Bayon alliance initially held the majority, the tribe's large size and multitude of intertwining relationships as a result of the tribe swaps caused the players to eschew long-term alliances in favor of creating temporary voting blocs to get rid of common threats.

While the voting bloc strategy prevailed well into the merge, stable alliances began to form as the numbers dwindled. With seven players remaining, Jeremy formed a majority alliance with Spencer, who had had no consistent allies throughout the game, and original Bayon members Kimmi and Tasha. However, Kimmi later betrayed them to align with outsiders Keith and Kelley. Kimmi was eliminated after the ensuing deadlock tie, and Jeremy, Spencer, and Tasha reached the end of the game together. Ultimately, at the Final Tribal Council, Jeremy was rewarded for his strategic and social dominance throughout the entire game, earning the title of Sole Survivor by a unanimous jury vote.

Challenge winners and eliminations by episodes
Episode			Challenge winner(s)		Eliminated	
No.	Title	Original air date	Reward	Immunity	Tribe	Player
1	"Second Chance"	September 23, 2015	Ta Keo	Bayon	Ta Keo	Vytas
2	"Survivor MacGyver"	September 30, 2015	Bayon	Bayon	Ta Keo	Shirin
3	"We Got a Rat"	October 7, 2015	None (Note: There was no reward challenge due to the tribe switch.)	Ta Keo	Angkor	Peih-Gee
3	"We Got a Rat"	October 7, 2015	None	Bayon	Angkor	Peih-Gee
4	"What's the Beef?"	October 14, 2015	Andrew (Note: This player won the hero challenge, earning reward for their entire tribe. Jeremy ran the leg for Bayon, but came in last.) (Angkor)	Bayon	Angkor	Jeff
4	"What's the Beef?"	October 14, 2015	Terry (Ta Keo)	Ta Keo	Angkor	Jeff
5	"A Snake in the Grass"	October 21, 2015	Ta Keo	Angkor	Bayon	Monica
5	"A Snake in the Grass"	October 21, 2015	Angkor	Ta Keo	Bayon	Monica
6	"Bunking with the Devil"	October 28, 2015	Ta Keo	Bayon	Ta Keo	Terry
6	"Bunking with the Devil"	October 28, 2015	Ta Keo	Bayon	Ta Keo	Woo
7	"Play to Win"	November 4, 2015	None (Note: There was no reward challenge due to the merge.)	Joe	Orkun	Kass
8	"You Call, We'll Haul"	November 11, 2015	Ciera, Joe, Keith, Kelley, Kelly, Kimmi	Joe	Orkun	Andrew
9	"Witches Coven"	November 18, 2015	Ciera, Joe, Spencer, Stephen, Tasha	Joe	Orkun	Kelly
10	"Like Selling Your Soul to the Devil"	November 25, 2015	Abi-Maria, Ciera, Joe, Spencer, Tasha	Joe	Orkun	Ciera
11	"My Wheels Are Spinning"	November 25, 2015	Stephen [Jeremy, Tasha]	Spencer	Orkun	Stephen
12	"Tiny Little Shanks to the Heart"	December 2, 2015	Kelley [Abi-Maria, Joe, Keith, Kimmi]	Keith	Orkun	Joe
12	"Tiny Little Shanks to the Heart"	December 2, 2015	Kelley [Abi-Maria, Joe, Keith, Kimmi]	Kelley	Orkun	Joe
13	"Villains Have More Fun"	December 9, 2015	Keith [Kelley, Spencer]	Spencer	Orkun	Abi-Maria
14	"Lie, Cheat and Steal"	December 16, 2015	None	Spencer	Orkun	Kimmi
14	"Lie, Cheat and Steal"	December 16, 2015	None	Kelley	Orkun	Keith
14	"Lie, Cheat and Steal"	December 16, 2015	None	Jeremy	Orkun	Kelley
15	"Reunion"	December 16, 2015				

== Episodes ==
No. overall	No. in season	Title	CBS recap	Rating/share (18–49)	Original release date	U.S. viewers (millions)	Weekly rank
456	1	"Second Chance"	Recap	2.5/8	September 23, 2015	9.70	18
After visiting the temples of Siem Reap, the 20 returning castaways were divided into two tribes: Bayon and Ta Keo.: Reward challenge: The tribes ransacked a boat for supplies and loaded them onto a raft. They then paddled their raft to a second boat 100 yards away; the first player to reach the second boat won an extra bag of rice for their tribe.; Woo won the rice for Ta Keo. At Ta Keo, some immediately began setting up camp, while others started strategizing. Vytas, as in his original season, tried to form bonds with the women, which Shirin noticed, and began targeting him for his perceived smugness. He later irritated the other younger women while trying to teach them yoga. Abi-Maria lost her bracelet, which she later found in Peih-Gee's bag; though she told the rest of her tribe that she was wary of Peih-Gee, Peih-Gee was able to clear the air. Jeff Varner and Peih-Gee found themselves caught between the "old school" players who set up the camp's shelter—Kelly Wiglesworth, Terry, Vytas, and Woo—and the "new school" strategists—Abi-Maria, Kelley Wentworth, Shirin, and Spencer. Wentworth found a clue to a hidden immunity idol, which revealed its exact location in the structure of the upcoming immunity challenge. Upon arriving at the Bayon camp, Jeremy quickly made alliances with Andrew, Keith, Joe, and Tasha. Joe earned his tribemates' admiration, particularly Andrew's, by making fire without flint, while Stephen struggled with camp setup. He later searched for a hidden immunity idol, but was unsuccessful, and his absence from camp was noted by the rest of his tribe.: Reward/Immunity challenge: The tribes guided a lit raft through shallow water, lighting torches on their path with a fire on the raft. Upon reaching shore, the tribe set down their rafts at a gate; one tribemate crafted a pole of sticks and twine to reach through the gate to retrieve a key. The first tribe that unlocked their gate and set the final torch ablaze won immunity and a fire-making kit. The challenge was based on "Quest for Fire," the first challenge from Borneo, the first season.; Joe retrieved the key first for Bayon, and they won the challenge. While her Ta Keo tribemates were distracted, Wentworth was able to retrieve the hidden immunity idol. Ta Keo was immediately sent to Tribal Council, with no time to scramble. At Tribal Council, the old-schoolers targeted Abi-Maria for her volatility at camp, while the new-schoolers targeted Vytas. Jeff Varner and Peih-Gee aligned with the new-schoolers, and Vytas was the first player voted out.
457	2	"Survivor MacGyver"	Recap	2.4/9	September 30, 2015	9.43	14
Though he voted with the new-schoolers to eliminate Vytas, Jeff Varner conspired with the old-schoolers to target Shirin and Spencer for their cunning. Abi-Maria's abrasive social behavior alienated her from her tribe; after she overheard Peih-Gee and Shirin talking negatively about her, Abi-Maria confronted Peih-Gee, and the argument resulted in their alliance making fun of Abi-Maria. A vulnerable Abi-Maria was comforted by Terry, and the two aligned. The next morning, Abi-Maria and Jeff Varner solidified their plans to switch to the old-school alliance, putting them in power. On Bayon, Joe solidified his role as the tribe's provider, but his skills made him a target of Stephen's. Andrew tearfully recounted meeting his now-wife, which prompted Jeremy—missing his pregnant wife—to wander off. After Stephen speculated that Jeremy was looking for a hidden immunity idol, Andrew comforted Jeremy and discussed targeting Stephen for constantly thinking about the game.: Reward/Immunity challenge: The tribes raced up and down three A-frames carrying ropes, then four members used them to pull a heavy wooden crate filled with puzzle pieces across a ramp. Two tribemates then used the pieces to solve a puzzle; the first pair to complete it won immunity and camp tools for their tribe. Yank Yer Hank challenge from Samoa.; Bayon won the challenge. Back at camp, the now-strengthened old-school alliance recruited a reluctant Kelley Wentworth and Peih-Gee to split up Shirin and Spencer. Though Shirin apologized to Abi-Maria for not defending her when she was being made fun of, Abi-Maria refused to deviate from the plan. At Tribal Council, both Shirin and Spencer pleaded to their tribemates to save them; ultimately, Spencer was spared as Shirin was voted out.
458	3	"We Got a Rat"	Recap	2.0/7	October 7, 2015	9.07	17
The morning after Shirin's elimination, the tribes were redistributed from two to three. Jeremy, Kimmi, Monica, and Stephen were joined by Kelly Wiglesworth and Spencer on Bayon, while Kelley Wentworth and Terry were joined by Ciera, Joe, Kass, and Keith on Ta Keo. Abi-Maria, Andrew, Jeff Varner, Peih-Gee, Tasha, and Woo formed the new Angkor tribe, and had to build a new camp from scratch. At Angkor, the tribe struggled with building another camp amidst the harsh weather. Though Andrew and Tasha were in the minority as the only former Bayon members, they made individual deals with their new tribemates to protect them at the merge, and also noticed the tension between Abi-Maria and Peih-Gee. Ta Keo celebrated their tribe strength, but Wentworth campaigned against Terry, the only other retained Ta Keo member. At Bayon, Spencer attempted to build social relations with his new tribe, and succeeded with Jeremy. Jeremy found the clue to an idol hidden at the upcoming immunity challenge.: Immunity challenge: The tribes pushed a wagon across an obstacle course, and retrieved three keys from tall posts to unlock three trunks with puzzle pieces inside, and put the trunks on the wagon. After getting all three trunks, the tribes disassembled the wagon and pushed the wagon and trucks either through or over a fence, then climb over the fence themselves. They then re-assembled the wagon, put the trunks back on board, and dragged the wagon through more obstacles. Once at the finish, two tribe members used the pieces to assemble a vertical puzzle. The first two tribes to finish won immunity. Draggin' the Dragon challenge from Cagayan.; Jeremy snagged Bayon's idol during the challenge. Ta Keo held onto their lead to place first, with Bayon placing second. After losing the challenge, Jeff Varner attempted to send a message to Wiglesworth on Bayon, but Tasha caught him and called him out. Jeff Varner then revealed that Andrew and Tasha had made multiple deals with the former Ta Keo members. Back at Angkor, the former Ta Keo members tried to stay strong against Andrew and Tasha, who targeted Jeff Varner; however, Abi-Maria decided to align with the former Bayon members, which provoked Peih-Gee, and each of the two tried to rally support to eliminate the other. At Tribal Council, Andrew and Tasha aligned with Abi-Maria and Jeff Varner, and they sent Peih-Gee home.
459	4	"What's the Beef?"	Recap	2.2/8	October 14, 2015	9.07	13
After returning from Tribal Council, Jeff Varner proclaimed his loyalty to his tribemates, but Tasha continued to campaign against him. Abi-Maria confronted Woo for voting against her twice. At Bayon, Jeremy lied to Stephen about finding the idol.: Reward challenge: One representative per tribe raced out into the water to retrieve one of three sandbags, and then jumped on a plank like a seesaw to launch it into a net above them. The first to get all three sandbags into the net tribe won a grill, wok, sausages, and spices for their tribe, while the runner-up's tribe received a wok and vegetables. Walk on Water challenge from Samoa.; Savage won the challenge for Angkor, Terry placed second for Ta Keo, and Jeremy lost for Bayon. At Ta Keo, Kass made Kelley Wentworth a necklace as a belated birthday gift in an attempt to rehabilitate her previous, cutthroat image. On Bayon, Spencer told his new tribemates to get rid of Kelly Wiglesworth for her connections from the old Ta Keo tribe, but Monica did not trust him.: Immunity challenge: One castaway from each tribe worked as a caller to direct their blindfolded tribemates in collecting 16 large puzzle pieces from a field. Once all of the puzzle pieces were collected, the entire tribe worked together to assemble the puzzle. The first two tribes that completed their puzzle won immunity. Blind Leading the Blind challenge from All-Stars and Heroes vs. Villains.; During the puzzle solving, Jeff Varner dropped a puzzle piece on his toe. Bayon finished first, followed by Ta Keo. Abi-Maria, Andrew, and Tasha affirmed their majority alliance, but while Andrew and Tasha tried to target Jeff Varner for being both a physical liability and a threat to Abi-Maria's loyalty to them, Abi-Maria wanted to vote out Woo for having previously voted against her. At Tribal Council, both Jeff Varner and Woo pledged loyalty to the majority alliance, but they chose to eliminate Jeff Varner unanimously.
460	5	"A Snake in the Grass"	Recap	2.1/8	October 21, 2015	9.10	15
At Bayon, Monica argued with Kimmi about taking too many clams from the ocean, which led to Kimmi complaining about Monica to Stephen.: Reward challenge: Three tribemates rolled a fourth in a barrel to three flagpoles to unspool bags of balls. Once all of the bags were retrieved, one tribemate rolled the balls up a ramp and into six targets. The first tribe to have a ball in all six targets won fruit, juice, chairs, pillows, blankets, a hammock, a tarp, and candles, while the second-place tribe won a tarp. Barrel of Monkeys challenge from Blood vs. Water.; Ta Keo placed first, with Angkor in second. Back at Ta Keo, the entire tribe aligned, except for Terry. At Bayon, Jeremy and Spencer continued to bond. On Angkor, Woo earned sympathy from Andrew and Tasha after telling them about his mother's heart transplant, but Abi-Maria was annoyed by the perceived tactic.: Immunity challenge: The tribes raced up a tower and through a series of obstacles. At the top, one tribemate at a time launched sandbags from a catapult toward targets on the field below. The first two tribes to hit all five of their targets won immunity. Gone Shootin' challenge from Worlds Apart.; Angkor finished first, followed by Ta Keo. The four original Bayon members chose to target Kelly Wiglesworth over Spencer. Monica tried to recruit Kimmi for a women's alliance, targeting Spencer; Kimmi told Jeremy and Stephen about Monica's plan. Ultimately, Monica was betrayed by Jeremy, Kimmi, and Stephen for being unreliable, and she became the fifth person voted out.
461	6	"Bunking with the Devil"	Recap	2.1/7	October 28, 2015	8.48	16
Host Jeff Probst visited the Ta Keo camp to inform Terry that his son Danny had been hospitalized, and Terry was subsequently pulled from the game to be with his family. The next morning, the tribes were shuffled again: the new Bayon tribe was composed of Jeremy, Joe, Keith, Kelley Wentworth, Kimmi, Stephen, and Tasha, while Abi-Maria, Andrew, Ciera, Kass, Kelly Wiglesworth, Spencer, and Woo formed the new Ta Keo tribe. Kass and Spencer, nemeses on their original season, were reunited, and Wentworth found herself the sole original Ta Keo tribemate with six original Bayon members.: Reward challenge: Castaways went head-to-head against a member of the other tribe, sliding down a slippery narrow path to retrieve a ring. The first player to throw their ring onto a post won a point for their tribe; the first tribe to three points won a picnic with chicken, mac and cheese, and brownies. Slide Show challenge from One World.; Wiglesworth beat Wentworth in the final round to win the challenge for Ta Keo. On Ta Keo, Andrew brought together his Angkor allies Abi-Maria and Woo and original Bayon tribemates Ciera and Kass to target Spencer. Andrew told his alliance that they would tell Spencer that Ciera was the target, which alarmed her. At Bayon, Joe promised Wentworth—his ally from Ta Keo—that he would try to keep her safe, and targeted Kimmi. Stephen ratted Joe out to Jeremy and Tasha and campaigned to eliminate him, but Jeremy was reluctant to do so.: Immunity challenge: Each tribe sent an equal number of representatives in a race to eat local Cambodian delicacies. The first tribe to have all their representatives finish won a point for their tribe; first tribe to four points won immunity. Pesky Palate challenge from multiple seasons, including Borneo, The Australian Outback, Pearl Islands, and Blood vs. Water.; Tasha defeated Kass in the final round to win immunity for Bayon. Back at Ta Keo, Andrew's alliance confirmed their plan to target Spencer with Ciera as the decoy, but Ciera was frightened that Andrew's true allegiance was with Woo over his original Bayon tribe, and convinced Abi-Maria and Kass to target Woo. Kass decided—though she wanted Spencer gone—that Woo was the more pressing threat, and alerted Spencer to Andrew's plan. At Tribal Council, Abi-Maria, Ciera, and Kass teamed up with Spencer to vote Woo out. Months after Terry returned home, his son received a successful heart transplant.
462	7	"Play to Win"	Recap	2.0/7	November 4, 2015	8.80	16
The morning after Woo's elimination, Andrew believed that Kass' betrayal proved that she was no longer loyal to the original Bayon tribe. Later that morning, the tribes unexpectedly merged, forming Orkun, the largest tribe in Survivor history at 13 members. Andrew and Jeremy rekindled their original Bayon alliance with Kimmi, Stephen, and Tasha, with the addition of Kelly Wiglesworth, while Kass and Kelley Wentworth attempted to reform their alliance from the second Ta Keo tribe, securing Ciera and bringing Abi-Maria into the fold. Both alliances vied for the votes of Joe and Keith, who had been in both initial alliances, and Spencer, who had no solid allies; Joe and Spencer teamed up to determine their allegiance for the upcoming vote. To secure the majority, Kass attempted to strategize with Tasha, but Tasha lied to her about the Bayon alliance as vengeance for Kass betraying her in their original season. Kass caught on to Tasha's deception, and tried to patch things up the next morning. Tasha admitted that she did not trust Kass, and the two discussed their feud in front of the rest of the tribe. Ciera then lied to Jeremy and Joe, telling them that Andrew and Woo had discussed getting rid of them.: Immunity challenge: Castaways stood on a beam while balancing a ball on a pole, held with one hand. After 10 minutes, the remaining contestants moved their feet to a narrower section and lowered their hand down the pole. After another 10 minutes, those still in the challenge moved to the narrowest section with their hand at the bottom section of the pole. The last castaway with their ball still balanced on the pole won immunity. Hard to Handle challenge from Cagayan.; Joe outlasted Spencer to win individual immunity. Joe, Keith, and Spencer sided with the Bayon alliance and the nine decided to split the vote between Ciera and Kass in case of a hidden immunity idol. The alliance of Abi-Maria, Ciera, and Kass correctly deduced that the others were going to split the vote, and attempted to get Spencer to join them in voting against Tasha, which would send her home. At Tribal Council, Ciera and Kass' alliance crumbled, and Kass became the first member of the jury.
463	8	"You Call, We'll Haul"	Recap	2.1/7	November 11, 2015	9.00	15
Though Andrew and Jeremy celebrated Kass' elimination and planned to target the minority alliance of Abi-Maria, Ciera, and Kelley Wentworth, Stephen plotted with Ciera to betray his alliance and blindside Joe.: Reward challenge: Divided into two teams of six, the castaways paddled out into the ocean to retrieve four large puzzle cubes with colored sides. Once all four pieces were returned to the beach, the castaways had to stack the cubes such that there would be no repeating colors on each side. The first team that solved their puzzle won an afternoon at a café to enjoy coffee and desserts. Rove, Rove, Rove Your Boat challenge from Blood vs. Water.; The team of Ciera, Keith, Wentworth, Kelly Wiglesworth, Kimmi, and Joe won the challenge. On the reward trip, Ciera discussed trying to break up Andrew, Jeremy, Stephen, and Tasha, which piqued Joe's interest. Back at camp, Stephen talked to Jeremy, Spencer, and Tasha about getting rid of Joe unless he won immunity again, but Andrew overheard him, and ratted Stephen out to Joe upon the latter's return from the reward trip.: Immunity challenge: The castaways balanced a ball on a disc attached to knotted ropes, moving their hands down a knot every 10 minutes to increase difficulty. After 30 minutes, a second ball was added. Castaways were eliminated when a ball fell off their disc; the last player with all of their balls remaining won immunity. Take the Reins challenge from San Juan del Sur.; Joe outlasted Keith to win immunity again, foiling Stephen's plan. Andrew and Joe recruited Wiglesworth and the minority alliance to eliminate Stephen, but Jeremy attempted to veto their plan because of Stephen's loyalty to him throughout the pre-merge, and tried to keep the target on the minority alliance. At Tribal Council, Ciera and Wentworth implored the majority alliance to jump ship and target the alliance's core, but they held strong and all voted against Wentworth, opting not to split the vote. However, Wentworth played her hidden immunity idol, and Andrew was eliminated with the minority alliance's three votes.
464	9	"Witches Coven"	Recap	2.1/7	November 18, 2015	9.05	17
After Kelley Wentworth's successful idol play, the majority alliance scoured the camp looking for a replacement idol, while Abi-Maria, Ciera, and Wentworth—collectively referred to by all as “the Witches”—continued to look for divisions in the majority alliance.: Reward challenge: Divided into two teams of five, each team assembled a staircase out of wooden poles, then climbed it to reach a bamboo maze. Upon exiting the maze and sliding down bamboo, one tribe member maneuvered a key through a rope obstacle and then used it to unlock a machete to release puzzle pieces. Two more tribe members then solved a puzzle to reveal the solution to a combination lock. The first tribe that unlocked their flag won a day trip to a spa. Styx challenge from Cagayan.; Abi-Maria was not chosen to compete. The team of Jeremy, Keith, Wentworth, Kelly Wiglesworth, and Kimmi struggled assembling their poles, allowing Ciera, Joe, Spencer, Stephen, and Tasha to coast to an easy victory. Ciera tried to convince the others on the reward trip to make a move against Jeremy but, back at camp, Jeremy found a clue to another hidden immunity idol. The clue told Jeremy the idol's exact location outside of camp, but required him to go there that night, after the challenge winners returned from the spa; he did so, and found his second hidden idol. Stephen later noted the bond between Joe and Wiglesworth, and conspired with the Witches to vote together at the upcoming Tribal Council to split them up.: Immunity challenge: The castaways stood barefoot on wooden slats on an a-frame, floating in the water, trying to remain balanced. After 10 minutes, the castaways moved up to a second set of slats, closer together; after another 10 minutes, the castaways moved to the top of the a-frame. After another 10 minutes, the castaways had to stand on one foot until one person remained, who would then win immunity. Bermuda Triangles challenge from Caramoan and Cagayan.; During the challenge, host Jeff Probst revealed buoys in the water; the first castaway to touch their buoy would win an advantage in the game, but all who jumped off forfeited their shot at immunity. Spencer and Stephen jumped off, and Stephen edged out Spencer to win the advantage. Joe outlasted Abi-Maria to win his third consecutive immunity challenge. Stephen's advantage was that he had the right to “steal” another player's vote at any Tribal Council until the final five, prohibiting them from voting, while allowing him to vote twice. While the majority alliance decided to split their votes between Ciera and Wentworth, with the latter as the main target, Stephen tried to convince Jeremy and Spencer to join him and the Witches to vote against Wiglesworth. Though they were initially hesitant to risk alienating the rest of their alliance, they followed through with Stephen's plan at Tribal Council, and Wiglesworth became the third member of the jury.
465	10	"Like Selling Your Soul to the Devil"	Recap	1.8/6	November 25, 2015	8.12	17
Though Jeremy, Spencer, and Stephen voted against Kelly Wiglesworth, they assured the rest of their alliance that they were still with them against the Witches, chalking their decision up to the strategy of forming temporary "voting blocs" that justified different factions teaming up from vote to vote.: Reward challenge: Divided into two teams of five, three castaways from each team faced off against each other in a river to retrieve a ball and throw it into their team's net to score a point. The first team to score three points won a feast and a trip to a Cambodian circus. Basket Brawl challenge from Tocantins.; Abi-Maria, Ciera, Joe, Spencer, and Tasha won the challenge. While Ciera led the charge on the reward trip to target Stephen because of his advantage, the castaways back at camp discussed targeting Joe once his immunity streak ended. The rain continued to take its toll on the castaways, deteriorating their mental and physical health. Before the immunity challenge, host Jeff Probst gave the castaways the chance to forfeit the challenge in exchange for an enhanced shelter with a waterproof roof, courtesy of a construction crew, provided at least five players chose to forfeit. The castaways made their choice without being able to consult each other; only Joe and Keith opted to compete, giving the tribe the enhanced shelter.: Immunity challenge: The castaways balanced on a block with one foot while stabilizing a ball against a hanging piece of wood. If a castaway fell off or dropped their ball, they were eliminated; the last player remaining won immunity. Ballin' A Jack challenge from San Juan del Sur.; Joe beat Keith to win immunity again. Jeremy, Kimmi, and Stephen decided to target Ciera as the most dangerous of the Witches, but the Witches recruited Joe, Keith, Spencer, and Tasha to blindside Stephen, with two votes on Kimmi in case of Stephen's advantage. Joe, Spencer, and Tasha told Jeremy of the plan; though he tried to dissuade them, they followed through with the Witches' plan at Tribal Council. However, Jeremy played one of his idols on Stephen, negating the five votes against him, and Ciera was eliminated with Jeremy, Kimmi, and Stephen's votes. After saving Stephen, Jeremy told Spencer that he would do the same for him.
466	11	"My Wheels are Spinning"	Recap	1.8/6	November 25, 2015	8.12	17
Back at camp, Jeremy reiterated to Spencer that he would have saved him as he did Stephen, but Spencer was uncertain.: Reward challenge: Jeff told the castaways a story about Cambodian history. The castaways then ran through a maze to one of five stations, each with a question about the story. Each station had three bags of medallions wrapped in cloth that corresponded to possible answers; the correct answer had golden medallions, whereas incorrect ones had wooden medallions. The first castaway to retrieve all five gold medallions won a trip by helicopter to a resort on another island, where they would enjoy a feast. Folklore challenge from Borneo and Africa.; During the challenge, Kelley Wentworth found a hidden immunity idol clue packaged with a medallion. Stephen edged out Spencer to win, and took Jeremy and Tasha with him on the trip. Though Tasha had voted against Stephen in the previous Tribal Council, Stephen told her and Jeremy about his vote stealing advantage, and the three reaffirmed their alliance. Back at camp, Abi-Maria, Joe, Keith, Kelley, and Spencer decided to align against the reward-goers and Kimmi. Kelley's clue told her that an immunity idol was hidden underneath the newly-rebuilt shelter, and she retrieved it when everyone else was out of the camp.: Immunity challenge: Only using their feet, the castaways would unspool a rope to release a pile of blocks and then, still only with their feet, stack the blocks into three rows on a rotating circular platform. The first castaway to stack three rows and then place a flag in the center of their platform would win immunity. The Game is Afoot challenge from San Juan del Sur.; Spencer won the challenge, ending Joe's immunity streak. With Joe eligible to be voted against for the first time all game, Stephen spearheaded the effort to eliminate him, but Joe's new alliance of five—including Spencer, unbeknownst to Jeremy's alliance—decided to target Stephen again. At Tribal Council, Stephen used his advantage to steal Joe's vote, giving his bloc—him, Jeremy, Kimmi, and Tasha—five of the nine votes. However, believing Spencer to be with them, they split their votes between Abi-Maria and Joe in case of a hidden immunity idol, allowing Abi-Maria, Kelley, Keith, and Spencer to send Stephen to the jury with only four votes.
467	12	"Tiny Little Shanks to the Heart"	Recap	2.1/7	December 2, 2015	9.42	14
With four men and four women remaining, Kimmi organized a women's alliance between her, Abi-Maria, Kelley, and Tasha to eliminate Joe next and then take over the game. At the reward challenge, the castaways were visited by their loved ones: Abi-Maria's mother Vera; Jeremy's wife and San Juan del Sur castaway Val; Joe's father Pat; Keith's wife Dana; Kelley's father and San Juan del Sur castaway Dale; Kimmi's father Robert; Spencer's girlfriend Marcella; and Tasha's cousin Christina.: Reward challenge: The castaways dug up dirt to unearth a rope, then untied three bags of puzzle pieces. They then spun around a post to unlock a fourth bag, and then brought the four bags across a balance beam, untying a fifth bag on the way. They then used the puzzle pieces to solve a vertical word puzzle; the first castaway to solve the puzzle got to bring their loved one back to camp to enjoy a barbeque.; Kelley won the challenge, and chose to share her reward with Abi-Maria, Joe, Keith, Kimmi, and their loved ones. While they enjoyed the feast, the three non-chosen castaways—Jeremy, Spencer, and Tasha—made a final three deal.: Immunity challenge: The castaways held onto the bottom of a pole while balancing a wooden statue on top, while adding additional foot-long sections to the pole at regular intervals. The last man and woman remaining won immunity. Over-Extended challenge from Samoa.; Kelley won immunity for the women. Joe and Keith were the last men remaining; Joe passed out due to fatigue, though was cleared to remain in the game, and Keith won immunity. Though Joe had passed out during the challenge, the other castaways still targeted him for being a physical threat. Tasha told Jeremy and Spencer about the girls' alliance, and the two considered changing their target to Abi-Maria for her chaotic nature and to prevent the women from outnumbering the men. However, at Tribal Council, Jeremy and Spencer stuck to the original plan, and Joe was voted out.
468	13	"Villains Have More Fun"	Recap	2.3/8	December 9, 2015	9.91	9
When the final seven returned to camp, they realized that Keith was the only one who had not voted against Joe, having voted for Tasha instead, which set Tasha against Keith. Jeremy and Spencer continued to worry about a women's alliance.: Reward challenge: Each castaway unspooled a rope until they felt they had enough slack to continue on the course. They then assembled a bridge by placing wooden poles in open slots across two beams. Once across, they threw sandbags to knock down a stack of blocks. The first to knock off all their blocks won a trip to the temples of Siem Reap, where they enjoyed a feast and a traditional Cambodian ceremony. Money Box challenge from San Juan del Sur.; Keith won the challenge, as he had in San Juan del Sur, and chose to bring Kelley and Spencer with him. On the trip, the three made a final three pact, and plotted to bring in Abi-Maria to secure the majority at the next Tribal Council. Back at camp, Abi-Maria, Jeremy, Kimmi, and Tasha discussed eliminating Keith; Jeremy was hesitant to eliminate another man, but Kimmi and Tasha assured him that there was no women's alliance. Later, Jeremy and Tasha asked Abi-Maria to leave so they could talk privately; she refused, which annoyed them, and they considered targeting her instead.: Immunity challenge: The castaways raced out through an obstacle course in the water, then swam to retrieve a key; after crossing the course again to return to shore, they used the key to unlock five puzzle pieces. The first castaway that solved the puzzle won immunity. Troubled Water challenge from Vanuatu and Cook Islands.; Spencer solved the puzzle in a matter of seconds to win. Tasha became exhausted in the water and had to be rescued and treated by medical. Although she was shaken by the incident she was able to continue in the game. The reward challenge winners recruited Abi-Maria to vote against Tasha, whereas Jeremy, Kimmi, and Tasha switched their target from Keith to Abi-Maria due to the latter's volatility throughout the game. Both sides believed Spencer to be with them, but at Tribal Council, Spencer voted against Abi-Maria to send her to the jury.
469	14	"Lie, Cheat and Steal"	Recap	2.2/8	December 16, 2015	9.45	8
Though Keith and Kelley thought they were next to go after the other four eliminated Abi-Maria, Kimmi decided to jump ship, and plotted with Kelley and Keith to convince the others to split the vote so the three of them could blindside Jeremy or Spencer.: Immunity challenge: The castaways raced to assemble puzzle steps on a staircase. After correctly placing all the steps, the castaways then raced to the top to complete a sliding puzzle. The first player to solve their puzzle won immunity. Step on Up challenge from Thailand and Redemption Island.; Spencer maintained his lead to win immunity. While Kimmi secretly planned with Keith and Kelley to blindside Jeremy, Spencer and Tasha figured out her plan, though Jeremy was unconvinced. At Tribal Council, Spencer publicly revealed that he, Jeremy, and Tasha were not splitting the votes; Kelley played her hidden idol, but Jeremy countered by playing his. Both Jeremy and Kelley were targeted by the other alliance, and all votes were voided. After a brief deliberation, in which Kimmi was admonished by her former alliance, the castaways re-voted, with Spencer, Jeremy, and Kelley immune. The second ballot was tied between Kimmi and Tasha. The four others told host Jeff Probst that they were not going to change their votes, thus the tie was deadlocked. Probst explained the rules: the four non-tied castaways had to unanimously decide to eliminate Kimmi or Tasha, or else the two tied would become immune; since Keith would then be the only one of the remaining four not immune, he would be eliminated by default. Jeremy and Spencer immediately said that they would not agree to eliminate Tasha, thus the only options were for Keith and Kelley to agree with them to eliminate Kimmi, or to disagree, which would eliminate Keith. Ultimately, Keith and Kelley chose the former, and Kimmi was eliminated.: Immunity challenge: The castaways raced through obstacles to retrieve six bags of puzzle pieces. The first castaway to retrieve all six bags and solve the puzzle won immunity. Out on a Limb challenge from South Pacific.; Kelley defeated Keith to win immunity. Back at camp, Kelley made Keith a fake idol, and a paranoid Jeremy told Keith to vote against Spencer. At Tribal Council, Keith chose not to reveal the fake idol and Jeremy stayed loyal, sending Keith to the jury.: Immunity challenge: The castaways, with one hand tied behind their back, dropped a ball into a metal chute, which traveled down a spiraling metal track and exited out of one of two points. The castaway would have to catch the ball and drop it back into the chute at the top. Every few minutes, an additional ball would be added to the track until seven balls were simultaneously going around the track. A turnstile gate in the middle of the track would rotate, causing the balls to alternate exiting out of the two exits. If a ball exited the track and was not caught, the castaway was eliminated; the last one remaining won immunity. Simmotion challenge from Tocantins.; Jeremy beat Spencer to win the final challenge. Kelley campaigned against Spencer at Tribal Council, and Spencer retorted that he would convince the jury to not vote for Jeremy to win if he took Kelley to the end. Jeremy honored his alliance with Spencer, and Kelley became the final member of the jury. At the Final Tribal Council, Spencer and Jeremy were admonished for their respective actions in Kelley Wentworth and Kimmi's final Tribal Councils, while Tasha was asked to defend the perception that she did Jeremy's dirty work. When asked what their second chances were about and if they achieved that, Tasha said it was about building better relationships with her allies, Spencer said it was about maturing from Cagayan and developing interpersonal skills, while Jeremy stated that he was doing it for his family, including his unborn son, and that he struggled with keeping his wife's pregnancy a secret for the entire game.
470	15	"Reunion"	N/A	1.7/6	December 16, 2015	6.49	14
Months later, at the reunion, it was revealed that the jury unanimously voted for Jeremy to win. The castaways discussed the season with host Jeff Probst.

== Voting history ==
	Original tribes		First switch				Second switch	Merged tribe												
Episode	1	2	3	4	5	6		7	8	9	10	11		12	13	14				
Day	3	6	9	11	13		16	19	21	24	26	29		32	35	36			37	38
Tribe	Ta Keo	Ta Keo	Angkor	Angkor	Bayon	Ta Keo	Ta Keo	Orkun	Orkun	Orkun	Orkun	Orkun		Orkun	Orkun	Orkun			Orkun	Orkun
Eliminated	Vytas	Shirin	Peih-Gee	Jeff	Monica	Terry	Woo	Kass	Andrew	Kelly	Ciera	Stephen		Joe	Abi-Maria	None (Note: Jeremy and Kelley played hidden immunity idols; therefore, three votes against each did not count. As there were no counted ballots, all the castaways then re-voted between those who weren't immune.)	Tie (Note: The vote resulted in a tie. The non-tied castaways were invited to re-vote between the tied castaways, but they elected to stand by their initial vote, thus forcing a deadlocked tie.)	Kimmi	Keith	Kelley
Votes	6–4	5–4	4–2	4–1	3–2–1	Withdrew (Note: No vote; Terry voluntarily left the game due to a family emergency.)	4–3	6–4–2–1	3–0 (Note: Kelley played a hidden immunity idol, therefore nine votes against her were not counted.)	6–3–2	3–2–0 (Note: Jeremy played a hidden immunity idol on Stephen, therefore five votes against him were not counted.)	4–3–2		6–1–1	4–2–1	0–0	3–3	Consensus (Note: Due to a deadlocked tie, the non-tied castaways had to come to a consensus decision to vote out either Kimmi or Tasha, or else Keith, the only non-immune deliberating castaway, would be eliminated by default (per rock-draw rules). The non-tied castaways decided to eliminate Kimmi.)	3–2	3–1
Voter	Vote																			
Jeremy					Monica			Ciera	~~Kelley~~	Kelly	Ciera	Joe		Joe	Abi-Maria	~~Kelley~~	Kimmi	Kimmi	Keith	Kelley
Spencer	Vytas	Shirin			Kelly		Woo	Ciera	~~Kelley~~	Kelly	~~Stephen~~	Stephen		Joe	Abi-Maria	~~Kelley~~	Kimmi	Kimmi	Keith	Kelley
Tasha			Peih-Gee	Jeff				Kass	~~Kelley~~	Ciera	~~Stephen~~	Abi-Maria		Joe	Abi-Maria	~~Kelley~~	Kimmi	None (Note: This player was not eligible to vote in this round of voting.)	Keith	Kelley
Kelley	Vytas	Spencer						Kass	Andrew	Kelly	Kimmi	Stephen		Joe	Tasha	~~Jeremy~~	Tasha	Kimmi	Spencer	Spencer
Keith								Kass	~~Kelley~~	Kelley	~~Stephen~~	Stephen		Tasha	Tasha	~~Jeremy~~	Tasha	Kimmi	Spencer	
Kimmi					Monica			Kass	~~Kelley~~	Ciera	Ciera	Abi-Maria		Joe	Abi-Maria	~~Jeremy~~	Tasha	None		
Abi-Maria	Vytas	Spencer	Peih-Gee	Jeff			Woo	Tasha	Andrew	Kelly	~~Stephen~~	Stephen		Joe	Keith					
Joe								Ciera	~~Kelley~~	Kelley	~~Stephen~~	None (Note: This player lost their vote as another player used a vote stealer advantage.)		Abi-Maria						
Stephen					Monica			Kass	~~Kelley~~	Kelly	Ciera	Abi-Maria	Joe (Note: This player used a vote stealer advantage, allowing them to steal one vote from another player and cast two ballots.)							
Ciera							Woo	Andrew	Andrew	Kelly	Kimmi									
Kelly	Abi-Maria	Shirin			Spencer		Spencer	Ciera	~~Kelley~~	Ciera										
Andrew			Peih-Gee	Jeff			Spencer	Kass	~~Kelley~~											
Kass							Woo	Tasha												
Woo	Abi-Maria	Shirin	Abi-Maria	Jeff			Spencer													
Terry	Abi-Maria	Spencer				Withdrew														
Monica					Kelly															
Jeff	Vytas	Shirin	Peih-Gee	Woo																
Peih-Gee	Vytas	Shirin	Abi-Maria																	
Shirin	Vytas	Spencer																		
Vytas	Abi-Maria																			

Jury vote
Episode	15		
Day	39		
Finalist	Jeremy	Spencer	Tasha
Votes	10–0–0		
Juror	Vote		
Kelley	Yes		
Keith	Yes		
Kimmi	Yes		
Abi-Maria	Yes		
Joe	Yes		
Stephen	Yes		
Ciera	Yes		
Kelly	Yes		
Andrew	Yes		
Kass	Yes		

== Production ==
=== Filming ===
It is the tenth season to feature returning players, and the third to feature a cast consisting entirely of returning players, after Survivor: All-Stars and Survivor: Heroes vs. Villains. Though this season was the 31st to air, it was the 32nd filmed and the next season after Survivor: Kaôh Rōng; the two seasons were filmed back-to-back in the same location.

This season featured several new alterations to the game format. Hidden immunity idols, typically hidden either at tribal camps or Exile Island, were hidden this season at immunity challenges before the merge. Additionally, this season marked the first time the number of regular tribes increased over the course of a season (in this case, from two to three), and the first time the tribes merged with 13 players remaining. It also introduced the vote stealer, in which one player could prohibit another from voting and cast a second ballot in their stead.

=== Casting ===
According to host and executive producer Jeff Probst, 75 former contestants were initially considered regarding on returning for this season. On Twitter and in an interview with Entertainment Weekly, Probst revealed that Greg Buis from Survivor: Borneo, Ian Rosenberger from Survivor: Palau, Shannon "Shambo" Waters from Survivor: Samoa, Roberta "R.C." Saint-Amour and Jeff Kent from Survivor: Philippines were contacted to return but all of them declined the offers. Josh Canfield, Reed Kelly, and Jon Misch from Survivor: San Juan del Sur were all contacted, however Canfield and Kelly's Broadway contracts prevented them from being able to play, and Misch missed the call.

=== Public vote ===
The vote was conducted on the CBS website, and was open to residents of the U.S. On the website, each candidate was featured in a video displaying a series of clips from their original season followed by a plea to voters as to why they should be selected for Cambodia. Registered voters were required to submit ballots of exactly ten men and ten women, and each voter could only submit a ballot once every 24 hours.

Voting commenced on May 6, 2015, while the Worlds Apart season of Survivor was still in progress. The ballot consisted entirely of players who had played only once before and had not won; however, two of the candidates from Worlds Apart (Mike Holloway and Carolyn Rivera) had not yet been eliminated from that season when voting began; if either of them were revealed to be that season's winner, they would be deemed ineligible for Cambodia and, if they were among the top ten vote receivers of their gender, their spot would be given to the person on their ballot with the 11th highest vote total. Holloway won Worlds Apart and per Jeff Probst's announcement had finished in the top 10 among male candidates, so the 11th place male candidate joined the cast instead. Probst has since stated that, out of respect for the contestants, there is no intention to reveal the final vote counts or ranks.

List of non-selected Survivor: Cambodia – Second Chance candidates
Name	Age	Hometown	Original season
Teresa "T-Bird" Cooper	56	Jackson, Georgia	Africa
Shane Powers	44	Los Angeles, California	Panama
Natalie Tenerelli	24	Studio City, California	Redemption Island
Stephanie Valencia	30	San Diego, California	Redemption Island
Jim Rice	39	Denver, Colorado	South Pacific
Mikayla Wingle	25	Miami, Florida	South Pacific
Troy "Troyzan" Robertson	53	Miami, Florida	One World
Sabrina Thompson	37	Brooklyn, New York	One World
Brad Culpepper	46	Tampa, Florida	Blood vs. Water
Max Dawson	38	Topanga, California	Worlds Apart
~~Mike Holloway~~ (Note: During the voting process, Holloway had not yet been announced as the winner of Worlds Apart; due to his victory, he was invalidated from Cambodia.)	~~38~~	~~Fort Worth, Texas~~	Worlds Apart
Carolyn Rivera	53	Queens, New York	Worlds Apart

== Reception ==
=== Ratings ===
The premiere episode was watched by 9.70 million viewers and received a 2.5/8 rating/share in the critical 18–49 demographic. Though the ratings were down from the San Juan del Sur premiere the year before, it ranked first in its timeslot and third for the night, behind Empire and Modern Family. Including three-day DVR figures, the premiere was watched by a total of 11.4 million viewers and scored a 3.1 18–49 rating. The first and second episodes were consistent with the average ratings of the last seven seasons of the show (from One World to Worlds Apart), which averaged 11.5 million viewers and 18–49 ratings between 3.1 and 3.5.

==== U.S. Nielsen ratings ====
===== Live + SD ratings =====
No. in series	No. in season	Episode	Air date	Time slot (EST)	Rating/share (18–49)	Viewers (Note: Viewers in millions.)	Rank (timeslot) (Note: 18–49 ranking.)	Rank (night)	Rank (week)	Ref
454	1	"Second Chance"	September 23, 2015	Wednesdays; 8:00 p.m.	2.5/8	9.70	1	3	18	
455	2	"Survivor MacGyver"	September 30, 2015	Wednesdays; 8:00 p.m.	2.4/9	9.43	1	3	14	
456	3	"We Got a Rat"	October 7, 2015	Wednesdays; 8:00 p.m.	2.0/7	9.07	1	4	17	
457	4	"What's the Beef?"	October 14, 2015	Wednesdays; 8:00 p.m.	2.2/8	9.07	1	3	13	
458	5	"A Snake in the Grass"	October 21, 2015	Wednesdays; 8:00 p.m.	2.1/8	9.10	1	3	15	
459	6	"Bunking With the Devil"	October 28, 2015	Wednesdays; 8:00 p.m.	2.1/7	8.48	2	2	16	
460	7	"Play to Win"	November 4, 2015	Wednesdays; 8:00 p.m.	2.0/7	8.80	2	3	16	
461	8	"You Call, We'll Haul"	November 11, 2015	Wednesdays; 8:00 p.m.	2.1/7	9.00	2	4	15	
462	9	"Witches Coven"	November 18, 2015	Wednesdays; 8:00 p.m.	2.1/7	9.05	1	4	17	
463	10	"Like Selling Your Soul to the Devil"	November 25, 2015	Wednesdays; 8:00 p.m.	1.8/6	8.12	1	2	17	
464	11	"My Wheels are Spinning"	November 25, 2015	Wednesdays; 8:00 p.m.	1.8/6	8.12	1	2	17	
465	12	"Tiny Little Shanks to the Heart"	December 2, 2015	Wednesdays; 8:00 p.m.	2.1/7	9.42	1	3	14	
466	13	"Villains Have More Fun"	December 9, 2015	Wednesdays; 8:00 p.m.	2.3/8	9.91	1	2	9	
467	14	"Lie, Cheat and Steal"	December 16, 2015	Wednesdays; 8:00 p.m.	2.2/8	9.45	1	1	8	
468	15	"Reunion"	December 16, 2015	Wednesday; 10:00 p.m.	1.7/6	6.49	1	1	14	

===== DVR ratings =====
No. in season	Episode	18–49 increase	Total 18–49	Ref
1	"Second Chance"	0.6 (Note: Live + 3 ratings.)	3.1	
2	"Survivor MacGyver"	0.6	3.0	
3	"We Got a Rat"	1.0 (Note: Live + 7 ratings.)	3.0	
4	"What's the Beef?"	0.8	3.0	
5	"A Snake in the Grass"	0.9	3.0	
6	"Bunking With the Devil"	0.8	2.9	
7	"Play to Win"	0.8	2.8	
8	"You Call, We'll Haul"	—N/a	—N/a	—N/a
9	"Witches Coven"	—N/a	—N/a	—N/a
10	"Like Selling Your Soul to the Devil"	0.6	2.4	
11	"My Wheels are Spinning"	0.6	2.4	

==== Canadian ratings ====
No. in season	Episode	Air date	Time slot (EST)	Viewers (millions)	Rank (week)	Ref
1	"Second Chance"	September 23, 2015	Wednesdays; 8:00 p.m.	2.10	9	
2	"Survivor MacGyver"	September 30, 2015	Wednesdays; 8:00 p.m.	2.20	5	
3	"We Got a Rat"	October 7, 2015	Wednesdays; 8:00 p.m.	2.14	6	
4	"What's the Beef?"	October 14, 2015	Wednesdays; 8:00 p.m.	2.17	6	
5	"A Snake in the Grass"	October 21, 2015	Wednesdays; 8:00 p.m.	2.30	4	
6	"Burning With the Devil"	October 28, 2015	Wednesdays; 8:00 p.m.	2.29	3	
7	"Play to Win"	November 4, 2015	Wednesdays; 8:00 p.m.	2.43	3	
8	"You Call, We'll Hall"	November 11, 2015	Wednesdays; 8:00 p.m.	2.22	4	
9	"Witches Coven"	November 18, 2015	Wednesdays; 8:00 p.m.	2.12	6	
10	"Like Selling Your Soul to the Devil"	November 25, 2015	Wednesdays; 8:00 p.m.	2.15	5	
11	"My Wheel Are Spinning"	November 25, 2015	Wednesdays; 8:00 p.m.	2.15	5	
12	"Tiny Little Shanks to the Heart"	December 2, 2015	Wednesdays; 8:00 p.m.	2.06	1	
13	"Villains Have More Fun"	December 9, 2015	Wednesdays; 8:00 p.m.	2.16	2	
14	"Lie, Cheat and Steal"	December 16, 2015	Wednesdays; 8:00 p.m.	2.26	3	
15	"Reunion"	December 16, 2015	Wednesday; 10.00 p.m.	1.88	5	

=== Critical reception ===
The season received extremely positive reviews. Daniel Fienberg of The Hollywood Reporter reviewed the season positively, saying "The episodes this fall were a reminder of why this show works so well and why you can never rule out Survivor to produce twists and turns that rival what you might find on a Netflix or HBO drama." Dan Heaton of Rob Has a Website gave the finale—and the season—a favorable review, saying,

"This week's very satisfying finale included one of the show's greatest Tribal Councils and barely took a breath in the rush to the finish. Three different players won immunity, tears were shed, and no one backed down. There were no horrible gaffes at the Final Tribal Council, and the jury mostly avoided the bitter route. Kimmi emerged from a quiet edit to nearly dethrone the champ while Keith remained his unique self. Spencer and Tasha made a strategic error by sticking with Jeremy, but both showed real determination throughout the season to make the end. To put it mildly, I enjoyed this season."

Dalton Ross of Entertainment Weekly ranked Cambodia as his sixth-favorite season, only behind Borneo, Micronesia, Heroes vs. Villains, Cagayan, and David vs. Goliath. He stated that despite some confusion with the season's constantly-shifting "voting blocs" and his disappointment with some of the challenges, he found the season appealing due to "how hard the bulk of the cast was playing," while also praising the numerous twists such as the fan-vote, the idols hidden in challenges, the tribe swaps, and the vote-stealing advantage. Caroline Framke of Vox raved the season, saying "The high level of game play in Survivor: Second Chance made a 15-year-old formula feel new again." In 2020, "Purple Rock Podcast" ranked this season 4th out of 40 saying that "the cast is an obvious strength. The gameplay is great as well, with ever-shifting strategies as players jostle for position to make the most of their second shot at the game." Later that same year, Inside Survivor ranked this season 16th out of 40 saying that "what really makes a season is the cast. And best believe this cast plays hard. Voting blocs, alliances, immunity idols, and vote steals, no obstacle is too great for these players who have everything to prove to their fans and themselves." In 2021, Rob Has a Podcast ranked Cambodia 9th during their Survivor All-Time Top 40 Rankings podcast. In 2024, Nick Caruso of TVLine ranked this season 6th out of 47.

== Controversy ==
On December 15, the day before the live reunion show, one of the season's castaways, Vytas Baskauskas, announced on Twitter that he had been banned from participating in the reunion simply for leaving Cambodia early following his elimination. Baskauskas was the first person voted out of the game, but rather than remain sequestered from the public for the duration of filming, per the show's protocol, he chose to return to the United States early to be with his infant son. According to Inquisitr, when fans of Survivor read about his ban, many of them were irate that he was being excluded from the reunion show. However, one fan in particular claimed that Baskauskas had committed breach of contract with CBS, by making a post on Instagram during the time period in which the season was filming, thus revealing that he was indeed out of the game at the time and, therefore, potentially spoiling part of the outcome of the season.

Baskauskas defended himself by stating that the social media post in question wasn't a spoiler, since an assistant of his, with access to his Instagram account, was the one who had made that post on his behalf. Baskauskas further claimed that he couldn't have been on social media during that time, since he hadn't even gotten his phone back yet. He also pointed out that there is nothing in the Survivor contract that says that a player's social media account cannot be run by a third party.

Nonetheless, the reunion show went on without Baskauskas, nor was there any on-air acknowledgement of his absence.
