= Bulan, Iran =

Bulan or Bolan or Boolan or Bowlan (Persian: بولان) may refer to:

- Bulan, Kermanshah
- Bulan, Tehran
