= Bolon (flooring company) =

Swedish flooring company

- Industry: textile
- Founded: Stockholm, 1949
- Founder: Nils-Erik Eklund
- Headquarters: Ulricehamn, Sweden
- Website: www.bolon.com

Bolon is a Swedish design company based in Ulricehamn, Sweden. Bolon is known for inventing the woven vinyl flooring. The company was founded by Nils-Erik Eklund back in 1949.

== History ==
Bolon was founded by Nils-Erik Eklund in Stockholm 1949. Eklund began to use textile waste to manufacture woven rag rugs from a nearby factory. Later on in the 1960s Nils-Erik's son Lars and his wife Monica took over and continued developing the concept of the rag rug and also began to awn mats for caravans.

In 2003 the third generation of the family, the sisters Marie and Annica Eklund, took over the enterprise. With the sisters running the company Bolon repositioned themselves as a global design brand with projects all over the world including Australia, China, Japan, Italy, the UK and the US . Its clients include brands such as Google, Mercedes and Armani. During the last couple of years Bolon have collaborated with several designers and architects such as Missoni and Jean Nouvel

== Recognition ==
In 2011 Bolon won the Elle Decoration International Design Awards for their Botanic collection. Marie and Annica Eklund were awarded with "Näringslivsmedaljen" from The Royal Patriotic Society, Kungliga Patriotiska Sällskapet in 2015.

== Naming ==
The company's name is a combination of the first and last letters of the Swedish words for cotton (bomull) and nylon.
