= Hilary R. Bollan =

Retired senior scientific officer

Hilary R. Bollan FRSC MBE CSi CChem
- Born: Hilary Roberta Bell; Bridgwater, Somerset, England
- Education: Sheffield Hallam University (PhD)
- Scientific career
- Fields: Chemistry
- Workplaces: UK Ministry of Defence
- Thesis: The detection of hydrazine and related materials by ion mobility spectrometry (1998)

Hilary Roberta Bollan FRSC MBE CSi CChem (née Bell) is a retired chemist who was a senior scientific officer at the British Ministry of Defence. Her work focused on safety on submarines.

== Early life and education ==
Bollan was born in Bridgwater, Somerset. She obtained her PhD from Sheffield Hallam University under the direction of Michael Cooke. For her thesis project, she investigated real-time monitoring method of ammonia, hydrazines, and nitrogen dioxide below exposure limit, using ion mobility spectrometry with ketones as dopant. Her thesis research was conducted primarily at the Bridgwater Laboratories of the Defence and Evaluation Research Agency, and partly in the laboratory of Gary A. Eiceman at the New Mexico State University.

== Career and research ==
Bollan's research focused on improving the safety of submarines, from sampling and monitoring air quality to monitoring the chemicals which precede electrical fires.

Bollan served as an editor of the International Journal for Ion Mobility Spectrometry. She was the president of the International Society for Ion Mobility Spectrometry (2007–2008, 2013–2015). She organized the Annual Conference of the International Society for Ion Mobility Spectrometry in 1999 (Buxton, England) and in 2011 (Edinburgh, Scotland).

== Honours ==
Bollan is a Chartered Scientist, Chartered Chemist, and a Fellow of the Royal Society of Chemistry. She was appointed MBE (Member of the Most Excellent Order of the British Empire) for her "services to submarine safety and the Royal Navy" in the 2017 New Year Honours.
