= Bolon of Macedon =

Historical Macedonian figure

Bolon was a Macedonian soldier, who accused Philotas. He gave a speech at Phrada in 330 BC saying : Philotas had ridiculed men from the country, he continued, calling them Phrygians and Paphlagonians - this from a man who, Macedonian born, was not ashamed to use an interpreter to listen to men who spoke his own language. He is, however, mentioned only by Curtius, who may have invented the individual and the sentiments expressed for dramatic effect.
