= SS Lina Fisser =

Cargo ship

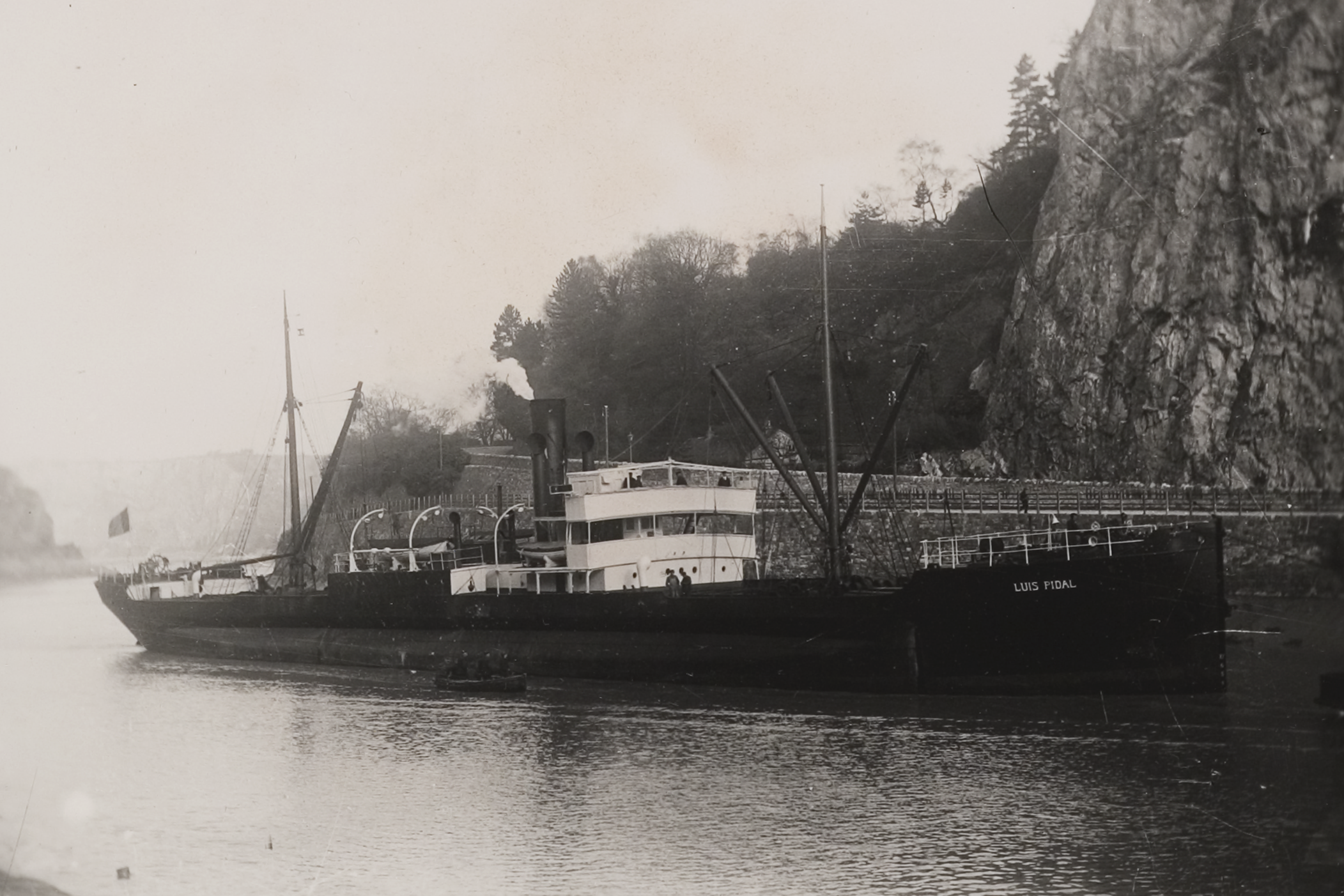
- As Luis Pidal on the River Avon

History
- Name: 1912: Thyra Menier; 1918: Luis Pidal; 1925: Bellini; 1928: Bollan; 1936: Lina Fisser; 1945: Empire Conderton; 1947: Marchmont; 1952: Irene M
- Owner: 1912: Donald Steamship Co Ltd; 1918: F Lecoeuvre; 1925: Puglisi & Tomasini; 1928: August Bolten; 1936: Reunert & Co GmbH; 1945: Ministry of War Transport; 1945: Ministry of Transport; 1947: J P Hadoulis Ltd; 1952: A Moschakis Ltd; 1952: Tampa Shipping Ltd; 1957: Marine Industries Ltd
- Operator: 1936: Fisser & Van Doornum; 1945: Alliance Marine Transport Co Ltd
- Port of registry: 1912: (United Kingdom) Bristol; 1918: (Belgium) Antwerp; 1925: (Italy) Catania; 1928: (Weimar Republic) Hamburg; 1936: (Nazi Germany) Emden; 1945: (United Kingdom) London; 1955: (Canada) Halifax; 1957: (Canada) Montreal
- Builder: Blyth Shipbuilding and Drydock Co Ltd
- Launched: 13 August 1912
- Completed: September 1912
- Identification: UK official number 127100 (1912–18, 1945–55); Code letters HWRG (1912–18); Code letters MLPX (by 1923); Code letters RHCT (1928–34); Call sign DHCR (by 1934); Call sign GMWD (1945-55)
- Fate: Scrapped in Sorel, 1957

General characteristics
- Type: cargo steamship
- Tonnage: 1,497 GRT (1912-45); 1,558 GRT (1945-57); 838 NRT (1912-45); 847 NRT (1945-57)
- Length: 240.0 ft (73.2 m)
- Beam: 36.1 ft (11.0 m)
- Draught: 16 ft 1 in (4.90 m)
- Depth: 20.1 ft (6.1 m)
- Decks: 1
- Installed power: 1 × Triple expansion engine, 146 NHP
- Propulsion: 1 × screw

Lina Fisser was a 1,497 GRT cargo ship that was built in 1912 by Blyth Shipbuilding and Drydock Co Ltd, Blyth as Thyra Menier for British owners. In 1918, it was sold to Belgian owners and renamed Luis Pidal. In 1925, it was sold to Italian owners and renamed Bellini. A further sale in 1928 to German owners saw it renamed Bollan and then Lina Fisser in 1936.

It was seized by the Allies in May 1945 at Kiel, Germany and passed to the Ministry of War Transport (MoWT) and renamed Empire Conderton. In 1947, it was sold into merchant service and was renamed Marchmont. In 1952, a further sale saw her renamed Irene M. In 1955, it was sold to Canada, serving until 1957 when it was scrapped.

== Description ==
The ship was built in 1912 by Blyth Shipbuilding and Drydock Co Ltd, Blyth. She was completed in September 1912.

The ship was 240.0 ft (73.15 m) long, with a beam of 36.1 feet (11.00 m) a depth of 20.1 feet (6.1 m). Her draught was about 16 feet 1 inch (4.90 m) Her tonnages were 1,497 GRT and 838 NRT.

GT Grey of South Shields built her engine. It was a three-cylinder Triple expansion engine, rated at 146 NHP.

== History ==
Thyra Menier was completed for the Donald Steamship Company, Bristol. Her United Kingdom official number was 127100. In 1915, she was under charter to Henri Menier and had been sub-chartered to the Canadian-American Steamship Corporation, New York. The Admiralty requisitioned her, but her charterers objects, claiming that the requisition could not take place as the ship was not in British waters. At the time, the ship was in dry dock in New York.

In 1918, Thyra Menier was sold to F Lecoeuvre, Belgium and renamed Luis Pidal. She served until 1925 when she was sold to Puglisi & Tomasini, Italy and was renamed Bellini. In 1928, she was sold to August Bolten, Germany and was renamed Bollan. She was registered in Hamburg and her code letters were RHCT. On 1 February 1930, Bollan left Swansea, Wales for Sables. Whilst awaiting the tide, an explosion in her No. 1 hold blew off the hatch covers. By 1934, her call sign was DHCR. In 1936, Bollan was sold to Reunert & Co GmbH. She was placed under the management of Fisser & Van Doornum, Emden and was renamed Lina Fisser.

In 1940, Germany claimed that British aircraft had attempted to bomb Lina Fisser in the North Sea. Lina Fisser was seized by the Allies in May 1945 at Kiel, passed to the MoWT and renamed Empire Conderton. She was registered in London, she regained her official number 127100, and her call sign was GMWD. She was placed under the management of the Alliance Marine Transport Co Ltd. Her tonnages were revised to 1,558 GRT and 847 NRT. In 1947, she was sold to J P Hadoulis Ltd, London and renamed Marchmont. In 1952, she was sold to A Moschakis, London and renamed Irene M. She was sold in 1955 to Tampa Shipping Ltd, Nova Scotia. Irene M was sold in 1957 to Marine Industries Ltd, Montreal. She was scrapped later that year at Sorel, Quebec.
