= Survivor: Samoa =

19th season of the American reality television series Survivor

- Season 19
- Region 1 DVD cover
- Presented by: Jeff Probst
- No. of days: 39
- No. of castaways: 20
- Winner: Natalie White
- Runner-up: Russell Hantz
- Location: Upolu, Samoa
- Sprint Player of the Season: Russell Hantz
- No. of episodes: 16

Release
- Original network: CBS
- Original release: September 17 – December 20, 2009

Additional information
- Filming dates: June 11 – July 19, 2009

Season chronology
- ← Previous; Tocantins – The Brazilian Highlands Next → Heroes vs. Villains

Survivor: Samoa is the nineteenth season of the American CBS competitive reality television series Survivor. The season premiered on Thursday, September 17, 2009.

In the end, Natalie White defeated Russell Hantz and Mick Trimming in a 7–2–0 jury vote. Hantz won the "Sprint Player of the Season" Award, earning the fans' vote over the next highest vote getters, Shannon "Shambo" Waters and Brett Clouser. This was the first season when the tribes merged at 12 players, and the second season (after Survivor: Fiji) with nine people on the jury.

== Format ==
Survivor is a reality television show based on the Swedish show Expedition Robinson, created by Mark Burnett and Charlie Parsons. The series follows a number of participants isolated in a remote location, where they must provide food, fire, and shelter. One participant is removed from the series by majority vote every three days, with challenges held to give a reward (ranging from living- and food-related prizes to a car) and immunity from being voted out of the series. The last remaining player receives a prize of $1,000,000.

== Contestants ==
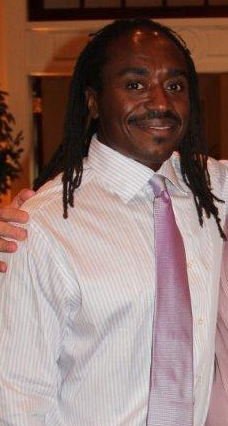
Russell Swan

The 20 contestants were initially split into two teams of ten: Foa Foa and Galu, meaning "trumpet shell" and "wave" in Samoan respectively. The merged tribe, formed on day 19, was named Aiga, which means "family" in Samoan and was first suggested by contestant Brett Clouser. Mike Borassi was originally cast for the previous season Survivor: Tocantins, but had to pull out due to high blood pressure.

List of Survivor: Samoa contestants
| Contestant | Age | From | Tribe | | Finish | |
| Contestant | Age | From | Original | Merged | Placement | Day |
|---|---|---|---|---|---|---|
| Marisa Calihan | 26 | Cincinnati, Ohio | Foa Foa | | 1st voted out | Day 3 |
| Mike Borassi | 62 | Marina del Rey, California | Foa Foa | | Medically evacuated | Day 5 |
| Betsy Bolan | 48 | Campton, New Hampshire | Foa Foa | | 2nd voted out | Day 6 |
| Ben Browning | 28 | Los Angeles, California | Foa Foa | | 3rd voted out | Day 8 |
| Yasmin Giles | 33 | Los Angeles, California | Galu | | 4th voted out | Day 11 |
| Ashley Trainer | 22 | Maple Grove, Minnesota | Foa Foa | | 5th voted out | Day 14 |
| Russell Swan | 42 | Glenside, Pennsylvania | Galu | | Medically evacuated | Day 15 |
| Elizabeth "Liz" Kim | 33 | New York City, New York | Foa Foa | | 6th voted out | Day 18 |
| Erik Cardona | 28 | Los Angeles, California | Galu | Aiga | 7th voted out 1st jury member | Day 21 |
| Kelly Sharbaugh | 25 | San Diego, California | Galu | Aiga | 8th voted out 2nd jury member | Day 24 |
| Laura Morett | 39 | Salem, Oregon | Galu | Aiga | 9th voted out 3rd jury member | Day 27 |
| John Fincher | 25 | Santa Monica, California | Galu | Aiga | 10th voted out 4th jury member | Day 30 |
| Dave Ball | 38 | Los Angeles, California | Galu | Aiga | 11th voted out 5th jury member | Day 31 |
| Monica Padilla | 25 | San Diego, California | Galu | Aiga | 12th voted out 6th jury member | Day 33 |
| Shannon "Shambo" Waters | 45 | Renton, Washington | Galu | Aiga | 13th voted out 7th jury member | Day 36 |
| Jaison Robinson | 28 | Chicago, Illinois | Foa Foa | Aiga | 14th voted out 8th jury member | Day 37 |
| Brett Clouser | 23 | Los Angeles, California | Galu | Aiga | 15th voted out 9th jury member | Day 38 |
| Mick Trimming | 33 | Los Angeles, California | Foa Foa | Aiga | 2nd runner-up | Day 39 |
| Russell Hantz | 36 | Dayton, Texas | Foa Foa | Aiga | Runner-up | Day 39 |
| Natalie White | 26 | Van Buren, Arkansas | Foa Foa | Aiga | Sole Survivor | Day 39 |

=== Future appearances ===
Russell Hantz later competed on Survivor: Heroes vs. Villains, Survivor: Redemption Island, and Australian Survivor: Champions vs. Contenders. Russell Swan competed on Survivor: Philippines. Laura Morett competed on Survivor: Blood vs. Water alongside her daughter Ciera Eastin. Monica Padilla returned for Survivor: Cambodia. John Fincher later married Survivor: Micronesia winner Parvati Shallow and appeared on Survivor: Winners at War as part of the loved ones visit.

== Season summary ==
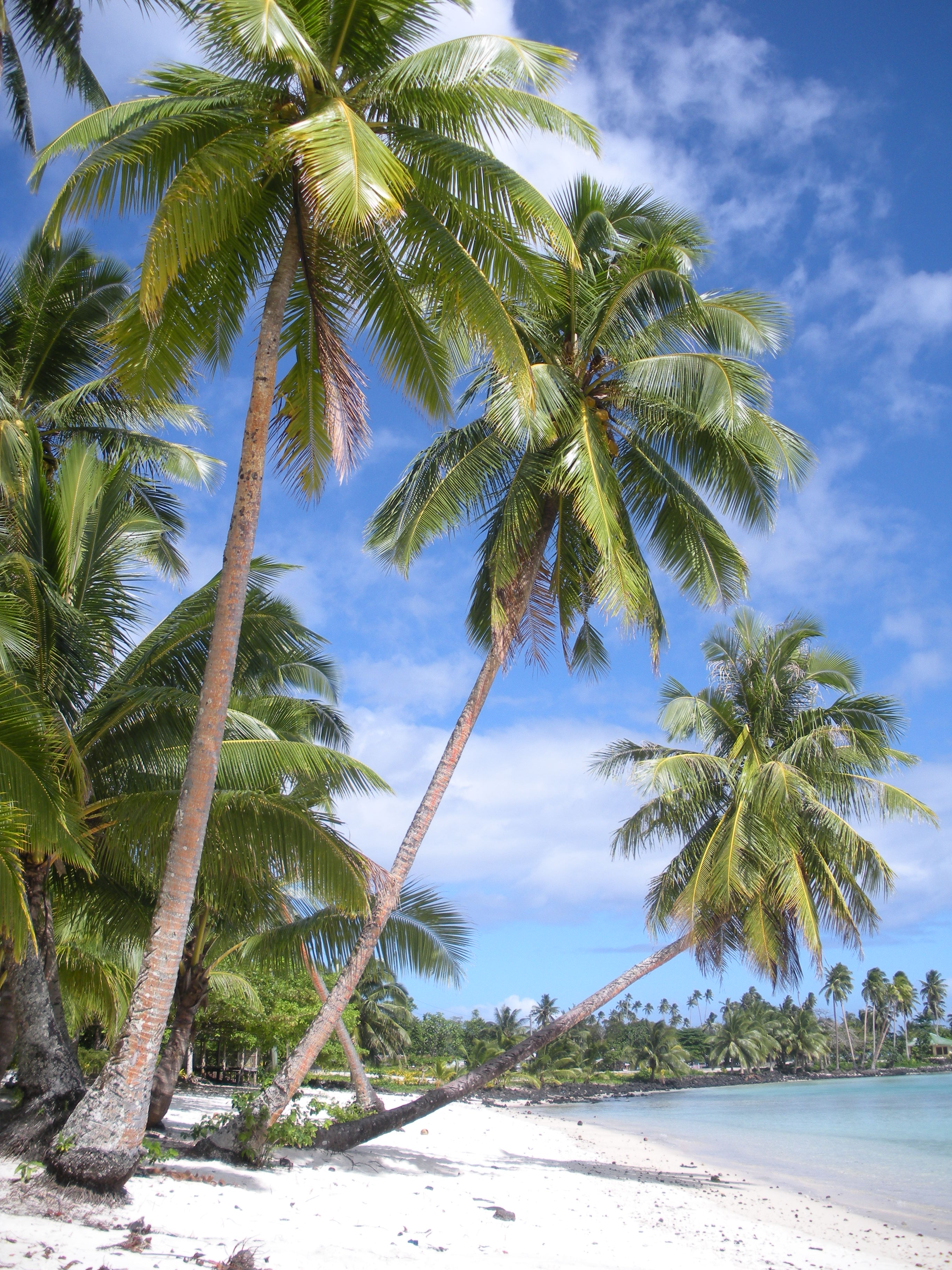
The season filmed in Upolu in Samoa.

The 20 contestants were assigned tribes at the start of the game and, based only on appearances, were instructed to elect a leader who would make critical decisions at challenges for the first half of the game. The leader of the tribe that won the reward challenge would also choose a member of their tribe to observe the other tribe for a day, receiving a clue to the hidden immunity idol at the other tribe's camp. Mick was chosen as Foa Foa's leader, and Russell S. as Galu's.

At Foa Foa, Russell H. attempted to make living conditions harsher for his tribe by dumping water out of canteens and burning socks, leading to Foa Foa losing nearly every challenge. Russell H. managed to find his tribe's hidden immunity idol at his own camp and, after making alliances with virtually all of his tribe mates, amassed a huge amount of influence among the members of his tribe. Galu's winning streak led to a relaxed state at the camp, a condition that Shambo resented, putting her at odds with the tribe. After Galu won a reward challenge, Russell S. opted to send Shambo over to Foa Foa for one night, where she found the tribe had a strong work ethic and welcomed her. Russell S. was removed from the game due to fatigue, and Galu elected Shambo as their new leader in order to gain her loyalty.

The two tribes merged with twelve players left: four from Foa Foa and eight from Galu. Natalie from Foa Foa was able to convince the Galu women to vote off one of their own, Erik. At this vote, Russell H. had played his hidden immunity idol, but it was all for naught as Erik was eliminated. Russell H. managed to find the idol in its new location before the next tribal council. He played his new idol there, saving himself from being voted off as he was targeted by every Galu member. With ten players remaining, Shambo decided to align with the Foa Foa alliance, which led to a 5-5 tie. John from the Galu alliance, paranoid that he would get eliminated from the game by a random rock draw, switched his vote on the tiebreaker to send off a Galu. This put the Foa Foa alliance in the majority. Foa Foa systematically eliminated the former Galu members. However, their plans were halted when Brett (the final member of the Galu alliance) won three immunity challenges in a row. Perceived as physically drained, and unlikely to beat Brett in the coming immunity challenges, Shambo and Jaison were voted out. With four players remaining, Russell H. ended Brett's immunity streak in the final four immunity contest. Brett was the final player voted out.

Russell H., Mick, and Natalie were the final three. At the Final Tribal Council, Mick was ignored by the jury, given his lack of leadership when assigned that role and his seemingly lackluster enthusiasm for the game. Though Russell H. felt confident that Natalie would be viewed by the jury as a coattail rider while he would be seen as a topnotch player, the jury lambasted his poor social connections, whilst Natalie was praised for her quieter, adaptive gameplay. Natalie was ultimately named the Sole Survivor over Russell H. and Mick by a vote of 7–2–0.

Challenge winners and eliminations by episode
| Episode | | | Challenge winner(s) | | Eliminated | |
| No. | Title | Original air date | Reward | Immunity | Tribe | Player |
|---|---|---|---|---|---|---|
| 1 | "The Puppet Master" | September 17, 2009 | Foa Foa | Galu | Foa Foa | Marisa |
| 2 | "Taking Candy From a Baby" | September 24, 2009 | Galu | | Foa Foa | Mike |
| 2 | "Taking Candy From a Baby" | September 24, 2009 | Galu | | Foa Foa | Betsy |
| 3 | "It's Called a Russell Seed" | October 1, 2009 | Galu | | Foa Foa | Ben |
| 4 | "Hungry for a Win" | October 8, 2009 | Galu | Foa Foa | Galu | Yasmin |
| 5 | "Walking on Thin Ice" | October 15, 2009 | Galu | Galu | Foa Foa | Ashley |
| 6 | "This Is the Man Test" | October 22, 2009 | None (Note: Russell S. collapsed during the challenge; Jeff cancelled the challenge and neither tribe won the reward.) | | Galu | Russell S. |
| 7 | "Houdini Magic" | October 29, 2009 | Galu | Galu | Foa Foa | Liz |
| 8 | "All Hell Breaks Loose" | November 5, 2009 | None (Note: There was no reward challenge due to the merge.) | John | Aiga | Erik |
| 8 | "All Hell Breaks Loose" | November 5, 2009 | None | Laura | Aiga | Erik |
| 9 | "Tastes Like Chicken" | November 12, 2009 | Dave, John, Kelly, Monica, Shambo | Laura | Aiga | Kelly |
| 10 | "The Day of Reckoning" | November 19, 2009 | Brett, Dave, Laura, Natalie, Russell H. | Mick | Aiga | Laura |
| 11 | "The First 27 Days" | November 26, 2009 | Recap Episode | | | |
| 12 | "Off With Their Heads!" | December 3, 2009 | Survivor Auction | Jaison | Aiga | John |
| 13 | "Damage Control" | December 10, 2009 | None | Jaison | Aiga | Dave |
| 13 | "Damage Control" | December 10, 2009 | None | Brett | Aiga | Monica |
| 14 | "Two Brains Are Better Than One" | December 17, 2009 | Jaison, Russell H., Shambo | Brett | Aiga | Shambo |
| 15 | "This Game Ain't Over" | December 20, 2009 | None | Brett | Aiga | Jaison |
| 15 | "This Game Ain't Over" | December 20, 2009 | None | Russell H. | Aiga | Brett |
| 16 | "The Reunion" | December 20, 2009 | | | | |

In the case of multiple tribes or castaways who win reward or immunity, they are listed in order of finish, or alphabetically where it was a team effort; where one castaway won and invited others, the invitees are in brackets.

== Episodes ==
| No. overall | No. in season | Title | Rating/share (household) | Rating/share (18-49) | Original release date | U.S. viewers (millions) | Weekly rank |
|---|---|---|---|---|---|---|---|
| 274 | 1 | "The Puppet Master" | 6.8/11 | 3.6/11 | September 17, 2009 | 11.66 | #12 |
When the preselected tribes arrived ashore, Jeff handed each of the tribes pens and parchment and instructed the tribes that they would each elect a leader based solely on appearance. Mick and Russell S., the elected leaders for Foa Foa and Galu respectively, selected participants in the first Reward Challenge; as directed by Jeff, they chose who they believed to be the best swimmer, the strongest person, the most agile, and the smartest person on their tribes.: Reward Challenge: A designated swimmer would swim out into the ocean to retrieve a key and swim back. The swimmer would hand the key to the designated strong person to unlock a chain around two bundles of heavy logs. The logs would have to be carried to the next station where a designated agile person would use the log bundles to climb on top of a balance beam. The agile person would need to pull a second key along a rope twisted around the balance beam while remaining on top of the balance beam. At the final stage, a designated smart person would use the second key to unlock a bag of puzzle pieces and use them to assemble a statue. The first tribe to assemble their statue would win flint.; When Foa Foa won the challenge, Jeff tossed maps to both tribes and sent them on their way. At Foa Foa, Mick downplayed his role of leader to stay "under the radar", believing that the leader always has a huge target on his head. Meanwhile, Russell H. quickly made secret "dumbass girl alliances" with Ashley, Betsy, Marisa, and Natalie; nevertheless, Betsy was suspicious and didn't trust him. At night in Foa Foa, Russell H. told a completely fabricated story to his tribe of his experience of Hurricane Katrina in his house in New Orleans, Louisiana; later, he emptied all the canteens and burned Jaison's socks. His strategy revolved around the idea that if he could control how his tribe felt, he could control how they think. Russell H.'s strategy began to affect the tribe as tribemates became more irritable.: Immunity Challenge: Six members from each tribe would race across a series of three wooden A-frames carrying three coils of rope. At the end of the course, the six would use the rope to pull a heavy wooden crate across a ramp and up to the finish platform. The four remaining tribe members would disassemble the crate to use as puzzle pieces. The first tribe to solve the puzzle would win.; When Foa Foa lost the Immunity Challenge, discussions of whom to vote out began when Mike talked about voting out the physically weakest: in his opinion, Ashley. Since Marisa was skeptical of Russell H.'s quickly-made alliance with her, the latter immediately targeted her for elimination. At Tribal Council, his plan to eliminate Marisa came together, and she was voted out.
| 275 | 2 | "Taking Candy From a Baby" | 6.7/11 | 3.7/11 | September 24, 2009 | 11.66 | #22 |
Russell H. assumed a Hidden Immunity Idol was somewhere around camp and went searching for it. He located the idol, without the help of any clues, in the roots of a large tree. After taking the idol and hiding it in his underwear, he showed the idol to Jaison to create some trust between them.: Reward/Immunity Challenge: In a walled off arena, three members of each tribe would battle for control of three balls. Once a castaway gets control of a ball, they would pass the ball to three other tribe members standing on a platform who would attempt to throw the ball through the opposing tribe's basket at the other end of the arena. One point would be scored when a ball is made in the basket. After every point, the tribes would change who was in the arena and on the platform. The first tribe to score three points would win tribal Immunity and fishing gear.; At the combined Reward and Immunity Challenge, after many dirty attacks during the game, Jeff stated that the next dirty attack would result in getting kicked out of the challenge. Moments later, Ben kicked Russell S. in his leg. Jeff called a time out and kicked Ben out of the challenge, resulting in Foa Foa being short one member. In the end, Galu triumphed over Foa Foa. When the challenge ended, Jeff announced a twist—the leader of the winning tribe would select one member of the tribe to accompany the losing tribe back to their camp and observe them through the next Tribal Council. When Russell S. selected Yasmin, Jeff gave her a note to be read in private. Jeff also asked Mike to stay so the Survivor Medical Team could examine him due to the hard hits he received. The Survivor Medical Team determined that he would be unable to continue and pulled him from the game. At Galu, Shambo went spearfishing with the tribe's new fishing gear; however, when she came back with no fish and a missing mouthpiece to the swim mask, Laura felt that Shambo had "signed her own death warrant". At Foa Foa, Yasmin, the observer, came off as rude to the Foa Foa members. Ben and Yasmin had a heated conversation involving racial controversy about Ben's "cheap shot". At Tribal Council, Betsy, knowing her head was on the chopping block, attempted to sway her tribe to vote out Ben; the attempt, however, proved ineffective, and she was unanimously voted out.
| 276 | 3 | "It's Called a Russell Seed" | 6.9/11 | 3.7/11 | October 1, 2009 | 11.54 | #22 |
Upon returning from Tribal Council, Jaison talked to Mick about voting out Ben next because of what Jaison perceived as racist comments made by Ben about Yasmin. Multiple stories went around about who was "stirring up the pot".: Reward/Immunity Challenge: A pair of castaways from each tribe would swim out into the ocean to retrieve one of four crates with a different color on each face of a crate. Between the beach and crates would be a "battle zone" marked off by four flags. Within this zone, an opposing tribe member would try to prevent the two castaways from crossing the zone and reaching the crate. Once the two castaways crossed the zone, they would bring a crate back to the beach, and a second pair of castaways would go out to retrieve another crate. Once all four crates were retrieved, the crates would need to be stacked so that one color didn't show more than once on each column. The first tribe to complete the puzzle would win comfort items of pillows, candles, mats, beach towels, and a hammock.; At the combined Reward and Immunity Challenge, Galu never lost their lead and won their third consecutive challenge. After the challenge was over, Jeff gave Russell S., Galu's leader, an option of trading the reward of comfort items for more functional items such as fishing gear, a pot, a lantern, and a tarp. Believing it would be delightful to the Galu women, Russell S. chose the comfort items. Many of the tribe's men disagreed with his choice. When Russell S. was also given the decision on whom to send as the observer to Foa Foa, he chose Shambo. Her visit with Foa Foa went great, and she began to feel more comfortable with them than Galu. When discussions arose about whom to vote out, Liz and Russell H., as well as Ben, gunned for Ashley, but Mick was unsure if he would agree with them or vote for Ben. Russell H. made an agreement with Mick that as long as the latter would not vote for him, Ben would be the next gone after Ashley. In an attempt to gain Mick's trust, Russell H. showed the Hidden Immunity Idol to him. At Tribal Council, Ben and Jaison voiced their disagreement about whether Ben's statements were racist. The tribe decided to vote against Ben, and he was unanimously voted out.
| 277 | 4 | "Hungry for a Win" | 7.0/11 | 3.4/10 | October 8, 2009 | 11.69 | #19 |
The day's tree mail instructed the tribe leaders to select two castaways to join them at the upcoming Reward Challenge; Russell S. chose Dave and Shambo, while Mick chose Natalie and Russell H. While his tribemates were not around, Erik began a search for the Hidden Immunity Idol at Galu and succeeded. Meanwhile, at Foa Foa's campsite, Russell H. pondered about changing his "final two alliance" from Jaison to Natalie, believing that he could tell the jury Natalie rode his coattails; Natalie, on the other and, felt confident that she would beat Russell H. in a final vote and privately stated that she would continue to play to her strengths, laying low and forming personal relationships. Upon arriving at the challenge site, the six selected castaways realized Jeff was nowhere to be seen. After some hesitation, the six made a scramble towards a treasure chest and a cage of chickens. In the treasure chest, they discovered instructions that they were to do the challenge on their own.: Reward Challenge: Three castaways from each tribe would play a game similar to bocce. A flag would be placed in the center of a circle. The castaways would take turns tossing three balls each at the flag. The tribe who throws a ball closest to the flag would win three chickens.; Dave won the challenge with a last ricochet shot. When the victorious Galu trio returned to Galu with the reward, Shambo was assigned to watch over the chickens, but she mistakenly let one loose.: Immunity Challenge: The castaways would race across a net run carrying wooden blocks to a platform. When all of the blocks were at the platform, they would need to be stacked into a tower. The castaways would then cross a rope bridge to a second platform where two nets would be tied together holding more wooden blocks. After the nets were untied, the blocks would have to be stacked into another tower. The first tribe to stack both towers would win.; When Foa Foa broke Galu's Immunity Challenge win streak, deliberations began about how Tribal Council would go down. Brett and Kelly were both upset at Yasmin for doing nothing around camp, while Shambo and Yasmin wanted to vote out Monica because of her performance in the challenge. When Russell S. was told that the rest of the tribe was leaning towards voting out Yasmin, he was upset that the tribe was not following his lead. However, at Tribal Council, he followed the majority, and Yasmin was voted out.
| 278 | 5 | "Walking on Thin Ice" | 7.1/11 | 3.5/10 | October 15, 2009 | 11.78 | #19 |
Shambo felt more alienated from her tribe when she realized that she was the only one besides Yasmin to vote for Monica at Tribal Council, and she became more attached to her Foa Foa "tribemates".: Reward Challenge: Two castaways would face off against each other by spinning a roulette-like wheel with various food items on it that would be blended together and have to be drunk by the castaways. The castaway would score one point if they were able to drink the whole glass. The challenge would not be a race and there was no time limit on getting the food item down. The first tribe to score five points would win steaks, sausages, and onions.; At the Reward Challenge, the chance for Foa Foa to win rested on Ashley's shoulders. After much taunting from the Galu bench, she quit the challenge and lost for her tribe. Per the rules, Galu's leader, Russell S., chose Shambo as the observer for the second time, a decision which infuriated her; he selected Shambo because he felt she had to pay for the loss of the chicken. Upon reaching the opposing tribe's camp, Shambo shared all of the clues to the Hidden Immunity Idol with the Foa Foa members. Liz presumed Russell H. to have the Hidden Immunity Idol, however, and confronted him about it. He denied he had it and then threatened Liz for confronting him.: Immunity Challenge: One man and one woman from each tribe would hold on to a rope that would suspend a net. The castaways from the other tribe would attempt to toss coconuts into the net which would weigh it down, making it more difficult to hold onto the rope. Should the net touch the ground, the castaway would be eliminated from the challenge. The castaway who held on to the rope the longest without letting the net touch the ground would win for their tribe.; At the Immunity Challenge, Russell H. was the first to drop his net, and Liz dropped her net shortly afterward, losing the challenge for Foa Foa. Back at camp, rain had been pouring down for more than a day, and the Foa Foa members were forced to huddle together. Russell H. originally wanted Liz out because she had confronted him, but had second thoughts after seeing her strength in the Immunity Challenge. He also knew that Ashley was clearly the weakest link in the tribe. Foa Foa was unable to strategize, however, as the rain kept them together in the shelter. At Tribal Council, Liz's challenge strength helped her, and Ashley was unanimously voted out to maintain a strong tribe.
| 279 | 6 | "This Is the Man Test" | 7.7/12 | 4.0/11 | October 22, 2009 | 12.88 | #17 |
The rain continued for the fifth straight day, but ended soon thereafter. Both tribes were extremely thankful.: Reward Challenge: One castaway would be strapped into a wooden spherical cage and would have to guide two blindfolded castaways in rolling the cage through a maze through the forest. At the end of the maze would be a labyrinth-like table maze. The castaway inside the cage would then have to guide four blindfolded castaways in solving the table maze. The first tribe to finish the table maze would win pizza while observing the losing tribe at Tribal Council.; At the Reward Challenge, Jeff announced that both tribes would be going to Tribal Council that night to vote somebody out of the game. Foa Foa selected Liz to be the guide with Jaison and Russell H. as cage-rollers, while Galu selected Laura to be the guide with Erik and Russell S. as cage-rollers. Towards the end of the cage-rolling stage, with Foa Foa in the lead, Russell S. became disoriented and struggled to make it to the puzzle table. When he collapsed at his station onto the puzzle table, Jeff called for a halt so the Survivor Medical Team could tend to Russell S. After examination, they found that he had dangerously low blood pressure which was even worse than Mike's injury was. Jeff officially called off the challenge and stated that although neither tribe would win the reward, both would still go to Tribal Council and vote somebody off. Moments later, as the medical team tried to sit him up, Russell S. blacked out again with his eyes open. The medical team tried to ask him if he remembered what just happened and told Jeff that Russell S.'s heart rate went from 97 (when they set him up) to 68. The medical team eventually decided it was time for him to be pulled from the game. Russell S. protested at first; saying his family depended on this and that he was just a little dehydrated. However Jeff said that after what he saw happen in front of him; including blacking out two times in front of him there would be no way Russell S. would stay in the game and that if he didn't get any help he would get worse. Feeling his frustration, Jeff reminded Russell S. that he was in great shape and had led a tribe that dominated, that there had been no sign earlier of him going home and he pushed himself until the end. Back at Foa Foa, the vote was between Natalie and Liz, while at Galu, the women targeted Shambo for being an outsider, while the men targeted Monica for being a liability in challenges. At Tribal Council, when the two tribes arrived at the site, Jeff explained Russell's condition, how he was removed from the game, and what had happened to Russell S. after the two tribes had been sent back to their respective camps. Jeff made a final announcement that due to the unprecedented circumstances of the incomplete challenge, including how big of an impact that Russell S. had on the Galu tribe, there would be no vote and nobody else would be going home. Before departing, Jeff told Galu that they would need to select a new tribe leader.
| 280 | 7 | "Houdini Magic" | 6.9/11 | 3.7/10 | October 29, 2009 | 12.19 | #15 |
The men of Galu conspired to vote Shambo in as the new leader of the tribe to secure her loyalty to them, but they kept her in the dark about their plans.: Reward Challenge: The castaways would play a variation of Concentration with thirteen pairs of survival items plus four unpaired dummy items hidden under covers. One tribe member at a time would uncover two items. If the items matched, they would score one point for their tribe. However, the tribe leaders would have the option of forfeiting the point and taking the uncovered pair. The tribe with the most points at the end of the challenge would win a sailing trip aboard a three-masted barque and lunch, and the items collected for the points forfeited for either tribe.; At the Reward Challenge, Brett, who was designated to make decisions on which items to keep, forfeited the first point to keep the then-uncovered fire starting kit. The remaining matched pairs were kept for points, and Galu easily won the challenge. Shambo chose Laura to miss the reward and observe Foa Foa, much to the anger of the latter. While at Foa Foa, Russell H. attempted to ally with Laura; unknown to him, though, Laura didn't trust him. Laura and Natalie connect through their similar interests and shared religious beliefs. Liz annoys Russell H by complaining about this, as he views Natalie's ability to connect with others as useful to him.: Immunity Challenge: The tribes would paddle out into the ocean to retrieve six sets of fish-shaped puzzle pieces. Once back on the beach, three tribe members would have to assemble the puzzle pieces. The first tribe to assemble their puzzle would win.; When the Immunity Challenge was won by Galu, Russell H. considered voting Jaison instead of Liz due to his poor performance in the challenge, but because Liz was considered untrustworthy, the other four tribe members came together, and she was voted off.
| 281 | 8 | "All Hell Breaks Loose" | 7.3/11 | 3.7/10 | November 5, 2009 | 12.44 | #20 |
The tribes arrived at the challenge site as instructed by tree mail. Jeff was not there, and a lone treasure chest lay on the beach. When the castaways opened the chest, they saw new blue buffs and supplies to create a new tribe flag. The note stated that the newly merged tribe would move to the old Galu campsite, and there was a feast down the beach for them. After the feast, the castaways settled on Aiga, meaning "extended family" in Samoan, as a tribe name. Russell H. scrambled around camp, showing his Hidden Immunity Idol to John, Laura, and Monica and made conflicting deals with each of them to no avail. He then turned a disgruntled Shambo away from her tribe and gained support from her in voting out Laura.: Immunity Challenge: The castaways would play a variation of T-ball with the men competing against the men and the women against the women. The playing field would be divided into sections with different point values. Each castaway would take one swing at the ball. Wherever the ball comes to a stop would be that castaway's score. Two castaways, one man and one woman, with the highest score would win immunity.; At the Immunity Challenge, Jeff explained that there would be an immunity necklace for the highest-scoring man and woman. With Laura's immunity win, Russell H.'s plan to vote out Laura collapsed. John also won immunity. Laura informed Erik that the Hidden Immunity Idol was in Russell H.'s hands, and he conspired with others. Erik pulled Jaison, Natalie, and Mick aside and instructs them to vote out Monica, and convince Russell H he is the target to waste his idol. Natalie utilizes her connection with Laura, Monica, and Kelly to expose Erik and campaign for his eviction. Russell H agrees to vote for Erik, but dismisses Natalie's belief that she has flipped the Galu women. At Tribal Council, Russell H., confident that he was the actual target, played his Hidden Immunity Idol. Not a single vote was cast against him. Erik, not noticing the blindside coming, was voted out with the idol in his pocket.
| 282 | 9 | "Tastes Like Chicken" | 7.5/12 | 4.0/11 | November 12, 2009 | 12.94 | #18 |
Upon returning from Tribal Council, Russell H. was shocked to find that he had wasted his Idol, as he had felt certain Galu was voting for him and hadn't at all questioned whether to play it. In the morning, Natalie stumbled upon a rat and, out of hunger, smashed it for food. This surprised the rest of the tribe, as Natalie had provided a good breakfast for all, and Jaison commented on how proud he was of her growth throughout the game thus far.: Reward Challenge: The tribe would split into two teams of five, with one castaway sitting out the challenge. Two castaways at a time, the teams would race out into a field to collect a series of poles with black and white colored coconuts. The poles would have to be arranged so that the white coconuts form a four digit number. One blindfolded team member would then have to use their sense of touch to unlock a multiple-dial combination lock using the four digit number. The first team to unlock their lock would win a trip to a waterfall rock slide and a picnic lunch.; At the Reward Challenge, the purple team of Dave, John, Kelly, Monica, and Shambo took the win. While eating their picnic lunch, they received a clue to a new Hidden Immunity Idol. The group planned only tell Brett and Laura to keep the knowledge in Galu's hands. When the five discussed which former Foa Foa member to vote out next, Shambo’s defense of Russell H. made Kelly suspicious of her loyalties. Upon returning from camp, Russell H. found another Hidden Immunity Idol without the help of a clue and informed Shambo. In return, she told him about Galu's plot against him.: Immunity Challenge: The castaways would have to toss a grappling hook to retrieve two bags with a wooden peg in each bag. The first three castaways to retrieve their bags would move on to the final puzzle round. In the final round, the castaways would untie the bags and try to insert one of the uniquely shaped pegs into board, which would release another peg. That peg would fit into another hole, which releases another peg, and so on until the board was full. The first castaway to complete their puzzle would win.; At the Immunity Challenge, Russell and Shambo’s fear came true when Laura won immunity for the second time in a row. The whole of Foa Foa plus Shambo targeted Kelly. Galu still believed Russell H. would be going home. At Tribal Council, a blindside of Kelly occurred when Russell H. pulled out his second Hidden Immunity Idol, and the seven Galu votes against him were negated. The remaining votes sent Kelly home.
| 283 | 10 | "The Day of Reckoning" | 7.2/11 | 3.8/11 | November 19, 2009 | 12.33 | #19 |
When the tribe returned to their campsite, Russell H. went searching for his third Hidden Immunity Idol.: Reward Challenge: The tribe would be split into two teams. One castaway from each tribe would be hoisted aloft in a cradle held up by four ropes controlled by the other team members. The castaway in the cradle would have to be maneuvered around the playing field to collect fifteen numbered flags in order and placed into a slot in a log. The first team to collect all fifteen flags would win a plane trip to Savai'i and a picnic lunch at a waterfall.; At the Reward Challenge, the purple team of Brett, Dave, Laura, Natalie, and Russell H. won the challenge; they were given a Palm Pre to use during their picnic lunch. The castaways were informed the phone contained clues to a new Hidden Immunity Idol. Laura informed the others there was a video - that each player was able to view - revealing a clue to the whereabouts of the idol. The 8 second video showed it was hidden under a rock somewhere near camp. Upon returning from the reward, Russell H. immediately took off in search of it. He finally found the idol after a long chase through the forest.: Immunity Challenge: Each castaway would throw one stone at a set of three hanging tiles. For each tile broken, they would earn one spear to be used in the next round. The castaways would use a crossbow to shoot the spears they earned at a target. The castaway that shoots their spear closest to the center of the target would win.; At the immunity challenge, Mick and Jaison each broke one of their tiles, Dave broke one of Monica's tiles but none of his own, and Brett broke two of his tiles. In the final round, Mick came out on top with his spear closest to the center of the target to win his first immunity. When they arrived back from the Immunity Challenge, John and Russell H. debated on how the voting would go down; if John were to switch his vote to Laura after a tie, the next person voted out would be a former Foa Foa. John's first instinct was to let the Tribal Council vote to go the infamous "purple rock" tiebreaker and then hope that one of the former Foa Foa would be sent home. At Tribal Council, the vote came to a 5–5 tie between Laura and Natalie. Per the rules, a second vote was held where Laura and Natalie would not vote and the remaining eight castaways would have to vote for one of the two. When the votes were cast again, John changed his vote and Laura was sent home.
| 284 | 11 | "The First 27 Days" | 5.3/11 | 3.1 | November 26, 2009 | 9.94 | #23 |
Recap of the first 27 days with never before seen footage.
| 285 | 12 | "Off With Their Heads!" | 7.5/12 | 3.9/11 | December 3, 2009 | 12.82 | #7 |
The day's treemail contained envelopes full of US$500, signaling a Survivor Auction. Unlike previous Survivor Auctions, money and food could not be shared. Jaison bid high on a sealed container with a note that would give him an advantage at the Immunity Challenge, and John received an additional clue to the Hidden Immunity Idol.: Immunity Challenge: With one hand, the castaways would hang on to a rope with several knots tied into it. The rope would be tied to one end of a heavy log. The other end of the log would be connected to a pivot point on a platform that the castaways would stand on. The castaways would start at the knot closest to the end of the log. Every three minutes, they would change hands and move one knot further down the rope. This would increase the angle of the log at the pivot point and increase the weight that the castaways would have to hold. The castaway who held on to the rope the longest would win.; At the challenge, Jaison opened the container; the note stated that Jaison could move up two knots on his rope at any time during the challenge. Because this gave him a significant advantage, Jaison won the Immunity Challenge by outlasting Dave. Back at camp, the tribe decided to eat the chickens won by Galu in a previous Reward Challenge. Shambo, the chickens' caretaker, took control of the cooking and insisted on boiling the chickens. She was infuriated when Dave, who had won the chickens for his tribe, suggested on another method of cooking. That night, Shambo had "a clairvoyant dream" in which the tribe had voted out Dave. The next day, Russell H. confronted John about the missing Hidden Immunity Idol and revealed to the latter the idol. Later, Russell H. realized that he had made a mistake in showing John the idol and felt that he needed get rid of John immediately to cover up the mistake. He organized a plan to vote John out with his Foa Foa alliance. John did not see through the Foa Foa pact, and at Tribal Council, the Foa Foa plan came together—stunning Shambo in the process—and John was voted out.
| 286 | 13 | "Damage Control" | 7.6/12 | 4.2/12 | December 10, 2009 | 13.25 | #11 |
After returning to camp from Tribal Council, Shambo was stunned about the vote going against John. To calm down the infuriated Shambo, Russell H. said he voted out John because he was gunning for her. She bought the lie, but she insisted that Dave had to go next. The argument between Russell H. and his tribe about the former's US$1.7 million salary proved that there were cracks forming in the Foa Foa alliance. When the tribe arrived at the challenge site, Jeff announced they would be playing for immunity, not the expected reward.: Immunity Challenge: The castaways would compete in a bowling tournament. The castaways would be randomly matched against another castaway and given two rolls. The castaway who knocks down the most pins moves on to the next round. The remaining castaways would compete in another round and so forth until a winner is determined.; Jaison took his second immunity win in a row, while Shambo reaffirmed her statement that Dave was going home at the next Tribal Council. After the challenge, Dave knew that he was the "lowest man on the totem pole" in the tribe. Russell H. debated between Dave and Shambo. However, at Tribal Council, Shambo got her wish, and Dave was unanimously voted out. Russell H. thought that Brett was the biggest threat to him remaining as he was well liked by the jury, so he started to work on voting out Brett with the Foa Foa alliance.: Immunity Challenge: The castaways would swim out into the ocean to retrieve one of three bags. They would then swim back and have to launch the bag up into a basket on top of a tower by jumping on a plank setup like a seesaw. The first castaways to get their three bags into the basket would win.; At the Immunity Challenge, Brett edged out Mick to win Individual Immunity, much to the alliance's disappointment. Brett's win solidified the Foa Foa theory that he could quite possibly win again, forcing the alliance to vote out one of their own at the next Tribal Council. Russell H. told the rest that Monica was to be voted out first. Monica stirred the pot by informing Russell H. that Natalie had previously told her about Russell H.'s salary—she later corrected herself and stated it was rather Jaison who revealed the information. Monica's plot to anger Russell H. worked, and he went off to confront his alliance members about Monica's story; after confronting Brett and Natalie, he went to Jaison, who denied it because he had forgotten he told Brett and Monica those stories. Jaison felt nervous around Russell H. and believed the latter should be eliminated soon. When the castaways sat down at Tribal Council, Russell H. flaunted the Hidden Immunity Idol pulled out it out and placed it around his neck. Monica commented that she was busy stirring the pot and infuriating Russell H. with her rumors. She laughed about Russell H.'s open display of confidence in wearing his Idol. Because Brett was immune, Monica was the only vulnerable person outside of the core group of four Foa Foas plus Shambo, so Monica was sent home.
| 287 | 14 | "Two Brains Are Better Than One" | 7.3/12 | 3.9/12 | December 17, 2009 | 12.46 | #16 |
In the tribe's shelter, Brett and Natalie felt a connection through their shared interest in religion as Brett recited verses of the Bible from memory.: Reward Challenge: Coconuts would be suspended in the air by intertwined ropes on a frame. The castaways would be split into two teams. One at a time, each castaway would select a rope to remove, which would cause coconuts to be released and drop to the ground. The first team to cause 100 coconuts to drop would lose. The winning team would receive a trip to a local village with a feast and overnight stay.; At the Reward Challenge, the castaways drew stones to be team captains; when Natalie, one of the team captains, selected Brett first, Russell H. and Shambo were suspicious of an alliance that would need to be broken up immediately. This was partially brought up when Brett and Natalie joined hands as "prayer warriors" to help them through the challenge. After Jaison, Russell H., and Shambo won the challenge, they went on their reward trip. Jaison told Russell H he agreed to go to the top three together. The winning trio also discussed the possibility of a Brett–Natalie alliance and that they had to put a stop to it immediately by voting out Brett or Mick next. Back at camp, Brett suggested the three from the losing team create their own reward by spending the day at the beach hunting for snails. When Russell H. returned to camp, he talked with Natalie about her picking of Brett at the Reward Challenge. She reassured him that her and Russell H.'s "final two alliance" from early in the game was still strong.: Immunity Challenge: The castaways would run out into a field to six different stations and count the number of objects (pigs, crabs, rocks, coconuts, octopuses, and fish) at each station. The count of the objects would be used to unlock a combination lock. The order of the numbers in the combination lock would be different for each castaway. The first castaway to open his or her lock and break the tile would win.; Brett won Immunity for the second time in a row. Jaison figured the former Foa Foa needed to be as strong as possible to prevent Brett from winning any further Immunity Challenges, and told Russell H. that Shambo would need to go next due to her poor performance in challenges. When Shambo approached the conversation, Jaison quickly scrambled off. Russell H. told Shambo, suspicious that Jaison was hiding something, that Jaison was upset, that he wanted to vote out Mick, and that Russell H. agreed with the vote. Mick was surprised when Russell H. told him that Shambo was getting on his nerves and she needed to go. At Tribal Council, Russell H. once again openly wore his Hidden Immunity Idol, but did not use it the last time it could be played. Shambo was voted out.
| 288 | 15 | "This Game Ain't Over" | 7.6/12 | 4.4/11 | December 20, 2009 | 13.97 | #12 |
The remaining four Foa Foa members concentrated on getting rid of Brett, feeling that he didn't deserve to be there. Russell H. talked to Natalie about how they could keep her in the game, warning her that if Brett were to win the next Immunity Challenge, she would be voted off to keep the strongest possible in the game in the hopes of voting off Brett.: Immunity Challenge: The castaways would race across a rope net and a balance beam to retrieve a bag of puzzle pieces. Once back with the bag, they would climb up a steep wall to a platform where they would assemble the puzzle pieces. The first castaway to assemble their puzzle, the Survivor: Samoa logo, would win.; Russell H. was again extremely confident going into the Immunity Challenge, but while he had an early lead, Brett came from behind during the puzzle assembly stage and pulled off his third immunity win in a row. Natalie and Russell H. again discussed what the plans were for Tribal Council. Russell H. wanted to keep Natalie around, as he felt that she would be seen by the jury members as "riding his coattails" and therefore not get any votes. Russell H. told Jaison that they had to keep Natalie and get rid of Mick to make it to the final three, which Jaison agreed with. Russell H. told Mick a different story: Jaison could not beat Brett in anything, and voting off Jaison would give them a better chance at beating Brett. Mick agreed with the plan, believing that Jaison wasn't mentally in the game while Natalie was. With the vote split—Jaison and Mick agreeing to vote for each other—the power of who went home fell to Natalie and Russell H. They decided to vote against Jaison, and he was sent home blindsided by a vote of 4–1. Upon returning to camp, Brett knew that he had to win the next Immunity Challenge or he would be going home. Russell H. made a deal with Brett that should either of them win the next Immunity Challenge, that they would take each other to the final three. The final four took the traditional journey honoring the castaways voted out before heading to their Final Immunity Challenge.: Immunity Challenge: The castaways would balance a wooden statue on top of a pole which they would have to keep upright holding the bottom of the pole. At regular intervals, an additional 1-foot (30-cm) section would be added to the end of the pole, making the pole longer and harder to balance. The last castaway still holding the statue up would win.; The challenge came down to Brett and Russell H.; with the poles at 7 feet (2.1 m) long, Brett lost the balance on his pole and Russell H. won his first Individual Immunity. Brett figured that his only hope to remain in the game was the deal he made with Russell H. Russell H. gloated about his challenge win to Mick and Natalie and said that he thought he had a great shot at the million dollars and was already rehearsing his jury speech. Mick was concerned that Russell H. had some secret plan and that Mick was going home, but Natalie reassured him that the former Foa Foa would stick together. Russell H. told Brett that he had a problem because he had made a deal with everybody to take them to the final three. Russell H. told Brett that Brett was the kind of guy that Russell H. wanted his kids to marry and he wished he was like Brett when he was young. Russell H. told Brett that Mick and Natalie would be voting against him and asked if Brett could win a fire starting challenge if Russell H. joined Brett in voting for Mick, forcing a tie. At Tribal Council, Mick and Natalie stated that there was no doubt in their mind that Brett was going home. Jeff asked Russell H. if he could appreciate the competitor in Brett. Russell H. answered that he respected the game and that Brett deserved to be in the final three. Mick and Natalie emphasized that strategically, Russell H. had to vote out Brett. In the end, Russell H. voted against Brett and he became the final jury member by a vote of 3–1. With only three Foa Foa members left, Mick, Natalie, and Russell H. celebrated with the traditional Day 39 breakfast. Russell H. pressed Natalie over what she was going to say to the jury and he continued to gloat over how he had locked up the necessary jury votes. He even threatened to "put her in the jury", even though the jury stage of the game was over. The three then burned their encampment. At the final Tribal Council, the final three made their opening statements. Mick stated that he tried to play the game without overstepping his morals by trying not promise too much, overtly stomp on, lie, and mislead people, or treat them as pawns in the game. Natalie focused on how she came into the game wanting to gain the confidence in going outside her comfort zone and that she appreciated everybody on the jury. Russell H. went over many of his big strategic moves throughout the game and claimed he played the game better than Mick or Natalie. The time then came for the jury to ask their questions to the final three. Jaison was up first, asking the three to tell the members of the jury who they really were and if they didn't, that he would. All three told the jury what they did, but Jaison pointed out that both Natalie and Russell H. had made a lot of money before coming on Survivor, that Mick had the potential to make a lot of money, and that the jury should not focus who was broke, but on other criteria. Shambo took the opportunity to apologize to America for dismantling Galu and that she questioned that judgment call. She called Mick's overall game play "feckless", a word of which Mick did not know the meaning. She used the word "coattail" to describe Natalie, to which Natalie defended that she purposefully tried not to be aggressive in the game. Shambo then said that there was no way that Mick and Natalie would get her vote and said nothing to Russell H. Brett asked nothing of Natalie or Russell H., but asked Mick what a "bro date" would be like with him to see to what level Mick invested in Brett as a human being. Kelly started with Natalie, telling her that she thought she was never on the field in the game and that Kelly always saw Natalie asking for help in the challenges, to which Natalie said that while she might not have been good in the challenges, but she gave 100% and that she got better as the game progressed. She asked Russell H. if he lied, cheated, and stole in real life as he did in the game, to which Russell H. said that he did not and that "honor, integrity, and loyalty" was the most important thing to him, which she had a hard time believing. She said nothing to Mick. Next up was Monica, who asked Mick and Natalie why they felt the other two sitting beside them did not deserve to win. Mick said that Natalie rode out her alignment with Russell H. throughout the game and that Russell H. was willing to lie, pit people against each other, mislead, and had a giant ego. Russell H. interrupted Mick's answer by stating that both Natalie and Mick didn't mind when Russell H. was being a snake and was congratulating him all the way. Monica appeared amused, said that she had heard enough, and sat down. Dave asked the three what they thought their chances were with the jury. Mick thought it was 20–25%, Natalie 30–40%, and Russell H. said that his chances were a lot higher prior to Final Tribal Council but were now 55%. Laura asked nothing of Natalie or Mick but asked Russell H. what he learned about her that enabled him to beat her, to which he generically stated that she was a threat. John asked nothing of Russell H. but asked Mick and Natalie for the "hard sell" of his vote. Mick repeated the theme of his opening statement that he was a stand-up guy, while Natalie said that she saw how the aggressive women in the game were getting voted out and that she adapted her game after that. Erik asked no questions of the final three and instead made statements to the three. He told Mick that he did nothing to deserve the title of being the tribe leader of Foa Foa. He told Russell H. that he played an unethical game and wondered if Russell H. got to the right place by behaving the wrong way and if Russell H. was proud of behaving in such a manner. Finally, Erik told Natalie that people would call her weak and undeserving, but asked why those characteristics were any less admirable than lying, cheating, and stealing. He went on to say that maybe she would call herself the less deserving of the title Sole Survivor, but that in an environment filled with "arrogance" (pointing to Russell H.) and "delusional entitlement" (pointing to Mick), that the person who might think she is the least deserving, could probably be the most. Erik closed his speech by saying that Natalie had his vote and hoped she would get four more.
| 289 | 16 | "Reunion" | 6.4/11 | 3.8/10 | December 20, 2009 | 11.68 | #17 |
Months later, the game was revealed that Natalie became the Sole Survivor over Russell H. and Mick by a vote of 7–2–0. The castaways discuss the season with host, Jeff Probst.

== Voting history ==
| | Original tribes | | | | | | | | Merged tribe | | | | | | | | | |
| Episode | 1 | 2 | | 3 | 4 | 5 | 6 | 7 | 8 | 9 | 10 | | 12 | 13 | | 14 | 15 | |
|---|---|---|---|---|---|---|---|---|---|---|---|---|---|---|---|---|---|---|
| Day | 3 | 5 | 6 | 8 | 11 | 14 | 15 | 18 | 21 | 24 | 27 | | 30 | 31 | 33 | 36 | 37 | 38 |
| Tribe | Foa Foa | Foa Foa | Foa Foa | Foa Foa | Galu | Foa Foa | Galu | Foa Foa | Aiga | Aiga | Aiga | | Aiga | Aiga | Aiga | Aiga | Aiga | Aiga |
| Eliminated | Marisa | Mike | Betsy | Ben | Yasmin | Ashley | Russell S. | Liz | Erik | Kelly | Tie (Note: The first Tribal Council Vote resulted in a tie. Per the rules, a second vote was held where the castaways involved in the tie would not vote and the remaining castaways could only vote for the two tied.) | Laura | John | Dave | Monica | Shambo | Jaison | Brett |
| Vote | 7–3 | Evacuated (Note: No vote; Mike was medically evacuated from the game.) | 7–1 | 6–1 | 8–2 | 5–1 | Evacuated (Note: No vote; Russell S. was medically evacuated from the game due to dehydration.) | 4–1 | 10–2 | 4–0 (Note: Russell H. played a Hidden Immunity Idol, so the seven votes cast against him did not count.) | 5–5 | 5–3 | 7–1–1 | 7–1 | 5–2 | 5–1 | 4–1 | 3–1 |
| Voter | Votes | | | | | | | | | | | | | | | | | |
| Natalie | Marisa | | Betsy | Ben | | Ashley | | Liz | Erik | Kelly | Laura | None (Note: This player was not eligible to vote in the second round of voting.) | John | Dave | Monica | Shambo | Jaison | Brett |
| Russell H. | Marisa | | Betsy | Ben | | Ashley | | Liz | Erik | Kelly | Laura | Laura | John | Dave | Monica | Shambo | Jaison | Brett |
| Mick | Ashley | | Betsy | Ben | | Ashley | | Liz | Erik | Kelly | Laura | Laura | John | Dave | Monica | Shambo | Jaison | Brett |
| Brett | | | | | Yasmin | | | | Erik | ~~Russell H.~~ | Natalie | Natalie | John | Dave | Russell H. | Shambo | Jaison | Mick |
| Jaison | Marisa | | Betsy | Ben | | Ashley | | Liz | Erik | Kelly | Laura | Laura | John | Dave | Monica | Shambo | Mick | |
| Shambo | | | | | Monica | | | | Jaison | ~~Russell H.~~ | Laura | Laura | Dave | Dave | Monica | Mick | | |
| Monica | | | | | Yasmin | | | | Erik | ~~Russell H.~~ | Natalie | Natalie | John | Dave | Russell H. | | | |
| Dave | | | | | Yasmin | | | | Erik | ~~Russell H.~~ | Natalie | Natalie | John | Shambo | | | | |
| John | | | | | Yasmin | | | | Erik | ~~Russell H.~~ | Natalie | Laura | Mick | | | | | |
| Laura | | | | | Yasmin | | | | Erik | ~~Russell H.~~ | Natalie | None | | | | | | |
| Kelly | | | | | Yasmin | | | | Erik | ~~Russell H.~~ | | | | | | | | |
| Erik | | | | | Yasmin | | | | Jaison | | | | | | | | | |
| Liz | Marisa | | Betsy | Ben | | Ashley | | Jaison | | | | | | | | | | |
| Russell S. | | | | | Yasmin | | Evacuated | | | | | | | | | | | |
| Ashley | Marisa | | Betsy | Ben | | Liz | | | | | | | | | | | | |
| Yasmin | | | | | Monica | | | | | | | | | | | | | |
| Ben | Marisa | | Betsy | Ashley | | | | | | | | | | | | | | |
| Betsy | Ashley | | Ben | | | | | | | | | | | | | | | |
| Mike | Marisa | Evacuated | | | | | | | | | | | | | | | | |
| Marisa | Ashley | | | | | | | | | | | | | | | | | |

Jury vote
| Episode | 16 | | |
|---|---|---|---|
| Day | 39 | | |
| Finalist | Natalie | Russell H. | Mick |
| Votes | 7–2–0 | | |
| Juror | Vote | | |
| Brett | Yes | | |
| Jaison | Yes | | |
| Shambo | | Yes | |
| Monica | Yes | | |
| Dave | Yes | | |
| John | | Yes | |
| Laura | Yes | | |
| Kelly | Yes | | |
| Erik | Yes | | |

== Production ==
=== Casting ===
Participant applications were due by January 14, 2009. Approximately 800 were invited to be interviewed in several states. Following this, approximately 48 semi-finalists were invited to Los Angeles in April 2009 for final interviews with the producers. From there, 20 finalists were selected to be contestants in the show, which was scheduled to occur between mid June and mid-July 2009 in Samoa. Similar to Survivor: Tocantins, the minimum age requirement for this season was 18 for most states.

== Reception ==
Survivor: Samoa has received wildly polarizing opinions from both fans and critics. The primary criticism is aimed at the perceived overexposure of contestant Russell Hantz. Critics believe this was done to an extent that it rendered many of the other contestants, including winner Natalie White, unmemorable due to their lack of screen time. However, not all opinions of the season were negative. The gameplay of Hantz, which was seen as very unorthodox compared to other Survivor players, garnered high praise from fans, allowing him to win the Fan Favorite Award for the season. Hantz's cutthroat attitude and ability to find hidden immunity idols without a clue propelled him into becoming one of the most infamous villains in the show's history. Dalton Ross of Entertainment Weekly ranked this season 15th out of 40. In 2015, a poll by Rob Has a Podcast ranked this season 15th out of 30, with Rob Cesternino ranking this season 8th. This was updated in 2021 during Cesternino's podcast, Survivor All-Time Top 40 Rankings, ranking 25th out of 40. The Purple Rock Survivor Podcast listed Samoa as the twenty-second best season out of 40. They claim the season is, "incredibly divisive, and understandably so. It is impossible to think of this season without thinking of one specific player, and your feelings about that player will likely determine how you rate this season." Inside Survivor listed the season as the twenty-sixth best out of 40, claiming that, "if Survivor was going to continue into its second decade, it needed a kick up the ass—something to revitalize the format and push it forward into a new generation. Survivor: Samoa was the start of that, in large part thanks to a trilby-wearing oil company owner named Russell Hantz." In 2014, The Wire ranked the season as the third-worst of the series (only ahead of Gabon and Redemption Island). In 2024, Nick Caruso of TVLine ranked this season 33rd out of 47.
