= Bulan, Kermanshah =

Bulan بولان
- Village
- Location within Iran
- Coordinates: 34°41′09″N 47°10′30″E
- Country: Iran
- Province: Kermanshah
- County: Kermanshah
- Bakhsh: Central
- Rural District: Poshtdarband

Population (2006)
  - Total: 247
- Time zone: UTC+3:30 (IRST)
  - Summer (DST): UTC+4:30 (IRDT)

Bulan (Persian: بولان, also Romanized as Būlān) is a village in Poshtdarband Rural District, in the Central District of Kermanshah County, Kermanshah Province, Iran. At the 2006 census, its population was 247, in 51 families.
