= Colleen Haskell =

American actress

- Born: December 6, 1976 (age 49); Bethesda, Maryland, U.S.
- Television: Survivor: Borneo (6th place)

Colleen Marie Haskell (born December 6, 1976) is an American former reality show contestant, actress, and producer. She was a contestant on the first season of the American reality show Survivor in 2000. She also co-starred in the comedy film The Animal.

== Survivor ==
=== Borneo ===
Haskell was a contestant on the original season of Survivor in 2000. She was a castaway on the Pagong tribe alongside B.B. Andersen, Greg Buis, Gretchen Cordy, Ramona Gray, Joel Klug, Jenna Lewis and Gervase Peterson. Haskell initially formed a bond with Buis, which is sometimes cited as the show's first 'showmance'.

The two tribes merged into the Rattana tribe at the final ten, where the Tagi tribe had planned to vote out all the Pagong members systematically beforehand, where Haskell was the last remaining original Pagong member to be voted out, making her the fourth member of the jury.

At the final tribal council, Haskell had planned to vote for Richard Hatch but after Sue Hawk's infamous "rats and snakes" speech and disliking Hatch's answer to her question, she voted for Kelly Wiglesworth to win. Wiglesworth would go on to lose to Hatch in a 4-3 vote.

=== Post-show ===
Haskell was expected to reappear on Survivor during the All-Stars edition in 2004. Producer Mark Burnett later confirmed that Haskell was offered a spot on the show, but she turned down the offer, saying that she had "moved on with her life and just genuinely didn't want to go through that again".

== Career ==
After competing on Survivor, Haskell starred in the 2001 feature film comedy The Animal, playing Rianna, the love interest of Rob Schneider's character.

Haskell also appeared in an episode of That '70s Show as a love interest of Hyde. In 2002, Haskell appeared in the TV show Maybe It's Me. She worked as an assistant producer on The Michael Essany Show in 2003 before leaving the entertainment industry.

== Filmography ==
Year	Title	Role	Other notes
2000	Survivor: Borneo	Contestant	6th place
2001	The Animal	Rianna Holmes	
2001	That '70s Show	Colleen	"Hyde Gets the Girl" (Season 4, Episode 4)
2002	Maybe It's Me	Olivia Castle	"The Rick's in Love Episode" (Season 1, Episode 19)
