= Gervase Peterson =

American television personality and actor

- Born: November 2, 1969 (age 56); Philadelphia, Pennsylvania, U.S.
- Television: Survivor: Borneo; Survivor: Blood vs. Water; (2nd runner-up)
- Relatives: Marissa Peterson (niece)

Gervase Peterson (/ˈdʒɜːrvəs/; born November 2, 1969, in Philadelphia, Pennsylvania) is an American television personality and actor who was a contestant on Survivor: Borneo, the first edition of the popular CBS reality television series Survivor, which premiered in May 2000, and was the highest rated American series during the summer of that year. He came in seventh place. Peterson returned in 2013 to compete on Survivor: Blood vs. Water and ultimately ended up in the finals, finishing third place with zero jury votes.

== Survivor ==
=== Borneo ===
During the original Survivor season, Survivor: Borneo, Peterson worked only when necessary, and was able to successfully preserve much of his strength until the individual challenges in the later rounds. Although at times it made him appear lazy, he claims that this was part of his strategy. As a member of the Pagong tribe, Peterson was one of the first Survivor contestants who was forced by circumstance to eat cooked rat for sustenance. In one episode, he made a disparaging remark about women, stating that "nothing is dumber than a woman, except maybe a cow." However, his teammate Joel Klug laughed so hard that the comment was attributed to him, and the female members of Pagong voted Klug off at the next opportunity. After the two tribes merged into Rattana, Peterson (like all the remaining members of Pagong) did not realize that former Tagi members Richard Hatch, Kelly Wiglesworth, Rudy Boesch, and Susan Hawk had formed a voting alliance until the Pagong faction had been outnumbered and outmaneuvered. The Tagi alliance, along with former Tagi member Sean Kenniff, eliminated Peterson. At the Final Tribal Council, he voted for Wiglesworth to win the title of sole Survivor, but she ultimately lost to Hatch by a vote of 4–3.

Amidst the fervor that swept the nation during Survivor: Borneo, a hacker announced that he had gained access to an area of the CBS Survivor website containing a photo array of the 16 contestants. An "X" was displayed across the picture of everyone except Peterson. This led many to believe that the network had inadvertently revealed Peterson to be the winner. A few episodes later he was voted off, and CBS admitted that its so-called snafu was done purposely to fool viewers and pundits as a way of keeping the true winner's identity secret (the Final Tribal Council, where Hatch was voted the winner, had been pre-recorded along with the rest of the season).

=== Blood vs. Water ===
Peterson competed for a second time on the show's 27th season, Survivor: Blood vs. Water. Peterson was cast along with his niece Marissa, with Peterson joining the Galang tribe of veteran contestants while Marissa joined the Tadhana tribe of the returning players' loved ones. After his excessive celebrating of the Galang tribe's first victory, the Tadhana tribe decided to retaliate by voting out Marissa. In the third Redemption Island duel, Marissa was defeated by the husband-and-wife duo of Candice and John Cody, finishing in 17th place. Peterson was switched to the Tadhana tribe after a tribal swap but eventually made it to the merged Kasama tribe. Throughout the entire season, he served as the right-hand man of alliance leader Tyson Apostol. In the penultimate Tribal Council, and the final chance to use a hidden immunity idol, Apostol gave his second immunity idol to Peterson, who used it to negate the two votes that were cast against him. Peterson made it to the Final Three, along with Apostol and Monica Culpepper, but Peterson received no votes. Apostol won the game with seven of the eight jury votes, while Culpepper received one vote.

== Post-Survivor ==
=== Acting and modeling ===
Like several members of the Survivor: Borneo cast, Peterson has attempted to parlay his popularity into an acting career. Thus far, his most notable role has been that of absentee father Leo Thompson, whom he portrayed in 2001 on the CBS daytime drama As the World Turns. Other television appearances include Son of the Beach, The Hughleys, and Nash Bridges. He had starring roles in the independent films 13th Grade and Hell's Threshold, and also appeared in White Men Can't Rap and L-O-V-E. Additionally, he made a cameo appearance in The Scorned, which featured numerous personalities from American reality television.

Peterson appeared in the Bravo series Battle of the Network Reality Stars, which pitted familiar reality television personalities against each other in a competition reminiscent of ABC's Battle of the Network Stars from the 1970s and 1980s. Initially, Peterson was the captain of Team Light Blue, but when contest rules allowed two teams to choose a member from each other's roster, he was selected by Team Red. The finale aired on September 21, 2005, the same night as Bravo's All Star Reality Reunion, in which Peterson also appeared.

With the exception of his stint on Survivor, Peterson is always seen with a fully shaven head. He has been selected as one of the celebrity representatives for the HeadBlade, a razor designed specifically for men who shave their heads.

He has also modeled clothing for Southpole.

=== Sports ===
In 2006, Peterson became co-owner of the Pennsylvania ValleyDawgs, a franchise in the United States Basketball League. However, the team folded later that year due to financial difficulties. The USBL replaced it with the Albany Patroons.

In 2009, Peterson participated in a celebrity boxing match sponsored by the Celebrity Boxing Federation. Fighting as a light heavyweight, he defeated adult film entertainer Travis Knight.

== Filmography ==
=== Film ===
| Year | Title | Role | Notes |
|---|---|---|---|
| 2005 | The Scorned | Randy | TV movie |
| 2006 | Hell's Threshold | Sam Bishop | |
| 2008 | Leaf | Seattle Narrator | |
| 2010 | Watching the Detectives | Otis Kaygee | Short |
| 2012 | Mancation | Passenger 57 | |
| 2012 | The Meat Puppet | Chris Irvine | |
| 2013 | Gravedigger | Maurice Evans | |
| 2014 | Jersey Justice | Wright | |
| 2017 | The Evangelist | Troy Dallas | |
| 2018 | Rock, Paper, Scissors | Miguel | |
| 2020 | Stealing a Survivor | Himself | |
| 2021 | A Holiday Homecoming | Uncle Vic | TV movie |

=== Television ===
| Year | Title | Role | Notes |
|---|---|---|---|
| 2000 | Survivor: Borneo | Contestant | Eliminated; 7th place |
| 2013 | Survivor: Blood vs. Water | Contestant | 2nd runner-up |
| 2014 | Underground Kings | Anthony "Jonesy" Jones | |
| 2020 | Kindly Kenney | Darius's Dad (voice) | |
| 2022 | Welcome to Hope | Uncle Vic | |

== Personal life ==
A native of Philadelphia, Pennsylvania, Peterson grew up in Willingboro Township, New Jersey, and attended Holy Cross Academy. He now resides in the suburb of Philadelphia, Cinnaminson. Peterson was co-owner of Burnz Cigar Vault & Lounge in Lawnside, New Jersey; It is listed as closed since May of 2026.
