= Battle of the Network Reality Stars =

- Genre: Reality television
- Presented by: Mike Adamle
- Country of origin: United States
- Original language: English
- No. of seasons: 1
- No. of episodes: 6

Production
- Production company: Trans World International

Original release
- Network: Bravo
- Release: August 17 – September 21, 2005

Battle of the Network Reality Stars is an American television series that aired on the Bravo cable network from August 17 until September 21, 2005. Based on the popular 1970s and 1980s television competition Battle of the Network Stars, the show consisted of thirty-three competitors from several different reality television shows. Some of the better known contestants include Adam Mesh, from the Average Joe TV series, Richard Hatch, Survivor winner, Sue Hawk, (the Survivor player who gave the infamous "snakes and rats" speech) Ryan Starr and Nikki McKibbin of American Idol fame, Evan Marriott, of Joe Millionaire fame, and Will Kirby, winner of Big Brother season 2. Chip and Kim McAllister, winners of The Amazing Race 5, also participated. Veteran NBC sportscaster Mike Adamle hosted the show and featured reality reporters Trishelle Cannatella (The Real World: Las Vegas), Omarosa Manigault-Stallworth (The Apprentice – season 1), and Bob Guiney (The Bachelor – season 4). Austin Scarlett of Project Runway made fashion commentary in several episodes.

== Teams ==
The competitors, as divided by team (per first episode structure):

Dark Blue
Contestant	Show	Finish
Richard Hatch	Survivor: Borneo and All-Stars	Lost in final challenge
Ryan Starr	American Idol	Lost in final challenge
Valerie Penso	Temptation Island	Lost in final challenge
Burton Roberts	Survivor: Pearl Islands	Lost in final challenge
Mike "The Miz" Mizanin	The Real World: Back to New York	Lost in final challenge
Heidi Bressler	The Apprentice	Moves to Dark Blue Team episode 1 Lost in final challenge
Bradford Cohen	The Apprentice	Voted out episode 4 Returned as underdog episode 4
Mirna Hindoyan	The Amazing Race 5 and All Stars	Voted out episode 4 Returned as underdog episode 4
Charla Faddoul	The Amazing Race 5 and All Stars	Moves to Red Team episode 1

Green
Contestant	Show	Finish
Matt Gould	Joe Schmo Show	Eliminated episode 6
Sue Hawk	Survivor: Borneo and All-Stars	Eliminated episode 6
Will Kirby	Big Brother 2	Eliminated episode 6
Chip McAllister	The Amazing Race 5	Eliminated episode 6
Kim McAllister	The Amazing Race 5	Eliminated episode 6
Theo Vonkurnatowski	Road Rules: Maximum Velocity Tour	Eliminated episode 6
Nikki McKibbin	American Idol	Voted out episode 4 Returned as underdog episode 4
Brian Worth	Average Joe: Hawaii	Voted out episode 4 Returned as underdog episode 4

Red
Contestant	Show	Finish
Will Wikle	Big Brother 5	Eliminated episode 5
Coral Smith	The Real World: Back to New York	Eliminated episode 5
Evan Marriott	Joe Millionaire	Eliminated episode 5
Melissa Howard	The Real World: New Orleans	Eliminated episode 5
Gervase Peterson	Survivor: Borneo	Moves to Red Team episode 2 Eliminated episode 5
Tina "Tina Fabulous" Panas	The Bachelor	Moves to Red Team episode 2 Eliminated episode 5
Adam Mesh	Average Joe and Adam Returns	Voted out episode 4 Returned as underdog episode 4
Rachel Love Fraser	The Swan	Voted out episode 4 Returned as underdog episode 4
Duncan Nutter	Showbiz Moms & Dads	Volunteered to Leave episode 2
Charla Faddoul	The Amazing Race 5 and All Stars	Joins Red Team episode 1 Volunteered to Leave episode 2
Heidi Bressler	The Apprentice (American season 1)	Moves to Dark Blue Team episode 1

Light Blue
Contestant	Show	Finish
Mike "Mike Boogie" Malin	Big Brother 2	Eliminated episode 3
Brittany Brower	America's Next Top Model, Cycle 4	Eliminated episode 3
Jonathan Baker	The Amazing Race 6	Eliminated episode 3
Victoria Fuller	The Amazing Race 6	Eliminated episode 3
Wendy Pepper	Project Runway	Eliminated episode 3
Chris Russo	The Apprentice	Eliminated episode 3
Jerri Manthey	Survivor: The Australian Outback and All Stars	Eliminated episode 3
David Daskal	Average Joe 2	Eliminated episode 3
Gervase Peterson	Survivor: Borneo	Moves to Red Team episode 2
Tina "Tina Fabulous" Panas	The Bachelor (season 3)	Moves to Red Team episode 2

The Underdogs
Contestant	Show	Finish
Adam Mesh	Average Joe and Adam Returns	Voted out episode 4 Returned as underdog episode 4 Won final challenge
Rachel Love Fraser	The Swan	Voted out episode 4 Returned as underdog episode 4 Won final challenge
Bradford Cohen	The Apprentice	Voted out episode 4 Returned as underdog episode 4 Won final challenge
Mirna Hindoyan	The Amazing Race 5 and All Stars	Voted out episode 4 Returned as underdog episode 4 Won final challenge
Nikki McKibbin	American Idol	Voted out episode 4 Returned as underdog episode 4 Won final challenge
Brian Worth	Average Joe: Hawaii	Voted out episode 4 Returned as underdog episode 4 Won final challenge

== Episode summary ==
=== Episode 1 ===
- Obstacle Course – Teams Red and Light Blue advanced to the finals – winner Team Red
- Dunk Tank – Team Green wins with 9 points, followed by Teams Blue and Light Blue with 6, and Team Red with 1
- Jousting – Team Light Blue wins (Jonathan beats Bradford to win the final point)
- Eliminated – Teams Green, Red and Dark Blue are forced to vote off one member each. Kim and Heidi volunteer to leave due to physical weakness, and Charla is voted out.
- Twist – Instead of leaving, they are forced to move to a new team based on the number they choose. Charla goes to Team Red, Kim stays at Team Green, Heidi moves to Team Dark Blue.

=== Episode 2 ===
- Simon Says (conducted by professional Simon Says caller Steve Max and refereed by Jimmie Walker of Good Times fame) – Team Light Blue is eliminated first, followed by Team Red; Nikki of Team Green and Richard of Team Dark Blue are the final 2 – Richard wins
- Dodgeball – Teams Red and Green advance to the finals; Team Green wins
- Swimming Relay (introduced by Darva Conger of Who Wants to Marry a Multi-Millionaire?) – Team Dark Blue wins, Team Light Blue second, Team Green third, Team Red last
- Eliminated – Team Red has the lowest score of the day and must axe two players. Charla, who had volunteered to swim and then had to be replaced by Melissa at the last minute, agrees to leave; Duncan Nutter also volunteers to leave.
- Twist – As the highest-scoring team of the day, Dark Blue get to choose which two players from another team will join Red. They pick Gervase (the leader of Light Blue) and Tina Fabulous (the "spirit" of Light Blue).
- New arrivals – David Daskal (Average Joe – season 2) and Jerri Manthey (Survivor – Outback/All-Stars) replace Gervase and Tina for Light Blue. Light Blue was horrified that they had lost a great athlete (Gervase) and a solid competitor (Tina) in exchange for unathletic David and unimpressive Jerri.

=== Episode 3 ===
- Football – (guest referee William Katt) Team Dark Blue beats Team Light Blue, thanks mostly to David Daskal's putrid play; Team Green beats Team Red. Team Red beats Team Light Blue in consolation round. Team Green beats Team Dark Blue in the finals. 1) Green 2) Dark Blue 3) Red 4) Light Blue
- Soapbox Derby – Red (Gervase) 35.80, Dark Blue (Burton) 34.66, Light Blue (Jonathan) 44.58 (he fell off the soapbox and lost what little respect the team had for him), Green (Theo) 34.42 – Green wins
- Relay Race – 1) Team Dark Blue 2) Team Red 3) Team Green 4) Team Light Blue
- Twist The team with the lowest number of overall points for that day was to have been eliminated. Instead, a member of the third place team had to face off against a member of the lowest-ranking team, and the loser's team would be eliminated. Team Red (the third place team) were allowed to choose first, and chose Gervase. Team Light Blue (the last place team) had to choose a member of the same gender, and chose Chris, in spite of his having a broken foot. Jonathan wanted to run the race but the team had tuned him out and preferred to take their chances with someone who wasn't 100% physically.
- Eliminated Gervase handily beat Chris, and Light Team Blue (Jerri, David, Jonathan, Victoria, Wendy, Chris, Brittany, Mike Boogie) was eliminated. Jonathan complained about weight differences between the teams, got into an argument with wife Victoria, and was dubbed "the biggest mouth in America" by the announcer.

=== Episode 4 ===
- Twist – Each team had to vote out one male and female member. Team Green voted out Nikki and Brian. Team Red voted out Adam, and Rachel volunteered to leave. Team Dark Blue voted out Bradford and Mirna. Adam, Mirna and Nikki were shocked, as they were strong competitors, but their teams disliked their personalities. Bradford was well liked by his team but was voted out because Dark Blue had two of the strongest competitors in Mike "The Miz" and Burton Roberts. Mirna was presumably voted out because the team member she was most similar to athletically, Heidi, was better-liked by the team leaders than herself.
- Twist 2 – At the start of the day's first event, Bradford, Mirna, Rachel, Adam, Brian and Nikki arrived as "Team Underdog" to compete against the three teams that voted them out.
- Water Polo – Team Underdog defeated Team Red. Team Green defeated Team Dark Blue. In the final match, Team Green won. In the consolation match, Team Dark Blue beat Team Red to make third place.
- Mechanical Bull Riding (guest referee Ted Lange of The Love Boat fame) – Team Dark Blue won, followed by Team Green, Team Underdog, and Team Red. Coral sprained her thumb and had to stay out of the next event.
- Multilegged Race – Team Dark Blue won, followed by Team Green, Team Underdog, and Team Red.
- Eliminated – Team Red (Will Wikle, Tina, Gervase, Coral, Melissa, Evan) were eliminated. Evan said afterwards he preferred losing without Adam to winning with him.

=== Episode 5 ===
- Roller Skate Derby (guest referee Loretta Swit of MASH fame) – Team Dark Blue won, Team Green trailed for much of the race, but a poor performance by Team Underdog's Brian Worth allowed Green to come in second place. Underdog was third.
- Super High Jump – Team Dark Blue won, Team Underdog narrowly won second place and Team Green, increasingly marred by tension between Theo and Chip, came in third.
- Kayak Relay Race – Team Dark Blue won, Team Underdog won second and Green came in third. Dark Blue advanced to the final round and left Green and Underdog to determine which team would be eliminated next.

=== Finale ===
- Tug of War – Although Team Green had the advantage in physical strength, Bradford of Team Underdog had researched tug-of-war the night before the competition and his team managed to use strategy to defeat Green, who were rattled by angry outbursts from Theo and Sue. Team Green (Kim, Chip, Will, Matt, Sue, Theo) were eliminated.
- The final competition to determinate the winner of Battle of the Network Reality Stars was divided into four parts:

Horse – Each player on each team had to sink one basketball into the hoop. The first team to sink each basket spelled out B-A-T-T-L-E and advanced to the next round. After some brief difficulty for Burton, Dark Blue won while Underdog were left with four more baskets to sink. Rachel and Bradford had some problems but the team soon advanced.
Golf – Each player had to make a putt, with each succeeding player being forced to stand at a greater distance than the previous player. The first team to make all six putts spells out B-A-T-T-L-E and moves on to the next round. Dark Blue finished first while Brian and then Adam still struggled to sink their putts.
Reality Results Board – Both teams had to remember which team placed where in every single one of the 40 challenges over the course of the series. Dark Blue started first, but since Underdog was made up of people who had once played on the Red, Green and Dark Blue teams, they finished first.
The Wall (with Lou Ferrigno of The Incredible Hulk, along with previously eliminated players, there to offer advice and moral support) – The first team to get all six team members up a steep wall wins. Bradford and Mirna climbed the rope, but Rachel couldn't. Nikki was then pulled up, followed by Adam. Dark Blue finally got there and Ryan and Burton finished while Underdog tied the rope around Rachel's waist and pulled her up. Miz finished, but Dark Blue still had 3 players left on the ground as Brian neared the top of the wall. Brian finished, giving Team Underdog a come-from-behind victory. After winning, Mirna--sarcastically--thanked Ryan and the other Dark Blue team members for voting her off.

== Reunion ==
Hosted by Kathy Griffin, Bravo's All-Star Reality Reunion, which aired the same night as the finale (September 21, 2005) featured all cast members save Rachel, Theo, Melissa, Jonathan, Victoria, Wendy Pepper, Trishelle and Bob Guiney.

Alumni from other reality series also participated in the reunion. They were:

Heather (The Bachelor seasons 2 & 6), Dat Phan (winner, Last Comic Standing season 1), Erin (For Love or Money seasons 1 & 2), Cindy (The Swan season 1), Brennan (winner, Amazing Race 1), Gary (The Biggest Loser season 1), Norm (Real World season 1), Jason (Average Joe), Ivana Ma (The Apprentice season 2), Pamela (Apprentice season 2), Jay London (Last Comic Standing seasons 2 & 3), Ryan C. Benson (winner, The Biggest Loser season 1), Tara (Paradise Hotel, Life as a Model), Mark (Average Joe season 1), Reichen Lehmkuhl (winner, Amazing Race 4), Michael Tarshi (Apprentice season 3), Kyra Sundance and dog Chelsea (Showdog Moms & Dads), Brandon Kindle (Are You Hot? and Showdog Moms & Dads) and his partner Ryan Pacchiano (Showdog Moms & Dads) and their dog Liberace, Angela Dodson (Joe Schmo Show season 1), and Kara Saun (Project Runway).

Discussions included their current careers, how they were treated after their respective series aired, Omarosa's disclosure that being a villain is the best way to garner money and public notoriety, and an update on various feuds from other series (Ryan vs. Nikki on American Idol, Omarosa vs. Heidi on Apprentice and Richard vs. Sue on Survivor).
