= Survivor: Blood vs. Water =

- Season 27
- Region 1 DVD cover
- Presented by: Jeff Probst
- No. of days: 39.5
- No. of castaways: 20
- Winner: Tyson Apostol
- Runner-up: Monica Culpepper
- Location: Palaui Island, Philippines
- No. of episodes: 15

Release
- Original network: CBS
- Original release: September 18 – December 15, 2013

Additional information
- Filming dates: May 19 – June 27, 2013

Season chronology
- ← Previous; Caramoan — Fans vs. Favorites Next → Cagayan — Brawn vs. Brains vs. Beauty

Survivor: Blood vs. Water is the 27th season of the American CBS competitive reality television series Survivor. The season filmed in May–June 2013 and premiered on Wednesday, September 18, 2013, featuring returning castaways and their loved ones competing against each other. It was the third consecutive season, and the ninth season overall, to feature returning contestants. As with the previous two seasons, the season was filmed in the Philippines and this was the third season filmed in the country, but this time at Palaui Island, Cagayan. Tyson Apostol was named the Sole Survivor in the season finale on December 15, 2013, defeating runners-up Monica Culpepper and Gervase Peterson in a 7–1–0 vote.

== Format ==
Survivor is a reality television show based on the Swedish show Expedition Robinson, created by Mark Burnett and Charlie Parsons. The series follows a number of participants isolated in a remote location, where they must provide food, fire, and shelter. One participant is removed from the series by majority vote every three days, with challenges held to give a reward (ranging from living- and food-related prizes to a car) and immunity from being voted out of the series. The last remaining player receives a prize of $1,000,000.

== Contestants ==
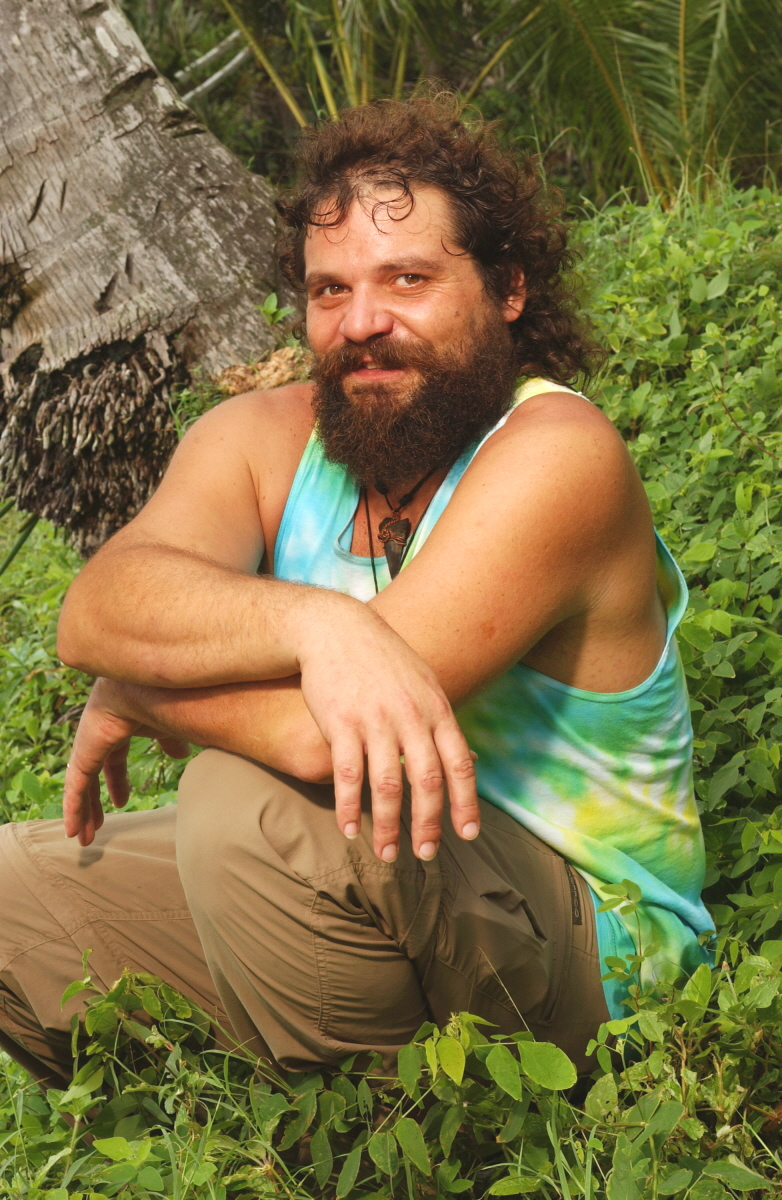
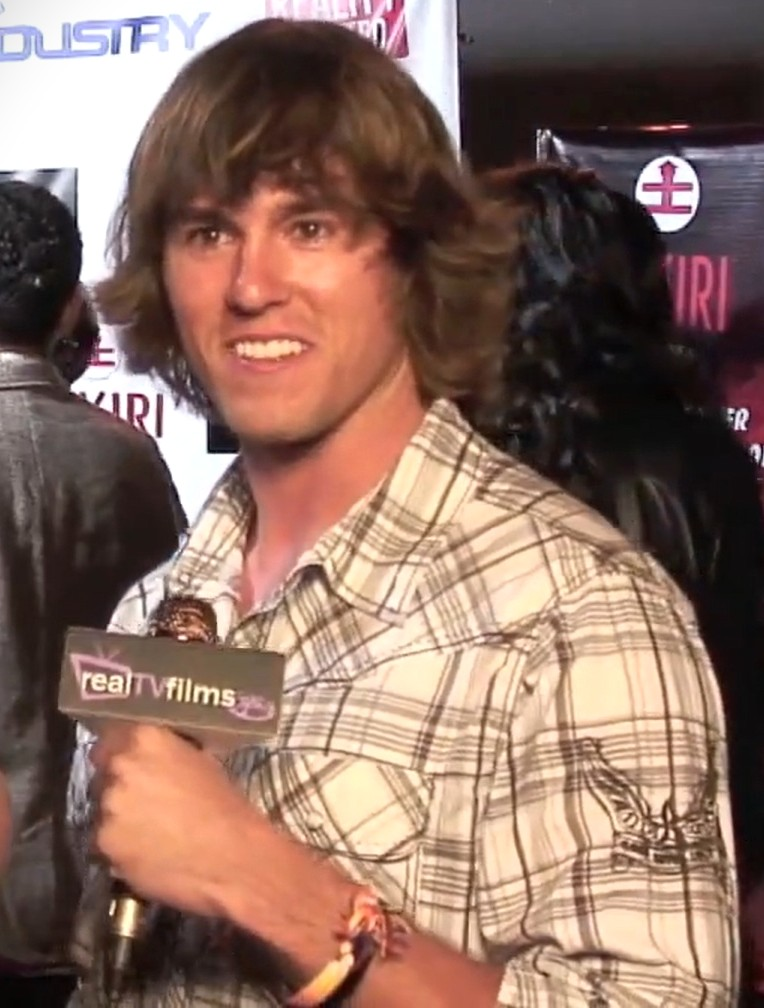
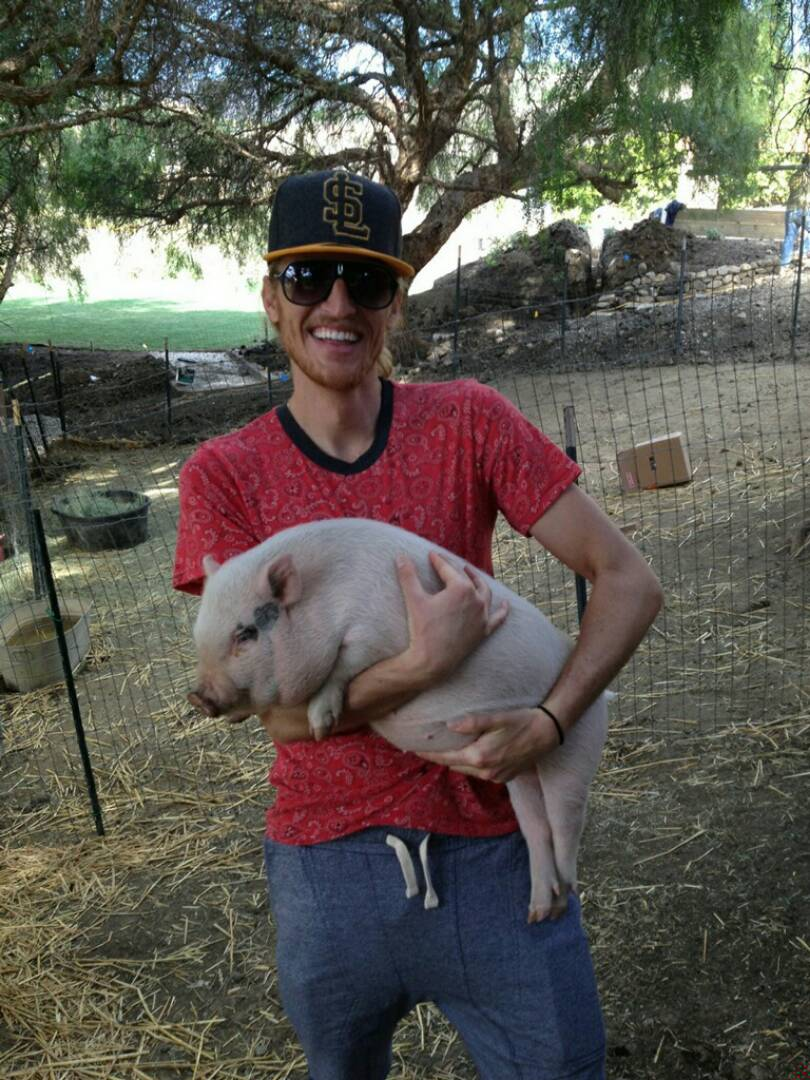
From left to right: Rupert Boneham, Hayden Moss, and Tyson Apostol

The cast consists of 10 pairs of loved ones, each composed of one new player and one returning player with varying relationships, including mother-daughter, spouses, fiancees, dating, brothers, and uncle-niece. The tribe names were Galang and Tadhana, which means "respect" and "destiny", respectively, in Filipino. The merged tribe was Kasama, which means "companion" in Filipino. Notable cast includes former NFL player Brad Culpepper, competing alongside his wife, Survivor: One World castaway Monica, and Big Brother 12 winner Hayden Moss, playing alongside his girlfriend Kat Edorsson, also from One World. Moss is the first former Big Brother contestant to appear on Survivor. The cast also contained two former Survivor winners, Tina Wesson and Aras Baskauskas.

List of Survivor: Blood vs. Water contestants
Contestant	Age	From	Tribe			Main game (Note: Elimination order is based on when the contestant was voted out at Tribal Council.)		Redemption Island	
Contestant	Age	From	Original	Switched	Merged	Finish	Day	Finish	Day
Laura Boneham (Remained in game) (Note: After Laura B. and Candice were voted onto Redemption Island, Rupert elected to take Laura B.'s place. As a result, Laura B. remained in the game, taking Rupert's place on the Galang tribe.)			Tadhana			1st voted out	Day 1	Switched places	Day 1
Laura Boneham (Remained in game)			Galang			1st voted out	Day 1	Switched places	Day 1
Candice Cody Cook Islands & Heroes vs. Villains	30	Washington, D.C.	Galang			2nd voted out	Day 1	Lost duel 4	Day 11
Rupert Boneham Pearl Islands, All-Stars & Heroes vs. Villains	49	Indianapolis, Indiana	Galang			Switched places	Day 1	Lost duel 1	Day 4
Marissa Peterson Gervase's niece	21	Chapel Hill, North Carolina	Tadhana			3rd voted out	Day 3	Lost duel 3	Day 9
Rachel Foulger Tyson's girlfriend	33	Provo, Utah	Tadhana			4th voted out	Day 6	Lost duel 2	Day 7
Colton Cumbie One World	22	Collinsville, Alabama	Galang			Quit	Day 7		
John Cody Candice's husband	30	Washington, D.C.	Tadhana			5th voted out	Day 8	Lost duel 7	Day 19
Brad Culpepper Monica's husband	44	Tampa, Florida	Tadhana			6th voted out	Day 10	Lost duel 5	Day 14
Laura Morett (Returned to game)			Galang			7th voted out	Day 13	1st returnee	Day 19
Katrina "Kat" Edorsson One World	23	Orlando, Florida	Galang	Galang		8th voted out	Day 16	Lost duel 6	Day 17
Laura Boneham Rupert's wife	44	Indianapolis, Indiana	Tadhana	Galang		9th voted out	Day 18	Lost duel 7	Day 19
Laura Boneham Rupert's wife	44	Indianapolis, Indiana	Galang	Galang		9th voted out	Day 18	Lost duel 7	Day 19
Aras Baskauskas Panama	31	Santa Monica, California	Galang	Tadhana	Kasama	10th voted out	Day 21	Lost duel 8; 1st jury member	Day 25
Vytas Baskauskas Aras's brother	33	Santa Monica, California	Tadhana	Galang	Kasama	11th voted out	Day 22	Lost duel 9; 2nd jury member	Day 27
Tina Wesson (Returned to game)			Galang	Galang	Kasama	12th voted out	Day 24	2nd returnee	Day 36
Laura Morett Samoa	43	Salem, Oregon	Galang	None (Note: Laura M. was not assigned a tribe during the tribe switch due to being on Redemption Island.)	Kasama	13th voted out	Day 26	Lost duel 12; 6th jury member	Day 36
Caleb Bankston Colton's fiancé	26	Collinsville, Alabama	Tadhana	Tadhana	Kasama	14th voted out	Day 29	Lost duel 10; 3rd jury member	Day 30
Katie Collins Tina's daughter	25	New York City, New York	Tadhana	Galang	Kasama	Eliminated (Note: Due to a deadlocked tie after two rounds of voting and the non-tied contestants being unable to come up with a unanimous decision to vote out either Hayden or Monica, Ciera, Katie and Tyson drew rocks to resolve the vote. Katie picked the white rock and was therefore sent to Redemption Island.)	Day 32	Lost duel 11; 4th jury member	Day 33
Hayden Moss Kat's boyfriend	27	Springtown, Texas	Tadhana	Tadhana	Kasama	15th voted out	Day 35	Lost duel 12; 5th jury member	Day 36
Ciera Eastin Laura M.'s daughter	24	Salem, Oregon	Tadhana	Tadhana	Kasama	16th voted out 7th jury member	Day 37		
Tina Wesson The Australian Outback & All-Stars	52	Robbinsville, North Carolina	Galang	Galang	Kasama	17th voted out 8th jury member	Day 38		
Gervase Peterson Borneo	43	Philadelphia, Pennsylvania	Galang	Tadhana	Kasama	2nd runner-up	Day 39		
Monica Culpepper One World	42	Tampa, Florida	Galang	Galang	Kasama	Runner-up	Day 39		
Tyson Apostol Tocantins & Heroes vs. Villains	34	Provo, Utah	Galang	Tadhana	Kasama	Sole Survivor	Day 39		

=== Future appearances ===
Ciera Eastin, Vytas Baskauskas, and Brad Culpepper were included on the public poll to choose the cast of Survivor: Cambodia. Eastin and Baskauskas were chosen to compete; while Culpepper was not. Culpepper eventually returned, along with Eastin, for Survivor: Game Changers. Monica Culpepper also appeared on Survivor: Game Changers as a loved one. Tyson Apostol later returned to compete on Survivor: Winners at War. Rachel Foulger also appeared on Survivor: Winners at War as part of the loved ones visit.

Outside of Survivor, Rupert and Laura Boneham competed as a team in The Amazing Race 31. In 2022, Apostol competed on the first season of The Challenge: USA. In 2026, Apostol competed on the third season of House of Villains.

== Season summary ==
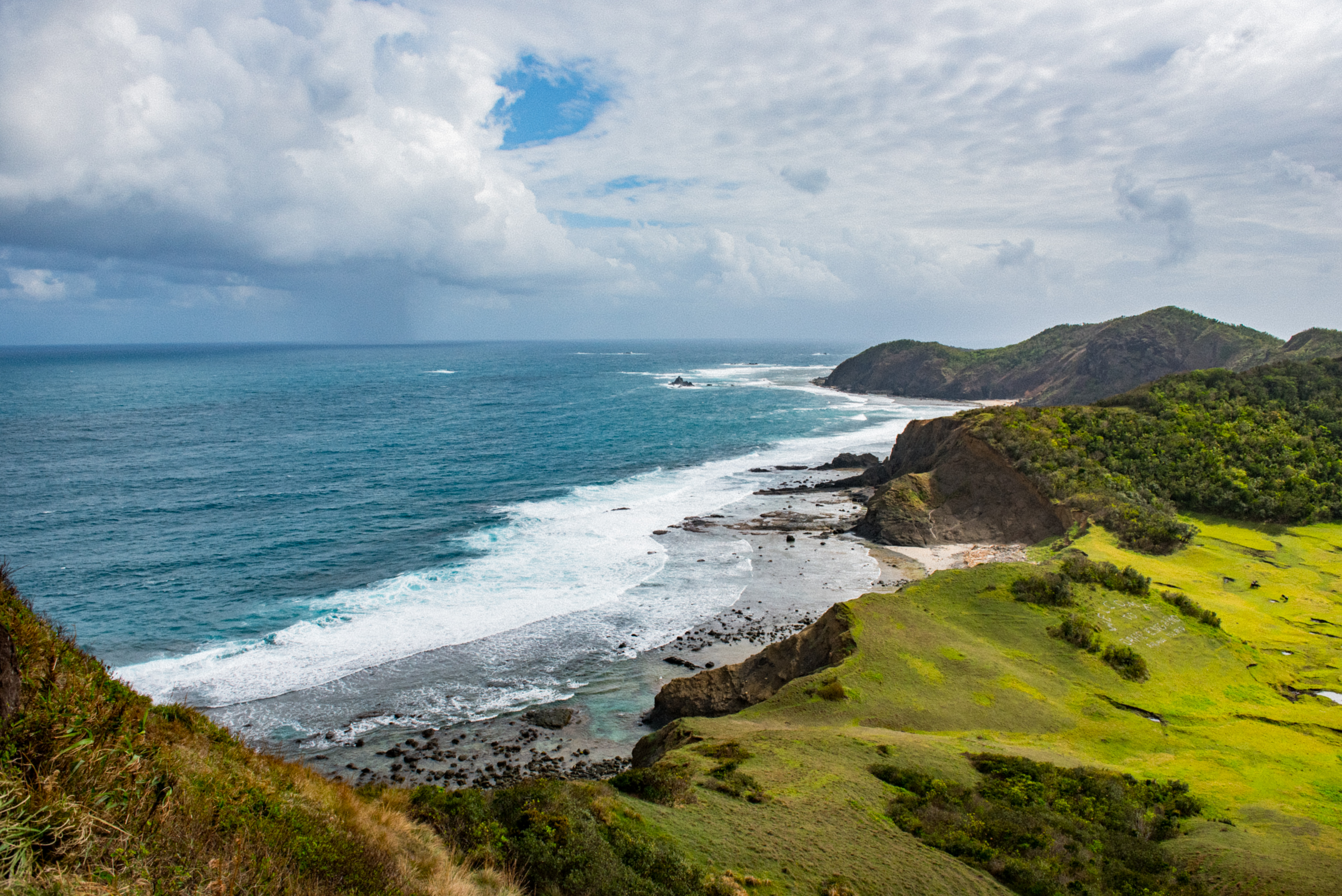
The season filmed in Palaui Island in Cagayan.

The players were divided into two tribes of ten: Galang, composed of returning players, and Tadhana, the returning players’ loved ones. Tadhana lost the first four consecutive challenges, and was initially dominated by a men's alliance led by Brad. Brad's decision to blindside his ally John resulted in Brad's subsequent elimination and the end of the men's alliance. When Galang first went to Tribal Council, Aras spearheaded the elimination of Laura M. in hopes that she could eliminate Brad in a Redemption Island challenge to ensure the loyalty of Brad's wife, Monica. The plan was successful, and Laura M. returned to the game at the merge.

The tribes merged with 11 players remaining, including three pairs of loved ones: Aras and Vytas, Tina and Katie, and Laura M. and Ciera. The five players without loved ones remaining in the game formed an alliance led by Tyson, and were able to recruit Laura M. and Ciera to send Aras, Vytas, and Tina to Redemption Island before betraying Laura M. for being the stronger member of the final intact pair. With no pairs remaining, the new players outnumbered the returnees four to three, but the new players’ attempt to seize control was foiled by Ciera, who sided with the returnees. However, with six players left, she changed allegiances, forcing a tie which was resolved through random draw, resulting in Katie's elimination. This allowed the returning players alliance of Tyson, Monica, and Gervase to take control, voting out the others and making it to the end of the game.

At the Final Tribal Council, Gervase was berated by the jury for his perceived rudeness and hiding behind more dominant players, while Monica was castigated for threatening to flip to the other alliance but ultimately never following through. This led the jury to award Tyson the title of Sole Survivor, receiving seven of the eight votes to win, and Monica receiving one.

Challenge winners and eliminations by episode
Episode			Redemption Island		Challenge winner(s)		Voted out	
No.	Title	Original air date	Winner(s)	Eliminated	Reward	Immunity	Tribe	Player
1	"Blood Is Thicker Than Anything"	September 18, 2013	None		None		Tadhana	~~Laura B.~~ (Note: After Laura B. and Candice were sent to Redemption Island, Rupert chose to take Laura's place. As a result, Laura B. remained in the game, albeit taking Rupert's place on Galang (the returning players' tribe).)
1	"Blood Is Thicker Than Anything"	September 18, 2013	None		None		Galang	Candice
1	"Blood Is Thicker Than Anything"	September 18, 2013	None		None		Galang	Rupert
1	"Blood Is Thicker Than Anything"	September 18, 2013	None		Galang		Tadhana	Marissa
2	"Rule In Chaos"	September 25, 2013	Candice	Rupert	Galang		Tadhana	Rachel
2	"Rule In Chaos"	September 25, 2013	Marissa	Rupert	Galang		Tadhana	Rachel
3	"Opening Pandora's Box"	October 2, 2013	Candice	Rachel	Galang		Galang	Colton
3	"Opening Pandora's Box"	October 2, 2013	Marissa	Rachel	Galang		Tadhana	John
4	"One Armed Dude and Three Moms"	October 9, 2013	John	Marissa	Galang		Tadhana	Brad
4	"One Armed Dude and Three Moms"	October 9, 2013	Candice	Marissa	Galang		Tadhana	Brad
5	"The Dead Can Still Talk"	October 16, 2013	John	Candice	Tadhana		Galang	Laura M.
5	"The Dead Can Still Talk"	October 16, 2013	Brad	Candice	Tadhana		Galang	Laura M.
6	"One-Man Wrecking Ball"	October 23, 2013	Laura M.	Brad	Tadhana		Galang	Kat
6	"One-Man Wrecking Ball"	October 23, 2013	John	Brad	Tadhana		Galang	Kat
7	"Swoop In For The Kill"	October 30, 2013	John	Kat	Tadhana		Galang	Laura B.
7	"Swoop In For The Kill"	October 30, 2013	Laura M.	Kat	Tadhana		Galang	Laura B.
8	"Skin of My Teeth"	November 6, 2013	Laura M. (Note: Returned to game upon winning the Redemption duel.)	John	None	Vytas	Kasama	Aras
8	"Skin of My Teeth"	November 6, 2013	Laura M.	Laura B.	None	Vytas	Kasama	Aras
9	"My Brother's Keeper"	November 13, 2013	None		None	Monica	Kasama	Vytas
9	"My Brother's Keeper"	November 13, 2013	None		None	Katie	Kasama	Tina
10	"Big Bad Wolf"	November 20, 2013	Vytas	Aras	~~Monica~~ (Caleb, Ciera, Gervase, Hayden, Katie, Laura M., Tyson) (Note: Monica chose to give her reward to the rest of the tribe while keeping immunity.)	Monica	Kasama	Laura M.
10	"Big Bad Wolf"	November 20, 2013	Tina	Aras	~~Monica~~ (Caleb, Ciera, Gervase, Hayden, Katie, Laura M., Tyson)	Monica	Kasama	Laura M.
11	"Gloves Come Off"	November 27, 2013	Laura M.	Vytas	None	Monica	Kasama	Caleb
11	"Gloves Come Off"	November 27, 2013	Tina	Vytas	None	Monica	Kasama	Caleb
12	"Rustle Feathers"	December 4, 2013	Laura M.	Caleb	Gervase [Monica, Tyson]		Kasama	Katie
12	"Rustle Feathers"	December 4, 2013	Tina	Caleb	Gervase [Monica, Tyson]		Kasama	Katie
13	"Out On a Limb"	December 11, 2013	Laura M.	Katie	Ciera [Hayden]		Kasama	Hayden
13	"Out On a Limb"	December 11, 2013	Tina	Katie	Ciera [Hayden]		Kasama	Hayden
14	"It's My Night"	December 15, 2013	Tina	Hayden	None	Tyson	Kasama	Ciera
14	"It's My Night"	December 15, 2013	Tina	Laura M.	None	Tyson	Kasama	Ciera
14	"It's My Night"	December 15, 2013			None	Tyson	Kasama	Tina
15	"Reunion"	December 15, 2013						

In the case of the immunity and reward winner being able to share their reward with others, the invitees are in brackets.

== Episodes ==
No. overall	No. in season	Title	CBS recap	Rating/share (household)	Rating/share (18-49)	Original release date	U.S. viewers (millions)	Weekly rank
397	1	"Blood Is Thicker Than Anything"	Recap	5.9/10	2.6/8	September 18, 2013	9.73	#12
The ten pairs of returning players and their loved ones were dropped off in ten separate locations as part of the Day Zero twist to spend the night together without a tribe. The next morning, Jeff Probst welcomed the 20 castaways to the game and announced that they would not be playing the game with their loved ones, but against them. The castaways split into their tribes and Jeff sprung a second twist on them that they would immediately vote out a member of their tribe. Tadhana voted out Laura B., while Galang voted out Candice. Jeff then announced that Redemption Island was back in play, but with a twist that the loved one of the castaway could switch places with them. Rupert immediately stepped forward to take his wife Laura's place and she joined his tribe, Galang. After discussing it between themselves, John did not switch with his wife, Candice. At their new campsite, Brad arranged an all-male alliance at Tadhana.: Reward/Immunity Challenge: Six castaways from each tribe would race out into the ocean and over a set of three obstacles to a boat. They would then dive down to untie knots to free the boat. The castaways would paddle the boat back to shore and deliver a chest with three bags of puzzle pieces. The other three members of the tribe would then assemble the puzzle pieces into a ship's wheel which would be used to raise a flag. The first tribe to raise their flag would win immunity and a reward of flint.; Gervase struggled with the swimming part of the challenge, requiring assistance from Aras, which gave Tadhana a huge lead at the end of the boat stage of the challenge. The lead was squandered during the puzzle stage as Laura M., Monica, and Tina worked efficiently to solve the puzzle to give Galang the win. Gervase's excessive celebration at the win did not go over well with Tadhana and that put a target on his niece, Marissa, despite her comments against her uncle's actions. The boys’ alliance knew from day one that they wanted to vote out one of the women and was trying to decide between Katie, who was seen as ineffective at the puzzle stage of the challenge, and Marissa, who was guilty by association for Gervase's excessive celebration. In the end, the boy's alliance went with Marissa and she was sent to Redemption Island in a unanimous vote.
398	2	"Rule In Chaos"	Recap	5.8/10	2.4/7	September 25, 2013	9.54	#24
At Galang, Colton was unhappy that the tribe didn't want to talk strategy and seemingly not playing the game, so he tried to stir up trouble by telling various castaways that others were targeting them. However, the tribe saw through his attempts at stirring up trouble and wanted the camp to remain drama free. Aras, Gervase, Monica, Tina, and Tyson formed an alliance. Over at Tadhana, Rachel tried to secure her position among the men's alliance while Ciera tried to swing the vote to Rachel by suggesting to others that she had an alliance with John.: Redemption Island Challenge: The castaways would use a long pole to maneuver a wooden spool through a metal rod structure. They would then balance the spool on the top of the structure. The structure is mounted on a spring, so the structure would sway if the castaway touches the structure while maneuvering the spool, possibly toppling the spools from the top of the structure. The first two castaways to stack ten spools on top would remain in the game.; Jeff announced that the first finisher would be able to give a clue to the Hidden Immunity Idol to any castaway of their choice. Candice and Rupert were close to finishing the duel when Rupert's stack toppled over. Candice cruised to finishing first, while Rupert was unable to recover, allowing Marissa to continue on. Candice gave the clue to Hidden Immunity Idol to John. Back at camp, Vytas suggested to his alliance that they vote out Rachel in order to tempt Tyson into taking her place and weakening Galang in the process. John didn't want to vote out Rachel as if Tyson did switch at the duel, it would mean more competition to Candice.: Reward/Immunity Challenge: Three castaways would roll a fourth castaways in a barrel to four platforms to retrieve four bags of balls. Once all of the bags were retrieved, the remaining castaways would roll the balls up a ramp and into six targets. The first tribe to have a ball in all six targets would win immunity and a reward of fishing gear.; The challenge was closely fought with Galang edging out Tadhana. The next day, the guys went with Vytas' suggestion and sent Rachel to Redemption Island.
399	3	"Opening Pandora's Box"	Recap	6.3/10	2.7/8	October 2, 2013	10.16	#21
At Galang, Colton was still upset that the other players were not strategizing with him. When the tribes got to Redemption Island, Tyson saw through Tadhana's idea of weakening Galang by voting out Rachel so he could switch places with her. However, the couple agreed not to switch. Tyson then called out Brad for voting out Rachel, who fired back at the whole Galang tribe and stated that it was hard to vote out their fellow tribe members. But Brad was immediately rebuffed by Marissa, who said that Tadhana had voted out the two strongest women when they had the opportunity to vote out the weaker members of their tribe, making more sense and causing less tension. Brad told her that this was part of the game, but Marissa responded by cursing at him. Suddenly, Colton began to break down crying and told everybody that he wanted to quit. Jeff lambasted Colton for quitting, and even claimed that Colton faked appendicitis during Survivor: One World, making him a two-time quitter. Colton denied this and then departed the game, taking his buff with him.: Redemption Island Challenge: The three castaways would stack wooden blocks like a line of domino tiles while avoiding bars that would topple the tiles that were already stacked. Once all of the blocks were properly stacked, the castaway would start a chain reaction which would release a ball that would smash a plate. The first two castaways to break their plates would remain in the game.; Candice took first place for the second time, while Marissa barely edged out Rachel after over 45 minutes of work. Candice gave John the second clue to the Hidden Immunity Idol.: Reward/Immunity Challenge: Facing off one-on-one, the castaways would battle sumo style using padded bags to try to knock their opponent off a platform and into the ocean to score a point for their tribe. The first tribe to five points would win immunity and a reward of a Tarp, pillows, blankets, mosquito net, rope, and a hammock. Tribe could also opt to win fishing gear instead.; During his match-up with Hayden, Tyson popped his right shoulder out. The Survivor Medical Team cleared him to remain in the game but advised he sit out the remainder of the challenge. Laura M. defeated Ciera in the final round to give Galang their third straight win. Back at camp, John lobbied to vote out Ciera as she didn't do as much work around camp as Katie. After John walked away, Brad proposed that they vote out John as Brad was worried that if Candice continued to win at Redemption Island, Brad would lose his control over John when Candice returned to the game. Brad organized the others to vote for John, but said that he didn't want to vote for John himself. Vytas and Hayden saw through Brad trying to get the tribe to do his dirty work and considered blindsiding Brad instead. However, at Tribal Council, they stuck to voting for John and he was voted out.
400	4	"One Armed Dude and Three Moms"	Recap	5.9/10	2.5/7	October 9, 2013	9.60	#19
When the castaways arrived at the Redemption Island duel, there was still a lot of anger towards Brad with Candice flipping the bird at him. Candice, John, Brad, and Monica argued about who was responsible for the castaways being sent to Redemption Island.: Redemption Island Challenge: The castaways would maneuver a buoy along a rope twisted around a horizontal ladder. At the end of the rope, the castaway would untie a key from the buoy and use the key to unlock a bag of puzzle pieces. The first two castaways to solve their puzzle would remain in the game.; John came in first followed by Candice after Marissa faltered at the puzzle. At Candice's suggestion, John gave Monica the clue to the location of the Hidden Immunity Idol. However, at Brad's urging, Monica burned the clue in the ceremonial buff burning urn without looking at it. Back at the Tadhana camp, Brad started to feel the heat from his tribe members about continually voting out their loved ones, so he decided that Caleb should be the next to go since Colton had already quit the game. Caleb, Hayden, and Vytas agreed to vote off one of the girls, but were wary of being "Johnned" by Brad. They wanted to keep Brad into the merge as that would take the heat off them. Over at Galang, Gervase and Tyson formed an alliance since their loved ones were now out of the game.: Reward/Immunity Challenge: The castaways would paddle out into the ocean to retrieve five crates tied to the bottom of the ocean. Once all five crates were returned to the beach, the castaways would use the crates to build a staircase. Two castaways would then solve a puzzle revealing the combination on a wheel that would lead them to a key. The key would unlock a handle to raise a flag. The first tribe to raise their flag would win immunity and a reward of tea, coffee, croissants, and biscotti. Tribe could also opt to win fishing gear.; Tadhana again got off to an early lead, but lost when Laura M. again beat out her daughter Ciera during the puzzle stage. When Tadhana returned to camp, the men went off to strategize over whom to vote out. However, Brad lingered around camp and told the girls that he was going to vote for Caleb. Brad then joined the rest of the guys, but his slowness in joining them made the men suspicious of a plot by Brad. After some discussion, Brad agreed to vote for Ciera. At Tribal Council, after Brad admitted that it would be easy to vote out somebody without a loved one on the other tribe, Caleb announced that he would be voting for Brad and that other men on his tribe could vote for whomever they wanted. Brad said that he would not vote for Caleb. After all votes were read, Brad and Ciera had each received 3 votes. On the revote, in which Brad and Ciera were ineligible to participate, Vytas changed his vote to Brad, sending him to Redemption Island.
401	5	"The Dead Can Still Talk"	Recap	6.0/10	2.6/8	October 16, 2013	10.11	#18
Over at Tadhana, everybody in the tribe tried to figure out where Caleb stood after the surprise shift in power from the last Tribal Council. When the tribes got to Redemption Island, Monica asked Brad to let her take his place, but he refused.: Redemption Island Challenge: The castaways would disassemble a crate and use the pieces to build a bridge. Once the bridge was complete, they would disassemble the bridge and use some of the pieces to solve a puzzle. The first two castaways to solve their puzzle would remain in the game.; John took first place and Brad edged out Candice. John gave the clue to the Hidden Immunity Idol to Monica, but she again burned it in the ceremonial buff burning urn.: Reward/Immunity Challenge: The castaways would face off one against one and slide down a water slide to retrieve a ring. They would then toss the ring onto a post to score a point for their tribe. The first tribe to score five points would win immunity and a reward of steaks, vegetables, spices, and a wok. Tribe could also opt to win fishing gear.; Tadhana got their first win. Back at camp, the alliance of Aras, Gervase, Monica, Tina, and Tyson were set to vote out Laura B. until Aras suggested that they pass on the easy vote and instead vote for Laura M. Aras thought that by voting out Laura M., she could defeat Brad at the Redemption Island duels and secure Monica's future loyalty in the game. At Tribal Council, the alliance went with Aras' plan and Laura M. was voted out.
402	6	"One-Man Wrecking Ball"	Recap	5.8/9	2.4/7	October 23, 2013	9.52	#22
At Galang, Tyson and Gervase discussed how long they would wait until they took out Aras as they were concerned that Aras and Vytas would dominate the game after a tribal merger.: Redemption Island Challenge: The castaways would race along a balance beam to collect four bags containing 100 numbered puzzle pieces. After a bag was collected, they would lay out the pieces in numerical order and then retrieve the next bag. The first two castaways to have all 100 pieces correctly placed would remain in the game.; Laura M. cruised to first place while second place was narrowly taken by John over Brad. Laura M. gave the clue to the Hidden Immunity Idol to Vytas, but he immediately burned the clue. After Laura M. and John left the Redemption Island Arena, Jeff announced that there would be a tribal switch and that they would draw buffs for new tribes. The new Galang became Kat, Katie, Laura B., Monica, Tina, and Vytas while the new Tadhana became Aras, Caleb, Ciera, Gervase, Hayden, and Tyson.: Reward/Immunity Challenge: Working two at a time, the tribe would race out to a cage on the bottom of the ocean, untie knots to release a gate, and retrieve a fish trap. Once three traps were retrieved, two castaways would use puzzle pieces contained in the traps to assemble a puzzle. The first tribe to assemble their puzzle would win immunity and a reward of fixings for a picnic: bread, ham, roast beef, cheese, condiments, and brownies.; Laura B. and Tina nearly threw away the challenge when they failed to remember to bring back the first fish trap. Tina nearly redeemed herself when she and Monica made up a lot of ground during the puzzle stage, going so far as thinking they had completed the puzzle twice, but Tadhana persevered and took the win. Back at camp, the women agreed to vote out Vytas, but Kat became irritated at Monica talking strategy too much and approached Tina about voting out Monica instead. Tina became concerned about Kat's loyalty and told Monica and Vytas about Kat's suggestion. Monica confronted Kat about it, but Kat denied everything. At Tribal Council, Kat pleaded for the tribe to keep her in the game and continued to deny that she suggested Monica be voted out. Vytas took the opportunity to deflect the vote away from him by pointing out that he was open and honest with the tribe while Kat was not. When the vote came, the women decided to eliminate Kat and she was sent to Redemption Island.
403	7	"Swoop In For The Kill"	Recap	5.6/9	2.3/7	October 30, 2013	9.00	#25
At the Redemption Island duel, Kat broke down after she entered the arena. Hayden said that his relationship with Kat was more important than the game. Jeff told him to prove it by putting him on the spot to switch with Kat. After Kat told Hayden that he had a better chance of winning the game, they did not switch.: Redemption Island Challenge: The castaways would untie a series of knots to release a machete. They would then use the machete to cut a rope which would release a bag of puzzle pieces. The pieces would then have to be assembled into a puzzle the shape of a flame. The first two castaways to solve their puzzle would remain in the game.; John cruised to victory, while Laura M. beat out Kat to take second place. John gave the clue to the Hidden Immunity Idol to Monica who continued the practice of burning it. At the Tadhana camp while Aras was away, Tyson organized the ouster of Aras, perceiving him as a threat, and the group of Caleb, Ciera, Gervase, Hayden, and Tyson agreed to go to the final five together.: Reward/Immunity Challenge: Four castaways would be chained together by their ankles and have to navigate through an obstacle course to collect bags of balls and chains. Once all the bags were collected, one castaway would assemble the balls and chains into bolas to be used in a game of ladder toss. The first castaway to get three of their bolas onto the ladder would win immunity and a reward of fried chicken, biscuits, corn on the cob, macaroni and cheese, iced tea, and lemonade.; The challenge was a close competition with the tribes tied throughout the challenge until Tyson edged out Tina during the ladder toss stage to give Tadhana their third straight victory. Back at the Galang camp, Laura B. took it upon herself to tell Vytas that he was going to be voted out next as she thought it would be the honorable thing to do. However, the other women did not look kindly upon Laura B. speaking for the girls alliance without consulting them first. Monica felt that she couldn't trust Laura B. while Tina was concerned about Laura B.'s unpredictability. At Tribal Council, the tribe debated voting out Vytas or Laura B. When the vote came, the women turned against Laura B. and she was voted out.
404	8	"Skin of My Teeth"	Recap	5.5/9	2.5/7	November 6, 2013	9.29	#21
After returning to camp from Tribal Council, Monica was not happy about being told by Tina that she was fifth in line among an alliance of Tina, Katie, Aras, Vytas, and Gervase.: Redemption Island Challenge: The castaways would hang onto a pole as long as they can. The last castaway left hanging without touching the ground would return to the game.; John slid off the pole first followed by Laura B. With the win, Laura M. returned to the game and Jeff announced the tribal merger. Jeff gave the clue to the Hidden Immunity Idol to Laura M. and she promptly burned it. Back at camp, Ciera told her mother about the individuals alliance she struck with the castaways who had their loved ones leave the game. Tyson found the Hidden Immunity Idol using the clues that Hayden told him when the tribes switched. Aras and Vytas talked and thought their alliance with Tina, Katie, Monica, Gervase, and Tyson was strong and that they should vote out Laura M. or Ciera next. Meanwhile, Monica talked to Tyson and he told her about the individuals alliance's plan to take out Aras and Vytas due to their threat level and strong ties with Tina and Katie.: Immunity Challenge: Jeff would display a series of symbols to the castaways; they would then have to recreate the sequence from memory. If a castaway chose an incorrect symbol, they would be out of the challenge. The last castaway remaining would win immunity.; Vytas narrowly beat his brother to take the first individual immunity. Aras got his alliance to agree to split the vote between Laura M. and Ciera in case there was a Hidden Immunity Idol in play. At Tribal Council, the castaways discussed shifting alliances among the individuals and the blood pairs. When the vote came, the individuals alliance revealed itself; joined by Laura M. and Ciera, they voted Aras out.
405	9	"My Brother's Keeper"	Recap	6.0/9	2.5/7	November 13, 2013	9.87	#20
When the castaways returned from Tribal Council, Tina called out Monica and Tyson for the blindside against her alliance with Aras, but several of the tribe members defended themselves by telling Tina that Aras also had several alliances.: Immunity Challenge: The castaways would participate in the classic Survivor food eating challenge. In the first round, six castaways would move on after eating 40 mealworms. In the second round, two castaways would move on after eating 3 ounces (85 g) of pig intestines. In the last round, the two castaways would eat two grubs. The first castaway to finish their grubs would win immunity.; In the final round of the challenge, Monica took on Gervase, who faced the same food (grubs) he was unable to eat in Survivor: Borneo. While he tried to finish the challenge this time, history repeated itself and Monica was victorious. The alliance of seven decided to split the vote 4–3, with the four men voting for Vytas and the three women voting for Katie, to guard against the Hidden Immunity Idol. Tyson, who had the Hidden Immunity Idol, did not tell his alliance that the split was unnecessary as he did not want to put a target on himself. Vytas tried to scramble and get the vote to be 4–3 between Katie and himself. At Tribal Council, Vytas and Monica argued about Monica's status in the game. This upset Monica and she changed her vote to Vytas, but he already had the majority of votes and was sent to Redemption Island by a vote of 8–1–1. Monica's anger-fuelled vote against Vytas did not go over well with Gervase and he thought she should stick to the agreed upon plan.: Immunity Challenge: The castaways would balance the tip of a sword on a shield. Then would then stack coins on top of the sword's handle. The last castaway to keep their stack of coins balanced would win immunity.; Katie won the challenge, so Tina ran off trying to find the Hidden Immunity Idol, knowing that she was sure to be voted out, but not knowing that Tyson already had it. With Tyson still keeping his Idol discovery a secret, the alliance of seven had to trail Tina to make sure she didn't find the Idol. Gervase and Tyson became concerned that Monica was being too paranoid about being voted out and was a loose cannon. At Tribal Council, Tina pointed out to Monica that she was on the bottom of the alliance hoping that the alliance of seven would blindside Monica. Tina also tried to bluff that she had the Hidden Immunity Idol. When the votes were counted, the alliance of seven sent Tina to Redemption Island.
406	10	"Big Bad Wolf"	Recap	5.9/9	2.5/7	November 20, 2013	10.18	#20
When the tribe returned to camp after Tribal Council, Ciera told her mom, Laura M., that Katie or Monica had to go next, but Ciera was also willing to vote out her mother if it furthered her own chances in the game.: Redemption Island Challenge: The castaways would use a grappling hook to retrieve three bags with a ball inside. They would then use one of the balls to complete a labyrinth maze. The first two castaways to complete the labyrinth would remain in the game.; Tina had a huge lead after collecting all three bags in four throws of the grappling hook, but her ball fell into a hole near the end of the labyrinth maze, allowing Vytas to take the win. Tina recovered from the delay to take second place over Aras, who became the first member of the jury. Vytas gave the clue to the Hidden Immunity Idol to Katie, who did not burn it like past recipients. The clue lead Katie to the spot of the Idol, but she did not know that Tyson already had it. Tyson told Caleb and Hayden that the guys should vote for Laura M. without telling Ciera so that Ciera would be spared from voting for her mom. Ciera told her mom that she had a better chance at winning the game and it may be necessary to vote her own mom out if the number of castaways got down to six. Laura M. was not happy about the idea of being voted out from an individual player's point of view, but she was proud that Ciera was growing and showing her strength of character.: Reward/Immunity Challenge: The castaways would stand on small platforms and hang on to a rope while leaning backwards over the ocean. The rope would have knots tied along its length. After a while, the castaways would have to move further down the rope to the next knot, increasing the angle at which they were hanging over the water. The last castaway to hang onto the rope would win immunity and a reward of hamburgers, cheeseburgers, hot dogs, french fries, and soda.; Monica defeated Tyson to take her second individual immunity. When Jeff told her that she could invite one person to share the reward, Monica instead told Jeff that the Individual Immunity was more important to her than the reward and that she would like to give the reward to the rest of the tribe and forgo her share. Jeff agreed to the deal. After Tyson told Ciera that the guys were voting for Laura M. and she agreed that she could vote for her mom, Ciera started to make moves to keep her mom in the game. She figured out from Katie that she did not have the Hidden Immunity Idol and tried to persuade her alliance to vote out Katie. This caused Tyson to be concerned that Ciera was becoming a stronger player and that the alliance had to stick with the plan to vote out Laura M. At Tribal Council, the alliance (including Ciera) did stick with the original plan and Laura M. was sent back to Redemption Island.
407	11	"Gloves Come Off"	Recap	5.1/9	2.2/7	November 27, 2013	8.81	#22
Redemption Island Challenge: The castaways would bounce four blocks along a rope tunnel to retrieve them. The blocks would then need to be stacked so that one color didn't show more than once on each column. The first two castaways to solve their puzzle would remain in the game.; Laura M. and Vytas got out to a big lead over Tina during the block retrieval stage. Laura M. finished her puzzle first and then proceeded to help Tina finish her puzzle while trying to prevent Vytas from finishing his. With Laura M.'s prompting, Tina finished just seconds ahead of Vytas and he went to join his brother on the jury. Laura M. gave the clue to the Hidden Immunity Idol to Ciera and she resumed the practice of burning the clue. Tyson began rounding up votes against Katie, but Hayden and Caleb had a different idea and wanted to blindside Tyson. Hayden and Caleb told Katie about their plan and she agreed as it would keep her in the game. When Hayden and Caleb told Ciera about their plan, she agreed to vote with them. However, she didn't trust them and immediately told Tyson about their plans. She told Tyson that all of her remaining votes would be for whomever Tyson told her to vote for. Tyson told her that they would vote for Caleb and filled Gervase in on the plan.: Immunity Challenge: The castaways would hold on to a metal rod to which one end of a rope is spooled around. The other end of the rope is attached to a bucket overhead, weighted down with 25% of the castaway's body weight. The castaways would try to hold on to the rod and stop it from spinning, which would unspool the rope. The last castaway to prevent the rope from unspooling and letting the bucket hit the ground would win immunity.; Jeff gave the castaways the option of sitting out the challenge and eating a feast of steak, chicken, sausage, bread and drinks. Ciera, Gervase, and Tyson chose to eat. Monica defeated Hayden for her third individual immunity. Concerned that Ciera had flipped on them, Hayden and Caleb approached Tyson to ask him if he was going to blindside them. Hayden and Caleb said that Ciera was playing both sides and trying to get the four men against each other. They told Tyson that they should vote for Ciera. Tyson thought their story was believable, but wasn't sure he could trust them. Tyson told Gervase about Hayden and Caleb's story and he was not sure whom to trust either. At Tribal Council, Tyson played his Hidden Immunity Idol, but no votes were cast against him. When the votes were read, Tyson and Gervase decided to trust Ciera, and Caleb was sent to Redemption Island.
408	12	"Rustle Feathers"	Recap	6.2/10	2.6/8	December 4, 2013	10.63	#12
Upon returning to camp after Tribal Council, Hayden told the tribe that everybody would come in second behind Tyson at the end of the game. The alliance of Ciera, Gervase, Monica, and Tyson agreed to vote out Hayden next.: Redemption Island Challenge: The castaways would use 150 wooden tiles to construct a house of cards. The first two castaways to either construct a tower 8 feet (2.4 m) tall or have the tallest tower after 30 minutes would remain in the game.; Laura M. completed her house of cards first. Caleb was leading Tina as time was expiring, but with seconds left to go, his tower collapsed and Tina, who had been struggling, took a knee to ensure that her stack would not fall from a winning position. As a result, Caleb became the third member of the jury. Laura M. gave the clue to the Hidden Immunity Idol to Ciera, who shared it with her alliance. Everybody went looking for the Idol, but Tyson found it and kept the discovery to himself again. Hayden talked to Gervase about blindsiding Tyson. Gervase told Hayden that he would only go along with it if Ciera agreed to vote Tyson.: Reward/Immunity Challenge: While balancing a ball on top of a pole, the castaways would run a three stage obstacle course. At the end of the first and second stages, the castaways would attach a segment to the pole making the pole longer and more difficult to balance. At end of the obstacle course, the castaways would release a key to a box of sandbags. They would then use the sandbags to knock over nine bamboo targets. The first castaway to knock over all their targets would win immunity and a reward of ice cream and root beer.; Gervase edged out Monica in a close competition. Jeff told Gervase to pick one castaway to join him in the reward and he picked Monica to return the favour as Monica previously gave up her reward to the whole tribe. Jeff told him to pick another, and after some indecision, selected Tyson. Seeing the snubbing of Ciera as a possible opening, Hayden talked to her about blindsiding Tyson, but she refused to break from her alliance. At Tribal Council, Hayden used Monica's and Gervase's slip-up about Ciera being fourth in the alliance to try to convince Ciera to vote for Monica and that if she joined him and Katie, Ciera would be in the final 3. Ciera argued that her alliance had always had her back while Hayden and Katie had both previously voted for her. When the vote came, Ciera decided to break from her alliance, forcing a 3–3 tie between Hayden and Monica. Jeff called for a revote and the vote was tied again. Jeff told Ciera, Gervase, Katie, and Tyson that they must unanimously agree to vote out Hayden or Monica or they would draw rocks. Ciera explained to her alliance that she voted for Monica because she felt she was fourth in the alliance and, unless Tyson and Gervase would join her vote, she would draw rocks. When nobody budged from their position, Ciera, Katie, and Tyson drew rocks to break the stalemate. Katie drew the white rock and she was sent to Redemption Island.
409	13	"Out On a Limb"	Recap	6.0/10	2.5/8	December 11, 2013	9.92	#16
Upon returning from Tribal Council, Tyson, tired of Monica over-strategizing, revealed to Monica and Gervase that he again had found the Hidden Immunity Idol and, thus, they did not have to worry about the next vote.: Redemption Island Challenge: The three Redemption Island inhabitants would use rope to tie together sticks in order to make a pole to retrieve three keys. The first two castaways to retrieve all three keys and unlock three locks would remain in the game.; Laura M. cruised to victory while a hesitant Tina came in second over Katie. Laura M. gave the clue to the Hidden Immunity Idol to Ciera, which she shared with Hayden. The two went looking for it, but when they could not find it, Hayden reasoned that Tyson already had it. Ciera and Hayden agreed that the best plan of action would be to try to break Monica from her alliance with Gervase and Tyson by telling her that the two guys were just leading her on and that Tyson had her on a leash.: Reward/Immunity Challenge: Starting from a platform out in the ocean, the castaways would guide a buoy along a rope and around an obstacle. Once on shore, the castaways would untie a bag of puzzle pieces. The first castaway to solve their puzzle would win immunity and a reward of a choice from a menu of steak, lobster, pizza, or a hamburger to be delivered to camp.; Ciera came from dead last during the swimming stage to solve the puzzle first, earning her first individual immunity. At Tribal Council, Monica was the swing vote and both sides tried to convince her to join them and that the other side was lying. When the vote came, Monica stuck with her original alliance and Hayden was sent to Redemption Island.
410	14	"It's My Night"	Recap	5.8/9	2.6/7	December 15, 2013	10.19	#14
After the tribe returned from Tribal Council, Tyson tried to secure Monica's allegiance by offering her the Hidden Immunity Idol, but she told him to keep it.: Redemption Island Challenge: The castaways would balance one foot on one end of a seesaw while a vase was balanced on the other. The last castaway to keep their vase balanced on the seesaw would return to the game.; Hayden dropped his vase after 15 minutes to become the fifth member of the jury. Tina then outlasted Laura M. to rejoin the game and to send Laura M. to the jury. Tina kept the clue to the Hidden Immunity Idol. She and Ciera went looking for the idol in vain, so they turned to working on Monica to turn on her alliance.: Immunity Challenge: The castaways would pull on a rope attached to an unbalanced table to keep the table level. They would stand a wooden block on end and have to hold on to the rope to keep the block upright. They would then retrieve one of nine wooden blocks from three stations while keeping all the blocks on the table upright. Once the block was retrieved, the castaway would have to stack the block on the table and retrieve the other blocks. Should any of the blocks fall, the castaway would have to return to the table and restack the blocks. The first castaway to have all ten blocks standing for a three count would win immunity.; Tyson defeated Gervase and Monica. Back at camp, Tyson wanted Gervase and Monica to decide between themselves to vote out Ciera or Tina. The argument between them became rather heated. At Tribal Council, Ciera and Tina resumed their pitch to Monica to join them. When the vote was about to be read, Tyson gave his Hidden Immunity Idol to Gervase and he played it. The votes against Gervase was negated, but he did not need the added protection of the Idol as Monica had voted for Ciera and she was sent to the jury. Monica was furious that Tyson gave the Hidden Immunity Idol to Gervase without telling her.: Immunity Challenge: The castaways would race through an obstacle course and a water slide to retrieve six bags of puzzle pieces, two at a time. They would then use the pieces to solve a puzzle which would give them clues to solve a combination lock. The first castaway to unlock the combination lock and raise their flag would win immunity.; Tyson won individual immunity for the second time in a row. Tina told Monica that she should make a big move and vote for Gervase, forcing a fire making tie breaker, but Monica decided to stick to her original alliance and Tina became the last member of the jury. On day 39, the final three enjoyed the traditional breakfast and then headed off to the final Tribal Council. The three made their opening statements to the jury and then Jeff opened the floor to the jury to make their own statements and ask questions. Vytas told Tyson that he was not going to get his vote, that Gervase playing "old school", as noted in his opening statement, meant that he was not adapting to the game; and that he was unsure of whom he was going to vote for. After Tyson said in his opening statement that he played the game without malice, Katie asked him about the malice in his comment that she was headed to the jury after they drew rocks. Tyson said that that was his one regret in the game and apologized for it. Caleb asked Gervase about his big move in the game and Monica about revealing something about herself. Ciera asked Tyson if he viewed himself as a villain or hero, while she asked Gervase if he ever considered voting out Tyson. Laura M. asked Monica about who she was and about being vulnerable. Tina asked the three to pick one word to describe themselves, with Monica picking "generous", Gervase picking "honorable", and Tyson picking "fun-loving". Hayden asked Tyson if he had the Hidden Immunity Idol when he drew rocks and Monica about what the jury's perception of her was as he felt that nobody really knew her. Finally, Aras asked the final three about whom they felt he should vote for if not themselves and why; Monica and Gervase picked Tyson, and Tyson picked Monica.
411	15	"Reunion"	N/A	4.5/8	1.9/5	December 15, 2013	7.46	N/A
Months later, the votes of the jurors were revealed, with Gervase receiving no votes, Monica garnering one vote, which was from Vytas, and Tyson receiving the rest, earning the title of Sole Survivor in a 7–1–0 vote. The castaways discuss the season with host, Jeff Probst.

== Voting history ==
	Original tribes										Switched tribes		Merged tribe										
Episode	1				2	3		4		5	6	7	8	9		10	11	12			13	14	
Day	1			3	6	7	8	10		13	16	18	21	22	24	26	29	32			35	37	38
Tribe	Tadhana	Galang	Galang	Tadhana	Tadhana	Galang	Tadhana	Tadhana		Galang	Galang	Galang	Kasama	Kasama	Kasama	Kasama	Kasama	Kasama			Kasama	Kasama	Kasama
Eliminated	Laura B. (Note: After Laura B. and Candice were voted onto Redemption Island, Rupert elected to take Laura B.'s place. As a result, Laura B. remained in the game, taking Rupert's place on the Galang tribe.)	Candice	Rupert	Marissa	Rachel	Colton	John	Tie (Note: The first Tribal Council Vote resulted in a tie. Per the rules, a second vote was held where the castaways involved in the tie would not vote and the remaining castaways could only vote for those who tied.)	Brad	Laura M.	Kat	Laura B.	Aras	Vytas	Tina	Laura M.	Caleb	Tie	Tie (Note: After two rounds of voting, Tribal Council remained tied. Per the rules, the non-tied castaways must come to a consensus as to whom to eliminate between the tied castaways, or else one of the non-immune deliberating castaways would be eliminated by random draw.)	Katie	Hayden	Ciera	Tina
Votes	6–2–1–1 (Note: John's vote was not revealed, but it was posted on an external site that he voted for Laura B., who receive the majority of the votes. Katie's, Rachel's and Marissa's votes were not revealed on the show, but confirmed via post-show information.)	6–3–1 (Note: Gervase's vote was not revealed, but it was posted on an external site that he voted for Candice, who receive the majority of the votes.)	Swap	8–1	5–2–1	Quit (Note: No vote; Colton voluntarily quit the game.)	6–1	3–3	3–1	7–1	5–1	4–1	7–2–2	8–1–1	7–1–1	7–1	4–3	3–3	2–2	Rock Draw (Note: Due to a deadlocked tie after two rounds of voting and the non-tied contestants being unable to come up with a unanimous decision to vote out either Hayden or Monica, the non-tied and non-immune contestants—Ciera, Katie, and Tyson—drew rocks to resolve the vote; Katie picked the white rock and was therefore sent to Redemption Island.)	3–2	3–0 (Note: Tyson played a Hidden Immunity Idol on Gervase; therefore two votes against him were not counted.)	3–1
Voter	Vote																						
Tyson		Laura M.								Laura M.			Aras	Vytas	Tina	Laura M.	Caleb	Hayden	Hayden	Black rock	Hayden	Ciera	Tina
Monica		Candice								Laura M.	Kat	Laura B.	Aras	Vytas	Tina	Laura M.	Caleb	Hayden	None (Note: This player was not eligible to vote in the second round of voting.)	Immune	Hayden	Ciera	Tina
Gervase		Candice								Laura M.			Aras	Vytas	Tina	Laura M.	Caleb	Hayden	Hayden	Immune	Hayden	Ciera	Tina
Tina		Candice								Laura M.	Kat	Laura B.	Ciera	Vytas	Tyson							~~Gervase~~	Gervase
Ciera	Laura B.			Marissa	John		John	Brad	None				Aras	Katie	Tina	Laura M.	Caleb	Monica	Monica	Black rock	Gervase	~~Gervase~~	
Hayden	Laura B.			Marissa	Rachel		John	Ciera	Ciera				Aras	Vytas	Tina	Laura M.	Ciera	Monica	None	Immune	Gervase		
Katie	Marissa			Marissa	John		John	Brad	Brad		Kat	Laura B.	Ciera	Vytas	Monica	Laura M.	Ciera	Monica	Monica	White rock			
Caleb	Laura B.			Marissa	Rachel		John	Brad	Brad				Aras	Vytas	Tina	Laura M.	Ciera						
Laura M.		Candice								Laura B.			Aras	Vytas	Tina	Katie							
Vytas	Laura B.			Marissa	Rachel		John	Ciera	Brad		Kat	Laura B.	Laura M.	Tyson									
Aras		Gervase								Laura M.			Laura M.										
Laura B.	Marissa									Laura M.	Kat	Vytas											
Kat		Candice								Laura M.	Vytas												
Brad	Laura B.			Marissa	Rachel		John	Ciera	None														
John	Laura B.			Marissa	Rachel		Ciera																
Colton		Candice				Quit																	
Rachel	Katie			Marissa	Ciera																		
Marissa	Brad			Katie																			
Rupert		Laura M.	Swap																				
Candice		Laura M.																					

Jury vote
Episode	15		
Day	39		
Finalist	Tyson	Monica	Gervase
Votes	7–1–0		
Juror	Vote		
Tina	Yes		
Ciera	Yes		
Laura M.	Yes		
Hayden	Yes		
Katie	Yes		
Caleb	Yes		
Vytas		Yes	
Aras	Yes		

== Production ==
=== Filming ===
Redemption Island, a twist formerly seen in Survivor: Redemption Island and Survivor: South Pacific, was utilized after a three-season hiatus. In conjunction with the "Blood vs. Water" twist, remaining contestants were given the option to switch places with their loved one if their loved one was on Redemption Island. The game began with a twist called Day Zero, in which each of the ten pairs was marooned in a separate location, spending the night together before congregating as a full cast the following morning and dividing into two tribes. Due to this twist, this season is one of three to last longer than 39 days, after Survivor: The Australian Outback which lasted 42 days, and being followed by Survivor: San Juan del Sur, the second "Blood vs. Water" season, which also began with Day Zero. This season also marks the second occurrence of the rock-picking tiebreaker, 23 seasons after it first occurred in Survivor: Marquesas in 2002. This is also the first time in 13 seasons, since Survivor: Fiji, to not feature a fan favorite vote that would award one player with US$100,000. And this is the first time in 27 seasons not to ever feature a cast intro.

=== Casting ===
Roberta "R.C." Saint-Amour from Philippines and her father, Craig, were originally cast and traveled to Palaui Island with the other castaways, but were pulled from the game the day before filming began due to Craig having high blood pressure. They were replaced by Candice Woodcock Cody from Cook Islands and Heroes vs. Villains, and her husband John. "Troyzan" Robertson from One World was initially cast with his brother Todd, however they were cut a week before filming. Robertson would later return for Survivor: Game Changers. Jim Rice from South Pacific was asked to compete with his wife, but neither of them were able to participate.

According to interviews on Rob has a Podcast, as part of their Talking with T-Bird program, Kelly Goldsmith (Africa) and her fiancé were contacted to be part of the season. Judd Sergeant of Guatemala and his wife were also contacted to be part of this season, but his wife was not able to. Sean Rector of Marquesas was contacted as well. Marty Piombo of Nicaragua was contacted to play with either his wife or son, but he was cut. Earl Cole from Fiji was also considered. Lex van den Berghe of Africa was approached to play with his son, however, he declined as he did not want to play against a family member. It was also revealed on Talking with T-Bird that Jerri Manthey of The Australian Outback, All-Stars, and Heroes vs. Villains and her sister were contacted to be part of the season. Rodger Bingham (The Australian Outback) and his daughter were considered as contestants for this season. Cristina Coria of Cook Islands was asked to return to compete alongside an actor she was dating at the time, but she couldn't participate after just having surgery on her neck and back. Ozzy Lusth of Cook Islands, Micronesia, and South Pacific was also contacted to return, and had submitted his sister to be his loved one pair. Lusth was ultimately not cast, but he later returned on Game Changers and Survivor 50: In the Hands of Fans.

== Reception ==
The season received generally positive reception, primarily for the theme of returning players competing against their loved ones (which allowed for some less memorable returning players to introduce more memorable loved ones to the game), the gameplay of winner Tyson Apostol, and the alterations to the Redemption Island twist that made it somewhat more enjoyable than in previous seasons.

Dalton Ross of Entertainment Weekly ranked it #12 in the series, saying that "the returning contestants playing with/against their loved ones twist added new dimensions and forced players – and us – to think about the strategic elements of the game in an entirely new way." Despite him not being a fan of Redemption Island, he added that "it is undeniable that the RI element is what led to many of the intriguing strategic decisions of whom to vote out and why," and concluded that the season was "a super solid season from top to bottom and a nice change of pace."

Tom Santilli of Examiner.com, ranking it as the 9th-greatest season, particularly praised the "fine cast of 10 returning players," some of the new players whom he felt were "potential future all-stars" (including Brad Culpepper, Eastin, and Moss), and "the dominance of winner Tyson that made the season end on a strong note," while also claiming that "the Tribal Councils throughout the season were arguably the show's strongest ever, and featured an unpredictability we hadn’t experienced since earlier seasons."

In 2014, the annual poll of fansite “Survivor Oz” saw Blood vs. Water rank as the 3rd-greatest season of the series out of the first 28, only behind Survivor: Heroes vs. Villains, and Blood vs. Water’s successor, Survivor: Cagayan. In 2015, a poll by Rob Has a Podcast ranked this season 9th out of 30 with Rob Cesternino ranking this season 10th. This was updated in 2021 during Cesternino's podcast, Survivor All-Time Top 40 Rankings, ranking 14th out of 40.

In 2020, The "Purple Rock Podcast" ranked this season 16th out of 40 and praised the cast and the strategy that came from the blood vs. water concept. Later that same year, Inside Survivor ranked this season 19th out of 40 calling it "a genuinely fun and entertaining season, albeit with a predictable winner." In 2024, Nick Caruso of TVLine ranked this season 15th out of 47.
