= Survivor: Borneo =

First season of American television series

- Season 1
- Region 1 DVD slipcase cover
- Presented by: Jeff Probst
- No. of days: 39
- No. of castaways: 16
- Winner: Richard Hatch
- Runner-up: Kelly Wiglesworth
- Location: Pulau Tiga, Malaysia
- No. of episodes: 14

Release
- Original network: CBS
- Original release: May 31 – August 23, 2000

Additional information
- Filming dates: March 13 – April 20, 2000

Season chronology
- Next → The Australian Outback

Survivor: Borneo (originally known as Survivor 1, Survivor: Pulau Tiga, or simply Survivor) is the first season of the American CBS competitive reality television series Survivor. The show was filmed from March 13 through April 20, 2000, and premiered on May 31, 2000. The season started with 16 participants tasked with being left to survive in a remote area in Borneo, Malaysia, with minimal tools and supplies. Hosted by Jeff Probst, it consisted of 39 days with consecutive participants being removed by a majority vote. The series was set in the South China Sea on the remote Malaysian island of Pulau Tiga in the state of Sabah, about six miles (10 km) off the north coast of Borneo.

The contestants were initially separated into two tribes, Tagi and Pagong, which represented the names of the beaches they were on. When 10 players remained, the contestants merged into one tribe, Rattana. While Tagi and Pagong's names and makeups were picked by the producers, Rattana was named by contestants Sean Kenniff and Jenna Lewis, because of the rattan wood that was at their camp. The series was won by Richard Hatch defeating Kelly Wiglesworth in a 4–3 jury vote.

The finale of the season had an average of 51.7 million viewers, the highest of the franchise. Nielsen reported that 125 million people watched at least some part of the finale. In 2006, Hatch was sentenced to 51 months in prison after failing to declare his $1,000,000 winnings.

== Format ==
Survivor is a reality television show based on the Swedish show Expedition Robinson created by Mark Burnett and Charlie Parsons. The series follows a number of participants being isolated in a remote location, where they must provide food, fire, and shelter for themselves. Every three days, one participant is removed from the series by majority vote, with challenges being held to give a reward (ranging from living and food related prizes to a car) and immunity from being voted out from the series. The last remaining player is awarded a prize of $1,000,000.

== Contestants ==
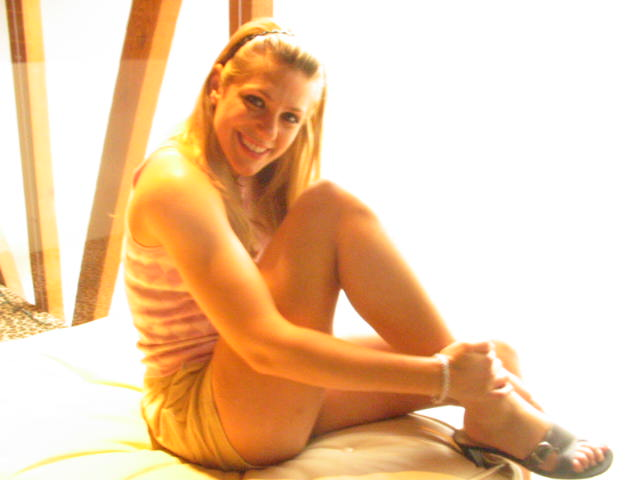
Jenna Lewis

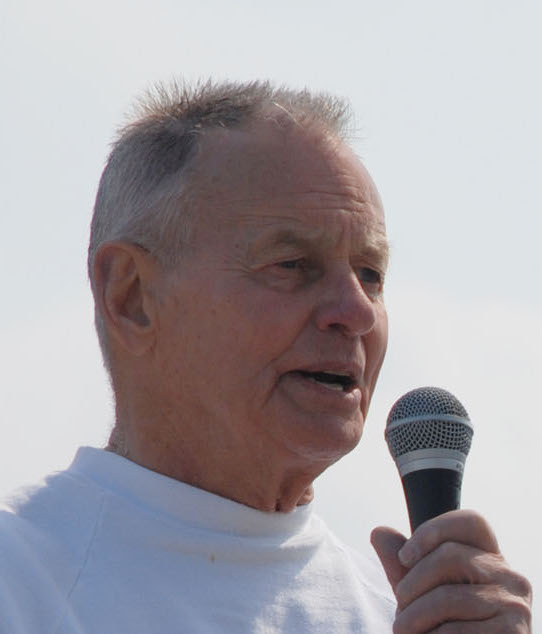
Rudy Boesch

There were 16 contestants, divided into two tribes, Pagong and Tagi. After six contestants were eliminated, the tribes were merged to form one tribe, Rattana. The final seven eliminated contestants made up the jury that decided who would be the winner. Below is a list of the participants of the series.

List of Survivor: Borneo contestants
Contestant	Age	From	Tribe		Finish	
Contestant	Age	From	Original	Merged	Placement	Day
Sonja Christopher	63	Walnut Creek, California	Tagi		1st voted out	Day 3
B.B. Andersen	64	Mission Hills, Kansas	Pagong		2nd voted out	Day 6
Stacey Stillman	27	San Francisco, California	Tagi		3rd voted out	Day 9
Ramona Gray	29	Edison, New Jersey	Pagong		4th voted out	Day 12
Dirk Been	23	Spring Green, Wisconsin	Tagi		5th voted out	Day 15
Joel Klug	27	Sherwood, Arkansas	Pagong		6th voted out	Day 18
Gretchen Cordy	38	Clarksville, Tennessee	Pagong	Rattana	7th voted out	Day 21
Greg Buis	24	Gold Hill, Colorado	Pagong	Rattana	8th voted out 1st jury member	Day 24
Jenna Lewis	22	Franklin, New Hampshire	Pagong	Rattana	9th voted out 2nd jury member	Day 27
Gervase Peterson	30	Willingboro, New Jersey	Pagong	Rattana	10th voted out 3rd jury member	Day 30
Colleen Haskell	23	Miami Beach, Florida	Pagong	Rattana	11th voted out 4th jury member	Day 33
Sean Kenniff	30	Carle Place, New York	Tagi	Rattana	12th voted out 5th jury member	Day 36
Susan Hawk	38	Palmyra, Wisconsin	Tagi	Rattana	13th voted out 6th jury member	Day 37
Rudy Boesch	72	Virginia Beach, Virginia	Tagi	Rattana	14th voted out 7th jury member	Day 38
Kelly Wiglesworth	22	Kernville, California	Tagi	Rattana	Runner-up	Day 39
Richard Hatch	39	Newport, Rhode Island	Tagi	Rattana	Sole Survivor	Day 39

=== Future appearances ===
Rudy Boesch, Richard Hatch, Susan Hawk, and Jenna Lewis returned to Survivor for Survivor: All-Stars. Gervase Peterson returned for Survivor: Blood vs. Water alongside his niece, Marissa. Kelly Wiglesworth returned for Survivor: Cambodia. Jenna Lewis (now Lewis-Dougherty) returned for Survivor 50: In the Hands of the Fans.

Outside of Survivor, Richard Hatch, Susan Hawk, Sean Kenniff, Ramona Gray, Gretchen Cordy, and Joel Klug competed on a special edition of NBC's The Weakest Link. Susan Hawk and Gervase Peterson made an appearance on Big Brother 2. Hatch competed in the 11th season of The Apprentice (known as the fourth season of The Celebrity Apprentice) and appeared on the 17th season of The Biggest Loser. In 2024, Hatch competed on the second season of House of Villains.

== Season summary ==
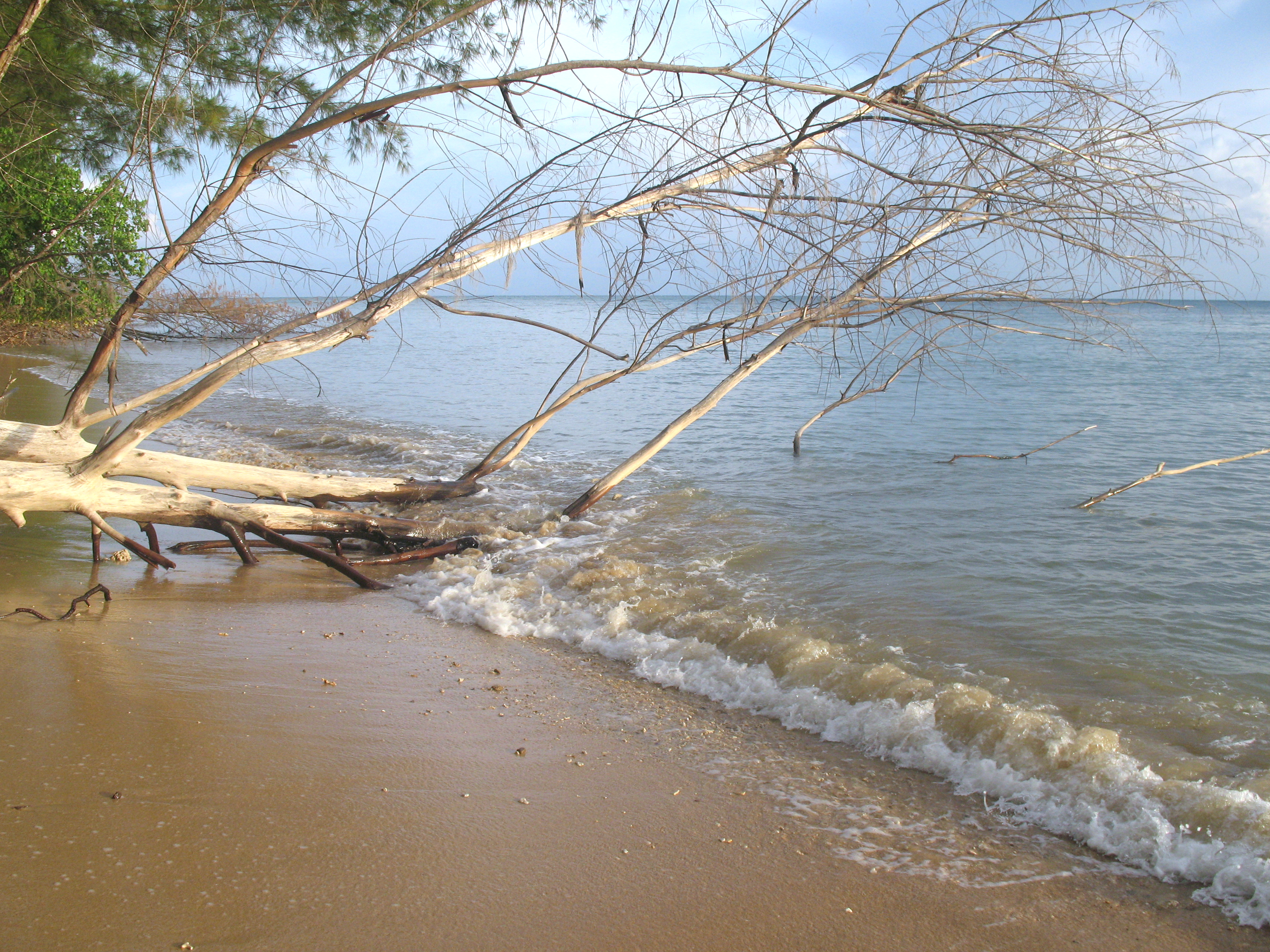
The season was filmed on the island of Pulau Tiga in Malaysia.

The contestants were divided into two tribes of eight: Tagi and Pagong. The tribes fared equally in challenges but differed in organizational structure. Pagong was dominated by the younger, more carefree members, whereas four Tagi members—Kelly, Richard, Rudy, and Susan—formed an alliance, choosing to vote as a bloc to ensure their safety. When ten players remained—five from each tribe—the tribes merged into one, Rattana. The alliance strategy proved successful, and the four took advantage of the other contestants' lack of voting strategy. There was dissension in the alliance as Kelly was deemed untrustworthy, but she won four consecutive immunity challenges and was ineligible for elimination.

When only the four alliance members remained, the vote initially ended in a draw; close allies Richard and Rudy voted for Susan, and Susan and Kelly voted for Richard. On the revote, Kelly decided to switch her vote and Susan was eliminated. After winning the final immunity challenge, Kelly decided to eliminate Rudy because she believed she had a better chance against Richard. At the final Tribal Council, Susan lambasted Kelly for switching her vote and proclaimed her support for Richard. Richard's strategic prowess and leadership were valued over Kelly's challenge performances, and the jury awarded him the title of Sole Survivor by a vote of 4–3.

Challenge winners and eliminations by episode
Episode			Challenge winner(s)		Eliminated	
No.	Title	Original air date	Reward	Immunity	Tribe	Player
1	"The Marooning"	May 31, 2000	Pagong		Tagi	Sonja
2	"The Generation Gap"	June 7, 2000	Pagong (Note: There was an unaired reward challenge in this episode. Pagong won the challenge.)	Tagi	Pagong	B.B.
3	"Quest for Food"	June 14, 2000	Tagi	Pagong	Tagi	Stacey
4	"Too Little, Too Late?"	June 21, 2000	Tagi	Tagi	Pagong	Ramona
5	"Pulling Your Own Weight"	June 28, 2000	Pagong	Pagong	Tagi	Dirk
6	"Udder Revenge"	July 5, 2000	Pagong	Tagi	Pagong	Joel
7	"The Merger"	July 12, 2000	None (Note: There was no reward challenge due to the merge.)	Greg	Rattana	Gretchen
8	"Thy Name Is Duplicity"	July 19, 2000	Greg	Gervase	Rattana	Greg
9	"Old and New Bonds"	July 26, 2000	Colleen [Jenna]	Rudy	Rattana	Jenna
10	"Crack in the Alliance"	August 2, 2000	Gervase	Richard	Rattana	Gervase
11	"Long Hard Days"	August 9, 2000	Sean [Richard]	Kelly	Rattana	Colleen
12	"Death of an Alliance"	August 16, 2000	Kelly	Kelly	Rattana	Sean
13	"The Final Four"	August 23, 2000	None	Kelly	Rattana	Susan
13	"The Final Four"	August 23, 2000	None	Kelly	Rattana	Rudy
14	"The Reunion"	August 23, 2000				

In the case of multiple tribes or castaways who win reward or immunity, they are listed in order of finish, or alphabetically where it was a team effort; where one castaway won and invited others, the invitees are in brackets.

== Episodes ==
No. overall	No. in season	Title	CBS recap	Original release date	U.S. viewers (millions)	Rating/share (18–49)
1	1	"The Marooning"	Recap	May 31, 2000	15.51	6.1/20
The two tribes paddled their way to their respective beaches on a raft with meager supplies. Upon arrival, the Pagong tribe celebrated the beginning of this journey while the Tagi tribe got right to work with Rudy taking command, aggravating some of his tribe members. Richard called for order and structure, to which Susan agreed. Ultimately, they pulled together to assemble a functional camp. At Pagong, B.B. stepped into the leadership role. He and Ramona found the tribe's watering hole, and jokingly agreed to hide it from the group. The next morning, Tagi seemed to be in good spirits as Sonja played her ukulele, though Rudy realized he might need to adapt to the personalities of his younger tribemates. B.B.'s aggressive work ethic grated on Pagong and his tribe's laziness began to frustrate him.: Reward/immunity challenge: The tribes were tasked with guiding a lit raft through shallow water. Upon reaching the shore, the competitors must carry the raft above land to the finish line. Along the way were a number of torches that must be lit with the raft's fire, culminating in a final fire bowl in front of a massive bamboo statute that must be set ablaze. The first tribe to light their final bowl won immunity and a reward of waterproof matches.; At the first immunity challenge, Tagi took the early lead by guiding its raft through the water. Sonja stumbled as they reached the shore, helping Pagong crawl ahead to light their final torch and win. As a result, Pagong received matches and immunity from that night's Tribal Council. At Tagi's camp, Richard and Rudy bonded while Sean tended to Sonja's injuries. As the first vote approached, Stacey talked of voting out Rudy for being overbearing, but at Tribal Council, a plurality of the tribe instead decided to vote out their choice of weakest link, Sonja.
2	2	"The Generation Gap"	Recap	June 7, 2000	18.10	7.5/25
Following their Tribal Council, Tagi found its fish traps still empty. Disappointed that Rudy was not voted out, Stacey suggested he was not made for the game, while Rudy believed Stacey wasn't cut out for wilderness survival. Richard revealed to his tribe that he is gay, making Dirk uncomfortable. It didn't discourage Rudy, who still saw Richard as a strong competitor. At Pagong, Ramona was dehydrated and ill while B.B. refused to quit working. Greg and Colleen began to grow close. Greg's evening game showed tribe spirits were high, though B.B. continued to annoy his tribe by washing his clothes in drinking water. At Tagi, Sean crafted a fishing pole to catch food for the group. Both tribes received tree mail, foretelling a disgusting competition. B.B. suggested Pagong throw the challenge to eliminate him, but the tribe refused.: Immunity challenge: One by one, each castaway was given an insect grub to consume. If any individual refused to eat their bug, their tribe would lose the challenge. The tiebreaker saw one member of each tribe (chosen by the opposing tribe) racing to eat two larvae, with the first player to complete the task winning immunity for their tribe.; Ultimately, despite Gervase's struggles, everyone was able to eat their assigned grub, forcing each tribe to select one person from the opposite group to eat two bugs in a tiebreaker face-off. Stacey beat Gervase and as a result, Pagong was sent to Tribal Council, where Ramona's weakness earned her two votes but B.B. received the rest and was voted out.
3	3	"Quest for Food"	Recap	June 14, 2000	23.25	9.4/29
At the Tagi tribe, Stacey still wanted to get rid of Rudy and tried to create a women's alliance to do so, but Susan didn't want to be a part of the plan. Richard proved his worth following his tribe winning the reward challenge, as he used the spear they won to catch many fish. At Pagong, Greg and Colleen found a "mud volcano" that the entire tribe was able to enjoy.: Reward challenge: Each tribe swam out to an inner tube attached to a sunken treasure chest. Once all the tribe members were at their tube, they would dive down and drag their chest to shore. The first tribe back with their chest would win fishing supplies.; Tagi won the reward challenge. Back at Pagong, everyone ate rats, including a hesitant Gervase and Ramona. At Tagi, Dirk annoyed everyone with his Bible reading.: Immunity challenge: Each tribe built a stretcher, and raced into the woods to rescue one tribe member stuck in a tree. They then had to carry that tribe member back to the beach and to the first aid tent.; Pagong won the immunity challenge. At Tribal Council, Tagi voted out Stacey.
4	4	"Too Little, Too Late?"	Recap	June 21, 2000	24.20	9.8/33
At Pagong, Ramona started to feel better after having been sick and tried to begin pulling her weight around camp, but Jenna said it might be too late for her despite the pair bonding more. After a tropical storm, Gretchen took a stand and suggested once again that they rebuild their shelter in the canopy away from the beach. Greg appeared to be providing light relief to their tribe, and Gretchen said this would likely get him further in the game. At Tagi, Sean and Dirk spent most of their time fishing, but had no luck; Sean also tried to build a bowling alley. Kelly, Susan, and Richard created an alliance.: Reward challenge: The castaways had to make a distress signal. The goal was to make the best S.O.S. signal for the plane (with Jeff in it) to see. The best signal would win the tribe hammocks, towels and pillows, plus two additional items (one chosen by each tribe; Tagi chose a flaying knife, Pagong chose a spice rack). Tagi won the challenge.; Immunity challenge: A five-part relay race: The first member swam to a buoy, dove down and retrieved a map in a bottle. The second ran across a floating bridge with the bottle to a waiting boat, where the second and third paddled to shore. The fourth member would break the bottle, check the map, and sprint into the jungle to find a rope ladder and a key. For the final leg, the two remaining tribe members had to locate a buried treasure chest and dig it up. Tagi, being the first tribe to unearth their treasure chest and bring it back to the start line and have the key inside the lock, were the winners.; At the immunity challenge, Gervase had problems on the sprint into the jungle, one of the main reasons Pagong lost to Tagi again. They proceeded to vote out Ramona. Ramona thought it was her early illness that caused her to be voted out.
5	5	"Pulling Your Own Weight"	Recap	June 28, 2000	23.98	9.6/31
At Tagi, Dirk and Sean were still trying to fish instead of helping around camp, but to no avail. Susan told them it was a waste of time if they weren't catching anything. The tribe were worried about Dirk's weight loss. At Pagong, everyone felt vulnerable because their tribe was getting smaller. Greg and Colleen grew closer, choosing to sleep out in the jungle away from the others. Greg knew he was becoming somewhat of a tribe leader, a role he didn't want.: Reward challenge: Tribes selected three tribe members to shoot for the tribe in three rounds. The first one was a blow gun, the second was a slingshot, and the third was a spear toss. The winning tribe would win fruit and chickens.; At the reward challenge, Joel helped Pagong win with his spear throwing after the first two rounds were tied. Dirk and Sean began to help around the camp but that didn't change their tribe members' minds, and they remained on the outs. The alliance of four was decided on getting one of them out at the next Tribal Council. At Pagong they decided to let their chickens lay eggs.: Immunity challenge: One person from each tribe rowed their boat around the buoys, picking up their tribe members waiting in the water. The first tribe to get all members back to shore won.; At the immunity challenge, Gervase finally led Pagong to victory and Kelly, the whitewater rafting guide, was upset that "she got beat by a guy who couldn't even swim". At Tagi's Tribal Council, the alliance of four claimed its first victim as Dirk was voted out.
6	6	"Udder Revenge"	Recap	July 5, 2000	24.50	10.6/33
Both tribes were wondering what the merge was going to be like. Tagi was afraid due to their numerical deficit, and Rudy agreed to be a part of Richard, Susan, and Kelly's alliance. At Pagong, Joel was confident because his tribe had the numbers, but Colleen thought Joel was an idiot because they weren't merging yet and still had a chance of going in even. Gervase offended the girls by telling them that they were dumber than a cow. One of Pagong's chickens was eaten by another creature. At Tagi, Richard began walking around camp naked.: Reward challenge: One at a time, each tribe member raced to a barrack. There were three different items in there (a can opener, a knife, and an Army helmet). The first tribe to get all of their items (with no duplicates) back to the start won a reward of canned foods and a chocolate bar.; At the reward challenge, Richard brought back a duplicate knife instead of a can opener and Pagong won by default. At Pagong, Joel tried to create an alliance with the group that would carry over after the merge but was shot down by the women of the tribe. The alliance was interpreted as mean-spirited on Joel's part. Joel started to get a little bossy, which annoyed the girls.: Immunity challenge: Both tribes raced through an Army obstacle course. The first two tribe members raced through the first part and met up with two more members, then had to go through a puzzle and race to the finish line.; Tagi won the immunity challenge in a very close race. With help from Greg, the women of Pagong voted out Joel.
7	7	"The Merger"	Recap	July 12, 2000	24.50	10.4/34
The day after Pagong voted Joel out, one person from each tribe went to the opposite tribe's camp and then convened to decide which camp to live on. Jenna went to Tagi and Sean went to Pagong. After a bit of time at camp, Jenna and Sean met with each other at a neutral site to decide which camp they wanted to live on and what to name the new merged tribe. They were welcomed by a feast, including lobster and wine, and got to stay the night under a canopy shelter and on beds. The next day, Jenna and Sean decided to live at the Tagi beach and named their merged tribe Rattana. The ten castaways met up and everyone celebrated, except Rudy, who was annoyed because the population doubled.: Immunity challenge: All ten castaways submerged themselves underwater to see how long they could hold their breath. The top three castaways then had another competition of releasing buoys along a ladder submerged underwater. The first castaway to release all of their buoys would win immunity.; Greg won immunity after a close battle with Sean. At Tribal Council, the disorganized Pagong tribe and Sean were completely split and voted individually, while the Tagi alliance of Kelly, Richard, Rudy, and Susan stayed together and voted out Gretchen.
8	8	"Thy Name Is Duplicity"	TBA	July 19, 2000	26.15	11.4/35
At camp, the remaining members of the former Pagong tribe felt vulnerable because the Tagi tribe had voted out their leader, Gretchen. Jenna decided her best move was to get closer to the other women, all of whom were Tagi members. She put her plan into action and seemed to sway Susan who at first thought Jenna was going to be really annoying. Richard started to worry about who voted for him at Tribal Council.: Reward challenge: Each tribe member was to shoot at an archery target with a bow and arrow. The closest mark to the bullseye won a video from home and the chance to send a video home to them.; At the reward challenge, Jeff showed everyone a sneak peek of their videos, except Jenna, because they never received a video for her. Greg went first and no one hit the mark closer, so he won the reward and saw his home video from his sister and sent one back to her. Rudy thought there might be some incestuous behavior between Greg and his sister though clearly took things the wrong way. Jenna was frustrated about losing the reward challenge and instead of watching Greg's video, continued to practice with the bow and arrow, continually hitting the target closer than Greg's mark. People began to realize that Richard liked Greg because of the way he was playing the game. Greg realized that Richard was a powerful player.: Immunity challenge: Each member was connected to a piece of rope and needed to go to the checkpoints in number order (1–6) and collect the color carabiners at each checkpoint and then cross the finish line.; Gervase won immunity. At Tribal Council, the Tagi alliance and Jenna piggy-backed off of Sean's alphabet strategy and voted out Greg.
9	9	"Old and New Bonds"	Recap	July 26, 2000	27.18	11.9/36
While Richard was catching fish, the other players began to realize that nobody voted him out because of his role as provider. Rudy didn't make the fire hot enough so the fish wasn't done when it got off the fire, and the attempt to recook it simply burnt it.: Reward challenge: A rope course with 16 legs, each leg had a medallion with the castaways number on it. The first castaway to receive all their medallions and get back to the center won a barbecue and letters from home.; At the reward challenge, Jenna wanted to win because she hadn't heard anything from her family at the last challenge. It was a race between Colleen and Kelly, which Colleen narrowly won. Jeff told her she could pick one other person and she instantly chose Jenna. After the reward challenge, it was Richard's 39th birthday and he celebrated in his "birthday suit". Richard spent his entire birthday naked, which disturbed some of his tribemates, especially Colleen and Jenna.: Immunity challenge: The castaways started on a square and moved one square at a time. As they moved, they had to flip over the square they were just on. Each castaway would go until they could no longer move. Last person standing wins immunity.; Rudy won immunity over Sean. Sean was convinced that his alphabet strategy of voting for people was the fairest way and that there was no alliance because he wasn't asked to be a part of it. He continued to vote that way and even told Jenna beforehand that he was voting for her but that he didn't think it would make a difference. At Tribal Council he was once again proved wrong, as Richard, Rudy, and Susan again piggy-backed off his vote and Jenna was voted out.
10	10	"Crack in the Alliance"	Recap	August 2, 2000	27.41	11.9/38
Some people were happy that Jenna was voted out because she was getting on everyone's nerves. Everyone knew that Sean voted for Jenna and Kelly didn't, so the remainder of the Tagi alliance felt betrayed. The alliance thought about replacing Kelly with Sean because he might be more valuable. Richard's plan was to catch more fish once Colleen and Gervase were gone. At tree mail, the castaways were surprised by cigars and a note saying that Gervase's son Gunnar was born the previous day, which they celebrated.: Reward challenge: Each person started at one end of a balance beam. There were three rounds, where the first half to make it to the other end of the balance beam would move on. The first person to get to the end with both feet on the platform without falling off would win a slice of pizza and a phone call home.; Gervase narrowly beat Richard at the reward challenge and had a chance to call his girlfriend and daughter to see how his baby was doing. He shared his slice of pizza with everyone. While he was making his phone call, Rudy questioned Gervase's life choices, namely having four children out of wedlock, and said that having babies out of wedlock would have never happened when he was his age and that the girl would be "taken out of town" and dealt with.: Immunity challenge: Each castaway had a few minutes to grab the kindling necessary to build a fire. They then had to take their torch out to the water to floating woks, light their torch, and bring it back to their pile of wood to start their fire. The first person to burn through their rope won.; At the immunity challenge, Richard easily won. At Tribal Council, the five Tagi members decided that Gervase was a bigger threat than Colleen, voting him out. Ultimately, Kelly decided to vote with her alliance despite her urges to join forces with the others.
11	11	"Long Hard Days"	Recap	August 9, 2000	28.00	12.1/38
The Tagi alliance began to crumble because Kelly was always talking to the remaining enemy of the alliance, Colleen. Camp life started to take a toll on everyone.: Reward challenge: Each castaway was given a questionnaire about Borneo. The person who answered the most correctly won an overnight trip on a yacht and a Visa card.; Sean won the reward and was surprised to see his dad on the yacht. Sean told Kelly he was going to take her for the feast, but chose Richard instead, which infuriated the women. Sean brought his dad back to camp to meet everyone, who attempted to update them on current events and the stock market (although Susan thought he didn't know anything), and before he left he gave each person a care package from their loved ones, which rejuvenated their spirits.: Immunity challenge: Each person stood next to each other on a set of five planks. One plank would be removed over time until they got down to one plank. Whoever stayed on the longest would win.; Rudy fell off first. Richard attempted to annoy people off the planks by singing "99 bottles of beer on the wall" until he fell off. On the beach, Richard thought it was funny that Colleen was really trying to win immunity when she had no chance of going home tonight because they were going to blindside Kelly. Sean was third to go, followed almost immediately by Susan. Colleen fell off after 2 hours and 54 minutes, giving immunity to Kelly and foiling the Tagi alliance plans. At Tribal Council, Sean was grilled for taking Richard on the reward instead of Kelly. Colleen, the last remaining member of Pagong, was voted out.
12	12	"Death of an Alliance"	Recap	August 16, 2000	28.67	12.7/38
With only Tagi tribe members left, the two people that felt vulnerable were Kelly and Sean. Kelly said she didn't trust Richard, while Richard conspired to get Kelly off next. Sean thought he was stuck with the most conniving people ever. Tempers flared at camp as Kelly and Susan had a fight about their alliance since Kelly didn't vote with them again, and Susan said Kelly made them all look like idiots. Richard attempted to smooth things over, but said the fight was to his advantage. Susan got stung by a ray and her hand swelled up. On day 34, all of the castaways talked about how they missed home.: Reward challenge: Under a time limit of five minutes, tribe members dove into a mud pit and covered their body with as much mud as they could, then raced back and scraped it off into a bucket. They could not carry mud in their arms or in their hands, only their body. The buckets were then weighed, and the heaviest bucket would win a cold beer, then picked up, blindfolded and taken to a mysterious bar to watch the first five minutes of this season.; Kelly collected 15.9 lb at the reward challenge, followed by Sean (15.4), Susan (15), Richard (12.8), and Rudy (10). After the reward challenge, Susan and Kelly rekindled their friendship. Kelly went with Jeff to watch the first five minutes of episode 1 and talked to Jeff about how the game was going for her. On day 36, Kelly and Susan agreed to stay civil with each other, although Susan told Kelly she didn't want her in the final three because she was such a threat. Sean knew he needed to win immunity and attempted to exploit the Kelly-Susan friendship.: Immunity challenge: "Survivor Witch Project": Jeff told the castaways a story about Borneo folklore. Once he was done, the castaways went out to the woods (where the masks with questions on them were scattered) with a video camera to record their answers. The first person to get back to the start with all of the masks and the questions right on tape won immunity.; Kelly won her third challenge in a row. Sean said he was definitely winning this thing even though it would be an uphill battle. Richard tried to decide whether to vote for Sean or Rudy, although Rudy was confident that it would be him and Richard in the final two. While everyone spoke of voting for different people, in the end the original Tagi four stuck together and Sean was voted out.
13	13	"The Final Four"	Recap	August 23, 2000	51.69	22.8/54
The final four reflected on how much their bodies had changed, and how the game was played by them and by others. Kelly said she felt like the odd person out and was stressed because she didn't feel safe. She said that she was now playing for herself. Richard, Rudy, and Susan were planning to vote out Kelly if she didn't win immunity.: Immunity challenge: Jeff asked 10 questions about the jury members. The person who answered the most questions right won immunity.; At the challenge, Kelly and Susan were tied after 10 questions, but Kelly got the tiebreaker question correct, giving Kelly her fourth challenge win and third immunity in a row. Directly after at Tribal Council, there was a 2–2 tie between Richard and Susan. During the revote in which only Rudy and Kelly voted, Kelly changed her vote and Susan was voted out. At 4:00 am on day 38, the remaining three were awoken by Jeff, told to put on something comfortable, and took a long boat ride to their rite of passage and final immunity challenge. For their rite of passage, they covered themselves with mud, walked through palm fronds held by locals, passed the torches of their fallen comrades, then passed through a bamboo curtain and walked barefoot through a fire pit.: Final immunity challenge: Each tribe member held on to the immunity idol while standing on a small log. The person who lasted the longest would win immunity.; After two hours of holding on the idol, Jeff tempted the three with oranges. After 2½ hours, Richard gave a speech, said he wouldn't be able to outlast Kelly, and stepped down voluntarily. He said that it was a game of odds and he didn't know what the winner would actually do. After three hours, the remaining two switched positions while keeping their hand on the idol and were to do so every half-hour. While the two were still standing on the pole, Richard spoke of the alliance to Jeff and how he wasn't surprised that Kelly changed her vote. After 4 hours, 11 minutes, Rudy took his hand off the idol while switching spots, and Kelly won immunity yet again. Richard and Rudy each said it was in Kelly's best interest to keep them. At Tribal Council, Kelly voted out Rudy because she thought she might have a better chance of winning defeating Richard than Rudy. At the final Tribal Council, Gervase asked if there were one, two or three things they would change about their time on the island if anything at all. Richard said trusting people so easily, Kelly said making an alliance. Jenna asked who they would put in the final two and why. Richard said Rudy and Greg; Kelly said Sonja and Gretchen. Sean had no questions, but congratulated the two and thanked Kelly for being capable and keeping camp afloat, and told Richard that he enjoyed his company although he played the game differently. Colleen asked what three character traits got them where they were and were essential to get future players to the finals; Kelly said faith, strong will, and likability, while Richard said self-awareness, observation of relationships, and ethics. Rudy said he had nothing to say to those two, but felt dumb after mistakenly removing his hand in the final immunity challenge. Greg had them choose a number between 1 and 10 (Rich said 7; Kelly 3). Susan famously compared Richard to a snake and Kelly to a rat, and declared her intent to vote for Richard. In the end, Rudy, Susan, Sean, and Greg voted for Richard; Jenna, Gervase, and Colleen voted for Kelly. With that, Richard became Survivor's first winner by a narrow vote of 4–3.
14	14	"Reunion"	N/A	August 23, 2000	38.77	22.5/36
The castaways return to discuss the season with Bryant Gumbel.

== Voting history ==
	Original tribes						Merged tribe								
Episode	1	2	3	4	5	6	7	8	9	10	11	12	13		
Day	3	6	9	12	15	18	21	24	27	30	33	36	37		38
Tribe	Tagi	Pagong	Tagi	Pagong	Tagi	Pagong	Rattana	Rattana	Rattana	Rattana	Rattana	Rattana	Rattana		Rattana
Eliminated	Sonja	B.B.	Stacey	Ramona	Dirk	Joel	Gretchen	Greg	Jenna	Gervase	Colleen	Sean	Tie (Note: The first Tribal Council vote resulted in a tie. Per the rules, a second vote was held where the castaways involved in the tie would not vote and the remaining castaways could only vote for those who tied.)	Susan	Rudy
Votes	4–3–1	6–2	5–2	4–2–1	4–1–1	4–2	4–1–1–1–1–1–1	6–3	4–3–1	5–2	4–2	4–1	2–2	2–0	1–0
Voter	Votes														
Richard	Stacey		Stacey		Dirk		Gretchen	Greg	Jenna	Gervase	Colleen	Sean	Susan	None (Note: This player was not eligible to vote in the second round of voting.)	None (Note: Richard and Rudy were not eligible to vote as the only eligible players they could vote for were each other.)
Kelly	Rudy		Rudy		Dirk		Gretchen	Greg	Sean	Gervase	Sean	Sean	Richard	Susan	Rudy
Rudy	Sonja		Stacey		Dirk		Gretchen	Greg	Jenna	Gervase	Colleen	Sean	Susan	Susan	None
Susan	Sonja		Stacey		Dirk		Gretchen	Greg	Jenna	Gervase	Colleen	Sean	Richard	None	
Sean	Sonja		Stacey		Rudy		Colleen	Greg	Jenna	Gervase	Colleen	Susan			
Colleen		B.B.		Ramona		Joel	Richard	Jenna	Richard	Sean	Sean				
Gervase		B.B.		Colleen		Jenna	Susan	Jenna	Richard	Sean					
Jenna		B.B.		Ramona		Joel	Gervase	Greg	Richard						
Greg		Ramona		Jenna		Joel	Jenna	Jenna							
Gretchen		B.B.		Ramona		Joel	Rudy								
Joel		B.B.		Ramona		Jenna									
Dirk	Sonja		Stacey		Susan										
Ramona		B.B.		Colleen											
Stacey	Rudy		Rudy												
B.B.		Ramona													
Sonja	Rudy														

Jury vote
Episode	13	
Day	39	
Finalist	Richard	Kelly
Votes	4–3	
Juror	Votes	
Rudy	Yes	
Susan	Yes	
Sean	Yes	
Colleen		Yes
Gervase		Yes
Jenna		Yes
Greg	Yes	

== Production ==
Over 6,000 people applied for the show; 800 were then interviewed in 16 cities. Forty-eight people were then chosen, and after background checks and psychological evaluations done by the producers, the final 16 contestants and two alternates were picked. As the participants awaited the game's start, crews prepared the island for reward and immunity challenges, removing harmful items, checking for harmful animals in specific locations, and building a set. Camera and other crews were sent to the island three weeks in advance for testing. On the opposite side of the island from the tribes, headquarters were set up for the producers and crew to live in. This facility included traditional trailers with running water, televisions, and a phone line. The set used for the Tribal Council was built 200 yards from the crew's facility.

On March 7, 2000, the contestants were flown to Los Angeles, then to the city of Kota Kinabalu in Malaysian Borneo. From there, they were taken by boat to their island. Contestants were not allowed to speak to one another until they got on the boat headed toward their beaches. The two tribes shared the island of Tiga, which was divided by over 20 miles (32 km) of forest. They were surrounded by wildlife such as pythons, kraits, adders, monkeys, monitor lizards, and white-bellied sea eagles. Filming began on March 13, 2000, and lasted until April 20, 2000. This was the only season to have the winner revealed on location at the final Tribal Council until the show's 41st season in 2021.

== Reception ==
=== Ratings ===
I always believed it was going to generate strong water cooler conversation. Nobody could have predicted the rating success. But I knew that the premise—a group of people marooned on an island, where they had to survive by working together, and they had to work against each other to win a million-dollar prize—I knew that premise was superior.

— Mark Burnett, The New York Times

By the second week, the show had already gained over 18 million viewers, beating ABC's Who Wants to Be a Millionaire?'s ratings. After the season finale, Carter said that Survivor "built over a 13-week run to what was expected last night to be the biggest single television audience ever assembled for a summer television series, far eclipsed every expectation the network had when it acquired the rights to the show last year." Les Moonves, the president of CBS Television, said that "it has beaten our expectations by about double."

The finale of Survivor was watched by 51.7 million viewers, the second-highest viewership of any American television episode during the first decade of the 21st century, exceeded only by the finale of Friends. The finale had higher ratings than the World Series, NBA finals, NCAA men's basketball finals, and Grammy Awards of that year. CBS was able to make the cost of commercial advertisers up to $600,000 during the season finale.

Survivor was the surprise summer hit show of the season garnering an average of 28.3 million viewers with a 12.1/36 share in the 18/49 market over its 13-week run. The season had the second-highest ranking and the second-highest average viewers of the entire series, behind The Australian Outback. In addition to the most finale viewers, it also had the most reunion viewers (37 million).

=== Critical reception ===
Survivor: Borneo initially received mixed reactions in the media. The New York Times' Bill Carter wrote that Survivor has "clearly begun to emerge as part of the wider culture, with news and discussion about the show widespread on television and radio talk shows and coverage increasing in newspapers." On the Late Show with David Letterman, David Letterman began a segment titled "Top 10 Things That'll Get You Thrown Off the Survivor Island." During the first season, USA Today covered the show like a sporting event, listing which participant was voted off. USA Today also held a poll to see who viewers would have voted off. With 26 percent, Susan Hawk won the poll, although it had no effect on the game, as Susan made it to 4th place. CBS's The Early Show held an interview with each contestant the day after the episode in which they were voted off aired.

Survivor: Borneo was criticized by People for the Ethical Treatment of Animals (PETA) in response to footage showing the contestants trapping rats on the island, initially for fish bait but later for human consumption.

I plead to the jury tonight to think a little bit of the island we have been on. This island is full of pretty much only two things: snakes and rats. And in the end of Mother Nature, we have Richard the snake, who knowingly went after prey; and Kelly, who turned into the rat that ran around like rats do on this island, trying to run from the snake. I believe we owe it to the island spirits we have come to know to let it end in the way that Mother Nature intended: for the snake to eat the rat.

— Susan Hawk, Survivor: Borneo, Episode 13

Susan Hawk's "snakes and rats" speech during the final Tribal Council has been cited as one of the greatest and most memorable speeches in the show's history.

Despite the initially mixed reception, Borneo has undergone significant critical reappraisal and is now considered one of the best seasons of the series. Jeff Probst consistently ranks it as his favorite, equating it to a "first girlfriend." Entertainment Weekly columnist Dalton Ross ranks Borneo tied for first with Survivor: Micronesia, saying "Borneo now seems dated and tame by comparison, but it's the biggest game changer in the past 20 years of television...If you ask me which is the most important season, well, obviously it's Borneo." Borneo is also ranked the best season by Examiner.com and Zap2it, and second behind Survivor: Heroes vs. Villains by The Wire.

"Survivor Oz" has consistently ranked Borneo in the top 10 in every one of its annual polls ranking all seasons of the series; it was 5th in 2012, 6th in 2013, and 8th in 2014. "The Purple Rock Podcast" ranked Borneo the 15th best season in 2020. Fifteen years later, in the CBS Watch official issue commemorating the 15th anniversary and 30th season of Survivor, Borneo was ranked the seventh-greatest season of the series by a viewer poll. In another poll in the same magazine, Richard Hatch's win at the end of the season was voted by viewers as the #5 most memorable moment in the series. In 2015, a poll by Rob Has a Podcast ranked Borneo 7th out of 30 with Rob Cesternino ranking this season 5th. This was updated in 2021 during Cesternino's podcast, Survivor All-Time Top 40 Rankings, ranking 13th out of 40. In 2020, Inside Survivor ranked this season 4th out of 40 saying that "Borneo is a season rich in character, providing a fascinating view into society and human relationships within the context of a part-survival/part-strategy game-show." In 2024, Nick Caruso of TVLine ranked this season 3rd out of 47.

Noel Murray of The A.V. Club noted that the 5th episode, "Pulling Your Own Weight", was one of the season's most influential segments. In this episode, the Tagi alliance led by Hatch secretly worked together to vote Dirk Been off the island, surprising many of the remaining contestants, who were shocked to discover the alliance. Murray noted that while this sentiment towards alliances at the time seemed controversial and against the spirit of the show, it formed the basis for most future Survivor series and reality television in general, and highlighted the lengths to which players on reality television shows would go to win the game.

== DVD release ==
The DVD release of season one was released by CBS Home Entertainment in the United States on May 11, 2004, after it had completed broadcast on television. As well as every episode from the season, the DVD release features bonus material including commentary, interviews and behind-the-scenes featurettes.

The Complete First Season
Set details		Special features
Audio commentary; 664 minutes; 5-disc set; 1.33:1 aspect ratio; Languages: English (Dolby Digital 5.1)		Documentaries; Episode summaries; Highlights; Immunity challenges; Reward challenges; Voting results; Survivor profiles; Survivor favorite; Voting history; Final words; The Island
Release dates		Documentaries; Episode summaries; Highlights; Immunity challenges; Reward challenges; Voting results; Survivor profiles; Survivor favorite; Voting history; Final words; The Island
Canada	United States	Documentaries; Episode summaries; Highlights; Immunity challenges; Reward challenges; Voting results; Survivor profiles; Survivor favorite; Voting history; Final words; The Island
May 11, 2004	May 11, 2004	Documentaries; Episode summaries; Highlights; Immunity challenges; Reward challenges; Voting results; Survivor profiles; Survivor favorite; Voting history; Final words; The Island

== Controversy ==
In early 2001, Borneo contestant Stacey Stillman sued CBS, claiming that executive producer Mark Burnett arranged her exit and orchestrated the show's outcome. Her 14-page lawsuit alleged that two of her fellow tribemates, Dirk Been and Sean Kenniff, were persuaded to change their vote from 72-year-old Rudy Boesch to her. Stillman sought restitution for lost prize money, plus $75,000 representing out-of-pocket expenses and punitive damages. While CBS and Burnett denied the allegations, Been supported them; Kenniff admitted talking to Burnett, but told USA Today that the vote wasn't influenced and Burnett said only to "vote your conscience." Burnett counter-sued Stillman for at least $5,000,000. Eventually the case was settled out of court.
