= Richard Hatch (Survivor contestant) =

American reality television contestant (born 1961)

- Born: Richard Holman Hatch Jr. April 8, 1961 (age 65); Newport, Rhode Island, U.S.
- Education: National Louis University
- Television: Survivor: Borneo (winner); Survivor: All-Stars; The Apprentice 11; The Biggest Loser season 17; House of Villains
- Criminal charge: One count of tax evasion
- Criminal penalty: 60 months in prison
- Criminal status: Released
- Spouses: Unnamed Australian woman (m. 1985–1990) Emiliano Cabral (m. 2005; div. 2017)

Richard Holman Hatch Jr. (born April 8, 1961) is an American reality television contestant. In 2000, he became the first Survivor winner (Borneo) in its debut season, originally broadcast on CBS. He subsequently competed in All-Stars season of Survivor, the fourth celebrity edition of Celebrity Apprentice, season 17 of The Biggest Loser, and season 2 of House of Villains. In January 2006, he was convicted with three counts related to attempted tax evasion and fraudulent tax return. He served fifty-one months in prison and then, after failing to amend his 2000 and 2001 tax returns, an additional nine months in prison.

== Early life and education ==
Hatch's parents divorced when he was eleven years old. At the time of Borneo, his mother was a registered nurse, and his father was a retired lab technician. Hatch is the oldest of four siblings.

Hatch graduated from Middletown High School (Rhode Island) in 1979. He studied oceanography and marine biology at the Florida Institute of Technology. He joined the United States Army in 1980 and became a West Point cadet within the next five years in the Army. He earned his bachelor's degree in Management and Applied Behavioral Sciences from the National Louis University. He pursued a master's degree by studying education and counseling at Rhode Island's Providence College.

After the Army, in 1985, Hatch moved to Manhattan and married an unidentified Australian woman. They were estranged throughout most of their marriage that lasted for at least ten years.

Hatch's hometown is Newport, Rhode Island, where he resided at the time. He adopted a seven-year-old boy Christopher in 1998.

== Survivor ==
=== Borneo ===
Hatch was a corporate trainer and consultant for his own business, Tri-Whale Training, when he first competed on Survivor. In Borneo (2000), he came out as gay onscreen, (Note: Hatch has been openly gay since moving to Manhattan in mid-1980s.) notoriously went nude on his birthday, and used resources to catch edible sea creatures underwater. He formed, led, and defended an alliance with his remaining Tagi tribe members who seemed unable to win individually. Strategically, after the two tribes were merged into one, the Tagi alliance voted out every remaining member of the original Pagong tribe.

As four players remained in the season finale, Hatch, Rudy Boesch, and Sue Hawk plotted to vote Kelly Wiglesworth out. The plan was no longer feasible when Wiglesworth won an Individual Immunity challenge called "Fallen Comrades", a trivia quiz mini-game about eliminated contestants. At a Tribal Council, Hatch and Hawk received two votes each. In a tiebreaker, Hatch and Hawk were not permitted to vote. Boesch and Wiglesworth voted Hawk out and kept Hatch for the time being.

As one of three remaining players, Hatch strategically dropped out of the season's final Immunity challenge, leaving Boesch and Wiglesworth to compete against each other. Wiglesworth beat Boesch in the challenge, and as the only player eligible to vote, voted Boesch out and kept Hatch, hoping to beat him in the finals. Fourth-placed Sue Hawk infamously called Kelly a "rat" and Richard a "snake" in the final Council. Hawk further said that, in Mother Nature, a snake would eat a rat.

Against the runner-up Wiglesworth, Hatch earned the "Sole Survivor" title and won $1 million and a Pontiac Aztek SUV by a 4–3 jury vote of the final Tribal Council. Hatch received votes from 3 of his original Tagi tribemates (Rudy, Susan, and Sean) and a vote from Greg. The other three jury members, who originated from the Pagong tribe, voted for Kelly. Hatch's victory was controversial at the time since Greg's decisive vote seemed to be cast due to the result of a "pick-a-number" question, but Greg has stated that he had always intended to vote for Richard and his question was his way to poke fun at the serious nature of the Final Tribal Council.

=== All-Stars ===
Hatch re-competed in All-Star (2004) as part of the Mogo Mogo tribe. (Note: Mogo Mogo gained two extra members of the Saboga tribe, which dissolved when Saboga finished third and last in one of tribal reward challenges.) As before, he caught edible sea creatures with available resources. Mogo Mogo became weary about his antics, attitude, and constant nudity. Thus, he became the fourth person of the season and the first member of the tribe voted out, placing fourteenth. (Note: Another Mogo Mogo member, Survivor: The Amazon Jenna Morasca, quit the game earlier to attend her dying mother, who died eight days later.)

External videos
- "Survivor All-Stars: My side of the story" (2020) by Richard Hatch on YouTube

Before his elimination, Hatch was involved in an incident with another former Borneo player Sue Hawk, who reappeared in the same season as part of the Chapera tribe. During one of the tribal immunity challenges, Hawk and Hatch came face-to-face on a small platform during a balance beam mini-game. Hatch, who had completely undressed for the challenge, put his hands behind his head and thrust his genitals towards Hawk, saying "you want some?" The next day, Hawk stated that his genitals touched her. Also on that day, Hawk resigned from the game voluntarily, too upset to continue. Hatch and Hawk discussed the incident in the February 27, 2004, episode of The Early Show, the following day after the Survivor episode aired the incident.

== Other appearances ==
In post-Borneo era, Hatch made guest appearances as himself on "One Wong Move" (2000) from Becker and, alongside Sue Hawk, "Penetration Island" (2002) from Son of the Beach. In Becker, Hatch visits the titular character's office for his severe stomachache and makes references to his Survivor gameplay, like eating bizarre things.

Hatch also wrote his 2000 book 101 Survival Secrets: How to Make $1 Million, Lose 100 pounds and Live Happily Ever After. According to a November 2000 interview, he lost more than 100 pounds within the past two years up to Borneo and then, after the filming was completed, having his excess inelastic tissue removed from his abdomen via resection surgery in May 2000.

Hatch appeared alongside three other Survivor players—Hawk, Jenna Lewis and Gervase Peterson—in Hollywood Squares on the week of September 25, 2000.

In the Australian version of Who Wants to Be a Millionaire? in October 2000, Hatch incorrectly answered the fourth question "What is 11 × 12?", resulting in his elimination without winning money. He competed against other five Borneo players in the May 10, 2001, episode of Weakest Link. Despite correctly answering most questions, he was unanimously voted out as the "weakest link" in the first round.

Hatch competed in the July 15, 2002, episode (all-reality edition) of a game show Dog Eat Dog. He became part of a "dog pound" team after losing a challenge. The team lost the $25,000 prize to Borneo player Sue Hawk.

In post-All-Stars era, Hatch competed in the Survivor edition of Family Feud, aired on the week of February 14, 2005, alongside other Survivor players, including Rudy Boesch and Sue Hawk, who were divided into male and female teams. He competed on Battle of the Network Reality Stars in 2005 as part of the "dark blue" team, which lost the $10,000 prize to the "light blue" team in the finals. He was "fired" in the April 3, 2011, episode of The Celebrity Apprentice 4. He was eliminated in the January 18, 2016 episode of the 17th season of The Biggest Loser for not losing enough weight.

TV Guide placed him thirty-first in its 2013 list of "The 60 Nastiest Villains of All Time" for his Survivor gameplay.

Hatch competed in the second season (2024) of E!'s reality television series House of Villains and became the second contestant eliminated in the fourth episode of the season.

== Acquittals and convictions ==
In September 2001, Hatch was convicted in a county district court with domestic assault charge, one month after his former partner Glenn Boyanowski accused him of assault. Hatch said that the assault started when Boyanowski trespassed his Middletown house. Hatch was sentenced to one-year probation on September 24, 2001, and was ordered not to contact Boyanowski. He appealed his conviction and sentence, both of which were overturned in a county superior court on February 5, 2002, after two days of court hearings.

In September 2005, Hatch was indicted by a federal grand jury on two counts of tax evasion, one count of filing a false tax return, two counts of wire fraud, four counts of mail fraud, and one count of bank fraud. In January 2006, he was acquitted of fraud but convicted of the three tax charges. The charges stemmed from his failure to report approximately $1.4 million in income: $1.04 million from Survivor, $321,000 in payments for radio appearances, $28,000 of rental income, and $36,000 in charitable donations misappropriated for personal use. Tax returns were prepared by two accountants that reflected his Survivor winnings that Hatch did not file. Instead, he filed a return that excluded that income.

His 51-month prison sentence reflected an enhancement for obstruction of justice.

In 2010, one year after Hatch's release in 2009, Survivor host/producer Jeff Probst and producer Mark Burnett revealed that Hatch was a strong candidate to reappear for the twentieth season, Survivor: Heroes vs. Villains, as a villain. Hatch was still under house arrest at the time and unable to participate because prosecutors denied him permission to do so.

Hatch served an additional nine months in prison from March to December 2011 for not amending his 2000 and 2001 tax returns. The additional sentence prevented him from appearing in the live finale of The Celebrity Apprentice 4. He was released under supervision for 26 further months, making him unable to leave the country without court permission.

== Personal life ==
After the All-Stars filming, Hatch dated an Argentine tourist director Emiliano Cabral, whose age was twenty-eight in early 2004. They legally married in Nova Scotia in 2005. They divorced in a Rhode Island family court in 2022 after at least fourteen years of their relationship.

According to Inside Edition, while he attended George Mason University (Virginia), Hatch donated his sperm to a sperm bank in Fairfax, Virginia, hundreds of times total for two years, twice or thrice per week average, to earn $30 per donation. Two different women who were donated Hatch's sperm eventually gave birth to, respectively, one daughter and one son. In 2011, he met his two biological children, both age twenty-two at the time, for the first time.

In 2013, a property purchased by Hatch in Sydney, Nova Scotia, following his Survivor win was included in a tax sale during a public auction. As the Cape Breton Regional Municipality tax office indicated, Hatch had not paid property taxes on the property for a period of more than six years.

== Filmography ==
Year	Title	Notes
2000	Survivor: Borneo	Winner
2000	Hollywood Squares	
2000	Becker	Cameo (Episode "One Wrong Move")
2000	Who Wants to Be a Millionaire? (Australian edition)	
2001	Weakest Link (American edition)	Survivor: Borneo special
2002	Dog Eat Dog	Gameshow
2002	Son of the Beach	Episode "Penetration Island"
2004	Survivor: All-Stars	Eliminated; 14th place
2005	Family Feud	Survivor special
2005	Battle of the Network Reality Stars	
2006	Another Gay Movie	
2011	The Celebrity Apprentice 4	
2016	The Biggest Loser	Eliminated; 13th place
2024	House of Villains 2	Eliminated; 10th place

Preceded by --	Winner of Survivor; Survivor: Borneo	Succeeded by Tina Wesson
