= Sue Hawk =

American reality TV personality (born 1961)

- Born: Susan Hawk; August 17, 1961 (age 65); Waukesha, Wisconsin, U.S.
- Television: Survivor: Borneo; Survivor: All-Stars

Susan Hawk (born August 17, 1961) is a truck driver best known for participating in Survivor: Borneo (2000) and Survivor: All-Stars (2004).

== Early life ==
Hawk was a truck driver previously residing in Palmyra, Wisconsin, when she first competed on Survivor: Borneo. Before then, she owned and managed a hunting and fishing camp in Northwestern Ontario, Canada. She previously was a horse trainer and a bartender-waitress.

== Survivor ==
=== Borneo ===
In Survivor: Borneo, Hawk was part of the alliance of the remaining Tagi tribe, which voted out every remaining member of the opposing Pagong tribe after the two tribes merged into one. As four players remained in Borneo, she, Richard Hatch, and Rudy Boesch plotted to vote Kelly Wiglesworth out, but the idea was abandoned when Wiglesworth won an Individual Immunity challenge called "Fallen Comrades", a trivia quiz mini-game about eliminated contestants. At a Tribal Council in the season finale, Hawk and Hatch received two votes each. In a tiebreaker, Hawk and Hatch were disallowed to vote. Boesch and Wiglesworth voted Hawk out, making her overall the thirteenth player voted off and then the sixth jury member of the final Tribal Council, placing fourth. During the final Council, Sue called Richard a "snake" and Kelly a "rat" in her famous speech. Hawk further said that, in Mother Nature, snake would eat a rat. She, as a jury member, further declared to the jury her vote for eventual winner Richard over runner-up Wiglesworth.

=== All-Stars ===
Hawk re-competed in Survivor: All-Stars (2004) as part of the Chapera tribe. She was involved in an incident with another former Borneo player Richard Hatch, who reappeared in the same season as part of the Mogo Mogo tribe. Hawk later claimed that, during one of tribal immunity challenges, which was a balance beam mini-game, Hatch's genitals touched her as he passed her by on the course. The following day, after Hatch was voted out, Hawk resigned from the game voluntarily as she was too upset to continue. Hawk and Hatch discussed the incident in the February 27, 2004, episode of The Early Show, the following day after the Survivor episode aired the incident.

== Other appearances ==
After Borneo, Hawk appeared as a guest co-host of Live with Regis in September 2000. She also was cast to appear on the fourth episode (2000) of a short-lived American sitcom DAG, portraying her first guest-starring role who resembled Hawk on Survivor herself especially via dialogue, said its co-creator and executive producer Jack Burditt. A year later, Hawk competed in USA Network's Cannonball Run 2001 teaming with fellow Survivor alumnus Jeff Varner (who had placed tenth in then-recently aired second season in Australia) and Kaya Wittenburg (who had recently appeared in the first season of the similarly-themed reality series Temptation Island). The trio, called "The Castaways" placed fourth out of six teams. She also appeared on the third season premiere of Son of the Beach alongside Borneo winner Richard Hatch. Hawk competed in the July 15, 2002, episode (all-reality edition) of a game show Dog Eat Dog. She won the "top dog" title and the $25,000 prize against the "dog pound" team.

After All-Stars, Hawk also competed alongside other Survivor players who were divided into male and female teams in Family Feud, aired on the week of February 14, 2005. She also competed in Battle of the Network Reality Stars (2005) as part of the "green" team, which lost to the "light blue" team in one challenge and then was eliminated.

== Personal life ==
Hawk's house and barn are located in Clever, Missouri, as of May 2007. She has been married to her husband since the 1980s.

== Selected filmography ==
- Survivor: Borneo (2000) – finished in fourth place
- Cannonball Run 2001 (2001) – finished fourth as a member of "The Castaways"
- Dog Eat Dog (2002) – won $25,000 and the "top dog" title
- Son of the Beach, "Penetration Island" (2002) – herself
- Survivor: All-Stars (2004) – voluntarily resigned from the season
- Family Feud, Survivor week (2005) – among the female team
- Battle of the Network Reality Stars (2005) – among the "green" team, which was eliminated
