= Kyle Fraser =

American television personality (born 1993)

- Born: Kyle Irving Fraser; October 31, 1993 (age 32); Bronxville, New York, U.S.
- Education: Hampden–Sydney College (B.A.); University of Michigan Law School
- Occupations: Reality television personality; lawyer
- Years active: 2024–present
- Television: Survivor 48 (winner); Survivor 50: In the Hands of the Fans
- Spouse: Maggie Fraser (m. 2024)

Kyle Irving Fraser (born October 31, 1993) is an American reality television personality and lawyer. Best known for competing on the reality television series Survivor, he is the winner of Survivor 48 and a contestant on Survivor 50: In the Hands of the Fans.

== Background and education ==
Fraser was born in Bronxville, New York, but his family moved to Salem, Virginia, where he was raised. His father is a Guyanese immigrant and mother a native of New York. He earned a Bachelor of Arts in English from Hampden–Sydney College in 2016, where he was captain of the lacrosse team and a member of Sigma Chi fraternity. He proceeded to attend University of Michigan Law School, where he served as a senior editor for the Michigan Law Review, earned third place in the campus wide Moot court competition, and received the Irving Stenn Jr. Award at graduation.

== Career ==
Fraser worked as a teacher, including teaching high school English, coaching, and serving as a dorm parent at Christ School in Asheville, North Carolina. He also taught GED and humanities courses at a juvenile detention center in Laurel, Maryland.

After law school, Fraser clerked for the Honorable R. Guy Cole Jr. on the United States Court of Appeals for the Sixth Circuit. Following his clerkship, he rejoined the law firm Morvillo Abramowitz Grand Iason & Anello PC in New York City as an associate. Fraser has been an associate counsel for Warner Music Group since October 2025.

== Survivor ==
=== Survivor 48 ===
Fraser applied for Survivor after being introduced to the show during the COVID-19 pandemic. In Survivor 48, filmed in Fiji, he concealed his profession as a lawyer, telling tribemates he was a teacher.

Fraser's game was defined by his playing the middle, and forming a secret, season-long alliance with fellow contestant Kamilla Karthigesu. He emphasized a "people first" mantra, focusing on building genuine connections to navigate the game. After a tribe swap placed him in the minority, he and Karthigesu successfully implemented a key move. They carried out a blindside execution of strategic threat Thomas Krottinger, using a Hidden Immunity Idol and an Extra Vote to secure their position. He later integrated into the majority "Strong Five" alliance while maintaining his secret partnership. From this position, he helped orchestrate key blindsides, including David Kinne, and that of Shauhin Davari, by lying to his closest allies to turn them against each other. He won three individual challenges during the season, including the final Immunity Challenge. He chose to bring ally Joe Hunter to the Final Tribal Council, pitting Kamilla Karthigesu against Eva Erickson in fire-making, which Erickson won. At the final jury questioning, Fraser detailed his behind-the-scenes strategic moves, and well-rounded gameplay, as well as his legal background and history with incarceration, which surprised and impressed the jury. He won in a 5–2–1 vote against finalists Erickson and Hunter.

=== Survivor 50 ===
Four days after the Survivor 48 finale aired, Fraser returned to Fiji to film Survivor 50: In the Hands of the Fans, an all-returnee season celebrating the series's anniversary scheduled to premiere in February 2026. In the first immunity challenge of the season, Fraser landed awkwardly after attempting to scale a ramp, being unable to put weight on his left leg. The following day, he was removed from the game by the Survivor medics over fears he had ruptured his Achilles tendon, which were proven to be true.

== Personal life ==
Fraser is married to wife, Maggie Fraser (née Turner). The couple are expecting a daughter. He is also a dog dad. Fraser has spoken publicly about overcoming his challenging youth, including past involvement with the legal system and incarceration for non-violent misdemeanors. Fraser partners with nonprofit organizations in New York, including Getting Out and Staying Out (GOSO) and the Chelsea Piers Foundation.

== Filmography ==
=== Reality competition ===
Year	Title	Role	Notes
2025	Survivor 48	Contestant	Winner
2026	Survivor 50: In the Hands of the Fans	Contestant	Medically evacuated

Preceded by Rachel LaMont	Winner of Survivor; Survivor 48	Succeeded by Savannah Louie
