= Survivor 48 =

Season of television series

- Season 48
- Presented by: Jeff Probst
- No. of days: 26
- No. of castaways: 18
- Winner: Kyle Fraser
- Runner-up: Eva Erickson
- Location: Mamanuca Islands, Fiji
- No. of episodes: 13

Release
- Original network: CBS
- Original release: February 26 – May 21, 2025

Additional information
- Filming dates: June 27 – July 22, 2024

Season chronology
- ← Previous; Survivor 47 Next → Survivor 49

Survivor 48 is the forty-eighth season of the American competitive reality television series Survivor. It premiered on February 26, 2025, on CBS in the United States, and was the sixteenth consecutive season to be filmed in the Mamanuca Islands in Fiji.

The season ended on May 21, 2025, when Kyle Fraser was voted the Sole Survivor, defeating Eva Erickson and Joe Hunter in a 5–2–1 vote. Fraser became the sixth black castaway to win, following Maryanne Oketch in Survivor 42, Wendell Holland in Survivor: Ghost Island, Jeremy Collins in Survivor: Cambodia, Earl Cole in Survivor: Fiji, and Vecepia Towery in Survivor: Marquesas.

== Format ==
Survivor is a reality television show based on the Swedish show Expedition Robinson, created by Mark Burnett and Charlie Parsons. The series follows a number of participants isolated in a remote location, where they must provide food, fire, and shelter. One by one, a participant is removed from the series by majority vote, with challenges held to give a reward (ranging from living- and food-related prizes to a car) and immunity from being voted out of the series. The last remaining player receives a prize of $1,000,000.

== Contestants ==
The cast of Survivor 48. Eventual winner Kyle Fraser at the far-most left of the left group (original Civa).

The 18 castaways competing on Survivor 48 were officially announced on January 29, 2025, with the castaways divided into three tribes: Civa, Lagi, and Vula. The name of the merged tribe is Niu Nai, a name coined by contestants David Kinne and Mary Zheng from the Chinese term Niu Nai, meaning "milk". Notable castaways include frequent Today Show contributor Dr. Cedrek McFadden. The cast also includes Eva Erickson, the first openly autistic person to compete in the history of the show.

List of Survivor 48 contestants
Contestant	Age	From	Tribe				Finish	
Contestant	Age	From	Original	Switched	None	Merged	Placement	Day
Stephanie Berger	37	Brooklyn, New York	Vula				1st voted out	Day 3
Kevin Leung	33	Livermore, California	Vula				2nd voted out	Day 5
Justin Pioppi	29	Winthrop, Massachusetts	Vula				3rd voted out	Day 7
Thomas Krottinger	34	Los Angeles, California	Lagi	Vula			4th voted out	Day 9
Bianca Roses	32	Arlington, Virginia	Lagi	Civa			5th voted out	Day 11
Charity Nelms	33	St. Petersburg, Florida	Civa	Lagi	None (Note: At the start of the individual phase of the game on Day 12, players had to earn their way into the merged tribe by either winning immunity or surviving the Day 13 Tribal Council.)		6th voted out	Day 13
Saiounia Hughley	29	Simi Valley, California	Vula	Civa	None	Niu Nai	7th voted out	Day 14
Cedrek McFadden	46	Greenville, South Carolina	Vula	Civa	None	Niu Nai	8th voted out 1st jury member	Day 14
Chrissy Sarnowsky	54	Chicago, Illinois	Civa	Civa	None	Niu Nai	9th voted out 2nd jury member	Day 15
David Kinne	38	Buena Park, California	Civa	Lagi	None	Niu Nai	10th voted out 3rd jury member	Day 17
Star Toomey	27	Augusta, Georgia	Lagi	Lagi	None	Niu Nai	11th voted out 4th jury member	Day 19
Mary Zheng	30	Philadelphia, Pennsylvania	Vula	Lagi	None	Niu Nai	12th voted out 5th jury member	Day 21
Shauhin Davari	37	Costa Mesa, California	Lagi	Vula	None	Niu Nai	13th voted out 6th jury member	Day 23
Mitch Guerra	34	Waco, Texas	Civa	Civa	None	Niu Nai	14th voted out 7th jury member	Day 24
Kamilla Karthigesu	30	Foster City, California	Civa	Vula	None	Niu Nai	Eliminated; 8th jury member	Day 25
Joe Hunter	45	West Sacramento, California	Lagi	Vula	None	Niu Nai	2nd runner-up	Day 26
Eva Erickson	23	Providence, Rhode Island	Lagi	Lagi	None	Niu Nai	Runner-up	Day 26
Kyle Fraser	30	Brooklyn, New York	Civa	Vula	None	Niu Nai	Sole Survivor	Day 26

=== Future appearances ===
Kyle Fraser, Joe Hunter, and Kamilla Karthigesu returned to compete on Survivor 50: In the Hands of the Fans.

== Season summary ==
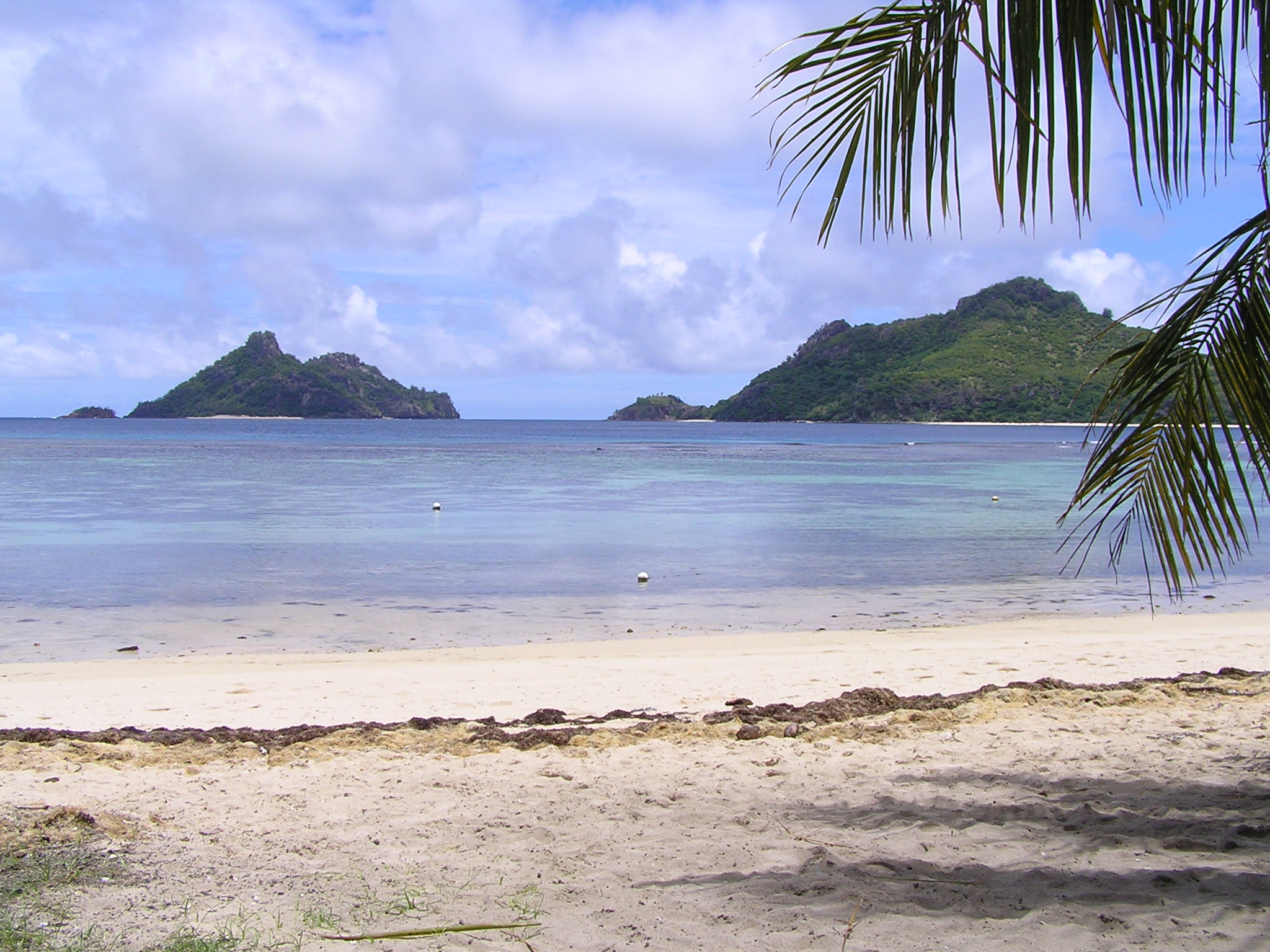
The season filmed in the Mamanuca Islands of Fiji.

Eighteen new players were divided into three tribes of six: Lagi, Civa, and Vula. Vula lost the first three immunity challenges and went through interpersonal conflicts. Duos formed on Lagi (Joe and Eva) and Civa (Kyle and Kamilla), though both tribes avoided Tribal Council. Following a tribe switch, Kyle and Kamilla kept their alliance hidden and, despite being outnumbered at first, took control of the tribe after Kyle successfully played a Hidden Immunity Idol. After an emotional immunity challenge, old adversaries Eva and Star set their differences aside, and Star gave her the Hidden Immunity Idol after Eva helped decipher the clues.

Following the merge, the strong players (David, Eva, Joe, Kyle, and Shauhin) formed an alliance based on strength and loyalty, but the other four betrayed David. Kyle spent the post-merge navigating between his majority alliance and secret alliance with Kamilla. Despite being on the bottom throughout the merge, Kamilla repeatedly survived due to bigger threats emerging and Kamilla having Kyle in her corner. At the final six, Kyle moved against Joe and Eva, as he worked with Kamilla to manipulate the two to take out their ally Shauhin.

At the final 4, Kyle won the final immunity challenge and chose to pit Kamilla against Eva in the fire challenge, as he felt he had a higher chance of winning with Kamilla not in the final three; Eva defeated Kamilla in the challenge. At the Final Tribal Council, Eva and Joe refused to campaign against each other and differentiate their games, while Kyle pointed out the relationships he formed and how he orchestrated Shauhin's blindside. Ultimately, Kyle was awarded the win over Eva and Joe in a 5-2-1 vote, respectively, due to his strong social and strategic games.

Survivor 48 season summary
Episode			Challenge winner(s)		Journey	Eliminated	
No.	Title	Air date	Reward	Immunity	Journey	Tribe	Player
1	"The Get to Know You Game"	February 26, 2025	Lagi	None	None	Vula	Stephanie
1	"The Get to Know You Game"	February 26, 2025	Lagi		None	Vula	Stephanie
1	"The Get to Know You Game"	February 26, 2025	Civa		None	Vula	Stephanie
2	"Humble Traits"	March 5, 2025	Civa		Mary (Vula)	Vula	Kevin
2	"Humble Traits"	March 5, 2025	Civa		Mitch (Civa)	Vula	Kevin
2	"Humble Traits"	March 5, 2025	Lagi		Thomas (Lagi)	Vula	Kevin
3	"Committing to the Bit"	March 12, 2025	Lagi		Bianca (Lagi)	Vula	Justin
3	"Committing to the Bit"	March 12, 2025	Lagi		Justin (Vula)	Vula	Justin
3	"Committing to the Bit"	March 12, 2025	Civa		Kamilla (Civa)	Vula	Justin
4	"The House Party’s Over"	March 19, 2025	Lagi		None	Vula	Thomas
4	"The House Party’s Over"	March 19, 2025	Civa		None	Vula	Thomas
5	"Master Class in Deception"	March 26, 2025	Lagi	Vula	None	Civa	Bianca
5	"Master Class in Deception"	March 26, 2025	Vula	Lagi	None	Civa	Bianca
6	"Doing the Damn Thing"	April 2, 2025	Chrissy, David, Kamilla, Kyle, Mary, Star [Saiounia] (Note: After finding an advantage on Day 12, Saiounia was automatically given reward and the chance to compete for immunity.)	Kyle	None	None	Charity
7	"Survivor Smack Talk"	April 9, 2025	David [Cedrek, Kamilla, Kyle, Mary, Shauhin] (Note: In addition to immunity, David won reward for his entire team for lasting the longest in the challenge.)	Joe	None	Niu Nai	Saiounia
7	"Survivor Smack Talk"	April 9, 2025	David [Cedrek, Kamilla, Kyle, Mary, Shauhin]	David	None	Niu Nai	Cedrek
8	"A Rift Between All of Us"	April 16, 2025	David, Eva, Joe, Mary	Eva	Kamila, Mitch, Shauhin, Star	Niu Nai	Chrissy
9	"Welcome to the Party"	April 23, 2025	Joe [Eva, Mitch, Shauhin] (Note: In addition to immunity, Joe won reward for himself and three other castaways of his choice; he chose Eva, Mitch and Shauhin.)	Joe	None	Niu Nai	David
10	"My Enemies Are Plottin'"	April 30, 2025	Kyle [Eva, Kamilla, Shauhin]	Joe	None	Niu Nai	Star
11	"Coconut Etiquette"	May 7, 2025	Kamilla [Eva, Mitch] (Note: In addition to immunity, Kamilla won reward for herself and two other castaways of her choice; she chose Eva and Mitch.)	Kamilla	Eva	Niu Nai	Mary
12	"Icarus Time"	May 14, 2025	Shauhin [Joe, Kyle]	Joe	None	Niu Nai	Shauhin
13	"Only One of Yous Can Win"	May 21, 2025	Kamilla [Eva] (Note: In addition to immunity, Kamilla won reward for herself and one other castaway of her choice; she chose Eva.)	Kamilla	None	Niu Nai	Mitch
13	"Only One of Yous Can Win"	May 21, 2025	None	Kyle (Note: For winning the final Immunity Challenge, Kyle had to assign additional immunity to another player, with the remaining two competing in a fire-making challenge to determine the third finalist; he gave additional immunity to Joe.) [Joe]	None	Niu Nai	Kamilla

== Episodes ==
No. overall	No. in season	Title	Rating/share (18–49)	Original release date	U.S. viewers (millions)
689	1	"The Get to Know You Game"	0.7/9	February 26, 2025	4.27
The 18 new castaways began their adventure.: Marooning Challenge: Each tribe formed 3 pairs. Each pair sprinted down the beach and crawled through a mud pit under a heavy cargo net, then ran to retrieve a heavy chest to carry back to their mat before the next pair went. After retrieving all three chests, three tribe members climbed a steep slide to the top of a platform. Using a pole, they knocked off a key ring used to open the chest. They retrieved sandbags from the chest which they tossed onto three small high platforms. The first tribe to land all three sandbags won a pot, machete, and flint.; Lagi won the challenge. Kyle from Civa and Kevin from Vula were selected to compete for their tribes' supplies.: Supply Challenge: Following a buried rope that had a machete locked to the end, they used the machete to chop open a coconut to retrieve a key to unlock the machete. They then had to retrieve a pot from the top of a tall pole by any means possible. They filled the pot with seawater and used that to fill a large glass jug to float a key to the top that would unlock a flint. The one who unlocked the flint won the supplies. Kevin won when Kyle accidentally broke his jug. Kyle, in a demonstration of sportsmanship, then helped Kevin finish filling his bottle.; At Civa, Kyle and Kamilla bonded and brought David and Chrissy into a majority, while the whole tribe tried to decipher the meaning of numbers and animal symbols at camp. At Lagi, the men aligned and debated whether to bring Eva (who Joe bonded with) or Bianca (who Thomas bonded with) into a majority. Feeling the odd person out, Star searched for an advantage, but her extended absence was noticed by everyone. At Vula, Saiounia’s frustration with Mary and Stephanie’s disinterest in strategizing led her to align with the men. She discovered a Beware Advantage and, with the help of her alliance, cracked the cypher to earn an idol.: Immunity Challenge: Players raced over a massive net ramp and through a net tunnel. One player used a Fijian war club to smash a mask, releasing a box with a key in it. The key unlocked a heavy sled that the team moved down a track, over some sandbags, and up an incline to the top of a tall platform. Two players then used the pieces inside the sled to assemble a Survivor logo puzzle. The first two teams to finish won immunity plus a large shelter-building kit for first place and a smaller toolkit for second place while the losing tribe had to forfeit their flint.; Lagi and Civa won. Saiounia targeted Stephanie for her puzzle performance; Mary and Stephanie in turn targeted Saiounia, feeling threatened by her aggressive gameplay. Kevin and Justin debated turning on Saiounia despite their wariness of her idol. At Tribal Council, Saiounia and Stephanie disagreed over their differing approaches to the game. Ultimately, everyone except Mary voted out Stephanie, who attempted a failed Shot in the Dark.
690	2	"Humble Traits"	0.6/8	March 5, 2025	4.31
Despite Saiounia insisting Mary should go next, Kevin told Cedrek and Justin he hoped to blindside Saiounia. At Lagi, Star found the Beware Advantage and asked everyone except Eva to help her decipher it; Thomas tried to convince Shauhin to ditch the advantage clue and stall long enough to vote Star out, making Shauhin wary of Thomas.: Journey: Mary, Mitch, and Thomas went on a journey where they had to solve a timed puzzle involving arranging numbered wooden blocks. If they failed to complete the puzzle in the time allotted, they lost their vote; if completed in time, they received an advantage. Mitch won a Block a Vote and Thomas won a Steal a Vote. Mary lost her vote.; Back at Vula, Mary confessed to losing her vote. Thomas told Lagi he protected his vote by not playing, while Mitch told Civa he won a Block a Vote, to Charity’s elation. The other four on Civa searched for an advantage, which Kyle found and Kamilla helped decode, earning Kyle an idol.: Reward/Immunity Challenge: Starting on a floating platform, one castaway climbed a ladder to the top of the platform and dove into the water to swim under a platform and release two buoys. They placed the buoys in trays on the platform and then swam under a second platform over to a third. Once there, the remaining castaways swam in pairs to the first platform and, working together, transported the buoys over a balance beam using poles. Once all players had reached the final platform with their buoys, they took turns shooting the buoys into a basket. The first two tribes to land all five buoys won immunity and a large fishing kit for first place and a smaller fishing kit for second place, while the losing tribe had to forfeit their flint.; Thomas was injured when Bianca accidentally jabbed her pole into his eye, but he continued. Civa and Lagi won following Cedrek and Kevin’s poor showing on the balance beam. Saiounia rallied against Mary, who appeared helpless without a vote, but Kevin continued to target Saiounia. Cedrek told Saiounia of Kevin’s plot and urged her to play her idol, making Saiounia target Kevin instead, though Cedrek and Justin were reluctant to vote out their strongest member. At Tribal Council, Saiounia played her idol to negate Kevin’s vote, and everyone except Mary blindsided Kevin.
691	3	"Committing to the Bit"	0.7/9	March 12, 2025	4.63
At Vula, Mary evaded Saiounia’s attempts to follow her around to prevent her finding an advantage. Tipped off by Joe about Star's unsolved Beware Advantage on Lagi, Eva tested Star's honesty by appearing to talk strategy, but this backfired when Star told Bianca and Thomas that Eva had thrown their names out as possible sacrifices. Shauhin and Thomas were also wary of Eva’s close bond with Joe, which she made no secret of in front of the rest of the tribe. At Civa, David and Kyle weighed their options after Mitch approached them for an alliance with himself and Charity.: Reward/Immunity Challenge: A caller for each tribe directed their three blindfolded tribemates around and through obstacles, searching for three key bags that were used to unlock a slide puzzle. The caller then led the blindfolded members to the puzzle table and directed a still-blindfolded tribemate in solving the puzzle. The first two tribes to complete their puzzle won immunity and a large comfort kit for first place and a smaller tarp for second place, while the losing tribe had to forfeit their flint.; Lagi and Civa won yet again. Immediately following the challenge, Lagi had to choose one person from each tribe to go on a journey; Bianca, Justin, and Kamilla were chosen.: Journey: The players each had to roll eight dice with flames and skulls until they got four of either; four flames won the advantage, while four skulls cost them their next vote. Bianca and Justin lost their vote, while Kamilla won an extra vote.; Following Mitch's example, Kamilla reluctantly told the rest of Civa about her extra vote, while Bianca confided in Thomas after keeping it from her other tribemates. At Vula, Justin did not disclose he lost his vote, even to Cedrek. Mary intentionally refrained from searching for an advantage to give Saiounia the perception she had already found it. Saiounia felt uneasy about Mary’s behavior and tried to convince Cedrek to split the vote on Justin; both Cedrek and Justin argued that Mary was bluffing, which Mary played up when Saiounia directly confronted her. At Tribal Council, Mary played her Shot in the Dark and successfully negated the two votes against her. On the revote, Saiounia voted Justin while Cedrek voted Saiounia; neither changed their vote on the second revote, leading to a deadlock. Cedrek, the only person who had not been voted for, was left with the final decision. Saiounia passionately argued that Justin's hiding his lost vote was a sign of his dishonesty. Cedrek, on the condition that Saiounia and Mary learn to work together, sent Justin home.
692	4	"The House Party's Over"	0.8/10	March 19, 2025	4.70
On day 8, Jeff announced a tribe switch. The new Civa had Bianca, Cedrek, Chrissy, Mitch, and Saiounia "Sai". The new Lagi had Charity, David, Eva, Mary, and Star. The new Vula had Joe, Kamilla, Kyle, Shauhin, and Thomas. At Civa, Cedrek and Mitch bonded over their experiences with stuttering, while Bianca hoped to align with Saiounia and Cedrek, but Saiounia threw Cedrek under the bus. At Lagi, Eva offered Star up on the chopping block and bonded with David, who conspired to blindside Charity. At Vula, Kamilla told everyone Mitch was forced to play for an advantage on his journey, making Joe and Shauhin wary since Thomas said he chose not to play to protect his vote.: Reward/Immunity Challenge: Tribes raced to remove heavy sandbags from a large cube, then moved said cube under a high structure to retrieve two bags of small sandbags. They then had to toss the sandbags through a rectangular frame and land them on a barrel. If they knocked down the frame, they had to reset it and start over again. Finally, they had to dig up a large puzzle piece and race to a platform and build a temple puzzle. The first two tribes to complete their puzzle won immunity plus a large array of fresh fruits for first place and a smaller fruit array for second place, while the losing tribe had to forfeit their flint.; Even with new members, Vula lost again. Kamilla secretly gave Kyle her extra vote, and they pretended to be against each other to trick the Lagi alliance. At Tribal Council, the Lagis voted Kyle, who played his idol. Kamilla and Kyle’s votes blindsided Thomas, sending him home with a Steal-a-Vote in his pocket.
693	5	"Master Class in Deception"	0.7/10	March 26, 2025	4.77
Kyle revealed via confessional that he used Kamilla’s extra vote.: Reward Challenge: Tribemates took turns throwing sandbags at a rotating target to release a bag of three balls. They then bounced the balls off a net into a basket. When all three balls were in the basket, they carried the basket to the final phase where they rolled the three balls on sloped platforms into three target holes. First place got a trip to Sanctuary with coffee, beverages, cheese, pastries and sandwiches. Second place got a platter of pastries with juices back at camp.; Lagi and Vula won reward. Saiounia’s anger at Mary’s excitement over winning aggravated her tribemates. The Vula members bonded during their reward, vowing to stick together.: Immunity Challenge: Tribes jumped into the ocean and swam to shore pulling a boat with a chest in it. They then carried the chest up the beach where they had to unbraid ropes to retrieve a key to unlock the chest. They then dug in the chest for four balls. Once they had the balls, they dug a passage under a log. Once everyone had passed under the log, each tribe member had to maneuver a ball through a table maze to a different target hole. The first two tribes to finish won immunity, while the losing tribe had to forfeit their flint.; Vula and Lagi won immunity, and emotions ran high when Eva opened up to everyone about her autism after becoming overstimulated at the challenge and being consoled by Joe. At Lagi, Eva also decoded Star’s beware advantage, and Star gave Eva the idol, forging a new alliance. All people in the new Lagi team cheered for Eva. At Civa, Bianca told Cedrek she had no vote minutes before Tribal. However, this backfired as Chrissy joined Cedrek in eliminating a devastated Bianca.
694	6	"Doing the Damn Thing"	0.7/10	April 2, 2025	4.77
Saiounia was furious with Cedrek for keeping Bianca’s lost vote from her. On day 12, treemail announced the beginning of the game’s individual stage at Lagi’s camp. Everyone was tasked with finding an advantage for the upcoming challenge, which was found by Saiounia. Charity spread the word that Eva had an idol, but this led Eva’s allies to target Charity. David, Eva, Joe, Kyle, and Shauhin aligned with the hope to have honest, strong players in the end.: Reward Challenge: Divided into two teams of 6, players proceeded in pairs through a mud crawl to a mat, whereupon the next pair could go until all had gone through the crawl. They then navigated an over/under wood chip-filled obstacle and proceeded to a heavy bag of puzzle pieces. They untied the bag and hauled it up a rope ladder to the top of a platform and then down a slide. They then had to climb a sloped slide to the top of another platform where two team members solved a puzzle. The winning team earned a merge feast after the challenge. Saiounia’s advantage gave her a bye into the individual immunity challenge and allowed her to partake in the merge feast.; Immunity Challenge: Players had to balance a ball on a platform on a pole while periodically adding segments to the pole. The last one remaining won immunity and a merge buff.; Kyle won immunity. Charity and Saiounia pushed for Eva to go, but everyone else debated whether to send Charity or Saiounia home. At Tribal Council, Saiounia voted Cedrek, but Charity was eliminated before the remaining 12 were officially merged.
695	7	"Survivor Smack Talk"	0.7/9	April 9, 2025	4.89
Cedrek was dumbfounded over receiving a vote, while Mitch was hurt that his ally Charity went home despite being told Saiounia would go. To regroup, Mitch bonded with Shauhin and Joe, though Joe was wary of Mitch’s threat level.: Reward/Immunity Challenge: Divided into two groups of 6 by random draw (orange was Chrissy, Eva, Joe, Mitch, Saiounia, and Star; purple was Cedrek, David, Kamilla, Kyle, Mary, and Shauhin), players gripped a bar that held up a bucket with 25% of their pregame weight. Letting the bucket drop broke a tile eliminating that player from the challenge. The last person on each team won immunity. The last to remain also won a food reward for their team. Both teams would vote someone out at tribal with the team losing reward voting first and the person voted out not making the jury.; Joe and David won immunity, with David winning group reward. The orange group (exiled to Civa) targeted Saiounia, but Chrissy grew concerned over how big a threat Mitch was. At Tribal Council, Chrissy publicly called out the “honesty and integrity” mindset of the group. Mitch played his Block a Vote against Saiounia, who was voted out unanimously. At purple, Shauhin was the decoy vote as everyone targeted Cedrek, who had no clear allies in the group. Kyle was worried that Shauhin would make a move on him and plotted with Kamilla to give David the perception that Shauhin had an idol. At Tribal Council, however, everyone stuck to their original plan of sending Cedrek to the jury.
696	8	"A Rift Between All of Us"	0.8/11	April 16, 2025	4.79
Noting David and Mary’s tight duo (with David wanting to add Mary to his "strong five" alliance), Shauhin tried to strengthen his relationship with Kamilla. Survivors were instructed via tree mail to pair up at camp prior to the challenge. The pairs were: Joe-Eva, Kyle-Chrissy, David-Mary, Shauhin-Kamilla, and Mitch-Star.: Reward/Immunity Challenge: The challenge consisted of 3 phases. The four advancing to Phase 3 won a reward of tacos and drinks. The overall winner received immunity. Phase 1: Pairs had to retrieve a step while crawling through a sand filled tunnel. They then had to dig up a second step and finally plant a flag back at their mat. The first three pairs to finish moved on. The two pairs eliminated were sent on a journey where their vote would be at stake. Star, Mitch, Shauhin, and Kamilla went on the journey. Phase 2: The teams used their steps to complete a puzzle staircase. They then had to cross a rope bridge using three planks they moved with them to cross and down a slide to their mat. The first two teams to reach their mat moved on. Chrissy and Kyle were eliminated. Phase 3: The final four had to hang on to a tall pole as long as possible; Eva won immunity. At the reward, Eva was able to retrieve a small scroll she found in the chips without anyone noticing. The scroll said she could sneakily retrieve an advantage the next night: Journey Challenge: The journey challenge consisted of a long tray holding gray and red balls, with many more gray balls than red. The contestants took turns selecting either one or two balls at a time and putting them in their own tray. The first person to get three red balls in their tray lost their vote. Kamilla and Mitch worked together to ensure Star lost her vote.; David and Mary targeted Kamilla, but Joe wanted Chrissy gone when he learned she threw his name out. Kyle also tried to save Kamilla, leading to conflict with David. At Tribal Council, Chrissy continued to actively campaign against the “strong alliance”, which David pushed back against. Ultimately, the entire tribe came together to send Chrissy to the jury.
697	9	"Welcome to the Party"	0.6/9	April 23, 2025	4.58
David continued to target Kamilla, so Kyle cut ties with David. David also offended Joe by saying Joe went back on his word. Eva snuck out that night to retrieve the advantage her scroll told her about, but Shauhin noticed and alerted Joe. Eva was given an extra vote but could risk it for a 50-50 chance at Safety Without Power. She earned the Safety Without Power and could risk that for a 1-in-3 chance at an idol, but she chose to keep the Safety Without Power and told her allies about it. Despite her wariness of David’s paranoia, Eva hoped to keep her alliance together.: Reward/Immunity Challenge: Standing on a platform, survivors held on to a bar that was attached to an overhead chute that placed pressure on a ball preventing it from rolling down. If a contestant failed to hold the pressure causing their ball to drop, or if they stepped off the platform, they would be eliminated from the challenge. The last one standing won immunity and a feast.; Joe won and shared reward with Mitch, Eva, and Shauhin. Mary and David convinced Star to target Mitch out of fear that Kamilla had an advantage, but Joe, Eva, and Kyle considered betraying David due to his pushiness. At Tribal Council, a shocked and angry David was sent to the jury.
698	10	"My Enemies Are Plottin'"	0.7/9	April 30, 2025	4.59
Kamilla, Mary, Mitch, and Star aligned to counter the remaining “strong” alliance members, but Mitch was wary of Mary and Star for voting him at the previous tribal. To Kyle’s dismay, Kamilla told him that Mary and Star wanted Joe out.: Reward Challenge: With their arms and legs tethered together, castaways had to snake their way across mounds in the sand holding a buoy in their mouth. Once at the end, they unlocked three rings to toss onto targets. The first person to land all their rings won a fried chicken and waffle reward at another island.; Kyle won and shared reward with Eva, Kamilla, and Shauhin in hopes that Joe would keep tabs on the others at camp. Joe told Mary why David was targeted and complimented her threat level, but Mary believed it was just jury management on Joe’s part.: Immunity Challenge: Castaways had to balance a wobbly table and place blocks spelling the word “immunity.” If their stack dropped, they had to restart. The first person to finish their stack and stand on the starting platform for three seconds won immunity.; Joe won his third immunity challenge. Mitch, deciding not to proceed with the minority alliance, advised Star to play her Shot in the Dark, while Kamilla was not receptive to a suggested move against Kyle. This forced Mary and Star to target each other; at Tribal Council, Kamilla and Mitch joined Star in voting Mary, but the others sent Star to the jury.
699	11	"Coconut Etiquette"	0.6/8	May 7, 2025	4.43
Journey: Survivors drew rocks and Eva drew the purple rock. In a timed challenge she stacked wooden tiles on a rotating disk while standing on a narrow board and using only her foot to rotate the disk. If she successfully stacked four levels, she retained her vote. If she stacked eight levels, she would win a Knowledge Is Power advantage. If she failed to get at least four levels, she would lose her vote.; Eva successfully stacked four levels but chose not to risk her vote for the advantage as she already had power in the game.: Reward/Immunity Challenge: Survivors pushed a survivor wheelbarrow over obstacles while balancing a vase containing a key and adding a second vase with key along the way. At the finish, they used the keys to unlock pieces to an arch word puzzle. The first to build the arch spelling "Unforgettable", won immunity and a food reward.; Kamilla won the challenge and chose Mitch and Eva to join her on reward. Knowing she was on the bottom, Mary publicly targeted Joe, telling Kyle he had no chance of winning the game unless Joe and Eva were separated. At tribal, however, Kyle remained loyal to his alliance and Mary was unanimously sent to the jury causing David to stand up with his arms crossed, staring at the remaining cast members.
700	12	"Icarus Time"	0.8/10	May 14, 2025	4.90
Reward Challenge: Survivors held on to handholds while lying on a steeply angled slide above the water. Every few minutes they moved down to the next smaller handhold. If they slipped off the slide, they were eliminated. The winner would get reward of burgers, fries, cheesecake, loved ones letters, and a night at Sanctuary.; Shauhin won the challenge and chose Joe and Kyle to join him at Sanctuary. Back at camp, Mitch and Kamilla targeted Joe with Shauhin as a backup. At Sanctuary, Shauhin pitched to Kyle that they blindside Eva to split up her and Joe. Once back at camp, Kyle told Kamilla a plan to throw Shauhin under the bus by telling Joe and Eva that Shauhin flipped.: Immunity Challenge: Survivors used a sandbag to knock a rope with a Gordian knot off a high platform. They used the rope and knot to snag a Y post and pull themselves across the sand while balancing on a barrel. They then crawled under a heavy net and untied a bag of balls used to navigate a winding maze dropping the balls into pockets along the way. The first to finish won immunity.; Joe came from behind to win his fourth immunity challenge. Afterward, Kamilla continued Kyle's lie by telling Joe and Eva that Shauhin had shown her an idol and had said "no one can sit at the end next to Joe". At tribal, Kyle's plan came to fruition, sending a shocked Shauhin to the jury.
701	13	"Only One of Yous Can Win"	0.7/9	May 21, 2025	4.56
Immunity/Reward Challenge: Survivors climbed up and down an angled net and crawled through a mud filled net tunnel. They then shot a ball through a hoop that fed the ball into a sandbag filled net tunnel. The contestants moved the ball through the tunnel and then tossed the ball into a basket that raised a series of numbers that were used to unlock a key. They then ran up a steep ramp and unlocked a puzzle. The first to finish won immunity and reward.; In a massive comeback, Kamilla won and chose Eva to go with her to Sanctuary. Mitch was the clear target and was sent to the jury unanimously at Tribal. The next morning, Kyle and Kamilla agreed that they could not sit next to each other at the end, with Kyle promising Joe that he would take him if he won.: Final Immunity Challenge: With one hand tied to their side, survivors dropped a ball into a spiral rack. They had to catch the ball at the bottom and drop it in again. At intervals, they added another ball, and then another so multiple balls were going at all times. If a ball dropped, they were eliminated.; Kyle won the challenge. He kept his promise to Joe, pitting Eva against Kamilla in the firemaking challenge. Eva had an episode after struggling to make fire, leading Joe to comfort her and Kyle to consider going to fire himself against Kamilla. However, he stuck to his original choice.: Fire Making Challenge: Eva was the first to get flame and it turned into no contest as Eva's fire burned through before Kamilla ever got a flame.; At the Final Tribal Council, the jury saw Joe and Eva as having played the same game, while Kyle highlighted his genuine relationships with everyone while playing a more strategic game behind the scenes. When Eva tried to take credit for the Shauhin vote, Kamilla asked for Kyle's perspective; Kyle revealed his plot to betray Shauhin, which impressed the jury. They ultimately awarded Kyle the victory; Eva received Mary and Star's votes to place second, while Joe received Cedrek's vote to place third.

== Voting history ==
Survivor 48 voting history
	Original tribes						Switched tribes			No tribes	Merged tribe								
Episode	1	2	3				4		5	6	7		8	9	10	11	12	13	
Day	3	5	7				9		11	13	14 (Note: On Day 14, a split Tribal Council was held. The castaways were divided into two groups of six; each group went to Tribal Council separately to eliminate one castaway from each.)		15	17	19	21	23	24	25
Tribe	Vula	Vula	Vula				Vula		Civa	None	Niu Nai	Niu Nai	Niu Nai	Niu Nai	Niu Nai	Niu Nai	Niu Nai	Niu Nai	Niu Nai
Eliminated	Stephanie	Kevin	None (Note: Mary successfully played her Shot in the Dark; therefore, both votes against her did not count. As there were no counted ballots, and Justin was not eligible to cast a vote, both eligible castaways then re-voted between those who weren't immune.)	Tie (Note: The vote resulted in a tie. Per the rules, a second vote was held. As one of the castaways involved in the tie had lost voting privileges, all the remaining castaways with votes were eligible to vote for those players who tied.)	Tie (Note: After three rounds of voting, Tribal Council remained tied. Normally, per the rules, the non-tied castaways who had the ability to vote must come to a unanimous decision as to whom to eliminate between the tied castaways, however Cedrek is the sole castaway with a vote and not voted for in the tie.)	Justin	Thomas		Bianca	Charity	Saiounia	Cedrek	Chrissy	David	Star	Mary	Shauhin	Mitch	Kamilla
Votes	4–1	3–0 (Note: Saiounia played a hidden immunity idol on herself; therefore, one vote for her was not counted.)	0–0	1–1	1–1	Consensus (Note: Due to a deadlocked tie, the only non-tied castaway eligible to vote, Cedrek, had to come to a consensus decision by himself to vote out either Justin or Saiounia, or else he would be eliminated without a rock draw. Cedrek decided to eliminate Justin.)	3–0 (Note: Kyle played a hidden immunity idol on himself; therefore, three votes for him were not counted.)		2–1–1	7–5–1	5–0	5–1	8–1	6–3	5–3	6–1	4–2	4–1	None (Note: For winning the final Immunity Challenge, Kyle had to assign additional immunity to another player, with the remaining two competing in a fire-making challenge to determine the third finalist; he gave additional immunity to Joe, and Eva defeated Kamilla in the fire-making challenge.)
Voter	Vote																		Challenge
Kyle							Thomas	Thomas (Note: This player played an extra vote advantage, allowing them to cast two ballots during a single vote.)		Charity		Cedrek	Chrissy	David	Star	Mary	Shauhin	Mitch	Immune
Eva										Saiounia	Saiounia		Chrissy	David	Star	Mary	Shauhin	Mitch	Won
Joe							~~Kyle~~			Charity	Saiounia		Chrissy	David	Star	Mary	Shauhin	Mitch	Saved
Kamilla							Thomas			Charity		Cedrek	Chrissy	David	Mary	Mary	Mitch	Mitch	Lost
Mitch									Saiounia	Saiounia	Saiounia		Chrissy	David	Mary	Mary	Shauhin	Kyle	
Shauhin							~~Kyle~~			Saiounia		Cedrek	Chrissy	David	Star	Mary	Mitch		
Mary	Saiounia	None (Note: This player lost a vote attempting to gain an advantage.)	None (Note: This player played the Shot in the Dark, and as a result, had to sacrifice that night's vote.)							Charity		Cedrek	Chrissy	Mitch	Star	Joe			
Star										Charity	Saiounia		None (Note: For coming last in the immunity challenge, Kamilla, Mitch, Shauhin, and Star lost their votes. However, Kamilla, Mitch, and Shauhin regained theirs.)	Mitch	Mary				
David										Saiounia		Cedrek	Chrissy	Mitch					
Chrissy									Bianca	Charity	Saiounia		Shauhin						
Cedrek	Stephanie	Kevin	~~Mary~~	Saiounia	Saiounia	Justin			Bianca	Charity		Shauhin							
Saiounia	Stephanie	Kevin	~~Mary~~	Justin	Justin (Note: Per the rules, if a tied vote between castaways occurs, and one of the castaways in the tie does not have a vote to begin with, their votes do not cancel each other out, and all castaways eligible to vote still retain voting power within the revote(s), although Saiounia could only vote for Justin in the third round of voting.)	None			Chrissy	Cedrek	None (Note: This player lost their vote as another player used a block a vote advantage.)								
Charity										Saiounia									
Bianca									None										
Thomas							~~Kyle~~												
Justin	Stephanie	Kevin	None																
Kevin	Stephanie	~~Saiounia~~																	
Stephanie	None																		

Jury vote
Episode	13		
Day	26		
Finalist	Kyle	Eva	Joe
Votes	5–2–1		
Juror	Vote		
Kamilla	Yes		
Mitch	Yes		
Shauhin	Yes		
Mary		Yes	
Star		Yes	
David	Yes		
Chrissy	Yes		
Cedrek			Yes

== Production ==
On December 15, 2023, Manoa Kamikamica, the Fijian Minister of Commerce, Trade, Tourism and Transport, announced that the Fijian Parliament had renewed its contract with Survivor for an additional two years. A preview for the season was released on December 18, 2024, right after the finale of Survivor 47 aired. Survivor 48 and The Amazing Race 37 retain the 90-minute runtime; the premiere episode of Survivor 48 ran for two hours.

== Reception ==
Despite Jeff Probst calling it "one of [his] all-time favorite seasons", Survivor 48 was not well-received by fans or critics. Dalton Ross of Entertainment Weekly ranked the season 26th out of 48, citing several episodes where not much happened but praising the pre-merge and the dynamic between Kyle and Kamilla. Nick Caruso of TVLine ranked this season 33rd out of 48. Andy Dehnart of reality blurred wrote that "great people alone do not make for great strategic competition reality television. And when there are 90-minute episodes, sometimes only one challenge that's so generic it blends together with all the other challenges, and producer meddling in the form of journeys and advantages that go nowhere, you have a recipe for a dull entry into the 48-season history of this great show." Brian Moylan of Vulture called it a lackluster season with a satisfying ending. Cher Thompson of Screen Rant called the season lackluster and boring. Julien D'Alessandro of Collider called it "one of the more boring seasons in recent memory". Mack Rawden of CinemaBlend wrote, "It had some moments here and there, but best case scenario, it's near the bottom of the New Era rankings. I didn't like it." Matt Hambidge of FandomWire wrote, "Survivor 48 was a wildly frustrating season. A fairly strong start, followed by a rough post-merge. It really wasn't until the penultimate episode that things got moving, and that is far too late to fully save a season. It's enough to keep it out of the bottom of the new era seasons, but that’s about it."

Viewership and ratings per episode of Survivor 48
No.	Title	Air date	Rating/share (18–49)	Viewers (millions)	DVR (18–49)	DVR viewers (millions)	Total (18–49)	Total viewers (millions)	Ref.
1	"The Get to Know You Game"	February 26, 2025	0.7/9	4.27	0.3	1.77	1.0	6.04	
2	"Humble Traits"	March 5, 2025	0.6/8	4.31	0.3	1.42	0.8	5.73	
3	"Committing to the Bit"	March 12, 2025	0.7/9	4.63	0.2	1.38	0.9	6.02	
4	"The House Party’s Over"	March 19, 2025	0.8/10	4.70	0.2	1.36	1.0	6.06	
5	"Master Class in Deception"	March 26, 2025	0.7/10	4.77	0.2	1.29	0.9	6.06	
6	"Doing the Damn Thing"	April 2, 2025	0.7/10	4.77	TBD	TBD	TBD	TBD	
7	"Survivor Smack Talk"	April 9, 2025	0.7/9	4.89	TBD	TBD	TBD	TBD	
8	"A Rift Between All of Us"	April 16, 2025	0.8/11	4.79	TBD	TBD	TBD	TBD	
9	"Welcome to the Party"	April 23, 2025	0.6/9	4.58	TBD	TBD	TBD	TBD	
10	"My Enemies Are Plottin'"	April 30, 2025	0.7/9	4.59	TBD	TBD	TBD	TBD	
11	"Coconut Etiquette"	May 7, 2025	0.6/8	4.43	TBD	TBD	TBD	TBD	
12	"Icarus Time"	May 14, 2025	0.8/10	4.90	TBD	TBD	TBD	TBD	
13	"Only One of Yous Can Win"	May 21, 2025	0.7/9	4.56	TBD	TBD	TBD	TBD	
