= Survivor 46 =

- Season 46
- Presented by: Jeff Probst
- No. of days: 26
- No. of castaways: 18
- Winner: Kenzie Petty
- Runner-up: Charlie Davis
- Location: Mamanuca Islands, Fiji
- No. of episodes: 13

Release
- Original network: CBS
- Original release: February 28 – May 22, 2024

Additional information
- Filming dates: June 3 – June 28, 2023

Season chronology
- ← Previous; Survivor 45 Next → Survivor 47

Survivor 46 is the forty-sixth season of the American competitive reality television series Survivor. It premiered on February 28, 2024, on CBS in the United States, and was the fourteenth consecutive season to be filmed in the Mamanuca Islands in Fiji.

The season ended on May 22, 2024, when Kenzie Petty was crowned the winner, defeating Charlie Davis and Ben Katzman in a 5–3–0 jury vote.

== Format ==
Survivor is a reality television show based on the Swedish show Expedition Robinson, created by Mark Burnett and Charlie Parsons. The series follows a number of participants isolated in a remote location, where they must provide food, fire, and shelter. One by one, a participant is removed from the series by majority vote, with challenges held to give a reward (ranging from living- and food-related prizes to a car) and immunity from being voted out of the series. The last remaining player receives a prize of $1,000,000.

== Contestants ==
Cast of Survivor 46. Eventual winner Kenzie Petty seen at the left of the front row of the left group (Yanu).

The cast of 18 contestants was announced on February 5, 2024. Notable castaways this season include former BET on-air personality Tiffany Nicole (also known as Tiffany Ervin).

List of Survivor 46 contestants
Contestant	Age	From	Tribe			Finish	
Contestant	Age	From	Original	None	Merged	Placement	Day
David Jelinsky	21	Las Vegas, Nevada	Yanu			1st voted out	Day 3
Jess Chong	37	San Francisco, California	Yanu			2nd voted out	Day 5
Randen Montalvo	40	Orlando, Florida	Nami			Medically evacuated	Day 7
Bhanu Gopal	40	Acton, Massachusetts	Yanu			3rd voted out	Day 9
Jemila "Jem" Hussain-Adams	31	Chicago, Illinois	Siga			4th voted out	Day 11
Moriah Gaynor	28	San Diego, California	Siga	None (Note: At the start of the individual phase of the game on Day 12, players had to earn their way into the merged tribe by either winning immunity or surviving the Day 13 Tribal Council.)		5th voted out	Day 13
Tim Spicer	30	Atlanta, Georgia	Siga	None	Nuinui	6th voted out	Day 14
Sodasia "Soda" Thompson	27	Lake Hopatcong, New Jersey	Nami	None	Nuinui	7th voted out 1st jury member	Day 14
Tevin Davis	24	Richmond, Virginia	Nami	None	Nuinui	8th voted out 2nd jury member	Day 16
Hunter McKnight	27	French Camp, Mississippi	Nami	None	Nuinui	9th voted out 3rd jury member	Day 17
Tiffany Nicole Ervin	32	Elizabeth, New Jersey	Yanu	None	Nuinui	10th voted out 4th jury member	Day 19
Venus Vafa	24	Toronto, Ontario	Nami	None	Nuinui	11th voted out 5th jury member	Day 21
Quintavius "Q" Burdette	29	Senatobia, Mississippi	Yanu	None	Nuinui	12th voted out 6th jury member	Day 23
Maria Shrime Gonzalez	47	Dallas, Texas	Siga	None	Nuinui	13th voted out 7th jury member	Day 24
Liz Wilcox	35	Orlando, Florida	Nami	None	Nuinui	Eliminated; 8th jury member	Day 25
Ben Katzman	31	Miami, Florida	Siga	None	Nuinui	2nd runner-up	Day 26
Charlie Davis	25	Boston, Massachusetts	Siga	None	Nuinui	Runner-up	Day 26
Kenzie Petty	28	Charlotte, North Carolina	Yanu	None	Nuinui	Sole Survivor	Day 26

=== Future appearances ===
Q Burdette, Charlie Davis, and Tiffany Nicole Ervin returned to compete on Survivor 50: In the Hands of the Fans.

Outside of Survivor, Venus Vafa competed on the third season of The Traitors Canada. In 2027, Burdette competed on the sixth season of The Traitors.

== Season summary ==
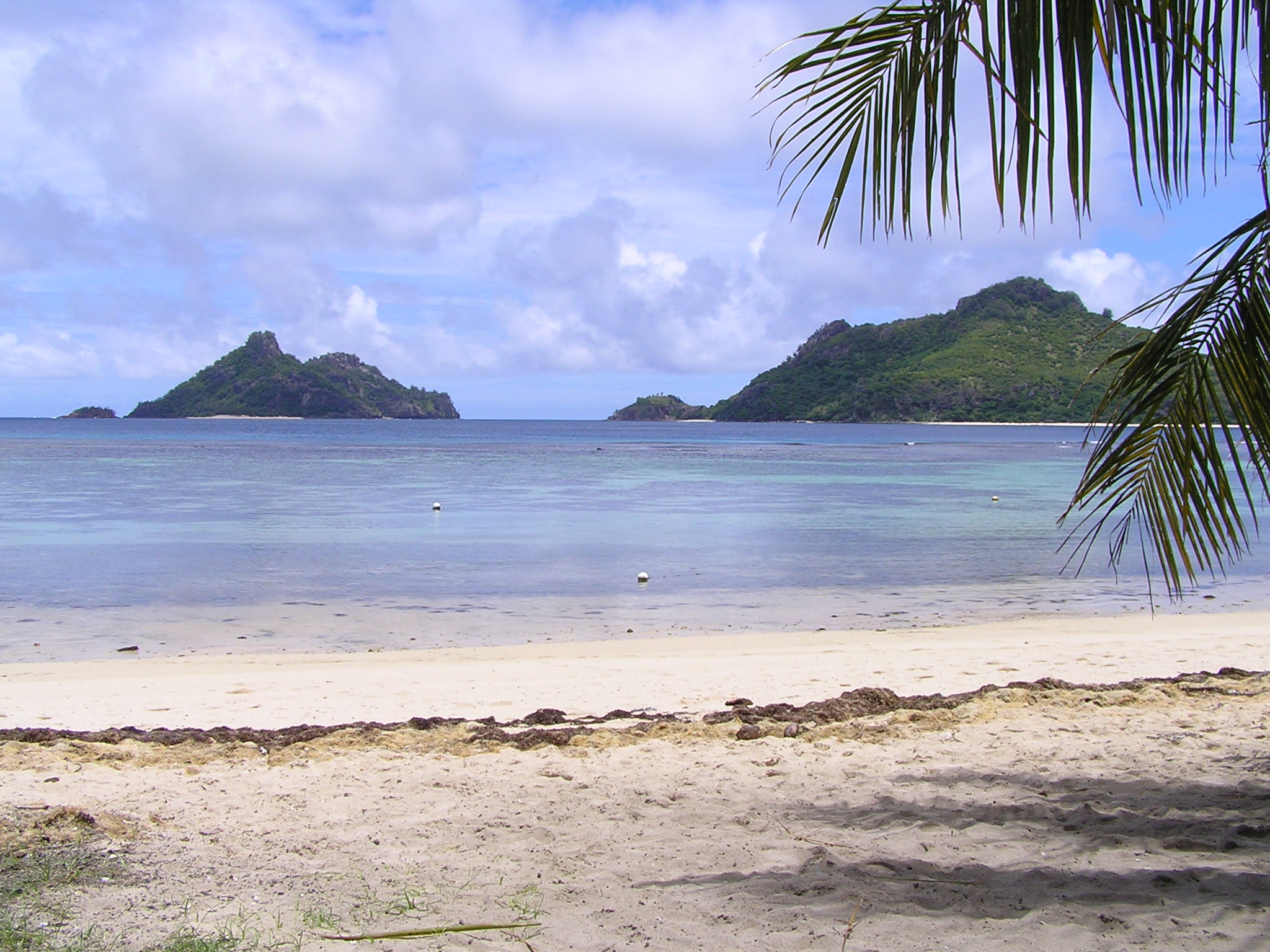
The season filmed in the Mamanuca Islands of Fiji.

Eighteen new castaways were divided into three tribes of six: Nami, Siga, and Yanu. Yanu fared the worst in challenges, leaving only Kenzie, Tiffany, and Q. Siga was spearheaded by a strong alliance and friendship of Charlie and Maria, who eliminated Jem with an idol in her pocket. Nami went undefeated in challenges, but the mistrust throughout the tribe hindered their ability to stay united.

Before the merge, Hunter, Tim and Q met together on a journey and decided to join forces at the merge, with each of the men choosing an ally from their tribe (Tevin, Maria, and Tiffany, respectively) to join them and form a majority, called the 6. However, Maria defected from them, joining Charlie and the others in eliminating the 6 and other major threats (including Hunter, Tiffany, Venus, and Q also getting voted out with idols.)

At the final six, Charlie and Maria turned on each other. Charlie prevailed, and he, Kenzie and Ben made it to the final three. Kenzie was praised for her social game while Charlie was commended for his strategic prowess. In the end, Kenzie won in a 5–3–0 vote over Charlie and Ben, respectively.

Survivor 46 season summary
Episode			Challenge winner(s)		Journey	Eliminated	
No.	Title	Air date	Reward	Immunity	Journey	Tribe	Player
1	"This is Where the Legends Are Made"	February 28, 2024	Nami	Nami	Jelinsky (Yanu)	Yanu	Jelinsky
1	"This is Where the Legends Are Made"	February 28, 2024	Nami	Nami	Maria (Siga)	Yanu	Jelinsky
1	"This is Where the Legends Are Made"	February 28, 2024	Nami	Siga	Tevin (Nami)	Yanu	Jelinsky
2	"Scorpio Energy"	March 6, 2024	Nami		None	Yanu	Jess
2	"Scorpio Energy"	March 6, 2024	Siga		None	Yanu	Jess
3	"Wackadoodles Win"	March 13, 2024	Nami		Ben (Siga)	Nami (Note: Yanu was saved from going to Tribal Council because Randen was medically evacuated from the game.)	Randen
3	"Wackadoodles Win"	March 13, 2024	Nami		Bhanu (Yanu)	Nami	Randen
3	"Wackadoodles Win"	March 13, 2024	Siga		Liz (Nami)	Nami	Randen
4	"Don't Touch the Oven"	March 20, 2024	Yanu	Nami	None	Yanu	Bhanu
4	"Don't Touch the Oven"	March 20, 2024	Nami	Siga	None	Yanu	Bhanu
5	"Tiki Man"	March 27, 2024	Nami		Hunter (Nami)	Siga	Jem
5	"Tiki Man"	March 27, 2024	Nami		Q (Yanu)	Siga	Jem
5	"Tiki Man"	March 27, 2024	Yanu		Tim (Siga)	Siga	Jem
6	"Cancel Christmas"	April 3, 2024	Ben, Hunter, Kenzie, Q, Tevin, Tim [Tiffany] (Note: Tiffany did not participate in the challenge after picking the odd rock, but she correctly guessed the winning team and, as a result, was also immune and joined them on the reward.)		None	None	Moriah
7	"Episode Several"	April 10, 2024	Maria [Charlie, Liz, Soda, Tevin, Venus] (Note: In addition to immunity, Maria won reward for her entire team for lasting the longest in the challenge.)	Kenzie	None	Nuinui	Tim
7	"Episode Several"	April 10, 2024	Maria [Charlie, Liz, Soda, Tevin, Venus]	Maria	None	Nuinui	Soda
8	"Hide 'N Seek"	April 17, 2024	None	Hunter	None	Nuinui	Tevin
9	"Spicy Jeff"	April 24, 2024	None	Charlie	None	Nuinui	Hunter
10	"Run the Red Light"	May 1, 2024	Q [Kenzie, Maria, Tiffany]	Charlie	None	Nuinui	Tiffany
11	"My Messy, Sweet Little Friend"	May 8, 2024	Maria [Ben, Q] (Note: In addition to immunity, Maria won reward for herself and two other castaways of her choice; she chose Ben and Q.)	Maria	None	Nuinui	Venus
12	"Mamma Bear"	May 15, 2024	Charlie [Kenzie, Liz]	Maria	None	Nuinui	Q
13	"Friends Going to War"	May 22, 2024	Kenzie [Ben] (Note: In addition to immunity, Kenzie won reward for herself and one other castaway of her choice; she chose Ben.)	Kenzie	None	Nuinui	Maria
13	"Friends Going to War"	May 22, 2024	None	Ben (Note: For winning the final Immunity Challenge, Ben had to assign additional immunity to another player, with the remaining two competing in a fire-making challenge to determine the third finalist; he gave additional immunity to Charlie.) [Charlie]	None	Nuinui	Liz

== Episodes ==
No. overall	No. in season	Title	Rating/share (18–49)	Original release date	U.S. viewers (millions)
662	1	"This is Where the Legends are Made"	0.83/9	February 28, 2024	4.90
The 18 new castaways began their adventure.: Marooning Challenge: In pairs, tribe members raced under a cargo net and tunneled through sand underneath a wooden beam before collecting large puzzle pieces and returning to the starting mat. Once every member collected their piece, tribes used them to build a three-dimensional block puzzle, which they stood on top of to retrieve a stick of flint off a tall pole. The first tribe to finish won the flint and other supplies, while the second tribe to finish had their choice of either a "Savvy" or "Sweat" challenge to compete for their supplies, leaving the last tribe with the other option.; Nami won the challenge. Siga, the second tribe to finish, chose Savvy leaving Yanu with the Sweat Challenge.: Supply Challenge: At Siga, Ben and Charlie were chosen for Savvy, which was a word scramble puzzle. At Yanu, Jelinsky and Q were chosen to do Sweat, which was to haul sea water to fill a container using buckets that had holes in them. The back and forth was tough for both, and Jelinsky decided to quit with more than half their time left. Ben and Charlie also failed at the Savvy word scramble puzzle.; At Nami, Venus was caught by Randen after trying to find an idol, as he thought she was being sneaky. During Day 2, the tribes had to choose one person to go on a journey.: Journey: Jelinsky from Yanu volunteered. Siga chose Maria, and Nami chose Tevin. The three were taken to a beach where they had to draw a card and try to convince the torch cardholder they were holding the vote card. Maria drew the torch card. Jelinsky, who had the skull, tried to convince Maria but gave up quickly and forfeited his vote at the upcoming Tribal Council. Maria and Tevin gained an extra vote advantage.; Immunity Challenge: Tribes raced up a ramp to untie a giant 500-pound dummy gecko, lifting it up and over a barricade before dragging it through a tunnel and hauling it to the top of a platform, clasping it into place. Once at the top, tribes unlocked puzzle pieces, which they used to build a large Survivor 46 puzzle. The first two tribes to finish won immunity, while the losing tribe had to forfeit their flint.; Nami and Siga won immunity. At camp, Jess shared she wasn't confident in her performance in the game. Jelinsky feigned nervousness but still felt confident that he would stay. Tiffany then found a Beware Advantage and solved the clue for the location of the key to unlock a hidden immunity idol. At Tribal Council, while tribe members spoke about difficulties connecting socially with Jess, they voted unanimously for Jelinsky to be the first person eliminated from the game.
663	2	"Scorpio Energy"	0.61/7	March 6, 2024	4.43
Bhanu confided in Kenzie that he did not feel secure in the game. Meanwhile, Q and Tiffany were concerned about Kenzie's threat level because she easily made connections with people. At Nami, tribemates felt they couldn't connect with Venus. At Siga, Ben successfully made fire to the delight of everyone. Tim was concerned about Maria's extra vote advantage. While having an alliance with the women, Charlie and Maria made a strong pair together, effectively putting the two of them in the middle. Back at Nami, both Venus and Randen felt unsafe so they went on idol searches, and Randen found the Beware Advantage. He also approached Venus for an alliance. At Yanu, when Kenzie pulled Jess and Bhanu for a chat where she thought to take out Q and Tiffany, Jess saw this as an opportunity and told Q about the plan, which made him become even more cautious with Kenzie as an ally.: Reward/Immunity Challenge: One tribe member cut a rope, releasing two wheels before attaching it to a wagon. Tribes pushed the wagon to a sandpit, where they dug up two chests and loaded them on the wagon. Tribes then ran through a zig-zag path and used the puzzle pieces inside the chests to spell the word "persistence" in a freestanding arch. The first two tribes to spell the word correctly with no pieces falling won immunity and fishing gear (a large kit for first place and a smaller kit for second place), while the losing tribe had to forfeit their flint.; After the grueling puzzle, Yanu lost again. Despite Nami's win, Venus was angry because the wagon was dragged over her toe. At Yanu, tribemates were concerned that Jess would play her Shot in the Dark, so they made a fake idol. Tiffany tried to direct Jess to the location of their fake idol, but she didn't see it. Q devised a plan to sneak it to her directly instead. Jess was worried at first, so she talked to Tiffany about voting Kenzie out, but Tiffany recognized her plan. At Tribal Council, a paranoid Bhanu whispered to Kenzie and Tiffany, but Jess was sent home after playing the fake idol.
664	3	"Wackadoodles Win"	0.75/9	March 13, 2024	4.78
Despite being saved, Bhanu still felt paranoid, though Q gave him a pep talk. At Siga, Jem discovered a Beware Advantage. At Nami, Venus targeted Hunter, feeling he had the most social connections out of everyone on the tribe. Meanwhile, Randen woke up having the medic check him out as he felt numb on one side of his body and was unable to move his hand.: Reward/Immunity Challenge: Tribes raced out into the water and swim through a series of obstacles (a net crawl, a barrel roll and crate staircase) before moving back to the beach where they had to dig for a sack of beanbags. The first two tribes to toss all of their beanbags onto a spiral platform won immunity and both small and large tool kits respectively, while the losing tribe had to forfeit their flint.; Yanu lost yet another challenge. Jeff then informed the tribes that they would be sending one member for a journey. For placing first, Nami chose the participants; Liz from Nami, Ben from Siga, and Bhanu from Yanu went.: Journey: Bhanu broke down and disclosed all of Yanu's dynamics to Ben and Liz. The challenge began with each player picking a rock, with the two who pulled blue rocks from the bag competing in a timed puzzle. Ben and Bhanu were the two competing, but both were unable to complete it in the time limit, so they both lost their vote in the next Tribal Council.; At Yanu, Tiffany and Kenzie talked Q out of falling on his sword due to his poor tossing segment. Coming back from the journey, Bhanu kept quiet with his tribemates that he lost his vote. He decided to let Q know, and Q considered keeping Bhanu rather than a social threat like Kenzie. Before Tribal Council, Jeff showed up at the Nami camp, sharing that the medics who had checked out Randen earlier were concerned with the way his condition seemed to be progressing, and thus he was medically evacuated from the game. As a result, Yanu's Tribal Council was cancelled.
665	4	"Don't Touch the Oven"	0.78/9	March 20, 2024	4.68
Tribemates were disappointed with how Bhanu had confessed to Ben and Liz about the dynamics of the Yanu tribe. Day 8's treemail alluded to a reward challenge for food, which Yanu hoped to trade for an earlier reward.: Reward Challenge: Tribes paddled boats through the water, untying a key which they used once ashore to unlock rings and remove them from a tall pole. Once completed, members tunneled under a wooden beam and attempted to throw the rings back onto another pole. The first two tribes to finish won ten and five fishes respectively, along with means to prepare them.; Yanu and Nami won the challenge. From Yanu, Q tried to train Bhanu on how to be more strategic and spill less information. At Siga, Maria found the locked box and the whole tribe dug, to no avail. Jem convinced Maria and Moriah that Tim was hiding the Beware Advantage from them. At Nami, Tevin became concerned about Soda's social prowess, so he suggested to Hunter and Liz that they vote her out if they lost the immunity challenge.: Immunity Challenge: One at a time, tribe members climbed a cargo net and leaped into the ocean before scaling a stack of crates and jumping in again. Two members from each tribe then dove down during their turn to release buoys. Once every member had swum to the end, one member attempted to throw three buoys into basket targets. The first two tribes to finish won immunity, while the losing tribe had to forfeit their flint.; Yanu fell short once again. Knowing he was to go home that night, Bhanu tried to find an idol, but came up empty. At Tribal Council, Bhanu shared his life story and was comforted by his tribemates before being sent home without a formal vote.
666	5	"Tiki Man"	0.70/8	March 27, 2024	4.72
Yanu lamented their continued losing status, and Q hinted to Kenzie that he wanted out of the game, but it was a ruse to make her feel comfortable enough to not play her Shot in the Dark. At Nami, Venus kept watch over Hunter as he searched for an advantage, but he was able to find the re-hidden Beware Advantage without her noticing. At Siga, Tim believed that Jem was the one who moved the Beware Advantage, but she denied it.: Reward/Immunity Challenge: One at a time, tribe members raced through a three tiered obstacle course, collecting bags with keys along the way, one of which they used when all members had finished to release a hook and drop a sack full of sandbags. Afterwards, every member used a slingshot to launch sandbags at faraway targets. The first two tribes to finish won immunity and large and small pastry and fruit rewards respectively, while the losing tribe had to forfeit their flint.; Nami placed first yet again and Yanu finally broke their losing streak. Hunter, Tim and Q were picked to go on a journey.: Journey: The men discussed a final six strategy in which they each picked a plus-one. They then agreed on Hunter competing in the challenge, arranging twenty Survivor logos in chronological order within a certain amount of time, but he failed and lost his vote.; At Siga, the women targeted Ben. Jem followed the Beware Advantage's note to an idol. Her method of convincing Ben and Tim she was on their side only made them distrust her more. Charlie and Maria were in the middle; Charlie hoped to work with Ben, as they had grown close, but Maria wanted to work with the women. At Tribal Council, they sided with the men and blindsided Jem with an idol in her possession, using Maria's extra vote to do so.
667	6	"Cancel Christmas"	0.80/9	April 3, 2024	5.05
On Day 12, the tribes were notified that the individual phase of the game was to commence. Hunter found Nami's idol before Siga and Yanu were brought in. Yanu realized they were in the middle; Siga targeted Venus while Nami targeted Moriah.: Reward/Immunity Challenge: Divided into groups of six by random draw, with one odd member waging their safety on the outcome of the challenge, teammates raced under a muddied cargo net to a cart, which they maneuvered over obstacles, collecting sandbags along the way which they piled to access a tall platform. One member untied a bag of keys, which they used after descending a rope net and scaling a large boulder to unlock chests full of puzzle pieces and complete a circular puzzle. The first team to finish won immunity, the merged tribe buffs and a merge feast, while the losing team would be vulnerable at the next Tribal Council.; Ben, Hunter, Kenzie, Q, Tevin, and Tim won the challenge. Tiffany also won due to correctly predicting them to win. The Yanu three correctly deduced that Siga was the tighter tribe and hoped to break that alliance up. At Tribal Council, Moriah disclosed that she was on the bottom of the Siga vote, which led everyone to distrust her since she had earlier said that vote was unanimous. She played her Shot in the Dark which failed, and only Charlie had voted Venus while everyone else voted out Moriah.
668	7	"Episode Several"	0.69/8	April 10, 2024	4.64
Charlie admitted to voting Venus, to Q's chagrin. During the night, Ben had a panic attack and was comforted by Kenzie.: Reward/Immunity Challenge: Castaways, divided into two teams of six by random draw, balanced on floating A-frames, moving up onto narrower footholds after regular intervals. If a castaway fell off the platform or touched the structure they would be eliminated from the challenge. The longest lasting castaway from each group won immunity, while the longest lasting castaway overall won coffee, sandwiches and pastries for their team, along with the advantage of going to Tribal Council second.; Ben, Hunter, Kenzie, Q, Tiffany, and Tim made up one group; Charlie, Liz, Maria, Soda, Tevin, and Venus made up the other group. Kenzie and Maria won immunity, with Maria winning reward for her group. The Yanu three were in the middle, but Q's bossiness and penchant for flip-flopping in his decision-making earned Kenzie and Tiffany's distrust. At Tribal Council, the Yanu three and Hunter voted out Tim. With the other group, Charlie was seemingly the easy target for the Nami four, but Tevin hoped to blindside Soda. Maria felt more inclined to vote out Venus, but at Tribal Council, everyone followed Tevin's lead and sent Soda to the jury, though Tevin himself voted Venus.
669	8	"Hide 'N Seek"	0.77/9	April 17, 2024	4.84
Venus took credit for Soda's blindside, but Liz also claimed she wanted Soda out from the beginning. The next morning, Q asked Charlie if he wanted to join the alliance of six established at the journey. Later, Tiffany suggested to Tevin that they include Maria as a potential target; Tevin brought this to Q's attention, causing Q to want to blindside Tiffany.: Immunity Challenge: Castaways held onto a tall pole using footholds for as long as they could. If they touched the ground, they would be eliminated from the challenge. The last remaining castaway won immunity.; Jeff offered a large bag of rice if four people sat out or if two sacrificed their votes. Though Q and Liz were willing to sit out, no one else wanted to. Hunter won the challenge, and Q was frustrated since multiple people lasted very little time in the challenge when they could have sat out for the rice. At camp, multiple people were on board with the plan against Tiffany, but Liz started rallying people against Tevin. That plan circled back to Q, and at Tribal Council, Q asked to be voted out since he felt responsible for someone else's dream ending due to the shifting in plans. This caused a live Tribal during which Tevin and Hunter tried to switch the plan to the easy vote in Venus, but everyone else joined Liz's plan to send Tevin to the jury.
670	9	"Spicy Jeff"	0.74/8	April 24, 2024	4.91
The fallout of the previous Tribal Council led to everyone being furious with Q for his antics, with Tiffany severing ties with Q completely after he revealed that she had an immunity idol. The next day, tree mail revealed that the final nine must split into teams of three.: Immunity Challenge: The nine remaining survivors were broken up into three teams of three each. The immunity challenge was run in three stages. For the first stage, one at a time, players crossed a hinged balance beam and grabbed a pair of handles. They then used the handles to transfer a buoy across a second zig zag balance beam. Once everyone was across, they worked together to dig up three rope rungs. The first two teams to finish moved on to the second stage. In the second stage, teams used the rope rungs to build a bridge. Once everyone was across, they each had to land a ball on a ring mounted on a pole. The first group to finish moved on to the third stage where they competed against each other for individual immunity. Stage three consisted of the players standing on a narrow ledge with their hands holding onto a handle behind their head. If a hand or foot came off the handle or ledge, that player was out. The last player still on their perch, won immunity.; Team purple had Maria, Hunter, and Charlie. Team orange had Kenzie, Ben, and Tiffany. Team green had Q, Liz, and Venus. Team orange was eliminated in the first stage. Team green lost in the second stage. Hunter, Maria and Charlie then went head-to-head in stage three with Charlie outlasting Hunter to win immunity. Back at camp, Kenzie tried to rally a blindside against her ally Tiffany so the idol could be flushed out, but Charlie got spooked when Tiffany threatened to play it so she would not be burdened by it. Instead, Charlie suggested voting out Hunter, who did not have immunity and was seen as a physical threat in future challenges. Even though Hunter vowed to play his idol, he ultimately did not do so. This proved to be a fatal mistake after the vote was tied between him and Q, with Hunter being sent to the jury on the revote.
671	10	"Run the Red Light"	0.80/9	May 1, 2024	4.79
Liz was upset over being left out of the plan against Hunter, while Maria talked to Q about aligning.: Reward Challenge: Castaways traversed an obstacle course starting by jumping over a series of tables and crawling through obstacles. They then untied a bag of sandbags and tossed them into one end of a woven net tunnel and used their hands to pull them out the other end. Once all the sandbags were through the tunnel, they grabbed one last sandbag and crawled under a net. At the end of the course, they tossed the sandbag onto a small perch atop a high pole. The first person to land their sandbag won an Applebee’s feast at the Survivor Sanctuary.; Q won the challenge and chose to share reward with Tiffany, Maria, and Kenzie. Liz had a visceral meltdown over not being chosen, as she hadn't been able to eat much food on the island due to her allergies. While Q attempted to rebuild trust with Tiffany and Kenzie, neither were on board with realigning with Q.: Immunity Challenge: Castaways held a bar attached to an overhead bucket that contained 25% of their pregame body weight. If a castaway let their bucket drop, they were eliminated. The last person standing won immunity.; Jeff again offered rice if four people sat out, but later offered an individual portion of rice for each castaway who sat out. Liz took the individual rice. Charlie won his second straight immunity necklace. Though most of the tribe wanted Q gone, Maria looped in Charlie, Ben, and Q for a blindside against Tiffany before trying to convince Liz to join the plan. At Tribal Council, Maria's plan worked, and Tiffany was blindsided after not playing her idol.
672	11	"My Messy, Sweet Little Friend"	0.75/8	May 8, 2024	4.69
Maria’s threat level skyrocketed after orchestrating Tiffany’s blindside, and even Charlie mulled turning against her. Everyone searched for an idol the following morning, and Venus found it.: Reward/Immunity Challenge: Castaways balanced a ball on top of a pole while navigating over and under obstacles before adding more length to the pole and crossing a balance beam. Once at the end, they maneuvered two additional balls across a horizontal snake maze, attempting to drop them into two separate targets. The first to finish won immunity, as well as a pizza reward, which they were able to share with two other tribemates.; Maria won the challenge and chose to share reward with Ben; after being unable to choose between Q and Liz, the former won rock-paper-scissors to join them on reward, making the others livid. Q proposed that he and the Siga 3 vote out Venus, while those out of the reward targeted Q. Venus hinted to Charlie that she had “something up her sleeve”, which made him wary of trusting her. At Tribal Council, Venus became the third consecutive player sent to the jury with an idol going unplayed.
673	12	"Mamma Bear"	0.75/8	May 15, 2024	4.71
Ben admitted that he had voted Kenzie due to misunderstanding the vote, but their bond still persisted after Kenzie helped him through another sleepless night. The next morning, Charlie and Maria privately mulled turning against each other.: Reward Challenge: Castaways high-stepped through a wooden obstacle before untying a bag with a ball and guiding it on a rope through a horizontal ladder. Afterwards, they freed their bag and crawled under an obstacle to the finish, where they used it to complete a table maze. The first castaway to finish won a Chinese takeout reward with love letters from home.; Charlie won the challenge and chose to share reward with Liz and Kenzie. At camp, Q found a new hidden idol and told Maria about it. When Charlie and Maria reconvened, each believed the other to be loyal to them, though each were ready to vote the other out.: Immunity Challenge: Castaways climbed to the top of a tall tower in ocean and dove into the water, traversing a submerged rope bridge and crossing a balance beam before swimming to the end, where they raced to complete a dolphin block puzzle. The first castaway to finish won immunity.; Maria won the challenge convincingly, forcing Charlie to target Q instead. Liz and Kenzie hoped to vote out Q but kept their options open after Maria and Q targeted Charlie as a big threat. At Tribal Council, Q chose not to play his idol, and he became the fourth consecutive player to be voted out with an idol in his pocket.
674	13	"Friends Going to War"	0.75/8	May 22, 2024	4.51
Maria tried to convince Charlie that the others had turned her against him, though Charlie saw through the ruse.: Reward/Immunity Challenge: Castaways crawled through a muddied tunnel and removed rope from a plank full of holes before releasing a monkey's fist to lower a bridge and untie a key. Once at the finish, they used the key to unlock puzzle pieces and solve a word puzzle, which revealed directions to find a numbered code that opened a combination lock and allowed them to strike a gong. The first to finish won immunity, as well as a reward of pasta, garlic bread, dessert and wine.; Kenzie solved her puzzle first but couldn't figure out the code, so Liz raced back to retrieve Kenzie's plank so that Kenzie could beat Maria in the challenge. She decided to share her reward with Ben, and they agreed to vote out Maria. At camp, Maria tried to sway Charlie and Liz into voting out Ben, believing him to be a harder player than he was perceived as. At Tribal Council however, Maria was sent to the jury unanimously.: Immunity Challenge: Castaways threw a ball upwards into a ramp full of pegs before beginning to complete a block puzzle. When the ball ricocheted to the bottom of the table, they would have to grab the ball and throw it into the mechanism again before being able to continue. If the castaway missed grabbing the ball, they would have to wait a time penalty before collecting their ball and continuing. The first to complete their puzzle won immunity.; Ben won the challenge. He felt that Liz was the biggest threat and debated whether to pit Charlie or Kenzie against her in the fire making challenge. He decided to bring Charlie to the end, and sent Kenzie and Liz to the fire making challenge.: Fire Making Challenge: Kenzie and Liz faced off with Kenzie starting her fire first closely followed by Liz, but Liz’s fire went out almost immediately. Kenzie had a good flame going as she quickly built her fire that grew very large very fast burning through the rope before Liz had a chance to again start her fire thus sending Liz to the jury.; At the Final Tribal Council, the discussion mainly focused on Charlie's strategic game against Kenzie's social game. Charlie highlighted how he managed information, options, and threat throughout the game, while Kenzie emphasized her positive relationships with the jury and perseverance in the face of her original tribe's early struggles. The jury critiqued both on whether they could set themselves apart with a game-defining move. Ben acknowledged how the season challenged him; he was seen by the jury as a follower who got lost in the shuffle multiple times. In the end, Kenzie was named the Sole Survivor in a 5–3–0 vote over Charlie and Ben.

== Voting history ==
Survivor 46 voting history
	Original tribes						No tribes	Merged tribe									
Episode	1	2	3	4	5		6	7		8	9		10	11	12	13	
Day	3	5	7	9	11		13	14 (Note: On Day 14, a split Tribal Council was held. The castaways were divided into two groups of six; each group went to Tribal Council separately to eliminate one castaway from each.)		16	17		19	21	23	24	25
Tribe	Yanu	Yanu	Nami	Yanu	Siga		None	Nuinui	Nuinui	Nuinui	Nuinui		Nuinui	Nuinui	Nuinui	Nuinui	Nuinui
Eliminated	Jelinsky	Jess	Randen	Bhanu	Jem		Moriah	Tim	Soda	Tevin	Tie (Note: The vote resulted in a tie. Per the rules, a second vote was held where the castaways involved in the tie would not vote and the remaining castaways could only vote for those who tied.)	Hunter	Tiffany	Venus	Q	Maria	Liz
Votes	5–0	4–1	Evacuated (Note: No vote; Randen was medically evacuated from the game.)	3–0 (Note: Following an open poll of his tribemates, in which they confirmed they would all vote for him, Bhanu was eliminated without a formal vote.)	4–2		10–1	4–2	4–2	8–2	4–4–1	6–1	5–3	5–1–1	4–2	4–1	None (Note: For winning the final Immunity Challenge, Ben had to assign additional immunity to another player, with the remaining two competing in a fire-making challenge to determine the third finalist; he gave additional immunity to Charlie, and Kenzie defeated Liz in the fire-making challenge.)
Voter	Vote																Challenge
Kenzie	Jelinsky	Jess		Bhanu			Moriah	Tim		Tevin	Q	Hunter	Q	Venus	Q	Maria	Won
Charlie					Jem		Venus		Soda	Tevin	Hunter	Hunter	Tiffany	Venus	Q	Maria	Saved
Ben					None (Note: This player lost a vote attempting to gain an advantage.)		Moriah	Hunter		Tevin	Hunter	Hunter	Tiffany	Kenzie	Q	Maria	Immune
Liz							Moriah		Soda	Tevin	Q	Q	Tiffany	Venus	Q	Maria	Lost
Maria					Jem	Jem (Note: This player played an extra vote advantage, allowing them to cast two ballots during a single vote.)	Moriah		Soda	Tevin	Hunter	Hunter	Tiffany	Venus	Charlie	Ben	
Q	Jelinsky	Jess		Bhanu			Moriah	Tim		Tevin	Ben	None (Note: This player was not eligible to vote in the second round of voting.)	Tiffany	Venus	Charlie		
Venus							Moriah		Soda	Tevin	Q	Hunter	Q	Q			
Tiffany	Jelinsky	Jess		Bhanu			Moriah	Tim		Tevin	Hunter	Hunter	Q				
Hunter							None	Tim		Venus	Q	None					
Tevin							Moriah		Venus	Venus							
Soda							Moriah		Venus								
Tim					Jem		Moriah	Hunter									
Moriah					Ben		None (Note: This player played the Shot in the Dark, and as a result, had to sacrifice that night's vote.)										
Jem					Ben												
Bhanu	Jelinsky	Jess		None													
Randen			Evacuated														
Jess	Jelinsky	Bhanu															
Jelinsky	None																

Jury vote
Episode	13		
Day	26		
Finalist	Kenzie	Charlie	Ben
Votes	5–3–0		
Juror	Vote		
Liz		Yes	
Maria	Yes		
Q	Yes		
Venus	Yes		
Tiffany	Yes		
Hunter		Yes	
Tevin	Yes		
Soda		Yes	

== Production ==
On February 21, 2023, CBS renewed Survivor for the 2023–24 television season. Although the initial announcement explicitly confirmed the forty-fifth season, a forty-sixth season was expected because the program regularly filmed two seasons consecutively. CBS formally confirmed Survivor 46 when it announced the network's 2024 schedule and a February 28 premiere date.

The season was filmed from June 3 through June 28, 2023, in the Mamanuca Islands of Fiji, making it the fourteenth consecutive season filmed there. It retained the 26-day format introduced in season 41, with 18 contestants initially divided among three tribes.

CBS retained the 90-minute episode format introduced during the previous season. The premiere and second episode were each scheduled for two hours, followed by 90-minute episodes for the remainder of the season.

Unlike the preceding season, the production team filmed Survivor 46 without confirmation that its episodes would receive the extended runtime. Host and executive producer Jeff Probst said that the crew kept the possibility of 90-minute episodes in mind during filming but did not have the resources to produce the season specifically for that length. During post-production, editors used additional contestant interviews and smaller character moments to expand the episodes. Probst separately stated that producers had anticipated the possibility of retaining the longer format and considered opportunities for additional material throughout filming.

== Reception ==
Survivor 46 received mostly positive reviews. Praise was given to the cast and the abundance of stand-out moments during the season but the season was also criticised for its disproportionate editing, particularly during the pre-merge. Entertainment Weekly's Dalton Ross ranked the season 21st out of 46, praising the season's strong cast and presence of drama and rivalries that had been missing from recent seasons. Nick Caruso of TVLine ranked this season 19th out of 47.
