= Survivor 50: In the Hands of the Fans =

Season of television series

- Season 50
- Presented by: Jeff Probst
- No. of days: 26
- No. of castaways: 24
- Winner: Aubry Bracco
- Runner-up: Jonathan Young
- Location: Mamanuca Islands, Fiji
- Sia Fan Favorite Prize: Cirie Fields
- No. of episodes: 13

Release
- Original network: CBS
- Original release: February 25 – May 20, 2026

Additional information
- Filming dates: June 6 – July 1, 2025

Season chronology
- ← Previous; Survivor 49 Next → Survivor 51

Survivor 50: In the Hands of the Fans is the 50th season of the American competitive reality television series Survivor. It premiered on February 25, 2026, on CBS in the United States, and it is the eighteenth consecutive season to be filmed in the Mamanuca Islands in Fiji. Commemorating the show's twenty-fifth anniversary, this season features game mechanics and production designs chosen by an online public vote which occurred during Survivor 48.

The season ended on May 20, 2026, when Aubry Bracco was voted the Sole Survivor, defeating Jonathan Young and Joe Hunter in an 8–3–0 vote to win the largest grand prize awarded on Survivor – consisting of a $2 million cash prize and a Toyota Land Cruiser. Occurring a decade after her Final Tribal Council defeat to Michele Fitzgerald in Survivor: Kaôh Rōng, Aubry's victory made her the second Survivor player to win their first Sole Survivor title on their fourth season or later, following "Boston Rob" Mariano in Survivor: Redemption Island. Cirie Fields was awarded $100,000 as the winner of the "Sia Fan Favorite Prize."

== Format ==
Survivor is a reality television show based on the Swedish show Expedition Robinson, created by Mark Burnett and Charlie Parsons. The series follows a number of participants isolated in a remote location, where they must provide food, fire, and shelter. One by one, a participant is removed from the series by majority vote, with challenges held to give a reward (ranging from living- and food-related prizes to a car) and immunity from being voted out of the series. The last remaining player receives a prize of $1,000,000, later $2,000,000.

== Contestants ==
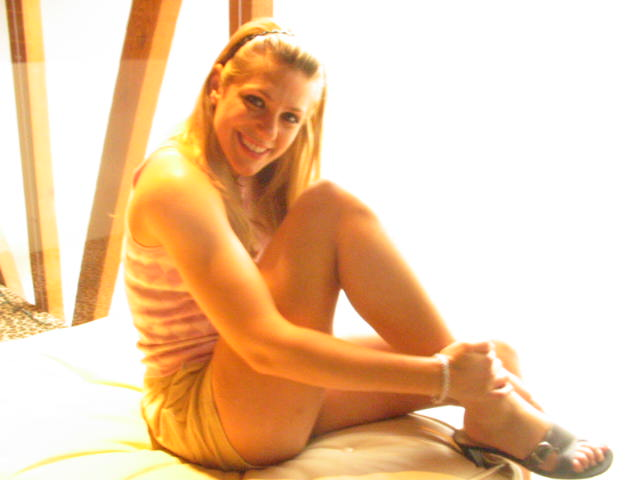
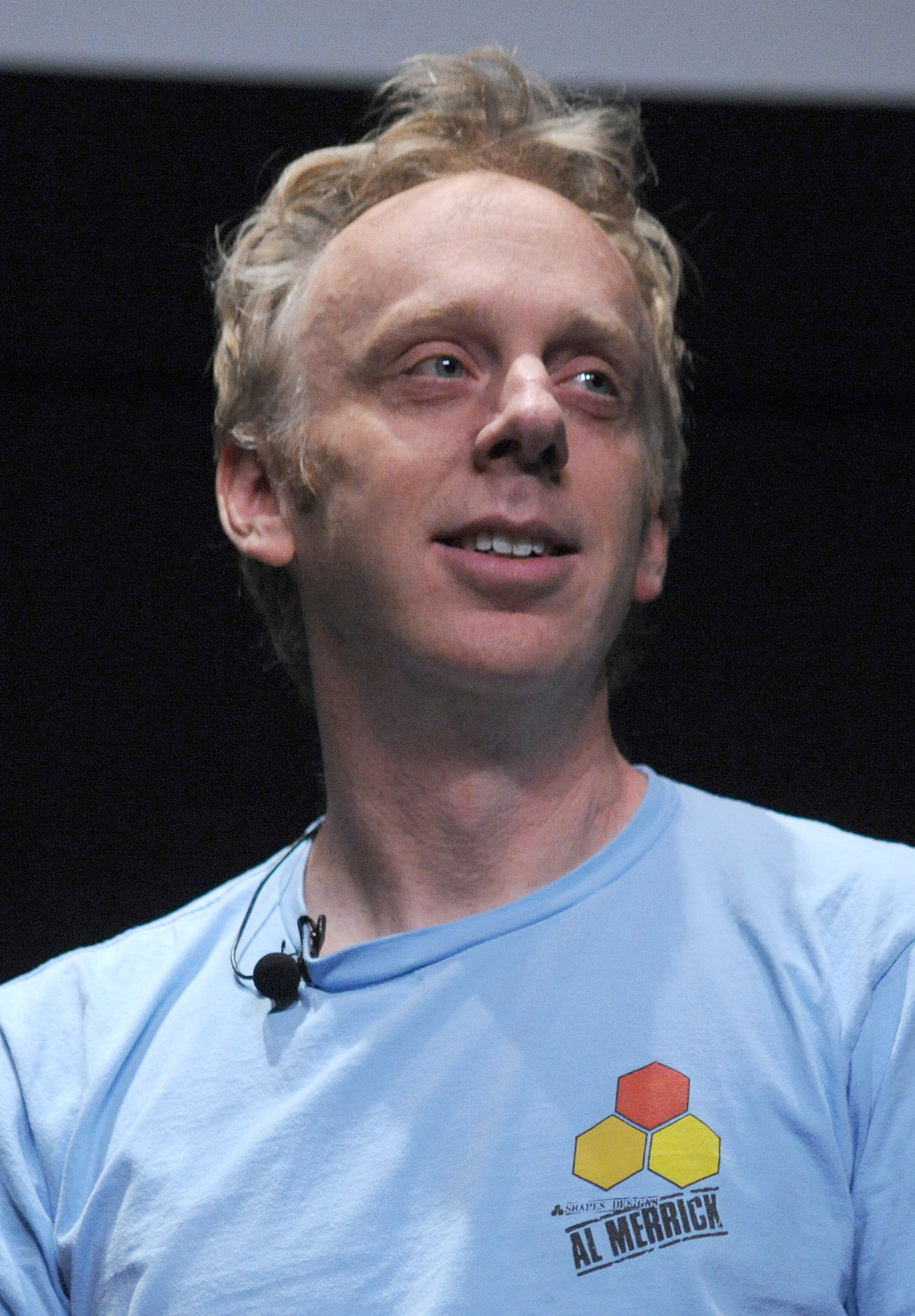
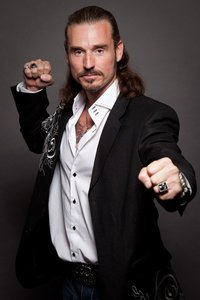
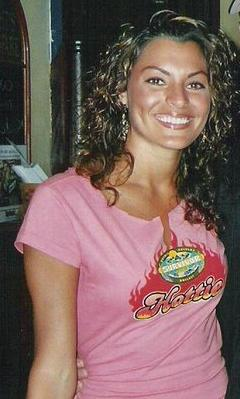
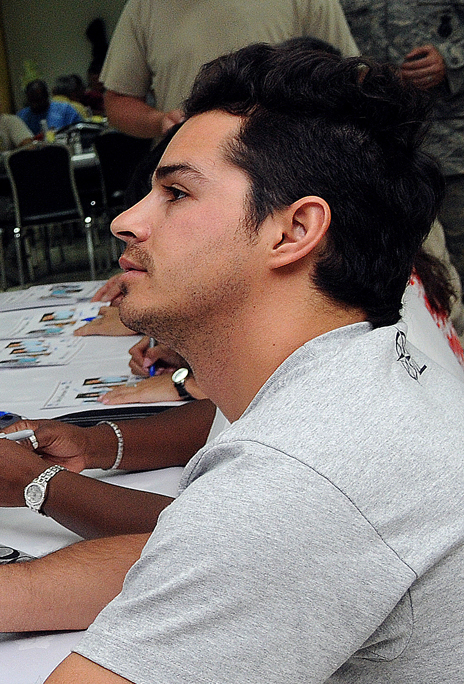
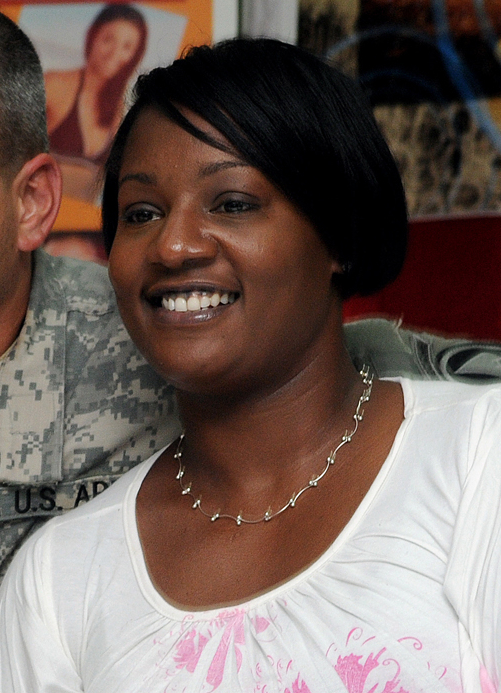
From left to right: Jenna Lewis-Dougherty, Mike White, Benjamin "Coach" Wade, Stephenie LaGrossa Kendrick, Ozzy Lusth and Cirie Fields

22 of the 24 castaways competing on Survivor 50 were officially announced on CBS Mornings on May 28, 2025. Two remaining contestants from Survivor 49 were left unannounced and were later announced on the conclusion of the latter's finale, which was on December 17, 2025. Similar to Russell Hantz during Survivor: Heroes vs. Villains, Malcolm Freberg during Survivor: Caramoan, and Zeke Smith and Michaela Bradshaw during Survivor: Game Changers, the other cast members did not have an opportunity to see Rizo and Savannah's game-play in Survivor 49, due to 49 and this season being filmed back to back.

List of Survivor 50: In the Hands of the Fans contestants
Contestant	Age	From	Tribe			Finish	
Contestant	Age	From	Original	Switched	Merged	Placement	Day
Jenna Lewis-Dougherty Borneo & All-Stars	47	Woodland, California	Cila			1st voted out	Day 3
Kyle Fraser Survivor 48	31	Brooklyn, New York	Vatu			Medically evacuated	Day 4
Savannah Louie Survivor 49	31	Atlanta, Georgia	Cila			2nd voted out	Day 6
Quintavius "Q" Burdette Survivor 46	31	Germantown, Tennessee	Vatu	Vatu		3rd voted out	Day 8
Mike White David vs. Goliath	54	Hanalei, Hawaii	Kalo	Vatu		4th voted out	Day 9
Angelina Keeley David vs. Goliath	35	San Diego, California	Vatu	Vatu		5th voted out	Day 11
Charlie Davis Survivor 46	27	Boston, Massachusetts	Kalo	Cila		6th voted out	Day 11
Kamilla Karthigesu Survivor 48	31	Foster City, California	Kalo	Cila	Manulevu	7th voted out	Day 13
Genevieve Mushaluk Survivor 47	34	Winnipeg, Manitoba	Vatu	Kalo	Manulevu	8th voted out	Day 13
Colby Donaldson The Australian Outback, All-Stars & Heroes vs. Villains	51	Austin, Texas	Vatu	Kalo	Manulevu	9th voted out	Day 13
Dee Valladares Survivor 45	28	Miami, Florida	Kalo	Cila	Manulevu	10th voted out 1st jury member	Day 15
Chrissy Hofbeck Heroes vs. Healers vs. Hustlers	54	The Villages, Florida	Kalo	Kalo	Manulevu	11th & 12th voted out 2nd & 3rd jury members	Day 16
Benjamin "Coach" Wade Tocantins, Heroes vs. Villains & South Pacific	53	Susanville, California	Kalo	Kalo	Manulevu	11th & 12th voted out 2nd & 3rd jury members	Day 16
Christian Hubicki David vs. Goliath	39	Tallahassee, Florida	Cila	Vatu	Manulevu	13th voted out 4th jury member	Day 18
Stephenie LaGrossa Kendrick Palau, Guatemala & Heroes vs. Villains	45	Dunedin, Florida	Vatu	Vatu	Manulevu	14th voted out 5th jury member	Day 19
Emily Flippen Survivor 45	30	Laurel, Maryland	Cila	Vatu	Manulevu	15th voted out 6th jury member	Day 21
Oscar "Ozzy" Lusth Cook Islands, Micronesia, South Pacific & Game Changers	43	Guanajuato, Mexico	Cila	Vatu	Manulevu	16th voted out 7th jury member	Day 21
Rick Devens Edge of Extinction	41	Macon, Georgia	Cila	Cila	Manulevu	17th voted out 8th jury member	Day 22
Cirie Fields Panama, Micronesia, Heroes vs. Villains, Game Changers & AU: Australia vs. The World	54	Jersey City, New Jersey	Cila	Cila	Manulevu	18th voted out 9th jury member	Day 23
Tiffany Ervin Survivor 46	34	Los Angeles, California	Kalo	Kalo	Manulevu	19th voted out 10th jury member	Day 24
Rizo Velovic Survivor 49	25	Yonkers, New York	Vatu	Cila	Manulevu	Eliminated; 11th jury member	Day 25
Joe Hunter Survivor 48	45	West Sacramento, California	Cila	Kalo	Manulevu	2nd runner-up	Day 26
Jonathan Young Survivor 42	32	Gulf Shores, Alabama	Kalo	Cila	Manulevu	Runner-up	Day 26
Aubry Bracco Kaôh Rōng, Game Changers & Edge of Extinction	39	Hampton Falls, New Hampshire	Vatu	Kalo	Manulevu	Sole Survivor	Day 26

=== Future appearances ===
Outside of Survivor, Rick Devens and Dee Valladares competed on season 28 of Big Brother. Q Burdette competed on the sixth season of The Traitors.

== Season summary ==
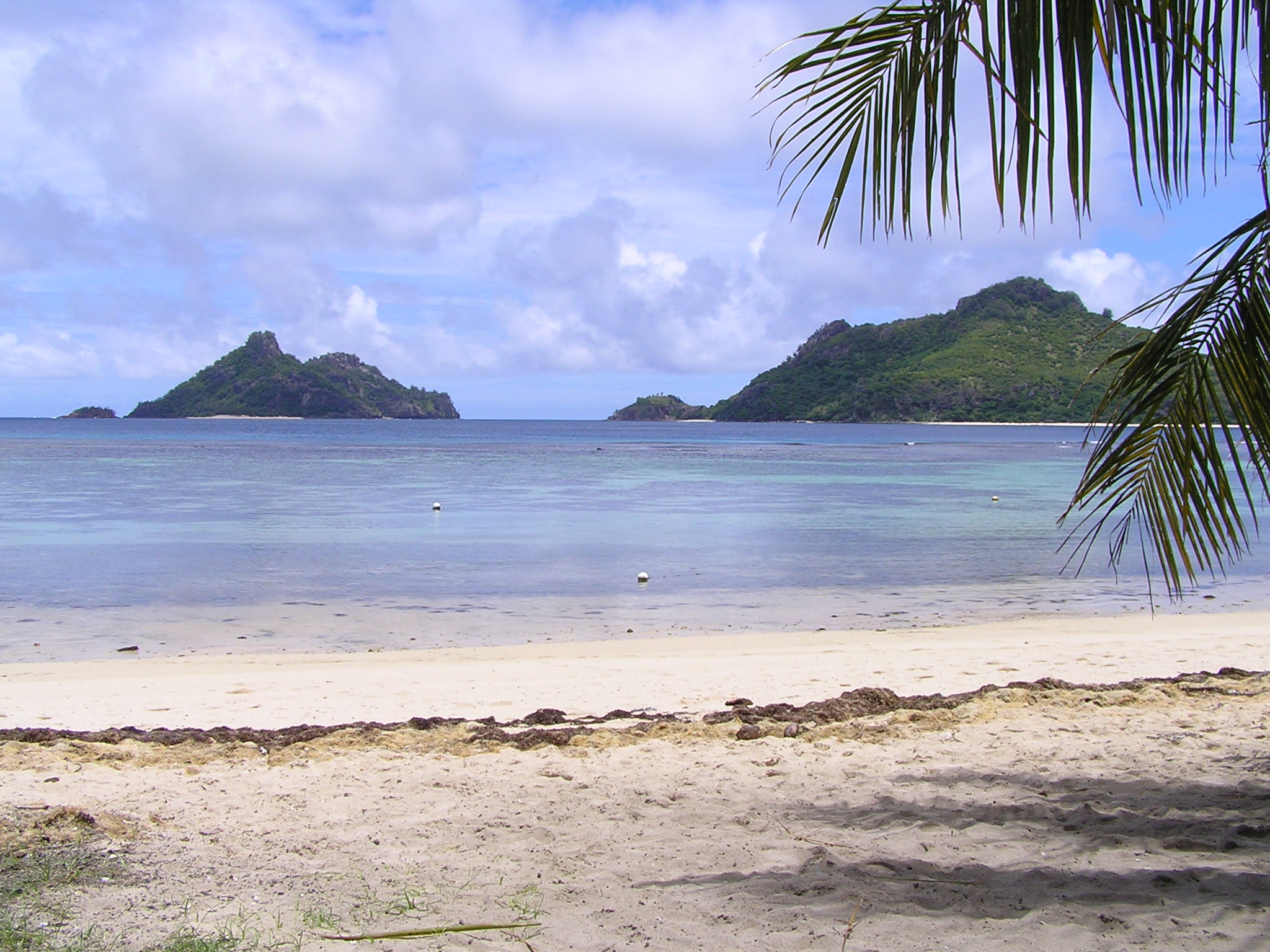
The season filmed in the Mamanuca Islands of Fiji.

The 24 returning players were initially divided into three tribes: Cila, Kalo, and Vatu. Cila struggled in the first two immunity challenges, losing Jenna and Savannah early. Vatu lost Kyle by a medical evacuation. In challenges, Kalo and Vatu remained dominant. Aubry and Genevieve immediately began an unspoken rivalry. Following a tribe swap, the new Vatu tribe lost the next three immunity challenges, with Q, Mike, and Angelina being voted out back-to-back. At Cila, Charlie and Rizo were at odds. The new Kalo tribe remained strong and did not lose a challenge throughout the swap. Throughout the pre-merge, tight bonds formed between Cirie, Ozzy, and Rizo, as well as Christian, Emily, and Rick. Another alliance formed between the honor-and-integrity players: Chrissy, Coach, Colby, Genevieve, Joe, Jonathan, and Stephenie.

At the tribes merge and the "Blood Moon," two main factions emerged: an alliance led by the honor players and several smaller alliances made up of the middle players. Dee and Kamilla were immediate targets from the honor players. Aubry became a major target due to both her immunity idol and reputation as a smart player, while Christian, Emily, and Rick continued to play flashy and bold games. Cirie and her alliance with Ozzy and Rizo continued to work together until Rizo ultimately turned against them, knowing he had little chance of winning otherwise. Tiffany gained momentum towards the end of the game winning multiple immunity necklaces but was taken out at the final vote.

At the Final Tribal Council, Joe was criticized by the jury, with some players feeling they had to babysit him throughout the game. Aubry was praised for playing a perfect middle game and reaching the Final Three despite becoming a major target at the merge. Jonathan was commended for his challenge dominance and "old school" style of gameplay. Ultimately, the jury awarded Aubry the title of Sole Survivor in an 8–3–0 vote over Jonathan and Joe.

Survivor 50 season summary
Episode			Challenge winner(s)		Exile Island / Journey	Eliminated	
No.	Title	Air date	Reward	Immunity	Exile Island / Journey	Tribe	Player(s)
1	"Epic Party"	February 25, 2026	Vatu	Kalo	Ozzy (Cila)	Cila	Jenna
1	"Epic Party"	February 25, 2026	Vatu	Vatu	Q (Vatu)	Cila	Jenna
1	"Epic Party"	February 25, 2026	None		Colby (Vatu)	Vatu	Kyle
1	"Epic Party"	February 25, 2026	None		Mike (Kalo)	Vatu	Kyle
1	"Epic Party"	February 25, 2026	None		Savannah (Cila)	Vatu	Kyle
2	"Therapy Carousel"	March 4, 2026	Cila	Vatu	None	Cila	Savannah
2	"Therapy Carousel"	March 4, 2026	Kalo	Kalo	None	Cila	Savannah
3	"Did You Vote For a Swap?"	March 11, 2026	Cila		None	Vatu	Q
3	"Did You Vote For a Swap?"	March 11, 2026	Kalo		None	Vatu	Q
4	"Knife to the Heart"	March 18, 2026	Kalo		None	Vatu	Mike
4	"Knife to the Heart"	March 18, 2026		Cila	None	Vatu	Mike
5	"Open Wounds"	March 25, 2026	None	Kalo	None	Vatu	Angelina
5	"Open Wounds"	March 25, 2026	None	Kalo	None	Cila	Charlie
6	"The Blood Moon"	April 1, 2026	Stephenie [Chrissy, Jonathan, Kamilla, Tiffany] (Note: In addition to immunity, Stephenie won reward for her entire team for lasting the longest in the challenge.)	Stephenie	Ozzy [Rizo] (Note: Ozzy found an advantage which sent him and another (non-negotiable) player of his choice to Exile Island, thereby unknowingly exempting them from the triple tribal councils. He selected Rizo to join him.)	Manulevu	Kamilla
6	"The Blood Moon"	April 1, 2026	Stephenie [Chrissy, Jonathan, Kamilla, Tiffany]	Christian	Ozzy [Rizo]	Manulevu	Genevieve
6	"The Blood Moon"	April 1, 2026	Stephenie [Chrissy, Jonathan, Kamilla, Tiffany]	Dee	Ozzy [Rizo]	Manulevu	Colby
7	"That's Not How I Play Survivor"	April 8, 2026	Christian, Dee, Emily, Joe, Ozzy, Rick, Stephenie	Ozzy	Stephenie	Manulevu	Dee
8	"Double The Fun, Double The Demise"	April 15, 2026	Joe & Tiffany (Note: On Day 16, castaways were paired up and would win the challenge as a pair. In addition, one of those same pairings would be voted out together, although votes would be cast on an individual basis.) (Note: In addition to immunity, Joe and Tiffany won reward.)	Joe & Tiffany [Cirie] (Note: Cirie was immune due to not having been chosen for a pair and being sent to Exile Island. She later earned the right to participate in Tribal Council at Exile Island, but still remained immune.)	Cirie	Manulevu	Chrissy & Coach
9	"I Deserve All of This"	April 22, 2026	Joe, Jonathan, Ozzy, Tiffany (Note: During the immunity challenge, this group won rice for the entire tribe by outlasting Jeff in the challenge.)	Joe	Christian	Manulevu	Christian
10	"A Side Dish of Chaos"	April 29, 2026	Survivor Auction	Tiffany [Rick] (Note: Rick volunteered to participate in the "MrBeast Super Beware Advantage" and therefore had to flip a coin at Tribal Council; he won, and was granted immunity.)	None	Manulevu	Stephenie
11	"Everyone Will Be Shooketh!"	May 6, 2026	Jonathan (Note: Jonathan received an additional individual reward for finishing first place overall in the challenge.)		None	Manulevu	Emily
11	"Everyone Will Be Shooketh!"	May 6, 2026	Jonathan		None	Manulevu	Ozzy
12	"Inconceivable"	May 13, 2026	Joe [Cirie, Rizo] (Note: In addition to immunity, Joe won reward for himself and two other castaways of his choice; he chose Cirie and Rizo.)	Joe	None	Manulevu	Rick
12	"Inconceivable"	May 13, 2026	None	Tiffany	None	Manulevu	Cirie
13	"Reverse the Curse"	May 20, 2026	None	Jonathan	None	Manulevu	Tiffany
13	"Reverse the Curse"	May 20, 2026	None	Aubry [Joe] (Note: For winning the final Immunity Challenge, Aubry had to assign additional immunity to another player, with the remaining two competing in a fire-making challenge to determine the third finalist; she gave additional immunity to Joe.)	None	Manulevu	Rizo

== Episodes ==
No. overall	No. in season	Title	Day(s)	Rating/share (18–49)	Original release date	U.S. viewers (millions)
715	1	"Epic Party"	Days 1–4	0.95/13	February 25, 2026	5.06
The 24 returning castaways began their adventure. After Jeff welcomed the returning Survivors and discussed what it meant to return, the players selected small packages with their names on them, each containing a tribe buff, and the three tribes were revealed.: Marooning Challenge: One person must dig and crawl under a beam to retrieve a key. The next person will use the key to unlock paddles. Two players then unload rope from a boat, while two others paddle the boat to a platform and retrieve a locked torch before paddling back to shore. Two more players must retrieve another key from atop a tall pole and use it to unlock the torch. The first team to light their torch will win flint.; Vatu won the challenge. Each tribe had to choose a member of their tribe to go on a journey to get their tribe supply. Ozzy, Coach, and Q were selected to go.: Supply Challenge: Players must retrieve three bags of sticks and twine by climbing a pole, digging in the sand, and swimming out to a buoy. Once all three bags are collected, they must tie the sticks together to create a long pole and use it to retrieve a key. The player who successfully retrieves the key will win supplies for their tribe.; Ozzy knocked the key off the post first, but Coach grabbed it and won the challenge. Following the challenge, Ozzy and Q read what they believed was a reward clue, only to discover they were being sent to Exile Island for losing. The next morning, they were told they had to agree that one of them would give up their vote to receive supplies, while the other would gain an extra vote. Ozzy convinced Q to give up his vote, allowing Q to receive his tribes supplies while Ozzy gained an extra vote.: Immunity Challenge: Tribes must climb up and down cargo nets, then crawl in pairs through a mud tunnel. Two players must push a cage filled with coconuts onto a platform, and two more unload them. A fifth player must toss the coconuts into a net to release a crate containing a weighted rope and ball. A sixth player must use the rope ball to activate a lever, releasing a ramp. After all tribe members climb the ramp, the final two players assemble a logo puzzle to win immunity. The first two tribes to finish win immunity, while the losing tribe must forfeit their flint.; The challenge was paused when Kyle injured himself and was unable to put weight on his foot, but he continued in the challenge. Kalo and Vatu won the challenge. At Cila, Jenna threw out Cirie's name out for the first vote. Ozzy alerted Cirie, and at Tribal Council the tribe unanimously voted out Jenna for playing too aggressively early in the game. On Day 4, Genevieve and Stephenie found the Billie Eilish Boomerang Idol, a special immunity idol that had to be given to someone on another tribe. The recipient could not use the idol on anyone else, and if voted out while in possession of it, the idol would "boomerang" back to its finder (in this case, Genevieve, who decided to gift the idol to Ozzy).: Journey Challenge: Colby, Mike, and Savannah were selected for a Journey, but only two could compete. They drew rocks, and Mike lost the draw. Colby and Savannah had to build a tower one piece at a time, alternating turns until it fell. The winner would not lose a vote at Tribal Council. Colby lost his vote. After he departed, Savannah was informed that she had also won a Block-a-Vote advantage.; Although Kyle was feeling better on Day 4, Jeff and the medical team evaluated him at camp and diagnosed a likely ruptured Achilles tendon. He was medically evacuated from the game.
716	2	"Therapy Carousel"	Days 4–6	0.94/12	March 4, 2026	4.95
Joe continues to struggle working alongside supposed schemer Rick, much to the annoyance of fellow Cila members Emily and Christian. Coach and Jonathan go fishing, where a rescue boat has to save a stranded Coach. At the reward challenge, Coach and Ozzy continue to bicker over Coach taking the key in the first reward challenge.: Reward Challenge: Survivors one at a time leap off a platform to smash a tile suspended above the water releasing a key. They then cross a series of balance beams and swim to the finish. After three keys are retrieved, another player dives down to retrieve two rings. The remaining players use the keys to unlock a final ring and then must toss them onto three floating targets. The first two tribes to finish win reward.; Kalo and Cila won reward. Genevieve becomes convinced her rival, Aubry, has an idol and searches through her belongings. Christian found a second Billie Eilish Boomerang Idol and gifted it to Aubry shortly afterwards.: Immunity Challenge: Each tribe had three teams of two who sprinted into the jungle, one pair at a time, to retrieve three heavy snakes. Each team had to drag their snake back through an obstacle course. After all three snakes had been retrieved, three contestants used three ropes tied to a ring to maneuver a ball along a windy snake table. The first two teams to finish won immunity, while the losing tribe had to forfeit their flint.; Vatu and Kalo won Immunity. Before Tribal Council Ozzy gave his extra vote to Cirie. Christian wants Savannah out, as the only winner, whilst Ricks wants Joe out and Emily wants Ozzy out. Cirie works to protect Ozzy by suggesting that Savannah has an advantage from her prior journey. Savannah attempts to convince everyone that Cirie and Ozzy are working together and to target Ozzy instead. At Tribal Council, Savannah was unanimously voted out with a Block-a-Vote in her pocket. As the Survivors were leaving, Christian distracted the tribe by falling to the ground, allowing Rick to plant a fake immunity idol in the seating area.
717	3	"Did You Vote For a Swap?"	Days 6–8	0.87/11	March 11, 2026	4.88
On Day 7, the tribes were reshuffled. Charlie, Kamilla, Dee, Rizo and Jonathan went to Cila with Rick and Cirie. Aubry, Colby, Joe and Genevieve went to Kalo with Tiffany, Chrissy and Coach. Emily, Christian, Ozzy and Mike went to Vatu with Q, Angelina and Stephenie. On Vatu, Christian, Mike, and Angelina reform their alliance from David vs Goliath. Emily attempts to bring Ozzy and Christian together for an alliance. On Kalo, Coach aligns with Colby and Joe, viewing them as honorable warriors, whilst Genevieve works on her relationships with Chrissy. Genevieve attempts to gather votes against Aubry if they lose immunity, but Tiffany informs Aubry. On Vatu, Cirie becomes worried about her position due to fears of her reputation, as Devens is her only ally alongside her. Charlie, Dee, Kamilla, and Jonathan all agree to remain allied from their prior tribe. Rizo attempts to align with Charlie, but Charlie takes an instant disliking to him due to Rizo claiming he did not vote for his number one ally to win Survivor 49.: Reward/Immunity Challenge: A caller for each tribe directed their blindfolded tribemates around and through obstacles, searching for three rings that were used to unlock a puzzle. The caller then led the blindfolded members to the puzzle table and directed two still-blindfolded tribemate in solving the puzzle. The first two tribes to finish win immunity and a reward, four chickens for first place and one chicken for second place, while the losing tribe had to forfeit their flint.; Cila and Kalo won. Mike, Angelina, and Christian plan to claim the target is Stephenie, but to vote out Q instead. However, Q tells Mike to vote for him to protect Stephenie, before claiming he has an extra vote. Ozzy and Stephenie plan to instead vote out Angelina, leaving Emily conflicted. At Tribal Council, Q did not have a vote, Stephenie voted for Angelina, the remaining members voted out Q.
718	4	"Knife to the Heart"	Days 8–9	0.96/12	March 18, 2026	5.22
On Kalo, Aubry and Genevieve search for an idol to target the other. Genevieve finds the third Billie Eilish Boomerang Idol, her second overall, and gifts it to Rizo. On Vatu, Ozzy continues to work with Emily, and they agree to target Angelina to try and bring Mike closer. Angelina, meanwhile, wants to target Stephenie. On Cila, the tribe host a talent show, which Rizo wins with his Mickey Mouse impression, annoying Charlie.: Reward/Immunity Challenge: Survivors leap into the water and swim to a narrow platform to retrieve two suspended buckets. Sandbags are then removed from their submerged boats and the buckets used to bail the water. Letter cubes are then loaded into the boat and the boat dragged to the finish on shore where the letters are used to build a large arch puzzle. The first to correctly spell the word "Celebration" on both sides of the arch wins reward and immunity. The second tribe to finish wins only immunity, while the losing tribe had to forfeit their flint.; Kalo and Cila won Immunity. Kalo won the reward, a trip to the Survivor Sanctuary with a feast and music by Zac Brown. On Vatu, Ozzy continues to try to gather the votes against Angelina. He informs Mike, who decides to target Emily to protect Angelina, believing that he has the numbers due to their alliance with Christian. Christian instead decides to target Mike due to his scheming, convincing Stephenie to join him, but Emily is reluctant to betray Ozzy. Much to Christian's exasperation, she openly tells Ozzy of Mike's plan. Christian worries Emily may betray him further down the line, whilst Emily becomes worried about Ozzy's dismissal of Mike's threats. At Tribal Council, Ozzy voted for Angelina, Mike and Angelina voted for Emily, and the remaining three members voted out Mike.
719	5	"Open Wounds"	Days 9–11	0.93/12	March 25, 2026	5.10
Ozzy is infuriated about being blindsided with Mike's vote out, frustrating Christian in particular. However, the next morning Ozzy attempts to make amends with Christian, vowing to play a better game then his prior seasons. Ozzy aligns with Stephenie, and considers turning against Christian soon anyway. In Kalo, Aubry and Genevieve continue to target one another. Aubry bonds with Coach and is informally brought into his alliance with Colby and Joe. In Cila, Jonathan bonds with Devens and plans to bring him into his alliance with Kamilla, Dee, and Charlie. Whilst most of them agree to eliminate Rizo, Dee is reluctant as she worries without Rizo she would become the main target due to her reputation as a former winner. Rizo shares his idol with Dee, winning her trust. At night, Charlie wakes Rizo up and questions Rizo about his idol, before revealing he told Jonathan about its existence. This causes Rizo to become suspicious of Charlie, and he begins enacting a plan against him. Rizo tells Cirie about his idol, solidifying an alliance with her as she informs him of her extra vote. Before the Immunity Challenge, Jeff revealed that only one tribe would win immunity and two tribes would go to tribal.: Immunity Challenge: Two tribe members must swim and retrieve four bags of coconut each with a key, then dig under a beam. Once back, another member must empty the bags and find the keys. Once they are found, a new member will try to unlock a grappling hook. The tribe must then retrieve sandbags. Then they had to toss the sandbags onto overhead platforms. The first tribe to successfully land all five sandbags won immunity. The losing two tribes had to forfeit their flint until the next immunity challenge.; Kalo won Immunity sending both Vatu and Cila to Tribal Council. In Vatu, Christian and Ozzy continue to butt heads. Ozzy asks Christian to give him his shot in the dark to prove he will not be blindsided, and, despite initially refusing, Christian obliges. Ozzy begins to consider voting out Christian now he is vulnerable. Meanwhile, Stephenie and Angelina are also floated as potential targets. In Cila, Charlie continues to target Rizo. Rizo tells Kamilla of his idol, but she is more reluctant to flip on her alliance then Dee. Charlie tells Kamilla about Rizo's idol, unaware Rizo had already told her. Jonathan attempts to cement Kamilla's decision by emphasizing the danger of an unknown player like Rizo. However, she remains conflicted about who to eliminate. At the Tribal Councils, Vatu attended first with Angelina being unanimously voted out. At Cila's Tribal Council, the vote was split 4–3: Charlie, Jonathan and Rick voted for Rizo while the majority of Cirie, Dee, Kamila and Rizo voted to eliminate Charlie.
720	6	"The Blood Moon"	Days 11–13	0.91/12	April 1, 2026	5.00
On Day 12, the three tribes convened at Vatu's beach to begin the individual stage of the game. A mad dash ensues when castaways discover that an advantage was hidden deep in the jungle. Ozzy found the advantage and was sent to exile island. He had to choose another castaway to join him. He chose Rizo to come to exile with him, cementing the alliance between them and Cirie. Before the challenge the players were split into three groups. The teal group consisted of Coach, Colby, Cirie, Emily and Dee. The purple group consisted of Aubry, Christian, Genevieve, Joe and Rick. The orange group consisted of Chrissy, Jonathan, Kamilla, Stephenie and Tiffany.: Reward/Immunity Challenge: Players used their hands and arms to brace against two walls with their feet on narrow footholds. At intervals, they moved down to smaller footholds. If they drop, they are out. The twist: Players were split into three groups of five. One player from each group would win immunity. The group that lasts the longest gets reward. All three groups will then go to Tribal.; Stephenie lasted the longest and won immunity for herself, and reward for her group. Christian and Dee lasted the longest for their respective groups, earning them each individual immunity. At the Triple Tribal Council, the orange group attended first with Kamilla being voted out in a 3–2 vote. At the purple group's Tribal, Genevieve was unanimously voted out after her Shot in the Dark was revealed "Not Safe". Lastly, at the teal group's Tribal, Colby was unanimously voted out.
721	7	"That's Not How I Play Survivor"	Days 13–15	0.92/12	April 8, 2026	4.91
Tiffany was livid at Kamilla's elimination. Dee and Jonathan publicly accused each other of lying, while Coach threatened to turn the jury against anyone who voted him out. Stephenie was sent on a journey, where she was forced to complete an endurance challenge, holding her hand above her head for an hour under a water tower. She won the challenge, keeping her vote and earning a steal-a-vote advantage, which she shared with Cirie back at camp.: Reward Challenge: Two teams of seven must navigate a large boulder through an obstacle course, then complete a block puzzle. First team to finish won a reward of Chinese takeout, and the opportunity to compete in a subsequent individual immunity challenge.; The team of Christian, Dee, Emily, Joe, Ozzy, Rick, and Stephenie won reward, and were immediately transported to the next challenge for immunity.: Immunity Challenge: At timed intevals players must move along a narrow beam while balancing an extended pole over their heads. At the end of the pole a small circular disc held a rolling ball. The last person standing at the end of the beam with their ball on the disc won individual immunity.; Ozzy won immunity. Rizo learned that Dee told Emily about his idol and considered voting her out. Wanting to split the vote between Dee and Tiffany, Coach angered several players by dictating their votes for them. At Tribal Council, Aubry played her idol to take the target off her back, and Dee played her Shot in the Dark, which was "Not Safe". Dee was voted out in an 8–4–1 vote over Tiffany and Coach.
722	8	"Double the Fun, Double the Demise"	Days 15–16	1.04/15	April 15, 2026	5.06
Jonathan, Chrissy and Stephenie advised Coach to lay low after domineering the previous vote. Coach lied to Tiffany that he did not push her name, but she did not believe him. The tribe members were told to divide themselves into pairs ahead of the next challenge. The chosen pairs were: Aubry & Rick, Chrissy & Coach, Christian & Jonathan, Emily & Rizo, Joe & Tiffany, and Ozzy & Stephenie, leaving Cirie alone. The tribe was then informed that one pair would be voted out together at Tribal Council, with each individual voting for a pair. Cirie, who was now immune from the vote as the only castaway not paired up, was sent to Exile Island.: Immunity Challenge: Each pair navigated an obstacle course and completed a table maze. The winning pair won immunity, in addition to a reward of spaghetti and wine.; Joe & Tiffany won immunity. At Exile Island, Cirie competed in a challenge to find a marked coconut before the timer ran out; she won the challenge and earned the right to return to camp and vote in that night’s Tribal Council. Emily pushed to vote out Chrissy & Coach due to their alliance, but Rizo preferred Aubry & Rick to prevent them from playing the middle. Chrissy wanted to blindside Emily & Rizo to flush the latter’s idol. Cirie returned from Exile and rallied votes against Chrissy & Coach to protect Rizo. At Tribal Council, Rick publicly grabbed his fake idol, causing a scramble amongst the rest of the tribe. Coach used his Shot in the Dark, which was "Not Safe". Chrissy & Coach were voted out 10–1–1 over Aubry & Rick and Emily & Rizo.
723	9	"I Deserve All of This"	Days 16–18	0.81/10	April 22, 2026	5.09
Rick was criticized around camp for his antics with the fake idol at Tribal Council. Christian attempted to make amends with Jonathan, Joe and Stephenie, but they no longer trusted him. Christian suggested to Cirie that they should target Ozzy next, causing her to begin rallying votes against Christian.: Immunity Challenge: Players must hold onto a handle bar, attached to a heavy bucket filled with 25 percent of their pre-game body weight. The last player with their bucket upright won immunity. In addition, if five volunteers managed to outlast Jeff in the challenge, the entire tribe won a large bag of rice.; The players negotiated to just four players for the rice; Jonathan, Joe, Ozzy, and Tiffany outlasted Jeff, while Joe won immunity. Joe elected to have the others play rock paper scissors to decide who would go on a journey, which Christian won. Christian was forced to compete in a timed puzzle challenge. If he succeeded, he would get to cast a vote immediately for tonight's Tribal Council; if he lost, he must read a sealed envelope in front of the entire tribe. Christian lost the challenge, and informed the camp that he would be forced to cast a vote for himself at Tribal Council. Christian offered his Shot in the Dark to Jonathan as a token of trust, but Jonathan still planned to vote him out. Cirie and Tiffany schemed to vote out Emily after she targeted Ozzy, but Rizo wanted to keep the vote on Christian. At Tribal Council, Christian was voted out 6–3–2 over Rick and Ozzy.
724	10	"A Side Dish of Chaos"	Days 18–19	0.89/11	April 29, 2026	4.91
Emily and Rick bonded over their shared position at the bottom following Christian's departure. In a bold move, Rick came clean to the tribe about his fake idol, but Joe and Ozzy remained determined to target him next.: Survivor Auction: Each player received $500 to bid on items categorized as "Comfort," "Chaos," or a mix of both. Rick was first to purchase onion rings and fries, while Emily bought a milkshake. Jonathan picked up a snack tray with vegetables and dip, and later purchased a covered item. The covered item came with a choice: give another player a comfort or chaos item. He chose Ozzy, who received fried chicken and mashed potatoes, while Jonathan was forced to eat a sea slug within two minutes. Jonathan also bought a PB&J sandwich. Aubry purchased a covered item to share with another castaway. She chose Rizo, but the pair had to eat two grubs within two minutes to earn the reward: chocolate chip cookies with milk. Aubry also bought a platter of mac and cheese. Cirie purchased a blanket. She later bought toothpaste and mouthwash and also a charcuterie board. Stephenie bought a grilled cheese sandwich. Rizo picked up two chicken breasts and a protein shake, while Ozzy bought a cake. To close the auction, everyone contributed $20 toward a shared mystery item, which turned out to be letters from home. The moment took an unexpected turn when YouTuber MrBeast arrived with a briefcase containing the MrBeast Super Beware Advantage, the details of which would be revealed later at Tribal Council.; The players were then sent to compete in an individual immunity challenge.: Immunity Challenge: Castaways stood on a narrow beam while balancing a ball on a wooden bow. At regular intervals they would move down to a narrower section of the perch, making it harder to balance. If a castaway dropped their ball or stepped down from the platform they would be eliminated. The last standing castaway won immunity.; Tiffany outlasted the competition to claim the necklace. Back at camp, players read their letters and speculated about the potential impact of the Super Beware Advantage. As paranoia spread, the target shifted repeatedly, and Rick prepared to use the chaos to his advantage. At Tribal Council, MrBeast returned with his briefcase and introduced a high-stakes twist: one player would flip a coin and risk everything for a chance at a massive reward. The tribe must vote on who should take this risk and Rick volunteered. If he won the coin flip, he would gain safety, receive an immunity idol, and double the prize pool to $2,000,000. If he lost, he would be eliminated on the spot. Rick called "heads" and succeeded. Despite the dramatic twist, the vote ultimately turned against Stephenie. She attempted to use her Steal-a-Vote advantage to take Rick's vote, but it wasn't enough and she was unanimously voted out.
725	11	"Everyone Will Be Shooketh!"	Days 19–21	0.91/11	May 6, 2026	5.16
Rick celebrated his survival and newfound advantages, much to Joe's frustration in particular. Cirie and Tiffany discussed flushing Ozzy and Rizo’s idols. Meanwhile, Ozzy was troubled by a dream in which he was voted out after failing to play his idol.: Immunity Challenge: Castaways had to balance on floating A-frames, moving up onto narrower footholds after regular intervals. If a castaway fell off the platform or touched the structure they would be eliminated from the challenge. The longest lasting castaway won immunity.; Following the challenge, Jeff informed the castaways that they would be split into two groups of four and each vote out a player from their groups. For winning immunity, Jonathan won a reward to attend and vote at each of the Tribal Councils. The first group consisted of Cirie, Emily, Rick and Tiffany while the second group consisted of Aubry, Joe, Ozzy and Rizo. Back at the first group's camp, Cirie, Tiffany, and Jonathan planned to vote for Rick to flush his idol. Emily and Rick instead attempted to convince the group that Rick would play his idol on Emily so they could flip the vote onto Cirie. At Tribal Council, Cirie realized something was wrong and used her extra vote to guarantee a tie regardless of where Rick played his idol. Rick ultimately played his idol on himself, negating two votes against him. This resulted in a 2–2 tie between Cirie and Emily. During the revote, which included the tied players and Cirie's extra vote, Emily was voted out 4–2. At the second group’s camp, Joe, Jonathan, Rizo, and Ozzy initially planned to vote out Aubry. However, Ozzy informed Aubry about his alliance with Cirie and the extra vote he gifted her, prompting Aubry to convince Joe and Jonathan to instead target Ozzy. While traveling between camps, Jonathan was told by Tiffany and a bluffing Cirie that Ozzy should be the target. Cirie asked Jonathan to bring Rizo into the plan, hoping he would tip Ozzy off and encourage him to play his idol. After Joe informed Rizo that Ozzy exposed their alliance, Rizo went back and forth on whether he should flip on Ozzy or remain loyal to Cirie. At Tribal Council, Rizo decided to blindside Ozzy who chose not to play his idol and was unanimously voted out.
726	12	"Inconceivable"	Days 21–23	1.00/13	May 13, 2026	5.34
Rick scoured the island looking for an idol, but was unable to find one. The tribe continued to distrust him and planned to vote him next.: Reward/Immunity Challenge: Castaways had to balance a wobbly table and place blocks spelling the word "immunity." If their stack dropped, they had to restart. The first person to finish their stack and stand on the starting platform for three seconds won immunity.; Joe won immunity. Tiffany wanted to target Rizo to flush his idol, but Cirie convinced her that Rick was a bigger threat. At Tribal Council, Rick played his Shot in the Dark, but it was unsuccessful, and he was unanimously voted out.: Immunity Challenge: Players raced into a Survivor teeter tunnel, then maneuvered disks around an obstacle to release a handle. The handle was then used to transport letter pieces over a teeter totter balance beam. Once all the pieces were collected, they had to build an arch spelling "Inconceivable". The first to complete it won immunity.; Despite multiple players conspiring against her, Tiffany won immunity. The tribe decided to target Cirie next as a backup plan. Cirie used information Rizo gave her earlier to paint Aubry as sneaky and convince the tribe to vote her out. However, at Tribal Council, Cirie was voted out 4–2.
727	13	"Reverse the Curse"	Days 23–26	1.10/13	May 20, 2026	5.68
Tiffany was very upset at everyone especially Aubry, so she decided to target her.: Immunity Challenge: Castaways raced across several obstacles collecting keys. Once completed, they then crawled under a net, and scaled up cargo meshing to the finish, where they used the key to unlock puzzle pieces and solve a circular phoenix puzzle. The first castaway to finish won immunity.; Jonathan narrowly won immunity over Tiffany. Tiffany made her case to Joe and Jonathan about Aubry being a massive threat. Despite her efforts, at Tribal Council Tiffany was voted out 4–1.: Final Immunity Challenge: With one hand tied to their side, survivors dropped a ball into a spiral rack. They had to catch the ball at the bottom and drop it in again. At intervals, they added another ball, and then another so multiple balls were going at all times. If a ball dropped, they were eliminated.; Aubry managed to defeat Joe and win her her first individual immunity challenge of the season. Jeff revealed that the fans chose the Firemaking Challenge to decide the final three. Aubry ultimately decided to take Joe to the end, forcing Rizo and Jonathan to battle it out in fire, both of whom lost on their respective seasons.: Firemaking Challenge: Jonathan easily defeated Rizo, making him the final jury member.; On the final day, the finalist were surprised by their loved ones. Several months later, Aubry was named the Sole Survivor in an 8–3–0 vote over Jonathan and Joe, respectively, and won the US$2 million prize along with a Toyota Land Cruiser. Probst later announced that the fans voted for Cirie Fields to be awarded with the "Sia Fan Favorite" prize of $100,000.

== Voting history ==
Survivor 50 voting history
	Original tribes			Switched tribes				Merged tribe																
Episode	1		2	3	4	5		6			7	8	9	10		11					12		13	
Day	3	4	6	8	9	11		13 (Note: On Day 13, a split Tribal Council was held. The castaways were divided into three groups of five; each group went to Tribal Council separately to eliminate one castaway from each.)			15	16 (Note: On Day 16, castaways were paired up and would win the challenge as a pair. In addition, one of those same pairings would be voted out together, although votes would be cast on an individual basis.)	18	19		21 (Note: On Day 21, a split Tribal Council was held. The castaways were divided into two groups of four; each group went to Tribal Council separately to eliminate one castaway from each. For winning immunity, Jonathan attended both Tribal Councils.)					22	23	24	25
Tribe	Cila	Vatu	Cila	Vatu	Vatu	Vatu	Cila	Manulevu	Manulevu	Manulevu	Manulevu	Manulevu	Manulevu	Manulevu		Manulevu				Manulevu	Manulevu	Manulevu	Manulevu	Manulevu
Eliminated	Jenna	Kyle	Savannah	Q	Mike	Angelina	Charlie	Kamilla	Genevieve	Colby	Dee	Chrissy & Coach	Christian	Stephenie		Tie (Note: The vote resulted in a tie. Per the rules, a second vote was held. As one of the castaways involved in the tie had used an advantage, all castaways were eligible to vote for those players who tied.)		Emily		Ozzy	Rick	Cirie	Tiffany	Rizo
Votes	7–1	Evacuated (Note: No vote; Kyle was medically evacuated from the game.)	6–1	5–1	3–2–1	4–1	4–3	3–2	4–0	4–0	8–4–1	10–1–1	6–3–2	8–2		2–2–0 (Note: Rick played a hidden immunity idol on himself; therefore, two votes against him were not counted.)		4–2		4–1	6–0	4–2	4–1	None (Note: For winning the final Immunity Challenge, Aubry had to assign additional immunity to another player, with the remaining two competing in a fire-making challenge to determine the third finalist; she gave additional immunity to Joe, and Jonathan defeated Rizo in the fire-making challenge.)
Voter	Vote																							Challenge
Aubry									Genevieve		Dee	Chrissy & Coach	Christian	Stephenie						Ozzy	Rick	Cirie	Tiffany	Immune
Jonathan							Rizo	Kamilla			Dee	Aubry & Rick	Rick	Stephenie		~~Rick~~		Emily		Ozzy	Rick	Cirie	Tiffany	Won
Joe	Jenna		Savannah						Genevieve		Tiffany	Chrissy & Coach	Christian	Stephenie						Ozzy	Rick	Cirie	Tiffany	Saved
Rizo							Charlie	Exiled (Note: After finding an advantage on Day 13, Ozzy was sent to Exile Island and had to choose another castaway to join him. He chose Rizo.)			Dee	Chrissy & Coach	Christian	Stephenie						Ozzy	Rick	Cirie	Tiffany	Lost
Tiffany								Chrissy			Coach	Chrissy & Coach	Christian	Stephenie		~~Rick~~		Emily			Rick	Aubry	Aubry	
Cirie	Jenna		Savannah				Charlie			Colby	Dee	Chrissy & Coach	Christian	Stephenie		Emily	Emily (Note: This player played an extra vote advantage and was able to cast two ballots during a single vote.)	Emily	Emily (Note: The extra vote advantage carried over into the revote, allowing this player to cast two ballots once more.)		Rick	Aubry		
Rick	Jenna		Savannah				Rizo		Genevieve		Dee	Chrissy & Coach	Ozzy	None (Note: This player lost a vote as another player used a vote stealer advantage.)		Cirie		Cirie			None (Note: This player played the Shot in the Dark, and as a result, had to sacrifice that night's vote.)			
Ozzy	Jenna		Savannah	Q	Angelina	Angelina		Exiled			Tiffany	Chrissy & Coach	Rick	Stephenie						Aubry				
Emily	Jenna		Savannah	Q	Mike	Angelina				Colby	Dee	Chrissy & Coach	Ozzy	Stephenie		Cirie		Cirie						
Stephenie				Angelina	Mike	Angelina		Kamilla			Tiffany	Chrissy & Coach	Rick	Aubry	Aubry (Note: This player used a vote stealer advantage and was able to cast two ballots during a single vote.)									
Christian	Jenna		Savannah	Q	Mike	Angelina			Genevieve		Dee	Chrissy & Coach	Christian (Note: Christian was forced to vote against himself after failing an attempt to gain an advantage.)											
Coach										Colby	Tiffany	None												
Chrissy								Kamilla			Dee	Emily & Rizo												
Dee							Charlie			Colby	None													
Colby										None (Note: This player lost a vote attempting to gain an advantage.)														
Genevieve									None															
Kamilla							Charlie	Chrissy																
Charlie							Rizo																	
Angelina				Q	Emily	Stephenie																		
Mike				Q	Emily																			
Q				None																				
Savannah	Jenna		Ozzy																					
Kyle		Evacuated																						
Jenna	Cirie																							

Jury vote
Episode	13		
Day	26		
Finalist	Aubry	Jonathan	Joe
Votes	8–3–0		
Juror	Vote		
Rizo	Yes		
Tiffany	Yes		
Cirie	Yes		
Rick	Yes		
Ozzy	Yes		
Emily	Yes		
Stephenie		Yes	
Christian	Yes		
Coach		Yes	
Chrissy		Yes	
Dee	Yes		

== Production ==
On December 15, 2023, Manoa Kamikamica, the Fijian Minister of Commerce, Trade, Tourism and Transport, announced that the Fijian Parliament had renewed its contract with Survivor for an additional two years. On April 27, 2024, Jeff Probst announced that the 50th season would feature returning players. Filming began on June 6, 2025. The premiere episode ran for three hours. It is the fifteenth season to feature returning players, and the sixth to feature a cast consisting entirely of returning players, following All-Stars, Heroes vs. Villains, Cambodia, Game Changers, and Winners at War.

With 24 contestants, this is also the largest cast the show has had to date. In addition, several celebrity fans got involved with the game this season. Country music singer Zac Brown and YouTube personality MrBeast made appearances on the island as part of tribal rewards and advantages; musician Billie Eilish and Tonight Show host Jimmy Fallon had their names attached to special advantages used this season; and pop singer Sia inspired the Fan Favorite prize awarded following the season finale.

Before the filming of the season, the Survivor production team hosted a series of challenges for season 2 of the Amazon Prime Video reality series Beast Games, with Jeff Probst appearing as a co-host as part of the crossover. The series also featured a number of former Survivor contestants. Also as part of the crossover, Beast Games presenter Jimmy "MrBeast" Donaldson appeared on the tenth episode of Survivor 50 as a celebrity fan, introducing a twist that would lead to the US$1 million prize pot being increased to $2 million.

=== Public vote ===
On February 22, 2025, Probst announced the season as Survivor 50: In the Hands of the Fans. For the first time ever, viewers were given the opportunity to vote on game mechanics and production choices that would appear on the season. Voting began on February 26, 2025, during the premiere of Survivor 48. Unlike the voting for Survivor: Cambodia, in which viewers could cast up to 20 votes per day for up to 15 days to determine the cast of that season, fans were only able to cast one vote per ballot question, and all the questions were spread out over four non-consecutive weeks during the airing of Survivor 48.

The following questions were put to a vote by Survivor producers:

In the Hands of the Fans vote
Date	Subject matter	Options			Episode revealed	References
February 26, 2025	Tribe colors	Blue, orange, and green	Orange, teal, and magenta	Green, red, and yellow	1	
February 26, 2025	Rice	Give them rice! (40%)		Make players earn it! (60%)	1	
February 26, 2025	Final four fire-making	Keep it (60%)		Lose it (40%)	13	
February 26, 2025	Vote reveal & reunion	Do it live in Los Angeles!		Keep it in Fiji!	13	
March 19, 2025	Final four challenge	Pinball Wizard	The Obstacle Course	Simmotion (43%)	13	
March 19, 2025	Advantages	Minimal power	Strategic power	Dynamic power	1	
March 19, 2025	Tribe switch	Yes (78%)		No (22%)	3	
April 16, 2025	Immunity necklace	Design A (a medallion) (16%)		Design B (a decorative bird) (84%)	6	
April 16, 2025	Tribe supplies	Give them their camp supplies! (47%)		Make them earn their camp supplies! (53%)	1	
April 16, 2025	Twists	I don't like twists - keep them rare! (37%)		I love twists - bring them on! (63%)	6	
May 14, 2025	Idols	No (20%)		Yes (80%)	1	

Winner (Percentage has been included when cited)

=== Celebrity involvement ===
In addition to the public vote from viewers, the season also featured involvement from a number of celebrities. Several game twists this season were introduced by celebrity fans,

Celebrity twists
Episode introduced	Conceived by	Twist	Effect
1	Billie Eilish	Boomerang Idol	This immunity idol found in the pre-merge had to be gifted to a player on another tribe. When gifted, the Idol could be used and held only by the player to whom it was gifted. If the player were to be voted out with the Idol, it would become a fully powered Idol and return to the castaway who originally found it, provided that this castaway was still in the game.
4	Zac Brown	Celebrity Reward	The winning tribe of Day 9's reward/immunity challenge won a trip to the Survivor Sanctuary for an outing with Zac Brown, who performed a private concert there and a meal that he prepared.
9	Jimmy Fallon	Beat Jeff Side Bet	For the immunity challenge, Jeff asked five players to make a side bet to outlast him in the challenge. If all of the selected players outlasted him, they would win a reward of rice for the tribe. If he beat even just one of them, Jeff would keep the rice. After a negotiation, Jeff allowed only four players to participate instead of five.
9	Jimmy Fallon	One in the Urn	On Day 18, one player went on a journey and performed a challenge. If successful in the challenge, one would be allowed to secretly cast an extra vote before going to Tribal Council, and would also be given the choice to either cast another vote at that same Tribal Council or save it for a future Tribal Council, up until the Final Seven. If unsuccessful, one would be forced to cast a single vote against oneself at that night's Tribal Council.
10	MrBeast	Super Beware Advantage	At the Survivor Auction on Day 19, all of the Final Ten players purchased the final item offered, which turned out to be: their loved ones' letters, and an announcement from MrBeast himself. At Tribal Council, MrBeast announced that one player would participate in a coin flip. If they called the flip correctly, that player becomes immune from that night’s vote and is given an Immunity Idol. Additionally, the prize money for the season would be doubled to $2 million. However, if the call was incorrect, that player would be instantly eliminated, and no vote would take place at Tribal Council.
13	Sia	Fan Favorite Prize	Reintroduced the viewer vote to award $100,000 to be awarded at the Finale (last seen during Survivor: Caramoan)

=== Fan Favorite vote ===
During the penultimate episode on May 13, 2026, one final fan vote was announced. Fans began to vote for their favorite player of the season and the winner of this prize was revealed during the live finale on May 20, 2026. The Fan Favorite award was decided by a fan vote which began one week before the finale, similar to the method by which the former "Sprint Player of the Season" award was decided every season from Survivor: China to Survivor: Caramoan.

Date	Topic	Winner	References
May 13, 2026	Sia Fan Favorite Prize	Cirie Fields	

=== Casting ===
In casting this season, Probst stated, "We want a cast that represents all types of players, spanning all the eras. An array of people who have slept bled this ever-changing game design for the last 25 years. Because, really, Survivor 50 is a representation of everyone who has ever played and the fans who've been with us for the entire time." In August 2024, Probst stated that the casting team started with a list of 200 previous players and had narrowed it down to 100 by that point in time. When asked by Dalton Ross in October 2024 about players potentially in the casting pool taking offers for shows on other networks including Australian Survivor and The Traitors, Probst said "We've had many players call us and say, 'I only want to do Survivor again.' That also makes an impression on us. We take note of that loyalty, and we appreciate it. But we definitely don't demand it." By February 2025, the list was whittled down to 50. Following the cast reveal on May 28, 2025, Probst said:

Casting Survivor 50 was kind of like casting the ultimate all-time movie. And you think about all the actors who are alive today that you could put in that movie, but there is only so many roles, and we wanted Fifty to be a little taste of everything. 'Cause...we've done Heroes vs. Villains, and Game Changers, and Fans vs. Favorites, and Winners. We wanted to taste every flavor, every type personality, all the eras.

The first 22 (out of 24) players in the cast were officially revealed by Probst on the May 28, 2025, edition of CBS Mornings. The final two cast members, both from Survivor 49 which had yet to air, would not be revealed until after that season's finale on December 17. Five-time Survivor player "Boston Rob" Mariano was one of the castaways contacted for this season, but he declined, saying that he was taking a hiatus from competitive reality shows. Amanda Kimmel from Survivor: China, Survivor: Micronesia and Survivor: Heroes vs. Villains was similarly contacted to be on the season but declined due to scheduling issues.

Contestants that were reportedly in consideration but cut include: Spencer Bledsoe from Survivor: Cagayan and Survivor: Cambodia, Rob Cesternino from Survivor: The Amazon and Survivor: All-Stars, Rome Cooney from Survivor 47, Tevin Davis from Survivor 46, Jessica "Figgy" Figueroa from Survivor: Millennials vs. Gen X, Abi-Maria Gomes from Survivor: Philippines and Survivor: Cambodia, Jesse Lopez from Survivor 43, Jerri Manthey from Survivor: The Australian Outback, Survivor: All-Stars, and Survivor: Heroes vs. Villains, Jonathan Penner from Survivor: Cook Islands, Survivor: Micronesia, and Survivor: Philippines, Sean Rector from Survivor: Marquesas, Davie Rickenbacker from Survivor: David vs. Goliath, Natalie Tenerelli from Survivor: Redemption Island, and Carolyn Wiger from Survivor 44.

In the Hands of the Fans is the first season to not follow the CBS diversity initiative, since its introduction in Survivor 41, which required at least half the cast to be Black, Indigenous, and People of Color (BIPOC), with only between 10 and 11 out of the 24 players being of a BIPOC background. This aligns with the decision by CBS to nebulously discontinue the casting diversity initiative, amid broader discussions to roll back diversity, equity, and inclusion policies in April 2025. Despite the hypothetical change in policy, Jesse Tannenbaum (casting director for all of CBS's reality shows) stated:

Well, from my perspective, nothing's changed. I've always, in the back of my mind, felt we needed more diversity on these shows...I'm still shooting for having a really diverse cast because I think everybody needs to be represented.

In addition to the various past appearances of the contestants on Survivor and other reality shows, the series notably reunites Cirie Fields and Stephenie LaGrossa Kendrick, who competed against each other on Snake in the Grass and The Traitors, which aired in mid 2022 and early 2023, respectively. Fields also competed internationally on Australian Survivor: Australia V The World.

=== Marketing ===
DQ-FAM, the Fiji Airways airplane used to market Survivor 50 (seen in 2026)

In the lead-up to the season, Fiji Airways announced that it would create an Airbus A350 Survivor 50-branded plane with its registration DQ-FAM, in conjunction with a sweepstakes that awarded fans with a trip to Fiji during this season's filming.

==== Survivor 50 Challenge ====
On January 30, 2026, the series launched a national scavenger hunt with 50 immunity idols hidden in each of the 50 U.S. states with each person who finds an idol entered into a grand prize sweepstakes to attend the live finale in Los Angeles.

==== The Road to 50 ====
On weeknights from February 9–20, 2026, CBS broadcast "The Road to 50"—a selection of 10 Survivor episodes from past seasons highlighting contestants appearing in Survivor 50. These reruns served as a counterprogramming effort for the 2026 Winter Olympics on NBC.

The Road to 50 Episodes
Season	Episode	Airdate	Featured Castaway(s)
Survivor: Micronesia	"If It Smells Like a Rat, Give It Cheese"	February 9, 2026	Cirie Fields, Oscar "Ozzy" Lusth^{‡}
Survivor: Tocantins	"The Martyr Approach"	February 10, 2026	Benjamin "Coach" Wade
Survivor: Heroes vs. Villains	"Slay Everyone, Trust No One"	February 11, 2026	Colby Donaldson, Cirie Fields, Stephenie LaGrossa Kendrick, Benjamin "Coach" Wade
Survivor: South Pacific	"Loyalties Will Be Broken"	February 12, 2026	Oscar "Ozzy" Lusth, Benjamin "Coach" Wade
Survivor: Heroes vs. Healers vs. Hustlers	"The Survivor Devil"	February 13, 2026	Chrissy Hofbeck
Survivor: David vs. Goliath	"Jackets and Eggs"	February 16, 2026	Christian Hubicki, Angelina Keeley, Mike White
Survivor: Edge of Extinction	"Awkward"	February 17, 2026	Aubry Bracco^{‡}, Rick Devens
Survivor 45	"The Ex-Girlfriend at the Wedding"	February 18, 2026	Emily Flippen^{‡}, Dee Valladares
Survivor 46	"Hide 'N Seek"	February 19, 2026	Quintavius "Q" Burdette, Charlie Davis, Tiffany Ervin
Survivor 48	"Icarus Time"	February 20, 2026	Kyle Fraser, Joe Hunter, Kamilla Karthigesu

^{‡} Only appeared as a member of the jury

== Reception ==
Survivor columnist Dalton Ross of Entertainment Weekly ranked Survivor 50: In the Hands of the Fans 16th best season of the series and the best new era season, with praise for the return of old school legends and how they intermingled with newer favorites. He also thought some of the twists such as the Mr. Beast and Rick Devens and the paired double elimination were huge successes. Ross added that the post-merge was "fantastic" and called Bracco's win, "so dramatically satisfying after her topsy-turvy decade long run." Nick Caruso of TV Line ranked Survivor 50: In the Hands of the Fans as the 19th best season and called it, "massively entertaining season that dared to be different and delivered on all fronts." Caruso also praised the interaction between the old-school players and newer standouts along with the Mr. Beast and Devens twist, but he thought the season's insistence on including celebrities was a "mixed bag". "The Purple Rock Podcast" ranked it as the 15th best season.

== Reunion show gaffe ==
For the first time since Survivor: Edge of Extinction, the finale featured a live reunion. Rather than airing it after the Final Tribal Council, the reunion was embedded throughout the finale itself. At several key points during the episode, Jeff Probst was joined on stage by contestants from season 50 to discuss the events as they unfolded on screen.

One segment, which aired between the Final Immunity Challenge and the Fire-making Challenge, featured Probst speaking with finalist Rizo Velovic about his fire-making abilities. During the discussion, Probst accidentally spoiled the outcome of the challenge before it aired by referring to Velovic as the final member of the jury. After returning from the commercial break, Probst acknowledged the mistake and joked:

"I love doing live television. In case you're confused, this is what happened. We were going to show you fire-making and then have the loser of fire-making, Rizo, come out and talk about if he had practiced fire-making maybe he would've won. Instead, we did a Survivor twist, it's the last twist of the season! We call it, 'A Peek Into The Future.' So now, we're going to watch Rizo lose in a fire to Jonathan!"

Probst later admitted that he and production had gotten ahead of themselves.
