= List of Survivor (American TV series) contestants (seasons 41–present) =

Airings of the CBS reality series from 2000 to 2010

Survivor is an American reality television show, based on the Swedish program Expedition Robinson. Contestants are referred to as "castaways", and they compete against one another to become the "Sole Survivor" and win one million U.S. dollars. First airing in 2000, there currently have been a total of 50 seasons aired and a 51st upcoming. The program itself has been filmed on five continents.

Contestants usually apply to be on the show, but the series has been known to recruit contestants for various seasons. For Survivor: Fiji, the producers had hoped to have a more racially diverse cast, and hoped that a more diverse group would apply after the success of the racially segregated Survivor: Cook Islands. When this did not happen, the producers turned to recruiting and in the end, only one contestant had actually submitted an application to be on the show. For the most part, contestants are virtually unknown prior to their Survivor appearance, but occasionally some well-known people are cast.

A total of 772 participants (castaways) have competed so far (as of Survivor 51). 120 of those participants have competed in multiple seasons: 89 of them have competed in two seasons, 20 have competed in three seasons, eight have competed in four seasons, and three have competed in five seasons of the show. Fifteen seasons have featured or will feature returning players: six with all-returnees (Survivor: All-Stars in 2004, Survivor: Heroes vs. Villains in 2010, Survivor: Cambodia in 2015, Survivor: Game Changers in 2017, Survivor: Winners at War in 2020 and Survivor 50: In the Hands of the Fans in 2026), six with one to four returning players on tribes with new players (Survivor: Guatemala in 2005, Survivor: Redemption Island and Survivor: South Pacific in 2011, Survivor: Philippines in 2012, Survivor: Edge of Extinction in 2019 and Survivor 45 in 2023), two with a tribe of ten returning "Favorites" facing off against a tribe of ten "Fans" (Survivor: Micronesia in 2008 and Survivor: Caramoan in 2013), and one featuring a tribe of ten returning players playing against a tribe of their family members (Survivor: Blood vs. Water in 2013). Additionally, five contestants (Russell Hantz, Sandra Diaz-Twine, Cirie Fields, Parvati Shallow, Tony Vlachos) have competed on international editions of the series (namely, Australian Survivor, with Fields, Shallow and Vlachos competing on the international cross-over season, Australian Survivor: Australia V The World).

On two occasions, contestants have been cast but ultimately withdrew before the game began without being replaced: a 20th contestant, model agency owner Mellisa McNulty from West Hollywood, California, was originally cast in Survivor: Fiji, but dropped out and returned home the night before the show began because of panic attacks, while in Survivor: San Juan del Sur, the 19th and 20th contestants, sisters So and Doo Kim, were removed just before filming due to a medical emergency. So would later appear on the following season Survivor: Worlds Apart. Fiji, San Juan del Sur and Survivor 51 proceeded with an uneven gender balance.

== Key legend ==
Table key

^ Contestant played the game for a second time
◊ Contestant played the game for a third time
o Contestant played the game for a fourth time
‡ Contestant played the game for a fifth time

== Seasons 41–50 (2021–2026) ==
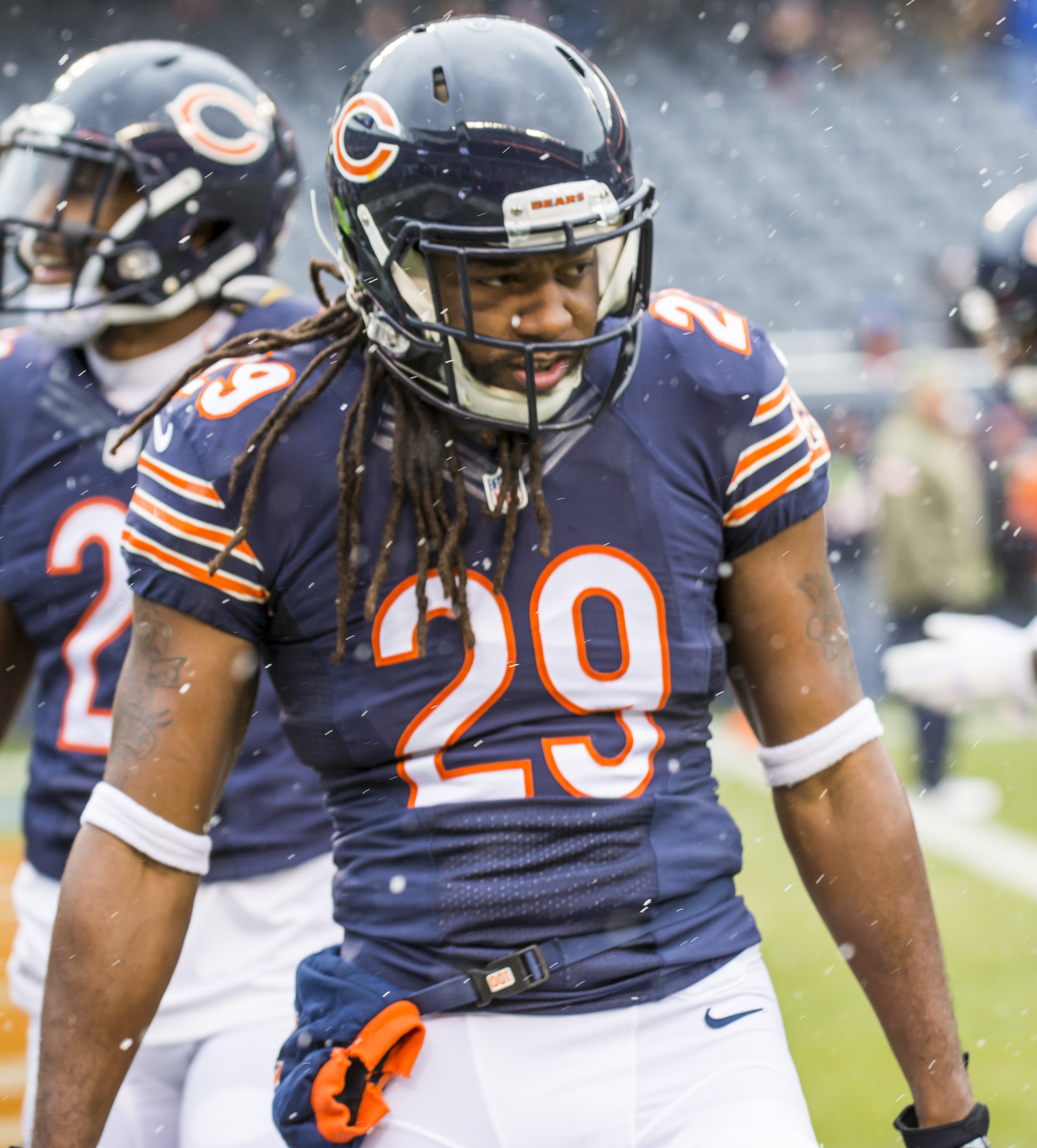
Danny McCray, Survivor 41

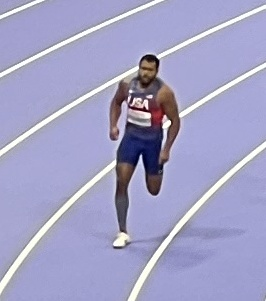
Ryan Medrano, Survivor 43

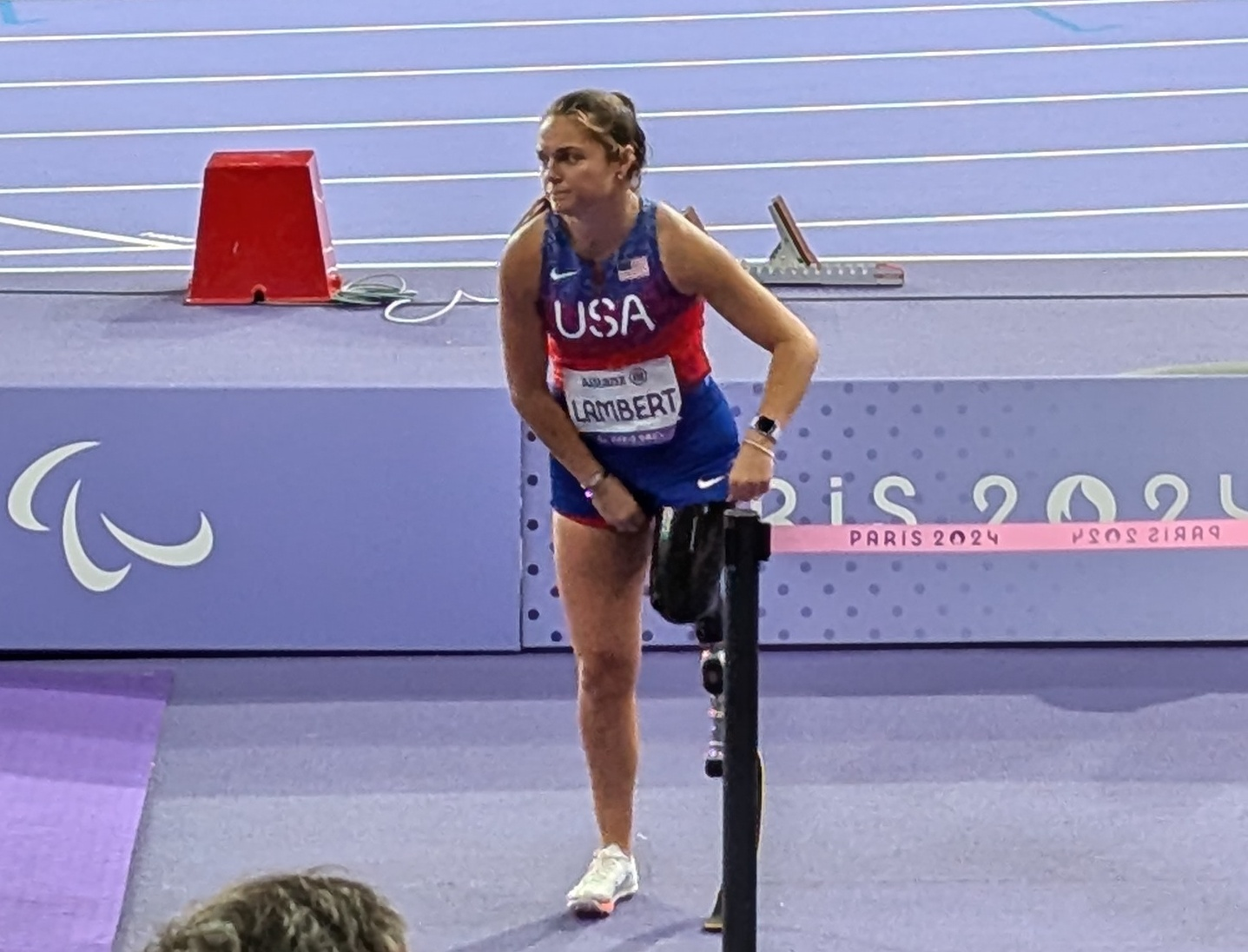
Noelle Lambert, Survivor 43

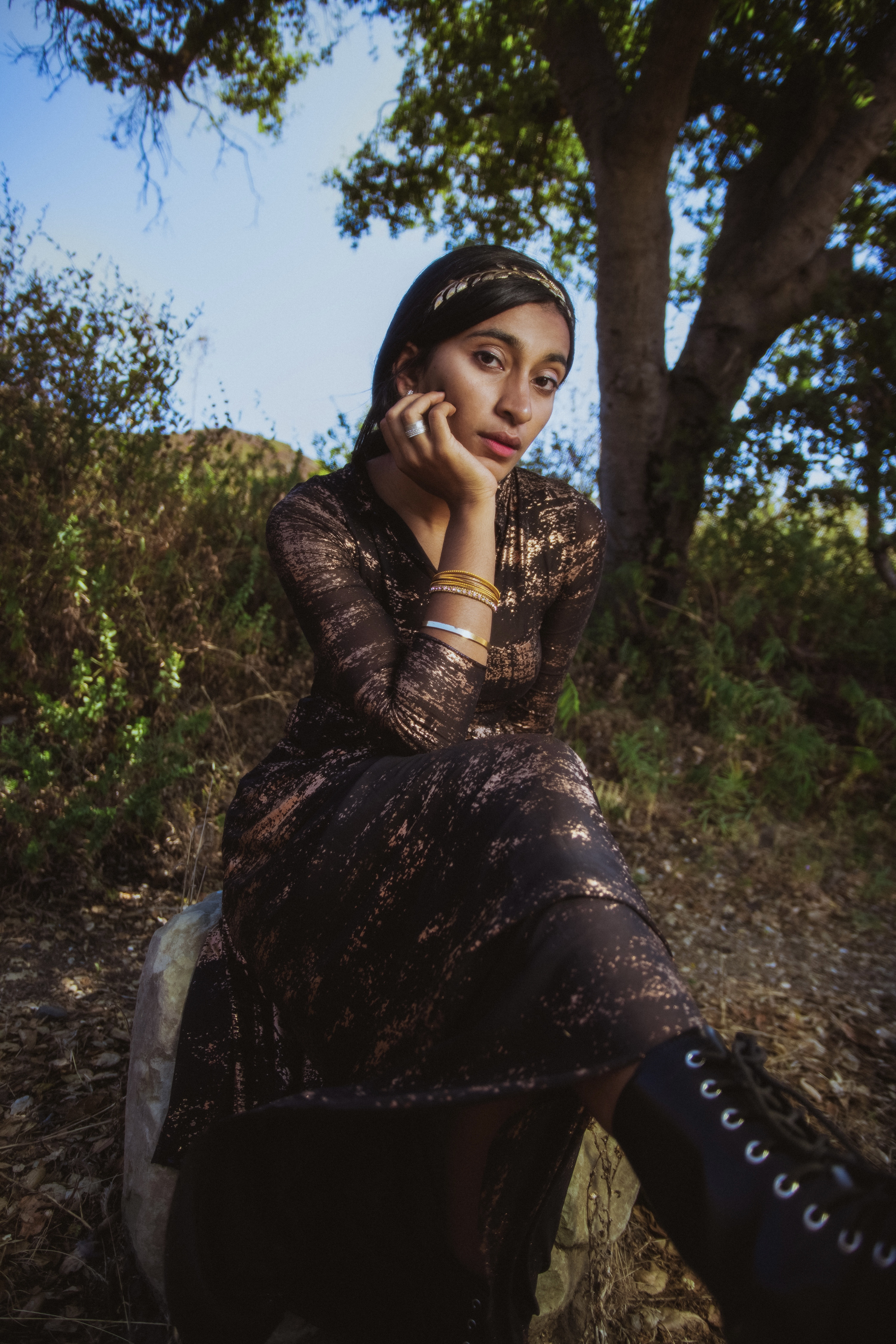
J. Maya, Survivor 45

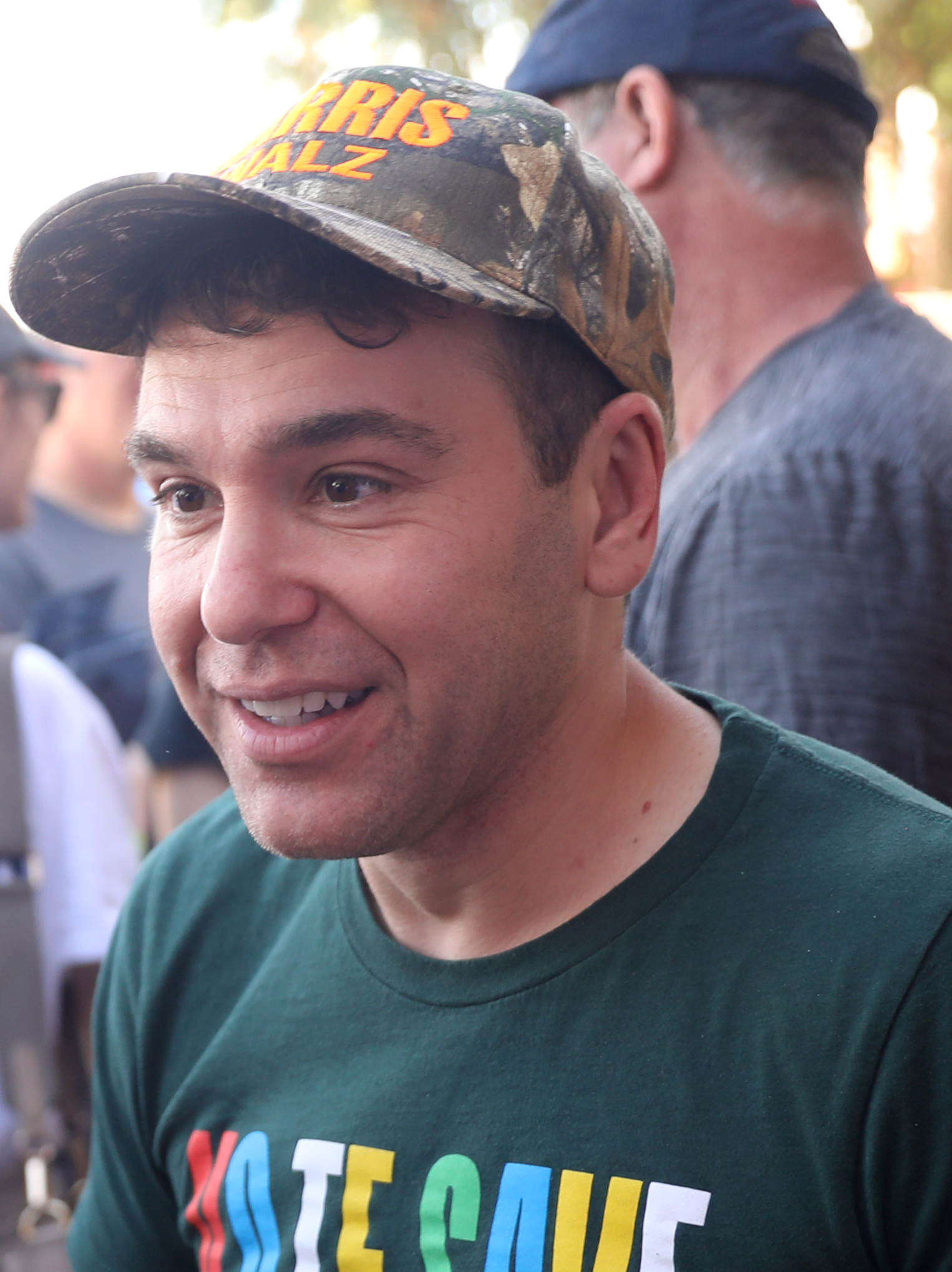
Jon Lovett, Survivor 47

All information is accurate as of the time the season was filmed, and thus may vary from season to season for returning players.

Name	Age	Hometown	Profession	Season	Finish
Eric Abraham	51	San Antonio, TX	Cyber Security Analyst	Survivor 41	18th
Sara Wilson	24	Boston, MA	Healthcare Consultant	Survivor 41	17th
David Voce	35	Chicago, IL	Neurosurgeon	Survivor 41	16th
Brad Reese	50	Shawnee, WY	Rancher	Survivor 41	15th
Jairus "JD" Robinson	20	Oklahoma City, OK	College Student	Survivor 41	14th
Genie Chen	46	Portland, OR	Grocery Clerk	Survivor 41	13th
Sydney Segal	26	Brooklyn, NY	Law Student	Survivor 41	12th
Tiffany Seely	47	Plainview, NY	Teacher	Survivor 41	11th
Naseer Muttalif	37	Morgan Hill, CA	Sales Manager	Survivor 41	10th
Evelyn "Evvie" Jagoda	28	Arlington, MA	PhD Student	Survivor 41	9th
Shantel "Shan" Smith	34	Washington, DC	Pastor	Survivor 41	8th
Liana Wallace	20	Washington, DC	College Student	Survivor 41	7th
Danny McCray	33	Frisco, TX	Ex-NFL Player	Survivor 41	6th
Ricard Foyé	31	Sedro-Woolley, WA	Flight Attendant	Survivor 41	5th
Heather Aldret	52	Charleston, SC	Stay-at-Home Mom	Survivor 41	4th
Alexander "Xander" Hastings	21	Chicago, IL	App Developer	Survivor 41	2nd Runner-up
Deshawn Radden	26	Miami, FL	Medical Student	Survivor 41	Runner-up
Erika Casupanan	32	Toronto, ON (Canada)	Communications Manager	Survivor 41	Winner
Jackson Fox	48	Houston, TX	Healthcare Worker	Survivor 42	18th
Zachary "Zach" Wurtenberger	22	St. Louis, MO	Student	Survivor 42	17th
Marya Sherron	47	Noblesville, IN	Stay-at-Home Mom	Survivor 42	16th
Jenny Kim	43	Brooklyn, NY	Creative Director	Survivor 42	15th
Swati Goel	19	Palo Alto, CA	Ivy League Student	Survivor 42	14th
Daniel Strunk	30	New Haven, CT	Law Clerk	Survivor 42	13th
Lydia Meredith	22	Santa Monica, CA	Waitress	Survivor 42	12th
Chanelle Howell	29	New York, NY	Executive Recruiter	Survivor 42	11th
Rocksroy Bailey	44	Las Vegas, NV	Stay-at-Home Dad	Survivor 42	10th
Tori Meehan	25	Rogers, AR	Therapist	Survivor 42	9th
Hai Giang	29	New Orleans, LA	Data Scientist	Survivor 42	8th
Andrea "Drea" Wheeler	35	Montreal, QC (Canada)	Fitness Consultant	Survivor 42	7th
Omar Zaheer	31	Whitby, ON (Canada)	Veterinarian	Survivor 42	6th
Lindsay Dolashewich	31	Asbury Park, NJ	Dietitian	Survivor 42	5th
Jonathan Young	29	Gulf Shores, AL	Beach Service Company Owner	Survivor 42	4th
Romeo Escobar	37	Norwalk, CA	Pageant Coach	Survivor 42	2nd Runner-up
Michael "Mike" Turner	58	Hoboken, NJ	Retired Firefighter	Survivor 42	Runner-up
Maryanne Oketch	24	Ajax, ON (Canada)	Seminary Student	Survivor 42	Winner
Morriah Young	28	Philadelphia, PA	Teacher	Survivor 43	18th
Justine Brennan	29	Marina del Ray, CA	Cyber Security Saleswoman	Survivor 43	17th
Nneka Ejere	43	Weatherford, TX	Pharmacist	Survivor 43	16th
Lindsay Carmine	42	Downingtown, PA	Pediatric Nurse	Survivor 43	15th
Geo Bustamante	35	Honolulu, HI	Project Manager	Survivor 43	14th
Elisabeth "Elie" Scott	31	Salt Lake City, UT	Clinical Psychologist	Survivor 43	13th
Dwight Moore	22	Collierville, TN	Graduate Student	Survivor 43	12th
Jeanine Zheng	24	San Francisco, CA	UX Designer	Survivor 43	11th
James Jones	37	Philadelphia, PA	Event Planner	Survivor 43	10th
Ryan Medrano	24	El Paso, TX	Warehouse Associate	Survivor 43	9th
Noelle Lambert	25	Manchester, NH	Paralympian	Survivor 43	8th
Sami Layadi	19	Las Vegas, NV	Pet Cremator	Survivor 43	7th
Cody Assenmacher	35	Honolulu, HI	Elevator Salesman	Survivor 43	6th
Karla Cruz Godoy	28	Newark, DE	Educational Project Manager	Survivor 43	5th
Jesse Lopez	30	Durham, NC	Political Science PhD	Survivor 43	4th
Owen Knight	29	New Orleans, LA	College Admissions Director	Survivor 43	2nd Runner-up
Cassidy Clark	26	Austin, TX	Designer	Survivor 43	Runner-up
Mike Gabler	52	Meridian, ID	Heart Valve Specialist	Survivor 43	Winner
Bruce Perreault	46	West Warwick, RI	Insurance Agent	Survivor 44	18th
Maddy Pomilla	28	Huntingtown, MD	Charity Projects Manager	Survivor 44	17th
Helen Li	29	San Francisco, CA	Product Manager	Survivor 44	16th
Claire Rafson	25	Highland Park, IL	Tech Investor	Survivor 44	15th
Sarah Wade	27	Rochester, MN	Management Consultant	Survivor 44	14th
Matthew Grinstead-Mayle	43	Pickerington, OH	Barbershop Owner	Survivor 44	13th
Josh Wilder	34	Cincinnati, OH	Surgical Podiatrist	Survivor 44	12th
Matthew "Matt" Blankinship	27	Albany, CA	Security Software Engineer	Survivor 44	11th
Brandon Cottom	30	Newtown, PA	Security Specialist	Survivor 44	10th
Kane Fritzler	25	Moose Jaw, SK (Canada)	Law Student	Survivor 44	9th
Frannie Marin	23	St. Paul, MN	Research Coordinator	Survivor 44	8th
Danny Massa	32	Bronx, NY	Firefighter	Survivor 44	7th
Jaime Lynn Ruiz	35	Mesa, AZ	Yogi	Survivor 44	6th
Lauren Harpe	31	Port Arthur, TX	Elementary School Teacher	Survivor 44	5th
Carson Garrett	20	Atlanta, GA	NASA Engineering Student	Survivor 44	4th
Carolyn Wiger	35	North St. Paul, MN	Drug Counselor	Survivor 44	2nd Runner-up
Heidi Lagares-Greenblatt	43	Pittsburgh, PA	Engineering Manager	Survivor 44	Runner-up
Yamil "Yam Yam" Arocho	36	Bayamón, Puerto Rico	Salon Owner	Survivor 44	Winner
Hannah Rose	33	Baltimore, MD	Therapist	Survivor 45	18th
Brandon Donlon	26	Sicklerville, NJ	Content Producer	Survivor 45	17th
Sabiyah Broderick	28	Jacksonville, NC	Truck Driver	Survivor 45	16th
Sean Edwards	35	Provo, UT	School Principal	Survivor 45	15th
Brandon "Brando" Meyer	23	Seattle, WA	Software Developer	Survivor 45	14th
Janani "J. Maya" Krishnan-Jha	24	Los Angeles, CA	Singer	Survivor 45	13th
Nicholas "Sifu" Alsup	30	O'Fallon, IL	Gym Owner	Survivor 45	12th
Kaleb Gebrewold	29	Vancouver, BC (Canada)	Software Sales	Survivor 45	11th
Kellie Nalbandian	29	New York City, NY	Critical Care Nurse	Survivor 45	10th
Kendra McQuarrie	31	Steamboat Springs, CO	Bartender	Survivor 45	9th
Bruce Perreault^{^}	47	West Warwick, RI	Insurance Agent	Survivor 45	8th
Emily Flippen	28	Laurel, MD	Investment Analyst	Survivor 45	7th
Drew Basile	23	Philadelphia PA	Grad Student	Survivor 45	6th
Julie Alley	49	Brentwood, TN	Estate Attorney	Survivor 45	5th
Katurah Topps	35	Brooklyn, NY	Civil Rights Attorney	Survivor 45	4th
Jake O'Kane	26	Boston, MA	Attorney	Survivor 45	2nd Runner-up
Austin Li Coon	26	Chicago, IL	Grad Student	Survivor 45	Runner-up
Dianelys "Dee" Valladares	26	Miami, FL	Entrepreneur	Survivor 45	Winner
David Jelinsky	22	Las Vegas, NV	Slot Machine Salesman	Survivor 46	18th
Jessica "Jess" Chong	37	San Francisco, CA	Software Engineer	Survivor 46	17th
Randen Montalvo	41	Orlando, FL	Aerospace Tech	Survivor 46	16th
Bhanu Gopal	41	Acton, MA	IT Quality Analyst	Survivor 46	15th
Jemila "Jem" Hussain-Adams	31	Chicago, IL	International Brand Mentor	Survivor 46	14th
Moriah Gaynor	28	San Diego, CA	Program Coordinator	Survivor 46	13th
Tim Spicer	31	Atlanta, GA	College Coach	Survivor 46	12th
Sodasia "Soda" Thompson	27	Lake Hopatcong, NJ	Special Ed Teacher	Survivor 46	11th
Tevin Davis	24	Richmond, VA	Actor	Survivor 46	10th
Hunter McKnight	28	French Camp, MS	Science Teacher	Survivor 46	9th
Tiffany Nicole Ervin	33	Elizabeth, NJ	Artist	Survivor 46	8th
Venus Vafa	24	Toronto, ON (Canada)	Data Analyst	Survivor 46	7th
Quintavius "Q" Burdette	29	Memphis, TN	Real Estate Agent	Survivor 46	6th
Maria Shrime Gonzalez	48	Dallas, TX	Parent Coach	Survivor 46	5th
Liz Wilcox	35	Orlando, FL	Marketing Strategist	Survivor 46	4th
Ben Katzman	31	Miami, FL	Musician	Survivor 46	2nd Runner-up
Charlie Davis	26	Boston, MA	Law Student	Survivor 46	Runner-up
Kenzie Petty	29	Charlotte, NC	Salon Owner	Survivor 46	Winner
Jon Lovett	42	Los Angeles, CA	Podcast Host	Survivor 47	18th
Terran "TK" Foster	31	Upper Marlboro, MD	Athlete Marketing Manager	Survivor 47	17th
Aysha Welch	32	Houston, TX	IT Consultant	Survivor 47	16th
Kishan Patel	28	San Francisco, CA	ER Doctor	Survivor 47	15th
Anika Dhar	26	Los Angeles, CA	Marketing Manager	Survivor 47	14th
Jerome "Rome" Cooney	30	Phoenix, AZ	E-Sports Commentator	Survivor 47	13th
Tiyana Hallums	27	Aiea, HI	Flight Attendant	Survivor 47	12th
Sierra Wright	27	Phoenixville, PA	Nurse	Survivor 47	11th
Solomon "Sol" Yi	43	Norwalk, CT	Medical Device Sales	Survivor 47	10th
Gabe Ortis	26	Baltimore, MD	Radio Host	Survivor 47	9th
Kyle Ostwald	31	Cheboygan, MI	Construction Worker	Survivor 47	8th
Caroline Vidmar	27	Chicago, IL	Strategy Consultant	Survivor 47	7th
Andy Rueda	31	Brooklyn, NY	AI Research Assistant	Survivor 47	6th
Genevieve Mushaluk	33	Winnipeg, MB (Canada)	Corporate Lawyer	Survivor 47	5th
Teeny Chirichillo	24	Manahawkin, NJ	Freelance Writer	Survivor 47	4th
Sue Smey	59	Putnam Valley, NY	Flight School Owner	Survivor 47	2nd Runner-up
Sam Phalen	24	Nashville, TN	Sports Reporter	Survivor 47	Runner-up
Rachel LaMont	34	Southfield, MI	Graphic Designer	Survivor 47	Winner
Stephanie Berger	38	Brooklyn, NY	Tech Product Lead	Survivor 48	18th
Kevin Leung	34	Livermore, CA	Finance Manager	Survivor 48	17th
Justin Pioppi	29	Winthrop, MA	Pizzeria Manager	Survivor 48	16th
Thomas Krottinger	34	Los Angeles, CA	Music Executive	Survivor 48	15th
Bianca Roses	33	Arlington, VA	PR Consultant	Survivor 48	14th
Charity Nelms	34	St. Petersburg, FL	Flight Attendant	Survivor 48	13th
Saiounia "Sai" Hughley	30	Simi Valley, CA	Marketing Professional	Survivor 48	12th
Cedrek McFadden	45	Greenville, SC	Surgeon	Survivor 48	11th
Chrissy Sarnowsky	55	Chicago, IL	Fire Lieutenant	Survivor 48	10th
David Kinne	39	Buena Park, CA	Stunt Performer	Survivor 48	9th
Star Toomey	28	Augusta, GA	Sales Expert	Survivor 48	8th
Mary Zheng	31	Philadelphia, PA	Substance Abuse Counselor	Survivor 48	7th
Shauhin Davari	38	Costa Mesa, CA	Debate Professor	Survivor 48	6th
Mitch Guerra	34	Waco, TX	P.E. Coach	Survivor 48	5th
Kamilla Karthigesu	31	Foster City, CA	Software Engineer	Survivor 48	4th
Joe Hunter	45	Sacramento, CA	Fire Captain	Survivor 48	2nd Runner-up
Eva Erickson	24	Providence, RI	PhD Candidate	Survivor 48	Runner-up
Kyle Fraser	31	Brooklyn, NY	Attorney	Survivor 48	Winner
Nicole Mazullo	26	Philadelphia, PA	Financial Crime Consultant	Survivor 49	18th
Kimberly "Annie" Davis	49	Austin, TX	Musician	Survivor 49	17th
Jake Latimer	36	St. Albert, AB (Canada)	Correctional Officer	Survivor 49	16th
Jeremiah Ing	39	Toronto, ON (Canada)	Global Events Manager	Survivor 49	15th
Matt Williams	52	St. George, UT	Airport Ramp Agent	Survivor 49	14th
Jason Treul	32	Santa Ana, CA	Law Clerk	Survivor 49	13th
Shannon Fairweather	28	Boston, MA	Wellness Specialist	Survivor 49	12th
Nate Moore	47	Hermosa Beach, CA	Film Producer	Survivor 49	11th
Michelle "MC" Chukwujekwu	29	San Diego, CA	Fitness Trainer	Survivor 49	10th
Alex Moore	26	Washington, D.C.	Political Comms Director	Survivor 49	9th
Jawan Pitts	28	Los Angeles, CA	Video Editor	Survivor 49	8th
Sophie Segreti	31	New York, NY	Strategy Associate	Survivor 49	7th
Steven Ramm	35	Denver, CO	Rocket Scientist	Survivor 49	6th
Kristina Mills	36	Edmond, OK	MBA Career Coach	Survivor 49	5th
Rizo Velovic	25	Yonkers, NY	Tech Sales	Survivor 49	4th
Sage Ahrens-Nichols	30	Olympia, WA	Clinical Social Worker	Survivor 49	2nd Runner-up
Sophi Balerdi	27	Miami, FL	Entrepreneur	Survivor 49	Runner-up
Savannah Louie	31	Atlanta, GA	Former Reporter	Survivor 49	Winner
Jenna Lewis-Dougherty^{◊}	47	Woodland, CA	Realtor	Survivor 50: In the Hands of the Fans	24th
Kyle Fraser^{^}	31	Brooklyn, NY	Defense Attorney	Survivor 50: In the Hands of the Fans	23rd
Savannah Louie^{^}	31	Atlanta, GA	Communications & Marketing Specialist	Survivor 50: In the Hands of the Fans	22nd
Quintavius "Q" Burdette^{^}	31	Germantown, TN	Real Estate Broker	Survivor 50: In the Hands of the Fans	21st
Mike White^{^}	54	Santa Monica, CA	Filmmaker	Survivor 50: In the Hands of the Fans	20th
Angelina Keeley^{^}	35	San Diego, CA	Entrepreneur/Small Business Owner	Survivor 50: In the Hands of the Fans	19th
Charlie Davis^{^}	27	Boston, MA	Associate Attorney	Survivor 50: In the Hands of the Fans	18th
Kamilla Karthigesu^{^}	31	Foster City, CA	Software Engineer	Survivor 50: In the Hands of the Fans	17th
Genevieve Mushaluk^{^}	33	Winnipeg, MB (Canada)	Corporate Lawyer	Survivor 50: In the Hands of the Fans	16th
Colby Donaldson^{o}	51	Austin, TX	Rancher/Welder	Survivor 50: In the Hands of the Fans	15th
Dianelys "Dee" Valladares^{^}	28	Miami, FL	Entrepreneur	Survivor 50: In the Hands of the Fans	14th
Chrissy Hofbeck^{^}	54	The Villages, FL	Actuary	Survivor 50: In the Hands of the Fans	13th/12th
Benjamin "Coach" Wade^{o}	53	Susanville, CA	Music Teacher/Coach/Super Dad	Survivor 50: In the Hands of the Fans	13th/12th
Christian Hubicki^{^}	39	Tallahassee, FL	Robotics Professor	Survivor 50: In the Hands of the Fans	11th
Stephenie LaGrossa Kendrick^{o}	45	Dunedin, FL	Part Time Recess Monitor/Full Time Mom	Survivor 50: In the Hands of the Fans	10th
Emily Flippen^{^}	30	Laurel, MD	Investment Analyst	Survivor 50: In the Hands of the Fans	9th
Ozzy Lusth^{‡}	43	Guanajuato, GJ (Mexico)	Music Venue, Vinyl Bar, Restaurant Owner	Survivor 50: In the Hands of the Fans	8th
Rick Devens^{^}	41	Macon, GA	Communications Director	Survivor 50: In the Hands of the Fans	7th
Cirie Fields^{‡}	54	Jersey City, NJ	Registered Nurse	Survivor 50: In the Hands of the Fans	6th
Tiffany Nicole Ervin^{^}	34	Los Angeles, CA	Artist/Creative Producer	Survivor 50: In the Hands of the Fans	5th
Rizo Velovic^{^}	25	Yonkers, NY	Tech Sales	Survivor 50: In the Hands of the Fans	4th
Joe Hunter^{^}	45	West Sacramento, CA	Fire Captain	Survivor 50: In the Hands of the Fans	2nd Runner-up
Jonathan Young^{^}	32	Gulf Shores, AL	Beach Service Company Owner	Survivor 50: In the Hands of the Fans	Runner-up
Aubry Bracco^{o}	39	Hampton Falls, NH	Marketing Director	Survivor 50: In the Hands of the Fans	Winner

== Seasons 51–present (2026–present) ==
All information is accurate as of the time the season was filmed, and thus may vary from season to season for returning players.

Name	Age	Hometown	Profession	Season	Finish
Aaliyah Puglia	24	Providence, RI	Chef	Survivor 51	21st
Ana Sani	34	Toronto, ON (Canada)	Voice actress	Survivor 51	20th
Rob Antonson	40	Cumberland, RI	Airport Operations	Survivor 51	19th
Patt Cannaday	33	Washington, D.C.	Federal Prosecutor	Survivor 51	18th
Jenna Doore	30	Toledo, OH	Wedding Videographer	Survivor 51	17th
Alexis Levine	34	Atlanta, GA	Criminal Defense Attorney	Survivor 51	16th
Linnea Capobianco	25	Jersey City, NJ	Entrepreneur	Survivor 51	15th
Ori Jean-Charles	27	Spring Valley, NY	Personal Trainer	Survivor 51	14th
Brady Booker	27	Knoxville, TN	Pro Wrestler	Survivor 51	13th
Kristin Flickhinger	49	Santa Barbara, CA	Crisis management	Survivor 51	12th/11th
Danny Kilby	30	London, ON (Canada)	Game Studio Founder	Survivor 51	12th/11th
Lewis Kelly	28	Puerto Rico	Farmer	Survivor 51	10th
Cristian Chavez	26	Salt Lake City, UT	Human Resources Executive	Survivor 51	TBA
Sharonda Cox	34	Richmond, KY	OBGYN	Survivor 51	TBA
Carter Krull	24	Sioux Falls, SD	Livestock farmer	Survivor 51	TBA
Angelica "Jelly" Loblack	29	Bloomington, IN	Sociology Professor	Survivor 51	TBA
Eric Macksoud	34	Windsor Locks, CT	Mental Health Therapist	Survivor 51	TBA
Maggie Nestor	40	Charlestown, WV	Farmer	Survivor 51	TBA
An "Thien An" Nguyen	24	Fort Worth, TX	Medical Student	Survivor 51	TBA
Michael "Mike" Pinsky	32	New York City, NY	Baseball Operations	Survivor 51	TBA
Devin Way	33	Los Angeles, CA	Actor/Model	Survivor 51	TBA
