= Island of Love =

Island of Love may refer to:

- "Island of Love", a song from the Elvis Presley album Blue Hawaii
- Island of Love, the English-language name for Galešnjak in Croatia
- Island of Love (band), an English rock band formed in 2019

== Film ==
- Island of Love (1929 film), French film directed by Berthe Dagmar and Jean Durand
- The Island of Love, 1944 French film
- Island of Love (1963 film), American film directed by Morton DaCosta

== See also ==
- Love Island (disambiguation)
