= Lists of Survivor (American TV series) contestants =

Survivor is an American reality television show, based on the Swedish program Expedition Robinson. Contestants are referred to as "castaways", and they compete against one another to become the "Sole Survivor" and win one million U.S. dollars. First airing in 2000, there currently have been a total of fifty seasons aired and a 51st currently airing. The program itself has been filmed on five continents.

Contestants usually apply to be on the show, but the series has been known to recruit contestants for various seasons. For Survivor: Fiji, the producers had hoped to have a more racially diverse cast, and hoped that a more diverse group would apply after the success of the racially segregated Survivor: Cook Islands. When this did not happen, the producers turned to recruiting and in the end, only one contestant had actually submitted an application to be on the show. For the most part, contestants are virtually unknown prior to their Survivor appearance, but occasionally some well-known people are cast.

A total of 772 participants (castaways) have competed so far (as of Survivor 51). 120 of those participants have competed in multiple seasons: 89 of them have competed in two seasons, 20 have competed in three seasons, eight have competed in four seasons, and three have competed in five seasons of the show. Fifteen seasons have featured or will feature returning players: six with all-returnees (Survivor: All-Stars in 2004, Survivor: Heroes vs. Villains in 2010, Survivor: Cambodia in 2015, Survivor: Game Changers in 2017, Survivor: Winners at War in 2020 and Survivor 50: In the Hands of the Fans in 2026), six with one to four returning players on tribes with new players (Survivor: Guatemala in 2005, Survivor: Redemption Island and Survivor: South Pacific in 2011, Survivor: Philippines in 2012, Survivor: Edge of Extinction in 2019 and Survivor 45 in 2023), two with a tribe of ten returning "Favorites" facing off against a tribe of ten "Fans" (Survivor: Micronesia in 2008 and Survivor: Caramoan in 2013), and one featuring a tribe of ten returning players playing against a tribe of their family members (Survivor: Blood vs. Water in 2013). Additionally, five contestants (Russell Hantz, Sandra Diaz-Twine, Cirie Fields, Parvati Shallow, Tony Vlachos) have competed on international editions of the series (namely, Australian Survivor, with Fields, Shallow and Vlachos competing on the international cross-over season, Australian Survivor: Australia V The World).

On two occasions, contestants have been cast but ultimately withdrew before the game began without being replaced: a 20th contestant, model agency owner Mellisa McNulty from West Hollywood, California, was originally cast in Survivor: Fiji, but dropped out and returned home the night before the show began because of panic attacks, while in Survivor: San Juan del Sur, the 19th and 20th contestants, sisters So and Doo Kim, were removed just before filming due to a medical emergency.

== Lists ==
The whole list of contestants who appeared in the American edition of Survivor is split into the following:

- List of Survivor (American TV series) contestants (seasons 1–20)
- List of Survivor (American TV series) contestants (seasons 21–40)
- List of Survivor (American TV series) contestants (seasons 41–present)
