= Janani K. Jha =

American singer-songwriter (born 1998)

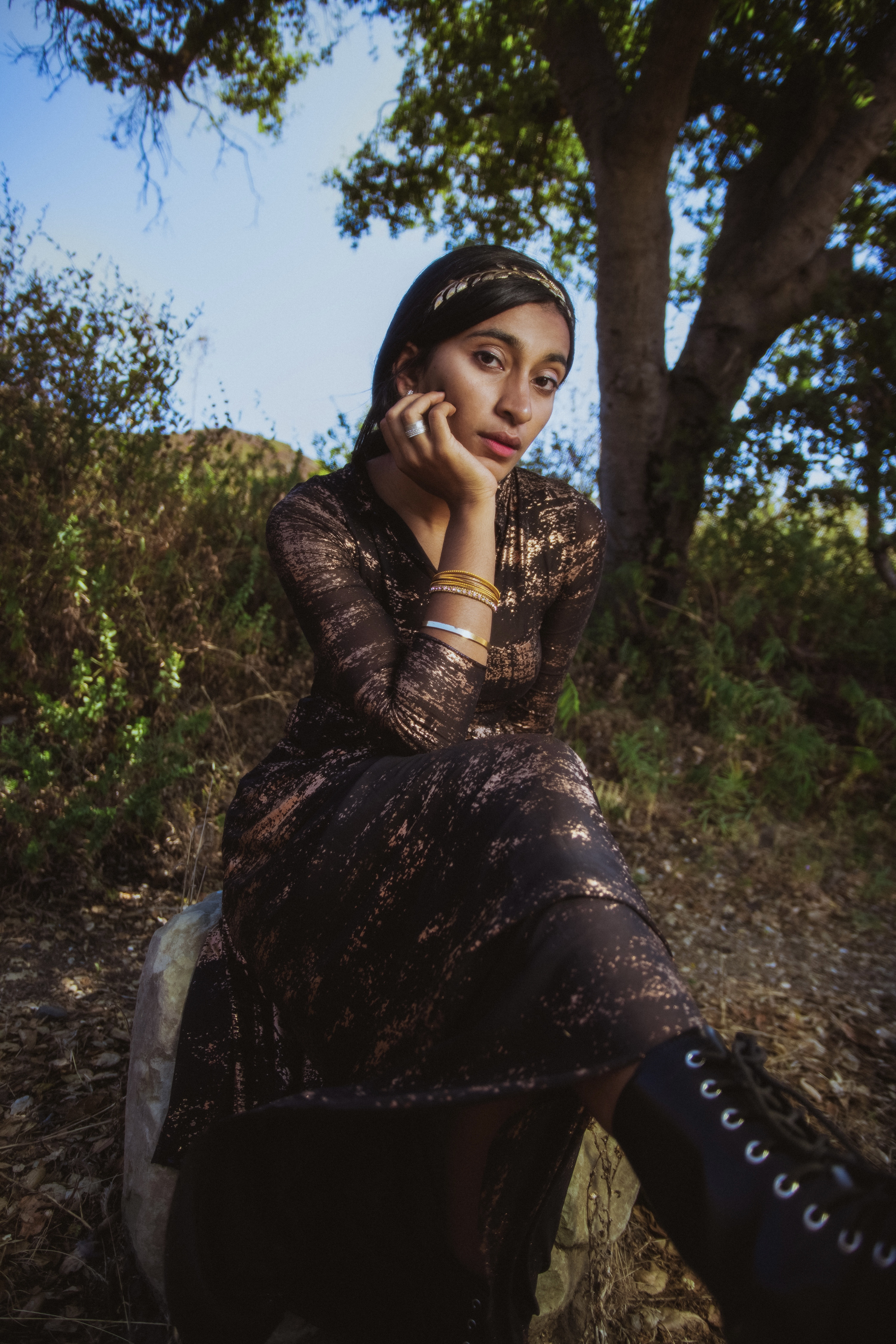
- Born: Janani Krishnan-Jha; October 5, 1998 (age 27)
- Other name: J. Maya
- Education: Harvard University
- Occupations: Singer-songwriter; Reality TV contestant
- Years active: 2021–present
- Works: Poetic License; The Rest of the Laurels
- Television: Survivor 45
- Musical career
- Origin: Los Angeles, California
- Genre: Indie pop
- Instruments: Piano; Keyboards; Vocals; Guitar; Sitar
- Label: Expand Music
- Website: www.jananikjha.com

Janani Krishnan-Jha (October 5, 1998), formerly known by the stage name J. Maya, is an American singer-songwriter. In 2023 she participated in Survivor 45, the 45th season of the American reality-TV competition series Survivor. The release of her debut single in 2021, "Achilles Heel", influenced by Greco-Roman mythology, garnered streams. Her debut EP, Poetic License, received positive reviews from media outlets in 2022. In 2024, she released her debut album, The Rest of the Laurels, with an accompanying novella Katathon.

== Early life and education ==
Krishnan-Jha was born in the United States to Indian Tamil parents. She grew up in the San Francisco Bay Area, where she attended San Mateo High School. There, she was captain of the Mock Trial Team, president of the Model UN, founder and president of the Speech & Debate Club, president/student director of the choir, executive member of the Renaissance Leadership Team, and publicity chair of the Writing Club. In 2015, she received the National Scholastic Award in Writing, which she accepted at Carnegie Hall. She also worked as an intern for United States House of Representatives member Jackie Speier (D-CA) while attending high school.

In 2016, Krishnan-Jha competed in the O. Henry Pun-Off World Championships in Austin, Texas. She was named MVP (Most Valuable Punster) of the competition. Shortly thereafter, she began attending Harvard University, where she served as a public service student representative for the Dunster House, for which she sang Claire Fridkin's parody of Juice (Lizzo song), "Moose!" During her time at Harvard, Krishnan-Jha also participated in the The Harvard-Radcliffe Veritones, where she had a solo cover recording of Troye Sivan's EASE. She graduated in 2020 with a B.A. cum laude in psychology. She stated in 2023 that she had been accepted into Harvard Law School, but turned the offer down to concentrate on her singing career.

== Career ==
In 2021, Krishnan-Jha released her first single, "Achilles Heel", which received more than 150,000 streams across platforms in the first three days of its release. She released the single under the pseudonym J. Maya in which the letter "J" is the initial for her first name "Janani" and "Maya" in Sanskrit means "illusion or magic" as music to her was "100% fantasy, my escape".

J. Maya's first EP, Poetic License, was released in 2022. The EP spawned four singles: "Library Card", "Sunday Crossword", "Machine Learning", and "Three Specters." Poetic License, as well as Krishnan-Jha's songwriting at large, has been recognized by media outlets like NME, Good Morning America, Uproxx, VOGUE India, Forbes, and Coup de Main, and music institutions such as The Recording Academy.

In 2023, Jha (under the name J. Maya) was one of 18 participants in Survivor 45, the 45th season of Survivor. She was voted out in the sixth episode, placing 13th and missing out on the jury. This opportunity greatly boosted Jha's streaming numbers on Spotify and drew eyes to her creative work.

In 2024, she dropped her stage name as she "wanted to bring a little bit of [herself]" into music. Under the name Janani K. Jha, she released her debut album, The Rest of the Laurels, a concept album inspired by Greco-Roman mythology, with each track representing a myth. The Rest of the Laurels peaked at #67 on the iTunes U.S. pop and pop charts. It peaked at #26 on the Canadian pop chart. Alongside this album, she wrote a companion novella, Katathon, which describes the nine levels of Hell noted in Dante's Inferno through the eyes of a modern-day Eurydice going through the dimension as part of a competition. Each chapter in Katathon is named after and is linked to a song in The Rest of the Laurels. Katathon peaked at #1 on Amazon Books' Greek Mythology Retellings for Young Adults Bestselling Chart.

On June 30, 2025, Krishnan-Jha's song Slow Burn was featured on Season 7, Episode 25 of Love Island Following, the song found new heights of notice on social media platforms such as TikTok and Reddit, causing streaming numbers to skyrocket.

== Musical style and influences ==
Krishnan-Jha cites Western literature and Greco-Roman mythology as influences on her music. She also lists pop artists Ariana Grande, Beyoncé, Katy Perry, and Taylor Swift as her favorite musical influences. Her musical style mixes elements of jazz with South Indian Carnatic music.

== Discography ==
=== Studio albums ===
- The Rest of the Laurels (as Janani K. Jha; 2024)
- The Rest of the Laurels: Epilogue (as Janani K. Jha; 2026)

=== Extended plays ===
- Poetic License (as J. Maya; 2022)
- Tales From Cazilor: Wyldflowers (as Janani K. Jha; 2025) - portraying Highblade Aurum
- Epic: The Wisdom Saga (as Janani K. Jha; 2024) - portraying Aphrodite in "God Games"

=== Singles ===
==== as J. Maya ====
- "Achilles Heel" (2021)
- "Thanatos (End of Us)" (2021)
- "Ms. Protagonist" (2021)
- "Library Card" (2022)
- "Golden Age" (2022)
- "Sunday Crossword" (2022)
- "Machine Learning" (2022)
- "Slow Burn" (2023)
- "The Maze" (2023)
- "Hellbent" (2023)

==== as Janani K. Jha ====
- "Gladiators" (2024)
- "Royal We" (2024)
- "Rainmaker (with Scott Hoying)" (2025)
- "Prometheus on the 405" (2025)
