= Love Island =

Love Island may refer to:

== Film ==
- Love Island (1952 film), an American film directed by Adam Lloyd starring Todd Wathen and Eva Gabor
- Love Island (2014 film), directed by Jasmila Žbanić

== Music ==
- Love Island (album), a 1978 album by Eumir Deodato
- "Love Island" (song), a 1998 song by Fatboy Slim from You've Come a Long Way, Baby
- Island of Love (band), formed under the name Love Island, an English rock band

== Television ==
- Love Island (franchise), a television reality franchise
  - Love Island (2005 TV series), a British reality television programme where twelve single celebrities spend five weeks on an island in Fiji
  - Love Island (2015 TV series), a British revival of the above series set in Mallorca
  - Love Island Adria, a 2026 Croatian-Serbian-Slovenian reality television programme based on the British version
  - Love Island Australia, a 2018 Australian reality television programme based on the British version
  - Love Island Sweden, a 2018 Swedish reality television program based on the British version
  - Love Island (American TV series), a 2019 American reality television program based on the British version
  - Love Island (German TV series), a German reality TV format that started in 2017 and is set on Mallorca and (since 2021) Teneriffe
- Love Island (The Morning Show), an episode of the American television series The Morning Show

== See also ==
- Fruit Love Island
