= Brandon Cottom =

American football player (born 1992)

No. 42
- Position: Fullback

Personal information
- Born: December 21, 1992 (age 33); Newtown, Pennsylvania
- Listed height: 6 ft 2 in (1.88 m)
- Listed weight: 262 lb (119 kg)

Career information
- High school: Newtown (PA) Council Rock North
- College: Purdue
- NFL draft: 2015: undrafted

Career history
- Seattle Seahawks (2015–2016); Salt Lake Stallions (2019)*; Philadelphia Soul (2019)
- * Offseason or practice squad member only
- Stats at Pro Football Reference

Brandon Tyler Cottom (born December 21, 1992) is an American former football fullback. He played college football at Purdue University. He competed on Survivor 44 in 2023.

== College career ==
Cottom committed to the Purdue Boilermakers football program on February 2, 2011. He played all four years with the Boilermakers, playing in 38 games over that span. Cottom scored 6 touchdowns, 436 rushing yards with an average of 5.7 yards per carry.

=== Statistics ===
Purdue Boilermakers
Season	Rushing					Receiving			Kickoff returns				
Season	Att	Yards	Avg	Yds/G	TD	Rec	Yards	TD	Att	Yards	Avg	TD	Long
2011	8	70	8.8	6.4	0	0	0	0	1	3	3.0	0	3
2012	23	209	9.1	16.1	2	7	79	2	0	0	--	0	--
2013	45	154	3.4	17.1	1	7	99	0	0	0	--	0	--
2014	1	3	3.0	0.6	0	2	10	1	4	43	10.8	0	15
Career	77	436	5.7	11.5	3	16	188	3	5	46	9.2	0	15

== Professional career ==
Pre-draft measurables
Height	Weight	Arm length	Hand span	40-yard dash	10-yard split	20-yard split	20-yard shuttle	Three-cone drill	Vertical jump	Broad jump	Bench press
6 ft 2 1/8 in (1.88 m)	262 lb (119 kg)	32 3/4 in (0.83 m)	10 1/4 in (0.26 m)	4.62 s	1.63 s	2.65 s	4.33 s	7.06 s	33.5 in (0.85 m)	9 ft 9 in (2.97 m)	22 reps
All values from Pro Day

=== Seattle Seahawks ===
On May 2, 2015, Cottom was signed by the Seahawks. On August 31, 2015, he was waived. On September 1, 2015, Cottom was placed on injured reserve. On September 3, 2015, he was waived by the Seahawks. On November 16, 2015, Cottom was re-signed to the practice squad.

On August 20, 2016, Cottom was waived by the Seahawks with an injury designation.

On May 5, 2017, Cottom re-signed with the Seahawks. On May 15, 2017, Cottom was waived by the Seahawks.

=== Outside the NFL ===
On September 14, 2018, Cottom signed with the Salt Lake Stallions of the Alliance of American Football.

On March 29, 2019, Cottom was assigned to the Philadelphia Soul of the Arena Football League.

== Survivor ==
Cottom was cast to compete on the 44th season of the American reality TV series Survivor. He started the game on the Ratu tribe and was ultimately the 7th person voted out and the ninth person eliminated, placing 10th overall.
