= Survivor 44 =

2023 series of US reality TV show

- Season 44
- Presented by: Jeff Probst
- No. of days: 26
- No. of castaways: 18
- Winner: Yamil "Yam Yam" Arocho
- Runner-up: Heidi Lagares-Greenblatt
- Location: Mamanuca Islands, Fiji
- No. of episodes: 13

Release
- Original network: CBS
- Original release: March 1 – May 24, 2023

Additional information
- Filming dates: June 5 – June 30, 2022

Season chronology
- ← Previous; Survivor 43 Next → Survivor 45

Survivor 44 is the forty-fourth season of the American competitive reality television series Survivor. This season, filmed from June 5 through June 30, 2022, is the twelfth consecutive season filmed in the Mamanuca Islands in Fiji. It premiered on March 1, 2023, on CBS in the United States and Global in Canada.

The season concluded on May 24, 2023, when Yamil "Yam Yam" Arocho was named the winner of the season, defeating Heidi Lagares-Greenblatt and Carolyn Wiger in a 7–1–0 vote.

== Format ==
Survivor is a reality television show based on the Swedish show Expedition Robinson, created by Mark Burnett and Charlie Parsons. The series follows a number of participants isolated in a remote location, where they must provide food, fire, and shelter. One by one, a participant is removed from the series by majority vote, with challenges held to give a reward (ranging from living- and food-related prizes to a car) and immunity from being voted out of the series. The last remaining player receives a prize of $1,000,000.

== Contestants ==
Cast of Survivor 44. Eventual winner Yam Yam Arocho among the right group (original Tika) at its second right.

The cast was announced on January 31, 2023, and consists of 18 new players divided into three tribes: Ratu, Soka, and Tika. The name of the merged tribe is Va Va, a name coined by contestant and eventual season winner Yamil "Yam Yam" Arocho from the Fijian term va, meaning "four" (Va Va being 4-4, as is Survivor 44). The cast included former Seattle Seahawks fullback Brandon Cottom.

List of Survivor 44 contestants
Contestant	Age	From	Tribe				Finish	
Contestant	Age	From	Original	Switched	None	Merged	Placement	Day
Bruce Perreault	46	Warwick, Rhode Island	Tika				Medically evacuated	Day 1
Maddy Pomilla	28	Brooklyn, New York	Ratu				1st voted out	Day 3
Helen Li	29	San Francisco, California	Tika				2nd voted out	Day 5
Claire Rafson	25	Brooklyn, New York	Soka				3rd voted out	Day 7
Sarah Wade	27	Chicago, Illinois	Tika	Tika			4th voted out	Day 9
Matthew Grinstead-Mayle	43	Columbus, Ohio	Ratu	Ratu			Quit (Injury)	Day 11
Josh Wilder	34	Atlanta, Georgia	Soka	Tika	None (Note: At the start of the individual phase of the game on Day 12, players had to earn their way into the merged tribe by either winning immunity or surviving the Day 13 Tribal Council.)		5th voted out	Day 13
Matt Blankinship	27	San Francisco, California	Soka	Soka	None	Va Va	6th voted out 1st jury member	Day 14
Brandon Cottom	30	Newtown, Pennsylvania	Ratu	Ratu	None	Va Va	7th voted out 2nd jury member	Day 15
Kane Fritzler	25	Saskatoon, Saskatchewan	Ratu	Ratu	None	Va Va	8th voted out 3rd jury member	Day 17
Frannie Marin	23	Cambridge, Massachusetts	Soka	Soka	None	Va Va	9th voted out 4th jury member	Day 19
Danny Massa	32	Bronx, New York	Soka	Soka	None	Va Va	10th voted out 5th jury member	Day 21
Jaime Lynn Ruiz	35	Mesa, Arizona	Ratu	Soka	None	Va Va	11th voted out 6th jury member	Day 23
Lauren Harpe	31	Mont Belvieu, Texas	Ratu	Ratu	None	Va Va	12th voted out 7th jury member	Day 24
Carson Garrett	20	Atlanta, Georgia	Tika	Ratu	None	Va Va	Eliminated; 8th jury member	Day 25
Carolyn Wiger	35	Hugo, Minnesota	Tika	Tika	None	Va Va	2nd runner-up	Day 26
Heidi Lagares-Greenblatt	43	Pittsburgh, Pennsylvania	Soka	Soka	None	Va Va	Runner-up	Day 26
Yamil "Yam Yam" Arocho	36	San Juan, Puerto Rico	Tika	Tika	None	Va Va	Sole Survivor	Day 26

=== Future appearances ===
Bruce Perreault returned for the following season, Survivor 45.

Outside of Survivor, Carolyn Wiger competed on the third season of The Traitors in 2025. In January 2026, Yamil "Yam Yam" Arocho competed in the fourth season of The Traitors, and later, in October of that same year, participated in Juego de Villanos, a Spanish-language adaptation of House of Villains.

Kane Fritzler competed on the fourth season of The Traitors Canada.

== Season summary ==
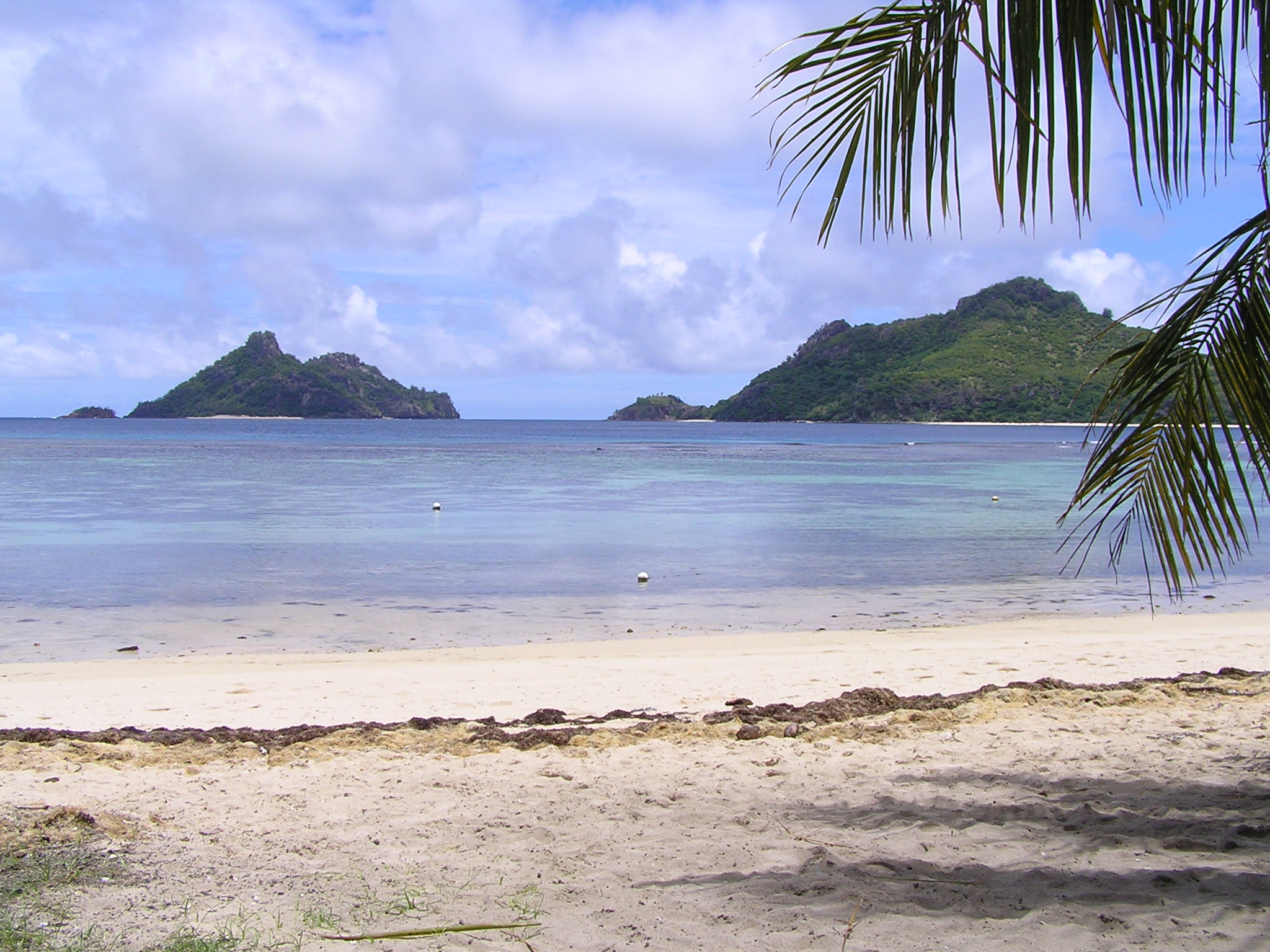
The season filmed in the Mamanuca Islands of Fiji.

Eighteen new castaways were divided into three tribes of six: Ratu, Soka, and Tika. Tika became the underdogs after losing most of the immunity challenges, but a core alliance of Carolyn, Carson, and Yam Yam outlasted their tribemates. Their position became powerful at the merge when the Ratu and Soka alliances went to war, as they navigated between the two sides to eliminate threats from each.

Former Soka Heidi, the last non-Tika left, won the final immunity challenge and chose to face Carson herself in the fire-making challenge. The gamble paid off as she joined Carolyn and Yam Yam in the final three with a record-breaking firemaking performance. However, it was not enough to win over the jury as Yam Yam's social game and taking strategic credit for Tika's decisions won him the title of Sole Survivor.

Survivor 44 season summary
Episode			Challenge winner(s)		Journey	Eliminated	
No.	Title	Air date	Reward	Immunity	Journey	Tribe	Player
1	"I Can't Wait to See Jeff"	March 1, 2023	Soka	None	None	Tika	Bruce
1	"I Can't Wait to See Jeff"	March 1, 2023	None	Soka	Lauren (Ratu)	Ratu	Maddy
1	"I Can't Wait to See Jeff"	March 1, 2023	None	Soka	Matt (Soka)	Ratu	Maddy
1	"I Can't Wait to See Jeff"	March 1, 2023	None	Tika	Sarah (Tika)	Ratu	Maddy
2	"Two Dorky Magnets"	March 8, 2023	Ratu		None	Tika	Helen
2	"Two Dorky Magnets"	March 8, 2023	Soka		None	Tika	Helen
3	"Sneaky Little Snake"	March 15, 2023	Ratu		None	Soka	Claire
3	"Sneaky Little Snake"	March 15, 2023	Tika		None	Soka	Claire
4	"I'm Felicia"	March 22, 2023	Soka	Soka	Carson (Tika)	Tika	Sarah
4	"I'm Felicia"	March 22, 2023	Soka	Soka	Jaime (Ratu)	Tika	Sarah
4	"I'm Felicia"	March 22, 2023	Ratu	Ratu	Josh (Soka)	Tika	Sarah
5	"The Third Turd"	March 29, 2023	None	Ratu	Brandon (Ratu)	Ratu	Matthew
5	"The Third Turd"	March 29, 2023	None	Ratu	Carolyn (Tika)	Ratu	Matthew
5	"The Third Turd"	March 29, 2023	None	Soka	Danny (Soka)	Ratu	Matthew
6	"Survivor with a Capital S"	April 5, 2023	Brandon, Carolyn, Carson, Frannie, Jaime, Matt		None	None	Josh
7	"Let's Not Be Cute About It"	April 12, 2023	Frannie [Carolyn, Carson, (Note: Carson did not participate in the challenge after picking the odd rock, but he correctly guessed the winning team and, as a result, also won immunity and reward.); Danny, Heidi, Kane]		None	Va Va	Matt
7	"Let's Not Be Cute About It"	April 12, 2023		Brandon	None	Va Va	Matt
8	"Don't Get Cocky, Kid"	April 19, 2023	None	Lauren	None	Va Va	Brandon
9	"Under the Wing of a Dragon"	April 26, 2023	None	Frannie	None	Va Va	Kane
10	"Full Tilt Boogie"	May 3, 2023	Frannie [Carolyn, Heidi, Lauren]	Carson	None	Va Va	Frannie
11	"I'm Not Worthy"	May 10, 2023	None	Yam Yam	None	Va Va	Danny
12	"I'm the Bandit"	May 17, 2023	Carson, Lauren, Yam Yam	Lauren	None	Va Va	Jaime
13	"Absolute Banger Season"	May 24, 2023	Carson [Yam Yam] (Note: In addition to immunity, Carson won reward for himself and one other castaway of his choice; he chose Yam Yam.)	Carson	None	Va Va	Lauren
13	"Absolute Banger Season"	May 24, 2023	None	~~Heidi~~ [Carolyn, Yam Yam] (Note: For winning the final Immunity Challenge, Heidi had to assign additional immunity to another player, with the remaining two competing in a fire-making challenge to determine the third finalist; Heidi chose to give up her immunity to save Carolyn and Yam Yam, and competed against Carson in the fire-making challenge.)	None	Va Va	Carson

== Episodes ==
No. overall	No. in season	Title	Rating/share (18–49)	Original release date	U.S. viewers (millions)
636	1	"I Can't Wait to See Jeff"	0.7/6	March 1, 2023	4.76
The 18 new castaways arrived in Fiji to begin Survivor 44.: Reward Challenge: Pairs of tribe members raced under obstacles in the sand to collect puzzle pieces, and then repeated until each player had gone once. Afterwards, two tribe members used those pieces to complete a block puzzle before trying to remove three large rings from a tall pole. The first tribe to finish won flint, while the second tribe to finish had their choice of either a "Savvy" or "Sweat" challenge to complete for their supplies, leaving the last tribe with whatever option was not chosen.; Soka won the challenge and Ratu finished second. The challenge was briefly stopped to tend to Bruce after he injured his head, but he was cleared to continue. However, he was pulled from the game later that night. At Ratu, the tribe elected to complete the "Sweat" challenge, with Brandon and Matthew dragging a net between two stations transporting coconuts. At Tika, Helen and Carson successfully completed the "Savvy" challenge. All three tribes also found a locked cage at their camp with a mystery advantage inside. The next day, boats arrived at each tribe's beach to take one member to a summit; Lauren, Matt, and Sarah were chosen. They were individually given a 1-in-3 chance at an advantage; guessing wrong meant losing their vote at the next Tribal Council, but they could elect to pick twice. Sarah lost one vote but received an "Inheritance" advantage to secretly inherit all advantages and idols played at one Tribal Council; Matt lost two consecutive votes; and Lauren received a "Bank Your Vote" advantage, giving her the option to give up her vote at one Tribal Council in exchange for an extra vote to be used in the future. During the summit, Ratu decided to search for the key to their cage; Brandon found it and elected to publicly open the cage and retrieve the advantage, which was a hidden immunity idol along with a fake one. Matthew also injured his shoulder while attempting to climb a jagged rock.: Immunity Challenge: Tribes paddled boats around distant buoys in the ocean before jumping into the water to retrieve a large chest on the sea floor. After hauling it ashore, tribe members pulled it across a ramp and then opened it for a key, which they used to unlock puzzle pieces and solve a giant sliding block puzzle. The first two tribes to finish won immunity, while the losing tribe had to forfeit their flint.; Soka and Tika won immunity. During the challenge, Brandon was temporarily pulled by the medical team due to heat exhaustion and Matthew learned from Claire that Lauren may have lied about what she got from the summit. Back at Ratu, Matthew shared this information with the tribe and many agreed to target Lauren; however, the women secretly wanted to blindside Brandon to flush his idol, bringing in Kane to help. At Tribal Council, Lauren elected to use her Bank Your Vote advantage, while Matthew and Jaime played their Shot in the Dark; Jaime's succeeded. Brandon played his idol, negating two votes against him, and his lone vote sent Maddy home.
637	2	"Two Dorky Magnets"	0.7/7	March 8, 2023	4.95
Brandon's trust in Kane diminished after finding out he was the other player that voted against him. At Soka, Matt felt drawn to Frannie, opening up the truth of how he lost his next two votes. Meanwhile, when everyone was not looking, Danny found the key to the tribe's caged idol. After grabbing the real idol, he placed the fake idol back in the bag, just before Claire and Matt went to investigate. At Tika, Carolyn likewise found the key to the cage but left the package open, resulting in everyone suspecting each other of opening it, not suspecting Carolyn whatsoever.: Immunity/Reward Challenge: Tribe members raced over a wooden obstacle before untying sandbags searching for a ball. Once found, one tribe member scaled up a tower to release rope, which remaining members pulled to raise a bridge so the member could cross and open it for the rest of the tribe. Afterwards, tribes raced to the finish, where one member used the ball to complete a vertical snake maze. The first two tribes won immunity along with large and small fishing gear rewards respectively, while the losing tribe had to forfeit their flint.; Ratu and Soka won the challenge. The alliance of Carson, Helen, and Sarah agreed to vote out Carolyn (though Sarah was without a vote), while Carolyn and Yam Yam tried to convince Carson to blindside Helen. At Tribal Council, Carolyn declined to play her idol and Carson flipped, sending Helen home.
638	3	"Sneaky Little Snake"	0.7/7	March 15, 2023	4.99
Carson admitted to Sarah that he flipped, but still wanted to work with her, though Sarah was skeptical. At Ratu, Jaime discovered an idol with Matthew, but Matthew revealed via a confessional that it was a fake and that he had found the real idol prior. At Soka, Matt and Frannie's connection continued, leading the other four to align against them. Matt found the key Danny hid and fell for the ruse after Danny had placed the parchment saying it was an idol back in the bag; Danny proceeded to tell the tribe that Matt found the idol.: Immunity/Reward Challenge: Tribe members swam out to a large wooden cube in the ocean, which they navigated through the water to two poles and collected keys off metal spirals. Ashore, tribes dug under a log and used one of the keys of unlock a rotating platform, where they solved a colored box puzzle so the boxes stacked without any repeating colors on any side. The first two tribes to finish won immunity, as well as large and small tool kits and fruit platters respectively, while the losing tribe had to forfeit their flint.; Claire volunteered to sit out a third consecutive challenge, and Ratu and Tika won. The tribe agreed to vote out Claire for her lack of contribution at camp and in challenges, but Frannie secretly considered a girls' alliance alongside Matt to blindside Josh, who had not approached many people strategically. At Tribal Council, Claire played her Shot in the Dark, which failed, and she was voted out unanimously (with Matt unable to vote).
639	4	"I'm Felicia"	0.7/7	March 22, 2023	5.19
Josh believed himself to be in the middle of two alliances (Danny & Heidi and Matt & Frannie), but the four of them planned to target him next. At Tika, the idol cage had a makeshift "X" mark in it, while another one was hidden, revealed to be Carolyn's work. Sarah ultimately found the fake idol after locating the other mark.: Reward Challenge: One tribe member at a time climbed a structure and hit a faraway target with sandbags using a slingshot. The first two tribes to hit all five targets won large and small tarps respectively, with the first placing tribe also getting to choosing which members from each tribes got to attend the summit.; Soka and Ratu won reward. Carson, Jaime, and Josh were sent to the summit. Each of them was given an idol that was good until all surviving castaways were living together on one beach, but all three also learned that they were forced to switch to a different tribe. Carson went to Ratu, Jaime to Soka, and Josh to Tika. At Ratu, Matthew told Carson that Jaime found an idol in front of him, leaving out that it was a fake. At Soka, Danny searched Jaime's bag to see if she had any advantages but came up empty. At Tika, Sarah figured Josh was a surgeon due to an earlier comment about needing to have steady hands, but Josh told his new tribemates that he was a personal trainer, which led to their distrust of him.: Immunity Challenge: One tribe member at a time traversed an obstacle course in the ocean, jumping to retrieve keys in the process. After retrieving all their keys, tribes unlocked pieces to a manta ray jigsaw puzzle. The first two tribes to solve their puzzle won immunity, while the losing tribe had to forfeit their flint.; Soka and Ratu won immunity. Yam Yam directed a plan to vote out Josh with Carolyn as the decoy vote, but that did not sit well with Carolyn, so she and Josh contemplated making a move against Sarah using Josh's idol that he told Carolyn about. At Tribal Council, Josh played the idol on himself to negate two votes, and Carolyn joined him in blindsiding Sarah, leaving Yam Yam shocked.
640	5	"The Third Turd"	0.8/7	March 29, 2023	5.25
Yam Yam and Josh were in conflict over the vote, but bonded later due to their respective coming out stories. Josh also told Yam Yam he had another idol (really a fake) and showed him the note from his journey. At Ratu, Matthew's shoulder injury was not improving, while Carson and Kane bonded. At Soka, Jaime tried to align with Frannie.: Immunity Challenge: Three tribe members were tethered together with ropes and navigated across several wooden obstacles, before filling a pot with water, crossing a seesaw and emptying it into a bucket, then running back and crossing again until they had emptied enough to drop a barrier. Once through, two tribe members navigated three balls through a table maze, attempting to lad them all in different holes. The first two tribes to finish won immunity, with the first placing tribe getting to choose which member from each tribe went on a journey, and the last place tribe having to forfeit their flint.; Ratu and Soka won the challenge, with Jeff asking Matthew to stay behind so medical could examine his shoulder. Brandon, Danny, and Carolyn were chosen for the journey, and they got to enjoy a small food reward. Brandon and Danny bonded, making Carolyn feel excluded. She immediately mouthed to Yam Yam that she was on board with him against Josh (due to Brandon and Danny wanting to include Josh in their newly formed "strong guys" alliance) and told him the note Josh had was the same one he showed her before the previous Tribal Council. Yam Yam was torn on who to side with, but Jeff arrived at Tika shortly before Tribal Council saying Matthew had decided to leave the game due to his injury. Thus, Tribal Council was cancelled for that night.
641	6	"Survivor with a Capital S"	0.7/7	April 5, 2023	5.19
All three tribes received treemail to convene at Ratu's beach, ending the tribal stage of the game and rendering Carson and Jaime's summit idols useless. Josh's claim that he had an idol circulated around the tribe, with some questioning the validity of his claim.: Immunity Challenge: Divided into two teams of six by random draw, team members raced to unearth a large boulder before navigating it through a series of obstacles, standing on it when necessary to grab a key, which they used after they scaled to a top of a tower to unlock puzzle pieces and assemble a tree puzzle. The first team to complete the puzzle won immunity at the next Tribal Council, the new merged tribe buffs and a merge feast reward.; Brandon, Carolyn, Carson, Frannie, Jaime, and Matt won the challenge. Carolyn's attempt to convince her teammates that Josh's idol was fake fell on deaf ears, and a plan to vote out Josh with Kane as a backup was formed. Carson told Kane that his name came up, raising red flags with his allies, while Josh tried to recruit allies to vote out Yam Yam. At Tribal Council, most of the tribe voted out Josh, and the remaining 11 were officially merged.
642	7	"Let's Not Be Cute About It"	0.7/7	April 12, 2023	5.34
At the merged tribe, Va Va (a name coined by Yam Yam for the Fijian meaning of '44'), Brandon revealed to Matt that the birdcage had a real and a fake idol, leading Matt to deduce the one he had was fake and that Danny had set him up at Soka.: Immunity Challenge: Divided into two teams of five by random draw (with one odd castaway getting to pick their team), castaways stood on a narrow platforms while balancing a ball at the end of a long pole. At regular intervals, they would move onto narrower parts of the beam, making it harder to balance. If castaway dropped their ball or stepped off the platform, they would be eliminated from the challenge. The longest-lasting castaway from each team won immunity, with the longest-surviving castaway overall winning a peanut butter and jelly sandwich reward for their team, as well as group immunity, letting that group spectate the upcoming Tribal Council while not voting.; Frannie outlasted Brandon to win immunity for herself, Carolyn, Danny, Heidi, and Kane; Carson also won due to correctly predicting the winning team after drawing the odd rock. Brandon also won immunity as the last one standing from his team. The losing team was exiled to Soka's beach, where Matt felt vulnerable due to leaving his bag at the merged camp. The Ratu majority of Brandon, Jaime, and Lauren were in control, leaving Yam Yam and Matt to plead their cases. The winning team received a note saying a new advantage was hidden in a birdcage with several keys scattered around the jungle; Heidi found the correct key leading her to a "Control a Vote" advantage; she would pick someone at the upcoming Tribal Council and direct them to cast a vote for whoever she wanted. At Tribal Council, Heidi used her advantage to have Lauren vote against Yam Yam; upon Lauren asking, Jeff confirmed that Lauren's extra vote would be her own to cast if she chose to play it. However, she chose to hold onto her advantage, and Brandon and Jaime sided with Yam Yam to send Matt to the jury.
643	8	"Don't Get Cocky, Kid"	0.8/7	April 19, 2023	5.29
Frannie was left devastated after Matt's elimination. Carson woke up feeling ill the next morning while Danny sought to break up the Ratu alliance by targeting Lauren and flushing her extra vote. Treemail on Day 15 instructed the castaways to divide into pairs for the next immunity challenge.: Immunity Challenge: The five pairs would maneuver themselves through a tangled net one-at-a-time, then dig up three planks from a sand pit. The first four pairs to do this used those planks to cross a rope bridge. The first two pairs to make it across made it to the final round, where they would compete as individuals. The final four stood on narrow footholds, and at regular intervals, the footholds would get narrower. The last person left standing won immunity.; Lauren won immunity, outlasting Danny and thwarting his plan. The vote came down to Ratu vs. Soka, with Tika in the middle; Ratu targeted Frannie while Soka targeted Brandon. Danny told his allies about his idol and planned to play it for Frannie, but Heidi leaked this to Carson and Yam Yam, causing chaos for the Soka alliance. At Tribal Council, Carson and Yam Yam voted for Frannie, but Carolyn deviated to join Soka; Danny played his idol on Frannie to negate six votes, and a blindsided Brandon was sent to the jury.
644	9	"Under the Wing of a Dragon"	0.7/7	April 26, 2023	5.22
Kane and Danny began searching for a new idol; the rest of the tribe soon joined them, and it was found by Heidi. Treemail alluded to a negotiation for rice, and though Danny tried to convince everyone to compete, Carson had other ideas.: Immunity Challenge: Castaways stood with one leg on a narrow perch, bracing a ball with a handle against a narrow piece of wood. If a castaway stepped down or dropped their ball, they'd be eliminated from the challenge. The last standing player won immunity. At the challenge, Jeff offered a large bag of rice to the tribe if four players would sit out, sacrificing their own chance at immunity.; Carson, Lauren, Kane, and Heidi sat out, giving the tribe the rice. Frannie outlasted Danny for immunity. The Ratu alliance planned on bringing in Tika to split the vote between Danny and Heidi, then passed their advantages along in case of a potential Knowledge is Power being played. Lauren gave her extra vote to Jaime so that she could cast twice against Heidi, while Jaime gave her fake idol to Kane, still believing it to be real. Frannie tried to convince Danny to align with Ratu to blindside one of the Tika trio, which Danny was not receptive to. At Tribal Council, last minute strategic confirmations initiated a live tribal. Jaime used the extra vote, but it was for naught as Soka and Tika joined forces to send Kane to the jury with Jaime's fake idol in his pocket.
645	10	"Full Tilt Boogie"	0.7/6	May 3, 2023	4.96
Frannie and Jaime were frustrated about being left out of the Kane vote. Carson lied to Jaime that Kane told others about her idol.: Reward Challenge: Castaways spun on a metal frame to drag a buoy past a marker, before crossing a balance beam while dizzy, attempting to untie and collected two balls. Once through, players raced to the finish, where they attempted to land both balls on top of a raised trough. The first castaway to finish won a trip to the sanctuary, which included a Mexican themed meal, a night's stay with amenities as well as letters from home.; Frannie won reward and selected Carolyn, Lauren, and Heidi to join her. They enjoyed their food and letters from home while discussing a possible Danny blindside. Back at camp, Jaime told the others that her "idol" went home with Kane, but they did not believe her.: Immunity Challenge: Castaways, with their arms bound and feet tethered together wriggled over mounds of sand while using their mouth to bite a ring and drag a buoy along the way. Once they had reached their mats, they unbound their hands and maneuvered the buoy through a rope course to the finish, where they untied puzzle pieces and completed a star puzzle. The first castaway to finish their puzzle won immunity.; Carson won immunity. Danny proposed that they target Frannie due to her strength in challenges, and a plan was formed to split the vote with Jaime to flush her idol. Yam Yam and Carson schemed to target Frannie without telling Carolyn the plan, fearing that they had grown too close. Carolyn suggested flipping the vote onto Heidi, but at Tribal Council, Frannie was sent to the jury, leaving Carolyn and Heidi in the dark.
646	11	"I'm Not Worthy"	0.7/6	May 10, 2023	4.78
Carolyn was upset with Carson and Yam Yam over leaving her out of the Frannie vote but made up with them the next morning. Danny started making moves to eliminate one of the Tika trio with Yam Yam as his first target.: Immunity Challenge: Castaways hung underneath a grated steel barricade in the ocean as the tide rose. As the challenge wore on, it would give them less room to breathe, making it more difficult. If a player surfaced from the grate, they would be eliminated from the challenge. The last castaway remaining won immunity.; Yam Yam won immunity, forcing Danny to target Carson instead. Carolyn felt uneasy that her ally might go home, so she told Carson about her idol and mulled playing it for him to eliminate Danny. At Tribal Council, Carolyn got into a minor argument with Danny and Lauren over gameplay. She then played her idol for Carson to negate two votes against him, and though the remaining Ratus voted against Heidi in case of an idol, the Tika trio sent Danny to the jury (with Carolyn's vote crossing out Lauren's name).
647	12	"I’m the Bandit"	0.7/7	May 17, 2023	4.71
Carolyn confessed to finding the Tika idol on the second day and covering her tracks, causing the other players to realize that she was a stronger player than they thought. The next morning, Jaime woke up early to look for an idol; Carson saw her and recruited Carolyn to look for it as well. Heidi also joined in the search, despite already having an idol of her own.: Reward Challenge: In teams of three, two blindfolded players maneuvered a third teammate suspended within a giant ball through an obstacle course. That player then directed their blindfolded teammates to solve a table maze. First trio to finish the maze won a trip to the Survivor Sanctuary for food and other luxuries.; Carson, Lauren, and Yam Yam won reward. At the Sanctuary, Carson and Yam Yam promised Lauren that they were willing to vote out Carolyn, and Yam Yam privately considered it. Back at camp, Jaime attempted to convince Carolyn to flip on her Tika allies, but Carolyn told Carson about this immediately when he returned, swearing her loyalty.: Immunity Challenge: Players balanced a ball on a small platform by holding ropes to steady it. At intervals, players had to step further back, making it more difficult to balance the platform. Last player with their ball standing won immunity.; Lauren won immunity. Carolyn attempted to convince Heidi to vote for Jaime, which Heidi considered in order to save her idol and secure her safety. However, Carson and Yam Yam considered flipping on Carolyn, believing she was a bigger jury threat despite being a valuable ally. At Tribal Council, Heidi played her idol, despite receiving zero votes. Carolyn received two votes, surprising her, but the Tika alliance held strong and Jaime was sent home. Jeff then informed the final five that they would be traveling to a new beach to start over from scratch, but anticipating this, the players had brought all their supplies from camp.
648	13	"Absolute Banger Season"	0.7/7	May 24, 2023	4.41
The final five players arrived at their new island and celebrated making the finale. All five searched for an idol or an advantage through the night and morning, but found nothing. Lauren and Heidi believed Carson was the biggest threat remaining and attempted to convince Yam Yam and Carolyn to vote him out.: Immunity Challenge: Players raced through an obstacle course collecting keys, which they used to unlock a chest to lower a ladder, then climbed the ladder to solve a block puzzle. First person to solve the puzzle won immunity and a trip to the Survivor Sanctuary for a food reward.; Carson won immunity, and elected to take Yam Yam with him to the Sanctuary. They discussed whether to target Lauren or Carolyn, while back at camp, the girls contemplated whether to target Yam Yam. Upon returning to camp, Yam Yam sensed tension from the others and realized he was in danger. However, at Tribal Council, Carolyn remained Tika loyal, and Lauren was voted out.: Immunity Challenge: With one hand tied behind their backs, players dropped a ball into a spinning track with a turnstile at the middle, depositing the ball at alternate exits. Players must then catch the ball and return it into the track, adding additional balls at intervals. Last player not to drop any of their balls won immunity.; Heidi outlasted Carson to win immunity. She was unsure of what she was going to do that night, and all players practiced firemaking that afternoon, with Carson struggling the most. At Tribal Council, Heidi chose to send herself to firemaking against Carson.: Fire Making Challenge: Heidi and Carson faced off and Heidi was very quick to start and build her fire while Carson struggled to get his to ignite. Carson finally was able to get a good fire going but was too late. Heidi set a record for building the fastest fire in Survivor fire challenges thus sending Carson to the jury.; The final three enjoyed a breakfast feast the final morning ahead of their Final Tribal Council. The jury grilled players on their social, strategic, and physical games. Heidi highlighted her risk-taking late in the game and how she used other players as shields to stay safe. Carolyn discussed her physical and mental struggles on the island, using her emotions as a strength rather than a weakness. Yam Yam took strategic credit for voting out people who voted for him and highlighted his social game, making bonds with each member of the jury. The jury voted 7-1-0 in favor of Yam Yam over Heidi and Carolyn, respectively, awarding him the million dollars and the title of Sole Survivor. After the votes were read, Jeff and the players discussed the game while enjoying pizza and champagne in a special after-show segment.

== Voting history ==
Survivor 44 voting history
	Original tribes				Switched tribes		No tribes	Merged tribe								
Episode	1		2	3	4	5	6	7	8	9		10	11	12	13	
Day	1	3	5	7	9	11	13	14	15	17		19	21	23	24	25
Tribe	Tika	Ratu	Tika	Soka	Tika	Ratu	None	Va Va	Va Va	Va Va		Va Va	Va Va	Va Va	Va Va	Va Va
Eliminated	Bruce	Maddy	Helen	Claire	Sarah	Matthew	Josh	Matt	Brandon	Kane		Frannie	Danny	Jaime	Lauren	Carson
Votes	Evacuated (Note: No vote; Bruce was medically evacuated from the game.)	1–0 (Note: Brandon played a hidden immunity idol on himself; therefore two votes against him were not counted.)	3–1	4–0	2–0 (Note: Josh played a hidden immunity idol on himself; therefore two votes against him were not counted.)	Quit (Note: No vote; Matthew chose to leave the game due to an injury.)	7–3–1	3–2	4–0 (Note: Danny played a hidden immunity idol on Frannie; therefore six votes against her were not counted.)	5–3–1–1		5–2–1	3–2–0 (Note: Carolyn played a hidden immunity idol on Carson; therefore two votes against him were not counted.)	4–2	3–1–1	None (Note: For winning the final immunity challenge, Heidi had to assign additional immunity to another player, with the remaining two competing in a fire-making challenge to determine the third finalist; Heidi chose to give up her immunity (without bequeathing her necklace) to save Carolyn and Yam-Yam, and subsequently defeated Carson in the fire-making challenge.)
Voter	Vote															Challenge
Yam Yam			Helen		~~Josh~~		Josh	Matt	~~Frannie~~	Kane		Frannie	Danny	Jaime	Heidi	Saved
Heidi				Claire			Josh	Immune (Note: The players who won immunity on Day 14 were not eligible to vote at that night's Tribal Council.)	Brandon	Kane		Danny	~~Carson~~	Jaime	Lauren	Won
Carolyn			Helen		Sarah		Kane	Immune	Brandon	Kane		Heidi	Danny	Jaime	Lauren	Saved
Carson			Helen				Josh	Immune	~~Frannie~~	Kane		Frannie	Danny	Jaime	Lauren	Lost
Lauren		None (Note: This player played a Bank Your Vote advantage, and as a result, deferred that night's vote to another Tribal Council.)					Josh	Yam Yam (Note: Heidi played the Control a Vote advantage, which allowed her to select one of the five players voting at Tribal Council and force them to vote for whomever she wanted. Heidi chose to control Lauren's vote, and instructed her to vote for Yam Yam.)	~~Frannie~~	Heidi		Frannie	Heidi	Carolyn	Yam Yam	
Jaime		None (Note: This player played the Shot in the Dark, and as a result, had to sacrifice that night's vote.)					Josh	Matt	~~Frannie~~	Heidi	Heidi (Note: This player played an extra vote advantage, allowing them to cast two ballots during a single vote.)	Frannie	Heidi	Carolyn		
Danny				Claire			Josh	Immune	Brandon	Kane		Frannie	~~Carson~~			
Frannie				Claire			Josh	Immune	Brandon	Jaime		Heidi				
Kane		~~Brandon~~					Yam Yam	Immune	~~Frannie~~	Danny						
Brandon		Maddy					Yam Yam	Matt	~~Frannie~~							
Matt				None (Note: This player lost a vote attempting to gain an advantage.)			None	Yam Yam								
Josh				Claire	Sarah		Yam Yam									
Matthew		None				Quit										
Sarah			None		~~Josh~~											
Claire				None												
Helen			Carolyn													
Maddy		~~Brandon~~														
Bruce	Evacuated															

Jury vote
Episode	13		
Day	26		
Finalist	Yam Yam	Heidi	Carolyn
Votes	7–1–0		
Juror	Vote		
Carson	Yes		
Lauren	Yes		
Jaime	Yes		
Danny		Yes	
Frannie	Yes		
Kane	Yes		
Brandon	Yes		
Matt	Yes		

== Production ==
CBS renewed Survivor for its forty-third and forty-fourth seasons on March 9, 2022. As with every season since season 41, Survivor 44 features 26 days of gameplay, pitting eighteen contestants against one another in three initial tribes. Filming began on June 5, 2022, and concluded on June 30, 2022.

== Reception ==
Survivor 44 received positive reviews; praise was directed toward the cast, their camaraderie and the level of strategic play, while some criticism was directed toward the abundance of twists and advantages in the pre-merge portion of the season as well as the predictability of the post-merge portion. Entertainment Weekly's Dalton Ross ranked this season 20th out of 44, praising the cast, particularly Carolyn and Yam Yam for being "an all-time great character" and "one of the most delightfully funny narrators in the show's history" respectively, but criticized the season for lacking "jaw-dropping moves or moments along the way that stood out." The "Purple Rock Podcast" ranked this season 11th out of 44, stating that the season's cast "came to play" and that the season has "a little something for many different types of Survivor fans: strategy, comedy, romance, and satisfying narrative arcs." Although Andy Dehnart of Reality Blurred criticized the season for having "some lamentable decisions and frustrating episodes", he praised the cast and their gameplay, which he states is "the best we can ask for in this new era." Martin Holmes of Inside Survivor had mixed feelings towards the season. Although he praised the Tika three and their arc throughout the season, he also criticized that said alliance's overexposure "resulted in gaps in the narrative and took away the emotional impact and investment when it came to those players' eliminations." He also viewed the finale as predictable, stating that it went "pretty much as expected, with very little in the way of surprises." In 2024, Nick Caruso of TVLine ranked this season 20th out of 47.
