= Newtown, Pennsylvania =

Newtown is the name of some places in the U.S. state of Pennsylvania:

- Newtown, Bucks County, Pennsylvania
- Newtown, Schuylkill County, Pennsylvania
- Newtown Township, Bucks County, Pennsylvania
- Newtown Township, Delaware County, Pennsylvania

== See also ==
- Newton Township, Lackawanna County, Pennsylvania
- North Newton Township, Pennsylvania
- South Newton Township, Pennsylvania
