= Island of Love (band) =

English rock band

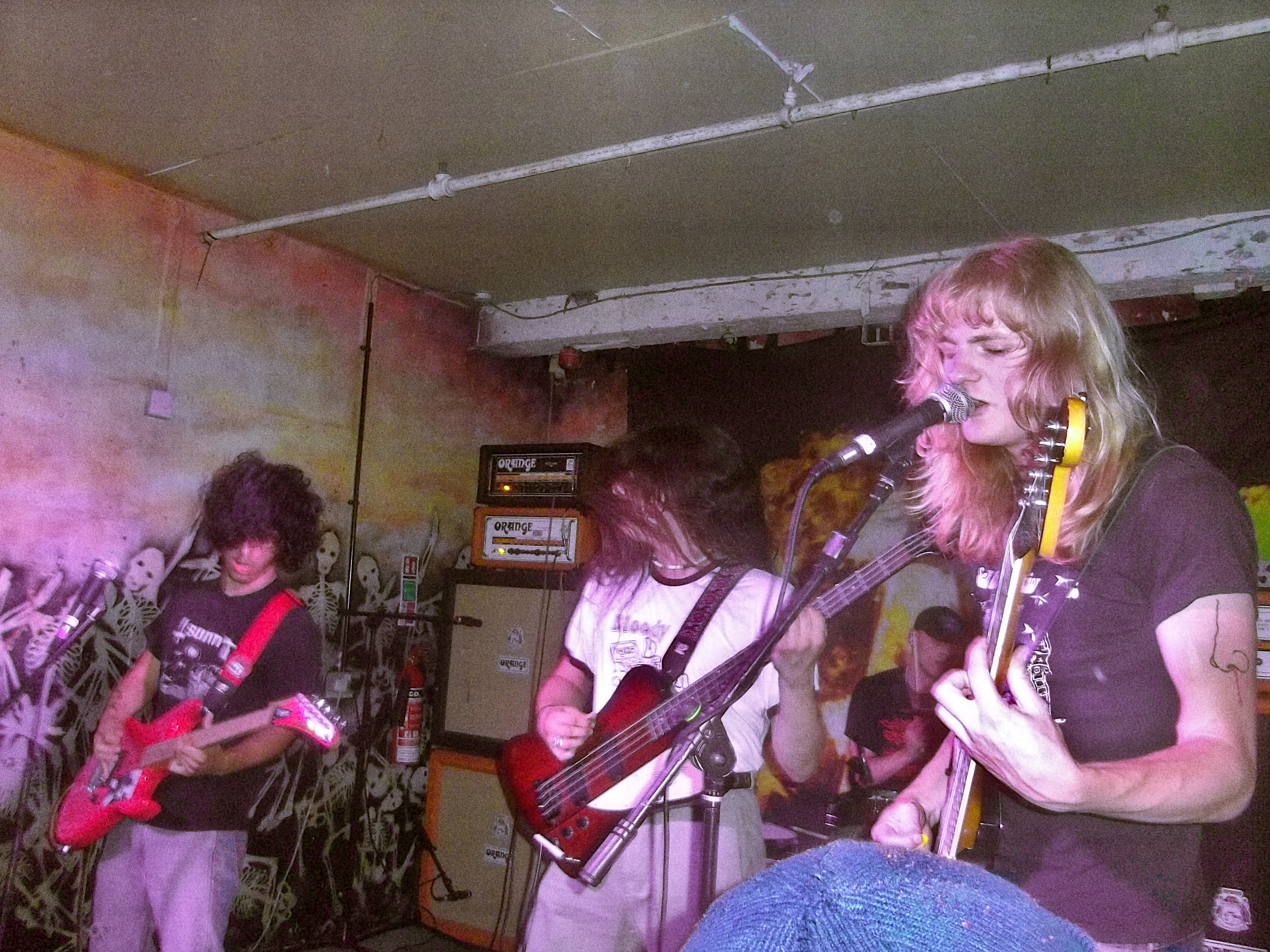
- Island of Love performing in 2023

Background information
- Also known as: Love Island
- Origin: London, U.K.
- Genres: Alternative rock; indie rock; garage rock; indie pop
- Years active: 2019–2023
- Label: Third Man
- Past members: Karim Newble; Linus Munch; Daniel Alvarez-Giraldo; Jimmy Guvercin

Island of Love was an English rock band formed in London in 2019. The first UK signing to United States record label Third Man Records, the band released two EPs alongside their 2023 debut album Island of Love.

== History ==
Island of Love was formed by members of multiple hardcore punk bands. Karim Newble, Daniel Alvarez-Giraldo and Linus Munch were all members of Sterile, amongst other groups, and Jimmy Guvercin was a member of Urine Charge. The members met at East London recording studio Fuzzbrain studios in 2019 through these previous bands and soon began discussing the formation of a band together. Named for the ITV dating show Love Island, they began writing music at Newble and Munch's parents houses, with the first written being "Low", while at Newble's mum's house. Following the September 2020 fire which burned down Fuzzbrain, both Newble and Linus began writing and recording demos separately with Fuzzbrain's Ben Spence at his parents' house. This culminated in the band's debut release, March 2020's Promo Tape EP, which was released physically by Smoking Room Records. In September 2021, they performed at London's the Blue Basement venue owned by Third Man Records, following which, the record label's co-owner Ben Swank approached the band with the offer of signing them. On 9 February 2022, they released the single "Songs of Love". The release was coincided with the announcement that the band were the first signing to the London imprint of Third Man Records, and that the label would be releasing their debut EP Songs of Love on 18 March. On 17 February 2023, they released their double single "Grow / Blues 2000" and announced that their debut album Island of Love would be released on 12 May. On 14 March, they released the EP's second single "At Home". In June, they performed at Bigfoot Festival 2022, and opened for Jack White, at the Hammersmith Apollo. On 17 March, the album's third single "Fed Rock" was released, followed on 23 April, by the release of "I’ve Got the Secret". On 11 October, the band announced on their Instagram page that the band had disbanded.

== Musical style ==
Critics have categorised the band as alternative rock, indie rock, garage rock and indie pop, often making use of elements of pop, grunge, jangle pop, college rock, power pop, garage punk, shoegaze, punk rock, noise rock and post-punk. Their music often makes use of fuzz in both guitar tones and vocals. They also use lo-fi production techniques. DIY writer Bella Martin likened their sound to "90s slacker rock with a DIY punk aesthetic, or the Cribs at their least immediate via the kind of tempered sonic layering that circa-2010 breakthroughs Japandroids and Cloud Nothings were fond of". NME writer Becky Rogers cited them as merging influences from Black Sabbath, the Beach Boys and the garage rock revival. Brighton and Hove News writer Nick Linazasoro described them their music as "loud, ragged and raw punk, but with a melodic west coast indie Barracudas grunge edge".

They have cited influenced including Dinosaur Jr., Hüsker Dü, Built to Spill, Rick Maguire of Pile, John Fahey, Michael Hurley, the Cribs, the Maccabees, Steve Hartlett of Ovlov, Neil Young, Duster, Sebadoh, Black Sabbath, Thin Lizzy, the Rolling Stones, the Ramones, Natasha Bedingfield, the Strokes and Girls.

== Members ==
Final

- Karim Newble – guitar, vocals (2019–present)
- Linus Munch – guitar, vocals (2019–present)
- Daniel Alvarez-Giraldo – bass (2019–present)

Former

- Jimmy Guvercin – drums (2019–2022)

== Discography ==
Albums

- Island of Love (2023)

EPs

- Promo Tape (2020)
- Songs of Love (2022)
