= South Newton Township, Pennsylvania =

Township in Pennsylvania, US

Coordinates: 40°05′00″N 77°24′59″W

- Township
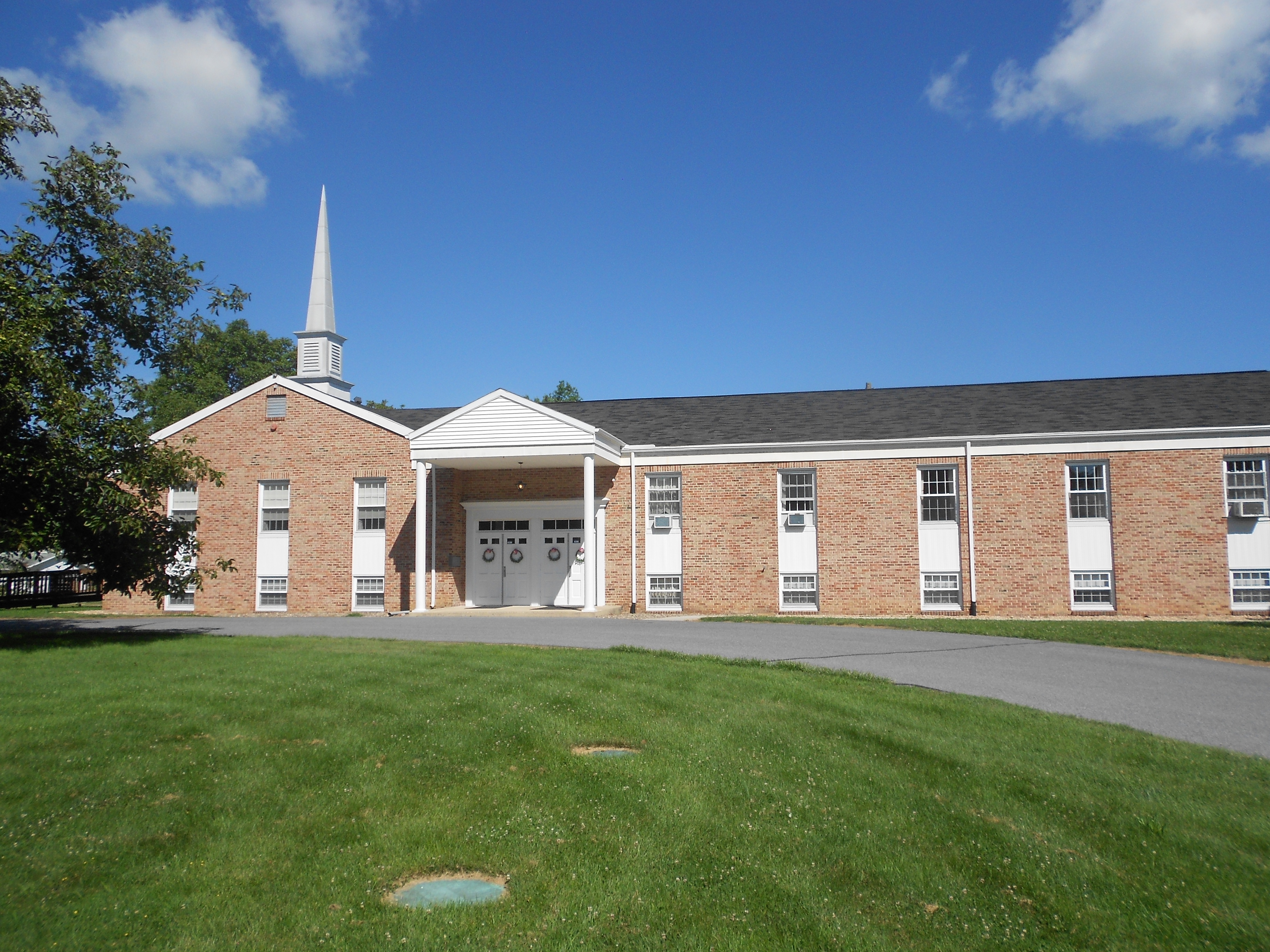
- Trinity United Methodist in Walnut Bottom

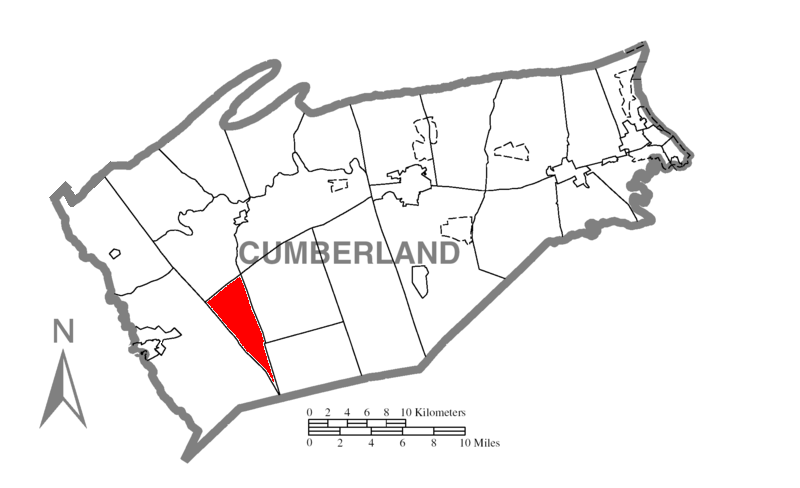
- Map of Cumberland County, Pennsylvania highlighting South Newton Township

- Map of Cumberland County, Pennsylvania
- Country: United States
- State: Pennsylvania
- County: Cumberland

Government
  - Type: Board of Supervisors

Area
  - Total: 11.39 sq mi (29.50 km^{2})
  - Land: 11.32 sq mi (29.32 km^{2})
  - Water: 0.069 sq mi (0.18 km^{2})

Population (2010)
  - Total: 1,383
  - Estimate (2016): 1,441
  - Density: 127.3/sq mi (49.15/km^{2})
- Time zone: UTC-5 (Eastern (EST))
  - Summer (DST): UTC-4 (EDT)
- Area code: 717
- FIPS code: 42-041-72384
- Website: southnewtontownship.net

Historical population
Census	Pop.	Note	%±
2000	1,290		—
2010	1,383		7.2%
2016 (est.)	1,441		4.2%
U.S. Decennial Census

South Newton Township is a township in Cumberland County, Pennsylvania, United States. The population was 1,383 at the 2010 census.

== Geography ==
The township is in southwestern Cumberland County, extending from the Cumberland Valley in the north to South Mountain in the south. It includes the unincorporated community of Walnut Bottom along Yellow Breeches Creek in the north.

According to the United States Census Bureau, the township has a total area of 11.4 square miles (29.5 km^{2}), of which 11.3 square miles (29.3 km^{2}) is land and 0.08 square miles (0.2 km^{2}), or 0.62%, is water.

== Demographics ==
As of the census of 2000, there were 1,290 people, 455 households, and 359 families residing in the township. The population density was 116.3 inhabitants per square mile (44.9/km^{2}). There were 480 housing units at an average density of 43.3 per square mile (16.7/km^{2}). The racial makeup of the township was 99.07% White, 0.23% African American, 0.16% Native American, 0.31% Asian, 0.08% from other races, and 0.16% from two or more races. Hispanic or Latino of any race were 0.47% of the population.

There were 455 households, out of which 35.6% had children under the age of 18 living with them, 68.8% were married couples living together, 6.2% had a female householder with no husband present, and 20.9% were non-families. 17.8% of all households were made up of individuals, and 8.6% had someone living alone who was 65 years of age or older. The average household size was 2.84 and the average family size was 3.25.

In the township the population was spread out, with 29.1% under the age of 18, 8.6% from 18 to 24, 27.2% from 25 to 44, 23.3% from 45 to 64, and 11.8% who were 65 years of age or older. The median age was 36 years. For every 100 females, there were 99.1 males. For every 100 females age 18 and over, there were 94.3 males.

The median income for a household in the township was $45,952, and the median income for a family was $53,750. Males had a median income of $35,313 versus $24,076 for females. The per capita income for the township was $17,782. About 4.7% of families and 7.9% of the population were below the poverty line, including 10.8% of those under age 18 and 5.2% of those age 65 or over.
