= Survivor 45 =

- Season 45
- Presented by: Jeff Probst
- No. of days: 26
- No. of castaways: 18
- Winner: Dee Valladares
- Runner-up: Austin Li Coon
- Location: Mamanuca Islands, Fiji
- No. of episodes: 13

Release
- Original network: CBS
- Original release: September 27 – December 20, 2023

Additional information
- Filming dates: April 17 – May 12, 2023

Season chronology
- ← Previous; Survivor 44 Next → Survivor 46

Survivor 45 is the forty-fifth season of the American competitive reality television series Survivor. It was the thirteenth consecutive season to be filmed in the Mamanuca Islands in Fiji, and premiered on September 27, 2023, on CBS in the United States.

The season ended on December 20, 2023, when Dee Valladares was voted the Sole Survivor, defeating Austin Li Coon and Jake O'Kane in a 5–3–0 vote. Valladares—who is Cuban-American—became the fourth Hispanic castaway to win, following two-time winner Sandra Diaz-Twine from both Survivor: Pearl Islands and Survivor: Heroes vs. Villains, and Yamil "Yam-Yam" Arocho from Survivor 44.

== Format ==
Survivor is a reality television show based on the Swedish show Expedition Robinson, created by Mark Burnett and Charlie Parsons. The series follows a number of participants isolated in a remote location, where they must provide food, fire, and shelter. One by one, a participant is removed from the series by majority vote, with challenges held to give a reward (ranging from living- and food-related prizes to a car) and immunity from being voted out of the series. The last remaining player receives a prize of $1,000,000.

== Contestants ==
Cast of Survivor 45. Eventual winner Dee Valladares among the left group (original Reba) at the right of the group's front row.

The cast of 18 contestants was announced on September 6, 2023. Notable cast members include singer-songwriter J. Maya and Bruce Perreault; the latter had briefly competed on the previous season but was medically evacuated after sustaining an injury in the first episode.

List of Survivor 45 contestants
Contestant	Age	From	Tribe				Finish	
Contestant	Age	From	Original	Switched	None	Merged	Placement	Day
Hannah Rose	33	Baltimore, Maryland	Lulu				Quit	Day 3
Brandon Donlon	26	Sicklerville, New Jersey	Lulu				1st voted out	Day 5
Sabiyah Broderick	28	Jacksonville, North Carolina	Lulu				2nd voted out	Day 7
Sean Edwards	35	Provo, Utah	Lulu	Reba			3rd voted out	Day 9
Brandon "Brando" Meyer	23	Seattle, Washington	Belo	Belo			4th voted out	Day 11
Janani "J. Maya" Krishnan-Jha	24	Los Angeles, California	Reba	Reba	None (Note: At the start of the individual phase of the game on Day 12, players had to earn their way into the merged tribe by either winning immunity or surviving the Day 13 Tribal Council.)		5th voted out	Day 13
Nicholas "Sifu" Alsup	30	O'Fallon, Illinois	Reba	Reba	None	Dakuwaqa	6th voted out	Day 14
Kaleb Gebrewold	29	Vancouver, British Columbia	Lulu	Lulu	None	Dakuwaqa	7th voted out 1st jury member	Day 14
Kellie Nalbandian	29	New York City, New York	Belo	Lulu	None	Dakuwaqa	8th voted out 2nd jury member	Day 16
Kendra McQuarrie	30	Steamboat Springs, Colorado	Belo	Belo	None	Dakuwaqa	9th voted out 3rd jury member	Day 17
Bruce Perreault Survivor 44	47	Warwick, Rhode Island	Belo	Lulu	None	Dakuwaqa	10th voted out 4th jury member	Day 19
Emily Flippen	28	Laurel, Maryland	Lulu	Belo	None	Dakuwaqa	11th voted out 5th jury member	Day 21
Drew Basile	23	Philadelphia, Pennsylvania	Reba	Belo	None	Dakuwaqa	12th voted out 6th jury member	Day 23
Julie Alley	49	Brentwood, Tennessee	Reba	Reba	None	Dakuwaqa	13th voted out 7th jury member	Day 24
Katurah Topps	35	Brooklyn, New York	Belo	Lulu	None	Dakuwaqa	Eliminated; 8th jury member	Day 25
Jake O'Kane	26	Boston, Massachusetts	Belo	Lulu	None	Dakuwaqa	2nd runner-up	Day 26
Austin Li Coon	26	Chicago, Illinois	Reba	Belo	None	Dakuwaqa	Runner-up	Day 26
Dee Valladares	26	Miami, Florida	Reba	Reba	None	Dakuwaqa	Sole Survivor	Day 26

=== Future appearances ===
Dee Valladares and Emily Flippen returned to compete on Survivor 50: In the Hands of the Fans.

Outside of Survivor, Drew Basile competed on Jeopardy! in 2024 and qualified for the season 41 Tournament of Champions. Sifu Alsup competed on Beast Games. Valladares competed on The Challenge: Vets & New Threats (2025) and then season 28 (2026) of Big Brother. Kellie Nalbandian competed on the second season of 99 to Beat.

== Season summary ==
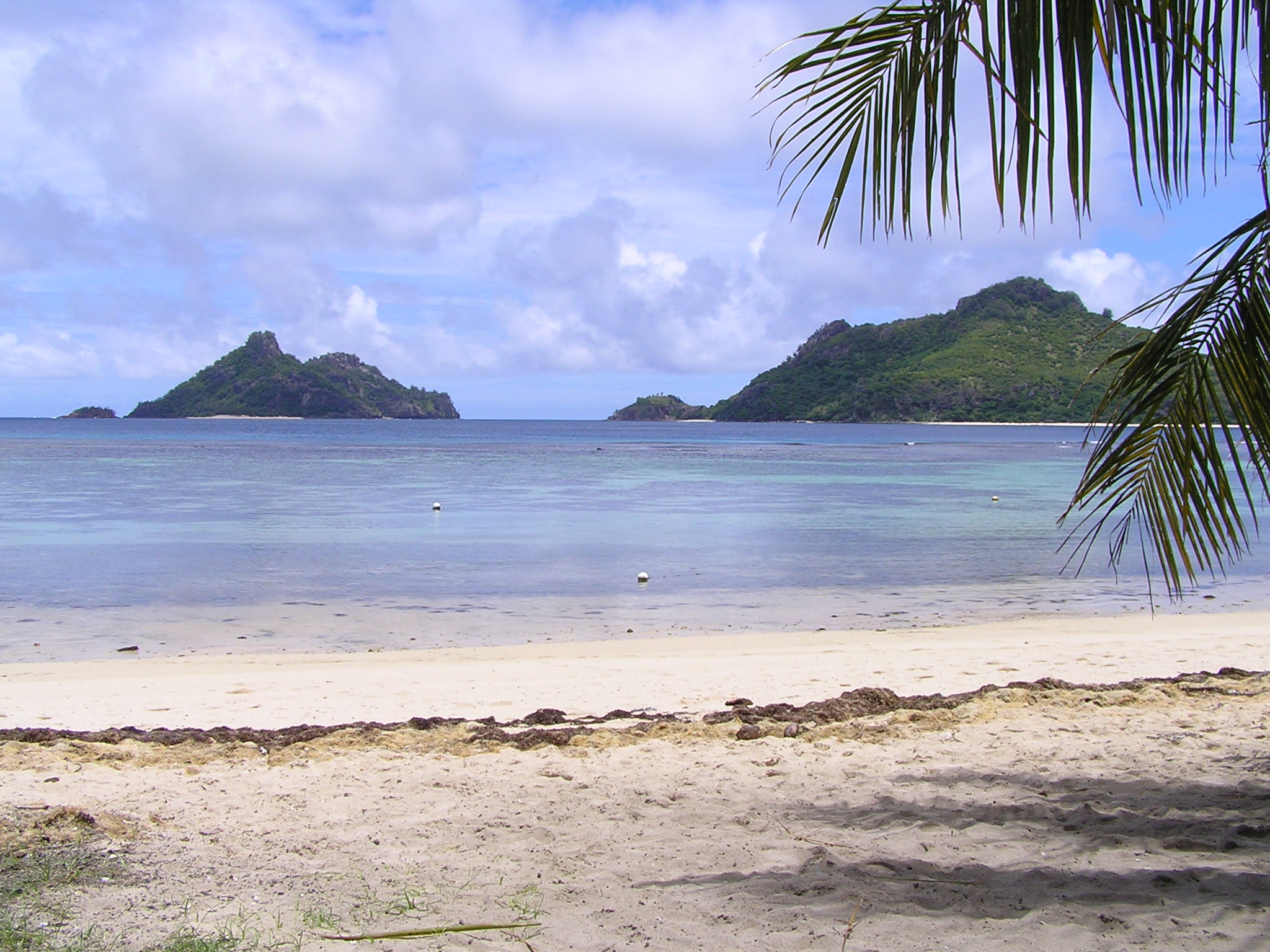
The season filmed in the Mamanuca Islands of Fiji.

Eighteen new castaways were divided into three tribes of six: Belo, Lulu, and Reba. Lulu got off to a disastrous start, and the tribe was marred further by two of its starting members quitting. The first tribe swap of the new era resulted in Lulu outsider Emily finding new life with Reba majority members Austin and Drew.

At the merge, the Reba majority (also including Dee and Julie) took strategic control of the game. They stayed intact until the final 6, at which point Dee and Julie joined surviving Belo members Jake and Katurah in blindsiding Drew. Jake defeated Katurah in the firemaking challenge to join Austin and Dee in the end, but his lack of strategic control led to him receiving no votes to win. Austin and Dee each pled their case with the moves they made, and Dee's argument that she made moves not revealed to Austin beforehand won over the jury's favor, and she was named the Sole Survivor in a 5-3-0 vote over Austin and Jake.

Survivor 45 season summary
Episode			Challenge winner(s)		Journey	Eliminated	
No.	Title	Air date	Reward	Immunity	Journey	Tribe	Player
1	"We Can Do Hard Things"	September 27, 2023	Reba	Belo	None	Lulu	Hannah
1	"We Can Do Hard Things"	September 27, 2023	Reba	Reba	None	Lulu	Hannah
2	"Brought a Bazooka to a Tea Party"	October 4, 2023	Reba		Brandon (Lulu)	Lulu	Brandon
2	"Brought a Bazooka to a Tea Party"	October 4, 2023	Reba		Bruce (Belo)	Lulu	Brandon
2	"Brought a Bazooka to a Tea Party"	October 4, 2023	Belo		Drew (Reba)	Lulu	Brandon
3	"No Man Left Behind"	October 11, 2023	Lulu	Reba	None	Lulu	Sabiyah
3	"No Man Left Behind"	October 11, 2023	Reba	Belo	None	Lulu	Sabiyah
4	"Music to My Ears"	October 18, 2023	None	Lulu	None	Reba	Sean
4	"Music to My Ears"	October 18, 2023	None	Belo	None	Reba	Sean
5	"I Don't Want to Be the Worm"	October 25, 2023	Reba		Austin (Belo)	Belo	Brando
5	"I Don't Want to Be the Worm"	October 25, 2023	Reba		J. Maya (Reba)	Belo	Brando
5	"I Don't Want to Be the Worm"	October 25, 2023	Lulu		Kellie (Lulu)	Belo	Brando
6	"I'm Not Batman, I'm the Canadian"	November 1, 2023	Austin, Bruce, Drew, Julie, Kendra, Sifu [Katurah] (Note: Katurah did not participate in the challenge after picking the odd rock, but she correctly guessed the winning team and, as a result, was also safe and joined them on the reward.)		None	None	J. Maya
7	"The Thorn in My Thumb"	November 8, 2023	Dee [Austin, Jake, Julie, Kaleb, Katurah] (Note: In addition to immunity, Dee won reward for her entire team for lasting the longest in the challenge.)	Kellie	None	Dakuwaqa	Sifu
7	"The Thorn in My Thumb"	November 8, 2023	Dee [Austin, Jake, Julie, Kaleb, Katurah]	Dee	None	Dakuwaqa	Kaleb
8	"Following a Dead Horse to Water"	November 15, 2023	Survivor Auction	Bruce	None	Dakuwaqa	Kellie
9	"Sword of Damocles"	November 22, 2023	Bruce, Julie, Kendra	Bruce	Austin, Emily, Katurah	Dakuwaqa	Kendra
10	"How Am I the Mobster?"	November 29, 2023	Emily [Dee, Julie, Katurah]	Austin	None	Dakuwaqa	Bruce
11	"This Game Rips Your Heart Out"	December 6, 2023	Drew [Austin, Jake] (Note: In addition to immunity, Drew won reward for himself and two other castaways of his choice; he chose Jake and Austin.)	Drew	Emily	Dakuwaqa	Emily
12	"The Ex-Girlfriend at the Wedding"	December 13, 2023	Austin [Dee, Katurah]	Dee	None	Dakuwaqa	Drew
13	"Living the Survivor Dream"	December 20, 2023	Austin [Jake] (Note: In addition to immunity, Austin won reward for himself and one other castaway of his choice; he chose Jake.)	Austin	None	Dakuwaqa	Julie
13	"Living the Survivor Dream"	December 20, 2023	None	Dee (Note: For winning the final Immunity Challenge, Dee had to assign additional immunity to another player, with the remaining two competing in a fire-making challenge to determine the third finalist; she gave additional immunity to Austin.) [Austin]	None	Dakuwaqa	Katurah

== Episodes ==
No. overall	No. in season	Title	Rating/share (18–49)	Original release date	U.S. viewers (millions)
649	1	"We Can Do Hard Things"	0.84/9	September 27, 2023	5.24
The 18 new castaways began their adventure.: Reward Challenge: Two tribe members moved sandbags and rope out of a crate then retrieved a key. The next pair rowed out to another key. The final pair used those keys to unlock two poles, which were used to retrieve a flint. The first tribe to free their flint won it, plus a pot and machete.; Reba won the challenge, with Brandon being tended to by medical afterwards. Brando & Jake for Belo and Kaleb & Sabiyah for Lulu volunteered for Savvy and Sweat challenge, where both pairs were tasked to do two challenges within a time limit: transport logs down the beach, and then free a flint from a puzzle structure. The first pair to do both tasks won their supplies for the tribe while the losing pair got nothing. While both pairs were able to complete the Sweat portion of the challenge, both failed to complete the Savvy puzzle. At Lulu, Emily believed Kaleb and Sabiyah were hiding an advantage after the pair told their tribemates that they did not win the camp supplies. When Brandon rejoined his tribe, Hannah told him that she wanted to quit. At Belo, Katurah, Kellie, and Kendra aligned together while Bruce struggled to rein in his leadership tendencies, despite saying that he did not want to be seen as a leader. At Reba, Sifu was caught looking for an advantage and eavesdropping on his tribemates' conversations. Austin found a Beware Advantage and was tasked with deciphering a secret phrase on his tribe's flag in the middle of camp; until he completes all of the tasks, he would be unable to vote at Tribal Council.: Immunity Challenge: Tribe members completed an obstacle course which involved a mud pit and dropping a crate by throwing coconuts in a net before completing a Survivor logo jigsaw puzzle. The first two tribes to finish won immunity while the losing tribe had to forfeit their flint.; Belo and Reba easily won immunity. At Lulu, Emily campaigned against Kaleb due to his tight alliance with Sabiyah, but the rest of the tribe wanted Emily out first due to her abrasiveness. However, at Tribal Council, Hannah decided to quit regardless of the outcome; with her tribemates' blessings and a verbal vote from the rest of the tribe, she became the first person to leave the game.
650	2	"Brought a Bazooka to a Tea Party"	0.78/9	October 4, 2023	4.88
Emily was on the outs and began searching for an idol the morning after Hannah's quit; the others stayed close by while searching themselves. Brandon found Lulu's Beware Advantage but gave it to Sabiyah, not wanting to lose his vote. Emily tried to make amends and bond with her tribemates, succeeding with Kaleb, while Sabiyah and Brandon deciphered their clue to a tree but could not retrieve the idol. At Belo, Bruce's "fun uncle" persona endeared himself to Jake but earned Katurah's ire, while Brando and Kellie found themselves in the middle after they saw the value to both remaining pairs. At Reba, a majority alliance formed between Drew, Julie, Austin, and Dee. Austin deciphered the phrase on his Beware Advantage but did not yet find the idol. The tribes were tasked with sending one player each on a journey. Bruce for Belo, Brandon for Lulu, and Drew for Reba went; Brandon divulged Lulu's tribe dynamics while Bruce remained silent. The three were then given a challenge that would give them an advantage if they won, but took their vote if they lost. Bruce elected to protect his vote and not play; Brandon lost, while Drew won a Safety Without Power advantage (good until the Final 10 Tribal Council) that he immediately told his tribemates about, proposing it to be used to benefit all of Reba. This led Austin to disclose his advantage to Drew, solidifying their alliance.: Reward/Immunity Challenge: One at a time, three tribe members smashed a target to release a key, then crossed a balance beam. Once all three keys were retrieved, the remaining two tribe members would use the keys to open puzzle pieces to solve a coral-shaped jigsaw puzzle. The first two tribes to finish won immunity plus a large fishing kit for the winning tribe and a smaller fishing kit for second place. The losing tribe would have to forfeit their flint.; Reba and Belo placed first and second respectively in a close finish after Brandon faltered in the puzzle. The majority alliance of Sabiyah, Kaleb, and Sean got the idol out of the tree, but had to burn wax surrounding it; without flint to start a fire, Sabiyah was without a vote that night, as was Brandon due to losing the journey challenge. Sabiyah hoped for Emily to go, but Kaleb and Sean lobbied for tribe strength by ousting Brandon. Emily gave Sabiyah her Shot in the Dark to build trust. At Tribal Council, Brandon was sent home unanimously.
651	3	"No Man Left Behind"	0.84/9	October 11, 2023	5.09
Emily deduced that Sabiyah did not vote, leading to more distrust between the two. At Belo, Jake had a brief medical episode but felt fine afterward. Kendra then tried to align with Jake. At Reba, Austin and Drew's search for the idol raised red flags with Dee.: Reward Challenge: Tribe members ran ashore and, one-at-a-time, tossed a ball onto an overhead track, maneuvering across ropes to catch the ball before it fell off the end. Once they all accomplished this, they tossed the balls to try and land one in a target, dropping three hooks that they would toss rings onto. The first tribe to land all three rings won a large fruit platter and the right to raid one of the other two camps, while the second tribe to finish won a smaller fruit platter.; Lulu and Reba won the challenge. Lulu chose to have Kaleb raid Reba, where he took some of their fishing gear and obtained information on Reba's dynamics. Kaleb was to give a Goodwill advantage to a member of Reba that would restore one lost vote; he chose Drew, who gave it to Austin and disclosed it to Dee and Julie. Meanwhile at Lulu, Sabiyah tried to convince Sean and Emily to blindside Kaleb due to his social prowess. At Belo, Brando and Kellie grew wary of Katurah's vendetta against Bruce. At Reba, Dee and Julie found the idol which they gave to Austin since he had the note. Austin discovered it was only good for one Tribal Council, though he could sacrifice a vote to extend it to the individual stage of the game, or sacrifice two votes to extend the idol to the final five.: Immunity Challenge: Tribes raced out with a cart, and one member retrieved keys from high up using a pole. The keys unlocked heavy puzzle pieces that went on the cart. They disassembled the cart to get the pieces through a barricade then reassembled the cart. They then used the pieces to assemble a large cube puzzle with the help of an appointed caller. The first two tribes to finish won immunity while the losing tribe had to forfeit its flint.; Lulu lost yet another challenge. Sabiyah came clean to Emily about her lack of a vote, causing Emily to tell Kaleb to vote Sabiyah to save himself. At Tribal Council, Sabiyah burned the wax surrounding her idol in the arena's fire, but when she went up to the voting booth, she discovered that her idol had the same restrictions and powers as Austin's. She chose to sacrifice her vote to extend the life of the idol, but she did not play the idol. This backfired against Sabiyah as Emily and Kaleb joined forces to blindside her out of the game.
652	4	"Music to My Ears"	0.77/8	October 18, 2023	4.92
Sean tried to do damage control after being in the minority of the last vote, but Emily did not buy it. The next morning, the first tribe swap of the new era took place: Belo consisted of Austin, Brando, Drew, Emily, and Kendra; Lulu consisted of Bruce, Jake, Kaleb, Katurah, and Kellie; Reba consisted of Dee, J. Maya, Julie, Sean, and Sifu. At Lulu, Bruce recognized the campsite as being Tika's from last season, making him emotional. Jake and Kaleb discussed aligning, while Katurah tried to sway Kaleb into voting out Bruce. At Belo, Austin and Drew tried to bring Emily into their alliance. At Reba, the four in the majority searched Sean's bag for an advantage and discovered he did not have one. J. Maya bonded with Sean and targeted Sifu.: Immunity Challenge: Tribes carried a heavy cage from the ocean to the beach. Once the cage was placed at a designated spot, one tribe member dug themselves under the cage to be the rebounder while the rest of the tribe shot balls to score into three baskets. The first two tribes to score all three balls won immunity while the losing tribe had to forfeit their flint.; Lulu and Belo won the challenge. J. Maya tried to convince Dee and Julie to blindside Sifu, who hoped to stay Reba strong and vote out Sean. Dee and Julie were torn on who to vote out. At Tribal Council, Sean changed course and stated he wanted to quit; despite Dee making a last-ditch effort to turn against Sifu, Sean was sent home after his throwaway vote on Dee, though Sifu wondered who had voted for him.
653	5	"I Don't Want to Be the Worm"	0.73/7	October 25, 2023	5.03
Sifu asked where the vote for him came from, and Dee stated she did not vote for him, even though she did. Eventually, J. Maya confessed to it just to put it behind the tribe. Dee and Julie debated siding with Sifu or J. Maya for the future. At Lulu, Bruce's bossiness wore on tribemates' nerves. At Belo, Drew was unreceptive to an attempt to align by Brando.: Reward/Immunity Challenge: One at a time, three members from each tribe raced through an obstacle course to find three keys. Another tribe member used one of the keys to unlock a long hook with which they released sandbags. Finally, each tribe had to use their sandbags and a slingshot to knock down three targets. The first two tribes to finish won immunity and spreads of fresh fish, while the losing tribe had to forfeit their flint. The first winning tribe also got to select three people, one from each tribe, to go on a journey.; Reba and Lulu won the challenge. J. Maya, Kellie, and Austin were selected for the journey.: Journey: The three had to come to a majority decision on sandwiches or an amulet advantage that would increase in power the fewer of them holding it remained in the game. Austin unsuccessfully tried to sway the women into the sandwiches, and the advantage gave the group one extra vote.; Brando offered his Shot in the Dark to Drew so that they could vote out Kendra, but Drew refused. The resulting he said-he said made Emily unsure of which side to trust. At Tribal Council, Austin sacrificed one vote to extend his idol's power then used the Goodwill advantage to gain his vote back; Emily ultimately stuck with Austin and Drew to send Brando home, much to Kendra's surprise.
654	6	"I'm Not Batman, I'm the Canadian"	0.72/7	November 1, 2023	4.86
Kendra sought revenge on Emily after her ally Brando's blindside. The following morning, Bruce found an idol under Lulu's shelter. Treemail instructed the three tribes to convene on Reba's beach to start the individual phase of the game. The former members of Reba affirmed their intent to target J. Maya, since voting her out would burn the fewest bridges among the tribe, but Bruce's paranoia over not being approached for strategy unnerved several tribemates.: Reward/Immunity Challenge: Divided into two teams of six by random draw (with one castaway drawing the odd rock and not participating), one player at a time crawled through the mud under a heavy net and moved to a heavy cart. When all team members made it to the cart, they pushed it across the field and over obstacles to a tower, collecting sandbags as they went. Using the sandbags, they built a pile on the cart in order to get up the tower to retrieve a key. They then slid down a net and ran to a large rock. Using teamwork, they climbed the rock to reach a platform. Using the key, one player unlocked puzzle pieces. Two players then solved the puzzle, revealing clues to a word puzzle. Two other players then used the clues to solve the word puzzle. The winners received their merge tribe buffs, immunity, and a food reward at the Survivor Sanctuary.; Katurah chose to back the blue team of Austin, Bruce, Drew, Julie, Kendra, and Sifu; they won the challenge, giving Katurah immunity. J. Maya became the consensus target of that group, but Kendra and Bruce tried to shift the target onto Kaleb due to his social prowess. Emily warned Kaleb that his name came up, and at Tribal Council, he openly called J. Maya the biggest threat. This led the entire tribe (sans Austin, who sacrificed his vote to extend his idol for the final five) to vote Kaleb, but his successful Shot in the Dark negated all votes against him. The ensuing scramble saw J. Maya targeting Emily, but the rest of the tribe voted J. Maya out. The remaining castaways merged, with Austin and Kellie's amulets upgraded to one steal-a-vote.
655	7	"The Thorn in My Thumb"	0.71/7	November 8, 2023	4.53
Back at camp, Kaleb celebrated his luck at the last Tribal Council, while Bruce publicly called Katurah out for her hesitation in voting Kaleb out. Kendra and Katurah expressed their interest in targeting Bruce next, while Kellie disagreed, viewing him as a shield that could protect her and her allies in the future.: Reward/Immunity Challenge: In their first individual immunity challenge, survivors were divided into two groups by random draw. Survivors had to hang on to a tall pole for as long as possible, with whoever lasting the longest from each group winning immunity. The last person remaining of everyone also won a visit to the Survivor Sanctuary for a food reward for their group. Additionally, that winning group would go to Tribal Council second, with each group voting someone out separately; the winning group's voted out member would join the jury, while the losing group's voted out member would not.; The first group was made up of Bruce, Drew, Emily, Kellie, Kendra, and Sifu, with the second group consisting of Austin, Dee, Jake, Julie, Kaleb, and Katurah. Dee won immunity as well as the reward for her group, while Kellie won immunity for her group. Kellie's group settled on the prime targets of Bruce and Sifu due to Bruce's bossiness and Sifu's wildcard reputation; however, with the threat of Bruce's idol and his potential as a shield, they chose Sifu, voting him out unanimously. With the other group, Dee used her newfound immunity power to establish Kaleb as the clear next target. On the other hand, Kaleb and Jake planned on roping Katurah into voting Julie, forcing a split vote and relying on Austin to flip on the revote. However, Katurah sided with Dee after learning that Bruce's idol was kept from her, and Kaleb was sent home, becoming the first jury member.
656	8	"Following a Dead Horse to Water"	0.77/8	November 15, 2023	5.14
Jake confessed to being the other vote against Julie, causing Julie to lose trust in Jake. The remaining women discussed aligning against the men. Treemail the next morning alluded to the return of the Survivor Auction, but castaways had to find bamboo tubes containing money. Bruce ended up with the fewest tubes.: Survivor Auction: Jeff pulled a random number between 6 and 15 out of a bag to determine how many items would be up for bid; this number would be undisclosed to the castaways. The person with the highest amount of money left at the end of the auction would lose their vote at the next Tribal Council. Despite having the lowest amount of money going into the auction, Bruce had the highest amount remaining and lost his vote.; Emily hinted to Drew that a women's alliance was in the works, and Bruce became the primary target.: Immunity Challenge: Castaways held onto a rope tethered to one third of their pre-game body weight. At regular intervals, they would move one knot down, making it heavier. If they let go of the rope, they were eliminated. The last person left standing won immunity.; Bruce won immunity, foiling the tribe's plan to oust him. They settled on targeting Jake instead, but Drew got an idea to gather his Reba 4 alliance and Emily to target a strong player in Kellie so that they could safely split the next vote between Bruce and Jake in case of any advantages. At Tribal Council, Jake played his Shot in the Dark which failed, but Drew's plan came to fruition, sending a shell-shocked and devastated Kellie to the jury. With that vote, Austin's amulet matured into a full idol, giving him two idols, and Drew's Safety Without Power expired.
657	9	"Sword of Damocles"	0.85/9	November 22, 2023	4.90
Kendra wanted Dee out for going against their girls' alliance, while Bruce was hurt upon discovering that Kellie had been targeting him. Treemail the next morning instructed the castaways to divide into three groups and hinted at "panic and anxiety"; this prompted Austin to lend one of his idols to Julie.: Reward/Immunity Challenge: The teams ran this challenge in stages. In the first stage, castaways traversed two balance beams holding a ball on a disc before retrieving three ropes from a sand pit. The last place team would be eliminated from the challenge and all three lost their vote, having to go on a journey to try and earn it back. In the second stage, castaways traversed an obstacle by hooking ropes in front of them, then tossed three balls on a target. The first team to land all three balls won a trip to the sanctuary with rotisserie chicken and the right to compete for individual immunity. In the final stage, castaways had their arms outstretched with their fingertips bracing two discs. If a disc dropped, that castaway was out. The last one left standing won immunity.; Austin, Emily, and Katurah were the first team eliminated, while Bruce, Julie, and Kendra won reward. Bruce won his second straight immunity challenge. Following the chellenge, Austin, Emily, and Katurah were sent on a journey.: Journey: At the journey, The three had to solve a math problem. Failure to do so would mean forfeiting their vote at the next trical council. Austin earned his vote back by solving the problem while Katurah and Emily were unable to do so.; Back at camp, Austin told the tribemates outside of his alliance that he had also failed. Dee wanted to vote out Kendra upon realizing the latter had targeted her, but most of the tribe wanted to stick with the safe vote and send Jake home. At Tribal Council, the tribe instead followed Dee's lead to send Kendra to the jury.
658	10	"How Am I the Mobster?"	0.80/9	November 29, 2023	5.02
Bruce told Katurah and Jake that he had given Kellie his idol to avoid a potential Knowledge is Power being played, but told Katurah that it was a ruse to get people off his scent.: Reward Challenge: Castaways grabbed a ball on their way through several obstacles, then maneuvered that ball through a table maze. The first person to land their ball in the center won an overnight trip to the sanctuary with a turkey dinner and letters from home.; Emily won the challenge and selected Julie, Katurah, and Dee to join her. Meanwhile, Jake grew frustrated with people giving him the run-around in the game, so he proposed Drew as a target, which led to conflict between the two.: Immunity Challenge: Castaways held themselves on a slanted board over water, bracing themselves with narrow handholds. If they fell, they were out. The last one left standing won immunity.; Austin outlasted Bruce for immunity. The majority agreed to target Bruce over Jake, while Emily tried to convince Bruce that she was targeting Julie as she was well-liked among the tribe, in an effort to get Bruce to not play his idol. At Tribal Council, Bruce did not play his idol, and he was sent to the jury with it in his pocket.
659	11	"This Game Rips Your Heart Out"	0.81/9	December 6, 2023	4.84
The tribe celebrated voting out Bruce, while Austin and Dee's relationship grew. Emily admitted to making Bruce feel comfortable enough to not play his idol, which increased her threat level in her tribemates' eyes. The next morning, the tribe was tasked with sending one member on a journey; the tribe drew rocks, and Emily drew the odd rock. She was given a chance for an immunity advantage if she could solve the "Savvy" puzzle from day 1, but she chose to protect her vote and not participate. At camp, Julie was revealed to still be holding onto Austin's idol that expired at final 5 (whereas the amulet in Austin's possession expired at final 6), and Drew suggested she make a big move with it, which put Julie on alert. She tried to gather support to vote out Emily.: Reward/Immunity Challenge: Castaways untangled rope from a starting point then took it over and under beams once they felt they had enough to make it to a sandbag throwing station. They used three sandbags to knock over lettered blocks, which they used to spell "resourcefulness" on both sides forming an arch. The first castaway to successfully spell the word won immunity and a barbeque reward at camp.; Drew won the challenge and chose to share the reward with Jake and Austin. They determined that Julie was the biggest threat, while everyone else besides Dee agreed. Austin did not want to burn the bridge with Dee, so he told her that Julie was the target. Dee then told Julie, who was angry and targeted Austin out of revenge. Dee instructed her to vote for Emily instead, as she did not want to lose Austin, while she would join the others in voting Julie to not tip off her allies that she told her about the plan. At Tribal Council, Julie played the idol to negate all 6 of her tribemates' votes. Austin chose to keep his idol, and Julie's vote sent Emily to the jury.
660	12	"The Ex-Girlfriend at the Wedding"	0.84/9	December 13, 2023	5.33
Katurah searched for a new idol; Austin and Dee followed suit.: Reward Challenge: Tribe members started on platforms in the water. They then had to swim and walk to shore through the water to a barrel. Tipping the barrel on its side, they had to climb on and using hanging ropes to steady themselves, using their feet, they rolled the barrels down a track collecting three keys along the way. At the end of the track, they used the keys to unlock a slide puzzle. The winner would chose two other members to join them on a helicopter ride out to a sand spit for a picnic.; Austin won reward and chose to share it with Dee and Katurah in hopes that Drew and Jake would keep Julie from strategizing against him. Instead, Jake found the idol and vowed to make a big move with it.: Immunity Challenge: Castaways balanced on one foot on a platform with the other foot on one end of a hinged beam with a ball on the other end. The last tribe member with a ball still on the beam won immunity.; Dee won immunity. Jake tried to convince Julie to blindside Drew, but unbeknownst to him, Dee and Katurah were plotting the same thing. Austin and Drew targeted Julie. At Tribal Council, Austin played his amulet idol on himself since it would expire after that vote. However, no votes were cast against him, and his closest ally Drew was sent to the jury. Following Tribal Council, the final five were sent to a new camp with minimal supplies.
661	13	"Living the Survivor Dream"	0.84/9	December 20, 2023	4.73
At their new camp the morning after, the final five found a combination box on the beach with instructions for an advantage reward. They competed for the advantage by racing out to stations and counting the number of objects at each station and used those numbers to solve the combination on the box. Jake was the first tribe member to enter the correct sequence of numbers thus winning the advantage.: Reward/Immunity Challenge: Castaways had to low crawl under an obstacle and then dig up a machete. Using the machete they cut a rope dropping a pile of sandbags which they tossed into three baskets releasing a set of numbers. They then used that set of numbers to release a set of keys which were then used to unlock a set of puzzle pieces. The first one to solve the puzzle won immunity and a reward.; Jake's advantage was that he only had to land one sandbag rather than three, but he squandered this lead after forgetting to bring his keys to the puzzle station, then overlooking a puzzle piece. Austin won the challenge and chose Jake to join him for the reward of a steak dinner at the Survivor Sanctuary. Katurah tried to sway people into voting out Dee, while Jake wanted to make a huge impact on the game with his idol. At Tribal Council, everyone that could receive votes received at least one; Jake played his idol for Katurah, but despite her wanting to get Dee out, she switched her vote to send Julie to the jury. Upon returning to camp, Jake was upset that Katurah had made him swear on his family to vote against Dee, leading to an argument.: Immunity Challenge: Castaways had to maneuver through a grid of ropes while using a long pole to place ceramic bowls on a perch. The perch was attached to the rope grid so any disturbance would topple the bowls off the perch. The first one to stack all their bowls on the perch won immunity.; Dee and Jake were neck-and-neck until Jake dropped everything late in the challenge. In his frustration and rush to get back, he accidentally broke the challenge, resulting in a disqualification. Dee held strong to win her third individual immunity necklace. Back at camp, Katurah, Jake and Austin each had a chance to plead their case with Dee. Dee made it clear she would take Austin, but reconsidered after Austin told her of Jake's lackluster fire making ability. However, she took Austin, leaving Jake and Katurah to make fire.: Fire Making Challenge: With Dee choosing Austin to go with her to final three, Jake and Katurah faced off in the fire making challenge. Both were quick to start their fires, but Katurah's started and went out quickly multiple times. All the while Jake carefully fed his fire into a towering inferno defeating Katurah and sending her to the jury.; At the Final Tribal Council, Dee and Austin each pled their cases with the moves they made, while Jake's game was not as highlighted due to his lack of control. Dee revealed that she did not tell Austin about her telling Julie to play her idol, which swung the jury in her favor. They awarded Dee the million dollars and the title of Sole Survivor in a 5–3–0 vote over Austin and Jake.

== Voting history ==
Survivor 45 voting history
	Original tribes			Switched tribes		No tribes		Merged tribe								
Episode	1	2	3	4	5	6		7		8	9	10	11	12	13	
Day	3	5	7	9	11	13		14 (Note: On Day 14, a split Tribal Council was held. The castaways were divided into two groups of six; each group went to Tribal Council separately to eliminate one castaway from each.)		16	17	19	21	23	24	25
Tribe	Lulu	Lulu	Lulu	Reba	Belo	None		Dakuwaqa	Dakuwaqa	Dakuwaqa	Dakuwaqa	Dakuwaqa	Dakuwaqa	Dakuwaqa	Dakuwaqa	Dakuwaqa
Eliminated	Hannah	Brandon	Sabiyah	Sean	Brando	None	J. Maya	Sifu	Kaleb	Kellie	Kendra	Bruce	Emily	Drew	Julie	Katurah
Votes	Quit (Note: No vote; Hannah chose to quit the game. An audible vote confirmed she would be unanimously voted out.)	3–0	2–1	3–1–1	3–2	0–0 (Note: Kaleb successfully played the Shot in the Dark; therefore eleven votes against him were not counted. As all of the remaining players had voted for Kaleb, and as Kaleb had sacrificed his vote to play the Shot in the Dark, a re-vote was held.)	10–1	5–1	4–2	5–3	6–1	4–3–1	1–0 (Note: Julie played a hidden immunity idol on herself, therefore six votes against her were not counted.)	4–2	2–1–1–0 (Note: Jake played a hidden immunity idol on Katurah, therefore one vote against her was not counted.)	None (Note: For winning the final Immunity Challenge, Dee had to assign additional immunity to another player, with the remaining two competing in a fire-making challenge to determine the third finalist; she gave additional immunity to Austin, and Jake defeated Katurah in the fire-making challenge.)
Voter	Vote															Challenge
Dee				Sifu		~~Kaleb~~	J. Maya		Kaleb	Kellie	Kendra	Jake	~~Julie~~	Drew	~~Katurah~~	Immune
Austin					Brando (Note: Austin chose to sacrifice his vote in order to extend the lifespan of his Immunity Idol, but used the Goodwill Advantage to restore his vote.)	None (Note: This player sacrificed their vote for the round in an attempt to gain an advantage or expand an advantage's lifespan.)			Kaleb	Kellie	Kendra (Note: For coming in last in the immunity challenge, Austin, Emily, and Katurah lost their votes at Tribal Council, but Austin regained his.)	Jake	~~Julie~~	Julie	Julie	Saved
Jake						~~Kaleb~~	J. Maya		Julie	None (Note: This player played the Shot in the Dark, and as a result, had to sacrifice that night's vote.)	Kendra	Bruce	~~Julie~~	Drew	Dee	Won
Katurah						~~Kaleb~~	J. Maya		Kaleb	Jake	None	Bruce	~~Julie~~	Drew	Julie	Lost
Julie				Sean		~~Kaleb~~	J. Maya		Kaleb	Kellie	Kendra	Bruce	Emily	Drew	Jake	
Drew					Brando	~~Kaleb~~	J. Maya	Sifu		Kellie	Kendra	Jake	~~Julie~~	Julie		
Emily		Brandon	Sabiyah		Brando	~~Kaleb~~	J. Maya	Sifu		Kellie	None	Bruce	~~Julie~~			
Bruce						~~Kaleb~~	J. Maya	Sifu		None (Note: Bruce lost his vote at Tribal Council due to having the most money at the end of the Survivor Auction.)	Kendra	Julie				
Kendra					Drew	~~Kaleb~~	J. Maya	Sifu		Jake	Jake					
Kellie						~~Kaleb~~	J. Maya	Sifu		Jake						
Kaleb		Brandon	Sabiyah			None			Julie							
Sifu				Sean		~~Kaleb~~	J. Maya	Bruce								
J. Maya				Sean		~~Kaleb~~	Emily									
Brando					Drew											
Sean		Brandon	Kaleb	Dee												
Sabiyah		None (Note: This player lost a vote attempting to gain an advantage.)	None													
Brandon		None														
Hannah	Quit															

Jury vote
Episode	13		
Day	26		
Finalist	Dee	Austin	Jake
Votes	5–3–0		
Juror	Vote		
Katurah	Yes		
Julie	Yes		
Drew		Yes	
Emily	Yes		
Bruce		Yes	
Kendra		Yes	
Kellie	Yes		
Kaleb	Yes		

== Production ==
On February 21, 2023, CBS renewed Survivor for its forty-fifth and forty-sixth seasons. Season 45, which was the fifth aired since the onset of the COVID-19 pandemic, continued to observe the strict safety protocols introduced in season 41, thus it continued to feature the reduced 26 days of gameplay, with 18 contestants starting in three tribes, as with every season since then. A sneak peek for the season was aired at the finale of the previous season, where it was revealed that Bruce Perreault, a contestant who was medically evacuated in the previous season, would return for the forty-fifth season. Previously, host Jeff Probst had offered an open invitation to Perreault to return for a future installment of the show, citing that he "didn't think that Bruce got his fair share of Survivor".

As a result of the ongoing 2023 Writers Guild of America strike, this season, along with The Amazing Race 35, aired 90-minute long episodes to fill the timeslots left vacant by scripted shows. This marks the first time in which the show had regular episodes that exceed the regular 60 minutes allotted for the show.

== Reception ==
Survivor 45 received mainly positive reviews. Praise was directed toward the season's strong cast, character-driven storytelling, strategic gameplay, and the shift to longer 90-minute episodes that revived the show's classic feel. Entertainment Weekly's Dalton Ross ranked the season 20th out of 45, praising the season's unpredictability, cast, and editing. In 2024, Nick Caruso of TVLine ranked this season 23rd out of 47.
