= Survivor 43 =

- Season 43
- Presented by: Jeff Probst
- No. of days: 26
- No. of castaways: 18
- Winner: Mike Gabler
- Runner-up: Cassidy Clark
- Location: Mamanuca Islands, Fiji
- No. of episodes: 13

Release
- Original network: CBS
- Original release: September 21 – December 14, 2022

Additional information
- Filming dates: May 2 – May 27, 2022

Season chronology
- ← Previous; Survivor 42 Next → Survivor 44

Survivor 43 is the forty-third season of the American reality television series Survivor. The show was filmed from May 2 through May 27, 2022, in Fiji, for an eleventh consecutive season; it premiered on September 21, 2022, on CBS in the United States.

The season concluded on December 14, 2022; Mike Gabler was named the winner of the season, defeating Cassidy Clark and Owen Knight in a 7–1–0 vote. Gabler, aged 51, was the second oldest winner, after Bob Crowley, who was 57 years old at the time of winning Survivor: Gabon. Gabler has stated he intends on donating the one million dollar prize to charity. This is the only season in Survivor history where the oldest contestant of the season was the winner.

== Format ==
Survivor is a reality television show based on the Swedish show Expedition Robinson, created by Mark Burnett and Charlie Parsons. The series follows a number of participants isolated in a remote location, where they must provide food, fire, and shelter. One by one, a participant is removed from the series by majority vote, with challenges held to give a reward (ranging from living- and food-related prizes to a car) and immunity from being voted out of the series. The last remaining player receives a prize of $1,000,000.

== Contestants ==
Cast of Survivor 43. Eventual winner Mike Gabler among the middle group in the far-right position.

The cast was announced on August 31, 2022, and consists of 18 new players divided into three tribes: Baka, Coco, and Vesi. The merged tribe was called Gaia, a name suggested by contestant Cassidy Clark. Among the contestants was Paralympic 100 meter runner Noelle Lambert, who is the third amputee overall to play Survivor, following Chad Crittenden in Survivor: Vanuatu and Kelly Bruno in Survivor: Nicaragua.

List of Survivor 43 contestants
| Contestant | Age | From | Tribe | | | Finish | |
| Contestant | Age | From | Original | None | Merged | Placement | Day |
|---|---|---|---|---|---|---|---|
| Morriah Young | 28 | Philadelphia, Pennsylvania | Baka | | | 1st voted out | Day 3 |
| Justine Brennan | 29 | Marina del Rey, California | Vesi | | | 2nd voted out | Day 5 |
| Nneka Ejere | 43 | Weatherford, Texas | Vesi | | | 3rd voted out | Day 7 |
| Lindsay Carmine | 42 | Downingtown, Pennsylvania | Coco | | | 4th voted out | Day 9 |
| Geo Bustamante | 36 | Honolulu, Hawaii | Coco | | | 5th voted out | Day 11 |
| Elisabeth "Elie" Scott | 31 | Salt Lake City, Utah | Baka | None (Note: At the start of the individual phase of the game on Day 12, players had to earn their way into the merged tribe by either winning immunity or surviving the Day 13 Tribal Council.) | | 6th voted out | Day 13 |
| Dwight Moore | 22 | Collierville, Tennessee | Vesi | None | Gaia | 7th voted out | Day 14 |
| Jeanine Zheng | 24 | San Francisco, California | Baka | None | Gaia | 8th voted out 1st jury member | Day 16 |
| James Jones | 37 | Philadelphia, Pennsylvania | Coco | None | Gaia | 9th voted out 2nd jury member | Day 17 |
| Ryan Medrano | 25 | El Paso, Texas | Coco | None | Gaia | 10th voted out 3rd jury member | Day 17 |
| Noelle Lambert | 25 | Manchester, New Hampshire | Vesi | None | Gaia | 11th voted out 4th jury member | Day 19 |
| Sami Layadi | 19 | Las Vegas, Nevada | Baka | None | Gaia | 12th voted out 5th jury member | Day 21 |
| Cody Assenmacher | 35 | Honolulu, Hawaii | Vesi | None | Gaia | 13th voted out 6th jury member | Day 23 |
| Karla Cruz Godoy | 28 | Newark, Delaware | Coco | None | Gaia | 14th voted out 7th jury member | Day 24 |
| Jesse Lopez | 30 | Durham, North Carolina | Vesi | None | Gaia | Eliminated; 8th jury member | Day 25 |
| Owen Knight | 30 | New Orleans, Louisiana | Baka | None | Gaia | 2nd runner-up | Day 26 |
| Cassidy Clark | 26 | Austin, Texas | Coco | None | Gaia | Runner-up | Day 26 |
| Mike Gabler | 51 | Meridian, Idaho | Baka | None | Gaia | Sole Survivor | Day 26 |

=== Future appearances ===
Outside of Survivor, Cassidy Clark competed on the second season of The Challenge: USA. In 2025, Noelle Lambert and Ryan Medrano competed on the second season of Raid the Cage. Lambert, Sami Layadi, and Jesse Lopez competed on Beast Games: Strong vs. Smart.

== Season summary ==
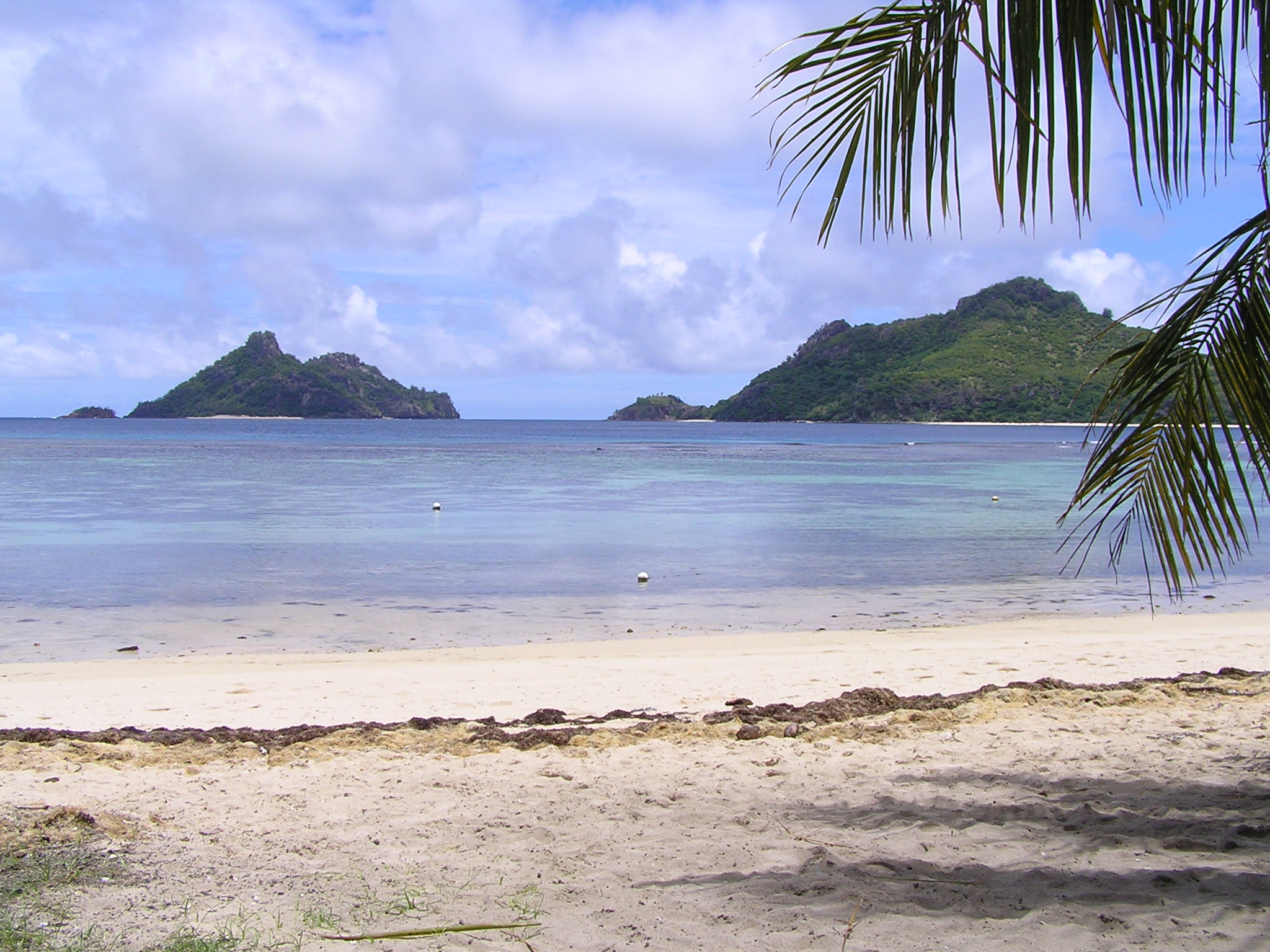
The season filmed in the Mamanuca Islands of Fiji.

Eighteen new castaways were divided into three tribes of six: Baka, Coco, and Vesi. The tribes fared relatively equally in challenges, but Baka and Vesi teamed up in the later ones against Coco, who had yet to see Tribal Council after three eliminations. Tribe dynamics saw Elie and Jeanine in the minority of Baka, Ryan on the outs of Coco, and two pairs on Vesi (Cody-Jesse and Dwight-Noelle).

At the merge, Baka and Vesi initially planned to join forces, but a series of votes left Baka in the minority instead. Cody and Jesse then took the reins, orchestrating the blindsides of various threats. Jesse, who had obtained advantages from other castaways, then blindsided Cody using the latter's own idol. This ultimately made him a big threat, and he was defeated in the firemaking challenge by Gabler from Baka.

At the Final Tribal Council, former Coco Cassidy highlighted the moves she made, but many jurors called her out for making those moves behind other player's shadows. Owen was criticized for never having control, and Gabler's social game earned the jury's respect. Thus, Gabler was named the Sole Survivor in a 7-1-0 vote over Cassidy and Owen. That one vote was the only vote that stopped Gabler from playing the 3rd ever prefect game.

Survivor 43 season summary
| Episode | | | Challenge winner(s) | | Journey | Eliminated | |
| No. | Title | Air date | Reward | Immunity | Journey | Tribe | Player |
|---|---|---|---|---|---|---|---|
| 1 | "LIVIN" | September 21, 2022 | Vesi | Coco | Dwight (Vesi) | Baka | Morriah |
| 1 | "LIVIN" | September 21, 2022 | Vesi | Coco | Gabler (Baka) | Baka | Morriah |
| 1 | "LIVIN" | September 21, 2022 | Vesi | Vesi | Karla (Coco) | Baka | Morriah |
| 2 | "Lovable Curmudgeon" | September 28, 2022 | Baka | | None | Vesi | Justine |
| 2 | "Lovable Curmudgeon" | September 28, 2022 | Coco | | None | Vesi | Justine |
| 3 | "I'll Sign The Divorce Papers" | October 5, 2022 | Baka | | James (Coco) | Vesi | Nneka |
| 3 | "I'll Sign The Divorce Papers" | October 5, 2022 | Baka | | Noelle (Vesi) | Vesi | Nneka |
| 3 | "I'll Sign The Divorce Papers" | October 5, 2022 | Coco | | Owen (Baka) | Vesi | Nneka |
| 4 | "Show No Mercy" | October 12, 2022 | Vesi | Vesi | None | Coco | Lindsay |
| 4 | "Show No Mercy" | October 12, 2022 | Vesi | Baka | None | Coco | Lindsay |
| 5 | "Stop With All the Niceness" | October 19, 2022 | Vesi | | Geo (Coco) | Coco | Geo |
| 5 | "Stop With All the Niceness" | October 19, 2022 | Vesi | | Jeanine (Baka) | Coco | Geo |
| 5 | "Stop With All the Niceness" | October 19, 2022 | Baka | | Jesse (Vesi) | Coco | Geo |
| 6 | "Mergatory" | October 26, 2022 | Dwight, Gabler, Jeanine, Jesse, Karla, Ryan [Noelle] (Note: Noelle did not participate in the challenge after picking the odd rock, but she correctly guessed the winning team and, as a result, was also safe and joined them on the reward.) | | None | None | Elie |
| 7 | "Bull in a China Shop" | November 2, 2022 | None | Gabler | None | Gaia | Dwight |
| 8 | "Proposterous" | November 9, 2022 | None | Owen | None | Gaia | Jeanine |
| 9 | "What About the Big Girls" | November 16, 2022 | Cody [Cassidy, Gabler, Jesse, Ryan] (Note: In addition to immunity, Cody won reward for his entire team for lasting the longest in the challenge.) | Karla | None | Gaia | James |
| 9 | "What About the Big Girls" | November 16, 2022 | Cody [Cassidy, Gabler, Jesse, Ryan] | Cody | None | Gaia | Ryan |
| 10 | "Get That Money, Baby" | November 23, 2022 | Noelle [Jesse, Owen, Sami] | Cassidy | None | Gaia | Noelle |
| 11 | "Hiding in Plain Sight" | November 30, 2022 | None | Karla & Owen (Note: Because the challenge ran excessively long, Jeff ended it, with both Karla and Owen winning immunity.) [Cody] (Note: Cody was also granted immunity after finding a "Choose Your Champion" advantage and correctly guessing Owen as the winner of the challenge.) | None | Gaia | Sami |
| 12 | "Telenovela" | December 7, 2022 | Cody, Karla, Owen | Cassidy | None | Gaia | Cody |
| 13 | "Snap Some Necks and Cash Some Checks" | December 14, 2022 | Owen [Cassidy] (Note: In addition to immunity, Owen won reward for himself and one other castaway of his choice; he chose Cassidy.) | Owen | None | Gaia | Karla |
| 13 | "Snap Some Necks and Cash Some Checks" | December 14, 2022 | None | Cassidy (Note: For winning the final Immunity Challenge, Cassidy had to assign additional immunity to another player, with the remaining two competing in a fire-making challenge to determine the third finalist; she gave additional immunity to Owen.) [Owen] | None | Gaia | Jesse |

== Episodes ==
| No. overall | No. in season | Title | Rating/share (18–49) | Original release date | U.S. viewers (millions) |
|---|---|---|---|---|---|
| 623 | 1 | "LIVIN" | 0.8/7 | September 21, 2022 | 5.05 |
The 18 new castaways arrived in Fiji to begin Survivor 43.: Reward Challenge: Two tribe members raced into the jungle for crates. Two other tribe members then retrieved a boat full of crates from the ocean. The last two members would assemble the crates to make a cube, which one tribe member would climb to retrieve a flint hanging above them. The first to obtain the flint won it, as well as a pot and machete, for their tribe. The two losing tribes would have to complete either a "savvy" or "sweat" challenge at camp within a time limit to earn their supplies.; Vesi won reward. As Vesi set up their camp, Noelle bonded with Justine, while Cody, Jesse, and Nneka aligned and were wary of Justine's perceived ability to manipulate. Vesi struggled with starting their fire. Coco chose "sweat" while Baka chose "savvy", and both were able to complete their tasks in time. The women aligned on both Coco and Baka, with the Coco women bringing in James for a majority. Also on Coco, Karla and Geo bonded due to both being LGBT+. Karla, Gabler, and Dwight went to the summit, where Karla protected her vote. Gabler's risk paid off in the form of an idol good for his next two Tribal Councils (which he immediately let the entire tribe know about), while Dwight lost his vote. Cody and Jesse distrusted Dwight's story upon his return to camp.: Immunity Challenge: Tribes traversed an obstacle course, with one member opening the way at each obstacle. The first to get to the table game portion got their choice of one of three games, while the second got to pick between one of the remaining two. The first two tribes to complete their chosen table game won immunity, while the losing tribe had to forfeit their flint.; Coco and Vesi won the challenge. Gabler, who struggled in the challenge, publicly declared he would take his Shot in the Dark rather than playing his idol. However, Elie didn't want to vote out Gabler due to his work ethic and tried to talk Jeanine into voting out Morriah, perceiving her as the physically weakest. Morriah brought Sami into her alliance, and they discussed blindsiding Owen. However, at Tribal Council, Morriah was voted out unanimously.
| 624 | 2 | "Lovable Curmudgeon" | 0.7/6 | September 28, 2022 | 4.57 |
A heavy storm rolled into Baka's camp soon after Tribal Council, which especially took a toll on Gabler. Sami proposed a guys' alliance with Gabler and Owen while Elie and Jeanine were away from camp. At Coco, Geo and Ryan's friendship strengthened, while Karla found herself in the middle between the girls' alliance with James and her alliance with Geo and Ryan. At Vesi, Jesse and Dwight were likewise in the middle between the pairs of Justine-Noelle and Cody-Nneka.: Immunity/Reward Challenge: Tribes swam towards a bamboo cage, where they retrieved a heavy floating snake filled with numbered discs and hauled it to shore. Once on land, another tribe member used the discs to solve a combination lock and release puzzle pieces, which two tribe members used to assemble a giant Survivor 43 puzzle. The first two tribes to finish won immunity, as well as large and small fishing gear rewards respectively, while the losing tribe had to forfeit their flint.; Baka and Coco won the challenge. Nneka was targeted due to struggling throughout the challenge, but Jesse and Dwight had different ideas of whom to align with. Dwight wanted to side with the girls, but Jesse was more wary of Justine. Cody found a beware advantage and opened it, forcing him to retrieve beads from the bags of his willing tribemates to make an idol bracelet or else he'd lose his vote. With Dwight already without a vote, Cody scrambled to earn his vote back, which he was able to do before Tribal Council. Jesse ultimately chose to side with Cody and Nneka to send Justine home after her and Noelle's split vote sealed their alliance's fate.
| 625 | 3 | "I'll Sign the Divorce Papers" | 0.8/7 | October 5, 2022 | 5.15 |
Though Dwight's trust in Jesse lessened, he still hoped to work with him and Noelle. At Baka, Sami informed Gabler that Elie and Jeanine searched his bag for information about his idol, turning Gabler against the women. At Coco, Karla found the same beware advantage Cody found on Vesi and decided to open it after initially leaving it; she was able to barter for the required beads to obtain Coco's idol bracelet.: Immunity/Reward Challenge: Three tribe members jumped into the water off a high platform one at a time, then off a stack of floating crates before retrieving a submerged buoy with a key attached. Once every member retrieved their buoy, the remaining two tribe members used the keys to unlock puzzle pieces and solve a turtle block puzzle. The first two tribes to finish won immunity, as well as large and small toolkits and fruit platters respectively, while the losing tribe had to forfeit their flint.; Baka and Coco won the challenge. Noelle, James, and Owen were sent to the summit, where Noelle promised loyalty to the men if all three were to make the merge. As such, James and Owen protected their votes, allowing Noelle to earn a steal-a-vote advantage. Cody and Jesse were reluctant to vote out Nneka but acknowledged the need for strength in challenges. At Tribal Council, they sided with Dwight and Noelle to send Nneka home.
| 626 | 4 | "Show No Mercy" | 0.7/6 | October 12, 2022 | 5.03 |
Gabler got on his tribemates' nerves at Baka with his overbearing demeanor.: Reward Challenge: One tribe member used sandbags to completely knock down a stack of wooden blocks, before using two of the blocks to traverse across an area without their feet touching the ground. Once that castaway finished, the three remaining tribe members attempted to land sandbags on different sized disc shaped platforms. The first tribe to finish won ten fish, as well as a camp raid, a reward where they could steal one item from a losing tribe's camp.; After Vesi's victory, Noelle asked Jeff if they could trade the fish since they didn't have their flint; Jeff agreed to trade them an earlier reward, and they could still partake in the raid. Though Baka had the better fishing kit, Cody sought to weaken the still-intact Coco tribe by taking their machete, which some of his tribemates objected to. Instead, Cody used Coco's machete as leverage to negotiate for multiple food items, causing Karla to think Cody got more than he bargained for.: Immunity Challenge: Tribes raced to knock heavy sandbags off tables while searching for a key, before using it to unlock a net crawl, and transport four large puzzle pieces underneath it. Once across, they used the pieces to form a perfect cube, then disassembled it, hauled the pieces to the top of a tower via cargo net and reassembled it into a triangle. The first two tribes to finish won immunity, while the losing tribe had to forfeit their flint.; Vesi placed first, then openly provided oral advice to Baka so they could complete their puzzle before Coco. With their first Tribal Council looming, Geo wanted to vote out Cassidy, while the women's alliance with James decided to vote out Geo. However, Lindsay's paranoia got the better of her as she hounded tribemates on whether or not she was safe, which raised red flags with her allies. At Tribal Council, Geo cast a stray vote against Cassidy, while everyone else united to send Lindsay home.
| 627 | 5 | "Stop with All the Niceness" | 0.7/5 | October 19, 2022 | 4.91 |
Cassidy's trust in Geo diminished after learning he voted for her at the previous Tribal Council. Cassidy and Karla spoke about blindsiding him or Ryan should Coco lose again. Jeanine and Elie found Baka's idol bracelet, and reluctantly shared it with Owen after being caught. Elie informed Sami of the advantage, and Jeanine bartered successfully for all of her required beads. Gabler was irritated about helping Jeanine secure an immunity idol after Sami told him about the advantage after the fact.: Immunity/Reward Challenge: Four tribe members were tethered together with ropes and navigated across several wooden obstacles, before filling a pot with water, crossing a seesaw and emptying it into a bucket, then running back and crossing again until they had emptied enough to drop a barrier. Once through, one tribe member rolled three balls up a ramp, attempting to have them land on a small ledge. The first two tribes to finish won large and small tarps respectively, while the losing tribe had to forfeit their flint.; Vesi and Baka won the challenge. Geo, Jesse, and Jeanine were sent on a journey, where they all risked their votes, and Geo won a "Knowledge is Power" advantage which allowed him to ask any castaway if they had an idol or advantage, and if they did, they would have to give it to him. Ryan claimed he threw his portion of the challenge as a way to easily eliminate Cassidy, and lied to her about her safety at the upcoming vote. Karla and James were open about voting Ryan or Geo, but also considered voting out Cassidy as she grew paranoid as the day went on. At Tribal, Karla and James voted with Cassidy to blindside Geo.
| 628 | 6 | "Mergatory" | 0.8/7 | October 26, 2022 | 5.17 |
Coco and Vesi's treemail instructed them to gather their belongings and venture to Baka's camp.: Immunity/Reward Challenge: Divided into two teams of six by random draw, team members raced to clear a sled off of sandbags and debris, before dragging it across a course collecting six large boxes, which they used to create a staircase and collect a key. Once retrieved, teams scaled up a ramp, where two members used the key to unlock puzzle pieces and solve a honeycomb word puzzle. The first team to finish won immunity at the upcoming tribal council, the merged tribe buffs and merge feast, while the losers would be vulnerable at the last pre-merge Tribal Council.; Noelle drew the odd rock and chose to back the blue team of Dwight, Gabler, Karla, Jeanine, Jesse, and Ryan. That team came back and won, granting Noelle additional immunity. The other group targeted Cody as the only non-immune Vesi member, but Gabler threw Elie under the bus for searching his bag earlier. Elie intended to work with her old Baka tribemates and the old Vesi tribemates to split the votes between Cassidy and James but told the latter she wanted to work with Coco, though James did not trust her. Gabler's targeting of Elie and her multiple deals got back to most of the tribe, and at Tribal Council, Jeanine chose to keep her idol. No other advantages were played, and Elie was blindsided before the other 12 officially made the merge.
| 629 | 7 | "Bull in a China Shop" | 0.6/5 | November 2, 2022 | 4.64 |
The merged tribe name was decided to be Gaia, which Cassidy proposed the name after her cat. Jeanine was saddened to see Elie voted out at the previous Tribal Council, but played it off as a blessing in disguise to her fellow tribemates as not to paint herself as a target. The tribe received treemail asking them to split into partners for the upcoming immunity challenge. Not wanting to cause conflict, they drew rocks to make the pairs.: Immunity Challenge: Pairs of castaways raced through a twisted cylindric rope tunnel, dug up puzzle planks and a flag, and returned to their mat. The first four pairs to finish moved on while the last two were eliminated. The remaining teams raced up a cargo net with their puzzle planks and used them to cross a bridge and raced to their mat. The first two teams to finish moved on, while the last two teams were eliminated. In the final section, the last four castaways competed individually, holding onto a rope handle attached to a bucket containing 25% of their body weight as of the beginning of the game. If the rope unspooled, the bucket would break a tile, and that castaway would be eliminated. The last standing castaway won immunity.; Gabler outlasted Cody to win immunity. Several former Baka and Vesi members suggested Ryan be voted out as a physical threat, and Noelle rallied for James to be sent home for his social prowess. Karla and Jesse were wary of Noelle calling the shots, and Cody suggested Dwight be voted out to weaken Noelle. Several tribe members found a clue to an advantage under their shelter, and James immediately retrieved it, finding it to be Knowledge is Power. Dwight informed his allies of James's potential advantage, and they swapped their advantages around to prevent them from being stolen: Cody gave his idol to Jesse, Jeanine gave her idol to Dwight, and Noelle gave her steal-a-vote advantage to Owen. At Tribal Council, the majority sided with Cody, sending Dwight home.
| 630 | 8 | "Proposterous" | 0.7/6 | November 9, 2022 | 4.73 |
As revealed in a flashback, Dwight had passed Jeanine's idol to Jesse before being blindsided, and thus Jesse had two idols in his possession as he still held Cody's idol as well. While Ryan established himself as a tribe provider, Sami surmised he would be on the bottom as the only Baka member in the majority alliance of seven, and he considered deviating from that group.: Immunity Challenge: Castaways balanced a ball on a disc by holding a pole underneath it. At regular intervals, additional sections of pole were added, making it more difficult. If their ball dropped, they would be eliminated from the challenge. The last person left standing won immunity. Before the challenge, Jeff offered the tribe four days' worth of rice if five castaways sat out of the challenge.; Cassidy, James, Jesse, Karla, and Sami sat out, and Owen outlasted Cody for immunity. Ryan consulted his tribemates on voting out Jeanine, but Sami proposed blindsiding Ryan due to his physical prowess. James was wary of flipping on Ryan so soon and wished to stay with the seven, which Cassidy disagreed with. At Tribal Council, most of the tribe stuck together to send Jeanine to the jury.
| 631 | 9 | "What About the Big Girls" | 0.7/6 | November 16, 2022 | 5.15 |
Owen was upset that James had told him to vote for Ryan even though Jeanine was voted out.: Immunity/Reward Challenge: Castaways, divided into two teams of five by random draw, held a metal brace to keep a ball in place. If they lowered the bar, the ball dropped from its perch, and that player was eliminated. The longest lasting castaway from each group won immunity, while the longest lasting castaway overall won peanut butter and jelly sandwiches for their team, along with the advantage of going to Tribal Council second.; Karla and Cody won immunity, with Cody also winning reward for his team. The blue team was exiled to Vesi's camp, where James and Owen's rivalry resulted in a heated argument at camp. Noelle sought to make a big move and told Owen and Sami that she would use her steal-a-vote against Owen, using her two votes and Sami's vote to blindside James. Sami then tried to convince Karla to vote out James as well. At Tribal Council, Noelle used her advantage and Karla joined the majority, sending James to the jury. At the red group, Cassidy and Ryan targeted each other again. Cody and Jesse brought Gabler into their alliance, and the three of them weighed the pros and cons of keeping Cassidy or Ryan. At Tribal Council, they sided with Cassidy to send Ryan to the jury.
| 632 | 10 | "Get That Money, Baby" | 0.7/6 | November 23, 2022 | 4.89 |
Noelle and Owen expressed uneasiness over Sami telling Karla about voting out James.: Reward Challenge: Castaways spun on a metal frame to drag a buoy past a marker. Then while dizzy, they traversed a net obstacle and balance beam, collecting a sandbag along the way, before attempting to land it on a disc atop a tall pole. The first castaway to finish won an overnight stay at a sanctuary, along with a feast and letters from home.; Noelle came from behind to win reward. She chose Sami, Jesse, and Owen to join her. Sami proposed voting out Cassidy next, while at camp, Cassidy tried to convince Cody and Gabler to vote out a rising threat in Noelle.: Immunity Challenge: Castaways held a handle with one hand to balance a table while using their other hand to build a house of cards high enough to reach a marker. The first castaway to complete their tower won immunity.; Cassidy won immunity. Gabler told Noelle that Cassidy had targeted her, and amidst the scrambling, Jesse worked on ensuring the votes would be split between Karla and Sami so that his alliance could pull off the blindside on Noelle. However, right before Tribal, Gabler urged Karla to take caution with the tight duo of Cody and Jesse calling the shots. At Tribal Council, most of the tribe made the move against Noelle, sending her to the jury.
| 633 | 11 | "Hiding in Plain Sight" | 0.7/6 | November 30, 2022 | 5.31 |
Karla confronted Sami about the stray votes she received at the last Tribal Council. He eventually admitted to writing her name down, and Owen rued about being on the wrong side of many of the previous votes. The next morning, a clue about an advantage in their jungle was revealed, and Cody found it to be the "Choose Your Champion" advantage, which let him bet on one of his fellow castaways to win the next immunity challenge, and if they did, he would also get immunity. He bet on Owen to win.: Immunity Challenge: Castaways hung underneath a grated steel barricade in the ocean as the tide rose. As the challenge wore on, it would give them less room to breathe, making it more difficult. If a player surfaced from the grate, they would be eliminated from the challenge. The last castaway remaining won immunity.; Karla and Owen both outlasted the high tide, and a decision was made to grant them both individual immunity, additionally granting Cody immunity through his advantage. Karla initially wanted to target Cassidy, much to the delight of Sami. Jesse and Cody wanted to vote out Sami however, feeling that a single vote against Cassidy from Karla could weaken their relationship. At Tribal Council, Sami was sent home unanimously after a failed Shot in the Dark attempt.
| 634 | 12 | "Telenovela" | 0.7/6 | December 7, 2022 | 5.34 |
Owen told Cassidy that Karla had plotted against her, leading Karla to desperately try and convince Cassidy otherwise. Jesse corroborated Owen's story, however, giving Cassidy incentive to target her old ally.: Reward Challenge: Divided into two teams of three by random draw, one castaway guided two blindfolded teammates from inside a large ball across an obstacle course. Once at the end, the guiding castaway would lead their blindfolded partners in completing a table maze. The first trio to finish won a trip to the sanctuary, which included iced coffee and pastries.; Cody, Karla, and Owen won the reward. Karla told Cody and Owen she didn't have an idol, but Cassidy told Gabler and Jesse at camp that Karla did have one, leading the men to make a final four deal.: Immunity Challenge: Castaways raced across several obstacles collecting numbered tiles, which they eventually used to open a combination lock and access a key. Once through, they then crawled under a net, and scaled up cargo meshing to the finish, where they used the key to unlock puzzle pieces and solve a hanging bat puzzle. The first castaway to finish won immunity.; Cassidy barely beat out Cody for immunity. Cody hatched a plan with Karla for both of them to say they'll play their idols but hold on to them so that Gabler or Owen would be blindsided. However, Cody revealed to them that it was a ruse so that the men could blindside Karla while she felt safe. Cody looped Jesse in on the plan, who instead considered blindsiding Cody as his fellow strategic leader. Cody asked for his idol back so that he could show Karla proof, leaving Jesse on edge over the vote. At Tribal Council, Jesse had gotten Cody's idol back and used it on Owen, leading Karla to play hers on herself; the vote revealed that Jesse had swayed Gabler and Owen into blindsiding Cody onto the jury.
| 635 | 13 | "Snap Some Necks and Cash Some Checks" | 0.8/7 | December 14, 2022 | 4.98 |
On their new island, the final five were given a word scramble which would lead them to an advantage. Karla nabbed it right before Owen could and found it was a challenge advantage.: Immunity/Reward Challenge: Castaways guided a buoy across several wooden obstacles in the ocean before arriving onshore and untying lettered blocks. They then transported the pieces using handles across a balance beam, then returned and crossed again until they had brought them all to the end, where they used the letters to unscramble an eight word phrase. The first player to finish won immunity, along with a trip to the sanctuary, which included a meal of steak, vegetables and wine.; Karla's advantage was that 10 of her blocks were already across the beam, but Owen was able to unscramble the phrase first to win his third immunity challenge. He chose Cassidy to join him, and they agreed on voting out Karla, despite Owen's apprehension about Jesse's flashy gameplay. At Tribal Council, Jesse revealed Jeanine's old idol before the vote, leading to a live tribal in which Jesse tried to convince Karla and Gabler to vote out Cassidy. However, he played the idol for himself to negate Karla's vote against him, sending Karla to the jury.: Immunity Challenge: Castaways used a pronged spear to navigate fifteen ceramic dishes through a narrow slot on a metal structure, which was attached to a spring and wobbled if disturbed. Once through the course, they would have to then stack them on top of each other, before continuing with their next dish. The first castaway to successfully stack all dishes won immunity.; Cassidy won her third immunity necklace, and Gabler & Owen both tried to convince her to let them make fire against Jesse. Jesse likewise tried to convince Cassidy that facing him in the challenge herself would boost her resume (secretly believing she would be easy to beat at fire), but Cassidy took Owen to the end leaving Gabler and Jesse to face off at the fire making challenge.: Fire Making Challenge: Gabler was the first to get flame but Jesse was right behind him. However, Jesse’s flame went out and he had to start over. Meanwhile Gabler continued to feed his fire higher and higher until it burned through the rope before Jesse’s fire ever really got started. Gabler set a record for building the fastest fire in the final four challenge and sent Jesse to the jury.; At the Final Tribal Council, Cassidy highlighted her moves of the season in eliminating several of the jury members, but James, Karla, Jesse, and Cody called her out for making those moves behind their shadows and not directing them herself. Owen was praised as an underdog for not giving up, but criticized for never having control of the strategic game. Gabler highlighted his social bonds, saying they allowed him to know what was going on among several alliances and be on the right side of the majority of the votes, as well as claiming the Elie vote as his move. The jury sided with Gabler, naming him the Sole Survivor in a 7–1–0 vote; Cassidy received James's vote to place second. During the aftershow, Gabler pledged to donate the full sum of his million-dollar prize to support veterans in need by giving it all away to a collection of veterans' support organizations with which he'd partnered.

== Voting history ==
Survivor 43 voting history
| | Original tribes | | | | | No tribes | Merged tribe | | | | | | | | | |
| Episode | 1 | 2 | 3 | 4 | 5 | 6 | 7 | 8 | 9 | | | 10 | 11 | 12 | 13 | |
|---|---|---|---|---|---|---|---|---|---|---|---|---|---|---|---|---|
| Day | 3 | 5 | 7 | 9 | 11 | 13 | 14 | 16 | 17 (Note: On Day 17, a split Tribal Council was held. The castaways were divided into two groups of five; each group went to Tribal Council separately to eliminate one castaway from each.) | | | 19 | 21 | 23 | 24 | 25 |
| Tribe | Baka | Vesi | Vesi | Coco | Coco | None | Gaia | Gaia | Gaia | | Gaia | Gaia | Gaia | Gaia | Gaia | Gaia |
| Eliminated | Morriah | Justine | Nneka | Lindsay | Geo | Elie | Dwight | Jeanine | James | | Ryan | Noelle | Sami | Cody | Karla | Jesse |
| Votes | 5–1 | 3–1–1 | 4–1 | 4–1–1 | 3–2 | 7–2–1–1 | 7–3–2 | 9–2 | 4–1 | | 4–1 | 5–2–1 | 6–0 | 4–0–0 (Note: Jesse played a hidden immunity idol on Owen and Karla played a hidden immunity idol on herself; therefore one vote against Owen and one vote against Karla were not counted.) | 4–0 (Note: Jesse played a hidden immunity idol on himself; therefore one vote against him was not counted.) | None (Note: For winning the final Immunity Challenge, Cassidy had to assign additional immunity to another player, with the remaining two competing in a fire-making challenge to determine the third finalist; she gave additional immunity to Owen, and Gabler defeated Jesse in the fire-making challenge.) |
| Voter | Vote | | | | | | | | | | | | | | | Challenge |
| Gabler | Morriah | | | | | Elie | Ryan | Jeanine | | | Ryan | Noelle | Sami | Cody | Karla | Won |
| Cassidy | | | | Lindsay | Geo | Elie | Dwight | Ryan | | | Ryan | Noelle | Sami | Cody | Karla | Immune |
| Owen | Morriah | | | | | James | Ryan | Jeanine | None (Note: This player lost their vote as another player used a vote stealer advantage.) | | | Karla | Sami | Cody | Karla | Saved |
| Jesse | | Justine | Nneka | | | None (Note: This player lost a vote attempting to gain an advantage.) | Dwight | Jeanine | | | Ryan | Noelle | Sami | Cody | Karla | Lost |
| Karla | | | | Lindsay | Geo | Owen | Dwight | Jeanine | James | | | Noelle | Sami | ~~Owen~~ | ~~Jesse~~ | |
| Cody | | Justine | Nneka | | | Elie | Dwight | Jeanine | | | Ryan | Noelle | Sami | ~~Karla~~ | | |
| Sami | Morriah | | | | | Elie | Dwight | Jeanine | James | | | Karla | None (Note: This player played the Shot in the Dark, and as a result, had to sacrifice that night's vote.) | | | |
| Noelle | | Nneka | Nneka | | | Cassidy | James | Jeanine | James | James (Note: This player used a vote stealer advantage, allowing them to steal one vote from another player and cast two ballots.) | | Sami | | | | |
| Ryan | | | | Lindsay | Cassidy | Elie | Dwight | Jeanine | | | Cassidy | | | | | |
| James | | | | Lindsay | Geo | Elie | Dwight | Jeanine | Owen | | | | | | | |
| Jeanine | Morriah | | | | | None | Ryan | Ryan | | | | | | | | |
| Dwight | | None | Nneka | | | Elie | James | | | | | | | | | |
| Elie | Morriah | | | | | James | | | | | | | | | | |
| Geo | | | | Cassidy | Cassidy | | | | | | | | | | | |
| Lindsay | | | | Geo | | | | | | | | | | | | |
| Nneka | | Justine | Noelle | | | | | | | | | | | | | |
| Justine | | Cody | | | | | | | | | | | | | | |
| Morriah | Owen | | | | | | | | | | | | | | | |

Jury vote
| Episode | 13 | | |
|---|---|---|---|
| Day | 26 | | |
| Finalist | Gabler | Cassidy | Owen |
| Votes | 7–1–0 | | |
| Juror | Vote | | |
| Jesse | Yes | | |
| Karla | Yes | | |
| Cody | Yes | | |
| Sami | Yes | | |
| Noelle | Yes | | |
| Ryan | Yes | | |
| James | | Yes | |
| Jeanine | Yes | | |

== Production ==
On March 9, 2022, CBS renewed Survivor for its forty-third and forty-fourth seasons. Like the previous two seasons, Survivor 43 was contested over 26 days, being shortened from the traditional 39 days due to the COVID-19 pandemic. CBS required all cast and production members to be fully vaccinated. Filming began in May 2022.

It was initially broadcast from September 21 to December 14, 2022, on CBS.

== Reception ==
Survivor 43 was met with mixed reception, with many praising the cast as well as the removal of panned twists present in the previous two seasons such as the "Hourglass" twist; however, winner Mike Gabler's 7–1–0 victory, as well as his intention to donate the winnings to veterans' support organizations, was seen as shocking by many. Entertainment Weekly's Dalton Ross ranked this season 25th out of 44, praising the cast and citing Gabler's victory as "certainly interesting," but criticized the season for its lack of "knock-your-socks-off" moments. Game Rant's Jillian Unrau gave the finale a rating of 3.5/5 stars, stating that Gabler's victory "felt like a blindside on the audience when he won. Unexpected twists are fun, but not when they come at the expense of wrapping up a narrative in any sort of satisfying way." Andy Dehnart of reality blurred stated that while he was glad to be surprised by Gabler's win, he also felt that Gabler was "failed" by the season's edit. In 2024, Nick Caruso of TVLine ranked this season 34th out of 47.

== Viewing figures ==
=== United States ===
Viewership and ratings per episode of Survivor 43
| No. | Title | Air date | Rating/share (18–49) | Viewers (millions) | DVR (18–49) | DVR viewers (millions) | Total (18–49) | Total viewers (millions) | Ref. |
|---|---|---|---|---|---|---|---|---|---|
| 1 | "LIVIN" | September 21, 2022 | 0.8/7 | 5.05 | 0.4 | 2.02 | 1.2 | 7.06 | |
| 2 | "Lovable Curmudgeon" | September 28, 2022 | 0.7/6 | 4.57 | 0.3 | 1.77 | 1.0 | 6.34 | |
| 3 | "I'll Sign The Divorce Papers" | October 5, 2022 | 0.8/7 | 5.15 | 0.3 | 1.55 | 1.1 | 6.70 | |
| 4 | "Show No Mercy" | October 12, 2022 | 0.7/6 | 5.03 | 0.3 | 1.64 | 1.0 | 6.67 | |
| 5 | "Stop With All the Niceness" | October 19, 2022 | 0.7/5 | 4.91 | 0.3 | 1.64 | 1.0 | 6.55 | |
| 6 | "Mergatory" | October 26, 2022 | 0.8/7 | 5.17 | 0.3 | 1.52 | 1.0 | 6.68 | |
| 7 | "Bull in a China Shop" | November 2, 2022 | 0.6/5 | 4.64 | 0.3 | 1.75 | 0.9 | 6.40 | |
| 8 | "Proposterous" | November 9, 2022 | 0.7/6 | 4.73 | 0.3 | 1.69 | 1.0 | 6.40 | |
| 9 | "What About the Big Girls" | November 16, 2022 | 0.7/6 | 5.15 | 0.3 | 1.60 | 1.0 | 6.75 | |
| 10 | "Get That Money, Baby" | November 23, 2022 | 0.7/7 | 4.89 | TBD | TBD | TBD | TBD | |
| 11 | "Hiding in Plain Sight" | November 30, 2022 | 0.7/7 | 5.31 | TBD | TBD | TBD | TBD | |
| 12 | "Telenovela" | December 7, 2022 | 0.7/6 | 5.34 | TBD | TBD | TBD | TBD | |
| 13 | "Snap Some Necks and Cash Some Checks" | December 14, 2022 | 0.8/7 | 4.98 | TBD | TBD | TBD | TBD | |
