= Survivor: Vanuatu =

- Season 9
- Region 1 DVD slipcase cover
- Presented by: Jeff Probst
- No. of days: 39
- No. of castaways: 18
- Winner: Chris Daugherty
- Runner-up: Twila Tanner
- Location: Efate, Vanuatu
- No. of episodes: 15

Release
- Original network: CBS
- Original release: September 16 – December 12, 2004

Additional information
- Filming dates: June 28 – August 5, 2004

Season chronology
- ← Previous; All-Stars Next → Palau

Survivor: Vanuatu — Islands of Fire (commonly referred to as Survivor: Vanuatu) is the ninth season of the American CBS competitive reality television series Survivor. The season was filmed from June 28, 2004, through August 5, 2004, and the season premiered on September 16, 2004. Filming took place in Vanuatu, a chain of volcanic islands in the South Pacific. Hosted by Jeff Probst, it consisted of the usual 39 days of gameplay, with 18 competitors for the second time in the series' history.

This was the second season to initially divide the tribes by gender following Survivor: The Amazon. Chris Daugherty was named the winner and Sole Survivor after defeating runner-up Twila Tanner by a jury vote of 5–2.

== Format ==
Survivor is a reality television show created by Mark Burnett and Charlie Parsons and based on the Swedish show Expedition Robinson. The series follows a number of participants who are isolated in a remote location, where they must provide food, fire, and shelter for themselves. Every three days, one participant is removed from the series by majority vote, with challenges being held to give a reward (ranging from living and food-related prizes to a car) and immunity from being voted off the show. The last remaining player is awarded a prize of $1,000,000.

== Contestants ==
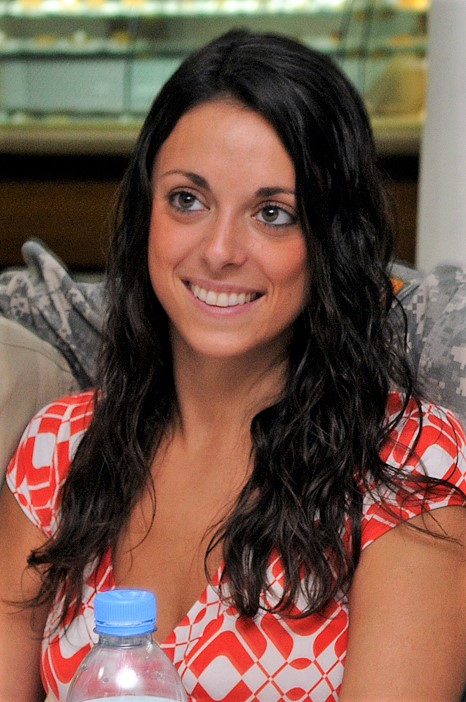
Eliza Orlins

The cast is composed of 18 new players, initially divided into two tribes by gender: the male tribe was named Lopevi, after one of Vanuatu's volcanic islands; while the female tribe was named Yasur, after Mount Yasur.

The season featured Chad Crittenden, the first amputee to play Survivor. He would be followed by Kelly Bruno in Survivor: Nicaragua and Noelle Lambert in Survivor 43. Vanuatu was also the first season of Survivor to feature two openly queer women on the same season, those being Ami Cusack and Scout Cloud Lee. It would be followed by Survivor: Micronesia, Survivor: Heroes vs. Healers vs. Hustlers, Survivor: David vs. Goliath, Survivor: Island of the Idols, Survivor 42, Survivor 43, Survivor 44, Survivor 45, and Survivor 46.

On Day 11, there was a tribal shuffle which ended up moving two people from each tribe over to the other tribe. On Day 20, the tribes were merged with ten contestants remaining; the tribe was named Alinta, a name proposed by Cloud Lee meaning "people of fire."

List of Survivor: Vanuatu – Islands of Fire contestants
Contestant	Age	From	Tribe			Finish	
Contestant	Age	From	Original	Switched	Merged	Placement	Day
Brook Geraghty	27	Winthrop, Massachusetts	Lopevi			1st voted out	Day 3
Dolly Neely	25	Lake Latonka, Pennsylvania	Yasur			2nd voted out	Day 6
John Palyok	31	Los Angeles, California	Lopevi			3rd voted out	Day 7
Mia Galeotalanza	29	Boston, Massachusetts	Yasur			4th voted out	Day 7
Brady Finta	33	Huntington Beach, California	Lopevi			5th voted out	Day 10
Travis "Bubba" Sampson	33	Johnson City, Tennessee	Lopevi	Yasur		6th voted out	Day 12
Lisa Keiffer	44	Mandeville, Louisiana	Yasur	Yasur		7th voted out	Day 15
John Kenney	22	Los Angeles, California	Lopevi	Lopevi		8th voted out	Day 18
Rory Freeman	35	Des Moines, Iowa	Lopevi	Yasur	Alinta	9th voted out	Day 21
Lea "Sarge" Masters	40	Columbia, South Carolina	Lopevi	Lopevi	Alinta	10th voted out 1st jury member	Day 24
Chad Crittenden	34	Oakland, California	Lopevi	Lopevi	Alinta	11th voted out 2nd jury member	Day 27
Leann Slaby	35	Kansasville, Wisconsin	Yasur	Yasur	Alinta	12th voted out 3rd jury member	Day 30
Ami Cusack	31	Lakewood, Colorado	Yasur	Yasur	Alinta	13th voted out 4th jury member	Day 33
Julie Berry	23	Gorham, Maine	Yasur	Lopevi	Alinta	14th voted out 5th jury member	Day 36
Eliza Orlins	21	Syracuse, New York	Yasur	Yasur	Alinta	15th voted out 6th jury member	Day 37
Scout Cloud Lee	59	Stillwater, Oklahoma	Yasur	Yasur	Alinta	16th voted out 7th jury member	Day 38
Twila Tanner	41	Marshall, Missouri	Yasur	Lopevi	Alinta	Runner-up	Day 39
Chris Daugherty	33	South Vienna, Ohio	Lopevi	Lopevi	Alinta	Sole Survivor	Day 39

=== Future appearances ===
Ami Cusack and Eliza Orlins returned for Survivor: Micronesia as members of the Favorites tribe.

Outside of Survivor, John "J.P." Palyok competed on the second season of the Fox Reality Channel reality game show Solitary. In 2006, Twila Tanner competed with Survivor: Pearl Islands castaway Jonny Fairplay on a Reality Star episode of Fear Factor. Orlins competed on The Amazing Race 31 with fellow two-time Survivor contestant Corinne Kaplan.

== Season summary ==
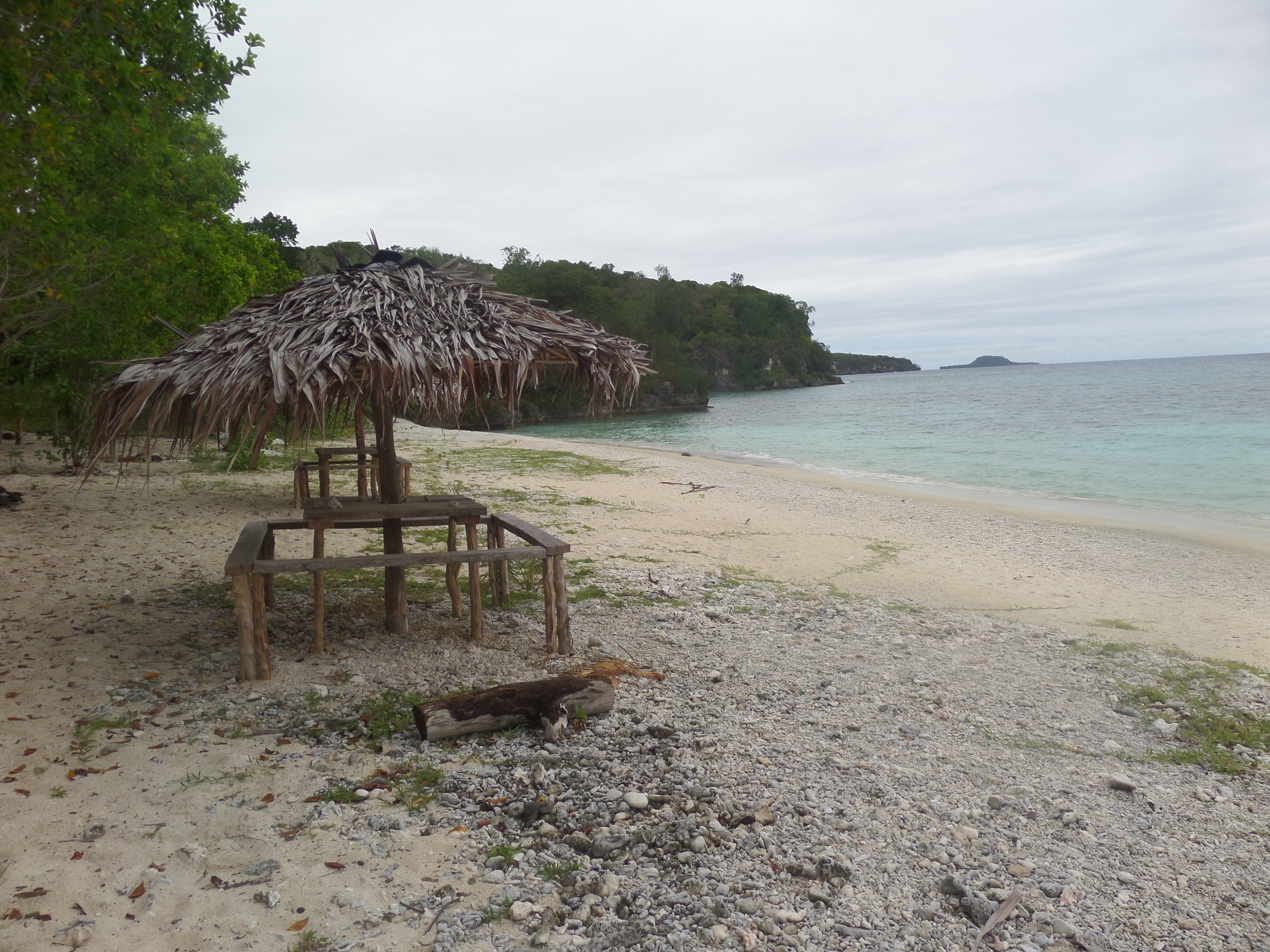
The season was filmed on the island of Efate in Vanuatu.

The eighteen players were brought into the game at a native gathering, with the natives dividing the group into men and women. The men were clearly favoured at the ceremony, creating animosity between them and the women. After the ceremony, the men were named the Lopevi tribe, and the women the Yasur tribe, and sent to find their camps in the dark. Lopevi lost the first challenge mainly due to Chris, but he created a majority alliance with older tribe members Lea, Travis, Rory, and Chad, and worked to vote off the younger men. In Yasur, two factions began to emerge, one composed of Julie, Mia, Lisa, and Eliza and the other of Ami, Twila, Scout, and Leann. While both factions lobbied for Dolly's vote, her refusal to commit resulted in her elimination. Both tribes were sent to tribal council on Day 7 as a result of a twist. The older men continued to eliminate the younger ones, and Ami's faction, now in power, voted Mia off. The Yasur tribe continued their dominance over the tribal challenges by winning the next reward and immunity challenges, bringing the men's numbers down to six.

A tribal switch occurred on day 11, mixing the two tribes; Rory and Travis were sent to Yasur while Twila and Julie were sent to Lopevi. The first Yasur loss resulted in Travis being eliminated for trying to publicly ask Lopevi to throw the immunity challenge. However, concerned over Lisa's loyalty, Ami arranged for the tribe to eliminate her at the next Tribal Council. At Lopevi, Lea, Chad, and Chris aligned with Twila and Julie, not trusting John K. as the last young man remaining. He was voted off and the five remaining Lopevi tribe members agreed to stick together after the merge.

On Day 19, with six women and four men remaining, the two tribes merged into Alinta. While Rory joined the Lopevi alliance, Julie and Twila broke their word and reformed the women's alliance. The men were quickly targeted over the next three tribal councils, leaving Chris as the sole male. By this time, Ami's core alliance consisted of her, Julie, and Leann, while Twila and Scout had formed a closer pairing and Eliza on the outside. Despite Chris losing immunity, Ami decided to spare him and vote Eliza out instead. However, Twila and Scout took the opportunity to align with Chris and Eliza, creating a new majority alliance and systematically voting out the others.

Chris won the last two immunity challenges, and ultimately took Twila with him into the final two. The jury saw Chris' ability to effectively stay in the game with the odds against him, from the first challenge to being the last man standing, and voted him the Sole Survivor in a vote of 5–2.

Challenge winners and eliminations by episode
Episode			Challenge winner(s)		Eliminated	
No.	Title	Original air date	Reward	Immunity	Tribe	Player
1	"They Came at Us with Spears!"	September 16, 2004	Yasur		Lopevi	Brook
2	"Burly Girls, Bowheads, Young Studs, and the Old Bunch"	September 23, 2004	Yasur	Lopevi	Yasur	Dolly
3	"Double Tribal, Double Trouble"	September 30, 2004	Lopevi	John K. (Lopevi) (Note: After Lopevi won the reward challenge, they competed in an individual immunity challenge, as both tribes would go to Tribal Council. John K. won immunity.)	Lopevi	John P.
3	"Double Tribal, Double Trouble"	September 30, 2004	Lopevi	Ami (Yasur) (Note: John K. had to spend a day with Yasur in order to give immunity to one of their players at Tribal Council. He chose Ami.)	Yasur	Mia
4	"Now That's a Reward!"	October 7, 2004	Yasur	Yasur	Lopevi	Brady
5	"Earthquakes and Shake-Ups!"	October 14, 2004	Lopevi	Lopevi	Yasur	Bubba
6	"Hog Tied"	October 21, 2004	Lopevi	Lopevi	Yasur	Lisa
7	"Anger, Threats, Tears...and Coffee"	October 28, 2004	Yasur	Yasur	Lopevi	John K.
8	"Now the Battle Really Begins"	November 4, 2004	Lopevi	Sarge	Alinta	Rory
9	"Gender Wars...It's Getting Ugly"	November 11, 2004	Leann [Julie]	Ami	Alinta	Sarge
10	"Culture Shock and Violent Storms"	November 18, 2004	Ami, Chad, Chris, Eliza	Twila	Alinta	Chad
11	"Surprise and...Surprise Again!"	November 25, 2004	Eliza	Ami	Alinta	Leann
12	"Now Who's in Charge Here?!"	December 2, 2004	Eliza, Ami, Chris (Note: When Eliza won the reward challenge, she received a new car and a spa retreat, and the players who finished second and third in the challenge were able to join her at the retreat.)	Chris	Alinta	Ami
13	"Eruption of Volcanic Magnitude"	December 9, 2004	Julie [Chris]	Eliza	Alinta	Julie
14	"Spirits and the Final Four"	December 12, 2004	None	Chris	Alinta	Eliza
14	"Spirits and the Final Four"	December 12, 2004	None	Chris	Alinta	Scout
15	"The Reunion"	December 12, 2004			Alinta	

In the case of multiple tribes or castaways who win reward or immunity, they are listed in order of finish, or alphabetically where it was a team effort; where one castaway won and invited others, the invitees are in brackets.

== Episodes ==
No. overall	No. in season	Title	CBS recap	Original release date	U.S. viewers (millions)	Rating/share (18–49)
123	1	"They Came at Us with Spears"	Recap	September 16, 2004	20.06	7.8/22
After being divided into two tribes separated by gender, with the men and women in the Lopevi and Yasur tribes respectively, and witnessing a Vanuatuan ceremony, the tribes headed their separate ways through the dark night in order to find their respective camps. As the Yasur tribe negotiated the dangerous rocky beach path, factions quickly developed. At the Lopevi camp, Chad stunned his tribemates by revealing his prosthetic foot, which he received as a result of a battle with cancer.: Reward/Immunity Challenge: The castaways would compete for both immunity and reward by going through an obstacle course. Each castaway would go beneath a mud crawl and solve a box maze. Following the box maze, they would then cross over a very narrow balance beam to light a fire in order to drop a torch. The torch would be needed to light a final wok, which would signify victory. The winning tribe receives tribal immunity and flint.; At the combined Reward and Immunity Challenge, the men made quick work of the puzzle maze and took their lead to the balance beam, where they struggled to cross it one by one. The men maintained their lead until Chris simply could not cross the balance beam. Taking advantage of this, the Yasur tribe took the lead and received immunity. After returning to camp from the crushing defeat, most of the Lopevi members deemed it a foregone conclusion that Chris would be the first one voted off because of his balance beam failure. Chris, however, built an alliance on the fly with some of the older members of Lopevi to get rid of the younger members of the tribe. At Tribal Council, the older member's alliance held strong and Brook was voted out.
124	2	"Burly Girls, Bowheads, Young Studs, and the Old Bunch"	Recap	September 23, 2004	19.14	7.5/22
As the tribes convened for the Reward Challenge, Jeff explained that the challenge would involve balance and teamwork, and that if Lopevi were to win, they would secure flint for their tribe.: Reward Challenge: Eight castaways from each tribe would stand on a narrow beam over water. One at a time, the castaways would move down the beam, squeezing past their fellow tribe members. The castaway moving down the beam would not be allowed to touch more than one tribe member at a time. Any castaway to fall off would have to start over. The first tribe to get all eight members to the finish platform would win pillows, blankets, and a hammock.; During the challenge, the women of Yasur made easy work of the competition and finished well ahead of Lopevi, winning the reward of comfort. Alliances were still forming at Yasur; the tribe was split by age with the younger and older alliances. After learning that she had been a target, Twila formed an alliance with Dolly.: Immunity Challenge: The tribes would be required to assemble a series of platforms to an observation deck. Each platform would be made from puzzle pieces. Blindfolded, the castaways would need to retrieve these puzzle pieces from the land and sea with the aid of a fellow tribe member who would not be blindfolded. Once all the pieces are gathered, the tribe would then remove their blindfolds in order to put together their platform puzzles. The first tribe to piece together the puzzle pieces would win immunity.; When the tribes started the Immunity Challenge, chaos began as the blindfolded castaways bumped into each other. Lopevi took the lead, while the Yasur women were in disarray when Scout mistakenly overlooked the final puzzle piece in the water. Lopevi made quick work of the rest of the puzzles, and they secured flint as well as Tribal Immunity. After experiencing their first defeat and returning to their camp, the Yasur women vacillated between Eliza or Leann. At Tribal Council, Dolly found herself to be the swing vote; she, however, was perceived as a threat to the rest of her tribe, and got voted out.
125	3	"Double Tribal, Double Trouble"	Recap	September 30, 2004	19.91	7.5/21
Personalities clashed at both tribes. At Lopevi, Lea questioned Rory's work ethic. At Yasur, Mia expressed her dislike for Twila. Julie, Lisa, and Mia got concerned that Eliza may have changed her vote. At the reward challenge, Jeff announced that both tribes would go to Tribal Council, and that the winning tribe would compete for individual immunity.: Reward Challenge: The tribe members must work together to escape a set of three locked cages. To make their way through, they must untie planks, use grappling hooks to retrieve keys, and master a series of interlocking siderails. First tribe to escape the cages wins reward, and will go on to compete in the individual immunity challenge. The winning tribe receives fishing gear.; Lopevi had an early lead, but they lost one of their grappling hooks, allowing Yasur to pull ahead. However, Lopevi managed to pull ahead once Yasur had trouble obtaining their final key. Lopevi won reward, as well as a chance to compete for immunity individually.: Individual Immunity Challenge: The castaways must dig seven ladder rungs out of the sand in order to assemble a puzzle-like ladder. Once the ladder is built, the castaways must climb to the top. First castaway to climb to the top wins Individual Immunity. In addition, the winning castaway would be able to grant immunity to a castaway on the opposing tribe.; At the immunity challenge, it came down to Chad and John K. Chad came up first with all seven rungs, however he had trouble assembling the puzzle-like ladder, allowing John K. to pull ahead and win immunity. At Yasur, Eliza lobbied to vote out Scout, however Mia lobbied to vote out her nemesis, Twila. At Lopevi, Brady argued to Lea that the alliance of older men should be broken up to vote out Rory, who didn't get along with many of his tribemates. Chris had to talk to Lea and convince him to stay loyal. In the end, Lopevi's alliance of older men held strong, and sent John P. home. At Yasur's Tribal Council, John K. granted Ami immunity as he knew she would probably be safe anyway. The alliance of younger women was broken when Lisa flipped, voting Mia out.
126	4	"Now That's a Reward!"	Recap	October 7, 2004	19.46	7.3/21
After Lisa flipped alliances at the previous Tribal Council, tensions arose at Yasur and the women were unsure whom to trust. The older men of Lopevi were happy to see that they were succeeding in voting out the younger men. Knowing he was on the chopping block, the younger Brady attempted to become Lopevi's provider of fish, however he brought back only a small catch.: Reward Challenge: Pairs of several Vanuatu cultural items were hidden in a group of baskets. The castaways must take turns finding matching pairs in the field of baskets. First tribe to find five pairs wins a Vanuatu tribesman named Dah's visit to the winning tribe's camp to teach them about fishing, hunting and shelter.; With the help of Ami, Eliza, Julie, and Leann, Yasur took an early lead at the reward challenge and eventually won. When the Vanuatu tribesman, Dah, arrived at the Yasur camp, he taught the tribe how to retrieve coconuts for milk and showed them roots, nuts, and sugarcane. The Yasur women felt that Dah's visit boosted their team morale. At Lopevi, Travis became homesick and the feud between Lea and Rory intensified.: Immunity Challenge: The tribe members must race to match a series of colored tiles according to the symbol painted on them. Each tribe must designate a member to be their "eyes". The "eyes" will stand on a perch to guide their tribe as they arrange their tiles in a grid so that no color or symbol is repeated in one row or column. First tribe to decipher the puzzle wins immunity.; At the immunity challenge, Lopevi selected Rory to be their "eyes" and Yasur selected Eliza for theirs. Yasur managed to secure another victory. Knowing they were on the chopping block, Brady and John K. lobbied the older men's alliance to keep them around in order to win challenges. In the end, loyalty outweighed strength, and Brady was unanimously sent home.
127	5	"Earthquakes and Shake-Ups!"	Recap	October 14, 2004	19.16	7.0/19
After a cold night, there was a conflict at Lopevi over who gets to sleep near the fire. Travis, who always slept near the fire, refused to consider a rotation of sleeping positions that will give all Lopevi members a chance to sleep near the fire. As morning came, both tribes were shocked to see Vanuatu tribesmen approach their shore, instructing them to choose a "chief". Lopevi chose Lea while Yasur chose Scout. As the tribes speculated about the role of being the chief, both tribes were shaken up by an earthquake. As the tribes gathered for a reward challenge, Jeff announced that the tribes would be switched. The two chiefs, Lea and Scout, would be the leaders of the new tribes. Scout had to assign the castaways to each tribe, while Lea would get to choose which tribe he would lead. After the tribes were switched, the new Lopevi tribe was Chad, Chris, John K., Julie, and Twila with Lea as their leader. The new Yasur tribe was Ami, Eliza, Leann, Lisa, Rory, and Travis with Scout as the leader.: Reward Challenge: The castaways must pull themselves along an underwater rope, retrieving markers along the way. The tribe the collects the most markers in the time given wins a trip to the waterfalls of Vanuatu, plus beer and Pringles chips.; At the reward challenge, the new Lopevi tribe fell behind as Chris lost his marker. However, they managed to pull ahead when Ami from Yasur was unable to dive that deep and returned empty-handed. Chris found the marker, and came back from underwater, winning reward for Lopevi. As they enjoyed their reward, the new Lopevi tribe bonded over their beer and Pringles. The women at Yasur welcomed new arrivals Rory and Travis. As Jeff was explaining the immunity challenge, Ami caught Travis trying to communicate something to Chris, who was now on the opposing tribe.: Immunity Challenge: The tribes must race through the jungle to retrieve paddles and parts of a canoe. Once all the pieces are gathered, the tribes must assemble their canoe and paddle out in the ocean to retrieve their flag. First tribe to bring their flag to the shore wins immunity.; During the challenge, Yasur fell behind when Rory had trouble untying a knot to release a paddle. Lopevi ended up winning immunity. As the only men on Yasur, Rory and Travis were on the chopping block, however Eliza argued that they could go on a losing streak without the men. Despite Eliza's arguments, Travis was not trusted due to his attempt to communicate with Chris during the challenge, and he was voted out.
128	6	"Hog Tied"	Recap	October 21, 2004	19.22	7.3/20
Rory was upset that the only other Yasur male, Travis, was voted out. At Lopevi, Julie and Twila made predictions of who Yasur voted out. After receiving Tree Mail, the Yasur tribe gathered to hear a speech from Rory about fairness.: Reward Challenge: The tribe members must race through a muddy pigpen in order to retrieve tribe-colored pigs. First tribe to bring ten pigs back to their tribe pen wins steak and eggs.; At the reward challenge, Lea placed the final pig into the pen, winning reward for Lopevi. While Lopevi enjoyed their steaks, the Yasur tribe discussed Eliza's poor performance in the reward challenge. At Lopevi, Lea and Twila discussed their alliances. Without Rory and Travis, the older men welcomed Twila into their alliance.: Immunity Challenge: From a platform in the water, each tribe member must navigate obstacle course to retrieve a pieces of a tiki. The castaways must avoid both above and underwater obstacles. The tribes must then bring the pieces ashore to assemble their tiki. First tribe to assemble their tiki correctly wins immunity.; At the immunity challenge, Ami and Chris collapsed on the beach. Rory gave Yasur a lead, however Leann had trouble underwater, allowing Lopevi to win immunity once again. After Yasur lost immunity, Leann blamed herself for the loss of the challenge. Eliza, Leann and Rory were on the chopping block. However, Ami decided that Lisa couldn't be trusted and convinced Eliza, Leann, and Rory to vote for Lisa. In the end, Ami's plan came to fruition, and Lisa was sent home.
129	7	"Anger, Threats, Tears...and Coffee"	Recap	October 28, 2004	20.24	7.6/20
At Lopevi, John K. decided to slack off from work, which irritated some of his tribemates. At Yasur, since being the only man left, Rory was feeling vulnerable.: Reward Challenge: One tribe member at a time must open coconuts, then they must race through an obstacle course with the coconut juice, and fill up their tribe's receiving jar. Once the jar is full, the final tribe member must carry it to the finish line. First tribe to get their full jar across the finish line wins a trip to a café to enjoy coffee, juice, treats, and love from home.; At the reward challenge, Leann almost lost the challenge for Yasur when she tripped. However, she managed to bring the full jar across the finish line, winning reward for Yasur. At the café the Yasur tribe enjoyed their treats and tearfully read letters from home.: Immunity Challenge: The tribe members must take turns using a slingshot to fire marbles at tiles. First tribe to break all twenty of their tiles wins immunity.; At the immunity challenge, Rory hit his tribe's final tile, winning immunity for Yasur. After returning to camp, the men of Lopevi worried that keeping the women around could be fatal mistake, as they could easily pick off the men one by one with a 6–4 advantage. Knowing that he was on the chopping block, John K. lobbied Chris and Twila to vote out Chad because of his position as a sympathy threat. In the end, the alliance of older men stuck to their original plan, and John K. was sent home.
130	8	"Now the Battle Really Begins"	Recap	November 4, 2004	20.70	7.8/
Knowing she would probably be next on the chopping block, Julie flirted with Lea. At Yasur, Rory and Scout seemed to be doing most of the work. Being the only man on Yasur, Rory's patience was dwindling.: Reward Challenge: One tribe member must race into the ocean to fill a bucket with water. Then they must bring it back and toss it to a tribemate. The bucket must be tossed twice more, and the final tribe member must catch the water itself in another bucket, and use it to fill a jar. The tribes must repeat this until they have enough weight in their jar to lower it to the ground, sending a lit flame up to a fire tower. First tribe to light their fire wins cookies, milk, and chocolate cake.; At the reward challenge, both tribes had trouble getting the water into their final castaway's bucket. However, Chris managed to catch water more easily by getting low to the ground, allowing Lopevi to take the lead and win reward. While enjoying their reward, Chris formed an alliance with Chad. As the tribes gathered for the immunity challenge, Jeff shocked the castaways when he announced the merge, and explained that they would be playing for individual immunity.: Immunity Challenge: The castaways were divided into two groups. The castaways must race to a series of tall wooden towers in the water and climb to the top. Then they must navigate across a balance beam, retrieve a flag, and jump off the tower and race to the beach. First two players from each group to bring three flags to the beach moves on to the final round. The final round would be the same challenge. First person to collect all three of their flags wins immunity.; Immunity was won by Lea. As the castaways returned to the old Lopevi camp, they were excited to enjoy their merge feast. They chose to name the new tribe "Alinta", which means "people of the fire". Lea got nervous when he saw how close Ami and Julie were, which threatened his Lopevi alliance. With the Lopevi men's alliance and the Yasur women's alliance, Julie and Twila were the swing votes. They could either vote with their former Lopevi tribemates, or vote with the other women to eliminate the men, starting with Rory. In the end, Julie and Twila stuck with the other women, and voted out Rory.
131	9	"Gender Wars...It's Getting Ugly"	Recap	November 11, 2004	20.14	7.4/
After Julie and Twila broke their alliance with the Lopevi men, it became clear that a gender war was taking place. Being the leader amongst the men, Lea became worried.: Reward Challenge: Each castaway is assigned three skulls. The castaways must take turns answering questions about Vanuatu history and culture. Each time a castaway answers a question correctly, they must set another player's skull on fire. The person with the last skull left wins a helicopter ride to the inland gorge of Vanuatu. They will enjoy a picnic of chicken wings and champagne in the mouth of an inactive volcano.; At the reward challenge, all three men were quickly eliminated as the women burned all of their skulls. Leann won reward, and chose Julie to join her. As Julie and Leann enjoyed their picnic, they formed a final two alliance. Back at camp, the men tried to figure out how to break the female alliance. They decided to take advantage of the rift between Eliza and Scout, and use that to convince the women that Eliza should be voted out.: Immunity Challenge: Each castaway must stand behind a podium containing a mosaic puzzle. Each piece of the mosaic puzzle has multiple sides, with each side a different color. The castaways would then be shown a picture showing a mosaic with a specific color scheme. The castaways will have one minute to replicate what they saw on their picture, with those making a mistake eliminated from the challenge. The puzzles will gradually become more difficult and the castaways will have less time. Last castaway standing wins immunity.; At the immunity challenge, the first puzzle eliminated all three men. In the end, it came down to Ami, Julie, and Leann. Immunity was won by Ami. After returning to camp, the men continued to try and break the women's alliance. Lea convinced Twila that she was lied to by Julie and not by the Lopevi alliance. Chad suddenly realized that instead of their stupid plan to have Eliza voted out, the men should try and convince her to abandon the women's alliance that didn't really like her and join forces with them. In the end, however, the women stuck together, and Lea was voted out, becoming the first member of the jury.
132	10	"Culture Shock and Violent Storms"	Recap	November 18, 2004	20.70	7.7/
As morning rose, Scout formed an alliance with Chad and Chris. Her plan was to eliminate Eliza, then Ami.: Reward Challenge: The castaways will be split into two teams of four. One player from each team will be deemed the "sacrificial lamb". The "sacrificial lamb" must wear a harness with their hands tied. The other three team members must guide the "sacrificial lamb" through an obstacle course. First team to get their "sacrificial lamb" to the finish line wins a trip to another island, where a Vanuatu village will host a night of ritual, spiritual union, and food.; The team of Ami, Chad, Chris, and Eliza won reward. Back at camp, Scout revealed her plan to eliminate Eliza before the men. Leann had doubts, however Julie and Twila considered it. After the winning team returned to camp, Scout clarified her plan to the men.: Immunity Challenge: The castaways must hang onto a pole as long as they can. The last person left hanging without touching the ground wins immunity.; At the immunity challenge, it came down to Chad and Twila. Twila outlasted Chad, winning immunity. After returning to camp, Scout immediately lobbied to have Eliza eliminated before the men. However, Ami still wanted to stick with their original plan. Twila ended up being the swing vote. She could vote for Eliza, with Chad, Chris and Scout and cause a tie between Chad and Eliza, or vote for Chad with Ami, Eliza, Julie and Leann, sending Chad home. However, the women ended up sticking to their original plan, and Chad was voted out, becoming the second member of the jury.
133	11	"Surprise and...Surprise Again!"	Recap	November 25, 2004	16.48	6.0/
Knowing he was on the chopping block, Chris, the last man left, attempted to break the female alliance. He told the women that Scout and Twila had conspired to align with Chad and Chris. As the castaways gathered for the reward challenge, Jeff shocked the castaways by announcing that the winner would get to communicate with their loved one for one hour using a computer satellite hook-up. The castaways were given a one-minute taste of the contact before the challenge started.: Reward Challenge: The challenge would be a memory test about what has played out in the previous challenges of this season. The castaways will be asked a series of questions. The player who answers the most questions correctly wins reward. The winner's loved one will spend a night at the Alinta camp; The challenge came down to Eliza and Julie. Eliza ended up winning reward. Jeff shocked Eliza by telling her that she would actually spend a whole night with her mother. Jeff invited the loved ones for a tearful reunion with the castaways. While Eliza spent time with her mother, Ami and Leann asked Scout and Twila where their loyalties lay. They both assured Ami and Leann that they were sticking to their original plan. However, Leann revealed that she had since promised Julie a spot in the Final Four, meaning that the original plan (Leann, Ami, Scout, and Twila in the Final Four) was no longer applicable. As the castaways gathered for the immunity challenge, Jeff shocked the castaways by announcing that the loved ones would participate in the challenge.: Immunity Challenge: Both the castaways and the loved ones will participate in the challenge. The castaways must sit on towers and verbally guide their blindfolded loved ones through a series of obstacles in order to retrieve bags of puzzle pieces. Once all the bags are retrieved, the castaways and their loved one must work together to assemble the puzzle. First castaway to complete the puzzle wins immunity. This challenge was originally used in Survivor: Thailand.; It came down to Ami and her girlfriend, and Chris and his fiancée. Ami and her girlfriend completed the puzzle before Chris and his fiancée, and Chris sadly told her his fate in the game was sealed. After returning to camp, the women discussed who they would vote out next. Julie and Leeann decided that Eliza didn't deserve to stay in the game any longer, which Ami then signed off on. However, Julie told Chris about Eliza's looming vote-out, and then Chris brought the information to Twila. Twila told Chris that he's been spared and he could turn the game around by talking to one person; after some back and forth, Chris realized she meant Eliza, and he went to Eliza and pleaded with her to take the chance and side with him, Scout and Twila against her former allies, which was hard for Eliza due to her dislike of Scout and Twila. Scout and Twila formed an alliance with Chris and Eliza and targeted Leann, since Ami had immunity. In the end, the new alliance of four's plan came into fruition, and Leann was voted out, becoming the third member of the jury.
134	12	"Now Who's in Charge Here?!"	Recap	December 2, 2004	19.72	7.3/
After returning from Tribal Council in which Leann was voted out, Ami was furious at Twila for betraying her, but Twila bluntly told Ami she'd paid the price for being cocky and making it clear who was NOT in her Final 3 and Final 4 alliances. As the castaways gathered for the reward challenge, Jeff drove up in a brand new Pontiac G6, and explained that the winner would win the car.: Reward Challenge: The castaways must race across a floating obstacle course in order to retrieve flags. First person to bring three flags back to shore wins a brand new Pontiac G6. The second and third placed castaways would join the winner on a road trip to a resort, where they will enjoy a night with food and a hot shower.; It came down to Ami and Eliza as they both got their three flags. However, as they were running up to place their flags in their posts, Ami fell in the water, allowing Eliza to win the car. Being in second and third place, Ami and Chris joined Eliza on the road trip, with Chris making a critical move to outrun Julie for the reward share so that she and Ami wouldn't have their former alliance-mate/recent vote target Eliza alone to possibly re-recruit. At the reward, Ami apologized to Eliza for voting for her at the previous Tribal Council, but annoyed Eliza by claiming (falsely) that Ami and her alliance had repeatedly saved Eliza from being voted out in the past. Back at camp, Twila got worried that Ami would use the reward time to recruit Eliza into her alliance. At the reward, Ami lobbied Chris and Eliza to break their alliance with Scout and Twila. Chris explained to Eliza that strategically, it would be better to stick with Scout and Twila. Meanwhile, Ami urged Eliza to consider how many times Ami had saved her from being eliminated. Eliza thought it would be hard to write down Ami's name.: Immunity Challenge: The challenge was a version of shuffleboard. Each castaway will be given six metal discs. On the board there will be a map of the Vanuatu islands. The castaways must try to get their discs on the islands. However, the castaways may use their discs to knock the other castaways' discs off the islands. The only way to keep a disc safe on an island is to drop it into a volcano on the board. The castaway with the most discs on the islands wins immunity.; At the immunity challenge, it came down to Ami and Chris. Ami hit one of her own discs off an island, reducing her score by one, giving Chris immunity. After returning to camp, Ami and Julie knew they were on the chopping block. Chris, Scout and Twila got worried that Eliza would flip to Ami's side. In the end, Eliza stuck to her alliance with Twila, Chris, and Scout, and Ami was voted out, becoming the fourth member of the jury.
135	13	"Eruption of Volcanic Magnitude"	Recap	December 9, 2004	20.30	7.6/
After Eliza reminded Twila of a previous broken promise at Tribal Council, Twila got furious at Eliza and her tribe. Julie took advantage of the rift between Eliza and Twila and lobbied to vote out Twila next. Eliza told her that she would consider it if Chris was on board.: Reward Challenge: This challenge incorporated elements from previous challenges this season. First the castaways must navigate through a mud crawl, with the last to complete the crawl being eliminated from the challenge. Then the four remaining castaways must catch a pig to bring it into their pen, with the last one to do so being eliminated from the challenge. Then the three remaining castaways must solve a tiki puzzle, with two moving on. The final two castaways must race across a balance beam, then use a slingshot to break three tiles. First castaway to break three tiles wins a trip to Mount Yasur where the winner will enjoy a picnic of hot dogs, hot chocolate, and beer.; At the reward challenge, it came down to Julie and Twila. Julie ended up winning reward, and chose Chris to join her hoping that she could convince him to eliminate Twila. At the reward, Julie told Chris that Eliza had put the decision about whether or not they were going to break their alliance with Scout and Twila in his hands. After Chris and Julie returned to camp, Chris assured Scout and Twila that he was still on board with them.: Immunity Challenge: Jeff will start by telling the story of Roy Mata. After he finishes the story, the castaways must race to different stations to answer questions about the story. Each time a castaway answers correctly, they would receive a white pig tusk, which they must attach to a necklace. First player to attach all five of their tusks to the necklace wins immunity.; Immunity was won by Eliza. After returning from the challenge, Chris knew he was the swing vote. Chris could vote with Scout and Twila to eliminate Julie, or he could vote with Eliza and Julie to eliminate Twila. He told both Julie and Twila that he needed to vote the other off. In the end, Chris voted with Scout and Twila, and Julie was voted out. Julie became the fifth member of the jury.
136	14	"Spirits and the Final Four"	Recap	December 16, 2004	19.72	7.5/16
After returning from Tribal Council, Eliza was angry at some of the things said about her.: Immunity Challenge: The castaways must race through an eight-level vertical maze in order to retrieve ten colored tiles. Once they have all their tiles, they must untie the tiles to reveal letters for a word scramble. First castaway to form the correct two-word phrase wins immunity.; At the immunity challenge, Chris spelled out the winning phrase, "Final Three", correctly, winning immunity. After he won immunity, Chris celebrated with Scout and Twila. Chris tried to get Twila to give Eliza a hard time before Tribal Council, however Twila realized that he was trying to get more jury votes should they make it to the final two. In the end Chris voted with Twila and Scout, eliminating Eliza by a 3–1 vote, who became the sixth member of the jury. The final three were awakened early by Jeff, who instructed them to paddle to chief Roy Mata's resting place to pay their respects to the fallen castaways. The final three passed all the torches and reminisced about the 38 days they had spent at Vanuatu.: Immunity Challenge: The castaways must stand on platform holding a bow and arrow in a warrior pose. Any castaway who falls off the platform or releases their arrow will be eliminated from the challenge. The last castaway remaining would win immunity.; At the final immunity challenge, Scout fell out first. After an hour, Twila lost balance, giving Chris immunity once again. After winning the final immunity challenge, Chris thought about whom to take to the final two. He felt that Twila was not as well liked as Scout, therefore he felt he could beat Twila more easily. In the end, Chris voted out Scout, who he felt was more liked by the jury. Scout became the seventh and final member of the jury. At the final Tribal Council, Chris defended his actions as part of the game and said that he often didn't know who he was going to vote for until he was in the booth. Twila apologized for swearing on her son's name, and said that she worked hard and did what she needed to stay true to herself. Twila received Ami and Scout's votes, while Chris received votes from Lea, Julie, Eliza, Chad and Leann.
137	15	"Reunion"	N/A	December 23, 2004	15.23	6.5/
Months later, Chris won the game and becoming Sole Survivor beat Twila by 5–2 votes. The castaways return to discuss the season with host, Jeff Probst.

== Voting history ==
	Original tribes					Switched tribes			Merged tribe							
Episode	1	2	3		4	5	6	7	8	9	10	11	12	13	14	
Day	3	6	7		10	12	15	18	21	24	27	30	33	36	37	38
Tribe	Lopevi	Yasur	Lopevi	Yasur	Lopevi	Yasur	Yasur	Lopevi	Alinta	Alinta	Alinta	Alinta	Alinta	Alinta	Alinta	Alinta
Eliminated	Brook	Dolly	John P.	Mia	Brady	Bubba	Lisa	John K.	Rory	Sarge	Chad	Leann	Ami	Julie	Eliza	Scout
Votes	5–3–1	5–4	5–3	5–3	6–1	6–1	4–2	5–1	6–4	7–1–1	6–2	4–3	4–2	3–2	3–1	1–0
Voter	Vote															
Chris	Brook		John P.		Brady			John K.	Ami	Sarge	Eliza	Leann	Ami	Julie	Eliza	Scout
Twila		Dolly		Mia				John K.	Rory	Sarge	Chad	Leann	Ami	Julie	Eliza	None (Note: Scout and Twila were not eligible to vote as the only eligible players they could vote for were each other.)
Scout		Dolly		Mia		Bubba	Rory		Rory	Sarge	Chad	Leann	Ami	Julie	Eliza	None
Eliza		Dolly		Twila		Bubba	Lisa		Rory	Sarge	Chad	Leann	Ami	Twila	Twila	
Julie		Leann		Twila				John K.	Rory	Sarge	Chad	Eliza	Scout	Twila		
Ami		Dolly		Mia		Bubba	Lisa		Rory	Sarge	Chad	Eliza	Scout			
Leann		Dolly		Mia		Bubba	Lisa		Rory	Sarge	Chad	Eliza				
Chad	Brook		John P.		Brady			John K.	Ami	Julie	Eliza					
Sarge	Brook		John P.		Brady			John K.	Ami	Eliza						
Rory	Brook		John P.		Brady	Bubba	Lisa		Ami							
John K.	Chris		Rory		Brady			Chad								
Lisa		Leann		Mia		Bubba	Rory									
Bubba	Brook		John P.		Brady	Rory										
Brady	Rory		Rory		Rory											
Mia		Leann		Twila												
John P.	Chris		Rory													
Dolly		Leann														
Brook	Chris															

Jury vote
Episode	15	
Day	39	
Finalist	Chris	Twila
Vote	5–2	
Juror	Vote	
Scout		Yes
Eliza	Yes	
Julie	Yes	
Ami		Yes
Leann	Yes	
Chad	Yes	
Sarge	Yes	

== Reception ==
The season has generally been negatively received, with the primary criticism being the repetition of the "battle of the sexes" theme, and how the theme arguably did not work as well in this season as it did in Survivor: The Amazon. Host Jeff Probst, ranking it as the 5th-worst season in 2010, admittedly felt that he "liked this season more than the audience did, and that has probably influenced why it has dropped since my last ranking." Tom Santilli of Examiner.com ranked it among the bottom 10 at #21, while Dalton Ross of Entertainment Weekly ranked it the seventh-worst season of the series, only better than San Juan del Sur, One World, Thailand, Fiji, Nicaragua and Island of the Idols, saying that although "the battle of the sexes worked well the first time around," he felt it wasn't as strong in this season. In 2020, it was ranked 31st out of 40 by Survivor fan site "The Purple Rock Podcast", saying that "the casting was below average on this season," and since "the gimmick/twist for this season was one the show had used before…the issue here is whether you like that narrative." Andrea Deiher of Zap2it ranked it as the 3rd-worst season, saying that "we can barely remember anyone from this season…this was just kind of a dud season." In 2015, a poll by Rob Has a Podcast ranked Vanuatu 17th out of 30 with Rob Cesternino ranking this season 19th. This was updated in 2021 during Cesternino's podcast, Survivor All-Time Top 40 Rankings, ranking 23rd out of 40. In 2020, Inside Survivor ranked this season 22nd out of 40 saying that while "there are a few casting duds on Vanuatu, and the early merge suffers from a predictable Pagonging against the men, there's still a lot to love in this season thanks to its characters, unexpected moments, and a fantastic endgame." In 2024, Nick Caruso of TVLine ranked this season 31st out of 47. Part of the show's mixed-to-negative legacy has been defined by how different observers feel about the season's winner, Chris Daugherty. Jeff Probst has stated that Chris was a liar and a bad winner, a sentiment that many fans speculate stemmed from his post game relationship with Julie Berry, who Chris voted off. While many fans liked Chris and were happy when he won, his status as a one time contestant, paired with Probst's blatant dislike for him, has made his legacy more faded than other winners, many of whom have returned for at least one season.
