= Survivor: Nicaragua =

- Season 21
- Region 1 DVD cover
- Presented by: Jeff Probst
- No. of days: 39
- No. of castaways: 20
- Winner: Jud "Fabio" Birza
- Runner-up: Chase Rice
- Location: San Juan del Sur, Nicaragua
- Sprint Player of the Season: Jane Bright
- No. of episodes: 16

Release
- Original network: CBS
- Original release: September 15 – December 19, 2010

Additional information
- Filming dates: June 14 – July 22, 2010

Season chronology
- ← Previous; Heroes vs. Villains Next → Redemption Island

Survivor: Nicaragua is the 21st season of the American CBS competitive reality television series Survivor. It premiered on September 15, 2010, at 8:00pm, moving to the Wednesday timeslot for the first time since Survivor: Borneo.

Jud "Fabio" Birza was named the winner in the final episode on December 19, 2010, defeating Chase Rice and Matthew "Sash" Lenahan in a 5–4–0 vote. Birza became the youngest person to ever win the game, at age 21 years and 6 months, a record previously held by 22-year-old Jenna Morasca from Survivor: The Amazon. This was the first Survivor season to have an all-male final three. Jane Bright won $100,000 as the "Sprint Player of the Season."

== Format ==
Survivor is a reality television show based on the Swedish show Expedition Robinson, created by Mark Burnett and Charlie Parsons. The series follows a number of participants isolated in a remote location, where they must provide food, fire, and shelter. One participant is removed from the series by majority vote every three days, with challenges held to give a reward (ranging from living- and food-related prizes to a car) and immunity from being voted out of the series. The last remaining player receives a prize of $1,000,000.

== Contestants ==
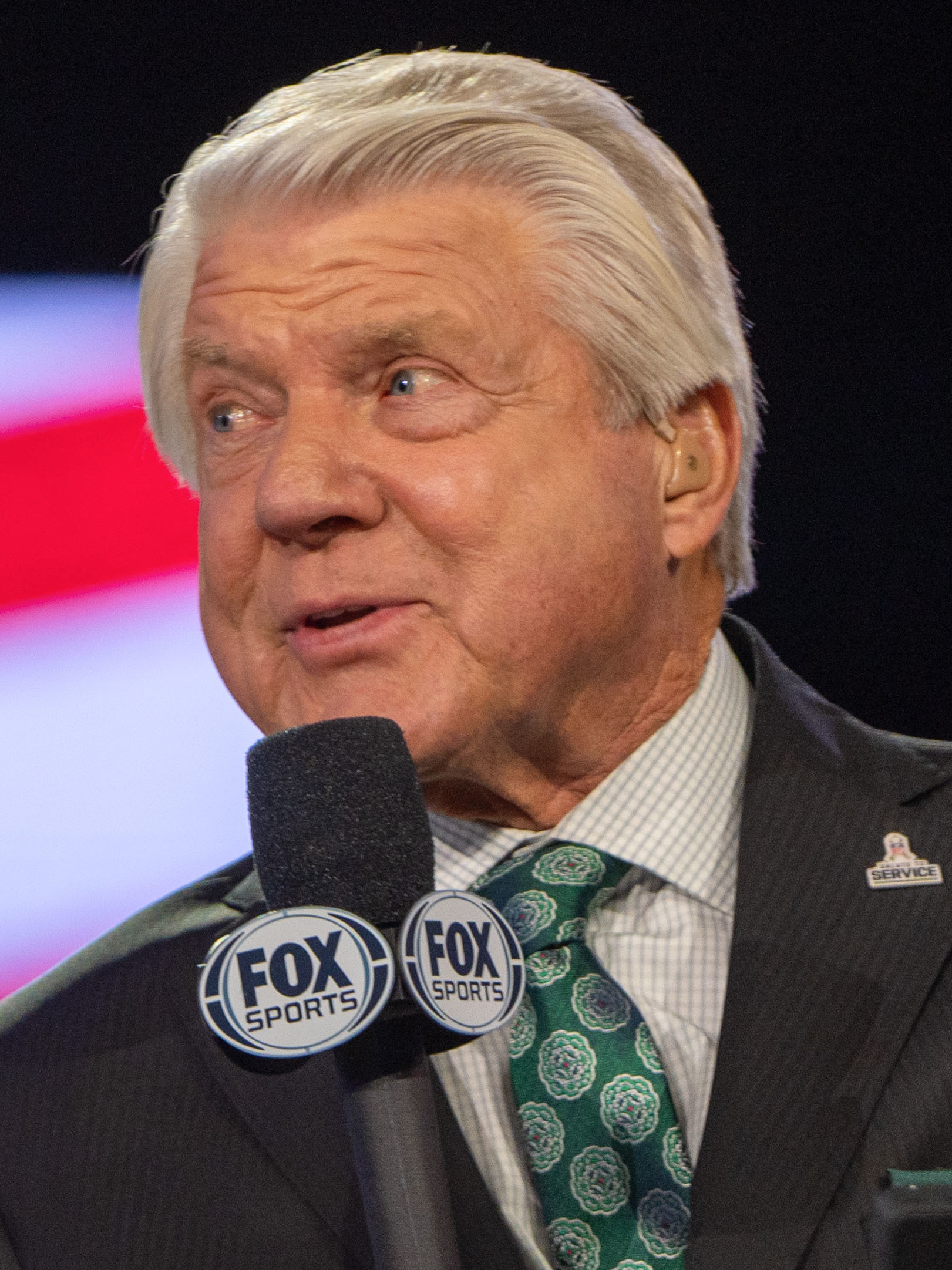
Jimmy Johnson

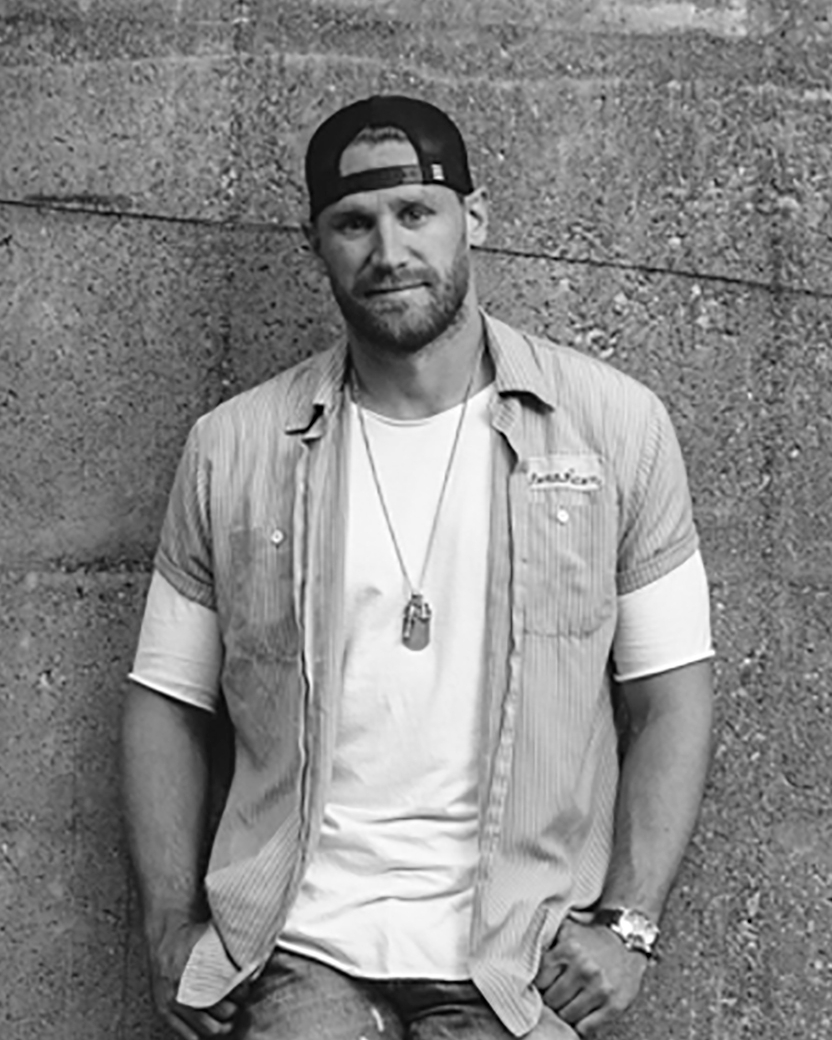
Chase Rice

The cast is composed of 20 players, initially splitting into two tribes based on their ages containing 10 members each. The tribes are Espada, contestants aged 40 and over; and La Flor, contestants aged 30 and younger. Their names come from the Spanish words "sword" and "flower", respectively. The merged tribe Libertad means "liberty" or "freedom" in Spanish, which was first suggested by contestant Marty Piombo.

Notable contestants this season include Kelly Bruno, a triathlete whose leg was amputated at six months old because of a birth defect; Chase Rice, a NASCAR pit crew member who became a country music artist after the season aired; and former Dallas Cowboys coach Jimmy Johnson. Bruno is the second Survivor contestant to be an amputee, the first being Chad Crittenden of Survivor: Vanuatu. She would be followed by Noelle Lambert in Survivor 43.

List of Survivor: Nicaragua contestants
Contestant	Age	From	Tribe			Finish	
Contestant	Age	From	Original	Switched	Merged	Placement	Day
Wendy DeSmidt-Kohlhoff	48	Fromberg, Montana	Espada			1st voted out	Day 3
Shannon Elkins	30	Lafayette, Louisiana	La Flor			2nd voted out	Day 6
Jimmy Johnson	67	Islamorada, Florida	Espada			3rd voted out	Day 8
Jimmy Tarantino	48	Gloucester, Massachusetts	Espada			4th voted out	Day 11
Tyrone Davis	42	Inglewood, California	Espada	Espada		5th voted out	Day 14
Kelly Bruno	26	Durham, North Carolina	La Flor	La Flor		6th voted out	Day 15
Yve Rojas	41	Kansas City, Missouri	Espada	Espada		7th voted out	Day 15
Jill Behm	43	Erie, Pennsylvania	Espada	La Flor		8th voted out	Day 18
Alina Wilson	23	Downey, California	La Flor	Espada	Libertad	9th voted out 1st jury member	Day 22
Marty Piombo	48	Mill Valley, California	Espada	La Flor	Libertad	10th voted out 2nd jury member	Day 24
Brenda Lowe	27	Miami, Florida	La Flor	La Flor	Libertad	11th voted out 3rd jury member	Day 27
NaOnka Mixon	27	Los Angeles, California	La Flor	Espada	Libertad	Quit; 4th jury member	Day 28
Kelly Shinn	20	Mesa, Arizona	La Flor	La Flor	Libertad	Quit; 5th jury member	Day 28
Ben "Benry" Henry	24	Los Angeles, California	La Flor	Espada	Libertad	12th voted out 6th jury member	Day 32
Jane Bright	56	Jackson Springs, North Carolina	Espada	La Flor	Libertad	13th voted out 7th jury member	Day 36
Dan Lembo	63	Water Mill, New York	Espada	Espada	Libertad	14th voted out 8th jury member	Day 37
Holly Hoffman	44	Eureka, South Dakota	Espada	Espada	Libertad	15th voted out 9th jury member	Day 38
Matthew "Sash" Lenahan	30	New York City, New York	La Flor	La Flor	Libertad	2nd Runner-up	Day 39
Chase Rice	24	Fairview, North Carolina	La Flor	Espada	Libertad	Runner-up	Day 39
Jud "Fabio" Birza	21	Venice, California	La Flor	La Flor	Libertad	Sole Survivor	Day 39

=== Future appearances ===
In 2013, Brenda Lowe returned to compete on Survivor: Caramoan.

== Season summary ==
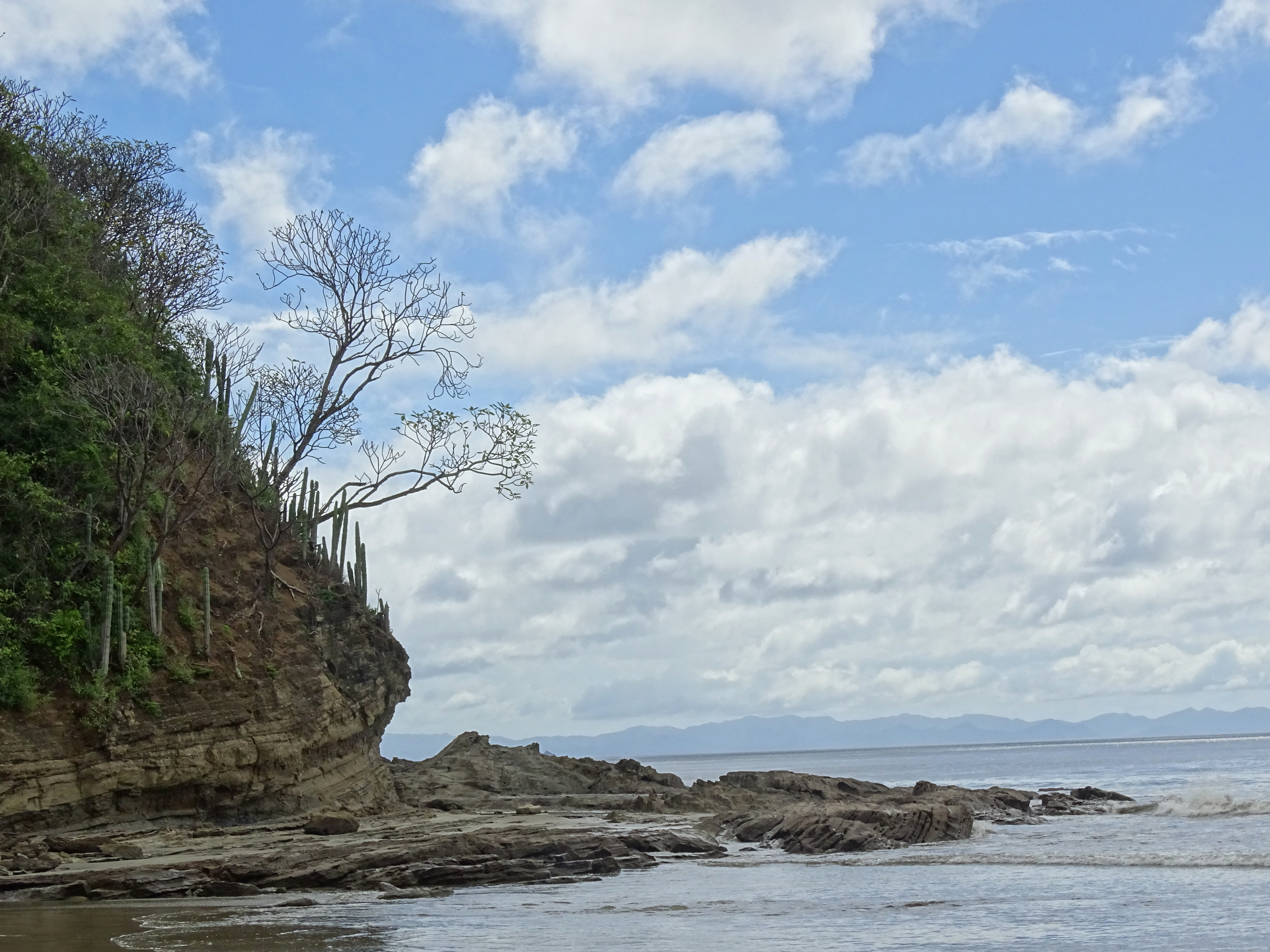
The season filmed in San Juan del Sur in Nicaragua.

Twenty new castaways were divided into tribes by age: La Flor, which consisted of castaways 30 and younger, and Espada, which consisted of castaways 40 and older. Both tribes also vied for ownership of the newly-introduced Medallion of Power, which granted them advantages either at camp or when played in challenges. Every time a tribe used its power, ownership of the Medallion would shift to the other tribe.

Several members of the older Espada tribe vied for leadership. While Jimmy J. initially took control, he was quickly overthrown by Marty and voted out. Marty furthered his control of the tribe by finding the Hidden Immunity Idol and voting out aspiring leader Jimmy T. Despite dominating the challenges in the first eleven days of the game, the younger La Flor tribe also had their own share of conflicts. Two warring alliances emerged, one led by Shannon and the other led by Brenda, with both alliances vying for Chase's vote. A confused Shannon lashed out at La Flor's first Tribal Council, causing Chase and some of Shannon's own alliance members to vote him out.

A tribe swap on Day 12 caused allegiances to shift. Alina, Benry, Chase, and NaOnka moved to Espada, while Marty, Jill, and Jane moved to La Flor. At the new Espada, Holly and Dan aligned themselves with the younger members. At the new La Flor, the once-powerful Marty fell from grace, and Jane teamed up with the original La Flor tribe members. Brenda planned to split the vote between Marty and original La Flor outsider Kelly B. in order to flush Marty's idol and send Kelly B. home. Unfortunately for them, Marty decided not to use his idol and Kelly B. was sent home anyway, while Marty still had his immunity idol. Sash told Marty that in order to remain in the game, he must give him his idol. Marty complied, and Sash stayed true to his word by keeping him around, only to send Jill, Marty's closest ally, home instead.

On Day 19, the two tribes were merged into the Libertad tribe. Brenda's original La Flor alliance regrouped, with the addition of Holly and Jane. Marty, however, convinced Dan, Benry, and Fabio to follow him. Without any alliances, Alina was targeted by both voting blocs and sent to the jury first. Marty then tried to form an all-male rebellion against the females, which did not work and sent him home instead. It seemed that Brenda and Sash were in total control of the tribe, but Holly made her own move by turning everybody else on Brenda. Brenda put her faith wholly in her alliance without attempting to plead with them, but they ultimately eliminated her. Meanwhile, while the tribe was at a challenge, their unattended fire ignited their cache of food and supplies, burning them and part of their tarp. The remaining tribe members struggled with the meager rations.

With Brenda gone and the sudden voluntary exits of Kelly S. and NaOnka as a result of the camp fire, Sash was left alone without any allies, but eventually regained power by winning the next Immunity Challenge, becoming the swing vote between Holly, Chase and Jane's alliance and the alliance of Dan, Fabio and Benry. Sash joined Chase, Holly and Jane to eliminate an unsuspecting Benry, whom Sash saw as the bigger threat. The newly formed majority alliance planned to eliminate Fabio next, but he went on to win individual immunity. While Dan was the only non-immune of the minority alliance, Chase, Holly and Sash decided to turn on jury threat Jane, and voted her out instead. Fabio won immunity again and Dan was voted out, but after Fabio won his third successive immunity challenge, Chase and Sash decided to turn on Holly, who they thought had the best chance to win the game against them.

At the Final Tribal Council, the jurors made it clear they would not vote for Sash for his numerous lies and deceptions. Chase was blasted for his inability to make strategic and social decisions, and Fabio was accused of being clueless about what was going on, not voting in the majority many times. Chase was praised however for his honesty, performing well in team challenges, and making relationships with people. Fabio said he was open with everyone, and intentionally was strategically clueless because he didn't want to hurt or play with anyone's emotions. Because of this, Fabio's unique strategy earned him the votes of five jurors, to Chase's four and Sash's zero.

Challenge winners and eliminations by episode
Episode			Challenge winner(s)		Eliminated	
No.	Title	Original air date	Reward	Immunity	Tribe	Player
1	"Young at Heart"	September 15, 2010	Brenda (Note: Brenda found the Medallion of Power, giving La Flor possession of it to start the game.) (La Flor)	La Flor	Espada	Wendy
2	"Fatigue Makes Cowards of Us All"	September 22, 2010	Espada		La Flor	Shannon
3	"Glitter in Their Eyes"	September 29, 2010	La Flor		Espada	Jimmy J.
4	"Pulling the Trigger"	October 6, 2010	La Flor		Espada	Jimmy T.
5	"Turf Wars"	October 13, 2010	Espada	La Flor	Espada	Tyrone
6	"Worst Case Scenario"	October 20, 2010	Jill (Note: Each tribe competed separately for individual immunity. The two winners, Jill and Holly, moved on to the final round. Jill won the final round, winning reward for La Flor.) (La Flor)	Jill (La Flor)	La Flor	Kelly B.
6	"Worst Case Scenario"	October 20, 2010	Jill (La Flor)	Holly (Espada)	Espada	Yve
7	"What Goes Around, Comes Around"	October 27, 2010	Espada	Espada	La Flor	Jill
8	"Company Will Be Arriving Soon"	November 3, 2010	None (Note: There was no reward challenge due to the merge.)	Jane	Libertad	Alina
8	"Company Will Be Arriving Soon"	November 3, 2010	None	Fabio	Libertad	Alina
9	"Running the Camp"	November 10, 2010	Benry, Dan, Fabio, Marty, Sash	Brenda	Libertad	Marty
10	"Stuck in the Middle"	November 17, 2010	Chase, Fabio, Jane, Kelly S., NaOnka	Jane	Libertad	Brenda
11	"We Did it Guys"	November 24, 2010	Recap Episode			
12	"You Started, You're Finishing"	December 1, 2010	Benry, Chase, ~~Holly~~, (Note: Holly gave up her reward in exchange for a tarp and a can of rice for the tribe.); NaOnka [Dan] (Note: Dan did not participate in the challenge after not being chosen for a team, but he had correctly guessed the winning team and, as a result, joined them on the reward.)	None (Note: There was no immunity challenge due to NaOnka and Kelly S. quitting the game.)	Libertad	NaOnka
12	"You Started, You're Finishing"	December 1, 2010	Benry, Chase, ~~Holly~~, NaOnka [Dan]	None	Libertad	Kelly S.
13	"Not Sure Where I Stand"	December 8, 2010	Chase [Holly, Jane]	Sash	Libertad	Benry
14	"This is Going to Hurt"	December 15, 2010	Chase [Holly, Sash]	Fabio	Libertad	Jane
15	"What About Me?"	December 19, 2010	None	Fabio	Libertad	Dan
15	"What About Me?"	December 19, 2010	None	Fabio	Libertad	Holly
16	"Reunion"	December 19, 2010				

In the case of multiple tribes or castaways who win reward or immunity, they are listed in order of finish, or alphabetically where it was a team effort; where one castaway won and invited others, the invitees are in brackets.

== Episodes ==
No. overall	No. in season	Title	Rating/share (household)	Rating/share (18-49)	Original release date	U.S. viewers (millions)	Weekly rank
305	1	"Young at Heart"	6.8/12	4.0/13	September 15, 2010	12.23	#7
The game started with the castaways split into two groups. When they arrived at the beach, Jeff announced the Medallion of Power, though did not explain what the power was, and that it was hidden in a lagoon nearby. The castaways scrambled to find it, with Brenda finding it up a tree. When the castaways reassembled in front of Jeff, he announced that the groups they arrived in are not the tribes, but instead the tribes would be split by age, with the 40 and over castaways called Espada and the 30 and under castaways called La Flor. La Flor then traded the Medallion of Power to Espada in exchange for flint and fishing gear. Once at the Espada camp, Jane started a fire with a pair of reading glasses. At the La Flor campsite, Kelly B. showed her tribe her amputated leg, which made several of her tribemates cautious about a sympathy vote for her should she make it to the final Tribal Council. Chase made an alliance with Shannon and then made another one with Brenda. Alina and Kelly B. found a clue to the Hidden Immunity Idol while picking up the tree mail. They could not decipher the clue, but decided to keep the clue to themselves.: Immunity Challenge: One castaway would stand at the top of a tower and pour water down five gutters held by five castaways. The water would fill a barrel, which would release a net of puzzle pieces when full. The four remaining castaways would assemble the puzzle. The first tribe to assemble their puzzle would win.; Medallion Advantage: Starting the challenge with the barrel filled one-fifth of the way.; At the Immunity Challenge, Jeff explained the power behind the Medallion of Power. Espada decided to not use the Medallion and then lost the challenge. Before heading to Tribal Council, the tribe debated between getting rid of Jimmy J. or Wendy for being weak links. Holly was conflicted due to her pact with Wendy. At Tribal Council, Wendy made a short speech just before the vote in an effort to remain in the game. The appeal worked against her and she seemed to confirm the tribe's decision to boot her. The votes were read and Wendy was voted out unanimously.
306	2	"Fatigue Makes Cowards of Us All"	7.0/12	4.0/12	September 22, 2010	12.59	#19
At La Flor, Sash made an alliance with NaOnka and Brenda and talked about creating a "minority alliance". NaOnka thought somebody stole her pair of socks out of her shoes while they were hanging up, so she took Fabio's spare socks and then had a short confrontation with him when he attempted to ask her about the socks. Over at Espada, Holly snapped at Jill for eating snails which Holly thought were inedible. Holly dumped the snails, which caused the rest of her tribe to question what had gone wrong with her. Holly overheard Dan calling her "crazy" and decided to take revenge on him by dumping his $1,600 pair of alligator-skin shoes into the ocean. After a while, she confessed to the tribe to dumping them into the sea. Holly thought about quitting the game, but decided to keep going after receiving counseling from Jimmy J.: Reward/Immunity Challenge: One at a time, four tribe members would crawl in the mud under a net and then retrieve a ball from a stack of hay. Once all four balls were retrieved, three tribe members would use small shields to bounce one ball at a time into a barrel. The first tribe to have all four balls in the barrel would win a choice of a tarp and a rope or fishing gear.; Medallion Advantage: Starting the challenge with one ball already in the barrel and having one tribe member sit out the challenge.; At the Reward/Immunity Challenge, Espada used the Medallion of Power and ended up winning the challenge. Espada chose to take the fishing gear for their reward. While unwrapping the fishing gear, the tribe found a clue to the Hidden Immunity Idol. Jill figured out the last part of the clue and told Marty in a ploy to gain his trust. Using the clue, the two found the Hidden Immunity Idol. Before Tribal Council, La Flor seemed like they had an easy decision and NaOnka was to go because of her fiery personality. However, discussions turned to Brenda, who seemed like a bigger threat (due to her being seen with Chase). The tribe seemed divided with NaOnka, Brenda, Sash and Kelly S. on one side, and Shannon, Alina, Kelly B., Fabio and Benry on the other side. NaOnka and Brenda started to try to garner the votes to boot Shannon. Chase was conflicted due to his ties with both Shannon and Brenda. However, Brenda seemed to cast doubt on Chase's alliance with Shannon and it seemed like there would be a tie vote. At Tribal Council, Shannon was very aggressive in his answers during Jeff's questions resulting in a fiery Tribal Council discussion, even accusing Sash of being gay. The vote was taken and Shannon's aggressive answers and homophobic statements did not help his case. Kelly B. and Benry flipped their votes, and he was sent home.
307	3	"Glitter in Their Eyes"	7.1/12	3.5/11	September 29, 2010	12.26	#18
At Espada, Marty was getting more resentful of Jimmy J.'s position within the tribe. Jill told Marty that he should show the tribe the Hidden Immunity Idol, so he did and announced that he was sharing it with the tribe to make them stronger post merger. Over at La Flor, the alliance of Brenda, Chase, Kelly S., NaOnka, and Sash discussed voting out Alina.: Reward/Immunity Challenge: The tribes would race out into a field to retrieve ten barrels. Once all ten barrels were retrieved, the tribe would stack them on individual platforms arranged in a triangle formation. One tribe member would then attempt to toss a sandbag onto the top of each barrel. The first tribe to have a sandbag on all ten barrels would win sauces, spices, fruit, and an herb garden.; Medallion Advantage: Starting with two barrels on the platform with sandbags on top.; At the combined Reward/Immunity Challenge, La Flor won the challenge without using the Medallion of Power. When Kelly B. and NaOnka picked up the basket of fruit that was part of the reward, they both noticed a note tucked within the basket, but neither made a move toward it. However, as soon as they reached their camp, the two tussled over the note in full view of their tribemates. NaOnka won the tussle and walked off alone with the clue to the Hidden Immunity Idol. She wasn't able to decipher the clues and shared it with Brenda, who wasn't able to decipher it either. Back at Espada's camp, Jimmy J. and Dan were on the chopping block. Marty lobbied hard to keep his ally Dan in the game and wanted Jimmy J. voted out. Jill and Jimmy T. quickly went along with Marty's plan, though Tyrone wanted to vote out Dan for being the weakest in challenges. In the end, Tyrone and the rest of the tribe chose to vote out the NFL Coach, sending Jimmy Johnson home.
308	4	"Pulling the Trigger"	7.0/12	3.8/11	October 6, 2010	12.05	#19
At La Flor, Brenda and NaOnka found the Hidden Immunity Idol. NaOnka kept the idol. Alina and Kelly B. noticed that Brenda and NaOnka were searching for the idol and set off to find it themselves, not knowing that NaOnka already had it. NaOnka overtly followed the two and then argued with Kelly B. Over at Espada, the tribe tried to strategize and practice for the upcoming challenge with Marty nominating Tyrone to lead them as tribe caller. As Marty predicted, this nomination did not go over well with Jimmy T. who asserted that he wanted to lead the tribe in a challenge.: Reward/Immunity Challenge: One tribe member would act as a caller to guide three blindfolded pairs of tribemates to collect ten items scattered in a field and bring them to the tribe mat. Once all ten items were collected, one pair would have to be guided to collect a set of keys and then to a locked chest. The first tribe to unlock the chest and bring it to their tribe mat would win a choice of three items collected during the challenge such as a toolkit, a tarp, rope and a knife, fishing gear, a collapsible chair, and a grill.; Medallion Advantage: Starting with two items already on the mat.; At the combined Reward/Immunity Challenge, La Flor used the Medallion of Power advantage and easily won over Espada. La Flor selected fishing gear, a tarp, and cooking supplies as their reward. When they returned to camp, Chase found a clue to the Hidden Immunity Idol in the tackle box, which he shared with Brenda. Brenda told him that she and NaOnka had already found the idol and to keep that information to himself as she did not want to jeopardize the trust that she had established with NaOnka. When Espada returned to their camp, Jimmy T. repeated his request to be given a shot at leading the tribe in a challenge. He also called out Marty for not being a team player when the tribe went searching for food. Marty then targeted Jimmy T. for elimination at Tribal Council. At Tribal Council, Jimmy T. again repeated his plea to lead the tribe just once in a challenge, but he would not get the chance as the tribe voted him out.
309	5	"Turf Wars"	6.9/11	3.8/11	October 13, 2010	12.32	#15
Marty and NaOnka thought they were in total control of their tribes, but Jeff spoiled their plans by telling the castaways to drop their buffs as there would be a tribal switch before the start of the Reward Challenge. The castaways drew rocks for captains, with Brenda and Holly being selected. Brenda was told to pick three members from the older tribe that would join the younger tribe and she picked Jane, Jill, and Marty. Holly had to pick four members from the younger tribe to join the older tribe and she selected Alina, Benry, Chase, and NaOnka. Jeff declared that the old-versus-young tribal dynamic was done, and so was the Medallion of Power.: Reward Challenge: Playing in rounds, two members from one tribe would roll balls along a board with various pegs that would impede the ball's progress. Two members from the other tribe would attempt to catch the balls as they exited the bottom of the board. If the two castaways fail to catch a ball, the other tribe would score a point and next round would be played. The first tribe to score three points would win two hens and one rooster.; The newly formed tribes went on to compete in the Reward Challenge and Espada took the win. Back at Espada's camp, Tyrone told the new young tribe members how the camp worked, which did not sit well with Alina and NaOnka. Holly tried to align herself with the younger group. Over at La Flor, Jane told Brenda and Kelly B. to watch out for Marty and Jill's alliance. Marty told the tribe that he had a Hidden Immunity Idol. On day 13, an intense rain storm drove NaOnka to break down emotionally and she considered quitting, but Alina and Chase convinced her to stick it out.: Immunity Challenge: Three members from each tribe would be strapped to a large wheel. Three other tribe members would spin the wheel, which would cause one strapped in castaway at a time to be dunked head first into water. While under water, the castaway would take water in the mouth, which they would then spit into a tube. Once the tube was filled, a ball would be released. The ball would be used by two other tribe members to break five tiles. The first tribe to break all five tiles would win.; The Immunity Challenge was won by La Flor when Fabio and Jane came from behind during the tile breaking stage. Espada voted to kill one of the chickens before they head off to Tribal Council, so they killed one of the hens. Tyrone didn't want to kill the chicken and he was perceived to have taken a larger share of the chicken. The tribe considered voting out NaOnka for potentially quitting and Tyrone for being too bossy, but the vote went against Tyrone at Tribal Council and he was voted off.
310	6	"Worst Case Scenario"	7.0/12	3.6/11	October 20, 2010	12.26	#14
On day 15, Dan thought about quitting the game. Yve asked Holly about why she wasn't told about the previous Tribal Council vote against Tyrone. When Yve found out from Holly that Dan was thinking of quitting, Yve thought she could use that info to lobby the younger members of the Espada tribe in voting out Dan. Over at La Flor, Brenda planned to flush out the Hidden Immunity Idol by splitting a 3–3 vote between Marty and Jill.: Immunity Challenge: The castaways would use paddles to dig up three rope rings one at a time, tossed into a basket strapped to their lower backs, and returned to the start line. The first tribe member to return all three rings to the start line would win.; Reward Challenge: The winners of the Immunity Challenge would compete against each other to toss three rope rings onto hooks on a board set a few feet away. The winner would receive a feast of chicken and beef kebabs to be eaten while listening to the other tribe's Tribal Council.; When the tribes arrived for the Immunity Challenge, Jeff announced that they would not be playing for Tribal Immunity, but would be playing for Individual Immunity as both tribes would be going to Tribal Council that night. Jeff then announced that the winners of the Individual Immunities would then compete in the Reward Challenge. Jill and Holly won Individual Immunity for La Flor and Espada, respectively; Jill then won reward for her tribe. Jill's immunity threw Brenda's plan into disarray and she came up with a new plan with Sash: to split the 3–3 vote between Marty and Kelly B., while telling Kelly B. that the vote would be split between Marty and Jane. Marty worked on getting Fabio to join the older alliance by fabricating a story that he was a chess grandmaster and that as a child, he had beaten Guillermo Vilas, who actually played tennis and was not a chess grandmaster. Sash told Fabio to vote for Marty, but Fabio had believed Marty's chess story and was conflicted about voting for Marty since he thought Marty was offering him an alliance and insight into his game. At Espada, Yve continued her lobbying against Dan as being the weaker player in challenges and him thinking about quitting. The younger members of the tribe were split between voting Dan or Yve as she was seen as the bigger threat within the game. At La Flor's Tribal Council, the plan to flush the Hidden Immunity Idol did not work when Marty did not play it and the vote ended up being a tie 3–3–2 between Marty, Kelly B., and Brenda. A second vote was taken with Marty and Kelly B. not voting and the others only voting for those two. The vote swung against a very surprised Kelly B. and she was voted out. The remaining La Flor members then moved to the side to enjoy their feast and observe Espada's Tribal Council. Yve continued her lobbying against Dan, but she was unable to convince the tribe to vote against him and she was voted out.
311	7	"What Goes Around, Comes Around"	6.6/11	3.5/10	October 27, 2010	11.82	#19
After Espada returned to their camp site, Chase, Holly, and NaOnka talked about voting out Alina ahead of the merge. Over at La Flor, Marty was seething over Jane's flip to the younger group at Tribal Council and confronted her about it, but she neither confirmed or denied her vote.: Reward Challenge: One member from each tribe would act as a defender and stand on a small platform above a pool of water. The opposing tribe members would leap off a platform on one end of the pool into the water and try to throw a ball into a net on the far end. The defender would attempt to knock the ball away from the net. A point would be scored for each ball successfully thrown into the net. The first tribe to score five points would win a trip to a Nicaraguan farm for a horseback ride and breakfast.; Immunity Challenge: Two members from each tribe would stand on top of a tower and roll cannonballs down a chute. Four other members of the tribe would use ropes to guide the chute so that cannonball would break five tiles arranged in a field. The first tribe to break all five tiles would win.; Espada won back to back challenges by winning both the Reward and Immunity Challenges. With the La Flor loss, the younger group had another opportunity to flush the Hidden Immunity Idol and they planned to split the vote 3–2 between Marty and Jill. If Marty played the Idol, the vote would be tied between Jill and whomever the Marty/Jill alliance would vote for and the younger group would then vote out Jill. Meanwhile, Sash came up with the plan to tell Marty that he would be safe at the next Tribal Council if he gave up the Hidden Immunity Idol. Sash sweetened the deal by telling Marty that if La Flor lost the next Immunity Challenge, Sash would return the Hidden Immunity Idol. Marty decided to give the Idol to Sash instead of playing it at Tribal Council hoping to stay in the game and make it to the Tribal Merge. At Tribal Council, the younger tribe kept their word about keeping Marty and Jill was sent home.
312	8	"Company Will Be Arriving Soon"	7.0/11	3.7/11	November 3, 2010	12.30	#13
Marty was ecstatic that the tree mail on day 19 announced the tribal merge and a move to the Espada camp site. Before La Flor arrived, Alina lobbied for the six Espada members to stick together to the final six, but there was little enthusiasm for such an alliance. Marty named the new tribe 'Libertad', the Spanish word for freedom. After the merge, Brenda and NaOnka reestablished their alliance made before the tribal switch and told each other what had happened at each tribe. On day 20, NaOnka made breakfast, but got angry when she ate last and got the smallest share. Her anger prompted her to steal food and supplies which she hid in the jungle. NaOnka shared her stolen items with Alina and told Alina that she was being targeted by the tribe. When other members of the tribe noticed that items were missing, Holly said that she saw NaOnka take the flour jar and put in her bag. NaOnka vehemently denied that she took the flour, claiming that she put it back, but did not explain why the flour was in her bag. Eventually, NaOnka confessed to stealing the food after Alina and Chase convinced her that if she confessed, it would be better than continuing to lie. Even then, she tried to convince them that she stole it for the benefit of the tribe, and so that they wouldn't greedily eat all of it too soon. But most of the others, most prominently Marty, refused to believe this story and knew that she stole the food for her own benefit. The alliance of Brenda, Chase, Jane, and Sash decided to protect NaOnka by distancing themselves from her. Sash admitted that it would be better strategically to bring NaOnka to the finale at this point because of her actions, as obviously, no one would vote for her to win, which would greatly benefit whoever else was in the finale with her.: Immunity Challenge: The castaways would use two metal handles to hold a metal bar in tension above a tile. The last man and woman to keep tension on the bar and keep it from breaking the tile would win.; At the Immunity Challenge, Jane stayed in the challenge to continue to compete against the men even though she had already won the women's side of the challenge. Fabio outlasted Chase to win the men's side. Jane told the rest of the women that she stayed in the challenge to show up Marty. The tribe was split between voting for Marty or Alina. Sash asked his alliance to keep Marty around for one more Tribal Council so that he could keep his word on the deal that he made with Marty to give up the Hidden Immunity Idol. At Tribal Council, Marty was very vocal that Jane was the biggest threat to win the game, even going so far as announcing that should Jane reach the Final Tribal Council that he would vote for her. The votes were cast and after the tally, Alina became the first jury member.
313	9	"Running the Camp"	6.4/10	3.2/10	November 10, 2010	11.29	#19
The day after Tribal Council, Marty continued his plotting against Jane by proposing a plan to Benry and Dan to feign a vote against NaOnka to Chase and Holly, but really vote for Jane. Marty said that this would flush out NaOnka's Hidden Immunity Idol and blindside Jane.: Reward Challenge: The tribe would be randomly split into two teams. The teams would run an obstacle course of a hay stack, a rope crawl, a reed blocked pathway, a net crawl, and a brick wall. Along the way of the course would be three stations where a key is suspended in the air on a metal spring. The team would have to work together to reach the key and free it from the spring. The first team to collect all three keys and unlock their team's flag would win a tour of the jungle canopy with zip-lining and a barbecue feast.; At the Reward Challenge, the random draw for teams turned out to be men versus women. Since there were eleven castaways, Chase was the odd man out and did not participate. However, he could select the team he thought would win, and if they won, he would join them on the reward. He selected the women, but this turned out to be a poor choice when the men won the challenge. On the reward, Marty continued his lobbying for his plan to vote out Jane.: Immunity Challenge: The castaways would test their memory by having to memorize a series of symbols shown by Jeff. The castaways would have to show back the symbols in order. If they showed the wrong symbol, they would be out of the challenge. The last castaway to show all of the correct symbols would win.; The Immunity Challenge was won by Brenda. Back at camp, Marty put his plan into motion by telling Chase that the men were voting for NaOnka. Chase told Holly that he thought the guys were trying to blindside Jane and he was voting for Marty. Marty told Brenda that the plan to flush the idol and blindside Jane was Sash's idea. Brenda and Sash talked over their swing votes by either joining the Marty or Jane blocs. At Tribal Council, the discussion became heated when NaOnka made an expletive-filled rant towards Marty and Fabio, culminating with NaOnka giving Marty the finger. Marty's plan to flush the idol failed when NaOnka did not feel threatened enough to play her idol. When the time to vote came, Brenda and Sash decided to join the bloc voting against Marty and he was sent to the jury.
314	10	"Stuck in the Middle"	6.9/11	3.5/10	November 17, 2010	11.98	#17
After Brenda and Sash tipped their alliances at the last Tribal Council, Holly decided that she had to make a move in the game and get either Brenda or Sash voted out next. She then recruited Jane, Benry, and NaOnka into voting for Brenda. She talked to Chase about voting for Brenda, but he was more concerned about Benry being a bigger threat. Holly left Kelly S. out of the plan believing that she wouldn't switch because she was riding Brenda's coattail. A rain storm came and the tribe moved their three wooden chests around the fire in order to protect it before they headed off to the challenge.: Reward Challenge: The tribe would be split into two teams by school yard pick. The teams would be given four barrels, two wood planks, and 10 feet (3.0 m) of rope that they would use to cross the beach without stepping on the sand. If any team member steps onto the sand, the entire team would have to restart from the beginning. The first team to reach the finish line would win a helicopter trip to the Cerro Negro volcano with volcano surfing and pizza, brownies, and soft drinks.; At the Reward Challenge, the team of Chase, Fabio, Jane, Kelly S., and NaOnka cruised to victory. While on their reward, NaOnka took Fabio aside and filled him in on the plan to vote out Brenda. Kelly S. looked on in surprise and questioned their actions to Chase but he didn't fill her in on the blindside against Brenda. When the losing team returned to camp, they discovered that the three chests had caught fire and burned down, taking with it their machetes and almost all of the tribe's food. After the winning team returned to camp, Chase told Brenda the entire plan to vote her out, but Brenda shrugged it off. Chase again lobbied to vote out Benry to NaOnka, but NaOnka would not budge and she then told Benry, Jane, and Holly that Chase could not be trusted, since he had told Brenda about their plan.: Immunity Challenge: The castaways would stand on small platforms and hang on to a rope while leaning backwards over a pool of water. The rope would have knots tied along its length. In five-minute intervals, the castaways would have to move further down the rope to the next knot, increasing the angle at which they were hanging over the water. The last castaway to hang onto the rope would win.; At the Immunity Challenge, after a showdown between Jane and Chase, Jane claimed victory; and afterwards, Chase once again lobbied to vote out Benry, but this time to Sash. NaOnka told Sash about the plan to vote out Brenda and he was then torn between giving the Hidden Immunity Idol to Brenda or letting the plan go through. At Tribal Council, Brenda called out NaOnka for splitting up the original alliance, while NaOnka tried to deflect the blame onto Chase. Sash and Kelly S. said they both felt it was the first time they had been left out of the loop. Brenda defiantly refused to scramble to stay in the game, leaving it up to her trust in her alliance to keep her in the game. However, it was not to be and she was voted out.
315	11	"We Did it Guys"	4.7/8	2.0/7	November 24, 2010	8.02	#24
A recap of the first 27 days including previously un-aired bonus footage.
316	12	"You Started, You're Finishing"	7.0/11	3.6/11	December 1, 2010	12.26	#6
When the tribe returned from camp after Tribal Council, Kelly S. felt left out of her alliance as she did not know that the vote was going against Brenda. NaOnka felt that Brenda had "thrown her under the bus". Holly told NaOnka that she trusted her more now that she had told her about Brenda's plans. Chase thought that the core alliance was himself, Holly, Jane, and NaOnka. On Day 28, the rain returned with a vengeance and made camp life miserable. NaOnka and Kelly S. had doubts that they could continue in the game, as they were both exhausted by the conditions of the weather. NaOnka gave her Hidden Immunity Idol to Chase, and with NaOnka thinking about quitting, the alliance of Chase, Holly and Jane brought in Sash, but he preferred that NaOnka and Kelly S. stayed in the game and considered joining Benry, Dan, and Fabio in an alliance.: Reward Challenge: The tribe would be divided into two teams by school yard pick. The teams would be tethered together and would untie from a table an 8-foot (2.4 m) stuffed dummy named "Gulliver" after the novel Gulliver's Travels. The teams would then carry the dummy through a series of obstacles. The first team to cross the finish line would win a viewing of the upcoming film of the titular novel, hot dogs, nachos, popcorn, candy, and drinks.; At the Reward Challenge, Dan was left out of the challenge from the school yard pick. He decided to back the team of Benry, Chase, Holly, and NaOnka, which meant he would join them if they won the challenge. The choice turned out to be a good one as the four won the closely fought challenge. As soon as the challenge ended, NaOnka announced that she wanted to quit the game. A stunned Jeff asked if anybody else wanted to quit and Kelly S. said that she did. Jeff told the two women that they should think about if they really wanted to quit and that the tribe would meet at Tribal Council that night to sort out the matter. Jeff then offered a tarp and a can of rice to replace the ones lost in the camp fire if one of the winning team members would forgo their reward, to which Holly stepped up and volunteered. Benry tried to make NaOnka step up and volunteer since she had wanted to quit, but NaOnka remained silent. Benry, Chase, Dan, and NaOnka went off to their reward. During the reward, NaOnka gave her hidden immunity idol to Chase because she wanted to quit. Back at camp, Holly tried to convince Kelly S. to stay in the game. Later that night, the five who didn't go on the reward arrived at Tribal Council followed a short time later by the four who did and the members of the jury. Jeff and the tribe discussed what it took to keep the desire to stay in the game and why NaOnka and Kelly S. were considering to quit. Jeff then asked NaOnka if she did want to quit and she replied that she did. Kelly S. was asked the same question and she also stated she wanted to quit. Jeff asked the two women what should happen to their torches. They asked for them to be snuffed as per usual practice, which Jeff agreed to, but then said that the snuffed torches would remain in the Tribal Council area as a reminder to the two women that while they served on the jury, they had quit the game instead of getting voted out. Their torches were then snuffed (and laid down) and the two left Tribal Council and became members of the jury.
317	13	"Not Sure Where I Stand"	6.8/11	3.6/10	December 8, 2010	12.13	#10
With NaOnka and Kelly S. quitting, Sash knew that he was the fourth man between the two three-person alliances of Chase/Holly/Jane and Benry/Dan/Fabio. Sash told Benry, Chase, and Fabio that he would play his Hidden Immunity Idol at the next Tribal Council so that he would no longer be seen as a threat and to get the two alliances to see him as a swing vote. Chase told Sash that he would take him all the way to the end and that he would take Sash on the next reward along with Holly, since she had given up her last reward.: Reward Challenge: The castaways would be given a second chance against previous challenges. The castaways would crawl in the mud under a net and then retrieve a ball from a stack of hay. The ball would then have to be bounced off a shield on the ground and into a barrel. The first four castaways to get their ball into the barrel would advance to the next round. In the second round, the four castaways would use a stick to retrieve a key suspended above on a metal spring. The key would unlock a chest that contains four sandbags. The first two castaways to toss all four of their sandbags on top of a barrel would advance to the final round. In the final round, the two castaways would use a paddle to dig up three rope rings. The first castaway to toss all three rope rings onto hooks on a board set a few feet away would win an overnight trip to a private resort, which included a shower, massages and a meal.; At the Reward Challenge, Chase, Jane, Benry, and Holly advanced to the second round. Chase and Benry then advanced to the final round, which was won by Chase. To join him on the reward, Chase selected Holly and Jane, reneging on his promise to Sash. While Chase and the women were on their reward, Sash talked to the remaining three guys about joining their alliance, but Dan and Benry were leery about Sash's true alliances and did not trust him. On the reward, Chase realized that he made a major mistake by not taking Sash on the reward and that he would have to regain Sash's trust. In order to do so, Chase and Holly came up with a plan to tell Sash that the two would vote out Jane and take Sash to the final three. Chase also told Benry that Jane would not make it to the final three, to which Benry said that was fine and he was willing to vote out Fabio. Chase and Holly told Sash that leaving him behind was really a sign of trust in him, since they figured that he was loyal to them and that it would be safe to leave him alone with the Benry/Dan/Fabio alliance. Sash told Chase and Holly that Benry was lying about being willing to vote for Fabio. When Benry joined the conversation, the three told him that the next target was Fabio.: Immunity Challenge: The castaways would be attached to a rope on a hitching rail and would have to maneuver over and under the rail to unspool the rope from the rail. When the castaway thinks that there is enough rope unspooled, they would race across a field to retrieve a bag of gold coins. If they had not unspooled enough rope to reach the bag, they would have to return to the hitching rail and unspool more rope. The first three castaways to retrieve the bag would advance to the final round. In the final round, the gold coins would have to be assembled in a puzzle in the shape of a chest. The first castaway to complete the puzzle would win.; At the Immunity Challenge, Fabio, Benry, and Sash advanced to the final round where Sash solved the puzzle ahead of the other two. After the challenge, Benry, Chase, Dan, and Sash agreed to tell Fabio that the vote would go against Holly, though they would really vote for Fabio. However, in reality, Sash decided to align himself with the Chase/Holly/Jane alliance and vote out Benry. At Tribal Council, the alliance of Chase, Holly, Jane, and Sash put their plan into motion and voted against Benry, who was sent to the jury.
318	14	"This is Going to Hurt"	7.0/12	3.5/11	December 15, 2010	12.32	#10
Reward Challenge: The castaways would run up a ramp and into a pool to retrieve two bags of letter puzzle pieces. Their loved ones would then use the pieces to solve a word puzzle. The first loved one to solve the puzzle would win a trip on a sailboat along the Nicaraguan coast with food and drinks with the winning castaway's loved one.; Day 33's tree mail contained a Sprint HTC Evo 4G with videos from the castaways' loved ones: Chase's mom, Connie; Fabio's mom, Ann; Sash's mom, Lea; Dan's son Matthew; Jane's daughter, Ashley and Holly's then-husband and then-South Dakota House of Representatives member Charlie. Fabio and Chase agreed that if one of them were to win the Reward Challenge, they would take the other on the reward along with Sash. At the Reward Challenge, Jeff introduced the castaway's loved ones. The team of Chase and his mother won the challenge. Chase then selected Sash and his mother and Holly and her husband to join in the challenge, reneging on his promise to Fabio. Dan, Fabio, and Jane were very upset at Chase's choices. While on their reward, Chase, Holly, and Sash agreed that they would go to the final three together and that their top priority at this point is to get Fabio voted out.: Immunity Challenge: Blindfolded and connected to a rope, the castaways would go over and under three hitching posts to a station where there would be a shield with various symbols on it. Using only their sense of touch, the castaways would memorize the symbols and take the three bags of the symbols back to the start line. There, the castaways would have to replicate the symbols from the shield on to a second shield. Making things more difficult, the bags also contain extra pieces which do not fit on the shield. The first castaway to have all the correct symbols would win.; However, Fabio went on to win the Immunity Challenge the next day, which ruined their plan. Fabio told Chase that Jane had to go, but Chase was conflicted about the choice between Dan or Jane. Holly approached Sash and Chase and confirmed that Dan was also on board with voting off Jane. The three of them finally decided that this was the only choice left. Then Jane joined them and asked if her alliance of four with them were still strong. When the three hesitated in answering her and then finally admitting that they were discussing voting for her, Jane knew that her alliance had turned on her, and proceeded to unleash a tirade against everyone. She flipped them off immediately when she learned of their betrayal, avoided everybody else at camp for the rest of the day, and even dumped a bucket of water on the camp fire shortly before Tribal Council, stating that since she started it, she was going to put it out. At Tribal Council, Dan told Jeff and the Jury of Jane's recent actions. Jane stated that she was going to be voted out. After some digging by Jeff, the alliance of three stated that the next castaway voted out after Jane would be Fabio or Dan. Jeff then asked why Dan, Fabio, and Jane did not form an alliance and vote against Holly to force a tie with Fabio being immune due to his Individual Immunity and Chase and Sash having their Hidden Immunity Idols. The votes were cast and Chase and Sash played their idols since this Tribal Council would be their last opportunity. Jeff's suggested alliance did not form and everybody voted for Jane. Jane's sole vote against Sash was discounted and she became a member of the jury.
319	15	"What About Me?"	7.3/12	4.1/10	December 19, 2010	13.58	#8
Immunity Challenge: The castaways would race out to a station where a question about Nicaragua is posted. The castaway would have to select from one of two possible answers where a bag would be tied underneath. They would then return to the start line with the bag. If the castaway chooses the correct answer, the bag would contain puzzle pieces. If not, the puzzle pieces would be blank and they would have to return to the station and pick up the correct bag. This would be repeated for two additional questions until the castaway has three bags of puzzle pieces at which time they would assemble the puzzle. The first castaway to solve the puzzle would win.; Knowing that he was odd man out in the alliance of Chase/Holly/Sash, Fabio worked on breaking up the alliance. At the Immunity Challenge, while Fabio fell behind due to a missed answer on the second question, he quickly caught up to Chase, Holly, and Sash during the puzzle assembly stage and picked up the win. Fabio talked to Chase and Sash about voting out Holly before Dan using the argument that Holly was a bigger threat than Dan for jury votes. At Tribal Council, Dan lobbied to keeping him around because nobody would give him a million dollars and that Holly was a threat to win. However, his lobbying went for naught when he was voted out.: Immunity Challenge: The castaways would balance a sword with one hand by its tip on a shield on the ground. The castaways would then stack coins on top of the sword handle as directed by Jeff. Should any of the coins fall off of the sword, the castaway would be out of the challenge. The last castaway standing would win.; On day 38, the final four received tree mail telling them to take the traditional journey honoring the castaways voted out before heading to their final Immunity Challenge. At the challenge, Fabio outlasted Sash to take the final Individual Immunity. The win forced the Chase/Holly/Sash alliance to turn on one of their own. All three talked to Fabio about taking them to the Final Three. Sash told Fabio that if Fabio had not won immunity then Sash would have taken Chase and Fabio to the Final Three, but Fabio thought Sash might be lying. When Fabio asked Chase about the alliance's plans should Fabio lose immunity, he told him that the plan was always to vote out Fabio and that he would have stuck to the plan. Holly told Fabio that Sash was the biggest threat for jury votes and that she would have stuck to the alliance's plans to vote him out. At Tribal Council, the alliance of three continued their pitch to Fabio to keep them in the game. Ultimately, Fabio saw Holly as his biggest threat, and she was sent home. Chase, Fabio, and Sash woke up on day 39 and enjoyed the traditional breakfast. Before heading off to the final Tribal Council, the trio burned their camp site. At the final Tribal Council, Chase focused on being open with the jury about how he played the game. Fabio told the jury that he was always open with everybody, had not back stabbed anybody, and had earned his spot in the Final Three. Sash emphasized that he was remorseful about the alliances that he had broken but that the friendships he made were important to him. Chase was mocked by several members of the jury for his rash decisions. Chase and Sash charged Fabio with never knowing what was going on.
320	16	"Reunion"	6.1/11	3.0/8	December 19, 2010	11.19	#14
Months later, the votes were revealed as they were cast, Fabio won the title of Sole Survivor over Chase and Sash in a 5–4–0 vote. The castaways return to discuss the season with host, Jeff Probst.

== Voting history ==
	Original tribes				Switched tribes					Merged tribe								
Episode	1	2	3	4	5	6			7	8	9	10	12		13	14	15	
Day	3	6	8	11	14	15			18	22	24	27	28		32	36	37	38
Tribe	Espada	La Flor	Espada	Espada	Espada	La Flor		Espada	La Flor	Libertad	Libertad	Libertad	Libertad		Libertad	Libertad	Libertad	Libertad
Eliminated	Wendy	Shannon	Jimmy J.	Jimmy T.	Tyrone	Tie (Note: The first Tribal Council vote resulted in a tie. Per the rules, a second vote was held where the castaways involved in the tie would not vote and the remaining castaways could only vote for those who tied.)	Kelly B.	Yve	Jill	Alina	Marty	Brenda	NaOnka	Kelly S.	Benry	Jane	Dan	Holly
Vote	9–1	7–3	8–1	5–3	6–2	3–3–2	5–1	6–1	3–2–2	10–2	7–4	8–1–1	Quit (Note: No vote: NaOnka and Kelly S. chose to quit the game.)		4–2–1	5–0 (Note: Sash played a hidden immunity idol, therefore the one vote against him did not count.)	4–1	3–1
Voter	Vote																	
Fabio		Brenda				Kelly B.	Kelly B.		Marty	Alina	Jane	Brenda			Holly	Jane	Dan	Holly
Chase		Shannon			Tyrone			Yve		Alina	Marty	Brenda			Benry	Jane	Dan	Holly
Sash		Shannon				Marty	Kelly B.		Jill	Alina	Marty	Brenda			Benry	Jane	Dan	Holly
Holly	Wendy		Jimmy J.	Dan	Tyrone			Yve		Alina	Marty	Brenda			Benry	Jane	Dan	Sash
Dan	Wendy		Jimmy J.	Jimmy T.	Tyrone			Yve		Alina	Jane	Brenda			Fabio	Jane	Chase	
Jane	Wendy		Jimmy J.	Dan		Marty	Marty		Marty	Marty	Marty	Brenda			Benry	~~Sash~~		
Benry		Shannon			Tyrone			Yve		Alina	Jane	Brenda			Fabio			
Kelly S.		Shannon				Kelly B.	Kelly B.		Jill	Alina	Marty	Benry		Quit				
NaOnka		Shannon			Tyrone			Yve		Alina	Marty	Brenda	Quit					
Brenda		Shannon				Kelly B.	Kelly B.		Jill	Alina	Marty	NaOnka						
Marty	Wendy		Jimmy J.	Jimmy T.		Brenda	None (Note: This player was not eligible to vote in the second round of voting.)		Jane	Alina	Jane							
Alina		Brenda			Tyrone			Yve		Marty								
Jill	Wendy		Jimmy J.	Jimmy T.		Brenda	Kelly B.		Jane									
Yve	Wendy		Jimmy J.	Jimmy T.	NaOnka			Dan										
Kelly B.		Shannon				Marty	None											
Tyrone	Wendy		Jimmy J.	Jimmy T.	NaOnka													
Jimmy T.	Wendy		Jimmy J.	Dan														
Jimmy J.	Wendy		Dan															
Shannon		Brenda																
Wendy	Yve																	

Jury vote
Episode	16		
Day	39		
Finalist	Fabio	Chase	Sash
Votes	5–4–0		
Juror	Vote		
Holly		Yes	
Dan	Yes		
Jane		Yes	
Benry	Yes		
Kelly S.	Yes		
NaOnka	Yes		
Brenda		Yes	
Marty	Yes		
Alina		Yes	

== Production ==
=== Casting ===
Applications were due in January 2010, filming started from June and ended in July 2010. Nicaragua and the following season, Survivor: Redemption Island, were filmed near San Juan del Sur in Rivas Department on the Pacific coast of Nicaragua.[1][2][37]

=== Filming ===
This season's opening titles uses the original version of "Ancient Voices" — Survivor's opening theme song — first used for the debut Survivor season. Traditionally, each season features its own version of "Ancient Voices", using instruments and sounds meant to evoke that season's location or theme. One was created for Nicaragua but was not used, though the song was released onto iTunes on October 10. The reason for this omission has not been publicly disclosed. Survivor host Jeff Probst also announced that the Hidden Immunity Idol will continue to be used in the game. However, as idols had been found too easily in the past two seasons, the idol was hidden differently. The clues to the idols' locations were rebuses rather than text as in past seasons.

== Reception ==
Survivor: Nicaragua was heavily panned by critics and fans, and is often considered to be one of the worst seasons in the series. Survivor columnist Dalton Ross of Entertainment Weekly ranked Nicaragua as the second-worst season of the entire series, only better than Island of the Idols, for four reasons: "1) Splitting the tribes up by age and the Medallion of Power were both enormous flops. 2) Like One World, Thailand and Fiji, just too many unlikable players. 3) Two people quitting with only 11 days left. 4) No big memorable moments. Even Thailand had the fake merge and Fiji had the big Yau-Man/Dreamz free car deal gone bad, but what was Nicaragua's signature moment? Unfortunately, it was people quitting, and that was memorable for all the wrong reasons." This season was similarly ranked as the second-worst by Inside Survivor in 2020 due to underwhelming gameplay, pointless twists, and an unlikeable cast. Nicaragua was ranked as the worst season by fan site "The Purple Rock Podcast" in 2020, describing it as having "terrible casting, a terrible gimmick, and a terrible winner," combined to make "a truly horrendous Survivor viewing experience." In 2015, a poll by Rob Has a Podcast ranked rank 27th out of 30 with Rob Cesternino ranking it at number 23. This was updated in 2021 during Cesternino's podcast, Survivor All-Time Top 40 Rankings, ranking 34th. In 2024, Nick Caruso of TVLine ranked this season 45th out of 47. The gameplay of winner Jud "Fabio" Birza also received very negative reception. Birza placed last out of the first 34 winners in a fan poll conducted by Entertainment Weekly in 2017 and also received the most last-place and second-to-last-place votes out of every winner in the poll - by a wide margin.

When Jimmy Fallon, a longtime fan of the show interviewed Jeff Probst on Late Night with Jimmy Fallon, he said that he was disappointed with this season and called it a popularity contest. Probst felt that Nicaragua was boring, and was the motivating factor that led the producers and himself to add the "Redemption Island" twist for the following season (which would fare even worse than Nicaragua due in no small part to the twist). Nicaragua is ranked as the third-worst season of the series by Examiner.com (only ahead of Gabon and Fiji), and the fourth-worst season by The Wire (only ahead of Samoa, Gabon, and Redemption Island). In 2012, when Survivor fan site "Survivor Oz" held its first annual poll ranking every season of the series (up to that point), Nicaragua was ranked as the second-worst season of the series, only ahead of Redemption Island.

In the official issue of CBS Watch magazine commemorating the 15th anniversary of Survivor, Probst stated that Nicaragua's tribe division by age "is a division I hope we never do again," (however, 6 years later, Survivor: Millennials vs. Gen X saw a similar division) and also called the Medallion of Power "one of the worst named and most poorly executed twists we’ve ever come up with [and] embarrassing on all accounts."
