= Kelly Bruno =

American runner

Personal information
- Born: March 23, 1984 (age 42) Durham, North Carolina, U.S.
Medal record
Women's paratriathlon
Representing United States
World Championships
Gold medal – first place	2008 Vancouver	AWAD PC5

Dr. Kelly Bruno (born March 23, 1984) is a world-record holding amputee runner and athlete. She was a contestant on the 21st season of the television show Survivor.

== Biography ==
Kelly Bruno was six months old when she had her leg amputated below the knee due to a congenital deformity. She currently holds world records for amputees in the 200m and 800m distances, has won gold at the 2008 New York Triathlon and ITU World Triathlon Championships in the amputee division, and was the second amputee to finish the Ironman Kona Triathlon in Hawaii in 2007, setting the current record for the course in the process, In 2008, she was named a ball girl at the US Open—a first for an amputee. Her father, Dr. Richard Bruno, who was a teacher at Lynn University, was killed while overseeing an outreach mission in Haiti during the earthquake in January 2010. She also pursued a career in medicine. Dr. Bruno received her medical degree from the University of North Carolina, Chapel Hill where she also completed her residency in the Department of Anesthesiology. She currently is a Pain Research Fellow with CESAMH at the San Diego VA.

=== Survivor ===
In August 2010, it was announced that Kelly would be one of the contestants on Survivor: Nicaragua, the 21st season of American reality show Survivor. She was a member of the La Flor tribe, a tribe originally consisting of players aged 30 and under. When a tribe switch occurred in the season's fifth episode, she remained on La Flor. She was voted out during the season's sixth episode where she placed 15th.
