= Natalie Anderson =

Natalie Anderson may refer to:

- Natalie Anderson (actress) (born 1981), British actress
- Natalie Anderson (television personality) (born 1986), American reality show contestant

== See also ==
- Nathalie Anderson (born 1948), American poet
