= Survivor 47 =

Season of television series

- Season 47
- Presented by: Jeff Probst
- No. of days: 26
- No. of castaways: 18
- Winner: Rachel LaMont
- Runner-up: Sam Phalen
- Location: Mamanuca Islands, Fiji
- No. of episodes: 14

Release
- Original network: CBS
- Original release: September 18 – December 18, 2024

Additional information
- Filming dates: May 12 – June 6, 2024

Season chronology
- ← Previous; Survivor 46 Next → Survivor 48

Survivor 47 is the forty-seventh season of the American competitive reality television series Survivor. It premiered on September 18, 2024, on CBS in the United States, and is the fifteenth consecutive season to be filmed in the Mamanuca Islands in Fiji. The season ended on December 18, 2024, when Rachel LaMont was crowned the winner, defeating Sam Phalen and Sue Smey in a 7–1–0 vote. LaMont—who is Thai-American—became the fourth castaway of Asian descent to win, following Yul Kwon from Survivor: Cook Islands, Natalie Anderson from Survivor: San Juan del Sur, and Erika Casupanan from Survivor 41.

== Format ==
Survivor is a reality television show based on the Swedish show Expedition Robinson, created by Mark Burnett and Charlie Parsons. The series follows a number of participants isolated in a remote location, where they must provide food, fire, and shelter. One by one, a participant is removed from the series by majority vote, with challenges held to give a reward (ranging from living- and food-related prizes to a car) and immunity from being voted out of the series. The last remaining player receives a prize of $1,000,000.

== Contestants ==
Cast of Survivor 47. Eventual winner Rachel LaMont seen at the second left of the right group (Gata)

The 18 castaways competing on Survivor 47 were officially announced on September 4, 2024. Notable castaways this season include Rob Has a Podcast contributor Aysha Welch, Miss Delaware USA 2018 Sierra Wright, comedian and Pod Save America host Jon Lovett, WYPR radio personality Gabe Ortis, and Tennessee Titans reporter Sam Phalen.

Teeny Chirichillo, a nonbinary person at the time of competition, would come out as a transgender man in April 2025.

List of Survivor 47 contestants
Contestant	Age	From	Tribe			Finish	
Contestant	Age	From	Original	None	Merged	Placement	Day
Jon Lovett	41	Los Angeles, California	Gata			1st voted out	Day 3
Terran "TK" Foster	31	Upper Marlboro, Maryland	Tuku			2nd voted out	Day 5
Aysha Welch	32	Houston, Texas	Lavo			3rd voted out	Day 7
Kishan Patel	27	San Francisco, California	Lavo			4th voted out	Day 8
Anika Dhar	26	Los Angeles, California	Gata			5th voted out	Day 10
Jerome "Rome" Cooney	30	Phoenix, Arizona	Lavo	None (Note: At the start of the individual phase of the game on Day 11, players had to earn their way into the merged tribe by either winning immunity or surviving the Day 12 Tribal Council.)		6th voted out	Day 12
Tiyana Hallums	27	Aiea, Hawaii	Tuku	None	Beka	7th voted out	Day 13
Sierra Wright	26	Phoenixville, Pennsylvania	Gata	None	Beka	8th voted out 1st jury member	Day 15
Solomon "Sol" Yi	42	Norwalk, Connecticut	Lavo	None	Beka	9th voted out 2nd jury member	Day 16
Gabe Ortis	26	Baltimore, Maryland	Tuku	None	Beka	10th voted out 3rd jury member	Day 18
Kyle Ostwald	31	Cheboygan, Michigan	Tuku	None	Beka	11th voted out 4th jury member	Day 20
Caroline Vidmar	27	Chicago, Illinois	Tuku	None	Beka	12th voted out 5th jury member	Day 22
Andy Rueda	31	Brooklyn, New York	Gata	None	Beka	13th voted out 6th jury member	Day 23
Genevieve Mushaluk	32	Winnipeg, Manitoba	Lavo	None	Beka	14th voted out 7th jury member	Day 24
Christine "Teeny" Chirichillo	23	Manahawkin, New Jersey	Lavo	None	Beka	Eliminated; 8th jury member	Day 25
Sue Smey	58	Putnam Valley, New York	Tuku	None	Beka	2nd runner-up	Day 26
Sam Phalen	24	Nashville, Tennessee	Gata	None	Beka	Runner-up	Day 26
Rachel LaMont	34	Southfield, Michigan	Gata	None	Beka	Sole Survivor	Day 26

=== Future appearances ===
Genevieve Mushaluk returned to compete on Survivor 50: In the Hands of the Fans.

Outside of Survivor, Sue Smey competed on Beast Games: Strong vs. Smart.

== Season summary ==
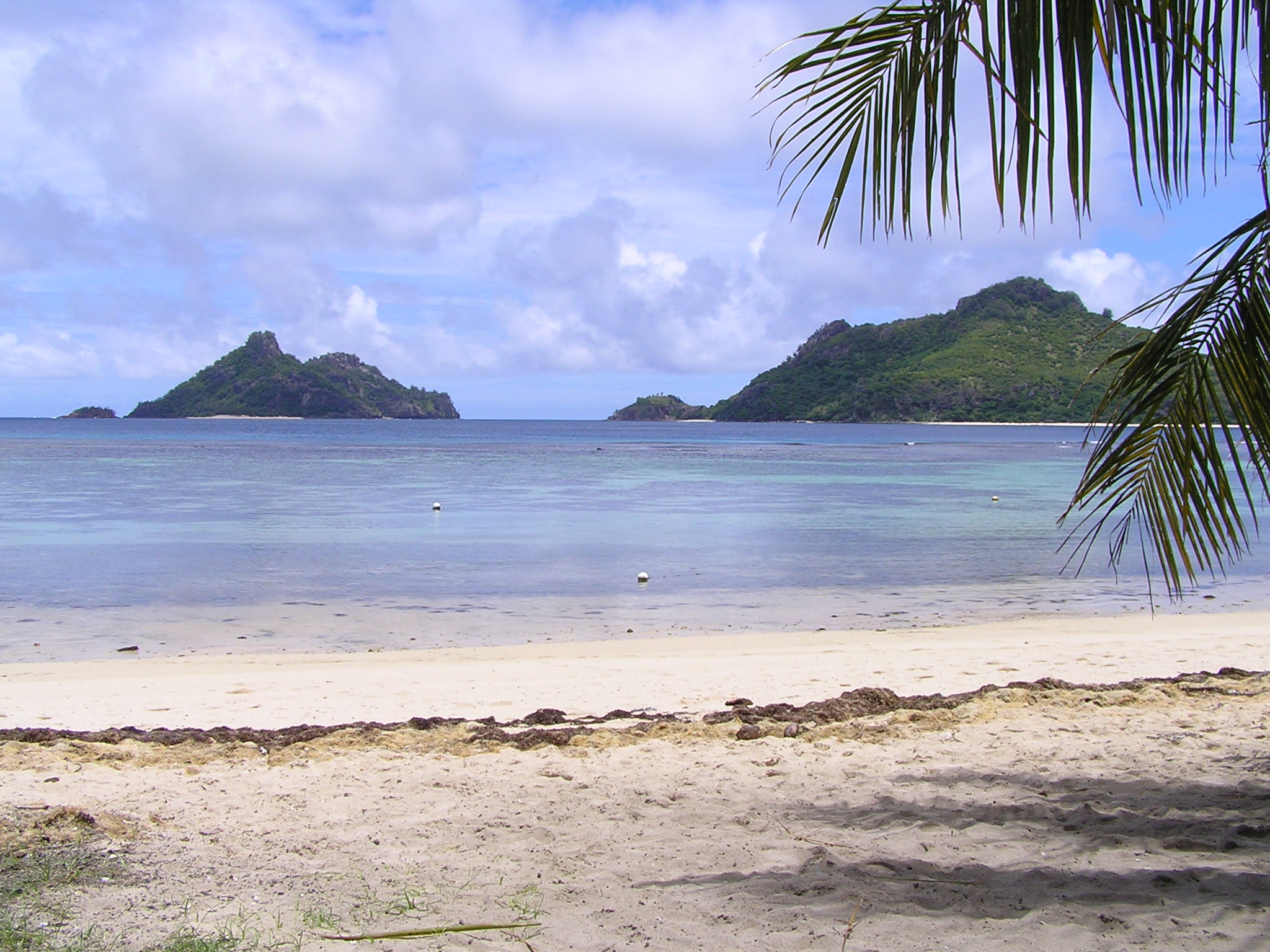
The season filmed in the Mamanuca Islands of Fiji.

Eighteen castaways were divided into three tribes: Gata, Lavo, and Tuku. Tuku dominated early with Gabe, Sue, and Caroline forming a strong alliance. On Gata, Sierra became the swing vote between a women’s alliance and Sam, opting to side with Sam. Meanwhile, Lavo was divided due to a feud between Rome and Sol, but Genevieve united the tribe to blindside Kishan.

At the merge, Tuku’s alliance initially held the numbers but lost power after Gabe’s elimination. The tribe soon split into two factions: the "underdogs" and the "threats", the latter of which consisted of Sam, Genevieve, and Kyle. At the final seven, Andy shook up the game by flipping on the "underdogs" and blindsiding Caroline. Rachel, on the chopping block, survived by winning multiple immunity challenges and using an idol to take out Andy. She secured her spot in the final three alongside Sue after claiming final immunity (and thereby tying the all-time record for most individual immunities won by a woman, with four total), while Sam narrowly defeated Teeny in fire-making.

At the Final Tribal Council, Sue was largely ignored by the jury. Sam argued that Rachel coasted on immunity wins, while he fought harder for his survival. Rachel highlighted her challenge victories, strategic gameplay, and strong social connections throughout the game. Ultimately, the jury recognized Rachel's dominance, awarding her the title of Sole Survivor in a 7–1–0 vote over Sam and Sue.

Survivor 47 season summary
Episode			Challenge winner(s)		Journey	Eliminated	
No.	Title	Air date	Reward	Immunity	Journey	Tribe	Player
1	"One Glorious and Perfect Episode"	September 18, 2024	Gata	None	None	Gata	Jon
1	"One Glorious and Perfect Episode"	September 18, 2024	Lavo		None	Gata	Jon
1	"One Glorious and Perfect Episode"	September 18, 2024	Tuku		None	Gata	Jon
2	"Epic Boss Girl Move"	September 25, 2024	Gata		None	Tuku	TK
2	"Epic Boss Girl Move"	September 25, 2024	Lavo		None	Tuku	TK
3	"Belly of the Beast"	October 2, 2024	Gata		Anika (Gata)	Lavo	Aysha
3	"Belly of the Beast"	October 2, 2024	Gata		Kyle (Tuku)	Lavo	Aysha
3	"Belly of the Beast"	October 2, 2024	Tuku		Rome (Lavo)	Lavo	Aysha
4	"Is That Blood in Your Hair?"	October 9, 2024	Gata		Andy (Gata)	Lavo	Kishan
4	"Is That Blood in Your Hair?"	October 9, 2024	Gata		Caroline (Tuku)	Lavo	Kishan
4	"Is That Blood in Your Hair?"	October 9, 2024	Tuku		Teeny (Lavo)	Lavo	Kishan
5	"The Scales Be Tippin"	October 16, 2024	Caroline, Kyle, Rachel, Sam, Sue, Teeny, Tiyana	Tuku	None	Gata	Anika
5	"The Scales Be Tippin"	October 16, 2024	Caroline, Kyle, Rachel, Sam, Sue, Teeny, Tiyana	Lavo	None	Gata	Anika
6	"Feel the FOMO"	October 23, 2024	Kyle, Rachel, Sam, Sierra, Sue, Teeny [Genevieve] (Note: After finding an advantage on Day 11, Genevieve was automatically given reward and the chance to compete for immunity.)	Kyle	None	None	Rome
7	"Our Pickle on Blast"	October 30, 2024	Genevieve, Teeny [Andy, Sam, Sierra, Sol]		None	Beka	Tiyana
7	"Our Pickle on Blast"	October 30, 2024		Kyle	None	Beka	Tiyana
8	"He's All That"	November 6, 2024	Survivor Auction	Kyle	None	Beka	Sierra
8	"He's All That"	November 6, 2024	Survivor Auction	Sue	None	Beka	Sierra
9	"Nightmare Fuel"	November 13, 2024	Gabe, Kyle, Sol, Teeny	Gabe	Andy, Caroline, Rachel, Sam	Beka	Sol
10	"Loyal to the Soil"	November 20, 2024	Kyle, Rachel, Sam	Kyle	None	Beka	Gabe
11	"Flipping the Win Switch"	November 27, 2024	None	Rachel	Rachel	Beka	Kyle
12	"Operation: Italy"	December 4, 2024	Sam [Andy, Genevieve]	Rachel	None	Beka	Caroline
13	"Bob and Weave"	December 11, 2024	Genevieve [Sue, Teeny] (Note: In addition to immunity, Genevieve won reward for herself and two other castaways of her choice; she chose Sue and Teeny.)	Genevieve	None	Beka	Andy
13	"Bob and Weave"	December 11, 2024	None	Rachel	None	Beka	Genevieve
14	"The Last Stand"	December 18, 2024	None	Rachel (Note: For winning the final Immunity Challenge, Rachel had to assign additional immunity to another player, with the remaining two competing in a fire-making challenge to determine the third finalist; she gave additional immunity to Sue.) [Sue]	None	Beka	Teeny

== Episodes ==
No. overall	No. in season	Title	Rating/share (18–49)	Original release date	U.S. viewers (millions)
675	1	"One Glorious and Perfect Episode"	0.7/10	September 18, 2024	4.72
The 18 new castaways began their adventure.: Marooning Challenge: Tribes had to race out into the jungle, two members at a time, to retrieve heavy puzzle pieces. They then worked together to assemble a 3D puzzle. The first tribe to solve their puzzle won a pot, machete, and flint.; Gata won the challenge. Aysha from Lavo and TK from Tuku were appointed to earn supplies a different way.: Supply Challenge:, Transported to Monu Island, Aysha and TK had to find four keys scattered across the island. The keys opened a crate that held the supplies. TK earned the supplies for Tuku.; At Gata, Andy's strong attempts to bond with Jon and Rachel were met with skepticism, leaving him feeling alienated, while Jon worried about the age gap between himself and the rest of the tribe. At Lavo, Rome immediately searched for an advantage, but the time away from his tribemates aroused suspicion, though he was able to find the Beware Advantage clue. At Tuku, Gabe likewise found a Beware Advantage and, despite being caught by TK, followed the clues to an idol good for his next three Tribal Councils. He also approached Sue for an alliance, and she in turn bonded with Caroline.: Reward/Immunity Challenge: Tribes paddled a boat to shore, collecting three heavy chests along the way. They then pushed their chests across a track and used the puzzle pieces inside to assemble a large Survivor logo puzzle. The first two tribes to finish won immunity, plus a large shelter-building kit for first place and a smaller toolkit for second place, while the losing tribe had to forfeit their flint.; Lavo cruised to first place and Tuku placed second. Andy needed medical for heat exhaustion, then had a paranoia-induced meltdown. This made him an obvious candidate for elimination, but Jon targeted Anika, wanting to make a bigger move. He relayed this to Sam, who felt threatened by Jon's strategic chops. The women debated if Andy's physical advantage over Jon outweighed his erratic personality. At Tribal Council, the vote went unanimously against Jon, and he became the first person voted out.
676	2	"Epic Boss Girl Move"	0.7/9	September 25, 2024	4.47
At Gata, the tribe made a point of coddling Andy to stop him searching for an idol. Accidentally left alone, Andy found the Beware Advantage but chose to leave it. A worried Sam and Anika found it on their own; Sam waited to dig up the idol box with Sierra and kept the idol good for only one Tribal Council. Realizing the Advantage was gone, a panicking Andy confided in Sam, who let him think one of the women had found it. Sierra was surprised by Sam's wanting to keep Andy around, but kept silent. At Lavo, Rome's arrogance got on his tribe's nerves, particularly Sol's. Rome found the Beware Advantage and shared with Teeny, who divulged it to Kishan. Rome caught them holding the idol box, but Teeny managed to talk his (Note: Teeny came out as a trans man on April 9, 2025. Pronouns throughout this article have been changed to reflect this.) way out and Rome kept the idol good for a single Tribal Council. At Tuku, TK aligned with Kyle and Tiyana, but earned Sue's ire for talking nonstop while she was trying to nap on the beach.: Reward/Immunity Challenge: Tribes had to work together to bring a heavy bag of rice from an ocean platform to a locked gate on the beach. One tribe member had to maneuver the key through a blind maze, then cut open the bag of rice to retrieve a ball. Three tribe members then worked together to get the ball across a snake-shaped track. The first two tribes to land their ball in the target won immunity, plus a large fishing kit for first place and a smaller fishing kit for second place, while the losing tribe had to forfeit their flint.; Gata and Lavo won the challenge, though Rachel was caught pocketing some of the rice. TK's vocal disgust with Tuku's attitude regarding losing struck a nerve with Tiyana and Sue, and Gabe recruited Sue and Caroline to blindside TK. Despite her anger, Tiyana was conflicted as this would mean endangering her relationship with Kyle, but at Tribal Council, she joined Caroline, Gabe, and Sue in voting out TK, while Gabe wasted his idol on himself.
677	3	"Belly of the Beast"	0.6/8	October 2, 2024	4.34
Gabe attempted to turn Kyle against Tiyana, leaving him uneasy; he told the girls that Gabe planned to take Sue and Caroline to the end as goats, but Sue, furious at Kyle for voting against her, ignored him. At Gata, Sam and Anika clashed over shelter improvements, and Andy loaned his Shot in the Dark to Sierra to build trust and a majority. At Lavo, Rome caught fish but, feeling unappreciated, ate most of them himself, to the tribe's chagrin.: Journey: Anika, Kyle, and Rome went on a journey where they all divulged tribe dynamics. Each had to take a 1-in-3 chance for an advantage with two scrolls saying "lose your vote"; Kyle and Anika each lost one vote and chose not to risk further, but Rome won a steal-a-vote.; Reward/Immunity Challenge: One tribe member climbed two high obstacles in the ocean and dove down to release a key from a buoy before crossing a balance beam. The two remaining pairs ran the same course, and each retrieved one of the two remaining buoys from the balance beam. The keys unlocked puzzle pieces to a large vertical seahorse puzzle. The first two tribes to complete the puzzle won immunity, plus a large tarp and two hammocks for first place and a smaller tarp for second place, while the losing tribe had to forfeit their flint.; Gata and Tuku won the challenge. Teeny and Kishan found themselves stuck between the pairings of Genevieve & Rome and Aysha & Sol. Aysha's refusal to vote for anyone other than Genevieve convinced Teeny and Kishan to turn against her. At Tribal Council, Rome played his idol to negate one vote, and Aysha was voted out.
678	4	"Is That Blood in Your Hair"	0.7/7	October 9, 2024	4.14
With Sol on the bottom of Lavo, Rome considered using his steal-a-vote to cancel out Sol's Shot in the Dark. He later followed Sol around camp to prevent him from searching for an idol, much to the latter's chagrin. At Gata, Sierra was caught between the alliances of Anika & Rachel and Andy & Sam, although Andy's clumsiness continued to annoy her. At Tuku, Sue found an idol but the resulting mess of red paint made Tiyana and Caroline suspicious.: Reward/Immunity Challenge: Tribemates worked together to push a heavy cube down a path, and one person climbed the cube to retrieve bags. One person then assembled a hollow square and tossed the bags through onto a barrel. Two tribemates then assembled a vertical flame-shaped puzzle. The first two tribes to finish won immunity, plus three egg-laying hens for first place and six eggs for second place, while the losing tribe had to forfeit their flint.; Despite a huge early lead, Lavo completely failed the puzzle and lost the challenge.: Journey: Andy, Caroline, and Teeny were chosen for a journey, where they had to agree within a time limit on one person sacrificing their vote to earn a shared advantage; otherwise, all three would lose their vote. Teeny did so, and the three earned an amulet idol, which could only be used when all three were part of the same tribe.; At Lavo, Rome threatened Sol: give up his Shot in the Dark or Rome would use his steal-a-vote against Sol and vote him out; Sol refused to be threatened. However, Genevieve learned that Kishan had thrown her name out as a decoy to Rome, hoping to vote him out instead, and convinced Rome and Sol to form a temporary truce. At Tribal Council, Rome stole Kishan's vote, and Genevieve, Rome, and Sol joined forces to blindside Kishan, much to Teeny's shock.
679	5	"The Scales Be Tippin"	0.6/7	October 16, 2024	4.02
Rome expressed his distrust of Teeny, knowing he'd kept quiet about Kishan’s attempt to blindside him.: Reward Challenge: Randomly divided into two cross-tribal teams of seven, teammates worked together to free a ladder and take it across an obstacle course. One person climbed the ladder held by their teammates and freed bags containing balls that one player at a time had to shoot into five targets. The first team to finish won an afternoon at the Survivor Social Hour with hot dogs and soda, allowing them to form new bonds and gain information about the other tribes.; Caroline, Kyle, Rachel, Sam, Sue, Teeny, and Tiyana won the challenge. While on reward, Tiyana sowed suspicion about Gabe amongst the other tribes, while Sam denied he and Sierra were in an alliance. At Lavo, Rome approached Sol and Genevieve separately to suggest voting out Teeny; however, he told each conflicting stories which they later compared. Genevieve realized Rome's messy scheming was starting to outweigh his value as an ally, and when Teeny returned, he admitted to wanting Rome gone. At Gata, a hungry Andy, Anika, and Sierra set the chickens loose and made a futile attempt at fishing. At Tuku, Sue told Gabe that Tiyana threw him under the bus. Wanting to hold the tribe together, Caroline urged Tiyana to confess, but Gabe knew she hadn't told him the whole truth and vowed to see her voted off.: Immunity Challenge: One tribe member used a long-handled saw to cut a high rope and free sandbags and coconuts to place in a net. They then dragged the heavy sandbag and coconut-laden net across a course, picking up more coconuts along the way. Upon reaching their final mat, they emptied the net and tossed the sandbags at a puzzle to knock it down. Once the puzzle was completely off the table, tribes raced to put it back together. The first two tribes to finish won immunity, while the losing tribe had to forfeit their flint.; Beforehand, Gata proposed trading their chickens to Jeff for 24 eggs, who negotiated them down to 18. Tuku cruised to first place and Lavo barely came in second, regaining their flint for the first time in days. Despite his frustration with Andy's poor performance during challenges, Sam targeted Anika; Sierra was conflicted, knowing that keeping Andy benefited Sam more than her. Meanwhile, Anika and Rachel targeted Andy (despite Anika losing her vote on the last journey), but he anticipated their attempt to trick him into voting for Sam. At Tribal Council, all except Rachel blindsided a stunned Anika, and Sam chose to let his immunity idol expire rather than reveal it to Andy.
680	6	"Feel the FOMO"	0.6/8	October 23, 2024	4.35
On Day 11, the three tribes began the individual stage of the game at Tuku's beach and castaways were tasked with finding an advantage in the upcoming challenge, which Genevieve found attached to a buoy. Rome goaded Kyle into revealing which tribemates he considered threats, then told them exaggerated versions of what Kyle had said. A skeptical Tiyana spoke with Sol, who urged everyone to fact-check, and Kyle emphatically targeted Rome once it circled back to him, with most castaways following suit.: Reward/Immunity Challenge: Divided into two teams of six via schoolyard pick, castaways ran a course and two would maneuver a ball through a table maze. The first team to land their ball in the center target won a food reward as well as the chance to compete for individual immunity. For immunity, castaways had to balance on a beam while keeping a ball on a curved bow; if a player or ball dropped, they were out. The last one standing won immunity.; Genevieve's advantage granted her the ability to bypass the team portion of the immunity challenge, start directly in the individual portion, and be part of the reward. Kyle, Rachel, Sam, Sierra, Sue, and Teeny won reward; Kyle also won individual immunity. At reward, Sue suggested targeting Andy as a backup in case Rome played an idol, which Sam reluctantly agreed to. With his initial target of Kyle foiled, Rome planted seeds to get Sol out by depicting him as a bully. Though he felt confident Sol would go, the others knew Rome was untrustworthy. Sam mentioned the backup plan to Sol, who agreed to throw his vote at Andy. At Tribal Council, Jeff humored Rome by letting him take his seat and explain why the amulet was a bad advantage. Andy, Caroline, and Teeny used their amulets on Teeny, and most of the tribe voted out a dumbfounded Rome. Afterwards, the remaining 12 castaways were officially merged.
681	7	"Our Pickle on Blast"	0.6/6	October 30, 2024	4.24
Sol informed a rattled Andy that Sam had discussed using him as the decoy vote, and Andy aligned with Genevieve, mulling turning against Gata. Before the next challenge began, Jeff announced a twist: despite the tribes being merged, the next person to be eliminated would not serve on the jury.: Reward/Immunity Challenge: Divided into two teams of six via random draw, castaways held a long pole over their heads to balance a ball on a small disc while balancing themselves on a beam. At regular intervals, castaways moved further down the beam to narrower sections. If they fell off or their ball dropped, they were eliminated. The last person left standing overall won a food reward as well as group immunity, but would not vote at Tribal Council. The last person left standing from the losing group won individual immunity.; The entire Tuku tribe plus Rachel made up one group, while the Lavo three and the rest of Gata made up the other group. Kyle won immunity but was unable to outlast Genevieve and Teeny from the other group. While enjoying reward, Andy and Sol surmised an advantage would be hidden; Sol found it and discovered he could give someone from the other group either a vote blocker or safety without power. Knowing she was the obvious target, Rachel pled her case to the old Tuku members, some of whom were ready to turn on each other (Tiyana and Gabe especially). At Tribal Council, Rachel played the safety without power that Sol had anonymously gifted her; Sol feigned shock to keep from being exposed. Following some last-minute strategizing, a devastated Tiyana was voted out.
682	8	"He's All That"	0.7/8	November 6, 2024	4.64
Sol privately told Rachel he gave her the safety without power, and they aligned. The next morning, everyone was tasked with finding bamboo tubes containing money for the upcoming auction; Andy wound up with zero tubes. An item Rachel bought included a note, and Sam lost his vote due to having the most money left at the end of the auction. Rachel's note was a clue to an idol hidden in the shelter's tarp; she was able to retrieve it without being caught. Gata and Lavo agreed to align against Tuku, but Caroline tried to turn Lavo against Gata instead, believing the Gata members to be more dangerous.: Immunity Challenge: Castaways held on to a bar attached to an overhead bucket containing 25% of their pre-game body weight. If their bucket dropped, they were out. The last man and woman left standing each won immunity.; Sue won immunity for the women, and Kyle won his third straight necklace for the men. Lavo ultimately sided with Tuku but were undecided on who to vote out. Sol tried to save Rachel and break up the stronger pair of Sam and Sierra; Andy sided with the majority, feeling like the Gata members had been taking him for granted. At Tribal Council, Rachel played her Shot in the Dark, which was unsuccessful, and the vote was tied between Sam and Sierra. Since Sam already lost his vote, Sierra could vote in the tiebreaker but only for Sam; ultimately, Sierra was sent to the jury by everyone else that could vote.
683	9	"Nightmare Fuel"	0.7/9	November 13, 2024	4.43
Despite being left out of the plan against Sierra, Rachel tried to mend fences with Andy, while Sam discussed a blindside on Gabe along with the Lavo three.: Reward/Immunity Challenge: Contestants formed five pairs prior to the challenge. The pairs consisted of Sol & Teeny, Kyle & Gabe, Rachel & Caroline, Andy & Sam, and Sue & Genevieve. The challenge consisted of three stages. In the first stage, contestants had to crawl one at a time through a low sand-filled tunnel collecting a plank along the way. After both partners completed the tunnel and got to their mat, they dug up a second plank from a sand circle. The first three pairs to complete this stage advanced. Andy, Sam, Rachel, and Caroline were eliminated. In the second stage, pairs worked together to place planks one at a time to complete a puzzle staircase. At the top, they crossed a three-tier balance beam and slid down a ramp. The first two pairs to complete this stage advanced to the final stage and won a food reward at camp. Sue and Genevieve were eliminated leaving Teeny, Sol, Kyle, and Gabe to move on. In the final stage, contestants stood in a box with four levels of decreasingly narrow ledges on each side on which they would stand, starting at the top level. When instructed by Jeff, they would step down to the next lower level. Upon reaching the bottom level, they would stay there until only one remained.; Gabe ultimately outlasted Kyle to win immunity.: Journey: Following the challenge, Sam, Rachel, Caroline, and Andy, the first two pairs eliminated from the challenge, were sent on a journey. The four had lost their vote in the challenge but three of them could win back their vote in a game. Each of the four took turns stacking wooden cards in the form of a triangular tower until the tower fell. The person whose card caused the tower to fall did not win back their vote; Caroline brought down the tower.; Back at camp, Teeny, Gabe, Kyle, and Sol enjoyed a feast of BLT sandwiches and beverages. Genevieve and Sue could not partake in the reward, thus leaving them to sit back at camp and strategize together. Genevieve worked on convincing tribemates to blindside Sol, while the Gata and Lavo members tried to turn the vote onto Sue, perceiving her as the glue holding Tuku together. Genevieve told Rachel about the plan, who told Sam, who in turn told Sol. Sol told Teeny and Genevieve that they needed to follow Sam's plan to target Sue, but Teeny thought Kyle would be a better target, causing the target to flip from Sue to him. At Tribal Council, the paranoia and confusion surrounding whether to vote out Sol, Sue, or Kyle led to a live tribal, where a unanimous vote sent Sol to the jury.
684	10	"Loyal to the Soil"	0.7/9	November 20, 2024	4.42
Expecting fallout from orchestrating Sol's elimination, Genevieve was still upset when an emotional Teeny suggested any alliance between them was broken. Tired of feeling betrayed and disregarded by the other castaways, Teeny vowed to avenge Sol. Rachel, angry with Sam for informing Sol about the plan after she asked him not to, was told by a scheming Andy that Genevieve considered her a threat.: Reward Challenge: Randomly divided into three teams of three, and with their legs bound together and their hands bound at the waist, they took turns slithering their way over two sand humps pushing a ball ahead of them using only their head. Once all three teammates made it to their mat, they unbound their limbs and, taking turns, rolled a ball across a table and up an incline trying to land it in a hole. The first team to land all three balls in the hole won a food reward of wraps, veggies, juices and more at the Survivor Sanctuary.; Kyle, Rachel, and Sam won reward. Privately, Rachel and Sam debated who to target; Rachel was keen to oust Genevieve, but Sam hoped to blindside Gabe due to his status as Tuku's strategic leader and their numbers advantage. Kyle also preferred Gabe, who he correctly suspected was coming after him. Back at camp, Andy tried to deepen the wedge between Sue and Kyle by claiming that Kyle had disparaging nicknames for her and Caroline.: Immunity Challenge: Contestants stood on a narrow wooden perch while balancing a ball on a wooden disk. At intervals, additional balls were added. Contestants were eliminated if they fell off the beam or dropped a ball. The last one remaining won immunity.; Prior to the challenge, Jeff offered a bag of rice if four contestants would sit out the challenge. Caroline offered two Shots in the Dark, which Jeff refused, but he was then surprised when Kyle offered all remaining Shots in the Dark. Gabe talked a reluctant Sam into agreeing after everyone else (except Rachel, who already used hers) did so. Kyle won his fourth immunity necklace, thwarting Sue's plan to oust him. The vote came down to Gabe or Genevieve for their status as threats, and Caroline mulled turning against her day one ally, knowing it meant endangering her relationship with Sue. At Tribal Council, all but Sue sent Gabe to the jury.
685	11	"Flipping the Win Switch"	0.7/9	November 27, 2024	4.50
Although angered by Gabe's elimination, Sue reconciled with Caroline, and they aligned with Andy, Rachel, and Teeny. A boat arrived at camp for one person to go on a journey; Rachel ultimately drew the rock.: Journey: Rachel was tasked with rearranging five columns of mixed colored balls so each column only contained one color, thus releasing an advantage reward, before it was pulled into the ocean by weights she had to release. If she failed, she lost her vote, but she was able to complete it in the nick of time; the advantage allowed her to anonymously block a vote and was good until the final six.; Rachel told everyone she lost her vote but later admitted the truth to Sue and Caroline.: Immunity Challenge: Castaways used a rope to balance a wobbly table while walking back and forth to retrieve lettered tiles that they then stacked on the wobbly table to spell the word immunity. If the tiles fell off the table, they had to start over. The first person to successfully finish won immunity.; Rachel narrowly won immunity over Kyle. At camp, Sam tried to turn the vote toward a less-obvious candidate, while Andy and Rachel argued for Genevieve, perceiving her as a huge social threat whereas Kyle only had his ability to win challenges. Sue and Caroline, however, refused to consider anyone other than Kyle, and Teeny also advocated for this. At Tribal Council, everyone except Andy sent Kyle to the jury.
686	12	"Operation: Italy"	0.7/9	December 4, 2024	4.60
Concerned she was too visible after masterminding Kyle's elimination, Genevieve tried to turn Teeny against Rachel by suggesting she would vote for Rachel in the end over Teeny. This backfired when Teeny, interpreting it as a threat, informed Rachel that Sam and Genevieve were targeting her.: Reward Challenge: Contestants raced through a series of obstacles and retrieved a ball from a net tunnel. They then retrieved a second ball and crawled under a net pushing the balls ahead of them to the finish where they had to land both balls on a high perch. The first to accomplish this won a reward of Italian food and letters from home at the Survivor Sanctuary.; Sam won reward and chose Andy and Genevieve to join him. Teeny was livid over his choices, and the four players at camp aligned with the intention to target Sam immediately. On reward, Andy proposed a plan titled "Operation: Italy" to convince the underdog alliance to split the vote so that he would join Sam and Genevieve in blindsiding Rachel. Genevieve crafted a fake idol and briefly showed Teeny as part of this plan.: Immunity Challenge: Contestants had to navigate a balance beam while transporting a ball on top of a pole. They then had to maneuver two skulls through a metal maze. Finally, they rolled balls one at a time onto a paddle where they had to land three of them in targets on the paddle. The first to finish won immunity.; Rachel easily won immunity, forcing Andy to switch the target to Caroline. Meanwhile, Teeny tried to convince the majority to not split the vote, distrustful of Genevieve's "idol". Sue mulled playing her idol for Caroline while Rachel considered playing her advantages. At Tribal Council, no advantages were played and Operation: Italy came to fruition, sending Caroline to the jury and shocking Rachel, Sue, and Teeny.
687	13	"Bob and Weave"	0.7/9	December 11, 2024	4.89
Left in the dark about a vote yet again, Teeny told Andy, Sam, and Genevieve that Rachel had a vote blocker, not knowing that Rachel was eavesdropping on the conversation. The next morning, Sue looked for a new idol but Rachel told her she had found one after the auction; Sue did not admit to already having an idol but, furious with Andy for forcing Caroline out, was keen to align with Rachel.: Reward/Immunity Challenge: Contestants leapt into the water and swam to a platform where they had to maneuver a buoy along a rope through a series of obstacles. When complete, they then climbed over the obstacle and back into the water where they moved their buoy over and under water obstacles before moving to a platform. Once at the platform, they had to complete a Survivor logo jigsaw puzzle. The winner got immunity and a trip to the Survivor Sanctuary with steak, baked potatoes, wine, juice, and cheesecake.; Genevieve won and shared reward with Sue and Teeny. As soon as they sat down, Genevieve proposed voting out Rachel; back at camp, Sam and Andy came to the same decision. Confident that Rachel would be eliminated, Andy asked her to consider voting for him in the final three, knowing the jury didn't take him seriously as a social player. This only convinced Rachel that Andy was a bigger threat than she realized and shifted her target away from Sam. At Tribal Council, Rachel played her immunity idol, and Sue joined her in sending Andy to the jury (to the visible delight of the jury members). Rachel and Genevieve were set to go head-to-head as the biggest targets, causing the remaining three to feel as if they were being written off prematurely.: Immunity Challenge: Contestants sprinted up from the ocean to the beach where they had to dig through a wall of sand under an obstacle. Once through the sand obstacle, they alternately picked up balls and stands from a table which they then stacked on a post while standing on a teetering balance beam. The first to finish won immunity.; Rachel won immunity for the third time, securing her place in the final four. To save himself, Sam admitted that Genevieve’s idol was fake. However, even after Genevieve confirmed it to Teeny, he, Rachel, and Sue remained cautious. At Tribal Council, Rachel convinced an indecisive Teeny to vote for Sam as a backup. Sue played her expiring idol on herself, and she, Sam, and Rachel sent Genevieve to the jury.
688	14	"The Last Stand"	0.8/11	December 18, 2024	5.03
Immunity Challenge: Contestants began by crawling through a muddy pit beneath a net. After emerging, they untied a pole, which they used to unravel a rope. They then used the rope to lower a gate. Once through, they retrieved letter tiles to solve a combination lock, unlocking a machete. The machete was used to cut a rope, releasing a ladder. After climbing the ladder, they reached a platform where they had to complete a hanging bat puzzle. The first to finish the puzzle won immunity.; Rachel won her fourth immunity challenge. Back at camp, Rachel rewarded Sue's loyalty by promising to take her to the Final Tribal Council, sending Sam and Teeny to the fire-making challenge. Teeny was coached by Rachel, while Sam, who had never successfully made a fire all season, admitted he was struggling and had no idea what he was doing.: Fire Making Challenge: Teeny started his fire first, building it slowly. However, Sam eventually got his fire started and quickly built it up. With the wind helping Sam's fire grow while pushing Teeny's flame away, his fire burned through the rope first, sending Teeny to the jury.; At the Final Tribal Council, Sue received little attention but was praised for her loyalty. Sam argued that Rachel had coasted on immunity wins and advantages, while he had survived multiple attempts to vote him out, using creative gameplay to fight from the bottom. Rachel countered that she had earned her place through challenge wins, strategic moves like her savvy use of an idol, and building genuine alliances with others. She emphasized that she had been targeted since the merge and had to constantly adapt to stay in the game. In the end, the jury sided with Rachel for her stronger all-around game, naming her the Sole Survivor in a 7–1–0 vote over Sam and Sue; Sam received Kyle's vote.

== Voting history ==
Survivor 47 voting history
	Original tribes						No tribes	Merged tribe									
Episode	1	2	3	4		5	6	7	8		9	10	11	12	13		14
Day	3	5	7	8		10	12	13	15		16	18	20	22	23	24	25
Tribe	Gata	Tuku	Lavo	Lavo		Gata	None	Beka	Beka		Beka	Beka	Beka	Beka	Beka	Beka	Beka
Eliminated	Jon	TK	Aysha	Kishan		Anika	Rome	Tiyana	Tie (Note: The vote resulted in a tie. Per the rules, a second vote was held. As one of the castaways involved in the tie had lost voting privileges, all the remaining castaways with votes were eligible to vote for those players who tied.)	Sierra	Sol	Gabe	Kyle	Caroline	Andy	Genevieve	Teeny
Votes	5–1	4–2	3–1–1–0 (Note: Rome played a hidden immunity idol on himself; therefore, one vote against him was not counted.)	4–0		3–1	9–2–1	4–1	4–4–1	8–1	8–1	7–2	6–1–1	3–2–2	2–0 (Note: Rachel played a hidden immunity idol on herself; therefore, three votes against her were not counted.)	3–2	None (Note: For winning the final Immunity Challenge, Rachel had to assign additional immunity to another player, with the remaining two competing in a fire-making challenge to determine the third finalist; she gave additional immunity to Sue, and Sam defeated Teeny in the fire-making challenge.)
Voter	Vote																Challenge
Rachel	Jon					Andy	Rome	Immune (Note: Sol anonymously sent Rachel the "take your pick" advantage, in which she played the "safety without power" option. This allowed her to leave Tribal Council; she could not vote, but also could not be voted against at this Tribal Council.)	None (Note: This player played the Shot in the Dark, and as a result, had to sacrifice that night's vote.)		Sol	Gabe	Kyle	Genevieve	Andy	Genevieve	Immune
Sam	Jon					Anika	Rome	Immune (Note: The players who won immunity on Day 13 were not eligible to vote at that night's Tribal Council.)	None (Note: Sam lost his vote at Tribal Council due to having the most money at the end of the Survivor Auction.)		Sol	Gabe	Kyle	Caroline	None (Note: This player lost their vote as another player used a block a vote advantage.)	Genevieve	Won
Sue		TK					Andy	Tiyana	Sierra	Sierra	Sol	Genevieve	Kyle	Sam	Andy	Genevieve	Saved
Teeny			Sol	None (Note: This player lost a vote attempting to gain an advantage.)			Rome	Immune	Sam	Sierra	Sol	Gabe	Kyle	Sam	~~Rachel~~	Sam	Lost
Genevieve			Aysha	Kishan			Rome	Immune	Sam	Sierra	Sol	Gabe	Kyle	Caroline	~~Rachel~~	Sam	
Andy	Jon					Anika	Rome	Immune	Sam	Sierra	Sol	Gabe	Genevieve	Caroline	~~Rachel~~		
Caroline		TK					Rome	Tiyana	Sierra	Sierra	None (Note: For coming last in the immunity challenge, Andy, Caroline, Rachel, and Sam lost their votes. However, Andy, Rachel, and Sam regained theirs.)	Gabe	Kyle	Genevieve			
Kyle		Sue					None	Tiyana	Sierra	Sierra	Sol	Gabe	Teeny				
Gabe		TK					Rome	Tiyana	Sierra	Sierra	Sol	Genevieve					
Sol			~~Rome~~	Kishan			Andy	Immune	Sam	Sierra	Sue						
Sierra	Jon					Anika	Rome	Immune	Gabe	Sam (Note: Per the rules, if a tied vote between castaways occurs, and one of the castaways in the tie does not have a vote to begin with, their votes do not cancel each other out, and all castaways eligible to vote still retain voting power within the revote, although Sierra could only vote for Sam in the revote.)							
Tiyana		TK					Rome	Gabe									
Rome			Aysha	Kishan	Kishan (Note: This player used a vote stealer advantage, allowing them to steal one vote from another player and cast two ballots.)		Sam										
Anika	Jon					None											
Kishan			Aysha	None (Note: This player lost their vote as another player used a vote stealer advantage.)													
Aysha			Genevieve														
TK		Sue															
Jon	Anika																

Jury vote
Episode	14		
Day	26		
Finalist	Rachel	Sam	Sue
Votes	7–1–0		
Juror	Vote		
Teeny	Yes		
Genevieve	Yes		
Andy	Yes		
Caroline	Yes		
Kyle		Yes	
Gabe	Yes		
Sol	Yes		
Sierra	Yes		

== Production ==
On December 15, 2023, Manoa Kamikamica, the Fijian Minister of Commerce, Trade, Tourism and Transport, announced that the Fijian Parliament had renewed its contract with Survivor for an additional two years. A preview for the season was released on May 22, 2024, right after the finale of Survivor 46 aired.

== Reception ==
Survivor 47 received positive reviews. Dalton Ross of Entertainment Weekly ranked the season 24th out of 47, praising the cast and the abundance of emotional exits from the game. Nick Caruso of TVLine ranked this season 22nd out of 47.

Viewership and ratings per episode of Survivor 47
No.	Title	Air date	Rating/share (18–49)	Viewers (millions)	DVR (18–49)	DVR viewers (millions)	Total (18–49)	Total viewers (millions)	Ref.
1	"One Glorious and Perfect Episode"	September 18, 2024	0.73/10	4.72	—N/a	—N/a	—N/a	—N/a	
2	"Epic Boss Girl Move"	September 25, 2024	0.72/9	4.47	—N/a	—N/a	—N/a	—N/a	
3	"Belly of the Beast"	October 2, 2024	0.63/8	4.34	—N/a	—N/a	—N/a	—N/a	
4	"Is That Blood in Your Hair"	October 9, 2024	0.65/7	4.14	—N/a	—N/a	—N/a	—N/a	
5	"The Scales Be Tippin"	October 16, 2024	0.56/7	4.02	0.22	1.60	0.79	5.61	
6	"Feel the FOMO"	October 23, 2024	0.62/8	4.35	0.23	1.43	0.84	5.78	
7	"Our Pickle on Blast"	October 30, 2024	0.57/6	4.24	0.26	1.43	0.83	5.67	
8	"He's All That"	November 6, 2024	0.69/8	4.64	0.27	1.58	0.96	6.22	
9	"Nightmare Fuel"	November 13, 2024	0.71/9	4.43	0.26	1.50	0.97	5.93	
10	"Loyal to the Soil"	November 20, 2024	0.68/9	4.42	0.20	1.36	0.88	5.78	
11	"Flipping the Win Switch"	November 27, 2024	0.66/9	4.50	0.34	1.61	1.00	6.11	
12	"Operation: Italy"	December 4, 2024	0.65/9	4.60	0.23	1.39	0.88	5.99	
13	"Bob and Weave"	December 11, 2024	0.68/9	4.89	0.28	1.49	0.96	6.38	
14	"The Last Stand"	December 18, 2024	0.80/11	5.03	0.24	1.27	1.04	6.30	
