= Nathalie Anderson =

American poet and librettist (born 1948)

- Born: Nathalie FitzSimons; July 28, 1948 (age 78); Columbia, South Carolina, U.S.
- Education: Agnes Scott College; Georgia State University; Emory University (PhD)
- Occupations: Poet, author, professor

Nathalie F. Anderson (born July 28, 1948) is an American poet and librettist. She is a 1993 Pew Fellow, and author of several books of poetry: Following Fred Astaire, Crawlers, Quiver, Held and Firmly Bound (a chapbook), Stain, and Rough. In collaboration with composer Thomas Whitman, she has authored five libretti: The Black Swan, Sukey in the Dark, A Scandal in Bohemia., The Royal Singer, and Cassandra. Whitman and Anderson have also collaborated on the choral piece Babylon.

== Life ==
Born in Columbia, South Carolina, Anderson earned her bachelor's degree from Agnes Scott College in 1970, her master's degree from Georgia State University, and her Ph.D. degree from Emory University.

She has been teaching at Swarthmore College since 1982 and is currently a Professor Emerita in their Department of English Literature. She served as Director of their Program in Creative Writing as well as a Poet in Residence at the Rosenbach Museum & Library.

Anderson runs Philadelphia's literary event listserv, Lit-Philly.

Some of Anderson's work has been featured in various print and online journals: Atlanta Review, Poetry Daily, Fox Chase Review, Natural Bridge, The New Yorker, Paris Review, The Recorder: The Journal of American Irish Historical Society, Prairie Schooner, Denver Quarterly, Nimrod, Inkwell Magazine, The Louisville Review, and Southern Poetry Review.

On November 8, 2012, University of Pennsylvania's Kelly Writers House inaugurated the Eva and Leo Sussman Poetry Program with poetry readings by featured guest writers and instructors, Nathalie Anderson, Elaine Terranova, and Joan Hutton Landis.

== Awards ==
- 1998 Washington Prize from Word Works for Following Fred Astaire
- 2000 "Slow Airs" - Grand Prize Co-Winner in Inkwell Magazine's poetry competition for 2000
- 2004 "Squeeze" - Finalist for the James Hearst Poetry Prize, published in the North American Review
- 2005 The Robert McGovern Publication Prize, Ashland University, Ashland Poetry Press, for Crawlers

== Works ==
=== Poetry books ===
- Anderson, Nathalie (1978). My Hand, My Only Map: 13 poems. Atlanta, GA: House of Keys. ISBN 9780932656018.
- Anderson, Nathalie (1998). Following Fred Astaire. Washington, D.C.: The Word Works. ISBN 9780915380411.
- Anderson, Nathalie (2006). Crawlers: poems. Ashland, OH: Ashland Poetry Press, Ashland University. ISBN 9780912592596.
- Anderson, Nathalie (2011). Quiver. Rochester, VT: Penstroke Press. ISBN 9780966917789.
- Anderson, Nathalie (2017). Held and Firmly Bound. Chapin, SC: Muddy Ford Press. ISBN 9781942081104
- Anderson, Nathalie (2017). Stain. Washington, D.C.: The Word Works. ISBN 9781944585136
- Anderson, Nathalie (2024). Rough. Washington, D.C.: The Word Works. ISBN 9781944585754

=== Anthology appearances ===
- Alenier, Karren L.; Hilary Tham; Miles D. Moore, eds. (1999). Winners : a retrospective of the Washington Prize. Washington, D.C.: The Word Works. ISBN 9780915380435.
- Rice, Adrian; Angela Reid, eds. (2002). A Conversation Piece: Poetry and Art (Poets' responses to an exhibition at the Ulster Museum). Belfast: Museums and Galleries of Northern Ireland in association with Abbey Press. ISBN 0900761423.
- Potter, Jacklyn W.; Dwaine Rieves; Gary Stein, eds. (2003). Cabin fever : poets at Joaquin Miller's Cabin, 1984-2001. Washington, D.C.: The Word Works. ISBN 9780915380510.
- McEneaney, Sarah; Ingrid Schaffner, eds. (2004). Sarah McEneaney. Philadelphia: Institute of Contemporary Art, University of Pennsylvania. ISBN 9780884541042.
- Mark, Enid (2004). Ars Botanica. Wallingford, Pa.: ELM Press. ISBN 9780915380411. OCLC 57614320.
- Follett, CB; Susan Terris, eds. (2005). Runes : a review of poetry, signals. Sausalito, CA: Arctos Press. ISBN 9780972538459.
- Tobin, Daniel (2007). The book of Irish American poetry: from the eighteenth century to the present. Notre Dame, Ind: University of Notre Dame Press. ISBN 9780268042301.
- Datlow, Ellen; Kelly Link; Gavin J. Grant, eds. (2007). The year's best fantasy & horror 2007: twentieth annual collection. New York: St. Martin's Griffin. ISBN 978-0312369422.
- Datlow, Ellen; Kelly Link; Gavin J. Grant, eds. (2008). The year's best fantasy & horror 2008: twentieth annual collection. New York: St. Martin's Griffin. ISBN 9780312380489.

=== Performances ===
- Anderson, Nathalie (librettist) (September 1998), The Black Swan (a Chamber Opera in Two Acts, libretto based on the novel by Thomas Mann), Lang Performing Arts Center, Swarthmore College, Philadelphia Pa.: Orchestra 2001
- Anderson, Nathalie (librettist) (October 2001), Sukey in the Dark (a Chamber Opera in One Act), Lang Performing Arts Center, Swarthmore College, Philadelphia, Pa.: Orchestra 2001
- Anderson, Nathalie (librettist) (March 2005), Babylon (a Composition for Chorus and Orchestra, libretto based on Psalm 137), Irvine Auditorium, University of Pennsylvania, Philadelphia: The Philadelphia Singers
- Anderson, Nathalie (librettist) (2007), A Scandal in Bohemia (a Chamber Opera in Two Acts, libretto based on the story by Arthur Conan Doyle), Kimmel Center, Swarthmore College, Philadelphia, Pa.: Orchestra 2001
