= Jenelle Porter =

American art curator

Jenelle Porter is an American art curator and author of exhibition catalogs and essays about contemporary art and craft. She has curated exhibitions that have helped studio craft to gain acceptance as fine arts, including Dirt on Delight: Impulses That Form Clay (co-curated with Ingrid Schaffner) at the Institute of Contemporary Art, Philadelphia (2009) and Fiber: Sculpture 1960–Present at the Institute of Contemporary Art, Boston (2014).

== Education ==
Porter obtained her BA in art history from Barnard College in 1994, and went on to obtain an MA in critical and curatorial studies from University of California, Los Angeles in 2004.

== Curatorial positions ==
From 1994 to 1997 Porter was curatorial assistant at the Whitney Museum of American Art. From 1997 to 1998 she was curatorial fellow at the Walker Art Center, Minneapolis. Between 1998 and 2001 she was curator at the Artists Space in New York. From 2005 to 2011 she was curator at the Institute of Contemporary Art in Philadelphia and from 2011 to 2015 she was senior curator at the Institute of Contemporary Art in Boston. Since 2015 she has been an independent curator based in Los Angeles.

== Selected exhibitions/curatorial activities ==
| Year | Exhibition | Location |
|---|---|---|
| 2006 | Gone Formalism | Institute of Contemporary Art, Philadelphia |
| 2007 | Jay Heikes | Institute of Contemporary Art, Philadelphia |
| 2008 | Trisha Donnelly | Institute of Contemporary Art, Philadelphia |
| 2009 | Dance with Camera | |
| 2009 | Dirt on Delight: Impulses that Form Clay | |
| 2010 | Mineral Spirits: Anne Chu and Matthew Monahan | |
| 2011 | Jessica Jackson Hutchins | Institute of Contemporary Art, Boston |
| 2011 | Charline von Heyl | |
| 2012 | Figuring Color: Kathy Butterfly, Felix Gonzalez-Torres, Roy McMakin, Sue Williams | Institute of Contemporary Art, Boston |
| 2012 | Dianna Molzan, Grand Tourist | Institute of Contemporary Art, Boston |
| 2013 | Christina Ramberg | Institute of Contemporary Art, Boston |
| 2013 | Jeffrey Gibson | Institute of Contemporary Art, Boston |
| 2013 | Mary Reid Kelley | Institute of Contemporary Art, Boston |
| 2014 | Fiber Sculpture, 1960–present | Institute of Contemporary Art, Boston |
| 2014 | Nick Cave | |
| 2014 | Matthew Ritchie | Institute of Contemporary Art, Boston |
| 2015 | Erin Shirreff | Institute of Contemporary Art, Boston |
| 2015 | Arlene Schechet: All at Once | |
| 2016 | Beverly Center Renovation Installation Projects | Hammer Museum |
| 2017 | A Line Can Go Anywhere | James Cohan Gallery, New York |
| 2019 | Less is A Bore: Maximalist Art & Design | Institute of Contemporary Art, Boston |
| 2019 | Mike Kelley: Timeless Painting | Hauser & Wirth, New York |
| 2021 | Kay Sekimachi: Geometries | Berkeley Art Museum and Pacific Film Archive, California |
| 2023 | Barbara T. Smith: Proof | Institute of Contemporary Art, Los Angeles |

== Selected publications ==
- Schaffner, Ingrid; Porter, Jenelle (2009). Dirt on Delight: Impulses That Form Clay. Philadelphia: Institute of Contemporary Art, University of Philadelphia. ISBN 9780884541172.
- Morineau, Camille; Pesapane, Lucia (2015). Ceramix: From Rodin to Schütte. Maastricht-Paris-Sèvres. ISBN 9789461612519.
- Pepich, Bruce; McQuaid, Matilda; Porter, Jenelle; Stapleton, Lyssa (2016). The Box Project: Works from the Lloyd Cotsen Collection. Los Angeles: Cotsen Occasional Press. ISBN 9780974516899.
- Hatley, Pan; Porter, Jenelle; Chaffee, Cathleen (2015). Erin Shirreff (art exhibition). Albright-Knox Art Gallery. ISBN 9781887457187.
