= Survivor: San Juan del Sur =

- Season 29
- Region 1 DVD cover
- Presented by: Jeff Probst
- No. of days: 39
- No. of castaways: 18
- Winner: Natalie Anderson
- Runner-up: Jaclyn Schultz
- Location: San Juan del Sur, Nicaragua
- No. of episodes: 15

Release
- Original network: CBS
- Original release: September 24 – December 17, 2014

Additional information
- Filming dates: June 2 – July 10, 2014

Season chronology
- ← Previous; Cagayan — Brawn vs. Brains vs. Beauty Next → Worlds Apart — White Collar vs. Blue Collar vs. No Collar

Survivor: San Juan del Sur — Blood vs. Water (commonly referred to as Survivor: San Juan del Sur) is the twenty-ninth season of the American CBS competitive reality television series Survivor, which premiered on September 24, 2014. Similar to Survivor: Blood vs. Water, the season features pairs of loved ones competing against each other but, unlike Blood vs. Water, all the players were new. The season was filmed in San Juan del Sur, Nicaragua, the same location as Survivor: Nicaragua and Survivor: Redemption Island. The two-hour finale and one-hour reunion show aired on December 17, 2014, where Natalie Anderson was named the Sole Survivor by a vote of 5–2–1 over Jaclyn Schultz and Missy Payne.

== Format ==
Survivor is a reality television show based on the Swedish show Expedition Robinson, created by Mark Burnett and Charlie Parsons. The series follows a number of participants isolated in a remote location, where they must provide food, fire, and shelter. One participant is removed from the series by majority vote every three days, with challenges held to give a reward (ranging from living- and food-related prizes to a car) and immunity from being voted out of the series. The last remaining player receives a prize of $1,000,000.

== Contestants ==
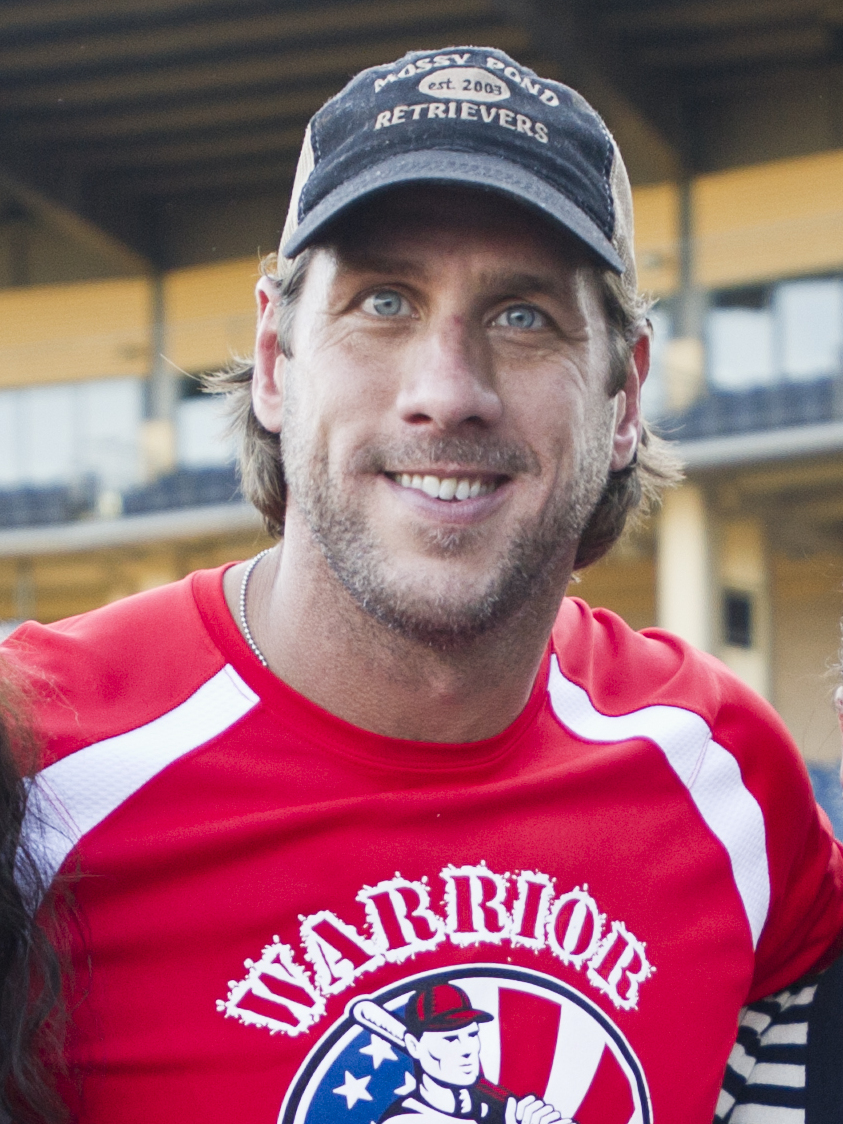
John Rocker

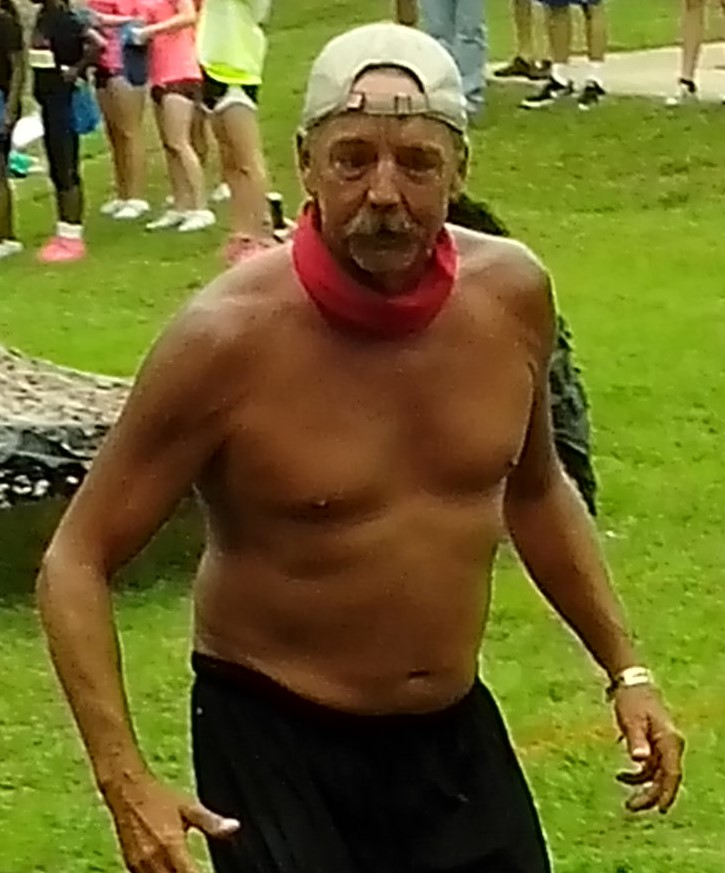
Keith Nale

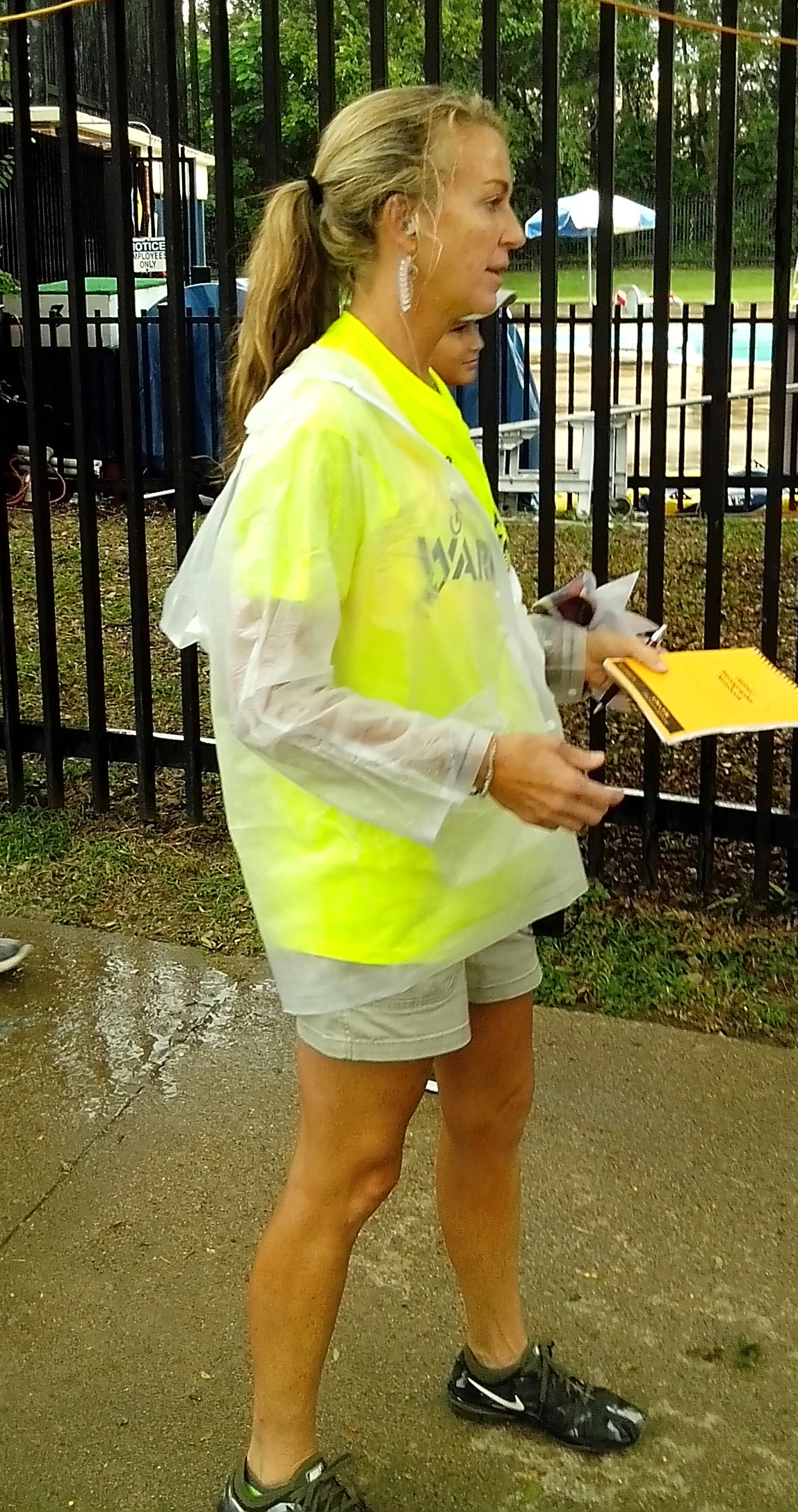
Missy Payne

The cast is composed of nine pairs of loved ones splitting into two tribes: Coyopa and Hunahpu, both named after Mayan warrior gods. Relationships between contestants included parent-child, siblings, and partners (both married and dating). Notable contestants include former professional baseball player John Rocker and two-time The Amazing Race contestants Natalie and Nadiya Anderson, who competed together on seasons 21 and 24.

San Juan del Sur is the second season of Survivor to feature a gender imbalance, following Survivor: Fiji, due to a contestant not clearing medical and being forced to withdraw. It would be followed by Survivor 47 and 51.

List of Survivor: San Juan del Sur - Blood vs. Water contestants
Contestant	Age	From	Tribe			Finish	
Contestant	Age	From	Original	Switched	Merged	Placement	Day
Nadiya Anderson Natalie's twin sister	28	Edgewater, New Jersey	Coyopa			1st voted out	Day 3
Val Collins Jeremy's wife	35	Foxboro, Massachusetts	Coyopa			2nd voted out	Day 6
John Rocker Julie's boyfriend	39	Atlanta, Georgia	Coyopa			3rd voted out	Day 8
Drew Christy Alec's brother	25	Winter Park, Florida	Hunahpu			4th voted out	Day 10
Kelley Wentworth Dale's daughter	28	Seattle, Washington	Hunahpu	Coyopa		5th voted out	Day 13
Dale Wentworth Kelley's father	55	Ephrata, Washington	Coyopa	Coyopa		6th voted out	Day 15
Julie McGee John's girlfriend	34	Atlanta, Georgia	Hunahpu	Hunahpu	Huyopa	Quit	Day 18
Josh Canfield Reed's boyfriend	32	New York, New York	Coyopa	Hunahpu	Huyopa	7th voted out 1st jury member	Day 21
Jeremy Collins Val's husband	36	Foxboro, Massachusetts	Hunahpu	Hunahpu	Huyopa	8th voted out 2nd jury member	Day 24
Wes Nale Keith's son	24	Shreveport, Louisiana	Coyopa	Hunahpu	Huyopa	9th voted out 3rd jury member	Day 26
Reed Kelly Josh's boyfriend	31	New York, New York	Hunahpu	Hunahpu	Huyopa	10th voted out 4th jury member	Day 29
Alec Christy Drew's brother	22	Winter Park, Florida	Coyopa	Hunahpu	Huyopa	11th voted out 5th jury member	Day 32
Jon Misch Jaclyn's boyfriend	26	Waterford, Michigan	Hunahpu	Coyopa	Huyopa	12th voted out 6th jury member	Day 35
Baylor Wilson Missy's daughter	20	Nashville, Tennessee	Coyopa	Coyopa	Huyopa	13th voted out 7th jury member	Day 37
Keith Nale Wes's father	53	Shreveport, Louisiana	Hunahpu	Coyopa	Huyopa	14th voted out 8th jury member	Day 38
Missy Payne Baylor's mother	47	Dallas, Texas	Hunahpu	Coyopa	Huyopa	2nd runner-up	Day 39
Jaclyn Schultz Jon's girlfriend	25	Las Vegas, Nevada	Coyopa	Coyopa	Huyopa	Runner-up	Day 39
Natalie Anderson Nadiya's twin sister	28	Edgewater, New Jersey	Hunahpu	Hunahpu	Huyopa	Sole Survivor	Day 39

=== Future appearances ===
Keith Nale, Jeremy Collins, and Kelley Wentworth returned for Survivor: Cambodia. Natalie Anderson was originally selected for Survivor: Game Changers but had to back out for medical reasons. Anderson would eventually return to compete on Survivor: Winners at War, along with Collins. Wentworth returned again for Survivor: Edge of Extinction.

Outside of Survivor, Kelley Wentworth and Jeremy Collins competed on the premiere of Candy Crush. Natalie Anderson competed on the thirty-sixth season of The Challenge. In 2025, Collins competed on the third season of the Peacock reality TV series The Traitors. In 2026, Anderson competed on the fourth season of The Traitors.

== Season summary ==
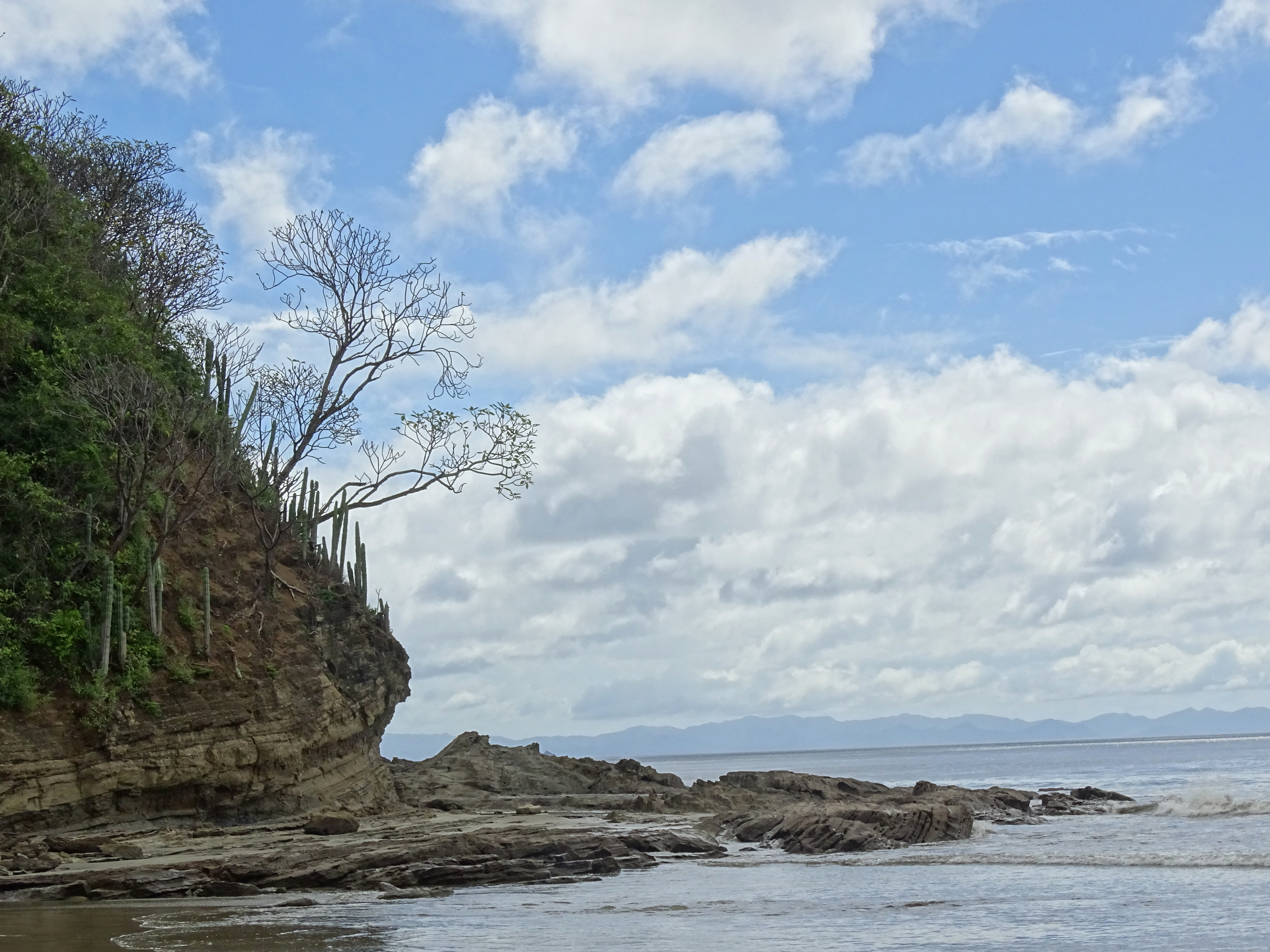
The season filmed in San Juan del Sur in Nicaragua.

Due to one pair dropping out prior to the game, the season started with nine pairs of loved ones separated into two tribes: Coyopa and Hunahpu. Coyopa lost nearly every challenge; the tribe was initially dominated by a men's alliance led by John, but Josh was torn between allegiances to the men and perpetual target Baylor. On Hunahpu, Jeremy and Natalie aligned after their loved ones were voted out, and argued with John at challenges over their loved ones' eliminations. Due to John's volatility, Josh orchestrated his ouster and took over the alliance. After a tribe swap, Missy (Baylor's mother) came into power on Coyopa, while Josh and Jeremy vied for control on Hunahpu. While both men targeted each other, their conflict was never resolved as their tribe won every challenge.

At the merge, two factions emerged: Jeremy's alliance with Natalie, Julie, Missy and Baylor, and Josh's alliance with his boyfriend Reed, Wes and his father Keith, and Alec, with dating couple Jon and Jaclyn in the middle. While they prepared to side with Josh's alliance for the first post-merge Tribal Council, it was cancelled after Julie quit the game, giving Jon and Jaclyn time to change their minds and side with Jeremy's alliance to eliminate Josh. Jeremy's fortune was not to last, and he was blindsided by his alliance sans Natalie. While Natalie rejoined her old alliance to pick off the remnants of Josh's alliance, Keith was spared as Natalie enacted her revenge, voting out Jon and Baylor and leaving no intact pairs of loved ones remaining. Keith then lost the final immunity challenge and was the last player voted out of the game.

Missy, Jaclyn, and Natalie were the final three. At the final Tribal Council, Reed eviscerated Missy's character, comparing her to a “wicked stepmother” and chastising her for a lack of strategy, while Jaclyn was questioned for having only made moves with others, primarily Jon. Natalie was praised for making bold moves without a loved one's support, and was ultimately awarded the title of Sole Survivor with five votes to win, compared to Jaclyn's two and Missy's one.

Challenge winners and eliminations by episodes
Episode			Challenge winner(s)		Exiled	Eliminated	
No.	Title	Original air date	Reward	Immunity	Exiled	Tribe	Player
1	"Suck It Up and Survive"	September 24, 2014	Jeremy (Note: This player won the hero duel, earning reward for their entire tribe and sending one person from their tribe to join the loser of the duel to Exile Island.) (Hunahpu)	Hunahpu	Keith (Hunahpu)	Coyopa	Nadiya
1	"Suck It Up and Survive"	September 24, 2014	Jeremy (Hunahpu)	Hunahpu	Val (Note: This castaway lost the hero duel and was sent to Exile Island.) (Coyopa)	Coyopa	Nadiya
2	"Method to This Madness"	October 1, 2014	Julie (Hunahpu)	Hunahpu	Jeremy (Hunahpu)	Coyopa	Val
2	"Method to This Madness"	October 1, 2014	Julie (Hunahpu)	Hunahpu	John (Coyopa)	Coyopa	Val
3	"Actions vs. Accusations"	October 8, 2014	Wes (Coyopa)	Hunahpu	Josh (Coyopa)	Coyopa	John
3	"Actions vs. Accusations"	October 8, 2014	Wes (Coyopa)	Hunahpu	Keith (Hunahpu)	Coyopa	John
4	"We're a Hot Mess"	October 15, 2014	Jon (Hunahpu)	Coyopa	Drew (Hunahpu)	Hunahpu	Drew
4	"We're a Hot Mess"	October 15, 2014	Jon (Hunahpu)	Coyopa	Jaclyn (Coyopa)	Hunahpu	Drew
5	"Blood is Blood"	October 22, 2014	None (Note: There was no reward challenge and no one was sent to Exile Island due to the tribe swap.)	Hunahpu	None	Coyopa	Kelley
6	"Make Some Magic Happen"	October 29, 2014	Reed (Hunahpu)	Hunahpu	Baylor (Coyopa)	Coyopa	Dale
6	"Make Some Magic Happen"	October 29, 2014	Reed (Hunahpu)	Hunahpu	Natalie (Hunahpu)	Coyopa	Dale
7	"Million Dollar Decision"	November 5, 2014	None (Note: There was no reward challenge and no one was sent to Exile Island due to the merge.)	Keith	None	Huyopa	Julie
8	"Wrinkle in the Plan"	November 12, 2014	Jeremy, Keith, Natalie, Reed, Wes	Jeremy	Jon	Huyopa	Josh
9	"Gettin' to Crunch Time"	November 19, 2014	Alec, Baylor, ~~Jeremy~~ (Jaclyn), ~~Natalie~~ (Jon), Reed (Note: Jeremy and Natalie were on the winning team but chose to give their reward to Jaclyn and Jon.)	Baylor	Jeremy	Huyopa	Jeremy
10	"This Is Where We Build Trust"	November 26, 2014	Alec, Jaclyn, Jon, ~~Reed~~ (Missy) (Note: Reed was on the winning team but chose to give his reward to Missy.)	Reed	Wes	Huyopa	Wes
11	"Kind of Like Cream Cheese"	December 3, 2014	Missy [Baylor, Natalie]	Keith	Jon	Huyopa	Reed
12	"Still Holdin' On"	December 3, 2014	Natalie [Jaclyn, Jon]	Jon	Alec	Huyopa	Alec
13	"Let's Make a Move"	December 10, 2014	~~Jon~~ (Baylor), Keith, Missy (Note: Jon was on the winning team but chose to give his reward to Baylor.)	Natalie	Natalie	Huyopa	Jon
14	"This Is My Time"	December 17, 2014	Keith	Keith	Jaclyn	Huyopa	Baylor
14	"This Is My Time"	December 17, 2014	None	Jaclyn	None	Huyopa	Keith
15	"Reunion"	December 17, 2014					

In the case of multiple castaways who win reward, they are listed in order of finish, or alphabetically where it was a team effort; where one castaway won and invited others, the invitees are in square brackets.

== Episodes ==
No. overall	No. in season	Title	CBS recap	Rating/share (18-49)	Original release date	U.S. viewers (millions)	Weekly rank
426	1	"Suck It Up and Survive"	Recap	2.7/9	September 24, 2014	9.75	20
The nine pairs of loved ones were marooned separately in Nicaragua, and given only flint to survive the night. The next morning, the castaways gathered at Hero Arena, where they were split up into two tribes: Coyopa and Hunahpu. The tribes were immediately given their first reward challenge, to be completed by one representative per tribe. After winning rock-paper-scissors, Hunahpu earned the right to choose their rep, and Jeremy volunteered. Host Jeff Probst revealed that Jeremy would be competing against his loved one, his wife Val. Reward challenge: The duelists, tethered to ropes tied through a wooden cube, would untangle the ropes attached to them to release two rings. They would then use the rings and ropes to lasso two wooden platforms. First castaway to retrieve both their platforms would win flint and a bag of beans for their tribe. Jeremy won the duel and, as a result, Val was sent to Exile Island. Jeremy also had to choose someone from his tribe to join Val; he chose Keith. Upon arriving at the Hunahpu camp, Jeremy quickly made alliances with Missy, Kelley, and Natalie. At Coyopa, Dale, the oldest member of his tribe, struggled to fit in and, during a trip to the well, found and pocketed a mysterious wooden fragment, unsure of whether or not it was a hidden idol. Dale later won favor with his tribe after successfully making fire with his glasses. On Exile Island, Val and Keith chose urns to see who would get a clue to a hidden immunity idol; Val picked the urn containing the clue, and lied to Keith about what the note actually was. Back at Coyopa, Wes correctly identified his tribemate John as John Rocker, former relief pitcher for the Atlanta Braves baseball team. While Wes hoped that this would forge an alliance between the two, John became wary of Wes's newfound knowledge, and considered voting him out. At the immunity challenge, Keith and Val rejoined their tribes from Exile Island. Immunity challenge: All nine tribemates would crawl under an obstacle, then retrieve three bags of pieces hung high above. The tribe would then use the pieces to ascend several stories of a massive tower, first by throwing a rope onto a hook then climbing the rope, the second by assembling and climbing up pegs, and the third only using their bodies. At the top of the tower, four tribemates would solve a puzzle using the remaining pieces. The first tribe to successfully complete the puzzle would win immunity. Coyopa used John's height and strength to take an early lead, however they struggled at the puzzle and lost the challenge. At Hunahpu, Jeremy apologized for sending Keith to Exile Island, and promised to make it up to him. At Coyopa, Dale became wary of Nadiya for her backstabbing gameplay on The Amazing Race. The tribe was divided by gender lines, with Josh, perceived by Nadiya as "one of the girls" for being gay, caught in the middle. He was approached by Baylor, who decided to stick with him and not necessarily the other women. The women decided to target Dale due to his age, and the men targeted Nadiya. At Tribal Council, Josh voted for Baylor while Baylor flipped on the girls, joining the other four men to form a majority of five to send Nadiya out of the game.
427	2	"Method to This Madness"	Recap	2.4/9	October 1, 2014	9.49	24
As the Coyopa tribe returned to camp after voting out Nadiya, Josh explained to Baylor that he voted for her to remove suspicion that the two were working together, although Baylor still felt scared by Josh's move. The next morning, at Hunahpu, the tribe realized that they had lost their flint, with Jon owning up to the misplacement. Before the reward challenge, John beat Reed in rock-paper-scissors, giving Coyopa the right to pick the representatives for the duel; John volunteered for Coyopa, setting a matchup between himself and his girlfriend, Julie. Reward challenge: The duelists would balance a ball on a disc attached to a pole while maneuvering a series of obstacles, returning to the start if they drop their ball. Then, they will roll three balls to land in a series of holes. The first duelist to land all three balls in the holes would receive fishing gear for their tribe. Julie won in a blowout victory, and chose Jeremy to join John on Exile Island. Before the tribes left, Hunahpu attempted to bargain with Jeff for a new flint, offering their remaining supply of beans for trade. Jeff vocalized that the trade was poorly planned and unbalanced, in turn putting Hunahpu's newly-won fishing gear on the line, which the tribe reluctantly accepted as trade. At Coyopa, with John exiled, the tribe discussed his past as a baseball player, and Dale brought up the controversial statements he made about minority groups. At Exile Island, Jeremy picked the urn with the clue, but shared it with John under the proviso that they protect each other's loved ones upon returning to camp. Immunity challenge: Facing off one-on-one, the castaways would battle sumo style using padded bags to try to knock their opponent off a platform and into the ocean to score a point for their tribe. The first tribe to five points would win immunity. With a score of 5–4, Coyopa lost their fourth consecutive challenge. Upon returning to camp, John attempted to secure an alliance with Val, however she lied to him, claiming that she had two hidden idols that would keep herself and Jaclyn safe that night. John decided to look for the hidden immunity idol using Jeremy's information, which he found. John, still believing in Val's idols, organized a split vote between Val and Baylor with three men joining Jaclyn and Val in voting for Baylor, deemed untrustworthy after voting out Nadiya, and two men joining an unsuspecting Baylor in voting for Val to flush one of Val's idols. At Tribal Council, Val and Jaclyn attempted to rally support against Baylor, publicly accusing her of playing both sides, while Val was called out for claiming to have two idols in hopes she would play one. The split vote plan went awry after Josh switched his vote to Val, resulting in a tie between her and Baylor. Since Val had no idols to play, she was left vulnerable during the re-vote, and was voted out for her duplicity.
428	3	"Actions vs. Accusations"	Recap	2.5/8	October 8, 2014	9.65	20
Upon returning to camp, Josh revealed to John that he had switched his vote to Val at Tribal Council, explaining that if he had voted against Baylor, Val would have been safe without needing to play an idol. The next morning, at Hunahpu, Drew attempted to lead an effort to improve their shelter roof, but quickly gave up and took a nap, much to the ire of his tribe. At Hero Arena, upon seeing that his wife had been voted out, Jeremy called out the men's alliance on Coyopa; John publicly apologized to Jeremy for being unable to save Val as he had promised him on Exile Island, making Josh suspicious of John's loyalty. Reward challenge: The duelists would travel across a rickety balance beam while transporting wooden squares on a paddle. The first duelist to stack six of the squares onto the other side of the beam would win a tarp, a hammock, a mattress, pillows and blankets for their tribe, with the option of trading the reward for fishing gear. Coyopa won rock-paper-scissors to choose their duelist; Wes volunteered to compete, thinking he could beat his father, Keith. Wes' assumption was correct, winning the challenge and sending Josh to Exile Island with Keith; Coyopa, with their first challenge victory under their belt, chose the fishing gear over comfort. Back at Hunahpu, a scorned Jeremy outed John's past baseball career and derogatory remarks against minority groups, alienating John's girlfriend Julie from the tribe. At Exile Island, Keith shared the idol clue with Josh, and the two bonded despite their vastly different ways of life. At Coyopa, John effectively used the fishing gear to provide for his tribe, but Baylor still attempted to convince the majority alliance to turn against him. Immunity challenge: Two members of each tribe would be tethered together and race through a wooden obstacle course to retrieve a ball, and then attempt to shoot it into a basket. The first tribe to win three rounds would win immunity. With the score tied 2-2, Jon and Natalie edged out Wes and Alec to win Hunahpu's third consecutive immunity challenge. When Natalie began trash-talking Coyopa after her tribe's victory, John Rocker reacted by mocking her in front of everyone. Natalie called Coyopa to rally against Rocker, calling him a racist and a bigot, and he responded by telling her, "if you were a man, I'd knock your teeth out." Back at camp, John attempted to throw Baylor and Jaclyn off his scent by claiming he was going to blindside Dale while, in actuality, he and the other men would send Baylor home. After John revealed his idol to Josh, Josh decided that John had to go for his volatility, and attempted to convince Alec and Wes to blindside John. Ultimately, despite some accidental tip-offs at Tribal Council, John decided not to play his idol and was voted out with it in his pocket.
429	4	"We're a Hot Mess"	Recap	2.3/8	October 15, 2014	9.33	24
With the Coyopa tribe in good spirits after voting out John, Dale felt he was now on the outs after being the only one not to vote against John. At Hunahpu, Natalie found the flint that they had earlier lost. At Hero Arena, some Hunahpu members reacted with cheers and applause after noticing that John had been voted out. Drew attempted to trade the old flint with Jeff to get the fishing gear back while the rest of his tribe appeared embarrassed and took no part in the negotiation, but Jeff quickly shut it down. Reward challenge: The duelist would use a grappling hook to grab three bags of balls, and then use a catapult to launch the balls into five baskets. The first duelist to get a ball into each basket would win either a feast of sausages, popcorn, and s'mores for their tribe, or a tarp, a hammock, a mattress, pillows and blankets. Jon volunteered for Hunahpu after they won rock-paper-scissors to choose their duelist, pitting him against his girlfriend, Jaclyn. Jon narrowly won the challenge, and Drew volunteered to go to Exile Island with Jaclyn; Hunahpu chose the comfort items over the feast. At Exile Island, Drew revealed to Jaclyn that he planned to throw the next immunity challenge to get rid of untrustworthy players on Hunahpu. At Hunahpu, Keith went searching for the hidden immunity idol; as he was unsuccessful, he assumed that Jeremy—the only other person from his tribe to have been to Exile Island—had found it, and voiced his suspicions to his tribemates. Reed ratted Keith out to Jeremy, while Keith eventually found the idol. Immunity challenge: Four tribemates would swim out to retrieve rings tethered in the water. Once the four rings were retrieved, the other two tribemates would toss the rings onto a post. The first tribe to land all four rings would win immunity. While the tribes were neck-and-neck, Drew intentionally botched the ring tossing to give Coyopa their first immunity challenge win. Back at camp, Jon proposed getting rid of the players without loved ones, for fear that they would outnumber the couples at the merge, with Julie as his first target. Drew vehemently proposed getting rid of Kelley, whom he perceived as the strongest manipulator of a potential women's alliance, while Jeremy tried to get support to vote Keith out. Despite being outnumbered by the men, the four women banded together to take advantage of the men's disorganization, and targeted Drew. At Tribal Council, Jeremy called out Keith for going straight to the other tribemates regarding Jeremy's potential idol, and not discussing it with him directly. Kelley, Keith, Drew, and Julie all received votes, but Drew was sent out of the game after receiving votes from the women and Jeremy.
430	5	"Blood is Blood"	Recap	2.2/7	October 22, 2014	9.22	<25
After returning from Hunahpu's first Tribal Council, Jon, having lost his closest tribal ally in Drew, attempted to reintegrate within the tribe. At Hero Arena, instead of a duel taking place, Jeff announced a tribe swap. On the new Coyopa tribe were pairs Kelley and Dale, Missy and Baylor, and Jon and Jaclyn, with Keith as the only single castaway; Hunahpu's only pair was Josh and Reed, joined by singles Natalie, Jeremy, Wes, Alec, and Julie. The new Hunahpu tribe lamented their nearly-depleted supply of rice, while Natalie and Jeremy were afraid that they would be in the minority against the three former Coyopa members—Alec, Josh, and Wes—and Reed, Josh's boyfriend, so they attempted to sway Alec to form an alliance of those whose loved ones had already been voted out. At Coyopa, Missy and Dale quickly butted heads over rice portioning, and Missy thought about targeting Dale after hearing that he had tried to vote out her daughter, Baylor. Before the immunity challenge, a starving Hunahpu once again considered bartering with Jeff, this time for more rice. Immunity challenge: The tribes would race to dig up a bag containing two keys, then crawl through mud and use the keys to open the gate. Once through the gate, the tribes would shake a pole to release sandbags; two tribe members would then throw the sandbags on a wobbly suspended platform. First tribe to get ten bags on the platform wins immunity. Hunahpu held onto their early lead to land ten sandbags on the platform before Coyopa even threw one. After their victory, Hunahpu attempted to make a deal with Jeff for more rice, and Jeff promised to visit their camp the next morning to resolve the situation. Back at Coyopa, Dale and Missy targeted each other; Jon and Jaclyn, knowing that they held the power, pledged loyalty to both Missy and Baylor, and Dale and Kelley. While Jaclyn voiced concern with trusting Baylor, having already been betrayed by her once, she also conceded to Dale's sneakiness. At Tribal Council, Kelley and Dale voted against Baylor, but the other five aligned against them; with three of their votes, Kelley was voted out.
431	6	"Make Some Magic Happen"	Recap	2.2/7	October 29, 2014	9.07	24
After his daughter's elimination, Dale again found himself on the bottom of his tribe. He showed Jon the wooden fragment he had found early on, claiming it was an immunity idol and he would not be the next one voted out. At Hunahpu, the starving tribe was visited by Jeff, who reprimanded the tribe for being incredibly mismanaged and demanded all of their reward comfort items, hatchet, hammer, a pot, and their extra flint in exchange for a new bag of rice; Hunahpu conceded to the trade. At the reward duel, since there were no intact pairs on opposite tribes who had yet to duel, the tribes were tasked to send their strongest competitor; Hunahpu sent Reed, while Coyopa chose Baylor. Reward challenge: The blindfolded duelist would race through a series of obstacles to a station where they would tactility study a mask. They would then untie three bags of puzzle pieces, one at a time, and race back through the obstacles to a second station, where they would blindly recreate the mask with the puzzle pieces; while all of the pieces fit, only seven were colored and shaped correctly. The first duelist to correctly recreate the mask at the second station would win a grill, charcoal and skewers of meat and vegetables for their tribe. Reed handily defeated Baylor to win the challenge for Hunahpu; while he initially chose to send Julie to Exile Island with Baylor, Natalie volunteered. Back at Coyopa, Jon told Missy and Baylor about Dale's idol, thrusting a backup target on Keith. At Exile Island, Baylor shared the idol clue with Natalie. At Hunahpu, despite enjoying the reward, the tribe was still upset with the rice trade, and were forced to brave out a storm that night without their tarp, with Julie in particular having a very hard time. Immunity challenge: The tribes would race over a tall wall and work together to push a wooden cube toward a series of posts. At each post was a bag of scrolls; after the tribes collect three bags, two tribe members would assemble the scrolls vertically to form an image. The first tribe to successfully complete the scroll puzzle would win immunity. Although Coyopa entered the puzzle portion with a lead, Jon and Missy got caught up with one piece, allowing Hunahpu to pull from behind and win. Dale, knowing his poor standing in Coyopa, offered Jon his idol if he survived the night's vote, and asked him to vote against Missy. Baylor suggested to Missy, Jon, and Jaclyn that they split their votes between Keith and Dale out of fear of Dale's idol. While Dale reminded the others about Baylor's betrayal of the women at the first Tribal Council, the four followed through with their vote splitting plan, and Keith joined Jon and Jaclyn in voting against Dale, sending him out of the game.
432	7	"Million Dollar Decision"	Recap	2.3/7	November 5, 2014	9.31	19
The morning after Tribal Council, Missy confessed to Keith that she and Baylor voted against him solely as a precaution against Dale’s potential idol, which made an upset Keith question his place in their alliance despite their apology. At Hunahpu, two factions made themselves clear in preparation for the merge: Josh and Reed’s majority alliance with Alec and Wes, and the “singles” alliance of Jeremy, Natalie, and Julie. Later that day, the tribes merged and enjoyed a commemorative feast. In the ensuing strategic scramble, Jeremy reconnected with Missy, and added her, Baylor, Jon, and Jaclyn to his alliance, while Keith aligned with his son Wes and his alliance. The next morning, Josh continued to consolidate his alliance and target Jeremy. Josh tried to realign with Baylor but, despite Josh’s earlier protection of her, Baylor found herself torn between her allegiances with Josh and her mother, Missy; while Baylor voiced her uneasiness in betraying Josh, Missy told Baylor to not let her emotions rule her. Josh, noting that Baylor would be impossible to control with Missy around, decided to cajole Jon and Jaclyn instead. The tribe noticed that some of the leftover trail mix from the merge feast was missing, and started searching everyone's bags for it. Jon found it in Julie's bag, and the tribe ate it out of anger for her selfishness; when Julie returned from a walk, the tribe gave her the cold shoulder. Immunity challenge: The castaways would balance a ball on a disc attached to knotted ropes, moving their hands up a knot every few minutes to increase difficulty. After 25 minutes, a second ball would be added. Castaways would be eliminated when a ball fell off their disc; the last castaway with all balls remaining would win immunity. Keith outlasted Wes to win the first individual immunity of the game. Upon returning to camp, Julie overheard Alec making fun of her for taking the trail mix, and later told Missy that she was considering quitting due to missing her eliminated boyfriend John and feeling alone; while Missy implored Julie to stay in the game for at least one more night, Julie perceived that Missy's support was only because she needed Julie to vote with their alliance that night, and felt further alienated. After weighing offers from both sides, Jon and Jaclyn decided to join Josh’s couple-heavy alliance and blindside Jeremy, however, Julie decided to officially quit the game after a quick talk with Jeff outside camp. Jeff informed the rest of the castaways of Julie's decision and cancelled that night's Tribal Council, leaving Josh and Jeremy's feud intact for at least three more days.
433	8	"Wrinkle In the Plan"	Recap	2.3/7	November 12, 2014	9.51	24
The remaining competitors were upset at Julie for quitting and postponing a Tribal Council, but Jon and Jaclyn reaffirmed their commitment to vote out Jeremy. At the reward challenge, the tribe was divided into two teams; Missy was not chosen and thus ineligible for the reward. Reward challenge: The two teams would load heavy puzzle pieces onto a track and push them to the base of a tower; they would then assemble the tower from the pieces to build a temple structure. One teammate would run to the top of the temple to unlock a statue, and the whole team would then hoist the statue to the top of a structure to unlock a flag. The first team to unlock their flag would win a trip to a taco bar and a feast including chicken, pork, steak, beer, and margaritas. The team of Reed, Keith, Wes, Jeremy, and Natalie maintained their lead to win the challenge; they chose to exile Jon. At the taco bar, the winners enjoyed their reward, but the combination of players from the two different factions resulted in awkward exchanges, although Wes' overeating and subsequent sickness alleviated some tension. Back at camp, Josh again pleaded with Baylor for her vote but, even after reminders of his protection of her on the old Coyopa tribe, she refused to vote with Josh's alliance. On Exile Island, Jon found a new hidden immunity idol after receiving a clue. After the reward winners returned to camp, the rest of the tribe was turned off by Wes, Alec, and Keith's candid discussion of their bodily functions, and misogynistic behavior toward the women, which alienated Jaclyn and pushed her toward the women and Jeremy's alliance. While Keith thought they should talk strategy with Jaclyn, Alec convinced him not to, confident in Jon's loyalty. Immunity Challenge: Jeff would display a series of symbols to the castaways; they would then have to recreate the sequence from memory. If a castaway chose an incorrect symbol, they would be eliminated. The last castaway remaining would win immunity. The challenge came down to rivals Josh and Jeremy, with Jeremy coming out on top. Upon arriving to camp, Jon told Jaclyn about his idol, while Josh's alliance shifted their target to Baylor. Jaclyn persuaded Jon to betray Josh's alliance for their poor treatment of her in Jon's absence and for the men's potential as challenge threats. Keith told Missy that Baylor was his alliance's target, and the two parents squabbled over their on-island parenting methods. At Tribal Council, Jaclyn and Jon evaluated their swing vote status, and members of both sides publicly pleaded for their votes; Jaclyn announced her disappointment in Josh's alliance for disrespecting her when Jon wasn't around, and that led to them ultimately siding with Jeremy's alliance to send Josh to the jury.
434	9	"Gettin' to Crunch Time"	Recap	2.4/8	November 19, 2014	9.85	21
After his boyfriend Josh's elimination, a livid Reed vowed to rebound while the rest of his tribemates dealt with the repercussions of Jon and Jaclyn officially joining Jeremy's alliance. Reward challenge: The tribe was divided into two teams of five; one member per team would face off on a wobbly beam and try to knock the opponent into the mud pit below. The winning competitor would earn a point for their team; first team to five points would win a yacht ride down the San Juan del Sur coast and enjoy a feast of sandwiches, cocktails and champagne. After a 4-4 tie, Baylor defeated her mother Missy to win the challenge for her, Alec, Reed, Jeremy, and Natalie. Natalie and Jeremy decided to give up their spots on the reward to Jon and Jaclyn out of gratitude and to ensure their loyalty, while the reward-goers decided to exile Jeremy. On the yacht, Jon and Jaclyn were thankful for Jeremy and Natalie's sacrifice, but understood that it was still a game move. On Exile Island, after an unsuccessful idol hunt, Jeremy had to endure two restless, rainy nights, which left him drained of energy and suspicious that Jon had found the idol; back at camp, Jon was worried about Jeremy's return for that very reason. Immunity challenge: Only using their feet, the castaways would unspool a rope to release a pile of blocks and then, still only with their feet, stack the blocks into three rows on a rotating circular platform. First castaway to stack three rows and then place a flag in the center of their platform would win immunity. After Reed and Keith faltered with their final blocks, Baylor was able to stay steady and win immunity. Nervous that he was going to follow his boyfriend out of the game, Reed decided to stir up trouble and searched through Keith's bag. He found the instructions for playing a hidden immunity idol, and showed it to Jaclyn, Missy and Baylor. Meanwhile, Jeremy attempted to catch Jon lying about the hidden idol, which led to a paranoid Jon telling Missy about his idol and trying to blindside Jeremy, forgoing the original plan of splitting the votes between Reed and Keith. At Tribal Council, Jaclyn announced her suspicion that one of Wes and Keith had an idol, which resulted in a shouting match of Keith and Wes against Jon and Jaclyn about the latter flipping to Jeremy's alliance, and Wes and Keith's treatment of the women of the tribe. Ultimately, Keith decided not to play his idol and received votes from Natalie and Jeremy, but Jon, Jaclyn, Missy, Baylor and Reed united to blindside Jeremy out of the game.
435	10	"This Is Where We Build Trust"	Recap	2.1/7	November 26, 2014	8.90	18
After Tribal Council, Reed tried to reconfirm the need for he, Keith, Wes, and Alec to stick together, while Jon told Natalie about his idol in order to retain her loyalty despite blindsiding Jeremy, her closest ally. Natalie agreed to remain in the alliance, but knew she would eventually have to betray Jon. Reward challenge: The tribe was divided into two teams of four; each teammate would swim to a platform, where they would climb it and leap off while grabbing a key. Then, they would swim out and untether puzzle pieces. Once all four teammates retrieved their puzzle pieces, they would have to find the key that unlocks the puzzle's base, and then assemble the statue puzzle. The first team to assemble the statue would win a trip to a nearby village, where they would serve as Survivor ambassadors and deliver baseball equipment to the children, followed by a meal of popcorn, burgers and hot dogs. Alec, Jon, Jaclyn, and Reed won the challenge after Missy, Baylor, Natalie, and Wes struggled with unlocking the puzzle base. As Missy had never yet been on a reward trip, Reed volunteered to give up his spot to her; the reward-goers exiled Wes. Back at camp, Reed and Keith decided to target Jon at the next Tribal Council, while Natalie and Baylor searched for a hidden immunity idol with the clues they were given on Exile earlier in the game, leading to Natalie finding the idol. Immunity challenge: The castaways would balance their feet on a narrow perch while holding handles above their heads, with the last player remaining winning immunity. While many of the castaways succumbed to food temptations, Reed outlasted Natalie after three hours to earn immunity. Back at camp, Reed played double agent and, along with Alec, convinced the rest of the tribe to split their votes between Keith and Wes, allowing Reed, Wes, Keith, and Alec to vote Jon out despite being at a numerical disadvantage. While Jon was skeptical of Reed's loyalty, Missy convinced Jon to trust him. At Tribal Council, Reed went along with pretending that he was voting against Keith and Wes, prompting Keith to tell Reed to "stick to the plan." This led to Missy and Jon's alliance whispering amongst each other wondering if Reed and Keith were working together, and if Reed was trustworthy. After the votes were cast, Natalie encouraged Jon to play his idol, which he did, and Keith played his. The four votes cast against Jon were negated, as were the three cast against Keith, sending Wes to the jury with only two votes.
436	11	"Kind Of Like Cream Cheese"	Recap	2.1/7	December 3, 2014	8.71	TBA
After returning to camp, Jaclyn thanked Natalie for telling Jon to play his idol; Jon privately berated Jaclyn for giving Natalie praise, thinking it would make him look bad if he reached the final Tribal Council. Reward challenge: Each round, the castaways would be asked a series of questions about any player who reached the merge. The castaways who correctly answer the question would then chop a rope belonging another castaway; when a castaway's rope was chopped three times, they would be out of the challenge. The last player remaining would win a horseback ride followed by a barbeque and overnight stay at a resort. After the minority alliance of Reed, Alec, and Keith were eliminated, the remaining five openly began consulting each other to determine the winner and whom to exile. Jeff decided to stop the challenge, as the majority alliance decided to award Missy with the victory. Jon volunteered to be exiled, and Missy was given the choice to take two more castaways with her on the reward; she picked Baylor and Natalie, leaving Jaclyn alone at camp with the minority alliance. After a comment from Reed about how he still likes Jaclyn despite her siding with the other alliance, Baylor retorted, resulting in Reed calling Baylor a brat, angering Missy. At Exile Island, Jon found another idol, while Jaclyn, scorned after being left behind from the reward, again considered flipping alliances in Jon's absence as she feared Missy, Baylor, and Natalie would eventually vote out her and Jon. Immunity challenge: The castaways would balance a long wooden paddle on a pivot point. They would then roll a ball along the shaft and try to balance the ball on one of six spots on the paddle. The first castaways to have six balls balanced on the paddle at the same time would win. Keith stayed steady to win immunity. Upon returning to camp after two days on Exile, Jon went for a chat with Jaclyn, but snapped at her after she started talking strategy. An angry Jaclyn stormed away and refused to talk to Jon, while both sides attempted to sway the pair to their side, noting the difficulty in making decisions with a pair that refuses to communicate with each other. At Tribal Council, Jon and Jaclyn decided to stay with their alliance, and Reed was eliminated in a unanimous vote.
437	12	"Still Holdin' On"	Recap	2.1/7	December 3, 2014	8.71	TBA
After Tribal Council, Jon and Jaclyn resolved their argument, while Alec, as one of the two remaining outsiders, lamented his poor standing in the game. Reward challenge: The castaways would stand on a block while stabilizing a ball against a hanging piece of wood. If a castaway fell off or dropped their ball, they would be eliminated; the last player remaining would win a meal of spaghetti, chicken parmesan, garlic bread, wine, and dessert delivered to them at camp, along with a night in a king-sized canopy bed. Natalie outlasted Jaclyn to win the challenge and, after exiling Alec, chose to share the reward with Jaclyn and Jon in order to keep their trust while she tried to blindside Jon for betraying Jeremy. The ploy seemed to be working when Jon told Natalie about his new hidden immunity idol; Natalie told Baylor about her plan to blindside Jon, who agreed to it despite Jon's closeness with Baylor's mother, Missy. Immunity challenge: The castaways would pull on a rope attached to an unbalanced table to keep the table level while travelling to a station with ten wooden blocks, transferring the blocks to the table one at a time. The transferred blocks must remain upright or else the castaway would have to return to the table and restack the blocks before moving on to the next block. The first castaway to have all ten blocks standing for a count of three would win immunity. Jon narrowly defeated Keith to win immunity, throwing Natalie's plans into disarray. The majority alliance of five decided to split the vote between Keith and Alec just to be safe, with three votes on Keith to take out the proven challenge threat. Alec, to save himself, decided to open up emotionally to Baylor, talking about his loneliness after his brother Drew's early elimination. Natalie considered deviating from her alliance's plan and voting for Alec instead, which would spare Keith and ensure his loyalty during her impending coup. At Tribal Council, Natalie decided to follow through with her move, switching her vote to Alec and sending him out of the game, much to Missy, Jaclyn, and Jon's surprise.
438	13	"Let's Make a Move"	Recap	2.4/8	December 10, 2014	9.47	TBA
After voting Alec out, Natalie lied to Jon and Jaclyn, claiming to have misunderstood the instructions regarding the split vote plan, which they believed. Natalie then told Keith that she had spared him from elimination and wanted to blindside Jon. Reward challenge: The castaways would be divided into two teams of three; the teams, tethered to each other at the waist, would race through a series of obstacles, then fill a bucket with water and head over a giant teeter-totter. Then, they would pour the water into a larger bucket; once the bucket is filled, it would lower a gate. The team would then head through the gate and solve a puzzle. The first team to correctly solve the puzzle would win a day at a spa, including a shower, massage, and meal. Missy twisted her ankle on the teeter-totter, slowing her, Jon, and Keith down, but the trio worked quickly on the puzzle to win the challenge. Jon gave up his reward to Baylor, and both Jon and Natalie volunteered to be exiled, but ultimately Natalie was sent. Back at camp, Jaclyn told Jon she was suspicious of Natalie for voting against Alec, but Jon still believed it was a mistake. Before the immunity challenge, a medical team member looked at Missy's swollen ankle. She was cleared to remain in the game, but was unable to compete in the challenge. Immunity challenge: The castaways would hold onto handles while balancing on a teeter-totter supporting a vase. If the vase fell, the castaway would be eliminated. The last castaway remaining would win immunity. After a gust of wind knocked over Jon's vase, Natalie won immunity. After the challenge, Natalie told Keith her plan to split the votes between Jaclyn and Jon to avoid Jon's idol, and coached Keith to remain calm at Tribal Council to avoid him getting scared and running his mouth as he had earlier in the game. Baylor and Natalie tried to convince Missy to join them, but Missy told them she couldn't do that, refusing to break her promise to Jon. At Tribal Council, Keith pretended that he was on his way out and Jaclyn and Jon admitted that they felt safe, with Jon discussing his plans for his speech at the final Tribal Council. Missy conceded that she was loyal to a fault, but decided to vote against Jaclyn, forcing a three-way tie in votes between the couple and Keith. Upon the revote, Jon was sent to the jury.
439	14	"This Is My Time"	Recap	2.4/8	December 17, 2014	9.79	TBA
After her boyfriend's elimination, Jaclyn expressed her anger when Missy, Baylor, and Natalie tried to rationalize their betrayal of Jon; Missy and Baylor later reinforced their desire to go to the end with Natalie. Reward challenge: Each castaway would unspool a rope until they felt they had enough slack to continue on the course. They then would assemble a bridge by placing wooden poles in open slots across two beams. Once across, they would throw sandbags to knock down ten stacked circular blocks. The first castaway to finish would win an advantage in the next immunity challenge. Due to Missy's injury, she sat out of the challenge. Keith maintained his lead over Natalie to win the reward and exile Jaclyn. Back at camp, Keith used his advantage — access to a practice table for the upcoming challenge—and practiced as long as he could. Before the immunity challenge, Missy and Baylor further discussed sticking with Natalie, as she was likely to survive the next Tribal Council with her hidden immunity idol. Natalie, however, conspired with Keith and Jaclyn to break up the mother and daughter pair as the last remaining set of loved ones. Immunity challenge: Each castaway would maneuver a ball across a series of obstacles on a table course. The first castaway to transfer three balls to the other side of the table would win immunity. Having spent hours practicing, Keith was able to win the challenge before the others could even get a single ball across. Back at camp, Jaclyn informed Natalie of her plan to vote for either Missy or Baylor, and promised she would take Natalie to the end, while Baylor asked Natalie to play her idol on Missy to be safe. At Tribal Council, Natalie decided to play her idol on Jaclyn after confirming with her that Jaclyn had followed through with their plan. The three votes against Jaclyn were negated, and Baylor was sent to the jury, leaving no pairs remaining. Having betrayed Missy and eliminated her daughter, Natalie made sure that Missy was not angry with her; Missy understood that it was just a game, and that Natalie did what she had to do to further herself. Natalie then confirmed with the other women that Keith was still the next to go. Immunity challenge: The castaways would race down a tower and maneuver through obstacles to retrieve bags of puzzle pieces; once all five bags of pieces were retrieved, the castaways would use them to solve a puzzle of the season's logo. However, three pieces would be missing; the castaway would then head down the tower, find the numbers that correspond to the missing shapes, and use the numbers to open a combination lock. The first player to unlock their flag would win immunity. With Missy sitting out of the challenge, Natalie and Jaclyn fought hard to prevent Keith from winning immunity. While Keith and Natalie were neck-and-neck in retrieving their puzzle pieces, an exhausted Jaclyn was able to pull from behind to finish the puzzle and open the lock to win immunity. While Keith targeted Missy, Natalie was afraid that — after making big moves at the last two Tribal Councils — she would be an easy target. Missy and Jaclyn indeed discussed eliminating Natalie, with Jaclyn conceding that that's what Jon would do if he were still in the game. At Tribal Council, while Natalie admitted that she had a chance to win, and thus was a threat to the others, the women stuck to their initial plan and Keith became the final member of the jury. At the final Tribal Council, Missy stressed the importance of loyalty in her game despite turning on Jon, Jaclyn discussed her diagnosis of MRKH syndrome, which prohibits her from having children, and how she has been persevering despite it, while Natalie explained that she managed to persist and make big moves despite her twin sister being voted out first. Jaclyn was probed about making moves primarily with others, and Reed concluded the night by comparing Missy to a "wicked stepmother" for her perceived entitlement and for making the minority alliance members feel unnecessary and subpar.
440	15	"Reunion"	Recap	1.8/8	December 17, 2014	7.31	TBA
Months after the final Tribal Council, at the live reunion, it was revealed that Natalie won the game with Josh, Jeremy, Wes, Alec, and Keith's votes, while Jaclyn received Jon and Reed's votes to place second, while Missy came in third after only receiving Baylor's vote to win.

== Voting history ==
	Original tribes					Switched tribes		Merged tribe									
Episode	1	2		3	4	5	6	7	8	9	10	11	12	13		14	
Day	3	6		8	10	13	15	18	21	24	26	29	32	35		37	38
Tribe	Coyopa	Coyopa		Coyopa	Hunahpu	Coyopa	Coyopa	Huyopa	Huyopa	Huyopa	Huyopa	Huyopa	Huyopa	Huyopa		Huyopa	Huyopa
Eliminated	Nadiya	Tie (Note: The first Tribal Council vote resulted in a tie. Per the rules, a second vote was held where the castaways involved in the tie would not vote and the remaining castaways could only vote for those who tied.)	Val	John	Drew	Kelley	Dale	Julie	Josh	Jeremy	Wes	Reed	Alec	Tie	Jon	Baylor	Keith
Votes	5–3–1	4–4	5–1	5–2	5–2–1–1	3–2–2	3–2–1	Quit (Note: No vote; Julie chose to quit the game.)	6–5	5–3–2	2–0–0 (Note: Jon and Keith both played hidden immunity idols, therefore four votes against Jon and three votes against Keith were not counted.)	7–1	4–3	2–2–2	2–1–0	2–0 (Note: Natalie played a hidden immunity idol on Jaclyn, therefore three votes against Jaclyn were not counted.)	3–1
Voter	Vote																
Natalie					Drew				Josh	Keith	~~Keith~~	Reed	Alec	Jon	Jon	Baylor	Keith
Jaclyn	Dale	Baylor	Baylor	John		Kelley	Dale		Josh	Jeremy	Wes	Reed	Keith	Keith	None (Note: This player was not eligible to vote in the second round of voting.)	Baylor	Keith
Missy					Drew	Kelley	Keith		Josh	Jeremy	~~Keith~~	Reed	Alec	Jaclyn	Jaclyn	~~Jaclyn~~	Keith
Keith					Julie	Dale	Dale		Baylor	Reed	~~Jon~~	Reed	Alec	Jon	None	~~Jaclyn~~	Missy
Baylor	Nadiya	Val	None	John		Kelley	Keith		Josh	Jeremy	~~Keith~~	Reed	Alec	Jaclyn	Jon	~~Jaclyn~~	
Jon					Keith	Dale	Dale		Josh	Jeremy	Wes	Reed	Keith	Keith	None		
Alec	Nadiya	Val	Val	John					Baylor	Reed	~~Jon~~	Reed	Keith				
Reed					Julie				Baylor	Jeremy	~~Jon~~	Missy					
Wes	Nadiya	Val	Val	John					Baylor	Reed	~~Jon~~						
Jeremy					Drew				Josh	Keith							
Josh	Baylor	Val	Val	John					Baylor								
Julie					Drew			Quit									
Dale	Nadiya	Baylor	Val	Baylor		Baylor	Missy										
Kelley					Drew	Baylor											
Drew					Kelley												
John	Nadiya	Baylor	Val	Baylor													
Val	Dale	Baylor	None														
Nadiya	Dale																

Jury vote
Episode	15		
Day	39		
Finalist	Natalie	Jaclyn	Missy
Votes	5–2–1		
Juror	Vote		
Keith	Yes		
Baylor			Yes
Jon		Yes	
Alec	Yes		
Reed		Yes	
Wes	Yes		
Jeremy	Yes		
Josh	Yes		

== Production ==
=== Casting ===
The season was originally set to have 20 castaways: sisters So Kim and Doo Kim were originally cast but they dropped out before the game began due to a medical emergency. So eventually competed on the following season, Survivor: Worlds Apart. The season would continue with nine pairs, but with the first gender imbalance since Survivor: Fiji. While this season initially included Redemption Island, production ultimately decided not to use it for the season, and instead replaced it with the return of Exile Island.

On August 12, 2014, six weeks before the scheduled premiere, the post-production crew for the season went on strike, consequently endangering the premiere date. The approximately 20-person post-production team, who have been working on the show since its inception in 2000, demanded a better health insurance and pension fund. The strike ended a day later, leaving the premiere's intended airdate intact.

== Reception ==
Entertainment Weekly's Survivor columnist Dalton Ross called the cast "boring, if not boorish," and said that there were no standout moments from the season. Ross added, "This is not a season that inspires anger or rage, just apathy, which is maybe the worst indictment of all." Despite adding that the final episodes of the season were an improvement, as well as praising Anderson's post-merge gameplay, Ross ultimately ranked it as the sixth-worst season of the series, only ahead of One World, Thailand, Fiji, Nicaragua, and Island of the Idols. Survivor: Tocantins runner-up and People’s Survivor columnist Stephen Fishbach called it a "humdrum" season, and although it had "a great winner", he also called the Final Tribal Council "one of the worst in the show's history." While Tom Santilli of Examiner.com reserved some praise for aspects such as the idol plays and the memorability of Keith Nale, he said that the season "mainly consisted of a cast full of people who could only be considered as 'non-gamers,'" and ultimately concluded that "something about this season didn't quite click, and I'm afraid that most of it will be forgotten over time." Gordon Holmes of Xfinity similarly summarized: "I don't get this season. There are big, interesting moves, but it doesn't feel right. It just doesn't pop." Host Jeff Probst acknowledged the season as lackluster, especially in comparison to the previous four seasons. In response to whether or not he disliked most of the cast, he stated that "there was a lot of frustration this season", but similarly to Ross, added that "it got a lot better as it went along."

The season was ranked as the fifth-worst by Andrea Deiher of Zap2it in 2015, only ahead of Africa, Vanuatu, Thailand, and Redemption Island. In 2015, a poll by Rob Has a Podcast ranked this season 22nd out of 30, with Rob Cesternino ranking this season 15th. This was updated in 2021 during Cesternino's podcast, Survivor All-Time Top 40 Rankings, ranking 16th out of 40. In 2020, "The Purple Rock Podcast" ranked San Juan Del Sur 24th out of the 40 seasons, stating that the season "gets more interesting after the merge and has an excellent winner, but it’s hard to get past how unappealing this cast is." Later in the year, Inside Survivor likewise ranked this season 24th out of 40 calling the pre-merge "relatively unremarkable" but said that it improved after the merge with "a slew of entertaining blindsides, idol plays, and one of the all-time great winning endgames from Natalie." In 2024, Nick Caruso of TVLine ranked this season 41st out of 47.
