= Ingrid Schaffner =

American art historian

Ingrid Schaffner (born 1961) is a curator, writer, and educator specializing in contemporary art since the mid-1980s. Schaffner's work often coalesces around themes of archiving and collecting, photography, feminism, and alternate modernisms—especially Surrealism. She has curated important exhibitions that have helped studio craft to gain acceptance as fine art, such as Dirt on Delight: Impulses That Form Clay with Jenelle Porter at the Institute of Contemporary Art, Philadelphia in 2009.

== Early life and education ==
Schaffner was born in Los Gatos, California.

== Career ==
Schaffner co-authored the publication Deep Storage which was a major international survey of 50 contemporary artists representing issues and images of collecting, storage, and archiving. Other exhibitions include Pictures, Patents, Monkeys, More ... on collecting, Richard Tuttle, In Parts, 1998-2001, and The Photogenic: Photography Through its Metaphor. She has numerous publications on 20th-century art, art reviews in Artforum, and catalog essays.

Schaffner was the Chief Curator at the Institute of Contemporary Art, Philadelphia at the University of Pennsylvania from 2000 to 2015. During that time, she curated an exhibition program that included surveys devoted to Barry Le Va, Jason Rhoades and Louise Fishman. She later served as curator of 2018 Carnegie International at the Carnegie Museum of Art in Pittsburgh, Pennsylvania.

From 2020 to 2023, Schaffner served as curator at Chinati Foundation in Marfa, Texas.

In 2023, Schaffner joined Hauser & Wirth as curatorial senior director, based in Los Angeles.

== Bibliography ==
- Philbrick, Jane. (1993) The return of the Cadavre exquis. Drawing Center. ISBN 0-942324-06-4
- Nauman, Bruce; Jill Snyder; and Ingrid Schaffner. (1997) Bruce Nauman, 1985-1996 : drawings, prints, and related works. Aldrich Museum of Contemporary Art. ISBN 1-888332-05-0
- Schaffner, Ingrid; Matthias Winzen; Geoffrey Batchen; and Hubertus Gassner. (1998) Deep storage : collecting, storing, and archiving in art. Prestel. ISBN 3-7913-1920-5
- Schaffner, Ingrid; and Lisa Jacobs, eds. (1998) Julien Levy: Portrait of an Art Gallery. MIT Press. ISBN 0-262-19412-0
- Schaffner, Ingrid. (1998) The essential Vincent van Gogh. Harry N. Abrams. ISBN 0-8362-6999-3
- Feldman, Melissa E. and Ingrid Schaffner. (September 16, 1999) Secret Victorians: Contemporary Artists and a 19th-Century Vision. University of California Press. ISBN 1-85332-186-9
- Schaffner, Ingrid. (October 1999) The Essential Andy Warhol. The Essential Series. Andrews McMeel Publishing. ISBN 0-7407-0288-2
- Schaffner, Ingrid. (November 1999) The Essential Pablo Picasso. The Essential Series. Andrews McMeel Publishing. ISBN 0-8362-1934-1
- Schaffner, Ingrid. (November 1999) The Essential Henri Matisse. The Essential Series. Andrews McMeel Publishing. ISBN 0-8362-1937-6
- Schaffner, Ingrid; Hannelore Baron and Smithsonian Institution Traveling Exhibition Service. (July 2001) Hannelore Baron: Works from 1969 to 1987 Smithsonian Books. ISBN 0-86528-043-6
- Schaffner, Ingrid; Fred Wilson; and Werner Muensterberger. (2001) Pictures, patents, monkeys, and more ... on collecting. Independent Curators International. ISBN 0-916365-59-X
- Schaffner, Ingrid; Melissa E Feldman. (2001) About the Bayberry bush. Parrish Art Museum. ISBN 0-943526-48-5
- Bernstein, Charles; Richard Tuttle; and Ingrid Schaffner. (2001) Richard Tuttle, in parts, 1998-2001. Institute of Contemporary Art, University of Pennsylvania. ISBN 0-88454-098-7
- Morris, Catherine; and Ingrid Schaffner. (2002) Gloria: another look at feminist art of the 1970s. White Columns.
- Schaffner, Ingrid. (2002) Salvador Dalí's Dream of Venus: the surrealist funhouse from the 1939 World's Fair. Princeton Architectural Press. ISBN 1-56898-359-X
- Schaffner, Ingrid. (May 2003) The Essential Joseph Cornell. Harry N. Abrams. ISBN 0-8109-5833-3
- Schaffner, Ingrid. (2003) The essential Man Ray. Harry N. Abrams. ISBN 0-8109-5831-7
- Schaffner, Ingrid. (2003) Memoir of an art gallery. MFA Publications. ISBN 0-87846-653-3
- Apfelbaum, Polly; Claudia Gould; and Ingrid Schaffner. (2003) Polly Apfelbaum : Institute of Contemporary Art, University of Pennsylvania, Philadelphia, May 3-July 27, 2003. Institute of Contemporary Art, University of Pennsylvania. ISBN 0-88454-103-7
- Andrade, Edna; Debra Bricker Balken; and Ingrid Schaffner. (2003) Edna Andrade : optical paintings, 1963-1986. Institute of Contemporary Art, University of Pennsylvania. ISBN 0-88454-101-0
- Schaffner, Ingrid; Bennett Simpson; and Tanya Leighton. (2004) The big nothing. Institute of Contemporary Art, University of Pennsylvania. ISBN 0-88454-105-3
- Schaffner, Ingrid. (2004) Sarah McEneaney. Institute of Contemporary Art, University of Pennsylvania. ISBN 0-88454-104-5
- Schaffner, Ingrid. (2004) Trials and turbulence : Pepón Osorio, an artist in residence at DHS. Institute of Contemporary Art, University of Pennsylvania.
- Le Va, Barry; Ingrid Schaffner; and Rhea Anastas. (2005) Accumulated vision : Barry Le Va. Institute of Contemporary Art, University of Pennsylvania. ISBN 0-88454-106-1
- List, Larry; Ingrid Schaffner (introduction). (2005) The imagery of chess revisited. Isamu Noguchi Foundation and Garden Museum. ISBN 0-8076-1555-2
- Herrera, Arturo; Friedrich Meschede; and Ingrid Schaffner. (2005) Arturo Herrera : 7 Abril-19 Xuño de 2005. Centro Galego de Arte Contemporánea : Xunta de Galicia. ISBN 84-453-4109-X
- Marincola, Paula (editor). (2006) What makes a great exhibition? Philadelphia Exhibitions Initiative, Philadelphia Center for Arts and Heritage. ISBN 0-9708346-1-6
- Schaffner, Ingrid; Jess; John Ashbery; and Lisa Jarnot. (2007) Jess: to and from the printed page. Independent Curators International. ISBN 978-0-916365-75-2
- Kilimnik, Karen; Ingrid Schaffner and Scott Rothkopf. (2007) Karen Kilimnik. Institute of Contemporary Art, University of Pennsylvania. ISBN 9780884541103 3
- Neff, Eileen; Patrick T Murphy; and Ingrid Schaffner. (2007) Eileen Neff : between us. Institute of Contemporary Art, University of Pennsylvania. ISBN 978-0-88454-111-0
- Schaffner, Ingrid; Carin Kuoni; and John Bell. (2008) The Puppet Show. Institute of Contemporary Art, University of Pennsylvania. ISBN 978-0-88454-113-4
- Schaffner, Ingrid; and Douglas Blau. (2009) Douglas Blau. Institute of Contemporary Art, University of Pennsylvania. ISBN 978-0-88454-115-8
- Schaffner, Ingrid; Jenelle Porter; and Glenn Adamson. (2009) Dirt on Delight: impulses that form clay. Institute of Contemporary Art, University of Pennsylvania. ISBN 978-0-88454-117-2
- Schaffner, Ingrid. Maira Kalman: Various Illuminations (of a crazy world), Philadelphia: Institute of Contemporary Art, University of Pennsylvania and Delmonico Books/Prestel, 2010.
- Schaffner, Ingrid. Queer Voice, Philadelphia: Institute of Contemporary Art, University of Pennsylvania, 2010.
- Schaffner, Ingrid. Anne Tyng: Inhabiting Geometry. Philadelphia: Institute of Contemporary Art, University of Pennsylvania, 2011.
- Schaffner, Ingrid. Louise Fishman, ed. Helaine Posner. New York: Neuberger Museum of Art, Purchase College; Philadelphia: Institute for Contemporary Art, University of Pennsylvania; Delmonico Books/Prestel, 2016.
- Schaffner, Ingrid with Liz Park. Carnegie International, 57th edition, 2018: the guide. Pittsburgh, PA: Carnegie Museum of Art and Distributed Art Publishers, 2018. ISBN 9780880390637
- Schaffner, Ingrid with Liz Park. Dispatch: CI57-2018. Pittsburgh, PA: Carnegie Museum of Art, 2019. ISBN 9780880390644
