= Orchestra 2001 =

Orchestra 2001 was founded at Swarthmore College, where it was Ensemble-in-Residence for over twenty-five years. In addition to concerts in the Philadelphia area, the ensemble has brought new American music to countless new audiences through national and international tours and commercial recordings.

== History ==
As a recipient of four NEA regional touring grants, Orchestra 2001 has performed for diverse American audiences throughout rural Appalachia, the Southwest’s Navajo Nation, and for an upcoming tour to historically black colleges and universities in Alabama, Louisiana, and Mississippi. It has presented Philadelphia-area musicians and soloists with music by Philadelphia composers worldwide: performances in Denmark and England, on five tours to Russia, at the Salzburg Festival in Austria, at the Havana Festival of Contemporary Music in Cuba, on an Arabian Gulf tour to Abu Dhabi, Dubai, and Qatar, and most recently on two tours to China visiting prominent festivals and venues in Beijing, Shanghai, Nanning, Tianjin, and Hong Kong. The ensemble will tour to Mexico in Fall 2019.

The orchestra has had great influence on the lives of composers, young and old, in particular, in the relationship it has had with Pulitzer Prize-winning George Crumb. Orchestra 2001 is the pre-eminent interpreter of Mr. Crumb’s music and has performed his music at Carnegie’s Zankel Theater, Miller Theater, and Bargemusic in New York City, the Library of Congress, and the Kimmel Center. All of Mr. Crumb’s American Songbooks – his unique settings of American folksongs – were written for, premiered and recorded first by Orchestra 2001 including a 2015 Grammy nomination.

Recent seasons have included Philadelphia premieres of some of the 20th century’s most challenging works including Pierre Boulez’s Le marteau sans maître, and the first American performance of Frank Zappa’s 17 contemporary classical notated pieces known collectively as The Yellow Shark, taking place in 2018, on the 25th anniversary of their recording and Zappa’s death. Collaborations have ranged from a Renaissance band to an Indonesian dance troupe and gamelan to film and dance, at venues such as the Kimmel Center, World Cafe Live, and The Fillmore.

In 2014, Orchestra 2001 received a Knight Arts Challenge grant for “New Music Celebrations of the Life of Dr. Martin Luther King,” including outreach to three African-American communities, the premiere of From the Mountaintop, and a work with gospel choir and jazz trio.

Since founder James Freeman’s retirement in 2015, Jayce Ogren now serves as Orchestra 2001’s Conductor for larger programs.

Orchestra 2001 will partner with Northeast Philadelphia’s Teatro Esperanza for annual series programs featuring contemporary classical music from Mexico, Puerto Rico, Brazil, and Argentina. This will include an annual composer commission from each country/region beginning with a new work by Mexican composer Francisco Cortés-Álvarez in 2019, about real or imaginary barriers between Mexico and the United States.

Orchestra 2001 was selected as first music Ensemble-in-Residence at Philadelphia’s new Cherry Street Pier. Its 440 square-foot studio, located on the Pier’s ground floor serves as administrative office, rehearsal space, and home to its innovative “Composer At Work” window, funded by the Musical Fund Society of Philadelphia and a Barra Catalyst Award.
