= Sarah McEneaney =

American artist (born 1955)

- Born: January 31, 1955 (age 71); Munich, West Germany
- Education: Pennsylvania Academy of the Fine Arts, University of the Arts (Philadelphia)
- Known for: Painting
- Movement: Narrative art, Naïve art
- Awards: Pew Fellowship in the Arts, Joan Mitchell Foundation Grant

Sarah McEneaney (born January 31, 1955, in Munich, West Germany) is an American artist, painter, and community activist who lives and works in Philadelphia, Pennsylvania. Working primarily in egg tempera her paintings are characterized by their autobiographical content, detailed brushwork, and brilliant color. McEneaney's intimate subject matter focuses on daily scenes from her home, studio, travels, and neighborhood. Her work is included in public collections such as the Philadelphia Museum of Art and she has received numerous grants and awards. McEneaney is also active in community work, including the formation of the Callowhill Neighborhood Association in 2001, and the co-founding of the Reading Viaduct Project in 2003.

== Career ==
McEneaney is represented by Locks Gallery in Philadelphia and Tibor de Nagy Gallery in New York City. In 2004, the Institute of Contemporary Art, Philadelphia held a mid-career exhibition of her work accompanied by a fully illustrated publication authored by Chief Curator Ingrid Schaffner. Individual works were also discussed by 11 other contributors, including Sarah McEneaney, art historian and former Philadelphia Museum of Art curator Susan Rosenberg, artist Sheila Pepe, and poet Nathalie Anderson.

Her work is in numerous public collections including the Philadelphia Museum of Art, Mills College Art Museum, the Pennsylvania Academy of the Fine Arts, Rhode Island School of Design Museum, Woodmere Art Museum, Bryn Mawr College, Nueberger Museum at SUNY Purchase, the State Museum of Pennsylvania, the Free Library of Philadelphia, and the Hood Museum of Art at Dartmouth College.

=== Select exhibitions ===
- Studio Living (2014) Tibor de Nagy, New York, solo exhibition
- "First Look", (2013) Philadelphia Museum of Art
- Trestletown, (2013) Locks Gallery, Philadelphia, solo exhibition
- "The Female Gaze: Women Artists Making Their World", The Linda Lee Alter Collection of Art by Women, Pennsylvania Academy of the Fine Arts
- Sarah McEneaney, (2004) Institute of Contemporary Art, Philadelphia, solo exhibition
- "Memory and Mastery" (2000), List Gallery at Swarthmore College, solo exhibition
- "Sarah McEneaney" (1990) Morris Gallery at the Pennsylvania Academy of the Fine Arts, solo exhibition

== Recognition ==
In 1993, McEneaney received a Pew Fellowship in the Arts and has received subsequent grants in 2001, 2002, and 2008. In 2000, she received a prestigious Painters & Sculptors Grant from the Joan Mitchell Foundation. In 2007, she was honored by her alma mater with the Distinguished Alumni Award from the Pennsylvania Academy of Fine Arts.

== Community work ==
McEneaney’s community work includes forming the Callowhill Neighborhood Association in Philadelphia with neighbors in 2001, and co-founded the Reading Viaduct Project in 2003. The goal of the project was to preserve and renovate the Reading Viaduct, a stretch of abandoned railway that carried trains into Philadelphia’s Reading Terminal for almost 100 years, creating the neighborhood’s first park. Reading Viaduct Project merged with Friends of the Rail Park in late 2013 to form a nonprofit organization advocating for the park. McEneaney continues to act on their board of directors.
