= Natalie Anderson (television personality) =

American television personalities (born 1986)

- Born: April 11, 1986 (age 40); New York City, New York, U.S.
- Other names: Twinnie; Nat
- Occupations: TV personality, Crossfit coach, physical therapy student
- Television: The Amazing Race 21; The Amazing Race 24; Survivor: San Juan del Sur (winner); Survivor: Winners at War (runner-up); The Challenge: Double Agents; The Traitors 4

Natalie Anderson (born April 11, 1986) is an American television personality. She appeared in The Amazing Race and Survivor: San Juan del Sur. In the San Juan del Sur season, after her twin Nadiya was the first contestant eliminated, Natalie eventually became crowned Sole Survivor, winning the show's $1 million prize. Natalie also competed on Survivor: Winners at War, an all-winners season. After being voted out first, she battled her way back into the game from the Edge of Extinction twist and finished first runner-up on the season.

== Early life ==
Natalie Anderson was born in Queens alongside her twin Nadiya to a Tamil father and a Sinhalese mother. She and her family moved to Sri Lanka at age three amid the Sri Lankan Civil War. The whole family moved to West Hartford, Connecticut at age thirteen. There, she alongside Nadiya attended Hall High School, where the twins ran track and Natalie was captain of the swim team. The twins later attended Fordham University's Gabelli School of Business, where Natalie played rugby. Before participating in their own debut season of The Amazing Race, both had moved to Edgewater, New Jersey. Natalie was studying physical therapy, while Nadiya was a project coordinator for Bridge2Peace, which is an American educational charity operating in Sri Lanka.

== Television appearances ==
=== The Amazing Race ===
Natalie and Nadiya first participated in the twenty-first season of The Amazing Race, where they called each other "Twinnie". The twins won two legs during the season but were eliminated in the penultimate leg, placing them fourth. They returned in the twenty-fourth season, which was an All-Stars (all-returnees) competition, but were eliminated in the first leg of the season.

=== Survivor ===
==== San Juan del Sur ====
Natalie and Nadiya appeared as contestants on Survivor: San Juan del Sur. The twins appeared on a season that used the Blood vs. Water theme, which pitted nine pairs of loved ones against each other. Natalie was placed on the Hunahpu tribe, while Nadiya was on the Coyopa tribe, as the season's theme was pairs of loved ones competing against each other on opposing tribes. Nadiya was the first contestant eliminated from the competition. Natalie remained in the game, making it into the merged Huyopa tribe, and won three reward challenges, one individual immunity, and was sent to Exile Island twice. Anderson ultimately made it into the Final Three and was voted by the jury in a 5–2–1 vote as the Sole Survivor, winning the season's $1,000,000 grand prize.

Anderson was slated to return for Survivor: Game Changers as a member of the Nuku tribe, but she suffered a concussion and was replaced by Sierra Dawn Thomas.

==== Winners at War ====
For winning the San Juan del Sur season, Anderson re-competed on Survivor: Winners at War. She was the first person voted out, but inhabited the "Edge of Extinction" island. She spent thirty-three days on the Edge of Extinction, where she accumulated sixteen Fire Tokens, the most any player in the game received. On day thirty-five, Anderson used all of her sixteen tokens to purchase three advantages in the re-entry competition, which helped her win and re-enter the main game. On day thirty-six, she played an idol (purchased on Extinction Island) on herself, which voided four votes against her. On day thirty-seven, Anderson found an idol and played it on herself, but received no votes. She won the Final Immunity Challenge on day thirty-eight, making it to the Final Tribal Council once again. However, her gameplay was seen as safe compared to Tony's dominant gameplay, and she finished as the runner up to him in a 12-4-0 vote.

Her twin Nadiya arrived to visit Anderson on the loved ones' visit during the tenth episode.

=== Other television appearances ===
In 2016, Anderson appeared in a special episode of The Price Is Right which featured multiple former Survivor contestants competing on the show. The episode aired on May 23, 2016.

Anderson competed on the thirty-sixth season of The Challenge in 2020. She was initially paired with Wes Bergmann and was voted into elimination in episode one, where she defeated opponent Ashley Mitchell. Anderson was deemed medically unable to continue in the competition, withdrawing in episode 5, after learning that she was pregnant. The following week, she had a miscarriage.

Anderson competed on the fourth season of The Traitors in 2025. She was chosen to play as a Faithful at the beginning of the game, and was banished in the penultimate episode.

== Political views ==
Anderson endorsed Zohran Mamdani for the 2025 New York City mayoral election. She appeared in a Survivor Tribal Council-style voting against Andrew Cuomo alongside Yam Yam Arocho, Katurah Topps, Stephanie Berger, Teeny Chirichillo, Brandon Donlon, Jacob Derwin, Maddy Pomilla, and Josh Canfield in an endorsement ad for Mamdani.

== Filmography ==
=== Television ===
Year	Title	Notes
2012	The Amazing Race 21	4th Place
2014	The Amazing Race: All-Stars	11th Place
2014	Survivor: San Juan del Sur — Blood vs. Water	Winner
2016	The Price Is Right	1 episode
2020	Survivor: Winners at War	Runner-up
2020–21	The Challenge: Double Agents	Medically Disqualified
2026	The Traitors 4	7th Place

=== Music videos ===
Year	Title	Artist	Role(s)
2026	"How the Fire Started"	Eric Nam	The Iron Mare

Preceded by Tony Vlachos	Winner of Survivor; Survivor: San Juan del Sur	Succeeded by Mike Holloway
Preceded by Dean Kowalski	Runner-Up of Survivor; Survivor: Winners at War	Succeeded by Deshawn Radden
