= Jeff Varner =

American reality television contestant, real estate agent and news anchor (born 1966)

- Born: Jeffrey Keith Varner; April 16, 1966 (age 60); Greensboro, North Carolina
- Television: Survivor: The Australian Outback; Survivor: Cambodia; Survivor: Game Changers

Jeffrey Keith Varner (born April 16, 1966) is an American news anchor and reporter. He was a contestant on three seasons of the CBS reality television series, Survivor: The Australian Outback, Survivor: Cambodia, and Survivor: Game Changers. In 2017, he publicly outed fellow Survivor: Game Changers contestant Zeke Smith as transgender.

== Early life ==
Jeff Varner was raised on a tobacco farm in Greensboro, North Carolina. An extensive genealogical search discovered that Varner and Edward R. Murrow are related by marriage on Murrow's mother's side of the tree. He played right defense for a team in the local youth ice hockey league, and earned his black belt in Tae Kwon Do at the age of 15. He attended Southern Guilford High School, where he was active in student government and theatre arts and editor of the school's yearbook; he later went on to earn a journalism degree from the University of North Carolina at Chapel Hill.

== Survivor ==
=== The Australian Outback ===
Varner was a contestant on Survivor: The Australian Outback, 2001. He was a member of the Kucha tribe, and made it to the merge, but not the core group of nine, as there was a tie between him and Colby Donaldson. At the time, in the event of a tie, previous tribal council votes would be used. Because Keith Famie and Tina Wesson knew this, and Tina had no votes against her before while Keith had several of them (mostly from Jerri Manthey and her allies), Keith's request to Tina when they had both lasted for hours in the Immunity challenge and were the last two players standing (phrased as "I need this") led to Tina ending her run so that Keith was safe, and giving Kucha no one to vote for who had more votes than Varner: Jeff had two but knew only of one, while Colby had zero. It was revealed on the Survivor: Australia DVD, in the special commentary section, that it was Kimmi Kappenberg that inadvertently gave away the vote he had against him during the Episode Two Reward Challenge. This is also mentioned by Varner in the episode in which he was voted off, early in the episode while the Kucha tribe is talking in their shelter at night.

During the show, Varner's luxury item was a coloring book and a set of crayons. The castaways colored in the books and signed their autographs in it, and after the show, he sold the pictures on eBay to raise money for charities.

=== Cambodia ===
On May 6, 2015, Varner was revealed to be one of the 16 men who was eligible to be voted by the viewers to return for the 31st season, Survivor: Cambodia. On May 20, the results revealed that both Varner and Kappenberg from The Australian Outback were voted to return. It was revealed that Varner had been part of a pre-game alliance prior to the start of filming, with three other players: Terry Deitz and Shane Powers of Survivor: Panama, and Kelly Wiglesworth of Survivor: Borneo. Although Powers did not make it into the season, Deitz and Wiglesworth did, and the two of them ended up with Varner on the same Ta Keo tribe. Early in the game, Varner was seen as a crucial player in the season: He and Peih-Gee Law from Survivor: China were the swing votes who ultimately decided the elimination of Vytas Baskauskas on Day Three, and Varner himself organized the elimination of Shirin Oskooi on Day Six. However, after a tribal swap and expansion turned the two tribes into three, Varner and Law ended up on the brand new Angkor tribe, along with fellow former Ta Keo members Yung "Woo" Hwang and Abi-Maria Gomes, and two new members from the former Bayon tribe, Latasha "Tasha" Fox and Andrew Savage. Although Varner initially planned to simply stay with his former Ta Keo allies, Fox suddenly realized this was his plan after they lost the immunity challenge and called Varner "a rat" in front of the other tribes. As a result, Varner began to panic and decided to turn on one of his own allies, ultimately voting with the majority to send Law home on Day Nine. After their tribe lost again on Day 11, Varner was eliminated in a unanimous vote, placing 17th in the overall competition.

=== Game Changers ===
On February 8, 2017, it was revealed that Varner was one of 20 contestants who would be competing on Survivor: Game Changers, the show's 34th season. He was initially placed on the Mana tribe. At the first Tribal Council, he joined the majority in voting out Ciera Eastin. At Mana's second Tribal Council, he joined the majority in voting out Survivor: Cagayan winner Tony Vlachos. Varner, along with Sandra Diaz-Twine, Malcolm Freberg, Aubry Bracco, and Michaela Bradshaw were then switched to Nuku. They joined original Nuku member James "J. T." Thomas, Jr., winner of Survivor: Tocantins. At the fifth Tribal Council, Varner joined Diaz-Twine and Bradshaw in blindsiding Thomas. Varner and Diaz-Twine remained on Nuku after the second tribe switch, but were excluded from the alliance of new members Ozzy Lusth, Andrea Boehlke, Tai Trang, Sarah Lacina and Zeke Smith. At Tribal Council, both Varner and Diaz-Twine voted for Trang, but the rest voted against Diaz-Twine, thus sending her out of the game for the first time in her Survivor career. She was replaced on Nuku by the recently exiled Debbie Wanner.

==== Zeke Smith outing controversy ====
Before the final pre-merge Tribal Council, Varner tried to convince Lacina, Wanner, and Boehlke to vote out Lusth, by saying that Smith was deceiving the tribe about his relationship with Lusth. At Tribal Council, Varner asked Smith, "Why haven't you told anyone you're transgender?" Varner said he thought that Smith had been open about his identity with everyone back home, but was trying to conceal it to his tribemates in the game. However, this backfired as it became evident that Smith had never revealed his being transgender publicly. All of the other tribemates disregarded their alliances for the evening to admonish Varner and support Smith. Many were in tears as the Tribal Council played out, and even Jeff Probst came to Smith's defense. In the end, Probst asked the rest of the tribe if they are set on voting out Varner, and they said yes, thus sending him out of the game without the usual written-vote style of elimination.

Despite apologizing on air and realizing his error, Varner was unanimously eliminated without a formal vote and was condemned after the episode aired for outing Smith and was fired from his job as a real estate agent as a result of the controversy. During his exit interview, he stated that no one on Survivor should do what he did. However, he revealed at the reunion that he got hired at a new real estate agency.

== Journalism career ==
Varner was, until September 2014, main anchor at WNCT-TV, the CBS affiliate in Greenville, North Carolina. Prior, he worked as a general assignment reporter for WPIX-11, the CW's flagship station in New York City. He has worked as an entertainment reporter for KCBS in Los Angeles then E! News Live, and then as a field correspondent and host for the TV Guide Channel. He was a weekend anchor and reporter at FOX 8 WGHP in High Point, North Carolina. Varner has been a fill-in host for Live with Regis and Kelly and also worked for many years as morning anchor at WWMT Channel 3 in Kalamazoo, MI before being promoted to main anchor. He held that chair until he left the station in April 2011.

Varner began his career in communications as a public relations assistant and corporate communications manager for Citicorp in New York City. He was part of the first team in the corporate world to utilize the internet to communicate project information in Citicorp's "Product Design and Development Division."

Varner used his communications background to transition into web development, working in developing online properties for Citibank, MCI, Harlequin Romance, and Martha Stewart Living Online.
