= Troy Robertson =

American photographer and reality television star

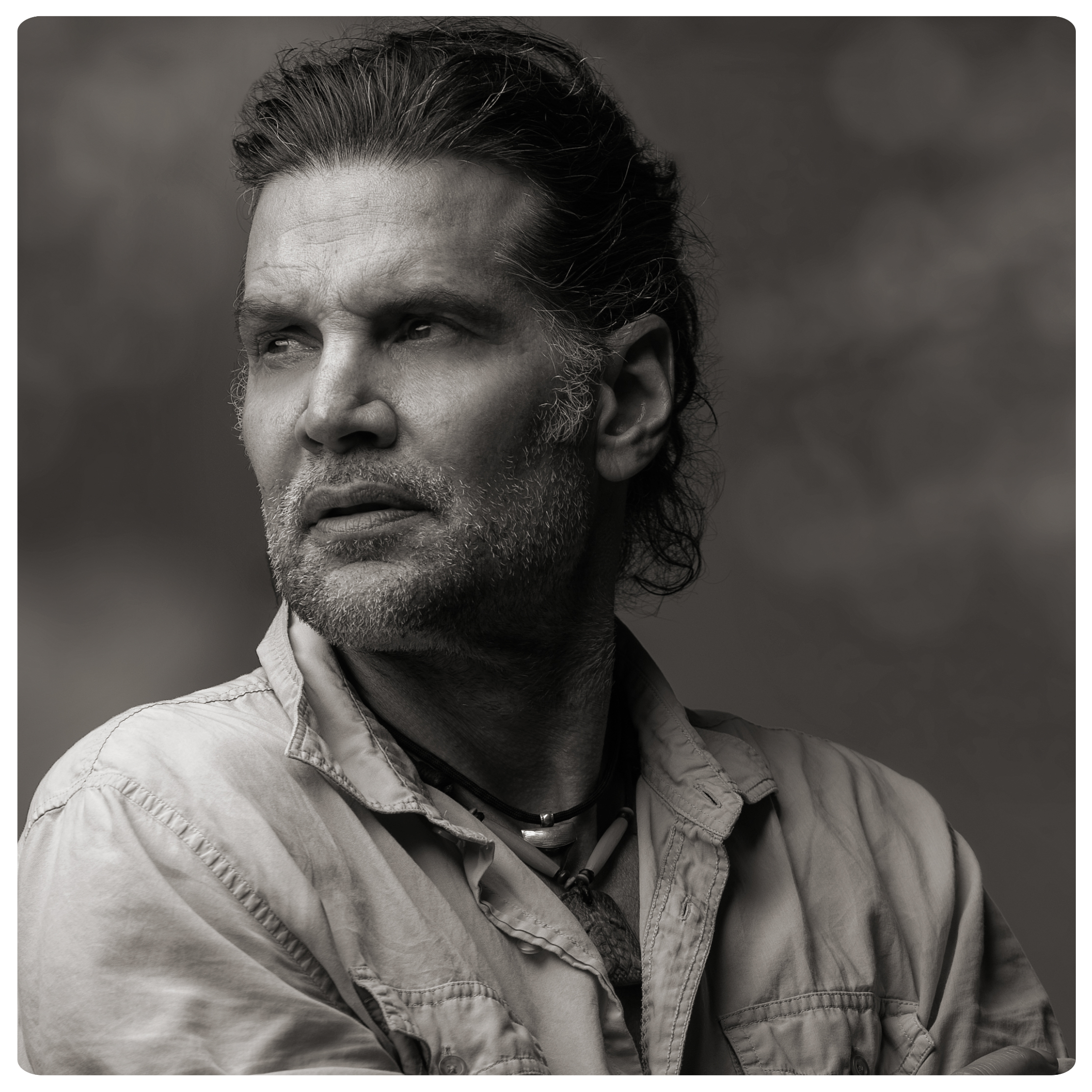
- Robertson in 2018
- Born: July 30, 1961 (age 65); Ellensburg, Washington, US
- Other name: Troyzan
- Education: Western Washington University
- Occupations: Photographer, model, reality television star
- Years active: 1983–present
- Television: Survivor: One World; Survivor: Game Changers
- Website: www.troyrobertson.com

Troy Robertson (born July 30, 1961) is an American photographer and reality television star best known for competing on Survivor: One World, the 24th season of Survivor. On the show, he was known by his nickname, Troyzan. He would later return to Survivor for its 34th season, Survivor: Game Changers.

== Early life and career ==
Robertson was born in Ellensburg, Washington, a small town in Kittitas County, and grew up spending his childhood in eastern Washington State. He attended Central Valley High School in Spokane, during which time he began developing a lifelong interest in photography. He graduated from Central Valley High in 1979. He bought his first camera at the age of 17 and soon he became a self-taught photographer.

After high school, Robertson briefly attended Western Washington University to study The Arts. In 1983, he travelled to Guatemala to photograph the native tribes living in the rainforest. Soon after, he began a career as a model, living in Europe while travelling all over the world on assignments. In the early 1990s, he was living in Barcelona, but moved to Miami, Florida, to resume his photography career.

Robertson's photography has been featured in such publications as Sports Illustrated. Much of his work has ended up in the magazine's annual swimsuit issue, for which he has photographed such swimsuit models as Kate Upton, Chrissy Teigen, Brooklyn Decker, Bar Refaeli, and Nina Agdal.

== Survivor ==
In 2012, Robertson was one of 18 castaways who competed on Survivor: One World, the 24th season of the American reality TV series Survivor. Three years later, he was one of the finalists in the fan vote, which would decide the cast of Survivor: Cambodia; he was ultimately not chosen. In 2017, he finally returned to Survivor for its 34th season, Survivor: Game Changers.

=== One World ===
On his first season of Survivor, Robertson, known as "Troyzan" to his fellow castaways, began the game on Manono, an all-male tribe competing against Salani, the all-female tribe. His first alliance in the game was with Colton Cumbie, Leif Manson, Jonas Otsuji, and the similarly-nicknamed Greg "Tarzan" Smith. At the tribal swap, Robertson was switched to the Salani tribe, along with tribemates Jay Byars and Michael Jefferson. While on Salani, Robertson made a new alliance with Byars, Chelsea Meissner, and Kim Spradlin. On Night 17, both tribes merged.

Robertson won immunity in the season's first individual immunity challenge. At that night's Tribal Council, he voted with his post-swap alliance to eliminate Otsuji. Knowing that the women now had the numbers advantage, the men considered voting out Christina Cha next. However, Spradlin deceived Robertson by claiming that Jefferson wanted him out, leading Robertson to join the women in voting to eliminate Jefferson.

By Day 25, Robertson had become suspicious of Spradlin, so that night, fearing that the women were going to oust him next, he played a Hidden Immunity Idol he had found, negating two votes against him. But Byers was eliminated with five votes, making Robertson's idol play moot. On Day 27, Robertson again won individual immunity, after which he celebrated his victory by exclaiming, "This is MY island!" But on Day 30, he failed to win immunity again, and at that night's Tribal Council, he was voted out in eighth place as the eleventh person eliminated from the season, making him the fifth member of the jury.

At the Final Tribal Council, in the jury vote to decide who would win Sole Survivor, Robertson voted for Sabrina Thompson, who beat Meissner, but lost to Spradlin, in a 7–2–0 vote.

=== Game Changers ===
In his return to Survivor, Robertson started the game on the Mana Tribe. At the tribal swap on Day Seven, he was switched to Tavua, a brand-new tribe on which he was the only original Mana member. While on Tavua, he found a clue to the Hidden Immunity Idol, and he managed to find it when no one was looking. Tavua dominated the next few challenges, but he was switched back to Mana after the second tribe switch. On the new Mana tribe, he aligned with Brad Culpepper, whose wife Monica Culpepper had competed against Robertson on One World.

Following the merge, Robertson would go on to win immunity on Day 25. On Night 35, he, Culpepper, and Sarah Lacina successfully blindsided Michaela Bradshaw. On Day 36, Culpepper won immunity and a reward, choosing to share the reward with Robertson and Lacina. On the reward, the three agreed to target Tai Trang next. At the Final Six Tribal Council that night, Trang, who had two idols, played both of them: one on himself and one on Aubry Bracco. Then Lacina played her Legacy Advantage, which also granted her immunity, prompting Robertson to "get on the immunity train" and play his idol as well. This left Cirie Fields as the only player left without immunity; thus Fields was eliminated by default.

Ultimately, Robertson made it to the Final Tribal Council, along with Lacina and Culpepper; sadly, Robertson was mostly ignored by the jury, who accused him of being Culpepper's follower. However, Robertson maintained that he had built personal connections with everyone and made subtle strategic moves. Ultimately, he finished third, receiving no jury votes, losing to Culpepper, who placed second with three votes, and Lacina, who won Sole Survivor with seven votes.

== Personal life ==
Robertson resides in South Florida "on 10 acres of Miami jungle," along with the 12 marmoset monkeys he adopted. "Troyzan," as Robertson is known, is a self-described "jungle boy," saying, "I've lived my life as an adventure, and I'm extremely in touch with nature. I've been a jungle boy my whole life"
