= Survivor: One World =

- Season 24
- Region 1 DVD cover
- Presented by: Jeff Probst
- No. of days: 39
- No. of castaways: 18
- Winner: Kim Spradlin
- Runner-up: Sabrina Thompson
- Location: Upolu, Samoa
- Sprint Player of the Season: Kim Spradlin
- No. of episodes: 15

Release
- Original network: CBS
- Original release: February 15 – May 13, 2012

Additional information
- Filming dates: August 1 – September 8, 2011

Season chronology
- ← Previous; South Pacific Next → Philippines

Survivor: One World is the 24th season of the American CBS competitive reality television series Survivor, featuring 18 new castaways, divided by gender into two tribes of nine. The season was filmed from August 1 through September 8, 2011, in the vicinity of Upolu, Samoa, which is the same filming location used for seasons 19, 20, and 23, at the time surpassed Panama as the location where the most Survivor seasons had filmed. The season aired weekly from February 15, 2012, until May 13, 2012, when Kim Spradlin was named the winner over Sabrina Thompson and Chelsea Meissner by a 7–2–0 vote. In addition, Spradlin won $100,000 as the "Sprint Player of the Season," earning the fans' vote over runners-up, Meissner, Greg "Tarzan" Smith, and "Troyzan" Robertson.

== Format ==
Survivor is a reality television show based on the Swedish show Expedition Robinson, created by Mark Burnett and Charlie Parsons. The series follows a number of participants isolated in a remote location, where they must provide food, fire, and shelter. One participant is removed from the series by majority vote every three days, with challenges held to give a reward (ranging from living- and food-related prizes to a car) and immunity from being voted out of the series. The last remaining player receives a prize of $1,000,000.

== Contestants ==
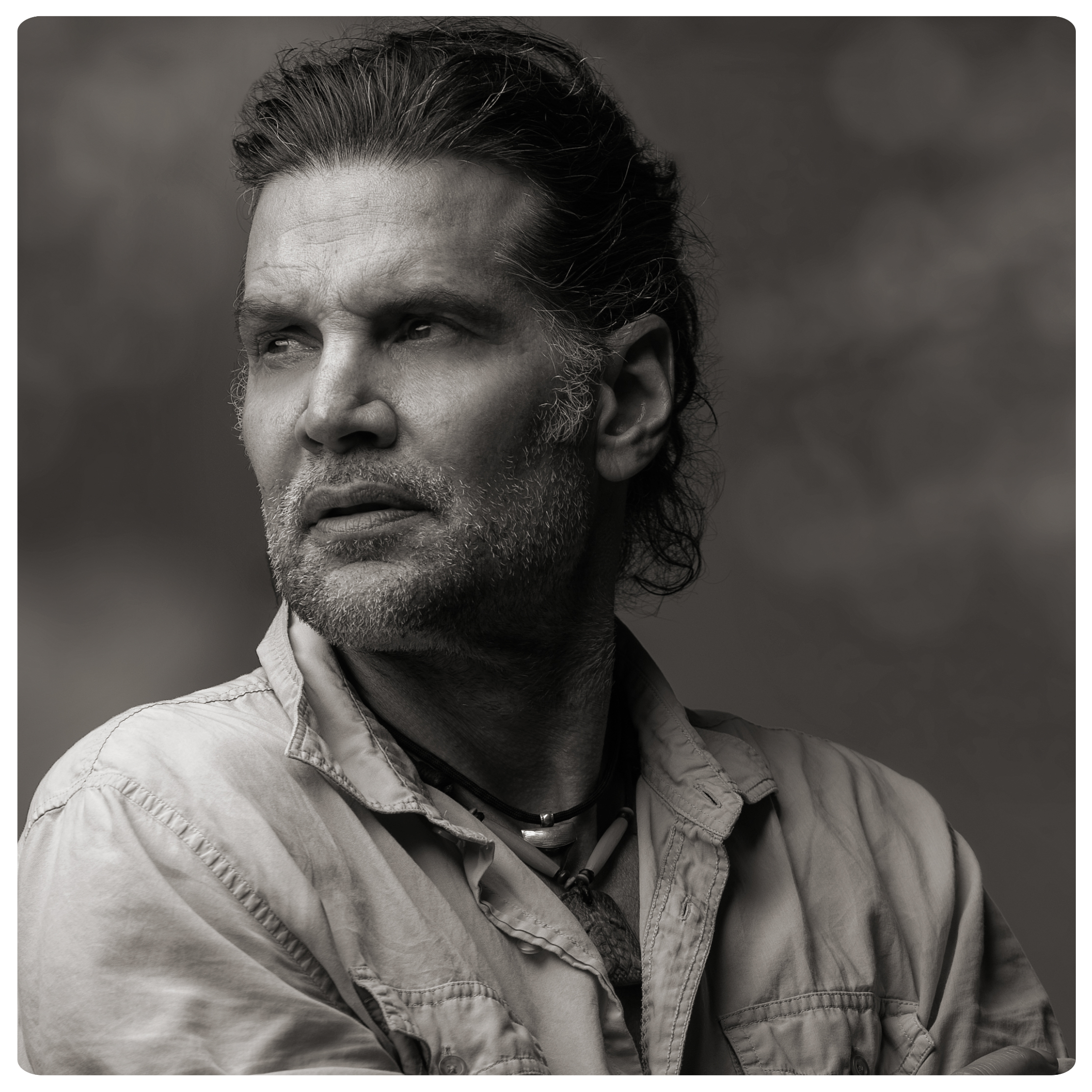
Troy "Troyzan" Robertson

The cast is composed of 18 new players, initially divided into two tribes by gender: the nine men composed Manono (named after Manono Island) while the nine women composed Salani (named after a Samoan surfing resort). The merged tribe Tikiano is coined from a portmanteau of "Tiki" which means "God", and "Ano" derived from Spanish año for "year", which was first suggested by contestant Troy "Troyzan" Robertson.

Notable cast members include Leif Manson, the first little person to compete in the whole Survivor franchise; fashion photographer "Troyzan" Robertson; and Monica Culpepper, wife of former NFL football player Brad Culpepper (who would later compete against Monica on Blood vs. Water).

List of Survivor: One World contestants
Contestant	Age	From	Tribe			Finish	
Contestant	Age	From	Original	Switched	Merged	Placement	Day
Kourtney Moon	29	Austin, Texas	Salani			Medically evacuated	Day 3
Nina Acosta	51	Clovis, California	Salani			1st voted out	Day 5
Matt Quinlan	33	San Francisco, California	Manono			2nd voted out	Day 8
Bill Posley	28	Venice, California	Manono			3rd voted out	Day 11
Monica Culpepper	41	Tampa, Florida	Salani	Manono		4th voted out	Day 14
Colton Cumbie	21	Monroeville, Alabama	Manono	Manono		Medically evacuated	Day 16
Jonas Otsuji	37	Lehi, Utah	Manono	Manono	Tikiano	5th voted out 1st jury member	Day 20
Michael Jefferson	30	Seattle, Washington	Manono	Salani	Tikiano	6th voted out 2nd jury member	Day 22
James "Jay" Byars	25	Gaffney, South Carolina	Manono	Salani	Tikiano	7th voted out 3rd jury member	Day 25
Leif Manson	27	San Diego, California	Manono	Manono	Tikiano	8th voted out 4th jury member	Day 27
Troy "Troyzan" Robertson	50	Miami, Florida	Manono	Salani	Tikiano	9th voted out 5th jury member	Day 30
Katrina "Kat" Edorsson	22	Orlando, Florida	Salani	Salani	Tikiano	10th voted out 6th jury member	Day 33
Greg "Tarzan" Smith	64	Houston, Texas	Manono	Manono	Tikiano	11th voted out 7th jury member	Day 36
Alicia Rosa	25	Chicago, Illinois	Salani	Manono	Tikiano	12th voted out 8th jury member	Day 37
Christina Cha	29	Hollywood, California	Salani	Manono	Tikiano	13th voted out 9th jury member	Day 38
Chelsea Meissner	26	Charleston, South Carolina	Salani	Salani	Tikiano	2nd Runner-up	Day 39
Sabrina Thompson	33	Brooklyn, New York	Salani	Salani	Tikiano	Runner-up	Day 39
Kim Spradlin	29	San Antonio, Texas	Salani	Salani	Tikiano	Sole Survivor	Day 39

=== Future appearances ===
Kat Edorsson, Colton Cumbie, and Monica Culpepper returned for Survivor: Blood vs. Water. Edorsson returned with her boyfriend, Hayden Moss, the winner of Big Brother 12; Cumbie returned with his fiancé, Caleb Bankston; and Culpepper returned with her husband, Brad, a former NFL player. Troy "Troyzan" Robertson and Sabrina Thompson were both included in the public poll to choose the cast of Survivor: Cambodia, but neither of them were chosen to compete. Robertson would eventually return for Survivor: Game Changers. Culpepper also appeared on Survivor: Game Changers as part of the loved ones visit. Kim Spradlin, now using her married name of Spradlin-Wolfe, returned to compete on Survivor: Winners at War.

Outside of Survivor, Michael Jefferson appeared on the Discovery Channel show Naked and Afraid. Chelsea Meissner also went on to join the cast of the Bravo show Southern Charm as a guest appearance in seasons 3 and 4, before being promoted to the main cast for seasons 5 and 6. From 2022 to 2024, Kim Spradlin-Wolfe hosted the home renovation show Why the Heck Did I Buy This House? on HGTV. In 2026, Spradlin-Wolfe and Meissner competed on the HGTV show Rock the Block.

== Season summary ==
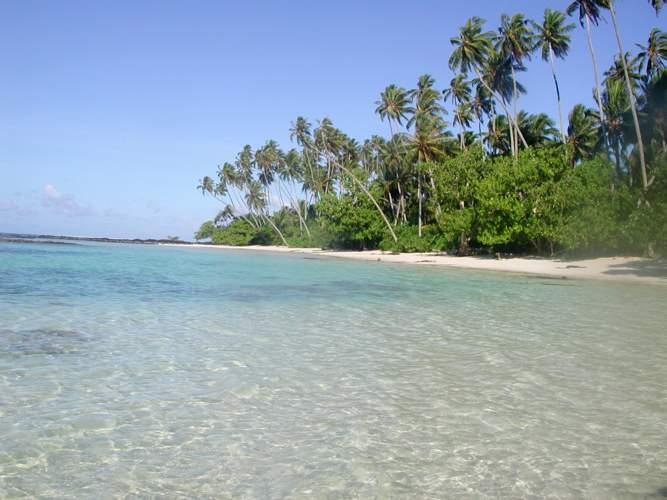
The season filmed in Upolu in Samoa.

The 18 castaways were divided into gender-based tribes and given maps to their camps, unaware they would lead to the same location. Despite living on the same beach, the tribes would remain split, building separate shelters and fending for their own tribe.

The men's tribe, Manono, dominated the first few challenges. The women's tribe, Salani, was run by a majority alliance formed by Alicia, Chelsea, Kat, Kim and Sabrina. Despite a strong start, the men found difficulty with the outspoken Colton who was initially an outsider, often interacting with Salani instead. After Sabrina accidentally found Manono's hidden immunity idol, she gave it to Colton, who used his newfound power to overthrow Manono's dominant alliance and gain control of the tribe. After the tribes were swapped, Colton found himself again in a position of power on the new Manono tribe; however, he was medically evacuated from the game after being diagnosed with acute appendicitis. Meanwhile, on the new Salani tribe, Kim and Chelsea formed a second alliance with Jay and Troyzan as a backup plan in case their original alliance failed.

Though the genders entered the merge with equal numbers, Kim organized the women into a single alliance while Colton's removal left the men without a leader, leading Jay and Troyzan to align with the women and vote out two of the men. With a clear majority, the women decided to sever ties with Jay and Troyzan, voting them out despite Troyzan's pleas to Kat and Christina, who were at the bottom of the women's alliance. Tarzan was the last man remaining, however Kat's unpredictability and youthful naivety was enough to convince Kim to betray her first. With only six players remaining, Kim found herself caught between her initial alliance of Chelsea and Sabrina, and the alliance of Alicia, Christina and Tarzan. Although Alicia wanted to vote Chelsea out, Kim convinced Alicia that Tarzan was planning to betray her, leading to Tarzan's elimination. Alicia and Christina were subsequently voted out by Kim, Chelsea, and Sabrina.

At the Final Tribal Council, Chelsea was lambasted by the jurors for her evident lack of social connections, riding on coattails, and was largely seen as Kim's pawn. Sabrina was praised for her excellent social game, and being loyal to her allies. However, she was criticized by many jurors due to her poor work ethic and challenge performances. Kim was praised for her challenge wins, her connections with men and women, and always thinking ahead strategically. However, she was blamed for all their blindsides and eliminations. Kim decided to own every decision she made throughout the entire game, and won in a vote of 7-2-0, only losing Troyzan's and Leif's votes.

Challenge winners and eliminations by episode
Episode			Challenge winner(s)		Eliminated	
No.	Title	Original air date	Reward	Immunity	Tribe	Player
1	"Two Tribes, One Camp, No Rules"	February 15, 2012	Manono (Note: Kourtney suffered an injury during the challenge; as a result, the challenge was not completed. Manono won by default and that night's Tribal Council resulted in the announcement of Kourtney being pulled from the game and no additional castaway voted off.)		Salani	Kourtney
2	"Total Dysfunction"	February 22, 2012	Manono	Manono	Salani	Nina
3	"One World is Out the Window"	February 29, 2012	Salani	Salani	Manono	Matt
4	"Bum-Puzzled"	March 7, 2012	Salani	~~Manono~~ (Note: Manono chose to give immunity to Salani before Tribal Council.)	Manono	Bill
4	"Bum-Puzzled"	March 7, 2012	Salani	Salani	Manono	Bill
5	"A Bunch of Idiots"	March 14, 2012	Salani	Salani	Manono	Monica
6	"Thanks for the Souvenir"	March 21, 2012	Salani	None (Note: Due to Colton being evacuated from the game, there was no immunity challenge or Tribal Council vote.)	Manono	Colton
7	"The Beauty in a Merge"	March 28, 2012	Alicia, Chelsea, Christina, Jay, Sabrina, Troyzan	Troyzan	Tikiano	Jonas
8	"Just Annihilate Them"	April 4, 2012	Christina, Kim, Leif, Michael, Sabrina	Jay	Tikiano	Michael
9	"Go Out With a Bang"	April 11, 2012	Alicia, Jay, Kat, Tarzan, Troyzan	Chelsea	Tikiano	Jay
10	"I'm No Dummy"	April 18, 2012	Survivor Auction	Troyzan	Tikiano	Leif
11	"Never Say Die"	April 25, 2012	Kim [Alicia, Chelsea]	Kim	Tikiano	Troyzan
12	"It's Gonna Be Chaos"	May 2, 2012	Kat [Alicia, Kim]	Kim	Tikiano	Kat
13	"It's Human Nature"	May 9, 2012	Chelsea [Kim, Sabrina]	Alicia	Tikiano	Tarzan
14	"Perception is Not Always Reality"	May 13, 2012	None	Kim	Tikiano	Alicia
14	"Perception is Not Always Reality"	May 13, 2012	None	Kim	Tikiano	Christina
15	"Reunion"	May 13, 2012				

In the case of multiple tribes or castaways who win reward or immunity, they are listed in order of finish, or alphabetically where it was a team effort; where one castaway won and invited others, the invitees are in brackets.

== Episodes ==
No. overall	No. in season	Title	Rating/share (household)	Rating/share (18-49)	Original release date	U.S. viewers (millions)	Weekly rank
352	1	"Two Tribes, One Camp, No Rules"	6.3/10	3.1/9	February 15, 2012	10.79	#17
On Day 1, the eighteen castaways arrived on a truck at a beach. Jeff divided the tribes into men, Manono, versus women, Salani. Jeff revealed the existence of the Hidden Immunity Idol and that Redemption Island will not be used this season after being used in the last two seasons. Jeff then told the tribes that they had sixty seconds to strip everything of value from the truck. While the women of Salani were busy gathering goods, Michael stole several of their assembled supplies. After the scramble for supplies was done, Jeff tossed the two tribes a map to their camps and the tribes headed off in different directions. During Salani's trek through the jungle, Alicia formed an alliance with Chelsea, Kat, Kim, and Sabrina. The women arrived first and discovered the two tribes were camping on the same beach. Later the first day, Matt warned Colton that either he could use his "women" connection to advance the Manono tribe or find himself the odd man out and be one of the first to be voted out. Matt also formed an alliance with Bill, Jay, and Michael. After Jay got Manono's fire started, the women tried to negotiate with the men for fire, but their efforts failed. Late that night, Monica and Christina crept into Manono's camp and stole an ember to start a fire, but the fire died out by morning. On Day 2, Christina brokered a deal with the men for fire in exchange for weaving twenty palm fronds for the men. While Alicia agreed to the deal, Christina's bargaining upset her and she vowed to vote out Christina first. Sabrina found a Hidden Immunity Idol intended for the Manono tribe. Before the next Tribal Council, Sabrina gave the idol to Colton, telling him to make a big move in the game.: Reward/Immunity Challenge: One at a time, the castaways would jump from a 25-foot (7.6 m) high tower into a net below. Once all of the tribe's castaways complete the jump, the tribe would move on to cross a balance beam and after that a rope bridge. The first tribe to have all of their members across the rope bridge and their tribe flag raised would win immunity and flint.; At the combined Reward/Immunity Challenge, Kourtney injured her wrist while landing in the net during the tower jump. When Jeff noticed that Kourtney was kneeling and in obvious pain while waiting her turn on the balance beam, he called a stop to the challenge to tend to Kourtney. The Survivor Medical Team determined that she had a possible broken wrist and pulled her from the challenge to get an X-ray for further diagnosis. Jeff told the tribes that since the challenge requires nine castaways to start and finish, Manono wins by default. However, he gave the men the option to continue the challenge with a nine versus eight competition as a gesture of goodwill. The men declined and took the Tribal Immunity, much to the disappointment of the women. That night, at Tribal Council, a vicious argument broke out between Alicia and Christina over the deal made over the fire and palm frond mats. Jeff told the women that Kourtney suffered multiple fractures of her wrist that would require surgery, she was medically removed from the game, and they would not have to vote anybody out. They received flint.
353	2	"Total Dysfunction"	6.0/10	2.8/8	February 22, 2012	10.29	#23
When Alicia and Christina returned to camp after Tribal Council, the two tried to clear their mutual animosity. Alicia still did not care for Christina but she focused on Nina to be voted out next as her alliance needed Christina to win challenges. On the morning of Day 4, Sabrina was appointed the leader of the tribe. The day's tree mail had two large crates for the tribes and instructions to take them to a neutral location where they were to be opened. The tribes opened the instruction package and it told them that this would be the first do-it-yourself Reward Challenge. Bill read the challenge rules and the tribes began.: Reward Challenge: The tribes would untie a series of knotted ropes to free a metal ring. The first tribe to free the ring would win a tarp along with the rope and crate from the challenge.; The challenge was closely fought with Manono pulling out the win. Afterward, the men worked on improving their camp but Colton hung out with Salani. The women shooed Colton away to have a women-only meeting. He returned later to tell them he felt alone in the game and that he wanted to spend as much time with the women as he could. The women told him that was not an option for strategic reasons. Later that night, Colton told Jonas, Leif, Tarzan, and Troyzan that he was going to play the Hidden Immunity Idol at the next Tribal Council and that they could blindside Matt or Michael. Colton decided to go along with this "misfit alliance" until he could join up with the women.: Immunity Challenge: The tribes would line up side-by-side on a balance beam out in the ocean. One at a time and starting with the castaway furthest from the finish platform, the castaway would have to move across the balance beam and around the other tribe members. Should any three castaways touch each other at the same time, the crossing castaway would have to jump into the ocean and start over from the beginning. Should the crossing castaway fall into the ocean, they would have to start over from the beginning. The first tribe to have all of their members on the finish platform would win. Challenge from Survivor Vanuatu.; At the Immunity Challenge, Manono easily defeated Salani. The women struggled from the start; only getting Monica across to the finish platform by the time the men completed the challenge. Back at camp, Kat apologized to the tribe for her over enthusiasm at taking the lead spot in the challenge and struggling in that spot until Monica took over. Nina told Chelsea that Kat was the weakest link in the tribe and that the tribe should vote for Kat. Chelsea told Kim that she agreed with Nina's assessment, but was concerned about picking off members of their alliance so early in the game. At Tribal Council, the tribe discussed what life experiences Kat and Nina brought to the tribe and the alliance of five. When the voting came, the alliance of five stuck together, voting Nina out.
354	3	"One World Is Out the Window"	6.2/10	2.9/8	February 29, 2012	10.65	#17
With a massive storm heading in, Colton and Jonas stopped by the women's camp the night after Tribal Council to see if the women wanted to stay in the men's shelter. However, the women decided to tough it out and got pounded throughout the night by the storm. The next morning, the women went over to the men's camp to warm up.: Reward Challenge: Facing off in a one-on-one competition, a castaway from each tribe would memorize a series of items at a station. Once a castaway thought they had the series memorized, they would pull a handle, concealing the items. The two castaways would then run to a second station to duplicate the memorized series. When a castaway thought they had the sequences correct, they would move to a finish station for validation by Jeff. The first castaway to correctly duplicate the series would score a point for their tribe. If neither castaway got the series correct, the castaways would repeat the process until one of them succeeded. The first tribe to score five points wins fishing gear and a canoe with paddles.; At a rainy Reward Challenge, Sabrina defeated Matt, Monica defeated Colton, Alicia defeated Jay, Kat defeated Troyzan after seven tries, and Christina defeated Bill to sweep the challenge for Salani. As a second storm rolled into the campsites, several of the women went to the men's camp to get fire and shelter, which annoyed the men. When the men asked for the use of the canoe in return for fire and shelter, the women declined to agree to any deal.: Immunity Challenge: One member from each tribe would work as a caller to guide three pairs of blindfolded fellow castaways around an obstacle course to pull a rope attached to a bucket at five water towers. The buckets would release a puzzle bag. Once all five puzzle bags are retrieved, the caller would assemble the puzzle. The first caller to assemble the puzzle would win for their tribe.; At the Immunity Challenge, Manono had a huge lead, but Sabrina managed to assemble the puzzle before Bill, with the help of other Salani members. Back at camp, the misfit alliance debated over voting out Matt or Bill. Colton wanted to vote out Bill but Tarzan suggested Matt for being the most dangerous player. When Jay stopped by to see what the misfit alliance was talking about, they invited him to vote with them. Outnumbered, he agreed to join their voting bloc. When Matt arrived, the six of them got quiet, so he left. He then tried to re-establish his perceived power in the tribe by trying to strike a deal with Troyzan, but it backfired on him as the proposal annoyed Troyzan. At Tribal Council, Colton told the tribe that he had a Hidden Immunity Idol and that he was going to play it. When the vote came, Colton did not play the idol as the misfit alliance, plus Jay and Bill, all voted Matt out.
355	4	"Bum-Puzzled"	6.3/10	3.2/9	March 7, 2012	10.78	#12
When Manono returned to camp, Tarzan and Troyzan celebrated their blindside of Matt and agreed to target Bill next. On day 9, Jonas and Troyzan asked to use the women's net to fish in exchange for half the catch, but were rebuffed.: Reward Challenge: One castaway at a time would use a large slingshot to fire a coconut at a 5×5 grid of targets. The first tribe to knock out 5 targets in either a horizontal, vertical, or diagonal line would win a choice of one of three rewards: a mattress, blankets and pillows; a tarp; or donuts, coffee, sugar, and creamer.; The Reward Challenge was won by Salani and they selected the tarp as their reward. Back at camp, Leif told Bill that Colton wanted to vote Bill out at the last Tribal Council. When Michael told Colton that he saw Bill and Leif having a conversation, Colton confronted Leif about what he told Bill. After Leif admitted that he told Bill about being targeted, Colton told Leif that he picked the wrong side and that his fate in the game was sealed. Leif knew that he lost the trust of his alliance and had to regain their trust.: Immunity Challenge: The tribes would divide into pairs and, cuffed together, race across interspersed teeter-totters to solve increasingly difficult puzzles, each time collecting a key. Once three keys were collected, the last castaway would use the keys to unlock three locks and raise their tribe's flag in victory.; When the Immunity Challenge treemail arrived in the form of a puzzle, Kat and Alicia argued when Alicia thought Kat was questioning her puzzle solving skills. At the challenge, Alicia and Chelsea struggled at solving the first puzzle, even with the help of looking at the men's completed puzzle, and the men had an easy win. Back at camp, Sabrina told Kim that Alicia was the weakest link and she had to go, which unsettled Kim. At Manono, Leif confided in Bill that he had been targeted by the tribe for removal prior to the Challenge. Bill tried to make peace with Colton, but Colton refused any conversation and an argument ensued. After the confrontation, Colton proposed to the other men that they give the Tribal Immunity to Salani, go to Tribal Council, and vote out Bill. Angry at Leif for the perceived betrayal, Colton and Tarzan told Leif that he was going to be voted out next and browbeat the rest of the men into giving up Tribal Immunity. Manono became the first tribe in Survivor history to voluntarily give up tribal immunity, which left Jeff awestruck. He then grilled the men on why they were there, especially since there was no reward for them. Leif appeared to throw himself at the mercy of his alliance, and Colton and Bill argued over Bill's choice in careers, Colton's prejudices, and their different lifestyles. When the vote came, Colton's control of his tribe was apparent and Bill was voted out.
356	5	"A Bunch of Idiots"	6.2/11	3.0/9	March 14, 2012	10.56	#11
When the tribes arrived for the Reward Challenge, Jeff shocked the castaways by announcing a tribe redistribution. The new tribes would be selected by the castaways smashing an egg against their bodies which would reveal their new tribe's color. After all of the eggs were smashed, the new Manono consisted of Alicia, Christina, Colton, Jonas, Leif, Monica, and Tarzan while the new Salani was Chelsea, Jay, Kat, Kim, Michael, Sabrina, and Troyzan.: Reward Challenge: Working in teams of four, the tribes would race to fill and carry a bucket of water from a water tower filling station to a container. The bucket would have several holes in it which the castaways would have to plug to prevent water from running out of the bucket. The first tribe to have enough water in their container to tip a seesaw and raise their flag would win peanut butter and jelly sandwiches, coffee, and the right to live at the current campsite. The losing tribe would have to move to a new campsite.; The new Salani then went on to win a closely fought challenge. Jeff tossed Manono a map to their new campsite and they headed out. At the new Manono camp, Colton and Alicia were disappointed at their new tribe's members. Colton promised the girls he was with them but also told Jonas that he was with the men all the way. Colton told Alicia that he wanted to vote out Christina next, which made her suspicious of his true loyalties. Alicia was fine with one of the women being voted out next as long as it was not her. Later, Colton changed his mind and wanted to target Monica. At the Salani campsite, Jay and Troyzan formed an alliance with Kim. On day 14, Kim went looking for the Hidden Immunity Idol and found it. She told Chelsea about her find and they plotted their next moves in the game.: Immunity Challenge: Three members from each tribe would race to fetch a ball in the water and shoot it into a basket. The tribe would score a point for every basket they make. The first tribe to score three points would win. Challenge from Survivor: Tocantins.; At the Immunity Challenge, the new Salani won their second challenge in a row. Back at Manono, Alicia and Colton shifted their attention to voting out Monica. They told Christina and Monica that the vote was going against Tarzan and told the others that the true vote was going against Monica. At Tribal Council, Alicia and Colton's plan came together and Christina watched in stunned disbelief as Monica was voted out.
357	6	"Thanks for the Souvenir"	6.2/10	2.8/9	March 21, 2012	10.47	#15
When Manono returned to camp, Alicia and Colton gloated at Christina over their blindside of Monica; telling Christina that she had no chance of any alliances in the game and that she was going to be voted off next ahead of any other castaway.: Reward Challenge: One castaway from each tribe would race up to the top of a stack of crates. The castaway would then bounce a coconut off of a net trampoline to hit one of five targets. The castaways would then race back to the start line where another castaway would take their turn. The first tribe to knock out all five targets would win a trip to a Survivor-style ice cream parlor.; Salani continued their winning streak at challenges by winning the Reward Challenge while Manono crumbled due to Christina's lack of effort in the challenge. During the challenge, Colton screamed at Christina and called her an idiot. While Salani was enjoying their reward, Alicia and Colton continued their ridiculing of Christina, with Colton telling Christina that she could enjoy her last two days in the game, quit, or jump in the camp fire. While Alicia, Colton, and Tarzan were off talking, Christina tried to get Jonas and Leif on her side by telling them that Alicia has an alliance with the other women. Alicia came back without Christina noticing and the two had a confrontation over Christina's play in the game. During the middle of night on day 15, Colton woke up complaining of a severe headache and pain in his right side. Christina tended to Colton, which he took as a ploy to stay in the game. Tarzan, a plastic surgeon, determined that Colton had initial signs of appendicitis, though it could also be something benign. Colton walked out of camp thinking that he was dehydrated. Christina found him curled up on the ground and called the Survivor Medical Team. Ramona, the Medical Team doctor, diagnosed possible appendicitis that required immediate evacuation for further tests. Jeff told Colton the option to give the Hidden Immunity Idol to somebody was completely his. He called the Manono tribe together to say goodbye to Colton. Before Colton left, he told his tribe to "Go get 'em" and that he was keeping the hidden immunity idol as a souvenir, which angered Alicia. The departure of Colton caused strategy shifts by Alicia and Jonas. Alicia felt that Colton screwed her over by keeping the idol. Jonas thought some of the power in the tribe had shifted to him and that it might be better to vote out Alicia instead of Christina due to Alicia's alliance with the other women. On day 17, treemail stated that both tribes would be going to Tribal Council. While Salani made some wild speculations about what was to occur during a vote at Tribal Council, at Manono, Leif was the swing vote between Alicia and Tarzan voting for Christina or Christina and Jonas voting for Alicia. At Tribal Council, Jeff told the two tribes that Colton had been medically evacuated from the game after being diagnosed with acute appendicitis and taken to a hospital for surgery. The two tribes discussed how Colton's departure affected the game. When Alicia and Tarzan told Salani that Colton kept the hidden immunity idol, the Salani tribe was suspicious that Manono might not be telling the truth. Jeff then shocked the tribes for a second time by telling them to drop their buffs as the tribes were merged. He tossed the castaways a new set of black buffs and the discussion continued over the strategy of the individual phase of the game. The yet-to-be-named merged tribe departed Tribal Council to return to their original camp site.
358	7	"The Beauty in a Merge"	5.9/10	2.9/9	March 28, 2012	9.99	#19
When the newly merged tribe returned to camp from Tribal Council, the merger feast was waiting for them. The next morning, the castaways decided upon the tribe name of Tikiano. Tarzan approached Michael about reforming the original male Manono alliance along with Alicia. Michael told Tarzan that he was in, but in reality, he was not as he wanted to stick with the post-switch Salani tribal alliance.: Reward Challenge: The castaways would be split into two teams. One at a time, four members of each team would race through an obstacle course of digging and crossing underneath a log and crawling under a wooden rack. They would then dig up a bag of puzzle pieces buried in the sand and race back through the obstacle course. Once all four bags were retrieved, the two remaining team members would use the pieces to assemble a puzzle. The first team to assemble their puzzle would win pizza, beer, and a secret note to be read after the feast.; For the Reward Challenge, the castaways were split into the orange team of Alicia, Chelsea, Christina, Jay, Sabrina, and Troyzan versus the blue team of Jonas, Kat, Kim, Leif, Michael, and Tarzan. Leif started off first for the blue team and struggled under the log, giving the orange team a huge lead. However, the lead was squandered when Sabrina was slow retrieving the fourth bag of pieces and Michael was able to catch up. The challenge came down to the puzzle assembly stage where Christina and Troyzan faced off against Jonas and Tarzan. Momentum swung back and forth between the two pairs, but Christina and Troyzan managed to pull off the win. After the winning six enjoyed their feast, they read the secret note, which said that there was another Hidden Immunity Idol hidden back at camp. The six agreed to keep the note secret between themselves. Back at camp, Michael told Jonas about Tarzan's plan to reform the original Manono alliance, which was news to Jonas. Jonas confronted Tarzan about it and the two had a vocal argument. Tarzan declared he was dropping his alliance with Jonas and he was dropping out of the tribe. Troyzan woke up early on day 19 to go searching for the new Hidden Immunity Idol and found it.: Immunity Challenge: Each castaway would have to stand on a small wooden log while balancing a ball on a wooden disk. At regular intervals, a ball would be added until the castaway would be balancing three balls. Should any of the balls fall off the disk or if they step off the log, the castaway would be out of the challenge. The final castaway to remain standing on the log without dropping any of the balls would win.; At the Immunity Challenge, Troyzan beat out Kat for the first Individual Immunity. The post-switch Salani tribe agreed to vote out Jonas for being the biggest threat among the post-switch Manono tribe. Kim told Troyzan that she was thinking of voting out Jonas. Troyzan told Jonas that his name was on the chopping block, which made Jonas start to scramble to swing the vote away from him to Kat. Jonas apologized to Tarzan, which patched up the friction between them and Tarzan resumed his alliance with Jonas. After Chelsea and Tarzan clashed over laundry, Chelsea wanted to shift her alliance's vote from Jonas to Tarzan. At Tribal Council, Jonas tried to deflect votes from himself and on to Michael by openly declaring that he was voting for Michael. Tarzan was not happy that Jonas threw Michael under the bus. Jonas then told Tarzan that they did not have the necessary votes to vote out Kat. Kat asked Tarzan what she had done to deserve the votes and Tarzan said that Jonas was lying. Tarzan stated that the tribe should vote out Jonas and then added, "If they wanted to vote me off, that's fine! But I'm voting for Jonas tonight for what he did!" The tribe then discussed the social interaction of Jonas and Tarzan within the tribe. When the vote came, the post-switch Salani alliance stuck to their first plan and Jonas became the first member of the jury.
359	8	"Just Annihilate Them"	6.1/10	2.8/9	April 4, 2012	10.36	#18
Jay and Troyzan were concerned that their choice to align with the post-switch Salani alliance was going to backfire on them should all of the women align together against the men. They agreed that one of the women had to be voted out next.: Reward Challenge: The castaways would be split into two teams. One at time, a castaway would slide down a large water slide and then race out into the ocean to retrieve a crate. The next castaway would then slide down the slide and would help all team members who had gone down the slide to retrieve another crate. The process would repeat until five crates were retrieved. The teams would then use the crates to assemble a puzzle. The first team to assemble their puzzle would win a trip to an oasis with a barbecue and 7 Up.; At the Reward Challenge, the tribe divided into teams by schoolyard pick of Alicia, Chelsea, Kat, Jay, and Troyzan versus Christina, Kim, Leif, Michael, and Sabrina. Tarzan was not picked and sat out the challenge. The challenge was closely fought with the team of Christina, Kim, Leif, Michael, and Sabrina taking the win. During their reward trip, Kim and Sabrina agreed that their alliance with Chelsea could control the game with the other three women by voting out Michael. They would deceive Troyzan into thinking Michael was voting him out. Back at camp, the losing team also talked about whom to vote out next. Troyzan suggested Christina and Jay agreed, while Kat suggested Michael. This made Jay and Troyzan more nervous about an all women alliance. The next day, Tarzan annoyed several members of the tribe when they thought he took a piece of their shelter to use as firewood. Tarzan took Chelsea aside to ask her if she was biased against him because he was a plastic surgeon and she was unhappy with her breast implants. This made Chelsea want to vote out Tarzan as soon as possible, but she knew that the better strategy was to vote out the bigger threats and she thought Tarzan was not a threat. Kim put the plan she agreed upon with Sabrina into effect by telling Troyzan that Michael said Troyzan was a threat to win the game and that he needed to be voted out. Troyzan bought the story and agreed to vote out Michael.: Immunity Challenge: The castaways would race across a ladder bridge while guiding three bags of puzzle pieces along a rope wrapped around the bridge. The first four castaways to complete the first stage would move on to the second stage where they would assemble a complex puzzle. The first castaway to complete their puzzle would win.; At the Immunity Challenge, Alicia, Jay, Kim, and Troyzan moved on to the final stage where Jay came from behind to take the win. Back at camp, Chelsea asked Jay what he thought about voting for Michael in front of Alicia and Christina, which made Jay even more suspicious of his post-switch Salani alliance was not real and that the women were going to vote out the men. Kim went to do damage control with Jay and Michael by telling them they should vote out Christina and the rest of the post-switch Manono tribe next. Jay's nervousness made Kim consider changing the plan and vote out Christina instead of Michael to keep the post-switch Salani alliance together. At Tribal Council, the alliance of Chelsea, Kat, Kim, and Sabrina stuck to their plan to take out Michael and he was voted out.
360	9	"Go Out with a Bang"	6.0/10	2.7/8	April 11, 2012	9.91	#17
Reward Challenge: The tribe would be split into two teams to play a variation of ladder toss with five rungs. Each castaway would throw the bola once to attempt to score for their team. The team with the highest score would win a boat trip to a secluded island to enjoy a local barbecue.; Day 23's treemail announced the second do-it-yourself Reward Challenge. The tribe drew rocks to divide into teams of Alicia, Jay, Kat, Tarzan, and Troyzan versus Chelsea, Christina, Kim, Leif, and Sabrina. The team of Alicia, Jay, Kat, Tarzan, and Troyzan won the challenge after Kat and Tarzan scored a combined six points while Christina was the only one to score a single point for her team. While on their reward trip, Jay told Kat that the post-switch Salani alliance had to stick together and vote out Alicia, Christina, Leif, and Tarzan, but Jay was still suspicious that the women were going to eliminate the men first. The next day, Alicia, Chelsea, Kat, Kim, and Sabrina agreed that Jay or Troyzan would be voted out next. However, Chelsea was apprehensive about the plan as she had told both Jay and Troyzan that they could trust her. This upset Alicia, Kat, and Sabrina as they thought Chelsea should not have made any agreement with the men. Meanwhile, Jay and Troyzan agreed that one of the women of the post-switch Manono had to be voted out. Jay then talked to Chelsea, Kat, Kim, and Sabrina and got them to agree to vote out Alicia. However, the four girls lied to Jay and Kim told Alicia that she was safe. Jay trusted the four girls' promise, but Troyzan was suspicious.: Immunity Challenge: The castaways would stand on a log, one arm above their head with their wrist tethered to a bucket of water on top of a platform. The castaway who could stand there the longest without tipping the bucket would win. During the challenge, Jeff would tempt the castaways to quit with offerings of food.; At the Immunity Challenge, Tarzan dropped out of the challenge as soon as Jeff told the castaways that the challenge was on. Christina dropped out next. Sabrina dropped out when Jeff offered two cookies and a glass of milk. Kat and Kim dropped out for four cupcakes and a glass of milk. Alicia told Chelsea that she would drop out so that Chelsea could win. Before Jeff revealed the next food item, Alicia agreed to drop out without seeing the item. She ended up with a bowl of candy and chocolate. After 45 minutes, Troyzan fell out. Jay stepped off for chicken wings and beer. The challenge came down to Chelsea and Leif. Chelsea told Leif that he would be less of a threat in the game if he stepped off. Jeff offered up three hamburgers, potato chips, and a beer. After checking in with Chelsea that her promise was true, Leif stepped off, giving Chelsea the win. Leif gave Chelsea a bite of his bribe. Back at camp, Chelsea and Kim agreed to split the vote between Jay and Troyzan in case one of the played a Hidden Immunity Idol. Kim assured Jay and Troyzan that neither of them were being voted out. Troyzan was still suspicious about Kim and retrieved his Hidden Immunity Idol to play at Tribal Council. Troyzan told Jay that the women were playing them, but Jay still did not believe that the women were going to betray them. Troyzan also told Jay that he was going to play his Hidden Immunity Idol and asked him to vote for Kim. Jay told Kim about Troyzan's plan and told her that they should vote out Alicia. At Tribal Council, the women's alliance stuck to their plan of splitting the vote between Jay and Troyzan. Troyzan played his Hidden Immunity Idol, negating the two votes against him, but a blindsided Jay received five votes and became the third member of the jury.
361	10	"I'm No Dummy"	6.0/9	2.8/9	April 18, 2012	9.96	#14
After the betrayal at Tribal Council, Troyzan decided that he was going to play the rest of the game with the attitude of him versus everybody else.: Reward Challenge: Instead of a Reward Challenge, a Survivor Auction was held. Items won include food and drinks, letters from home, a shower, and an advantage at the next immunity challenge.; Day 26's treemail had envelopes with $500 in cash for a Survivor Auction. Money and items won could not be shared. Alicia spent $500 for a letter from home (from her dad), which she read out loud to the tribe. With the price fixed at $500, Jeff offered the other castaways their letters. Tarzan bought his and decided to keep the letter private. Troyzan was tempted to buy his letter from home, but felt that he had to play the rest of the game on his own. While Christina had enough money to buy her letter, she did not. The others could not afford their letters as they had bought an item earlier in the auction. Egged on by the others, Christina got into a bidding war with Troyzan over the advantage at the next Immunity Challenge. After Troyzan won the item, Sabrina commented that he would still be voted off next. Troyzan told the tribe that he felt that the bidding was another sign that the game had turned into the rest of the tribe versus him. Kat broke the tension by telling Jeff that she still had money left and urging him to continue the auction. The last item for bid, a mystery item, was bought by Kat for $160. The note stated that she had bought the cake for the entire tribe and that they had 60 seconds to eat it. When Troyzan got back to camp, he went off hunting for a new Hidden Immunity Idol without any regard for the others noticing. Not finding an Idol, Troyzan decided to feign that he found it.: Immunity Challenge: The castaways would replay previous challenges. In the first stage, the castaways would race to untie knotted ropes to free a ring. The first four to finish would move on to the second stage where they would race up to the top of a stack of crates and bounce coconuts off of a net trampoline to hit three targets. The first two to hit all of their targets would move on to the final stage where they would use a slingshot to fire a coconut at a 3×3 grid of targets. The first castaway to knock out 3 targets in either a horizontal, vertical, or diagonal line would win.; At the Immunity Challenge, Troyzan revealed that the advantage he had won at the Survivor Auction won him a first-round bye in the challenge, allowing him to jump immediately to the second stage. He was joined by Tarzan, Kim, and Christina in the second round. Troyzan and Tarzan moved on to the final stage. The final stage was a close match between the men, with Troyzan taking the win. The women were upset at Troyzan for his posturing and trash talk after the win. Back at camp, Chelsea and Kim discussed their plans at Tribal Council now that they could not vote out Troyzan. They decided that they could not vote out one of the women as that would cause too much chaos and either Leif or Tarzan was going to go next. Troyzan told Alicia, Christina, Leif, and Tarzan that they were on the outside of the strong alliance of Chelsea, Kat, Kim, and Sabrina and this was their opportunity to vote out Kim to take control of the game. At Tribal Council, Troyzan continued his confrontation with Chelsea and Sabrina over his new attitude in the game. Troyzan repeated his pitch that the weaker five should join together to vote out the other four. When the voting came, only Leif joined in voting against Kim. The women, along with Tarzan, stuck to the plan of eliminating one of the men, sending Leif to the jury.
362	11	"Never Say Die"	5.9/10	2.7/8	April 25, 2012	9.81	#14
When the tribe got back to camp, Tarzan decided to align himself to the women so that they would vote out Troyzan first.: Reward Challenge: Each castaway would fill out a questionnaire about their opinions on the others. Then, they must predict the most common answer to each question. Each castaway with a correct prediction would be allowed to cut a section of rope holding up a doll of the castaway they want eliminated. Three cuts of the rope would send the doll into a fire where it would burn, thus eliminating that player from the challenge. Last person left with their doll not burned wins a helicopter trip to an island and a picnic.; At the Reward Challenge, Troyzan went out first, followed by Tarzan, Chelsea, Kat, Sabrina, and Christina. The challenge came down to Alicia and Kim, with Kim taking the win. Jeff then asked Kim to pick one person to join her and she picked Alicia. Jeff then told her that she had one more person to take and she chose Chelsea, which upset Kat, as Kat and Kim had promised to choose each other. Troyzan used Kim's choices to tell Christina, Kat, and Sabrina that it shows exactly where they stood within the women's alliance. While the three were on their reward, they decided that they had to do some damage control when they returned. Meanwhile, back at camp, Troyzan focused on getting Kat to realize that she should feel slighted for not being taken on the reward. Sabrina tried to calm Kat down and get information on how loyal Christina would be to the women's alliance. When the three women got back from the reward, Kim tried to patch things up with Kat.: Immunity Challenge: Playing in rounds and facing off in pairs, the castaways would slide across a slippery surface to retrieve a rope ring. They would then toss the ring onto a pole. The first castaway to toss their ring onto the pole would move on to the next round. In the second round, there would be two rings to retrieve and toss onto the pole. In the final round, there would be three rings to retrieve and toss onto the pole. This challenge is a spin-off from Survivor: Fiji.; In the first round of the Immunity Challenge, Chelsea defeated Alicia, Kat defeated Sabrina, Tarzan defeated Troyzan, which brought out cheers from the women, and Kim defeated Christina. In the second round, Chelsea defeated Kat and Kim defeated Tarzan. In the final round, Kim defeated Chelsea. Back at camp, just in case Troyzan had an Immunity Idol, Kim and Sabrina came up with a plan to split the vote between Troyzan and Christina. Kat was unhappy nobody asked her opinion on what to do and did not want to be seen as a follower or weak player. Sabrina told Christina that, while votes were going to be cast against her, that she was not going to be voted out. Christina told Troyzan about the split vote, which gave Troyzan an opening to get the vote to go against Christina. At Tribal Council, the possible divisions amongst the women's alliance was discussed. When the vote came, the core women's alliance stuck to their split vote plan and Troyzan was not able to get any additional votes to go against Christina. Therefore, Troyzan became the fifth member of the jury.
363	12	"It's Gonna Be Chaos"	5.7/10	2.6/8	May 2, 2012	9.43	#21
Reward Challenge: The castaways and their loved ones would be tethered together and attached to one end of a thick rope. The thick rope has other ropes woven around it and several poles. The castaways and loved ones would have to untangle the ropes to allow them to progress along the thick rope. The first castaway and loved one to reach the end of the thick rope would win the castaway and their loved one would go on a picnic.; Day 31's treemail was a Sprint HTC Evo 3D containing videos from the castaways' loved ones: Sabrina's brother Tony, Alicia's sister Leticia, Chelsea's dad Ken, Christina's dad Sung, Kim's sister Beth, Kat's cousin Robby, and Tarzan's wife Terri. When the castaways arrived at the Reward Challenge site, Jeff brought out their loved ones for a reunion. Jeff then went over the challenge rules. Kat and Robby just barely beat out Kim and Beth in the challenge. Jeff told Kat to pick one other pair to join them on the picnic and she selected Kim and Beth. Kat was then told to pick another pair and she picked Alicia and Leticia. Kat explained that she picked Kim and Alicia because she wanted to spend time together as friends. Chelsea, Kim, and Sabrina thought it was a mistake that Kat did not pick Christina and Tarzan on the picnic. While on the reward, Kim considered bringing Alicia and Kat to the final three. Alicia and Kat wanted to vote out Sabrina ahead of Christina, but Kim was unsure if she could vote against Sabrina. Back at camp, Sabrina was very upset at Kat's choices and brought up the idea of voting out Kat. Chelsea agreed with Sabrina and asked Tarzan about what he thought of voting out Kat. Two days later, Chelsea and Kim agreed to vote out Sabrina next instead of Kat.: Immunity Challenge: The castaways would stand on a log on the edge of a platform over the water with their arms behind them hanging onto a handle. The handle would be tied to a rope. At regular intervals, Jeff would turn a crank that would uncoil more rope which would lower the castaways closer to the water. The last castaway that hangs onto the handle without falling into the water or stepping off the log would win.; At the Immunity Challenge, Kim beat out Kat to win Individual Immunity for the second time in a row. After Kat's strong showing in the challenge, Alicia changed her mind about voting out Sabrina first and wanted to vote out Kat. Alicia approached Kim about it, but Kim wanted to vote out Sabrina first. Chelsea and Kim went off together to discuss their options of voting out Kat or Sabrina. At Tribal Council, Kat's choices at the Reward Challenge and the performances of the castaways at the Immunity Challenge were discussed. When the vote came, Chelsea and Kim decided to vote against Kat and she was voted out unanimously.
364	13	"It's Human Nature"	6.1/10	2.8/9	May 9, 2012	9.97	#22
When the tribe returned to camp, Tarzan tried to secure himself a spot in the final four by talking to Kim about voting out Chelsea and Sabrina next. He offered himself as the final jury member and told Kim that he could persuade the rest of the jury to vote for her. Kim agreed that taking Alicia and Christina to the final three was her best option, but was not sure she could vote out Chelsea. When Alicia joined the conversation, the two told her the same plan. However, when Kim walked away, Tarzan told Alicia that he would persuade the jury to vote for her over Kim. The next day, Chelsea thought Alicia, Christina, and Tarzan were in an alliance to the final three. She tried to convince Christina that Tarzan could not go to the final three as all of the men of the jury would vote for Tarzan. Christina told Alicia, Kim, and Tarzan about her conversation with Chelsea. Kim was concerned that Chelsea had blown her double dealing with the trio of Alicia, Christina, and Tarzan and the pair of Chelsea and Sabrina. Kim told Chelsea about what Christina had done, which upset Chelsea. Kim told Chelsea that the game was now Chelsea, Kim, and Sabrina versus Alicia, Christina, and Tarzan.: Reward Challenge: The castaways would race to collect three disks from three poles. The castaway would have to circle around the pole at each station to unscrew the disk from the top of the pole. Once all three disks were retrieved, they would use the disks to solve a combination lock that would release a flag. The first castaway to raise their flag would win an overnight trip on a sailboat with a three course meal.; The Reward Challenge was won by Chelsea. Chelsea went back on her promise to Christina and instead took Sabrina and Kim on the reward. While the three were on reward, Alicia and Christina were upset about Chelsea's choices and wanted to vote out Chelsea if she did not win Individual Immunity. Tarzan told Alicia and Christina that Kim and Chelsea were deceiving them and that they should take him to the final three. Alicia wanted to hear what Kim would say after she returned from the reward. The next day, Alicia and Kim talked and they discovered that Tarzan had told them both the same story about swaying the jury votes in their favor. They agreed that they couldn't let Tarzan play both sides or they would look like morons. The two told Christina about Tarzan's plotting.: Immunity Challenge: With one arm tied behind their backs, the castaways would work to solve a three section puzzle in the shape of a fish skeleton. The castaways would link together fish hooks to retrieve a bag of puzzle pieces that would complete one of the three sections. After one section is complete, the castaways would retrieve another bag of puzzle pieces until all three sections were complete. The first castaway to solve the entire puzzle would win.; Alicia beat out Kim in a closely fought Immunity Challenge. Back at camp, Alicia was unsure if she should go with Tarzan and vote out Chelsea or to believe Kim and vote out Tarzan. At Tribal Council, Tarzan's game play and suitability to take to the final three were discussed. When the vote came, the women decided to vote out Tarzan and he was sent to the jury.
365	14	"Perception Is Not Always Reality"	5.8/10	2.9/8	May 13, 2012	10.34	#20
Immunity Challenge: The castaways would begin by untying a series of knots that would open a gate. The castaways would then cross a balance beam maze. At the end of the maze, the castaways would bounce along a cargo net to retrieve five puzzle piece bags. Once all five bags were retrieved, the castaways would use the pieces to solve a puzzle that would give them three clues to the numbers of a combination lock. The castaways would then climb a tower to solve the combination lock which would raise a flag. The first castaway to raise their flag would win.; Kim and Sabrina talked about considering voting out Chelsea and taking Christina to the final three. At the Immunity Challenge, Kim came from behind during the puzzle stage to win her third Individual Immunity. Chelsea told Kim that she wanted to vote out Alicia and take Sabrina to the final three. Kim was not sure if she would vote out Chelsea or Alicia. Kim told Sabrina that she wanted to vote out Alicia. Kim then told Alicia and Christina that she was going to vote out Chelsea. At Tribal Council, the women made their pitch to Kim to align with her side. When the vote came, Kim's true allegiance came out, and she voted Alicia to the jury by a vote of 3–2. When the women returned to camp, Kim apologized to Christina for lying to her for so long. Day 38's treemail instructed the final four to take the traditional journey honoring the castaways voted out before heading to the final Immunity Challenge.: Immunity Challenge: The castaways would use a long pole to maneuver a wooden bowl around a metal rod structure. They would then balance the bowl on the top of the structure. The structure is mounted on a spring, so the structure would sway if the castaway touches the structure while maneuvering the bowl, possibly toppling the bowls from the top of the structure. The first castaway to stack ten bowls on top would win.; Kim beat out Christina for the final Individual Immunity. Back at camp, Christina accepted her fate to being voted out and did not try to convince Kim take her to the final three. Kim was still unsure if she should take Christina or Sabrina to the final three. At Tribal Council, Jeff tried to get Christina to make a pitch to stay in the game, but she refused to make much of an effort. Her fate was sealed and she became the last member of the jury. Chelsea, Kim, and Sabrina enjoyed the traditional day 39 breakfast. At the final Tribal Council, the jury made their statements to the three and questioned the three about their game play. Chelsea was lambasted as being anti-social and was seen as one of Kim's pawns, Sabrina's game was questioned about her quiet gameplay and her weak performances in immunity challenges, while Kim was criticized for making too many direct blindsides and betraying several people in the game.
366	15	"Reunion"	4.6/8	2.3/6	May 13, 2012	7.72	TBA
Nearly a year later, the votes from the jurors were read live; Kim was named Sole Survivor, having received votes from all the jurors aside from Leif and Troyzan, who voted for Sabrina. This gave Sabrina second place, and Chelsea placed third with no votes. The castaways reunited to discuss the season with host, Jeff Probst.

== Voting history ==
	Original tribes				Switched tribes		Merged tribe								
Episode	1	2	3	4	5	6	7	8	9	10	11	12	13	14	
Day	3	5	8	11	14	16	20	22	25	27	30	33	36	37	38
Tribe	Salani	Salani	Manono	Manono	Manono	Manono	Tikiano	Tikiano	Tikiano	Tikiano	Tikiano	Tikiano	Tikiano	Tikiano	Tikiano
Eliminated	Kourtney	Nina	Matt	Bill	Monica	Colton	Jonas	Michael	Jay	Leif	Troyzan	Kat	Tarzan	Alicia	Christina
Votes	Evacuated (Note: No vote; Kourtney was medically evacuated from the game.)	6–1–1	7–1–1	7–1	5–2	Evacuated (Note: No vote; Colton was medically evacuated from the game.)	10–2	7–2–2	5–2–1–0 (Note: Troyzan played a hidden Immunity Idol; therefore two votes against him did not count.)	4–3–2	4–3–1	6–1	5–1	3–2	3–1
Voter	Vote														
Kim		Nina					Jonas	Michael	Jay	Tarzan	Troyzan	Kat	Tarzan	Alicia	Christina
Sabrina		Nina					Jonas	Michael	Jay	Leif	Christina	Kat	Tarzan	Alicia	Christina
Chelsea		Nina					Jonas	Michael	~~Troyzan~~	Leif	Troyzan	Kat	Tarzan	Alicia	Christina
Christina		Nina			Tarzan		Jonas	Tarzan	Jay	Tarzan	Chelsea	Kat	Tarzan	Chelsea	Sabrina
Alicia		Nina			Monica		Jonas	Tarzan	Jay	Tarzan	Troyzan	Kat	Tarzan	Chelsea	
Tarzan			Matt	Bill	Monica		Jonas	Christina	Jay	Leif	Christina	Kat	Chelsea		
Kat		Nina					Jonas	Michael	~~Troyzan~~	Leif	Troyzan	Sabrina			
Troyzan			Matt	Bill			Jonas	Michael	Kim	Kim	Christina				
Leif			Matt	Bill	Monica		Michael	Michael	Alicia	Kim					
Jay			Matt	Bill			Jonas	Michael	Alicia						
Michael			Bill	Bill			Jonas	Christina							
Jonas			Matt	Bill	Monica		Michael								
Colton			Matt	Bill	Monica	Evacuated									
Monica		Christina			Tarzan										
Bill			Matt	Leif											
Matt			Colton												
Nina		Kat													
Kourtney	Evacuated														

Jury vote
Episode	15		
Day	39		
Finalist	Kim	Sabrina	Chelsea
Votes	7–2–0		
Juror	Vote		
Christina	Yes		
Alicia	Yes		
Tarzan	Yes		
Kat	Yes		
Troyzan		Yes	
Leif		Yes	
Jay	Yes		
Michael	Yes		
Jonas	Yes		

== Production ==
=== Filming ===
This is the fourth season that initially divided the tribes by gender, following Survivor: The Amazon, Survivor: Vanuatu and Survivor: Panama. The season's title is in reference to the two tribes initially sharing a campsite; while this had been done in Survivor: Thailand and Survivor: Palau, this is the first time the concept was both employed at the beginning of the game and continued beyond the first tribal challenge. As a result of the shared campsite, hidden immunity idols were designated for specific tribes; if a castaway found the idol designated for the opposing tribe, he or she was required to give it to a member of the other tribe before the next Tribal Council. All of these twists ended when the tribes were reorganized on Day 12.

== Reception ==
Despite the absence of Redemption Island and having an all-new cast, Survivor: One World was the fourth consecutive season of the series to be met with a generally negative reception. Although the gameplay of Kim Spradlin received praise, much criticism was aimed towards the gender tribe division, as well as the season's predictability. Survivor columnist Dalton Ross of Entertainment Weekly gave this season a negative review. He called the cast, "thoroughly uninspiring" and went on to say that, "Colton was more a horrible human being than a classic villain, and the rest of the players were mostly either completely forgettable or people you wish you could forget." Ross ultimately ranked One World as the fifth-worst season of the series, only better than Thailand, Fiji, Nicaragua, and Island of the Idols. Jeff Probst felt this season was a "bit of a letdown," adding that "We just didn't have the standout moments and characters needed for a great season." From 2012 to 2014, Survivor fan site "Survivor Oz" consistently ranked One World in the bottom five in its annual polls ranking all seasons of the series; in 2012, it was the fifth-worst ahead of Fiji, Thailand, Nicaragua, and Redemption Island, and in 2013 and 2014, it was the fourth-worst ahead of Fiji, South Pacific, and Redemption Island. Similarly, fellow fan site "The Purple Rock Podcast" ranked One World as the ninth-worst season in 2020. In 2014, Joe Reid of The Wire ranked One World as the seventh-worst season, similarly criticizing Colton and saying that his "petulance, racism, snobbery, whining, and cruelty makes him very possibly the worst person to ever be on the show." In 2015, a poll by Rob Has a Podcast ranked this season as the second-worst season of all time, only ahead of Redemption Island, with Rob Cesternino ranking this season 27th. This was updated in 2021 during Cesternino's podcast, Survivor All-Time Top 40 Rankings, ranking 37th. In 2020, Inside Survivor ranked this season 37th out of 40 saying that the One World twist fell flat and the "vast majority [of the players] is either wholly forgettable or actively unlikeable." In 2024, Nick Caruso of TVLine ranked this season 43rd out of 47.
