= Sarah Lacina =

American television personality (born 1984)

- Born: July 9, 1984 (age 42); Muscatine, Iowa, U.S.
- Education: Wartburg College (BA)
- Occupations: Police officer; MMA fighter; Television personality
- Employer: Cedar Rapids Police Department
- Television: Survivor: Cagayan; Survivor: Game Changers (winner); Survivor: Winners at War; The Challenge: USA (winner); The Challenge: World Championship
- Spouse: Wyatt Wardenburg
- Children: 1

Sarah Lacina (born July 9, 1984) is an American reality television show contestant, police officer, and professional mixed martial arts fighter. She is best known for competing on the reality show Survivor three times, winning Survivor: Game Changers in 2017. She also won The Challenge: USA in 2022.

== Early life ==
Lacina was born in Muscatine, Iowa in 1984. She grew up in Muscatine with her parents Lorrie and Ronald. Her mother worked in law enforcement.

Lacina attended Muscatine High School where she was a four-sport athlete. In 1997, she qualified for the regional USA Track and Field Junior Olympics.

She then attended Wartburg College in Waverly, Iowa, earning a Bachelor's degree in social work in 2006. While in college, she was a member of the track and cross country teams.

== Career ==
After college, Lacina worked as a resource officer at Kennedy High School in Cedar Rapids. She joined the Cedar Rapids Police Department as a homicide investigator.

At the Cedar Rapids Police Department, she met officer Tom Grubb, a MMA fighter who inspired her to take up mixed martial arts. In January 2009, Lacina began training to become a boxer, with Joe Ruiz of the Apache Boxing Club at the Valhalla Club in Cedar Rapids. She competed in her first boxing match on August 29, 2009. In 2010, she competed in her first professional MMA fight, a first-round victory by submission.

== Reality television ==
Lacina's job with the Cedar Rapids Police Department has allowed her to take leave to participate in numerous competitive television shows.

=== Survivor: Cagayan ===
In 2013, Lacina was one of eighteen castaways to compete on Survivor: Cagayan, the 28th season of Survivor. The theme of the season was "Brawn vs. Brains vs. Beauty." As a police officer, she started on the Brawn tribe called Aparri. She recognized that her teammate Tony Vlachos was also a police officer, and the two formed an alliance called Cops-R-Us. Aparri won the first four immunity challenges, but after the tribe swap, she was the only original Aparri member to remain on that tribe. Ultimately, Lacina finished in eleventh place and was the first member of the jury.

=== Survivor Game Changers ===
Lacina returned for the 34th season, Survivor: Game Changers in 2017. She only went to Tribal Council twice before the merge due to being part of very strong tribes that did well in immunity challenges. After reaching the merge, she stayed in the middle, navigating between alliances, in order to have more options. For most of the post-merge phase, she positioned herself as the swing vote many times, turned on several of her allies (including Debbie Wanner), had a hand in several blindsides, managed to find the vote-stealer advantage and successfully play it, and inherited the Legacy Advantage upon Sierra Dawn Thomas's elimination. At the Final Six, Lacina successfully saved herself by claiming the immunity offered by the Legacy Advantage. She, Brad Culpepper, and "Troyzan" Robertson also allied, and all three of them managed to make it to the Final Tribal Council.

Despite being accused, specifically by Ozzy Lusth, of backstabbing most of the jurors and using her social connections for strategic gain, the ways that she managed to have strategic control, be the driving force, and still maintain social connections were praised by certain jurors, particularly Zeke Smith and Michaela Bradshaw. She ended up becoming the Sole Survivor, and winner of the season, over Culpepper and Robertson in a 7–3–0 vote.

=== Survivor: Winners at War ===
Lacina came back as a contestant on the show's 40th season, Survivor: Winners at War in 2019. In this season, she called out the gender bias of the television show, requesting that Jeff Probst, the show's host, call her "Lacina", as she noted that he used this to honor male players, but called female players by their first names. She came in fourth place in this season.

=== The Challenge: USA ===
In 2022, Lacina competed on the CBS series The Challenge: USA. She became the female winner of the season, taking home $254,500.

=== The Challenge: World Championship ===
For winning The Challenge: USA, Lacina qualified to participate in The Challenge: World Championship which ran on Paramount+ in 2023. She came in fourth place in the show's final because her partner, Theo Campbell, was medically disqualified.

== Personal life ==
Lacina lives in Marion, Iowa, with her husband and fellow police officer, Wyatt Wardenburg, and their son, Knox.

In October 2020, Lacina appeared in an ad for Ashley Hinson, a Republican running for the United States House of Representatives in Iowa's 1st congressional district against Democratic incumbent representative Abby Finkenauer. In the ad, Lacina said, "I don't care what side you're on, you can't trust anyone who votes with Nancy Pelosi 93 percent of the time".

== Filmography ==
=== Television ===
Year	Title	Role	Notes
2014	Survivor: Cagayan — Brains vs. Brawn vs. Beauty	Contestant	8th eliminated; 11th place
2017	Survivor: Game Changers — Mamanuca Islands	Contestant	Sole Survivor; 1st place
2020	Survivor: Winners at War	Contestant	19th eliminated; 4th place
2022	The Challenge: USA	Contestant	Winner; 1st place
2023	The Challenge: World Championship	Contestant	4th place

Preceded by Adam Klein	Winner of Survivor; Survivor: Game Changers	Succeeded by Ben Driebergen
Preceded by ‒	Winner of The Challenge: USA; The Challenge: USA season 1	Succeeded by Chris Underwood; Desi Williams
