= Survivor: David vs. Goliath =

- Season 37
- Region 1 DVD cover
- Presented by: Jeff Probst
- No. of days: 39
- No. of castaways: 20
- Winner: Nick Wilson
- Runner-up: Mike White
- Location: Mamanuca Islands, Fiji
- No. of episodes: 14

Release
- Original network: CBS
- Original release: September 26 – December 19, 2018

Additional information
- Filming dates: March 29 – May 6, 2018

Season chronology
- ← Previous; Ghost Island Next → Edge of Extinction

Survivor: David vs. Goliath is the 37th season of the American competitive reality television series Survivor. Hosted by Jeff Probst and broadcast by CBS between September 26 and December 19, 2018, the season featured 20 contestants originally divided into two tribes of ten inspired by the biblical figures David and Goliath: the "David" tribe composed of underdogs who have had to overcome adversity throughout their lives, and the "Goliath" tribe consisting of ten overachievers who have leveraged their advantages to succeed in their respective fields. The tribes were switched on day 10 into three tribes of five selected by a random draw; "Jabeni", "Tiva", and "Vuku". On day 19, they merged into a single tribe, "Kalokalo", for the remainder of the game. Filming took place in the Mamanuca Islands of Fiji between March 29 and May 6, 2018, making it the sixth season of Survivor to film in Fiji. Due to Severe Tropical Cyclone Keni striking during the season's filming, the castaways and crew were evacuated for two days, pausing the game.

After 39 days, Nick Wilson was named the Sole Survivor, defeating fellow finalists Mike White and Angelina Keeley in a 7–3–0 jury vote and winning a prize of US$1,000,000. The season garnered widespread acclaim from critics and audiences alike due to the cast, theme and gameplay. It is generally regarded as one of the show's greatest seasons.

== Overview ==
Survivor is a reality television show based on the Swedish show Expedition Robinson, created by Mark Burnett and Charlie Parsons. The series follows a number of participants isolated in a remote location, where they must provide food, fire, and shelter. One by one, a participant is removed from the series by majority vote, with challenges held to give a reward (ranging from living- and food-related prizes to a car) and immunity from being voted out of the series. The last remaining player receives a prize of $1,000,000.

== Production ==
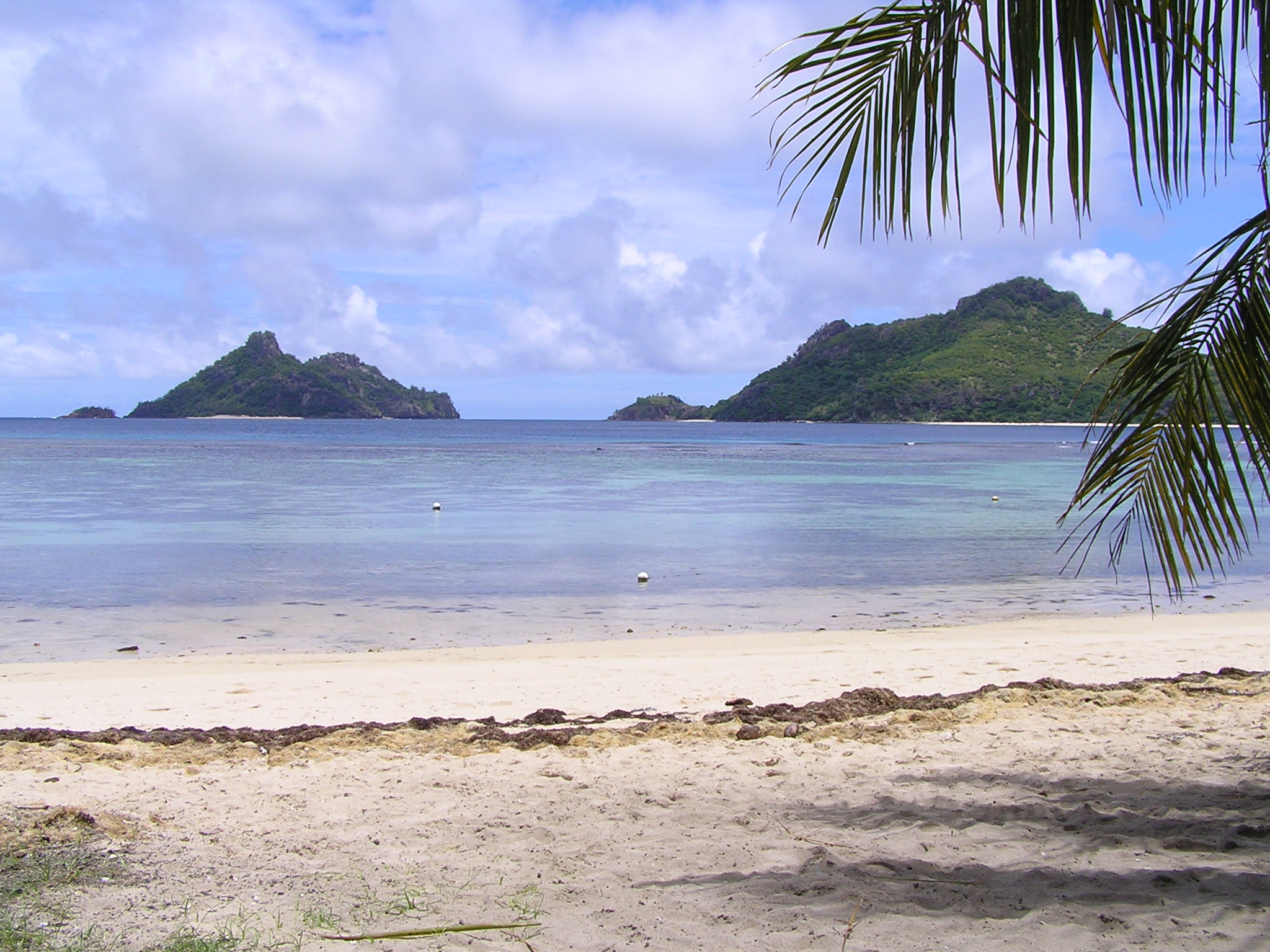
The season filmed in the Mamanuca Islands of Fiji.

Probst explained that a predetermined theme is undecided during casting, with ideas emerging during the casting process, being finalized a month before filming begins. The idea for the David vs. Goliath theme was inspired by the opposing personalities of eventual contestants John Hennigan and Christian Hubicki. The tribes were inspired by the biblical figures David and Goliath, with the David tribe being composed of underdogs and the Goliath tribe being overachievers. Probst said that there were risks to incorporating the theme due to the physically unbalanced starting tribes, but hoped it would reveal the Davids' strengths and the Goliaths' weaknesses.

Survivor: David vs. Goliath was filmed between March 29 and May 6, 2018 in the Mamanuca Islands of Fiji. It was the sixth season of Survivor to be filmed in Fiji. When the David tribe were returning to their beach from a challenge, their boat was hit by rough waters from Tropical Cyclone Josie, resulting in one contestant sustaining a back injury and being medically evacuated. The cast were later struck by Severe Tropical Cyclone Keni and production decided to evacuate them from their beaches into temporary housing where tribes were kept separated and not allowed to speak. The cast were evacuated for two days, the second such occurrence on Survivor following Survivor: Millennials vs. Gen X, which had also been filmed in Fiji two years earlier. The season premiered on September 26, 2018, with an extended 90-minute episode. Its live finale aired on December 19, 2018.

The season introduced a new advantage to the game, the idol nullifier. Initially hidden on Exile Island, once found the player could use it to negate another player's hidden immunity idol if they correctly guess whom the idol will be played on beforehand.

== Contestants ==
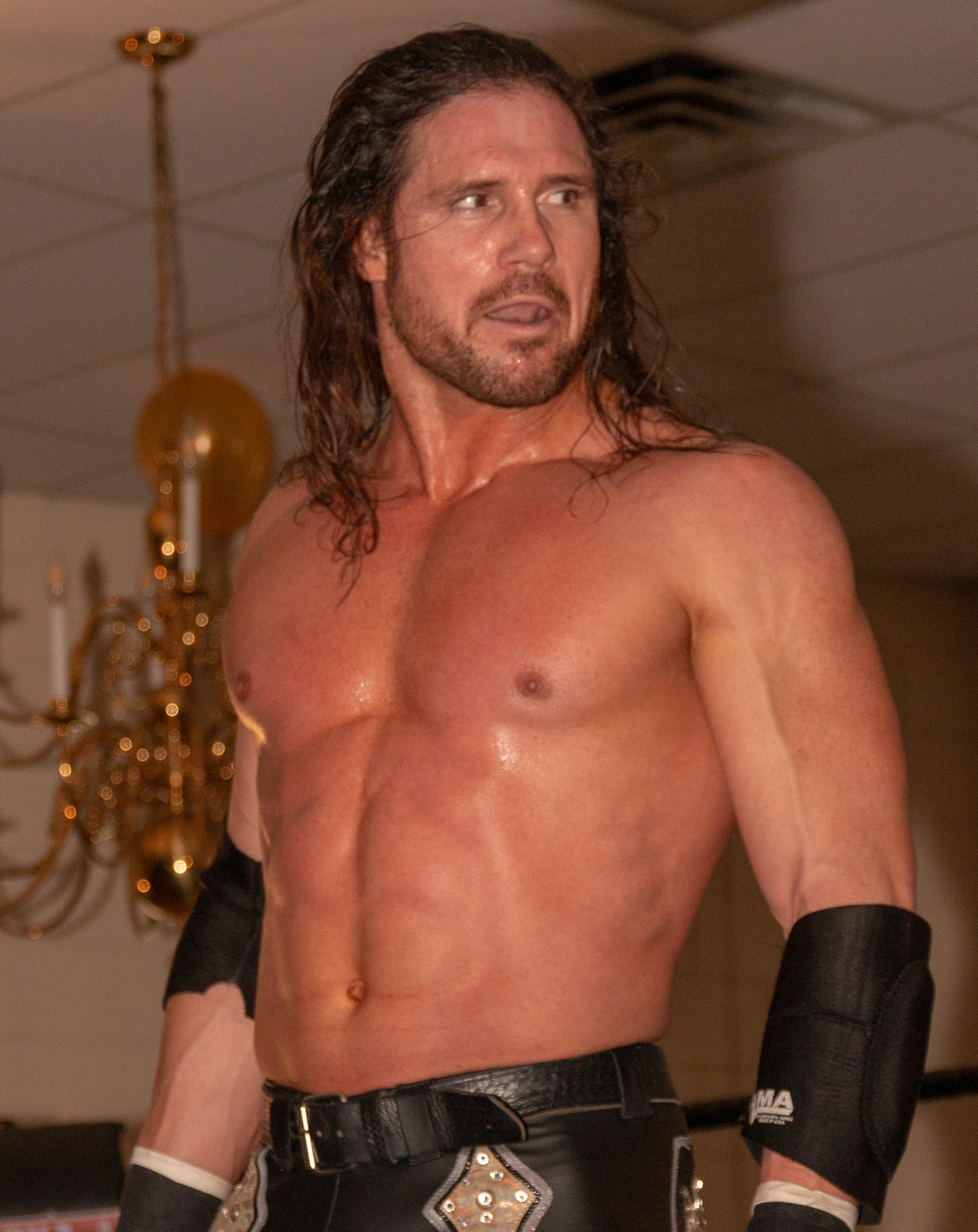
John Hennigan

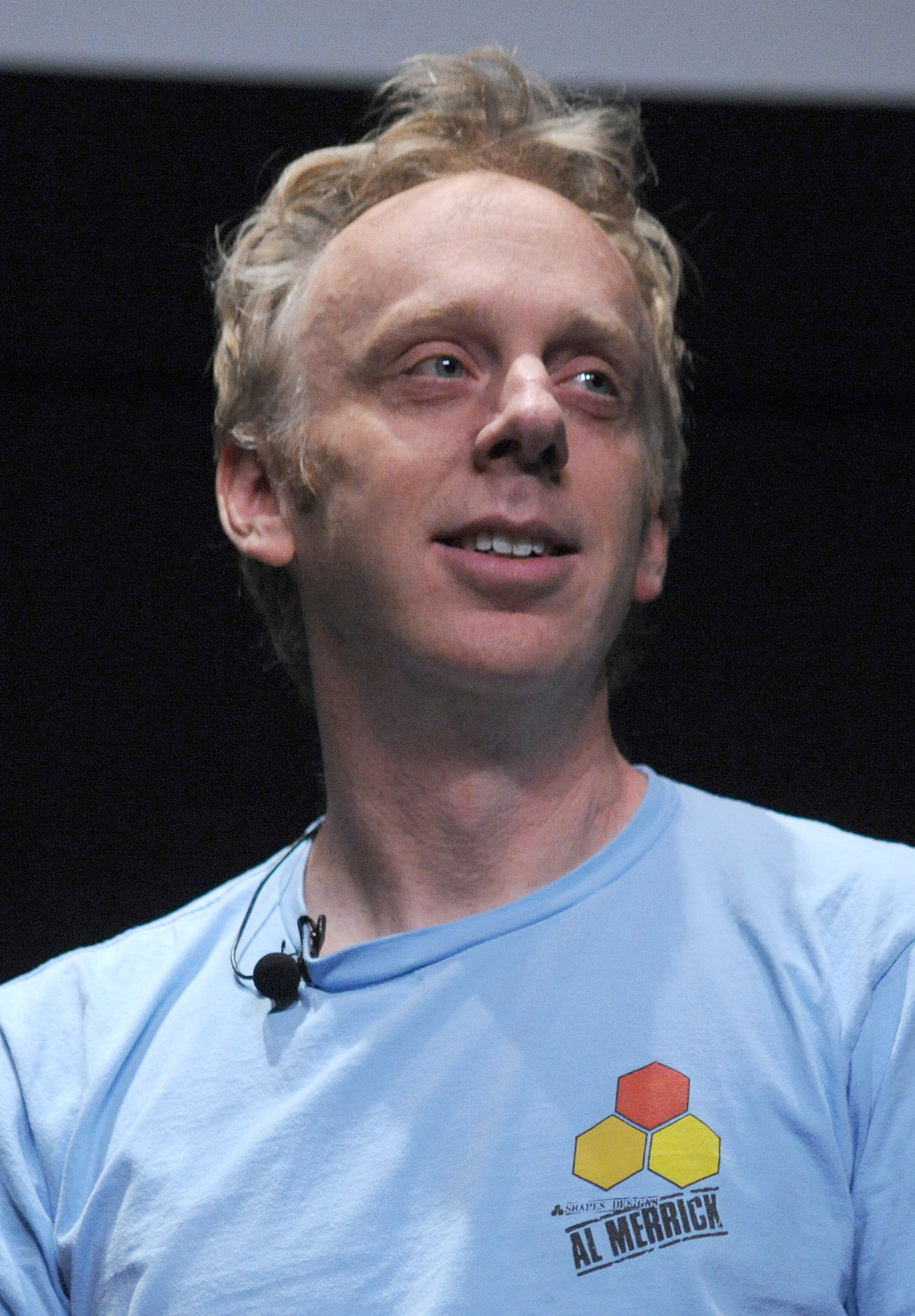
Mike White

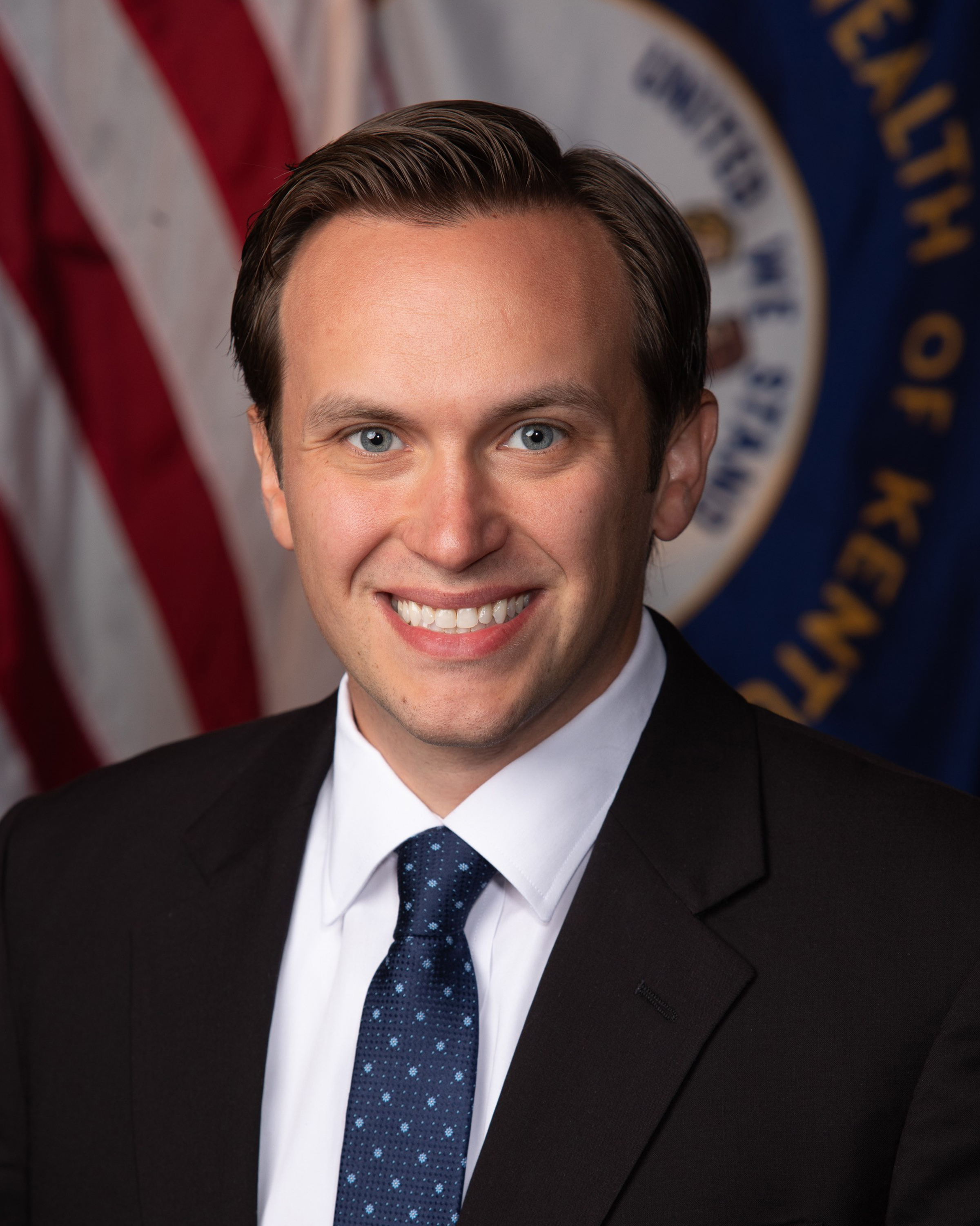
Nick Wilson

The cast is composed of 20 players divided into two tribes. On day 10 during the tribe switch, "David" and "Goliath" were renamed "Vuku" and "Jabeni". The switch introduced a third tribe, "Tiva". The merged tribe, "Kalokalo", was named after the Fijian word for "star", which was suggested by contestant Elizabeth Olson. Notable cast includes filmmaker and two-time The Amazing Race contestant Mike White, and professional wrestler and Tough Enough III co-winner John Hennigan.

List of Survivor: David vs. Goliath contestants
Contestant	Age	From	Tribe			Finish	
Contestant	Age	From	Original	Switched	Merged	Placement	Day
Pat Cusack	41	Watervliet, New York	David			Medically evacuated	Day 3
Jessica Peet	19	Lakeland, Florida	David			1st voted out	Day 6
Jeremy Crawford	40	New York City, New York	Goliath			2nd voted out	Day 9
Bi Nguyen	28	Houston, Texas	David			Quit (Injury)	Day 10
Natalia Azoqa	26	Irvine, California	Goliath	Vuku		3rd voted out	Day 11
Natalie Cole	57	Los Angeles, California	Goliath	Jabeni		4th voted out	Day 15
Lyrsa Torres	36	Boston, Massachusetts	David	Jabeni		5th voted out	Day 17
Elizabeth Olson	31	Longview, Texas	David	Vuku	Kalokalo	6th voted out 1st jury member	Day 20
John Hennigan	38	Los Angeles, California	Goliath	Tiva	Kalokalo	7th voted out 2nd jury member	Day 22
Dan Rengering	28	Gainesville, Florida	Goliath	Tiva	Kalokalo	8th voted out 3rd jury member	Day 25
Alec Merlino	24	San Clemente, California	Goliath	Vuku	Kalokalo	9th voted out 4th jury member	Day 28
Carl Boudreaux	41	Houston, Texas	David	Vuku	Kalokalo	10th voted out 5th jury member	Day 30
Gabby Pascuzzi	25	Denver, Colorado	David	Tiva	Kalokalo	11th voted out 6th jury member	Day 32
Christian Hubicki	32	Tallahassee, Florida	David	Tiva	Kalokalo	12th voted out 7th jury member	Day 35
Davie Rickenbacker	30	Atlanta, Georgia	David	Vuku	Kalokalo	13th voted out 8th jury member	Day 36
Alison Raybould	28	Chapel Hill, North Carolina	Goliath	Tiva	Kalokalo	14th voted out 9th jury member	Day 37
Kara Kay	30	San Diego, California	Goliath	Vuku	Kalokalo	Eliminated; 10th jury member	Day 38
Angelina Keeley	28	San Clemente, California	Goliath	Jabeni	Kalokalo	2nd runner-up	Day 39
Mike White	47	Los Angeles, California	Goliath	Jabeni	Kalokalo	Runner-up	Day 39
Nick Wilson	27	Williamsburg, Kentucky	David	Jabeni	Kalokalo	Sole Survivor	Day 39

=== Future appearances ===
Nick Wilson returned to compete on Survivor: Winners at War. Christian Hubicki, Angelina Keeley, and Mike White returned to compete on Survivor 50: In the Hands of the Fans.

== Season summary ==
The 20 new castaways were divided into two tribes based on adversity: David (underdogs) and Goliath (overachievers). Due to a series of injuries, the David tribe were down in numbers when the tribes were shuffled; on all three new tribes, the Goliaths held the majority. However, the Davids were able to take advantage of the dissension among the Goliaths, working with them to eliminate several Goliaths.

The Goliaths entered the merge in the majority. While the Goliaths tried to decimate the David alliance, the Davids’ sharp strategizing and well-timed playing of advantages put them in the majority after blindsiding the Goliath alliance’s leaders, John and Dan. Christian and Gabby then betrayed their David alliance to eliminate Carl, which ultimately turned the other Davids against them; Mike from the Goliath alliance used the opportunity to lead the charge to eliminate the rest of the Davids, while Kara played both sides from the middle. However, Nick from the David tribe won the last three immunity challenges, making his way to the end of the game with Goliaths (and Jabeni tribemates) Mike and Angelina. The jury respected Nick's social game and ability to fight his way out of being an underdog over Mike's late-game strategic emergence and Angelina's selfish, manipulative personality, voting Nick the Sole Survivor in a 7–3–0 vote over Mike and Angelina respectively.

Challenge winners and eliminations by episodes
Episode			Challenge winner(s)		Eliminated	
No.	Title	Original air date	Reward	Immunity	Tribe	Player
1	"Appearances are Deceiving"	September 26, 2018	David		David	Pat
1	"Appearances are Deceiving"	September 26, 2018	Goliath		David	Pat
2	"The Chicken Has Flown the Coop"	October 3, 2018	Goliath		David	Jessica
3	"I Am Goliath Strong"	October 10, 2018	David		Goliath	Jeremy
4	"Time to Bring About the Charmpocalypse"	October 17, 2018		Carl (Note: Carl drew a package without a buff during the tribe swap. As a result, he was exiled and joined the tribe that lost the next Immunity Challenge: Vuku.)	David	Bi
4	"Time to Bring About the Charmpocalypse"	October 17, 2018	Tiva		Vuku	Natalia
4	"Time to Bring About the Charmpocalypse"	October 17, 2018		Jabeni	Vuku	Natalia
5	"Jackets and Eggs"	October 24, 2018	Vuku	Vuku	Jabeni	Natalie
5	"Jackets and Eggs"	October 24, 2018	Jabeni	Tiva	Jabeni	Natalie
6	"Aren’t Brochachos Just Adorable?"	October 31, 2018	Tiva	Tiva	Jabeni	Lyrsa
6	"Aren’t Brochachos Just Adorable?"	October 31, 2018	Jabeni	Vuku	Jabeni	Lyrsa
7	"There's Gonna Be Tears Shed"	November 7, 2018	None (Note: There was no reward challenge due to the merge.)	Alison	Kalokalo	Elizabeth
8	"You Get What You Give"	November 14, 2018	Alec, Alison, Christian, Gabby, John, Nick	Dan	Kalokalo	John
9	"Breadth-First Search"	November 21, 2018	Alec, Dan, Davie, Kara, Mike	Alec	Kalokalo	Dan
10	"Tribal Lines Are Blurred"	November 28, 2018	Alec, Alison, Christian, Gabby, Mike	Christian	Kalokalo	Alec
10	"Tribal Lines Are Blurred"	November 28, 2018	Carl, Davie, Kara, Mike	Davie	Kalokalo	Carl
11	"So Smart They're Dumb"	December 5, 2018	Angelina, Nick [Davie, Mike]	Kara	Kalokalo	Gabby
12	"Are You Feeling Lucky?"	December 12, 2018	Davie [Kara, Nick]	Mike	Kalokalo	Christian
13	"With Great Power Comes Great Responsibility"	December 19, 2018	Nick [Angelina, Mike]	Nick	Kalokalo	Davie
13	"With Great Power Comes Great Responsibility"	December 19, 2018	None	Nick	Kalokalo	Alison
13	"With Great Power Comes Great Responsibility"	December 19, 2018	None	Nick (Note: For winning the final Immunity Challenge, Nick had to assign additional immunity to another player, with the remaining two competing in a fire-making challenge to determine the third finalist; he gave additional immunity to Angelina.) [Angelina]	Kalokalo	Kara
14	"Reunion Special"	December 19, 2018				

== Episodes ==
No. overall	No. in season	Title	Rating/share (18–49)	Weekly rank	Original release date	U.S. viewers (millions)
541	1	"Appearances are Deceiving"	1.7/7	N/A	September 26, 2018	7.83
Host Jeff Probst introduced the season's "David vs. Goliath" theme before asking the Goliath tribe to choose who they perceived to be the weakest man and woman from the David tribe and their own two strongest. The tribe chose Christian and Lyrsa as the weakest Davids, and John and Alison as their strongest. These pairs then faced off in a reward challenge for their tribes to win a shelter-making kit. After allowing the David tribe to assign three different tasks for each pair to complete, the David tribe emerged victorious. At the David camp, Pat and Nick emerged as early potential targets as they irritated people by being bossy when building the shelter, and forming alliances over camp work, respectively. Notable early bonds formed: Christian and Gabby, Elizabeth and Lyrsa, and Carl and Davie. On the Goliath tribe, Dan was attracted to Kara, while Natalie caused friction by giving orders without helping. Dan, Kara, and Natalia found a hidden immunity idol together, which Dan kept. Both tribes endured intense rain. In the combined Reward/Immunity Challenge, tribes navigated obstacles, dug under a log, used ladders, pole vaulted, and solved a number puzzle. Goliath narrowly beat David, earning immunity and flint. On the return trip to the David camp, Pat suffered a serious back injury due to rough waters. After a medical evaluation, he was evacuated from the game. Jeff canceled Tribal Council and gave David a flint. A postscript revealed Pat fully recovered after filming concluded.
542	2	"The Chicken Has Flown the Coop"	1.5/7	N/A	October 3, 2018	7.27
After a cyclone hit overnight, Jeff Probst provided both tribes with a firemaking kit and tarp. At the David camp, Christian and Nick solidified an alliance, and Davie found a hidden immunity idol. Carl targeted Lyrsa to keep the tribe strong, but Elizabeth warned Lyrsa, prompting her to target Carl instead. On the Goliath tribe, Dan and Kara's budding showmance raised suspicions amongst their tribemates. Jeremy found Dan's idol hidden in his coat and told Mike about it. John tipped Natalie off that she was the tribe's main target in an attempt to align with her. Jeremy then tried to convince Natalie to change her ways, but it only deepened it desire to vote her out. In the Reward/Immunity Challenge, players had to retrieve a key using a ladder, unlock a boat, paddle out for puzzle bags, and then balance a table while solving a block puzzle. Goliath edged out David, winning immunity and a fishing kit. Back at the David camp, Bi and Jessica told Gabby that Lyrsa was the target, but Gabby grew paranoid about the lack of further information. Elizabeth proposed blindsiding Jessica due to her strong social ties to Carl, Bi, and Davie, winning over Gabby and Lyrsa. With Christian and Nick in the middle, they ultimately sided against Jessica and voted her out in a blindside.
543	3	"I Am Goliath Strong"	1.6/7	19	October 10, 2018	7.65
At the David camp, Bi blamed Gabby for Jessica's blindside, allowing Nick to deflect attention from himself and strengthen his position. Meanwhile, Christian and Gabby continued to deepen their alliance. Over at Goliath, Jeremy's growing paranoia led him to call a tribal meeting to stop side conversations, further straining his already tense relationship with Natalie. His erratic behavior made Mike and others question his stability within the tribe. In the Reward/Immunity Challenge, one player from each tribe untangled a rope, followed by three teammates working through a larger tangle. Then, two members used ropes to lasso a platform so the final two could complete a four-piece pyramid puzzle. David secured their first immunity win, along with comfort items. However, Bi sprained her MCL during the challenge; although cleared by medical to continue, her injury raised concerns. Back at Goliath, most castaways were prepared to vote out Natalie due to her abrasive demeanor. However, Angelina pushed hard for Jeremy's elimination, arguing he was the more dangerous long-term threat. Her argument swayed the tribe, and at Tribal Council, Jeremy was unanimously voted out, making him the first Goliath member to leave the game.
544	4	"Time to Bring About the Charmpocalypse"	1.4/6	22	October 17, 2018	7.21
On Day 10, Bi withdrew from the game due to her MCL injury, fearing long-term damage as an athlete. Immediately after, a tribe swap occurred. The original David and Goliath tribes were shuffled into three new tribes: Vuku (Alec, Davie, Elizabeth, Kara, Natalia), Jabeni (Angelina, Lyrsa, Mike, Natalie, Nick), and Tiva (Alison, Christian, Dan, Gabby, John), with the Goliaths holding a 3–2 majority on all three tribes. Carl drew the odd package and was sent to Exile Island to join the tribe which lost the upcoming immunity challenge. There, he found an idol nullifier—a twist allowing him to block an idol if correctly played. At Vuku, Davie tried recruiting Alec while Elizabeth bonded with Kara, which annoyed Natalia. At Jabeni, Natalie's bossiness persisted, and Nick and Mike formed an alliance. On Tiva, Christian integrated well with Dan and John, while Gabby felt isolated. In the Reward/Immunity Challenge, tribes navigated blindfolded teammates through obstacles and a maze to complete a table maze. Tiva finished first, winning immunity and a pastry/coffee reward, while Jabeni came second, earning immunity. Back at Vuku, Davie exposed Elizabeth targeting Natalia to save himself, which intensified Natalia's paranoia. At Tribal Council, Alec flipped on Natalia, annoyed by her paranoia, joining Davie and Elizabeth to blindside her. Carl then joined Vuku.
545	5	"Jackets and Eggs"	1.5/6	23	October 24, 2018	7.37
Following Natalia's blindside, Kara felt alienated and uncertain about her place in the game. A powerful cyclone forced production to evacuate the castaways, pausing the game. When they returned, all three camps were destroyed. In the Reward Challenge, pairs used poles to knock down sandbags and then launched them into baskets with a slingshot. Vuku placed first, earning chickens, and Jabeni came second, winning a dozen eggs. Tensions arose at Jabeni when Natalie and Lyrsa argued over how to cook the eggs. At Vuku, Kara threw Alec under the bus to the former Davids, causing Elizabeth to mistrust Kara. On Tiva, Dan, John, and Christian solidified an alliance called the "Brochachos". Dan later found a clue to a hidden immunity idol stashed at the immunity challenge, which involved raising a ladder, using a rope to close a bridge, sliding down a fireman's pole, and finishing with a vertical snake maze. Vuku and Tiva won immunity, and Dan successfully retrieved the hidden idol undetected. At Jabeni, the Goliaths planned to vote out Lyrsa, but when Angelina and Natalie asked Nick or Lyrsa for a jacket in exchange for safety, Nick took offense. He and Lyrsa approached Mike, convincing him to flip. At Tribal Council, Mike cast the deciding vote, sending Natalie home.
546	6	"Aren't Brochachos Just Adorable?"	1.3/6	24	October 31, 2018	7.06
The next day, Angelina admitted her vote against Lyrsa was a ploy to get Natalie's jacket, which backfired and turned the tribe against her. At Tiva, Christian unsuccessfully tried to catch fish. In the Reward Challenge, one player was strapped to a coconut-filled bag while teammates carried it through a beach obstacle course. The strapped player retrieved rings and later tossed them onto pegs. Tiva won first place, earning cooking utensils, spices, and kebabs. Jabeni finished in second, winning two kebabs. At Tiva, Gabby opened up to Alison about feeling on the outs, sparking a bond. Over at Vuku, Elizabeth's back pain worsened due to the bamboo shelter. Her efforts to resolve the situation clashed with Carl and Davie, creating tension. In the Immunity Challenge, tribes used a giant saucer to transport water and release puzzle pieces. Tiva and Vuku easily secured immunity, while Jabeni lagged far behind. Back at camp, Angelina targeted Lyrsa after she showed reluctance to work with her. Lyrsa tried flipping Mike, while Angelina worked on Nick. Ultimately, Mike and Nick stuck with Angelina, and Lyrsa was voted out, giving the Goliaths a clear majority heading into the merge.
547	7	"There's Gonna Be Tears Shed"	1.6/7	15	November 7, 2018	7.69
On day 18, the tribes merged on Tiva beach. Carl told Angelina that Alec had flipped on Natalia. Dan and Kara were reunited, and many Goliaths wanted to stick to original tribal lines. Angelina also pushed for Christian's elimination, seeing him as the Davids' leader. Alec formed a secret cross-tribe alliance, dubbed the "Strike Force," consisting of himself, Alison, and Mike from Goliath, and Christian, Gabby, and Nick from David. Meanwhile, Elizabeth grew irritated with Dan and Kara's late-night whispering and floated the idea of blindsiding Dan to Alec, who immediately told Dan, turning him against her. In the Immunity Challenge, castaways had to keep a pendulum swinging while balancing on a beam. Alison won immunity. With Elizabeth vulnerable, Dan pushed the Goliaths to revert their target back to her. Angelina continued to push for Christian, but her tribemates dismissed her idea. Frustrated, Angelina told Elizabeth she was being targeted, which backfired when Elizabeth exposed it to Gabby. At Tribal Council, Angelina was put on the spot for transparently trying to manage the future jury. Despite the tension, the majority stuck together, and Elizabeth was unanimously voted out, becoming the first member of the jury.
548	8	"You Get What You Give"	1.4/6	25	November 14, 2018	7.20
After Elizabeth's elimination, Angelina falsely claimed that Elizabeth had approached her about the vote, but the others didn't believe her. The next day, Nick and Davie found a clue to an advantage, which Nick retrieved with Carl's help. It allowed Nick to steal another player's vote at a future Tribal Council. Carl also revealed his idol nullifier to the other Davids, though Davie kept his own idol secret. In the Reward Challenge, the tribe was split into two teams of six, each member holding a weighted sandbag. As players dropped out, others had to take on more weight. Alec, Alison, Christian, Gabby, John, and Nick won the challenge and enjoyed pizza back at camp. During the reward, Mike rallied Goliaths to target Christian, frustrating Angelina, who felt her earlier warnings were ignored due to sexism. In the Immunity Challenge, castaways balanced on small perches while holding buoys with sticks. Dan won immunity. Alec warned Nick that Christian was the target, prompting the Davids to consider using their advantages to save him. At Tribal Council, The Goliaths voted for Christian while the Davids split their votes between Angelina and John. Davie played his idol for Christian. Angelina, panicked, convinced Dan to play his idol for her. With all Goliath votes nullified, John was eliminated and sent him to the jury.
549	9	"Breadth-First Search"	1.3/6	18	November 21, 2018	7.09
Following John's blindside, Alec, Alison, and Kara strategized on the beach, which left Dan feeling excluded. After a disagreement, Kara began distancing herself from Dan. In the Reward Challenge, two teams of five competed in an obstacle course, combination lock, and snake puzzle to win burgers and beverages. Alec, Dan, Davie, Kara, and Mike won. While they enjoyed the feast, Gabby tried to turn Alison against Dan, while Mike affirmed his desire to stay loyal to the Goliaths. Back at camp, the Davids searched for a new idol at dawn, and Christian successfully found one. During the Immunity Challenge, castaways had to cross balance beams while balancing a ball on a paddle and guide the ball down a track into a hole. Alec won immunity. Kara attempted to convince the Davids to join a split vote between Angelina and Dan, hoping to shake up the Goliath majority. However, Alison stuck with the Goliaths' plan to eliminate Christian. As the Davids planned their counterattack, they considered using all three of their advantages: Nick's vote steal, Carl's idol nullifier, and Christian's idol. At Tribal Council, Nick stole Alison's vote. Alec and Kara turned on their alliance by voting for Angelina. Dan played his idol, but Carl's nullifier voided it. With Dan unprotected, the Davids' six votes sent him to the jury.
550	10	"Tribal Lines Are Blurred"	1.6/7	18	November 28, 2018	7.60
After the vote, Angelina vowed revenge on the Goliaths who voted against her. Nick and Davie woke early to search for a new idol; Nick found a clue and retrieved it that night. In the Reward Challenge, two teams of five raced across a rope bridge and tossed poles onto rungs. Alec, Alison, Christian, Gabby, and Mike won a picnic with wine and letters from home. At camp, Carl openly targeted Alec for being a challenge threat, which annoyed Gabby. Christian outlasted Alec in the Immunity Challenge after five hours. Though Christian and Gabby considered flipping on Carl, Alec was unanimously voted out at Tribal Council. Afterward, Christian comforted Alison, who was emotional over Alec's elimination. In the next Reward Challenge, two teams of four competed in a swimming and buoy retrieval course. Carl, Davie, Kara, and Mike won an afternoon cruise. At camp, Gabby began plotting Carl's elimination with Christian and Alison. That night, Carl planned to mislead Gabby about the vote, while Kara privately turned against him. With rice running low, Angelina offered Jeff an overzealous trade for more, which the tribe accepted despite not being consulted. In the Immunity Challenge, Davie narrowly beat Alison. Jeff offered rice if one castaway sat out, which Angelina did. At Tribal Council, Gabby and Christian made their move against Carl. Mike was the swing vote and sided with them, sending Carl to the jury.
551	11	"So Smart They're Dumb"	1.5/7	18	December 5, 2018	7.51
After Carl's blindside, Nick felt betrayed by Christian. The next morning, the castaways were reunited with their loved ones before the Reward Challenge, in which randomly paired castaways raced through water and dug for keys to release balls. Angelina and Nick won and chose Davie and Mike to join them for a barbecue with their loved ones. During the reward, the four discussed a Final 4 alliance, but Davie was concerned over his standing in it. Back at camp, Gabby sought to play a more independent game and conspired with Alison and Kara to blindside Christian. In the Immunity Challenge, castaways balanced on a perch while stabilizing a bucket with a pole. Kara won immunity. Christian targeted Alison, unaware that Gabby was targeting him. Gabby tried to recruit Nick and Davie, and while Nick agreed, Davie tipped Christian off. Concerned Christian might play an idol, Mike pitched a backup plan to vote out Gabby, which Nick supported after confirming Christian had an idol. At Tribal Council, Christian played his idol and negated five votes. With the split-vote plan in place, Mike and Angelina's backup votes sent Gabby to the jury.
552	12	"Are You Feeling Lucky?"	1.5/7	12	December 12, 2018	7.77
Nick planted a fake idol and staged its discovery in front of Angelina, Mike, and Christian to discourage them from looking for the real one. Davie was leery of Nick's ruse and searched for an idol himself. He also told Christian that Nick possibly had two idols and that he planned to blindside Nick. In the Reward Challenge, castaways raced through rope obstacles and hurled sandbags at a tower. Davie won and chose Nick and Kara to join him. Upset at being left behind, Angelina cooked the tribe's remaining rice out of spite. During the reward, Davie pitched a plan to Kara to target Nick and bring in Alison and Christian. Kara shared the idea with Alison, who then told Mike, who was hesitant about betraying Nick. Davie later found an idol only good for the next Tribal Council and chose not to wager his vote to extend it. In the Immunity Challenge, castaways balanced balls on a disc while standing on a log. Mike won immunity. While Nick wanted Alison gone, Mike still targeted Christian. Nick told Davie the raft idol was fake and agreed to vote Alison, but Mike revealed Davie's earlier betrayal. At Tribal Council, Davie and Nick both played idols, but Christian was blindsided and sent to the jury with three votes.
553	13	"With Great Power Comes Great Responsibility"	1.5/7	6	December 19, 2018	7.72
The morning after Christian's blindside, Angelina found a clue to a hidden immunity idol atop a rock. She dropped the clue and was unable to retrieve the idol. In a Reward/Immunity Challenge, Nick won and chose to take Angelina and Mike on the reward. There, Mike and Nick helped Angelina get her idol. Angelina later coldly informed Alison she was the next target. However, Mike swayed Angelina to blindside Davie, citing him as a jury threat. At Tribal Council, Davie was sent to the jury, leaving Nick furious with Mike and Angelina. In the next Immunity Challenge, Nick won again. Angelina devised a plan to fake an idol for Alison while playing her real one for drama. Kara pushed to vote out Mike, and Alison supported the move. However, at Tribal Council, Alison was voted out. In the final Immunity Challenge, Nick won yet again, and decided to take Angelina to the end. Mike beat Kara in fire-making, solidifying the final three. At Final Tribal Council, Angelina touted her manipulation and rice negotiation but was criticized for constantly bringing it up. Mike emphasized his social game and strategic control, which he was praised for, but was criticised for his inactivity around camp. Nick shared his emotional journey and underdog strategy and was praised for his strategic game and immunity wins.
554	14	"Reunion Special"	1.0/5	19	December 19, 2018	5.17
At the live reunion show, Nick was named Sole Survivor in a 7–3–0 jury vote over Mike and Angelina, respectively. The castaways then reunited to discuss the season with Jeff Probst.

== Voting history ==
	Original tribes				Switched tribes			Merged tribe										
Episode	1	2	3	4		5	6	7	8	9		10		11	12	13		
Day	3	6	9	10	11	15	17	20	22	25		28	30	32	35	36	37	38
Tribe	David	David	Goliath	David	Vuku	Jabeni	Jabeni	Kalokalo	Kalokalo	Kalokalo		Kalokalo	Kalokalo	Kalokalo	Kalokalo	Kalokalo	Kalokalo	Kalokalo
Eliminated	Pat	Jessica	Jeremy	Bi	Natalia	Natalie	Lyrsa	Elizabeth	John	Dan		Alec	Carl	Gabby	Christian	Davie	Alison	Kara
Votes	Evacuated (Note: No vote; Pat was medically evacuated from the game.)	5–4	9–1	Quit (Note: No vote; Bi chose to quit the game due to an injury.)	3–1–1	3–2	3–1	12–1	3–0–0 (Note: Davie and Dan both played hidden immunity idols on Christian and Angelina, respectively. Therefore, seven votes against Christian and two votes against Angelina were not counted.)	6–3–2 (Note: Dan played a hidden immunity idol on himself, but Carl played an idol nullifier on him; therefore the effects of his idol were negated and the 6 votes against him were still counted.)		9–1	5–4	2–1–0 (Note: Christian played a hidden immunity idol on himself; therefore five votes against him were not counted.)	3–2–0 (Note: Davie played a hidden immunity idol on himself; therefore two votes against him were not counted.)	4–2	4–1	None (Note: For winning the final Immunity Challenge, Nick had to assign additional immunity to another castaway, with the remaining two competing in a fire-making challenge to determine the third finalist; he gave additional immunity to Angelina, and Mike defeated Kara in the fire-making challenge.)
Voter	Vote																	Challenge
Nick		Jessica				Natalie	Lyrsa	Elizabeth	John	Dan	Dan (Note: This player used a vote stealer advantage, allowing them to steal one vote from another player and cast two ballots.)	Alec	Alison	~~Christian~~	Christian	Alison	Alison	Immune
Mike			Jeremy			Natalie	Lyrsa	Elizabeth	~~Christian~~	Christian		Alec	Carl	Gabby	~~Davie~~	Davie	Alison	Won
Angelina			Jeremy			Lyrsa	Lyrsa	Elizabeth	~~Christian~~	Christian		Alec	Alison	Gabby	Christian	Davie	Alison	Saved
Kara			Jeremy		Davie			Elizabeth	~~Christian~~	Angelina		Alec	Carl	~~Christian~~	Christian	Davie	Alison	Lost
Alison			Jeremy					Elizabeth	~~Christian~~	None (Note: This player lost their vote as another player used a vote stealer advantage.)		Alec	Carl	~~Christian~~	~~Davie~~	Davie	Mike	
Davie		Lyrsa			Natalia			Elizabeth	John	Dan		Alec	Alison	~~Christian~~	Alison	Alison		
Christian		Jessica						Elizabeth	John	Dan		Alec	Carl	Alison	Alison			
Gabby		Jessica						Elizabeth	~~Angelina~~	Dan		Alec	Carl	~~Christian~~				
Carl		Lyrsa			Exiled (Note: Carl was exiled after drawing a package containing no buff during the tribe switch. He joined Vuku after their Tribal Council.)			Elizabeth	~~Angelina~~	Dan		Alec	Alison					
Alec			Jeremy		Natalia			Elizabeth	~~Christian~~	Angelina		Carl						
Dan			Jeremy					Elizabeth	~~Christian~~	Christian								
John			Jeremy					Elizabeth	~~Christian~~									
Elizabeth		Jessica			Natalia			Angelina										
Lyrsa		Jessica				Natalie	Angelina											
Natalie			Jeremy			Lyrsa												
Natalia			Jeremy		Elizabeth													
Bi		Lyrsa		Quit														
Jeremy			Natalie															
Jessica		Lyrsa																
Pat	Evacuated																	

Jury vote
Episode	14		
Day	39		
Finalist	Nick	Mike	Angelina
Votes	7–3–0		
Juror	Vote		
Kara		Yes	
Alison		Yes	
Davie	Yes		
Christian		Yes	
Gabby	Yes		
Carl	Yes		
Alec	Yes		
Dan	Yes		
John	Yes		
Elizabeth	Yes		

== Reception ==
Survivor: David vs. Goliath received universal acclaim from both critics and fans, with many considering it one of the best seasons in the show's history due to its strategic play, unpredictability, and memorable contestants. The Tribal Councils also received praise for being entertaining and unpredictable, with the councils in the eighth and ninth episodes, during which the former Davids used game advantages to vote out former Goliaths John and Dan despite not having the numbers on their side, earning particular attention as impressive and smartly executed blindsides, and have been hailed by several media outlets as two of the best Tribal Councils in Survivor history. Angelina Keeley's performance was also well received, with her quickly becoming one of the most notable and entertaining characters in the history of the show due to her tendency to constantly overplay in an unknowingly transparent way, making all her attempted strategic moves obvious to the other players.

Nicole Clark of Vice called the season "the best thing on TV this year", and "one of the best [seasons] in recent history", praising the cast and memorable Tribal Councils. She concluded: "It's a rollicking clusterfuck to watch, one that only gets more and more convoluted as the season develops. If you're a potential Survivor fan looking for a season to start with, this is the one to pick." Joe Reid of Decider argued that David vs. Goliath was potentially the best season of the show, stating "Up until now, the closest thing to a consensus choice for Best Survivor Season Ever has been season 20: Heroes vs. Villains. That was an all-star season full of returning players, which meant it had the advantage of characters we loved and had long histories with, playing with and against their own reputations. Consider that David vs. Goliath was starting from scratch and you'll see why this season has been getting such respect." He felt that "the ready-made underdog storyline worked wonders", that the season had "more memorable, sharable (sic) moments than any season in recent memory", and that it "has been hugely satisfying to both halves of the Survivor fan brain: the half that craves clever, savvy game play and the half that craves big, memorable characters. It's harder than you think to marry the two."

Josh Wigler of The Hollywood Reporter called it "one of the most consistently exhilarating seasons in recent memory" and "one of the most exciting iterations of the CBS reality franchise", adding,"Years from now, when Survivor fans look back on the events of David vs. Goliath, a slew of memories are likely to come to mind: the season-opening medical evacuation, Natalie Napalm and 'Jacketgate,' just to name a few." In an article published two thirds into the season, Dalton Ross of Entertainment Weekly claimed that while "[not] every episode this season has been A+++", "every episode has had something. Every episode has earned its keep. Every episode has felt like it is moving the story forward. Yes, the cast is better, but the editing and the storytelling have been better as well." Ross ranked David vs. Goliath as the fifth-best season of the series, only behind Borneo and Micronesia (tied for first), Heroes vs. Villains, and Cagayan. After the ninth episode, FanSided stated, "Let's be thankful for just how great the season has gone." Lauren Piester of E! called David vs. Goliath "One of the best seasons of Survivor ever". In 2020, "Purple Rock Podcast" ranked this season 12th out of 40 due to the casting and great gameplay. Later in the year, Inside Survivor ranked this season 5th out of 40 saying "It's not just one of the best seasons of recent memory; it's also rightfully placed as one of the greatest of all time." In 2021, Rob Has a Podcast ranked David vs. Goliath 6th during the Survivor All-Time Top 40 Rankings podcast. In 2024, Nick Caruso of TVLine ranked this season 5th out of 47.

In an interview in November 2018, Jeff Probst acknowledged the cast of David vs. Goliath as "one of the best groups we've ever had." He also highly praised the Tribal Councils in episodes eight and nine, calling the first "a total shocker and a brilliant move" and the second "a historic Survivor moment" and "all we could have ever dared dream when we put the Nullifier into this season."

== Controversy ==
Before the cast for the season was announced, contestant Alec Merlino posted a picture on Instagram with fellow contestant Kara Kay captioned: "Fuck it". This violated the non-disclosure agreements contestants signed before filming, which said they could not follow each other on social media or post photos together. As a result, he was banned from the reunion and his absence was not addressed during it.
