= Survivor: Winners at War =

Season of television series

- Season 40
- Region 1 DVD cover
- Presented by: Jeff Probst
- No. of days: 39
- No. of castaways: 20
- Winner: Tony Vlachos
- Runner-up: Natalie Anderson
- Location: Mamanuca Islands, Fiji
- No. of episodes: 14

Release
- Original network: CBS
- Original release: February 12 – May 13, 2020

Additional information
- Filming dates: May 22 – June 29, 2019

Season chronology
- ← Previous; Island of the Idols Next → Survivor 41

Survivor: Winners at War is the 40th season of the American competitive reality television series Survivor. This season, filmed in May and June 2019, is the eighth consecutive season to be filmed in Fiji. Celebrating the show's twentieth anniversary milestone, the season featured twenty returning winners from past Survivor seasons competing for a US$2 million prize. It was won by Tony Vlachos by a 12–4–0 vote over Natalie Anderson and Michele Fitzgerald, becoming the second two-time winner in Survivor history. The season aired on CBS in the United States from February 12, 2020, to May 13, 2020.

== Format ==
Survivor is a reality television show based on the Swedish show Expedition Robinson, created by Mark Burnett and Charlie Parsons. The series follows a number of participants isolated in a remote location, where they must provide food, fire, and shelter. One by one, a participant is removed from the series by majority vote, with challenges held to give a reward (ranging from living- and food-related prizes to a car) and immunity from being voted out of the series. The last remaining player receives a prize of $2,000,000.

== Contestants ==
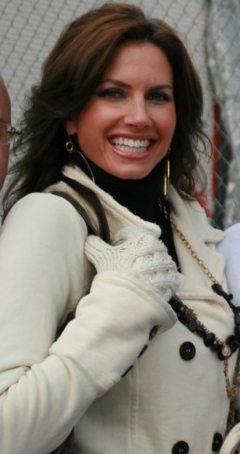
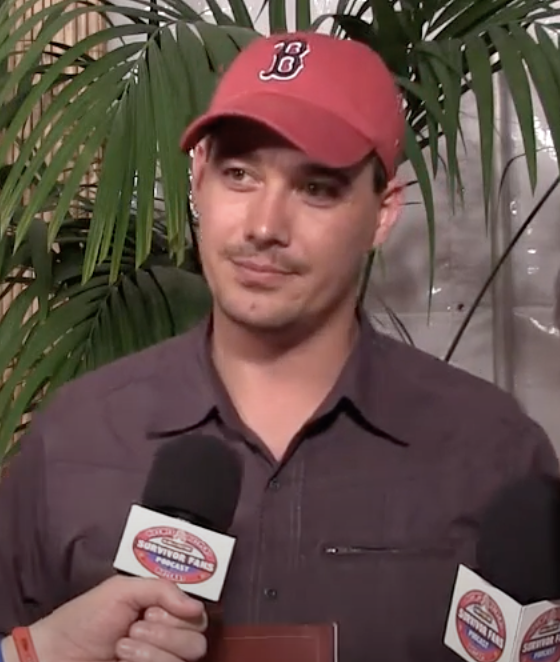
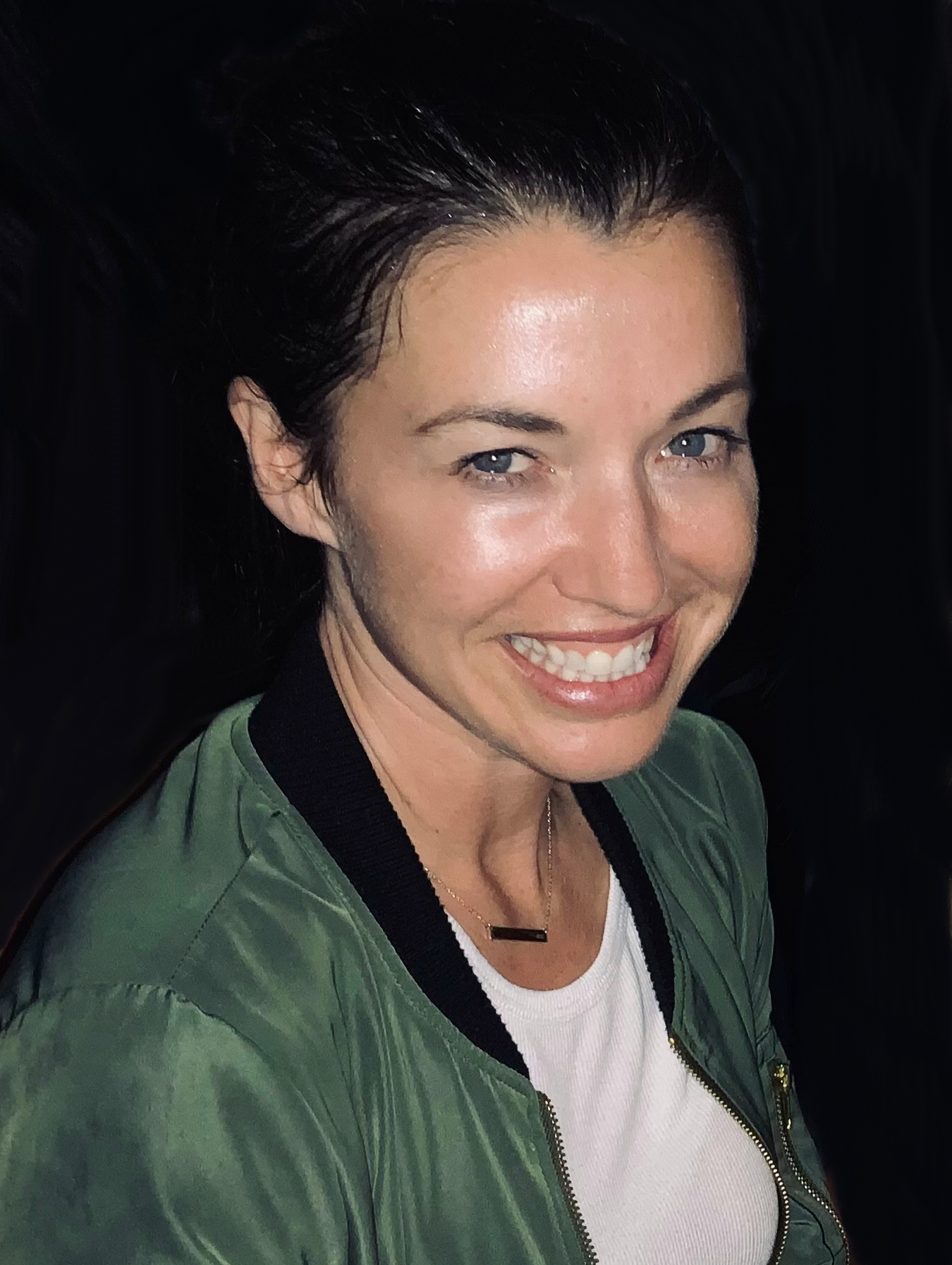
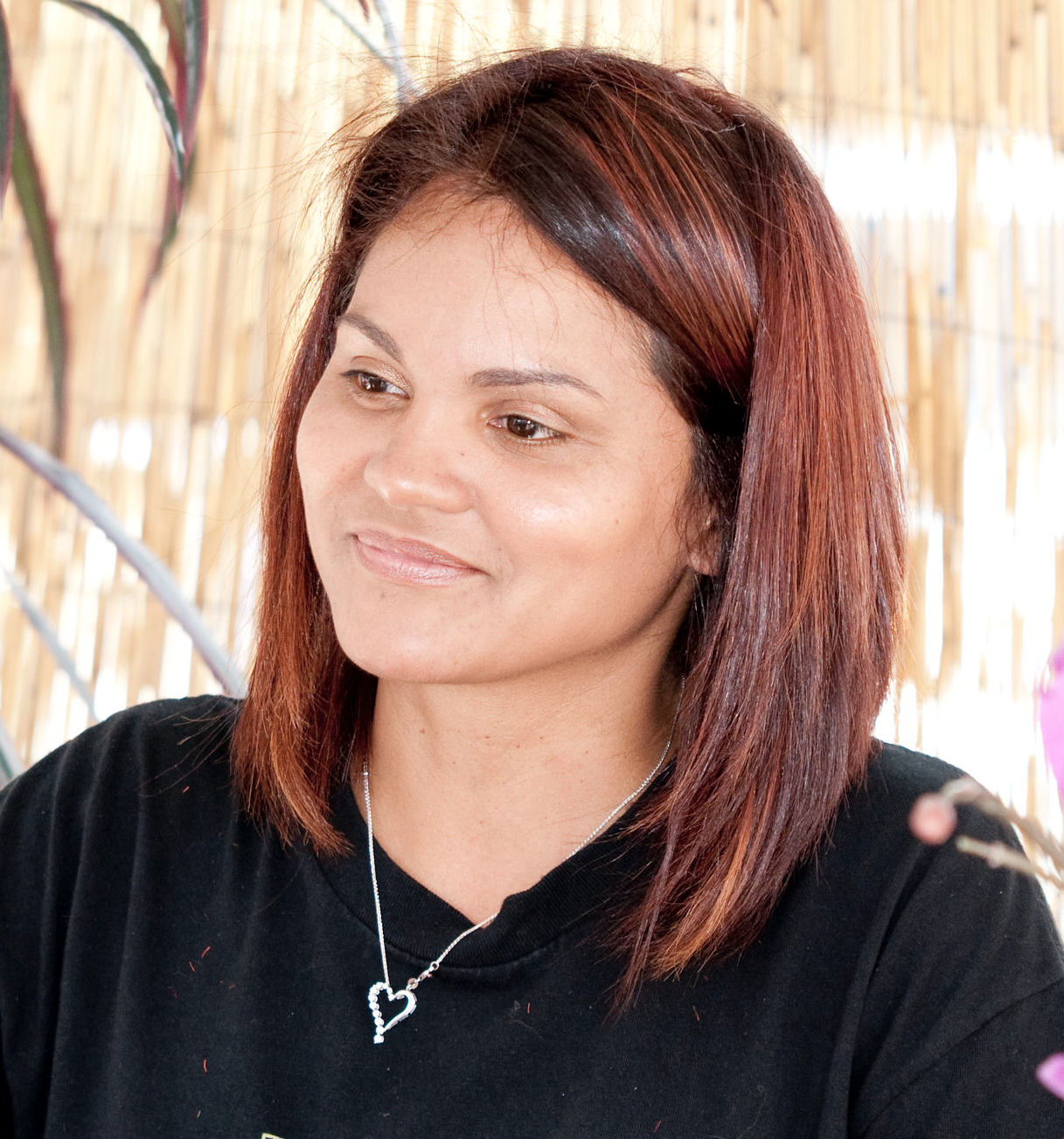
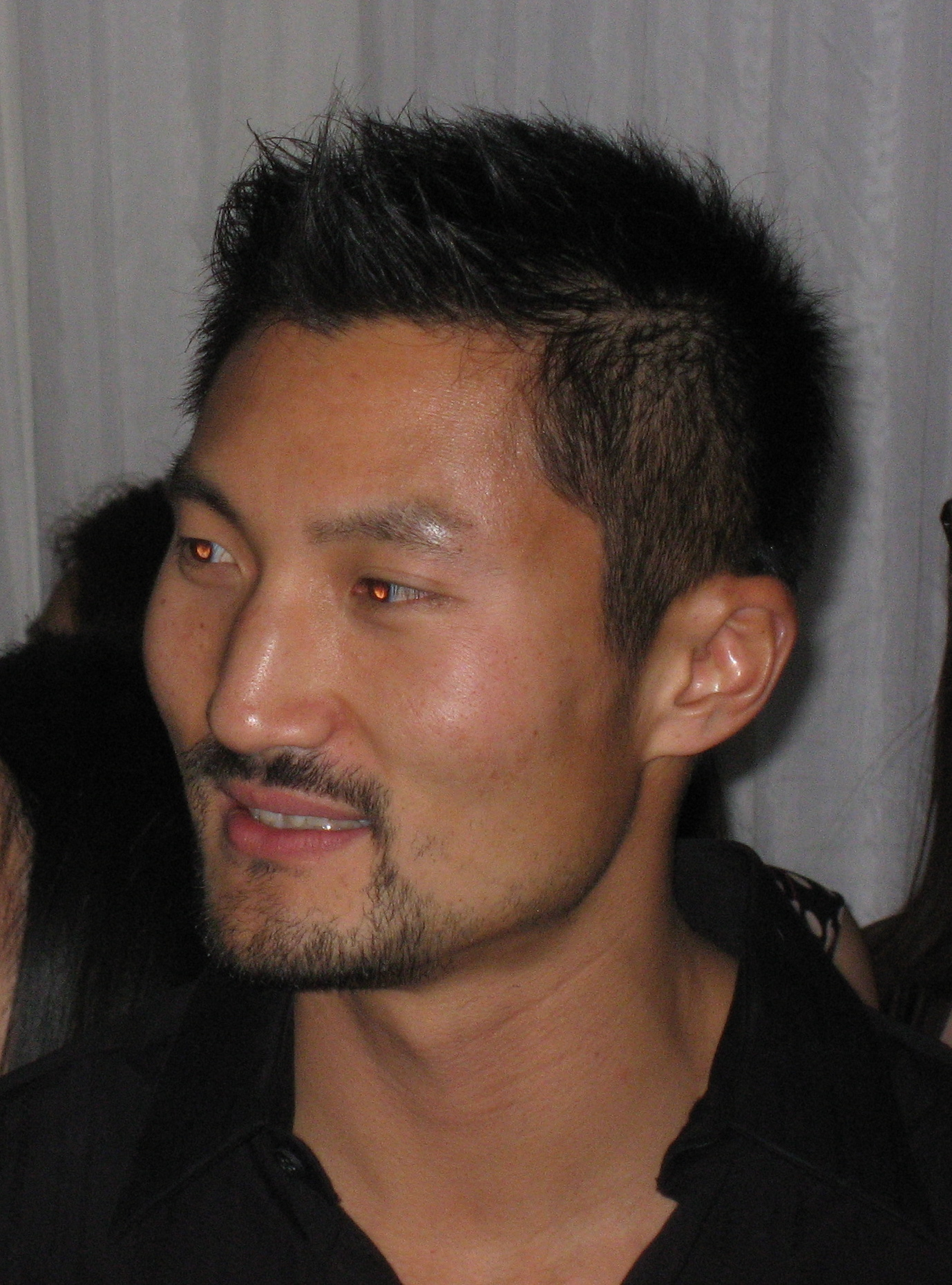
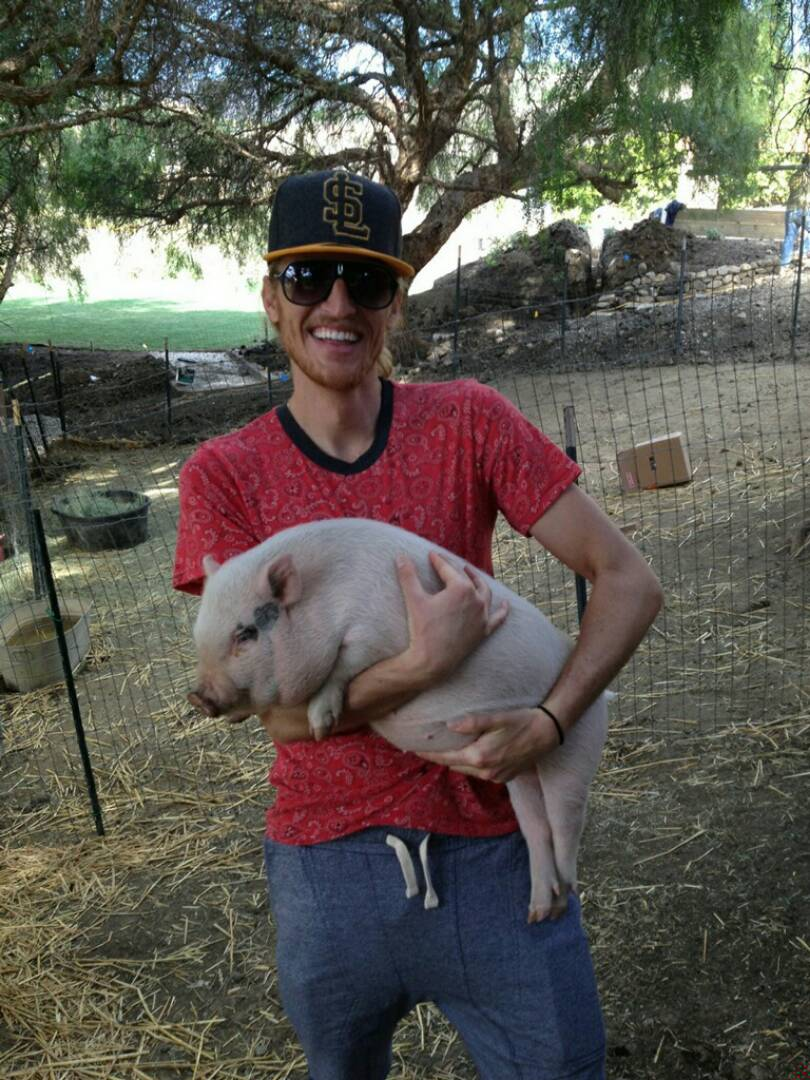
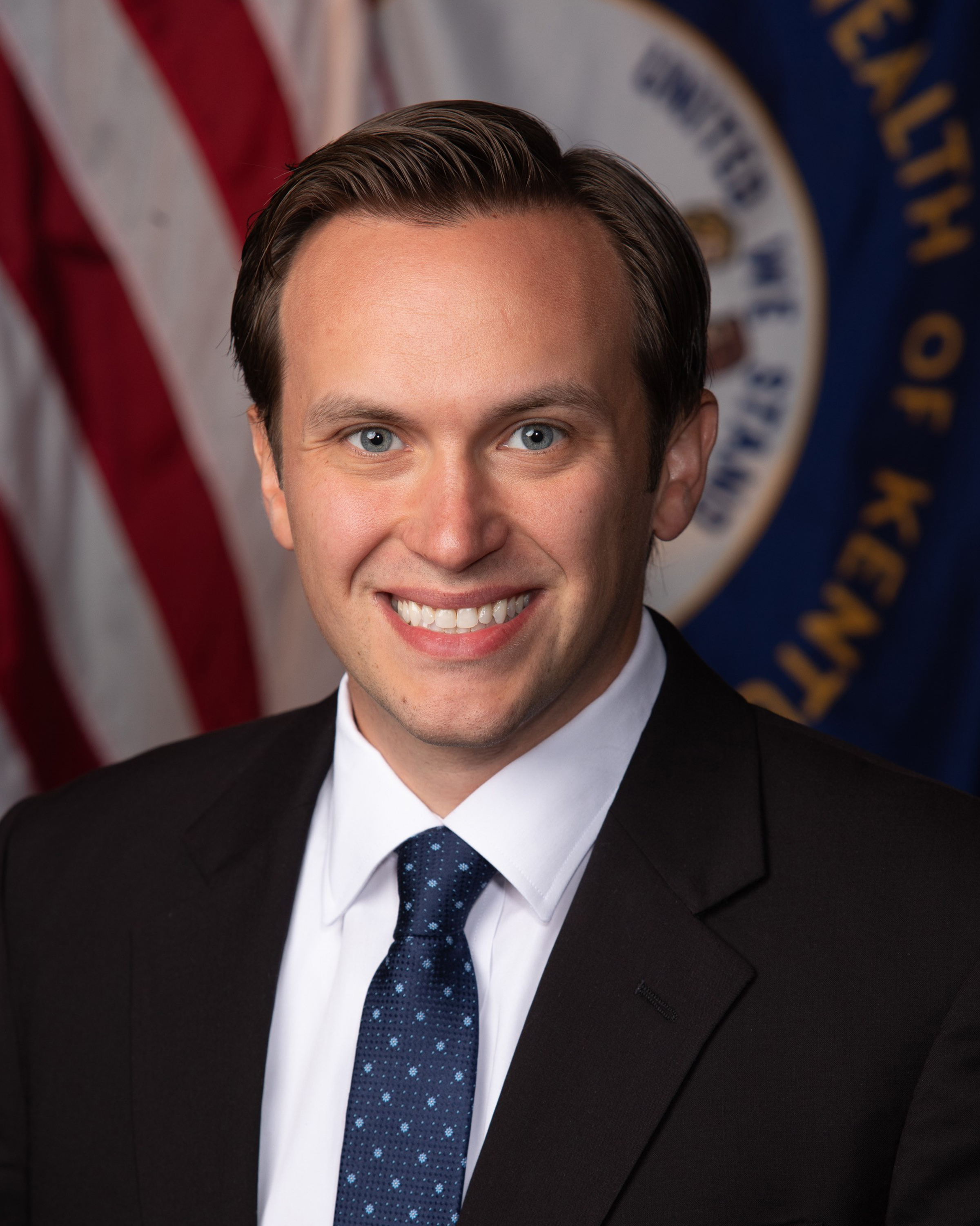
From left to right: Danni Boatwright, Rob Mariano, Parvati Shallow, Sandra Diaz-Twine, Yul Kwon, Tyson Apostol, and Nick Wilson

20 previous winners competed on this season of Survivor. Notably the cast features a married couple in Rob & Amber Mariano, with this relationship being the first familial relationship featured in ‘’Survivor’’ outside of a ‘’Blood V Water’’ edition of the show.

List of Survivor: Winners at War contestants
Contestant (Note: Winning season is underlined.)	Age	From	Tribe			Main game (Note: Elimination order is based on when the contestant was voted out at Tribal Council.)		Edge of Extinction	
Contestant	Age	From	Original	Switched	Merged	Finish	Day	Finish	Day
Natalie Anderson (Returned to game)			Sele			1st voted out Left the jury (Note: For lasting on the Edge of Extinction through to the merge, Natalie, Amber, Danni, Ethan, Rob, Parvati, and Yul joined the jury on Day 19; Natalie left the jury when she returned to the game on Day 35.)	Day 2	2nd returnee	Day 35
Amber Mariano The Australian Outback & All-Stars	40	Pensacola, Florida	Dakal			2nd voted out 1st jury member	Day 3	Lost challenge	Day 35
Danni Boatwright Guatemala	43	Shawnee, Kansas	Sele			3rd voted out 2nd jury member	Day 6	Lost challenge	Day 35
Ethan Zohn Africa & All-Stars	45	Hillsborough, New Hampshire	Sele			4th voted out 3rd jury member	Day 9	Lost challenge	Day 35
Tyson Apostol (Returned to game)			Dakal			5th voted out	Day 11	1st returnee	Day 19
Rob Mariano Marquesas, All-Stars, Heroes vs. Villains & Redemption Island	43	Pensacola, Florida	Sele	Yara		6th voted out 4th jury member	Day 14	Lost challenge	Day 35
Parvati Shallow Cook Islands, Micronesia & Heroes vs. Villains	36	Los Angeles, California	Sele	Sele		7th voted out 5th jury member	Day 16	Lost challenge	Day 35
Sandra Diaz-Twine Pearl Islands, Heroes vs. Villains & Game Changers	44	Riverview, Florida	Dakal	Dakal		8th voted out	Day 16	Left game by raising sail	Day 16
Yul Kwon Cook Islands	44	Los Altos, California	Dakal	Sele		9th voted out 6th jury member	Day 18	Lost challenge	Day 35
Wendell Holland Ghost Island	35	Philadelphia, Pennsylvania	Dakal	Sele	Koru	10th voted out 7th jury member	Day 21	Lost challenge	Day 35
Adam Klein Millennials vs. Gen X	28	Los Angeles, California	Sele	Yara	Koru	11th voted out 8th jury member	Day 23	Lost challenge	Day 35
Tyson Apostol Tocantins, Heroes vs. Villains & Blood vs. Water	39	Mesa, Arizona	Dakal	None (Note: Natalie and Tyson were not assigned tribes during the tribe switch due to being on the Edge of Extinction.)	Koru	12th voted out 9th jury member	Day 25	Lost challenge	Day 35
Sophie Clarke South Pacific	29	Santa Monica, California	Dakal	Yara	Koru	13th voted out 10th jury member	Day 28	Lost challenge	Day 35
Kim Spradlin-Wolfe One World	36	San Antonio, Texas	Dakal	Dakal	Koru	14th voted out 11th jury member	Day 29	Lost challenge	Day 35
Jeremy Collins San Juan del Sur & Cambodia	41	Foxborough, Massachusetts	Sele	Dakal	Koru	15th voted out 12th jury member	Day 31	Lost challenge	Day 35
Nick Wilson David vs. Goliath	28	Williamsburg, Kentucky	Dakal	Sele	Koru	16th voted out 13th jury member	Day 34	Lost challenge	Day 35
Denise Stapley Philippines	48	Marion, Iowa	Sele	Dakal	Koru	17th voted out 14th jury member	Day 36		
Ben Driebergen Heroes vs. Healers vs. Hustlers	36	Boise, Idaho	Sele	Yara	Koru	18th voted out 15th jury member	Day 37		
Sarah Lacina Cagayan & Game Changers	34	Cedar Rapids, Iowa	Dakal	Yara	Koru	Eliminated; 16th jury member	Day 38		
Michele Fitzgerald Kaôh Rōng	29	Hoboken, New Jersey	Sele	Sele	Koru	2nd runner-up	Day 39		
Natalie Anderson San Juan del Sur	33	Edgewater, New Jersey	Sele	None	Koru	Runner-up	Day 39		
Tony Vlachos Cagayan & Game Changers	45	Jersey City, New Jersey	Dakal	Dakal	Koru	Sole Survivor	Day 39		

=== Future appearances ===
In 2022, Sandra Diaz-Twine subsequently competed on Australian Survivor: Blood V Water with her daughter, Nina Twine. In 2025, Parvati Shallow and Tony Vlachos represented the USA on Australian Survivor: Australia V The World.

==== Outside of Survivor ====
Natalie Anderson competed on the thirty-sixth season of MTV's The Challenge. Wendell Holland competed on the discovery+ special Beach Cabana Royale. Michele Fitzgerald competed on the thirty-seventh, thirty-eighth, thirty-ninth, and fortieth seasons of The Challenge, and also on the second season of The Challenge: USA.

In 2022, Ben Driebergen, Sarah Lacina and Tyson Apostol competed on the first season of The Challenge: USA. That same year, Kwon was a contestant on the USA Network reality competition series, Snake in the Grass.

In 2023, Driebergen and Lacina competed on The Challenge: World Championship.

In 2024, Diaz-Twine and Shallow competed on the second season of the Peacock reality TV series The Traitors. Rob Mariano joined NBC's new spin-off, Deal or No Deal Island, as a contestant.

In 2025, Holland appeared as a designer on Extreme Makeover: Home Edition. Shallow competed on the second season of Deal or No Deal Island. Mariano, Vlachos, and Collins competed on the third season of the Peacock reality TV series The Traitors. Danni Boatwright and Diaz-Twine competed on 99 to Beat.

In 2026, Anderson competed on the fourth season of The Traitors. Apostol competed on the third season of House of Villains. Spradlin-Wolfe competed on the HGTV show Rock the Block. Holland competed on the NBC show Destination X.

In 2027, Fitzgerald will compete on the sixth season of The Traitors.

== Season summary ==
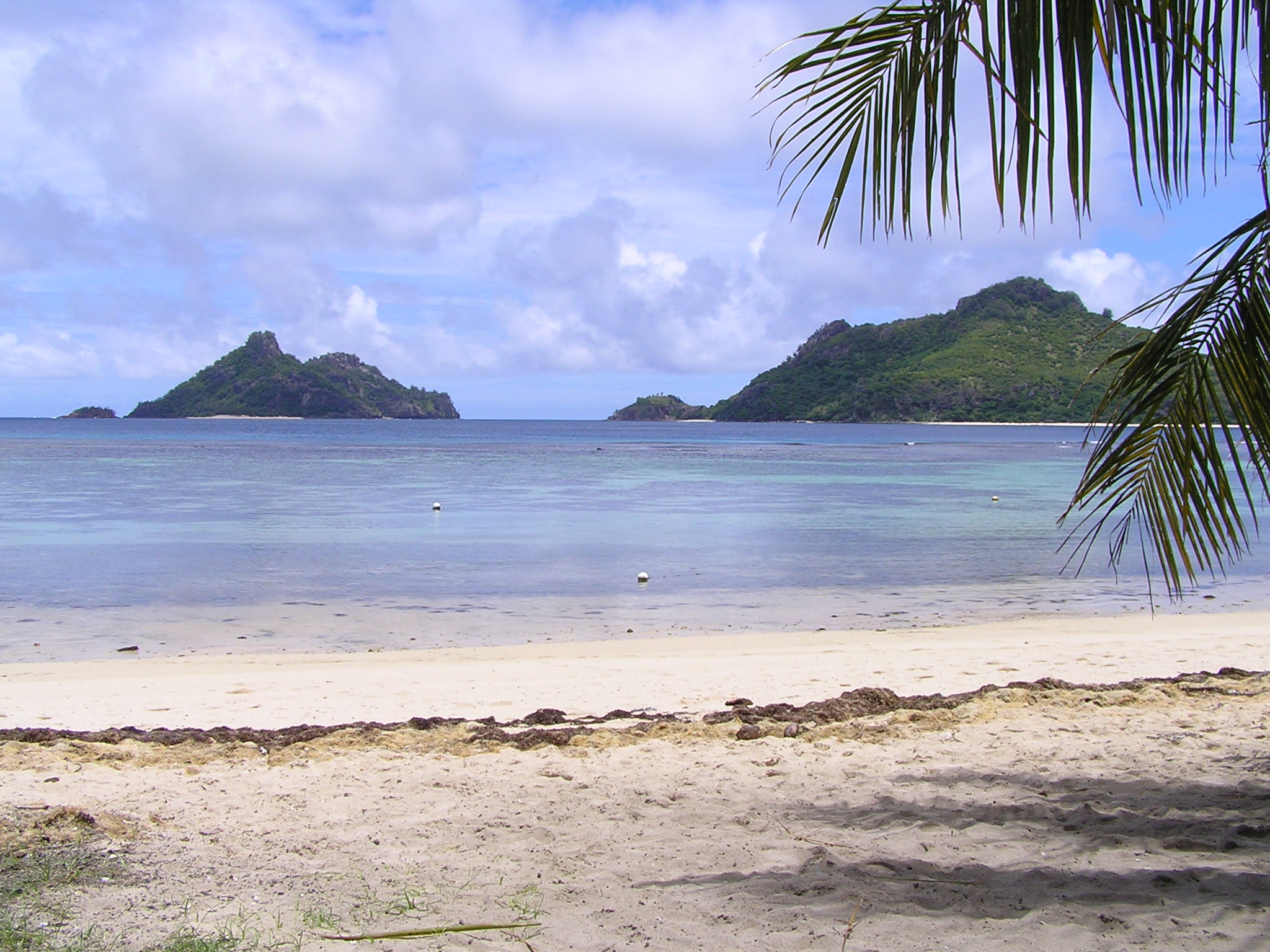
The season filmed in the Mamanuca Islands of Fiji.

Twenty former winners were divided into two tribes of ten: Sele and Dakal. Players with heavy connections outside of the game were targeted first, including Natalie (aligned with Jeremy) and Amber (married to Rob). The "old-school" players fared poorly early on; even after a tribe swap, every winner from the first half of Survivor's season history was eliminated before the merge. They were all sent to the Edge of Extinction to compete in challenges for the chance to earn fire tokens and sell advantages to players still in the game. The lone exception was Sandra, who raised the white flag and declined to remain on the Edge for a chance to earn her way back into the game.

On Day 19, Tyson rejoined the game in the first battle-back challenge and the tribes merged. Tyson joined players like Tony, Jeremy, and Ben in an effort to keep the big targets (the "lions") together to eliminate the more under-the-radar players (the "hyenas"). Tony felt threatened by Sarah and Sophie's growing connection, fearing that Sophie and Sarah would become a power duo. Tony led the charge of Sophie's blindside. However, the alliance of Tony and Sarah (self-dubbed "Cops R' Us") reconciled, and with free agents Ben and Nick controlled the majority of the votes post-merge, with Nick getting blindsided before the Edge of Extinction competition.

On Day 35, Natalie rejoined the game in the second battle-back challenge and found herself and Michele on the outside of a foursome including Tony, Sarah, Ben, and Denise. Natalie managed to survive thanks to two idol plays and a final immunity win, assisting in voting out Denise and Ben and forcing Tony to eliminate Sarah in an emotional firemaking challenge.

At the Final Tribal Council, most of the jurors had positive things to say to all three of them. Natalie was praised for her dominant Edge of Extinction gameplay, using multiple advantages and social connections to further herself in the game. Michele was praised for being an underdog, having many relaxed social connections with the jurors, and winning two immunity challenges when she needed to save herself. Tony was praised for being in Cops R Us with Sarah, having personal connections with multiple people, orchestrating multiple blindsides, and winning 4 immunity challenges. Even though Jeremy was mad at Tony for directly blindsiding too many people, Tony was awarded the title of Sole Survivor in a 12–4–0 vote over Natalie and Michele.

Challenge winners and eliminations by episodes
Episode			Challenge winner(s)		Eliminated	
No.	Title	Air date	Reward	Immunity	Tribe	Player
1	"Greatest of the Greats"	February 12, 2020	Dakal		Sele	Natalie
1	"Greatest of the Greats"	February 12, 2020	None	Sele	Dakal	Amber
2	"It's Like a Survivor Economy"	February 19, 2020	Dakal		Sele	Danni
3	"Out for Blood"	February 26, 2020	Dakal		Sele	Ethan
4	"I Like Revenge"	March 4, 2020	Sele		Dakal	Tyson
5	"The Buddy System on Steroids"	March 11, 2020	None (Note: There was no reward challenge due to the tribe switch.)	Sele	Yara	Rob
5	"The Buddy System on Steroids"	March 11, 2020	None	Dakal	Yara	Rob
6	"Quick on the Draw"	March 18, 2020	Yara		Sele	Parvati
6	"Quick on the Draw"	March 18, 2020	Yara		Dakal	Sandra
7	"We're in the Majors"	March 25, 2020	Yara (Note: There was an unaired reward challenge in this episode. Yara finished first and Sele finished second.)	Yara	Sele	Yul
7	"We're in the Majors"	March 25, 2020	Sele	Dakal	Sele	Yul
8	"This is Where the Battle Begins"	April 1, 2020	Tyson (Note: Returned to the game upon winning the Edge of Extinction challenge.)	Denise	Koru	Wendell
8	"This is Where the Battle Begins"	April 1, 2020	Tyson	Jeremy	Koru	Wendell
9	"War is Not Pretty"	April 8, 2020	Ben, Kim, Michele, ~~Sarah~~, (Nick), Sophie (Note: Sarah chose to give her reward to Nick.)	Kim	Koru	Adam
10	"The Full Circle"	April 15, 2020	None (Note: There was no reward challenge due to the family visit.)	Tony	Koru	Tyson
11	"This Is Extortion"	April 22, 2020	Ben, Kim, Nick, Sophie (Note: There was an unaired reward challenge in this episode.)	Tony	Koru	Sophie
12	"Friendly Fire"	April 29, 2020	None	Denise	Koru	Kim
12	"Friendly Fire"	April 29, 2020	None	Tony	Koru	Kim
13	"The Penultimate Step of the War"	May 6, 2020	None	Nick	Koru	Jeremy
13	"The Penultimate Step of the War"	May 6, 2020	None	Michele	Koru	Nick
14	"It All Boils Down to This"	May 13, 2020	Natalie	Michele	Koru	Denise
14	"It All Boils Down to This"	May 13, 2020	Michele [Denise, Sarah] (Note: For winning immunity, Michele also won a reward that was not aired. She shared her reward with Denise and Sarah.)	Michele	Koru	Denise
14	"It All Boils Down to This"	May 13, 2020	None	Tony	Koru	Ben
14	"It All Boils Down to This"	May 13, 2020	None	Natalie (Note: For winning the final Immunity Challenge, Natalie had to assign additional immunity to another player, with the remaining two competing in a fire-making challenge to determine the third finalist; she gave additional immunity to Michele.) [Michele]	Koru	Sarah

== Episodes ==
No. overall	No. in season	Title	Rating/share (18-49)	Original release date	U.S. viewers (millions)
583	1	"Greatest of the Greats"	1.3/7	February 12, 2020	6.68
Twenty returning winners arrived in Fiji to play an All-Winners season of Survivor. The two tribes of 10 (Dakal in red and Sele in blue) were informed that the grand prize this season would be $2 Million, and that the Edge of Extinction was in play. Lastly, Jeff introduced the Fire Tokens to the cast, where at their camps the tribes found out they could use their fire tokens to buy advantages and luxury items whenever they were at challenges. These fire tokens have to be bequeathed to another castaway upon getting voted out.: Reward/Immunity Challenge: In duos, the tribes compete to retrieve a ring on a post in the water. The first person to bring the ring to their tribe's post and touch it scores a point for their tribe. The first tribe to score 3 points wins flint and immunity. By Any Means Necessary challenge from Palau, Panama, Micronesia, Heroes vs. Villains, Caramoan, Millennials vs. Gen X, and Ghost Island.; After Sele's loss at the immunity challenge, Rob and Parvati realized they would be an unexpected duo. The new school players scrambled to put out a name, with Adam and Denise's early "looking for water" separation putting a target on their backs. When Ben approached Rob for strategy talk, he spilled that Danni had been suggesting Rob as one of the options. Rob confronted Danni and, impressed with her honesty, formed an old school alliance with her, Ethan, and Parvati. When Adam found out that Denise and himself were targets, he tried to shift the target onto players with previous relationships like Natalie and Jeremy, the two having previously played together in San Juan del Sur. While the tribe scrambled before Tribal Council, Rob and Parvati were dumbfounded that they were not the targets. At Tribal Council, Denise and Adam pushed for prior relationships to be targeted over second-time players. Eventually, a majority of the old school alliance decided to send Natalie to the Edge to split up her and Jeremy. As Natalie left Tribal Council, she chose to bequeath her fire token to Jeremy. During Natalie's first day on the Edge, she received an advantage and luxury item menu and was informed of finding ways to earn new fire tokens. Following a clue left by the Edge Sail, she discovered a hidden immunity idol that works for the next three Tribal Councils, which she could sell to anyone on the losing tribe. The first two days were relaxing for Dakal, with Sandra and Tony patching things up from Game Changers, and Yul & Sophie gathering other first-time returners Wendell and Nick into a group.: Immunity Challenge: The tribes must paddle out from shore to retrieve a bag full of numbers, before returning to a series of obstacles in the water (first leaping off boxed stairs into the water, then climbing over a rolling pillar, and lastly getting over a cargo net incline before reaching the shore). At their tribe's station, one member must unlock three rings using the 3 two-digit numbers in their bag. Afterward, two members must toss their rings to hang on paddles. The first tribe to successfully toss all 3 rings onto their paddles wins immunity. Blue Lagoon Bustle challenge from Blood vs. Water and Game Changers.; Sele claimed victory at the challenge, which also gave Denise her first-ever win at a tribal immunity challenge. At Dakal on Day 3, Yul and Sophie started recruiting the former Game Changers trio (Sandra, Sarah, and Tony) to target Amber, Kim, and Tyson. Sandra discovered an offer for an idol had appeared in her belongings for a fire token, which she accepted, correctly guessing that Natalie had made the offer from the Edge. Prior to the season, Tyson, Rob, Jeremy, and Kim had played in a televised Poker tournament with Tyson casually suggesting an alliance if the four of them were to play Survivor again. Kim and Amber felt the early pace of the game was overwhelming, with Kim shocked to find herself being actively left out of strategic talk by the majority of Dakal. At Tribal Council, all three tried to convince the tribe that there was no Poker Alliance in the game, with Amber and Kim trying to convince others to take out Nick for being the most recent winner. It was to no avail, with the disconnected players and the Game Changers trio sending Amber to the Edge fearing her natural alliance with her husband Rob at Sele. Before arriving at the Edge, Amber chose to bequeath her fire token to Rob.
584	2	"It's Like a Survivor Economy"	1.4/7	February 19, 2020	7.16
Early on Day 4, Rob from Sele discovered he had received a fire token, voicing his concerns to Parvati that it might mean either Amber or Sandra had been sent to the Edge. Later in the day, Ben worked on his social game by showing Denise how to look for an idol, which she eventually found. However, the idol was split into two halves. She had to give one half to tribemate before sundown. After choosing Adam to discuss tactics with, he convinced her not to share the idol with her suggestion, Parvati, but with Adam instead. At Dakal, Kim still felt she was on the bottom of the tribe and went on an idol hunt of her own. She found the Dakal split idol and revealed it to Sophie as an attempt to gain trust with a person in the majority. Despite a rocky first season playing together in Cagayan, Sarah and Tony sought to use their six-year friendship to solidify a true trustworthy "Cops-R-Us" alliance. On the Edge of Extinction, a new advantage clue had Amber and Natalie searching high and low throughout the island. After giving up for the day, Natalie discovered a "safety without power" advantage hidden inside the water well. The advantage allowed a player to leave Tribal Council and return to camp before the votes are cast to protect his or herself. Natalie chose to sell it to Jeremy for a fire token. He accepted the deal, guessing that it came from Natalie and realizing that the Sele tribe wasn't fully aware of the potential of the fire tokens.: Reward/Immunity Challenge: The tribes pushed a large wagon across an obstacle course, retrieved three keys from tall posts to unlock three heavy trunks with puzzle pieces inside, and put the trunks on the wagon. After loading all three trunks on the wagon, the tribes disassembled the wagon and pushed the wagon and trunks either through or over a fence. They then climbed over the fence themselves. They then re-assembled the wagon, put the trunks back on board, and dragged the wagon through more obstacles. Once at the finish, two tribe members used the pieces to assemble a vertical circular puzzle. The first tribe to finish wins a spice kit and immunity. Draggin' the Dragon challenge from Cagayan and Cambodia.; After seeing that his wife had been voted out, Rob fumbled in the puzzle portion of the challenge, leading to Sele's blowout loss. Since old school players were at a numerical disadvantage, Parvati and Rob wanted to target new school players, primarily Jeremy or Ben as outsiders. Danni felt vulnerable as her alliances and Parvati were leaving her out of conversations. Danni revealed to Ben, in front of Ethan, that there was an old school alliance in her attempts to plead her case. Ben suggested Danni as the best to vote out due to her scrambling, while Danni started to pitch a Parvati vote to Rob. Jeremy and Michele tried to recruit Adam to join in the plan. At Tribal Council, the Sele tribe spoke about the rapid pace of the game and that the old school players were struggling to keep up. Parvati spoke about an old school and new school divide, and Ben revealed Danni's slip-up earlier in the day as an example of Sele's paranoia. The resulting paranoia amongst Sele led Rob to ask the entire tribe to dump their bags and expose if they had an idol. Denise and Adam kept their idol halves hidden from the view of their tribemates while the rest of Sele revealed the contents of their bags. After a flurry of whispering among players, the entire tribe voted out Danni for her scrambling. Before arriving at the Edge, Danni bequeathed her fire token to Denise.
585	3	"Out for Blood"	1.4/7	February 26, 2020	7.14
After eliminating Danni, Adam sought to unite the new school players against Rob, Parvati, and Ethan, who he felt were running the tribe. Denise felt secure about her position in the tribe thanks to an extra fire token from Danni and her full idol (Adam had returned his half to her). At Dakal, the tribe continued to flourish thanks to Sandra netting a shark. Despite this, Tyson worked to gather numbers against Sandra in an attempt to get back on the plus side of the numbers. Yul had mixed feelings and ultimately told Sandra about Tyson's plot. The three players on the Edge had a chance for a fire token; Natalie deciphered the clue and found a paper stating there was a "vote steal advantage" hidden in an opposing tribe member's torch; she anonymously offered the advantage to Sarah on Dakal. After accepting the offer, Sarah had Tony camouflage her and she was able to retrieve the "vote steal" from Sele's torches.: Reward/Immunity Challenge: Castaways jumped between three sets of raised ramps, having to re-start if they fell. Tribes then dug a heavy ladder out of a sand pit, propped it upright so that one member could retrieve a monkey's fist on top of a tripod. They tossed the monkey's fist through a target in order to climb the first ramp of a tall tower. Afterwards, tribemates used their bodies to hoist each other to the top of a second ramp. Once at the top, two members solved a tree puzzle. The first tribe to finish their puzzle won immunity as well as chicken kebabs and a grill. Along the Watchtower challenge from Ghost Island.; Dakal edged out Sele for the victory. At camp, Adam, despite being in the majority with the new schoolers, attempted to get Denise, Ethan, and then Rob on board with voting out Parvati, to Rob's confusion and frustration. Jeremy was also wary of Adam and wanted to vote him out, but Michele had misgivings -- she insisted that despite Adam's duplicity they should preserve the new schoolers' numbers, suggesting an alternative strategy of weakening Rob and Parvati by blindsiding their close ally Ethan. At Tribal Council, the old schoolers voted against Adam, but Michele's plan came to fruition and Ethan was sent to the Edge of Extinction. Ethan chose to bequeath his fire token to Parvati.
586	4	"I Like Revenge"	1.4/7	March 4, 2020	7.08
Adam was stunned by Ethan's blindside and found himself as the outsider of Sele. Rob and Parvati feared the worst now that it was just them against the new schoolers. While Adam tried to regain his tribe's trust by doing more chores around camp, Rob convinced Jeremy and Michele that Adam was still playing both sides. On Dakal, morale was high thanks to the tribe's winning streak, but Tyson suspected that Yul had been leading an alliance of one-time winners against the people with connections. Tyson tried to warn Sandra and Tony to no avail as Sandra was still angry that Tyson threw her name around days ago. However, Sarah felt that keeping Tyson around was a good move for her since she had bonded with him. On the Edge, the four inhabitants were given a task to carry twenty logs, one at a time, from the top of the mountain back down to camp before sundown. They all struggled mightily, with Ethan almost fainting and requiring medical intervention near the end point, but all four completed the task and earned a fire token each.: Reward/Immunity Challenge: Three tribe members sat in a boat to which the other four members are tethered as swimmers. The swimmers towed the boat to a tower, where three sets of keys are to be collected. The tribes then headed to a platform, where they used the keys to unlock puzzle pieces. Two members of each tribe then used the pieces to solve a block puzzle. The first tribe to do so won immunity as well as four egg-laying chickens. Beyond the Wheel challenge from Edge of Extinction.; Dakal built up a substantial lead on the puzzle as Sele repeatedly struggled to get any of the keys. Adam managed to pull through and get all three himself. Afterwards on the puzzle, Rob and Michele breezed past Nick and Sarah, who had to undo initial piece placement, and won Sele their second challenge. Back at Dakal, Tyson targeted Nick for struggling on the puzzle as it was the same one he succeeded on back in David vs. Goliath. The rest of the tribe considered voting out Tyson. However, Tony wanted to assemble a group of big threats including Sarah, Kim, and Sandra to keep Tyson as shields for themselves. Although Sarah and Kim were on board, Sandra had doubts as she felt Tyson was too dangerous. At Tribal Council, Tyson voted for Nick, who voted for Kim on the chance Tyson had an idol. The rest of the tribe voted to send Tyson to the Edge. As Tyson left, he bequeathed his fire token to Nick.
587	5	"The Buddy System on Steroids"	1.4/6	March 11, 2020	6.91
Yul confided in Sarah and Wendell regarding his friend and former castmate Jonathan Penner's wife's ALS diagnosis. Upon arriving at their marooning site, the castaways were redistributed into three tribes of 5: Dakal consisted of Denise, Jeremy, Kim, Sandra, and Tony; Sele consisted of Michele, Nick, Parvati, Wendell, and Yul; Yara consisted of Adam, Ben, Rob, Sarah, and Sophie. On Dakal, Denise and Jeremy bonded with Kim, hoping to bring her into an alliance against Sandra and Tony. On Sele, Michele and Wendell, who previously dated, awkwardly reunited; she and Parvati agreed to target Wendell if it benefited their game. On Yara, Adam, Ben, and Rob shakily attempted to stick together to keep a majority against Sarah and Sophie. The tribe's search for an idol at the new camp resulted in Sophie finding it; she had to give half to a tribemate before sundown, and she chose Sarah.: Immunity Challenge: Tribes had to traverse an obstacle course and stack four colored blocks so that no color repeats on one side. The first two tribes to finish won immunity. Block in a Hard Place challenge, puzzle from Samoa, South Pacific, Blood vs. Water, Cambodia, and Millennials vs. Gen X.; Sele and Dakal came from behind to respectively place first and second, as Yara blew their large lead during the puzzle. Adam convinced Ben and Rob to target Sarah instead of Sophie, but Rob aimed to keep the entire tribe together at camp to avoid the potential for scrambling (a tactic that he had used to great personal effect in Redemption Island), much to the annoyance of several of his tribemates. Sarah gave Sophie her half of the idol back and debated playing her vote steal. At Tribal Council, neither Sarah nor Sophie played their advantages, but they weren't needed as Adam and Ben joined them in blindsiding Rob, who bequeathed his two fire tokens to Parvati before heading to the Edge.
588	6	"Quick on the Draw"	1.6/7	March 18, 2020	7.83
The Yara tribe celebrated a Rob-free morning after Tribal Council, with Ben improving his social game by bonding with Sarah and Sophie. Adam, however, felt that his position has weakened despite the necessary move to eliminate Rob. On the Edge, the castaways were given a clue to another advantage, which Tyson figured was hidden in the rocky tidal area near camp. Retrieving an idol nullifier, he sold it to Parvati on Sele for a fire token. He used the token to acquire a jar of peanut butter for himself.: Reward/Immunity Challenge: Starting from the shore, the tribes swam out to a boat and brought back three bags of rice. Before reaching their tribe mat, they pushed their bags through a wooden structure they had to climb over. Once on shore, they tore through their bags to collect 3 balls. Lastly, one tribe member navigated their balls to the center of a pulley maze. The first tribe to successfully land all 3 balls in the center of their pulley maze won immunity plus a food reward of peanut butter and jelly sandwiches. Rice Race challenge from Kaôh Rōng and Heroes vs. Healers vs. Hustlers.; With Yara narrowly beating Sele to win immunity, Sele and Dakal were left to scramble for Tribal Council after seeing that Rob had been sent to the Edge. Wendell and Michele's history saw the two struggle to make a plan when Michele told Wendell that she was considering voting for him so Parvati would bequeath her fire tokens to her. Wendell tried to sell his vote to Parvati for her fire tokens, but she chose to use that information to recruit Nick into making a big move. The vote sale was brought up in Tribal Council when Parvati tried to highlight Wendell's potential to betray Nick and Yul, but the men stuck together to send Parvati to the edge, voiding her idol nullifier. On her way out of Tribal Council, Parvati chose to bequeath her tokens to Michele. Meanwhile, on Dakal, Tony was left spooked by Rob's elimination, retreating to a new Spy Shack by Dakal's water well. Denise tried to solidify a bond with Kim and Sandra about protecting the women, knowing that she was the likely target if the tribe stuck to original tribal lines. Once out of hiding, Tony rallied Jeremy, Sandra, and Kim together to protect big threats. Sandra was skeptical about the idea knowing that she had connections on the other tribes, and decided to sell her idol to Denise for two fire tokens if she'd vote out either Tony or Jeremy. The two successfully negotiated a deal where Denise paid one fire token to Sandra before tribal with the idol, and would pay the second token after tribal. At Tribal Council, Jeremy tried to explain that it would be pointless to stick to original tribal lines, but remained nervous with Denise about the original Dakal trio's intentions. When Jeff asked the tribe if anyone wanted to play an idol, Denise stepped up and played Sandra's idol on herself. After returning to her seat, she surprised Dakal with her original idol and used it to protect Jeremy. When the votes were read, the entire Dakal tribe (plus Jeremy) had voted for Denise, with her sole vote sending a stunned Sandra to the Edge. Leaving Tribal Council, Sandra bequeathed her new fire token to Yul.
589	7	"We're in the Majors"	1.7/8	March 25, 2020	8.18
Sandra immediately decided to raise the sail on the Edge, believing she would have no chance of winning a challenge to get back in the game. The others on the Edge received a clue for four fire tokens hidden on top of the mountain; Tyson found one, but Rob found the other three. At Sele, Yul began to grow wary of Wendell's loyalty after the latter's open negotiation at their Tribal Council for fire tokens. Michele gave Wendell a fire token to extend trust to him, although she regretted it after he talked down to her. At Dakal, Kim considered siding with Jeremy and Denise against Tony if it would further her game. At Yara, Adam was convinced that Sarah or Ben had an idol; his paranoia turned his tribemates, specifically Sarah, against him.: Immunity Challenge: Tribes carried a large saucer to a water tower to fill it with water. They then carried it back to fill a well to release puzzle pieces. The first two tribes to finish their puzzle on the saucer won immunity. Dishwalla challenge from David vs. Goliath.; Yara maneuvered through the course more slowly than Dakal and Sele (making them less susceptible to spilling water), which proved to be effective as they finished first. Dakal earned second place over Sele by a narrow margin. Nick was frustrated with Wendell's trash-talking at the challenge, which he thought may have cost them the victory. Yul's plot to coax Wendell into giving Michele a fire token made Nick concerned about Yul's strategic prowess and ability to plan ahead, making him and Michele swing votes on whether to vote out Wendell or Yul. At Tribal Council, they chose to send Yul to the Edge; when tasked with bequeathing his fire tokens, he chose to split the two between Sarah and Sophie, giving them one each.
590	8	"This is Where the Battle Begins"	1.6/7	April 1, 2020	8.23
Edge of Extinction challenge: The competitors raced through an obstacle course to untie a bag with bamboo slats and twine hidden in the sand, which they tied together to create a pole long enough to retrieve a key on the other side of a gate. Once through, they navigated a ball up a vertical maze. The first player to get their ball to the top of the maze returned to the game. The remaining seven became the first members of the jury. Back in the Saddle challenge from Edge of Extinction.; All except Amber (who had given her token to Rob), Parvati, and Yul purchased an advantage to have their bags already dug up, with Natalie and Rob using the rest of their tokens for an idol if they won their way back into the game. Tyson beat Rob by inches and joined the newly merged Koru tribe. While setting up camp, Wendell and Jeremy befriended each other, but Jeremy joined with Ben, Tony, and Tyson against the less flashy players like Wendell and Nick. Meanwhile, Denise's huge move of single-handedly voting out Sandra raised concern among her tribemates.: Immunity Challenge: Castaways held onto a tall pole for as long as they could. If they fell off, they were out of the challenge. The last man and woman left standing would each win immunity and a fire token. Get a Grip challenge from Vanuatu, Cook Islands, Tocantins, Heroes vs. Villains, South Pacific, Blood vs. Water, Worlds Apart, and Game Changers.; Denise and Jeremy emerged victorious. Most of the remaining men targeted Nick over Wendell upon Jeremy's insistence that Wendell would work with them. Sophie was concerned at Jeremy's power, and shifted the majority's target onto his closest ally Wendell. Jeremy came to realize Wendell was being targeted over Nick and attempted to shift the vote to Adam instead, seeing Adam as an easy vote that the whole tribe could agree on. Adam grew paranoid over his spot in the game, but at Tribal Council, a reluctant Jeremy, along with the rest of the group except the post-swap Sele members, blindsided Wendell. Before arriving at the Edge, Wendell split his two fire tokens between Michele and Nick.
591	9	"War is Not Pretty"	1.5/6	April 8, 2020	7.85
Nick and Michele were livid about Wendell's elimination; while Nick, tired of being seen as the easy vote, vowed revenge, Michele tried to talk him out of doing something rash. Adam reflected on the similarity of a fleur-de-lis he noticed on the Tribal Council voting podium and Denise's split immunity idol from Day 4. Seeing an opportunity to gain trust with Michele, Adam told her he believed that there was an idol on Jeff's podium at Tribal Council.: Reward Challenge: Two teams of five were chosen through a schoolyard pick. Jeremy chose Adam, Nick, Tony, and Tyson to form the red team, while the blue team was led by Kim and consisted of Ben, Michele, Sarah, and Sophie. Denise, who was not chosen, was exempt from the challenge and had no shot at the reward. Castaways swam to retrieve a net filled with fish-shaped puzzle pieces. Once they brought it to shore, they carried the pieces to the final stage where they had to complete their puzzle. The first team to finish won Chinese takeout. New School challenge from Kaôh Rōng and Game Changers.; Kim, Ben, Michele, Sarah, and Sophie won reward, but Sarah decided to give her spot to Nick, as it was his birthday the day before and he had gotten blindsided by the last vote. Despite her claim that it wasn't to further her game, Denise and Jeremy felt it was a strategic move, and Adam expressed concern about Sarah's reputation for blindsiding friends. On the Edge, Parvati and Danni located an advantage that would give a player the chance to flip a coin for immediate immunity at any Tribal Council up until the final seven, shared the knowledge with others and chose to sell it to Michele for her four fire tokens.: Immunity Challenge: Castaways had to stand on three-dimensional triangular forms floating in the ocean, moving further up the side as the challenge progressed. Falling off or touching the form with any body part other than their hands would eliminate a castaway. The last one standing won immunity and a fire token. Bermuda Triangles challenge from Caramoan, Cagayan, Cambodia, and Heroes vs. Healers vs. Hustlers.; Kim won the challenge. The alliance of "big threats" agreed on splitting the vote between Nick and Adam, but Ben convinced them to split between Nick and Michele instead. Meanwhile, Nick convinced Tyson that Sophie was coming against him, but Adam rallied numbers against Sarah, Sophie's closest ally, instead. When Kim found out people were targeting Sarah, she worked with Tyson to flip the vote on Adam for having the ability to sway decisions. Adam's claim that Ben and Sarah were too close led to an argument with Ben, and several castaways scrambled to figure out a plan, with Tyson's name thrown around in the crossfire. This continued into Tribal Council; while the others whispered freely, Adam and Ben's conflict boiled over, with Ben getting mad at Adam for suspecting Sarah had an idol from when they were on Yara. Before the votes were read, Adam attempted to play the voting podium symbol believing it to be an idol, but was wrong and subsequently voted out. Adam bequeathed his fire token to Denise before going to the Edge.
592	10	"The Full Circle"	1.6/7	April 15, 2020	8.14
On day 24, the castaways were greeted by their loved ones; unlike previous seasons where one person would meet them for a reward challenge, entire families made the trip. Jeff also gave all the castaways time with their loved ones at camp. Meanwhile, on the Edge, those castaways were met by one or several loved ones each as well.: Immunity Challenge: Castaways held a rope to balance a wobbly table while stacking blocks spelling the word "immunity"; if any blocks fell, that castaway would have to re-stack them. The first to correctly stack all eight blocks and stand on the starting platform won immunity and two fire tokens. A Bit Tipsy challenge from Kaôh Rōng and Game Changers.; Tony won the challenge. At camp, Jeremy sought to break up a strong duo in Sarah and Sophie. Sarah wanted to get Kim out thinking she would win the game in the end, but Tony felt Tyson was the more pressing threat. Tony then got an idea to blindside Jeremy for his strong strategic game and coming after Sarah. Jeremy sensed something was up and considered using his "safety without power" advantage. Meanwhile, Sophie tried to talk Sarah into using her steal-a-vote. Two five-person alliances emerged among the scrambling: Denise, Jeremy, Kim, Michele, and Tyson targeted Sophie; Ben, Nick, Sarah, Sophie, and Tony targeted Jeremy. At Tribal Council, more whispering commenced. When Jeff said it was time to vote, Jeremy and Sarah both played their advantages. With Jeremy gone, the other alliance discussed who they were going to switch their vote to. Sarah took Denise's vote, and Kim played her idol from Dakal on Denise to negate two votes. While Sophie received two votes herself, Tyson was sent back to the Edge with five votes after Michele flipped; he had no fire tokens to bequeath.
593	11	"This Is Extortion"	1.5/6	April 22, 2020	8.16
Jeremy was upset about Tyson's elimination, as he was relying on him as a shield. Jeremy and Ben got into an argument, with each telling the other that they were the next biggest threats left. Early the next morning, Tony snuck out of camp and found an idol. Wanting to go back to the chaotic gameplay he used back in Cagayan, Tony pledged loyalty to the minority alliance, but Denise and Kim grew skeptical. On the Edge, Natalie and Parvati found a bottle containing a clue to the whereabouts of another advantage. They realized it was hidden underneath the shelter, and Parvati distracted the others while Natalie found an "Extortion" advantage; this allowed her to force somebody to pay a number of fire tokens or else they would be forced to sit out of the immunity challenge and would lose their next vote. She played it against Tony, who had three, but was able to obtain one each from Jeremy, Nick, and Ben to match the six-token fee. To cover up the fact that she had the 50-50 safety coin, Michele told Tony she had spent her fire tokens on an advantage for if she was sent to the Edge.: Immunity Challenge: Castaways balanced a statue on a slanted table using a pole. At regular intervals, they would move further away from the statue. If the statue fell off, that person would be eliminated. The last person left standing won immunity and two fire tokens. 10 Foot Pole challenge from Millennials vs. Gen X and Heroes vs. Healers vs. Hustlers.; Tony won his second immunity challenge in a row. Back at camp, Sarah approached the majority alliance with a plan to split the votes between Jeremy and Michele on the chance the former played an idol. Jeremy told the minority alliance that he wanted to vote Ben off, but Denise and Kim secretly decided to flip over to the majority and vote against Jeremy. However, Tony decided to take the opportunity to blindside somebody and approached Nick, Jeremy, and Michele about blindsiding Sophie who he felt was too tight with his closest ally Sarah. While Nick was up for it, Jeremy showed reluctance, because he wasn't sure if he trusted Tony when he told him that Denise and Kim were about to betray him. At Tribal Council, the majority alliance (including Denise and Kim) stuck to the plan and split the votes between Jeremy and Michele. However, Jeremy and Michele joined Tony and Nick, blindsiding Sophie and sending her to the Edge with an unused idol in her pocket. Sophie split her two fire tokens between Sarah and Kim.
594	12	"Friendly Fire"	1.5/6	April 29, 2020	8.08
An irate Sarah scolded Tony for leaving her in the dark at the last vote; to regain her trust, Tony told Sarah of his idol. He also told Ben, and evolved his "spy shack" strategy by making a "spy nest" in the trees, which only Sarah was aware of. Ben and Jeremy's conflict continued, while Kim rallied tribemates into voting Tony out next. Ben found an idol while searching with Tony, although Tony caught Ben trying to hide it from him. At the Edge, the 11 castaways were tasked with carrying 20 coconuts (one at a time) from one side of the island to the other. The first six to complete this task would earn two fire tokens each. The placements were Natalie, Sophie, Yul, Parvati, Tyson, and Wendell, with the other five (Danni, Amber, Rob, Adam, and Ethan) not earning any fire tokens.: Immunity Challenge: Castaways stood on a narrow beam while holding one arm above their head to keep a bucket of water from falling onto them. The last man and woman left standing each won immunity and two fire tokens. When It Rains, It Pours challenge from Africa, All-Stars, Micronesia, Heroes vs. Villains, One World, Millennials vs. Gen X, and David vs. Goliath.; Jeremy, Ben, and Sarah fell out early. During the challenge, Jeff offered peanut butter and cookies to anyone who would drop out. Kim and Michele accepted the offer, giving Denise immunity, while Tony accepted Nick's request for a fire token if Nick would drop out. This gave Tony his third consecutive immunity win. Back at camp, everyone initially agreed to vote Jeremy out. However, when Ben told Tony that Kim had been trying to make a move against him, Tony switched the plan, working to convince Ben, Sarah, and Jeremy to blindside Kim. Michele sensed Jeremy was still in danger and loaned him her 50/50 coin flip. At Tribal Council, Tony and Jeremy whispered to each other, leading to another live tribal. Amongst the whispers, Kim expressed concern that Tony, Sarah, and Ben were running the game, Sarah got a sense she was in trouble, and Denise lashed out when Jeremy tried to start a conversation with her, saying she wanted to get the vote over with. After the votes were cast, Tony openly offered to play his idol for Sarah while Jeremy mulled playing the coin flip. No advantages were played, and Sarah joined the men in sending Kim to the Edge. Kim split her three tokens between Sarah, Michele, and Denise.
595	13	"The Penultimate Step of the War"	1.4/5	May 6, 2020	7.57
Jeremy gave Michele's 50/50 coin back to her. The next morning, Sarah and Tony convinced Ben to target Nick rather than Jeremy, who they wanted to keep as a shield.: Immunity Challenge: Castaways must throw a ball up a track and move across trip lines to catch it. If they fail, they have to go back and throw it again. Once they have thrown two balls over and caught them, they must dig under a pole and get both balls through, before they solve a slide puzzle. The first castaway to do so won immunity and two fire tokens.; Nick won the challenge, foiling Tony's plan. Back at camp, Tony and Sarah were reluctant to vote out Jeremy, since that would expose them as the two largest threats left. As Michele's advantage was common knowledge among the tribe at this point, the majority agreed to split the votes between her and Jeremy, while Jeremy tried to rally tribemates against Ben. Nick emerged as a swing vote; at Tribal Council, Michele played the advantage and successfully negated two votes, while Jeremy was sent to the Edge. He bequeathed his two tokens to Michele. Michele, left out of another vote, confronted Nick about where his loyalties were. The next morning, she attempted to get the alliance of Ben, Sarah, and Tony to turn against each other by telling Sarah that Tony would be unbeatable at the end. At the Edge, Natalie continued her dominance at finding advantages; this new one would be sold to a castaway in order to give another competitor a disadvantage at the upcoming immunity challenge. She sold this to Nick for 8 tokens, and since he had only 6, he asked Michele to loan him the remaining two.: Immunity Challenge: Castaways must place blocks in a straight line while avoiding trip wires that leave for less space the farther down they are. They then must push a block so they all fall like dominoes and land on a gong. The first to do so won immunity and two fire tokens. Domino Effect challenge from Gabon, Redemption Island, Blood vs. Water, Kaôh Rōng, and Game Changers.; Nick anonymously willed the disadvantage to Ben, meaning he would have to set up a 30% longer line of blocks. Michele won the challenge, thwarting the majority's plan to oust her. As it was the last day to use fire tokens, Denise proposed everyone eat the rest of the rice so she could buy more and be more prepared for the second re-entry challenge if she were to get voted out. Ben and Denise had targeted Nick, while Michele and Nick targeted Denise. Tony's spy nest allowed him to listen in on Denise forming a final three with Sarah and Ben, which made him talk to Sarah about possibly voting out Denise instead. However, at Tribal Council, he and Sarah joined Denise and Ben in sending Nick to the Edge. On Day 35, both groups were informed that the second and final re-entry challenge would take place today, and the group from the Edge prepared accordingly. Yul, Parvati, Wendell, Tyson, and Sophie each bought one advantage, and Natalie, having amassed sixteen tokens, bought three advantages, a jar of peanut butter, and a hidden immunity idol that she gave to Tyson, with whom she shared her peanut butter.
596	14	"It All Boils Down to This"	1.6/7	May 13, 2020	7.94
The remaining competitors on the Edge of Extinction arrived at the second and final re-entry challenge.: Edge of Extinction challenge: The castaways were attached to a rope woven through a series of obstacles. They then guided two balls through a table maze. The first one to finish returned to the game. Second returnee challenge from Edge of Extinction.; Natalie won the challenge, and the other Edge competitors became official members of the jury. Natalie reconnected with Michele, who was on the outside of the foursome containing Tony, Sarah, Ben, and Denise. Natalie informed Michele that she had an idol and vowed to use it to further both of their interests. She also told the remaining castaways that the jury was convinced Tony would win if he made it to the end in an attempt to shake up their alliance. This frustrated Sarah, who felt she wasn't receiving credit for making the same moves as Tony because she was a woman.: Immunity Challenge: The castaways must race through an obstacle course and a giant water slide to retrieve three sandbags one at a time. The sandbags contain puzzle pieces to a three-tiered puzzle; the first to complete the puzzle won immunity.; Despite falling behind early, Michele won the immunity challenge. Worried about a potential idol, Tony tried to convince his allies to split the votes between Natalie and Denise, but they dismissed his concerns and planned to pile all their votes on Natalie. After Natalie played her idol at Tribal Council, Tony and Ben were forced to play theirs, and all four votes for Natalie plus two for Ben were negated. With Denise and Sarah the only two eligible to receive votes, Denise was sent to the jury in a unanimous revote. Tony spent the following night searching the island for idols, but failed to locate one. Natalie began her own search at dawn and successfully found an idol.: Immunity Challenge: The castaways must race from a platform in the ocean and traverse a ramp obstacle, then cross a balance beam without falling, retrieving a key halfway across. The key unlocks two sandbags, which the castaways must toss onto a small target. The first to land both of their sandbags on the target won immunity.; Tony won his fourth immunity challenge. He then convinced Sarah to engage Natalie in strategy talk at the water well while he spied on the conversation from his spy nest. Sarah convinced Natalie to reveal her idol and shared the news with Tony and Ben. The threesome initially planned to vote for Michele, but Ben gave Sarah permission to vote him out to help her game, feeling that his Survivor journey was complete. Sarah switched her vote to Ben at Tribal Council, sending him to the jury over Michele after Natalie's irrelevant idol play on herself.: Immunity Challenge: The castaways, with one hand tied behind their back, must drop a ball into a metal chute, which travels down a spiraling metal track. A turnstile gate in the middle of the track rotates with every ball, causing the ball to alternate exiting out of the two exits. The castaways must catch the ball and drop it back into the chute at the top. Every few minutes, an additional ball is added to the track until up to seven balls are active on the track. If a ball exits the track and is not caught, the castaway is eliminated; the last one remaining won immunity. "Simmotion" challenge from Tocantins, Cambodia and David vs. Goliath.; Natalie won the final immunity challenge. Tony, Michele, and Sarah all practiced fire that afternoon as Natalie contemplated her decision. At Tribal Council, Natalie elected to take Michele with her to the Final 3 and force Tony and Sarah to make fire.: Fire Making Challenge: Tony was the first to get flame by using lots of coconut husk, Sarah's fire built higher and was well into the rope. However, despite the early lead by Sarah, her flame died down quickly allowing Tony to come back and win the challenge making Sarah the final member of the jury.; At the Final Tribal Council, all three finalists highlighted their unique journeys to the end: Tony's dominant strategic play, Michele's underdog story playing from the bottom, and Natalie's resilience on the Edge and hard work earning advantages. The jurors agreed that Natalie dominated the Edge of Extinction portion of the game, but felt Tony had a much stronger social and strategic game. They awarded Tony the title of Sole Survivor and the $2 million prize in a 12–4–0 vote over Natalie and Michele, respectively.

== Voting history ==
	Original tribes					Switched tribes				Merged tribe											
Episode	1		2	3	4	5	6		7	8	9	10		11	12	13		14			
Day	2	3	6	9	11	14	16		18	21	23	25		28	29	31	34	36		37	38
Tribe	Sele	Dakal	Sele	Sele	Dakal	Yara	Sele	Dakal	Sele	Koru	Koru	Koru		Koru	Koru	Koru	Koru	Koru		Koru	Koru
Eliminated	Natalie	Amber	Danni	Ethan	Tyson	Rob	Parvati	Sandra	Yul	Wendell	Adam	Tyson		Sophie	Kim	Jeremy	Nick	None (Note: Ben and Natalie played hidden immunity idols; therefore two votes against Ben and four votes against Natalie did not count. As there were no counted ballots, all the castaways then revoted between those who weren't immune. As Michele had won the immunity challenge and Tony had played an idol on himself as well, Denise and Sarah were left as the only non-immune players; since both could only vote for each other and their votes would cancel each other out, neither of them cast a vote during the revote.)	Denise	Ben	Sarah
Votes	7–2–1	6–3–1	8–1	4–3–1	7–1–1	4–1	3–2	1–0 (Note: Denise played a hidden immunity idol on herself; therefore four votes against her were not counted.)	3–1	9–3	8–2–1	5–2–0 (Note: Kim played a hidden immunity idol on Denise; therefore two votes against her were not counted.)		4–3–2	5–3	3–2–0 (Note: Michele played a 50/50 immunity coin on herself; therefore two votes against her were not counted.)	4–2	0–0	4–0	3–2	None (Note: For winning the final Immunity Challenge, Natalie had to assign additional immunity to another castaway, with the remaining two competing in a fire-making challenge to determine the third finalist; she gave additional immunity to Michele, and Tony defeated Sarah in the fire-making challenge)
Voter	Vote																				Challenge
Tony		Kim			Tyson			~~Denise~~		Wendell	Adam	Tyson		Sophie	Kim	Jeremy	Nick	~~Natalie~~	Denise	Michele	Won
Natalie	Denise																	~~Ben~~	Denise	Ben	Immune
Michele	Denise		Danni	Ethan			Wendell		Yul	Adam	Adam	Tyson		Sophie	Jeremy	Ben	Denise	~~Ben~~	Denise	Ben	Saved
Sarah		Kim			Tyson	Rob				Wendell	Nick	~~Denise~~	Tyson (Note: This player used a vote stealer advantage, allowing them to steal one vote from another player and cast two ballots.)	Michele	Kim	~~Michele~~	Nick	~~Natalie~~	None	Ben	Lost
Ben	Natalie		Danni	Ethan		Rob				Wendell	Adam	Tyson		Jeremy	Kim	Jeremy	Nick	~~Natalie~~	Denise	Michele	
Denise	Natalie		Danni	Ethan				Sandra		Wendell	Nick	None (Note: This player lost their vote as another player used a vote stealer advantage.)		Jeremy	Jeremy	~~Michele~~	Nick	~~Natalie~~	None		
Nick		Amber			Kim		Parvati		Yul	Adam	Adam	Tyson		Sophie	Kim	Jeremy	Denise				
Jeremy	Adam		Danni	Ethan				~~Denise~~		Wendell	Adam	None (Note: This player played their safety without power advantage. This allowed them to leave Tribal Council; they could not vote, but also could not be voted against at this Tribal Council.)		Sophie	Kim	Ben					
Kim		Amber			Tyson			~~Denise~~		Wendell	Adam	Sophie		Michele	Jeremy						
Sophie		Kim			Tyson	Rob				Wendell	Adam	~~Denise~~		Jeremy							
Tyson		Amber			Nick					Wendell	Adam	Sophie									
Adam	Natalie		Danni	Parvati		Rob				Wendell	Sarah										
Wendell		Amber			Tyson		Parvati		Yul	Adam											
Yul		Amber			Tyson		Parvati		Wendell												
Sandra		Amber			Tyson			~~Denise~~													
Parvati	Natalie		Danni	Adam			Wendell														
Rob	Natalie		Danni	Adam		Sarah															
Ethan	Natalie		Danni	Adam																	
Danni	Natalie		Parvati																		
Amber		Nick																			

Jury vote
Episode	14		
Day	39		
Finalist	Tony	Natalie	Michele
Votes	12–4–0		
Juror	Vote		
Sarah	Yes		
Ben	Yes		
Denise	Yes		
Nick	Yes		
Jeremy		Yes	
Kim	Yes		
Sophie	Yes		
Tyson		Yes	
Adam	Yes		
Wendell	Yes		
Yul	Yes		
Parvati		Yes	
Rob	Yes		
Ethan		Yes	
Danni	Yes		
Amber	Yes		

== Production ==
The season's theme and players were announced at the finale of Survivor: Island of the Idols on December 18, 2019, revealing that the season would consist of 20 winners from past Survivor seasons. The winner would receive $2,000,000, the largest cash prize ever given out in American reality TV history since The X Factor.

In addition to the larger grand prize, the payouts for all contestants were increased for this season only: whereas in previous seasons the first contestant eliminated received US$2,500 with increasing payouts for subsequently eliminated contestants, each returning player in Winners at War was guaranteed a minimum US$25,000 payment for participating in the season.

Due to the ongoing coronavirus pandemic, the typical live reunion show following the two-hour finale episode did not take place, but instead, the finale ran for three hours, with the final segments featuring Probst video chatting with the final three to announce the winner. Probst's segments were recorded on a small makeshift set in his home garage. All 20 contestants also appeared on screen together via video chat at the beginning of the finale from their homes.

== Casting ==
When asked about the possibility of an all-winners season during a 2018 interview with Us Weekly, host and executive producer Jeff Probst stated that it was unlikely, saying, "we have 10 great winners that you'd want to see play again. We don't have 20. We don't have 18. Some of the winners don't want to play again. Some of the greats are like, 'No, we're done.'" In 2019, CBS president Kelly Kahl, who had been a proponent of Survivor since its beginning, suggested the idea again to Probst as a way to celebrate the show's 20th anniversary, and nearly all of the previous winners that were asked accepted the offers to return. Among those who accepted who the production team had considered unlikely to return were married couple Rob and Amber Mariano, who had begun their relationship while competing on Survivor: All-Stars, and Survivor: Micronesia winner Parvati Shallow, who had initially declined the offer as she had recently given birth. Probst has cited those three accepting the offers as the impetus to move forward with the season.

Among those that did not return included John Cochran, winner of Survivor: Caramoan, whom Jeff Probst called "the only one that would have been on the list [where] if he had said yes would probably have a spot on the show" in an interview with Entertainment Weekly. Richard Hatch, winner of the show's first season, Survivor: Borneo, was not included due to his behavior in Survivor: All-Stars in which he competed in a challenge naked and his genitals made incidental contact with another contestant, Susan Hawk, who quit the game shortly thereafter. "Given his history on our show, it did not seem appropriate", said Probst to Us Weekly. "We were in a different time and different culture back then and we would never let him run a challenge naked now." In that same interview, Probst revealed that Survivor: Palau winner Tom Westman was among the castaways who was ultimately cut. According to Inside Survivor both Tina Wesson, winner of Survivor: The Australian Outback, and Mike Holloway, winner of Survivor: Worlds Apart, were included in the mix for casting but cut along the way. Additionally, Survivor: Fiji winner Earl Cole was contacted, but declined due to the birth of his child. Survivor: Panama winner Aras Baskauskas was also contacted but declined, feeling unwilling to leave his children. Survivor: China winner Todd Herzog confirmed on the Talking with T-Bird podcast that he was contacted and considered, but ultimately cut. Survivor: Gabon winner Bob Crowley was not contacted to compete. Survivor: Marquesas winner Vecepia Towery confirmed on the Talking with T-Bird podcast that she was not contacted to compete. Survivor: Edge of Extinction winner Chris Underwood was asked to return, but he declined when he received the call just 12 hours after getting married. Survivor: Thailand winner Brian Heidik was not contacted to compete. Survivor: The Amazon winner Jenna Morasca confirmed on the Talking with T-Bird podcast that she was not contacted to compete. Survivor: Nicaragua winner Jud "Fabio" Birza was not contacted to compete. It is unknown if Chris Daugherty (Winner of Survivor: Vanuatu), James "J.T." Thomas Jr. (Winner of Survivor: Tocantins) or Natalie White (Winner of Survivor: Samoa) were ever contacted. As Tommy Sheehan had not yet been announced as Winner of the previous season Survivor: Island of the Idols, he was not considered for the cast.

While Denise Stapley was the oldest player to play the game, her age of 48 was much lower than many other seasons' oldest players. Nonetheless, the average age of the players for this season is the highest of any other prior season at 37.85 years, beating out Survivor: Nicaragua's average age of 37.6 years, and much higher than the average ages of players from several of the past recent seasons which have skewed younger. Probst said they did not even consider the age of the players when asking the winners to return, though did feel that older players are more interesting to watch, as their maturity brings unique facets to the game.

== Game format ==
All but two of the challenges during the season were based on previous challenges that at least one of the winners had participated in. While this had been done before in Survivor: All-Stars, Survivor: Heroes vs. Villains, Survivor: Cambodia and Survivor: Game Changers, Probst stated that they would not draw attention to who had done previous challenges unless there had been a major event involving it from a prior season.

This season reintroduced the Edge of Extinction from Survivor: Edge of Extinction, the show's thirty-eighth season, wherein contestants who are voted out are taken to a desolate, abandoned beach with fewer amenities than the tribe camps. Contestants on the Edge of Extinction may either wait for an opportunity to rejoin the main game by winning a competition or may choose to leave the game at any point by raising a white sail. Unlike in Survivor: Edge of Extinction, Winners at War contestants were not given the option to decline heading to the Edge of Extinction, though they could raise the mast immediately upon arrival. While the Edge of Extinction had been controversial with fans when it was first used, the element was added for this season as an assurance to returning players of additional chances to get back into the game after being voted out, a concern that had been raised by some when Probst spoke to them about returning.

This season introduced "fire tokens", a currency that allows players to purchase comfort items, food, and advantages. Probst said that the producers had come up with the idea of fire tokens to emphasize that the game is about creating a society, and these tokens could help in establishing that society. Each player started the game with one token, but could give tokens to other players at any time. When voted out, players must bequeath all of their tokens to remaining players before heading to the Edge of Extinction. Players on the Edge of Extinction were given the chance to win fire tokens by either finding advantages and privately selling them to remaining players, or by completing tasks; the players could then use the tokens at the Edge of Extinction to buy comfort items, food or advantages, including advantages for the eventual challenge to return to the main game.

== Reception ==
Winners at War received generally mixed reviews from critics, who praised the all-winners cast, gameplay and memorable moments but criticized the return of the Edge of Extinction twist, the early exits of some fan favorite players and the editing. The season's all-stars cast was amongst the chief aspects to have been widely praised by television critics. Commentators variously described Tony Vlachos as the "most entertaining" and Michele Fitzgerald as "one of the best social players in the history of the game". Fitzgerald's jury speech drew much attention and has been widely praised; while former contestant Richard Hatch felt that "everything came together" for Fitzgerald in the final speech, Katie Baker of The Ringer highlighted her ability to encapsulate her journey as "excellent". Such former players as Andrea Boehlke, Peih-Gee Law, and David Wright were especially appreciative of her social game and underdog story in an Entertainment Weekly roundtable previewing the finale. Others including Cirie Fields, Eliza Orlins and Jonathan Penner favoured Vlachos' dominant game. Orlins summarised Vlachos saying "he has not had a single vote cast against him, [has placated] even those he has not voted with [and] won multiple individual challenges."

Other than the two finalists, players including Sarah Lacina, Denise Stapley, Kim Spradlin-Wolfe, and Sophie Clarke were also noted for their strong performances. Collectively, the six contestants won 10 of the 13 Player of the Week awards (three each for Vlachos and Fitzgerald, two for Clarke) in fan polls on the website Inside Survivor. Clarke, who was vocal about feeling like a "bottom-tier winner" coming into season, grew increasingly popular during the pre-merge game and was noted for her role in blindsiding the likes of Rob Mariano and Wendell Holland. Several commentators praised her understated style of play and puzzle-solving skills. Writing for Vulture, Martin Holmes called her "a force this season, corralling the numbers, finding idols, and taking charge when necessary".

Holmes gave a positive review of Winners at War. While he stated that it "hasn't been a perfect season" due to the Edge of Extinction remaining "a flawed twist", all old-school players being voted out early, and the editing, he praised the season's humor, emotional moments, the final three, and the eventual winner. Reviewing the finale, he highlighted Vlachos' "high-wire trickery, master manipulation, and control of the votes" and Fitzgerald's "scrappy, socially adept, but under the radar" game. Holmes would later rank this season 13th out of 40. Dalton Ross of Entertainment Weekly gave the finale a positive review, calling Vlachos a highly entertaining player: "no one else mixes game sense and nonsense more than him". He also praised Fitzgerald's tenacious game, survival instinct, and final jury speech, saying that "it's pretty impossible not to be happy for her". Dalton would ultimately rank Winners at War as the 9th best Survivor season. In 2021, Rob Has a Podcast ranked Winners at War 7th during their Survivor All-Time Top 40 Rankings podcast. In 2024, Nick Caruso of TVLine ranked this season 9th out of 47.

Holmes was critical of the "nightmarish" Edge of Extinction twist; he said: "under normal circumstances, I'd have been rooting for [Natalie Anderson]. But it demonstrates the inherent flaw in the Edge. It punishes those who make it far while rewarding those voted out earlier." Ross also criticized the return of the Edge of Extinction, stating "This isn't even about fairness or anything like that — although Nick lasting all the way to day 34 and having zero opportunities to earn a single token before the competition certainly is anything but fair — but more about what makes for a more dramatic and intriguing contest."

At the conclusion of the season, the three finalists were added to The Ringer's Hall of Fame of Survivor players, which already consisted of fellow Winners at War contestants Mariano, Sandra Diaz-Twine, and Parvati Shallow. For their performances over the course of multiple seasons, Lacina and Spradlin-Wolfe were also added to the list, as were Jeremy Collins, Tyson Apostol, Ethan Zohn, and Yul Kwon.

== Reception ==
The season was preceded by a retrospective special titled Survivor at 40: Greatest Moments and Players on February 5, 2020, which featured interviews with past players, series highlights and the first few minutes of the premiere episode.

== Viewing figures ==
=== United States ===
Viewership and ratings per episode of Survivor: Winners at War
No.	Title	Air date	Rating/share (18–49)	Viewers (millions)	DVR (18–49)	DVR viewers (millions)	Total (18–49)	Total viewers (millions)	Ref.
1	"Greatest of the Greats"	February 12, 2020	1.3/7	6.68	0.6	2.70	2.0	11.40	
2	"It's Like a Survivor Economy"	February 19, 2020	1.4/7	7.16	0.6	2.36	2.0	9.54	
3	"Out for Blood"	February 26, 2020	1.4/7	7.14	0.5	2.29	1.9	9.45	
4	"I Like Revenge"	March 4, 2020	1.4/7	7.08	0.6	2.30	2.0	9.40	
5	"The Buddy System on Steroids"	March 11, 2020	1.4/6	6.91	0.6	2.21	2.0	10.13	
6	"Quick on the Draw"	March 18, 2020	1.6/7	7.83	0.6	2.13	2.1	9.98	
7	"We're in the Majors"	March 25, 2020	1.7/8	8.18	0.5	1.90	2.2	10.10	
8	"This Is Where the Battle Begins"	April 1, 2020	1.6/7	8.23	0.5	2.00	2.1	10.23	
9	"War is Not Pretty"	April 8, 2020	1.5/6	7.85	0.5	1.89	2.0	9.75	
10	"The Full Circle"	April 15, 2020	1.6/7	8.14	0.5	1.99	2.1	10.13	
11	"This is Extortion"	April 22, 2020	1.5/6	8.16	0.5	1.88	2.0	10.05	
12	"Friendly Fire"	April 29, 2020	1.5/6	8.08	0.5	1.80	2.0	9.89	
13	"The Penultimate Step of the War"	May 6, 2020	1.4/5	7.57	0.6	1.95	2.0	9.54	
14	"It All Boils Down to This"	May 13, 2020	1.6/7	7.94	0.5	1.99	2.1	9.95	

=== Canada ===
No.	Air date	Total viewers (millions)	Rank (week)	Refs
1	February 12, 2020	2.13	2	
2	February 19, 2020	2.05	3	
3	February 26, 2020	2.03	5	
4	March 4, 2020	2.19	2	
5	March 11, 2020	2.02	3	
6	March 18, 2020	2.21	1	
7	March 25, 2020	2.14	3	
8	April 1, 2020	2.09	6	
9	April 8, 2020	2.15	3	
10	April 15, 2020	2.21	5	
11	April 22, 2020	2.13	5	
12	April 29, 2020	2.30	1	
13	May 6, 2020	2.28	2	
14	May 13, 2020	2.39	2	
