= Nick Wilson (politician) =

American politician (born 1990)

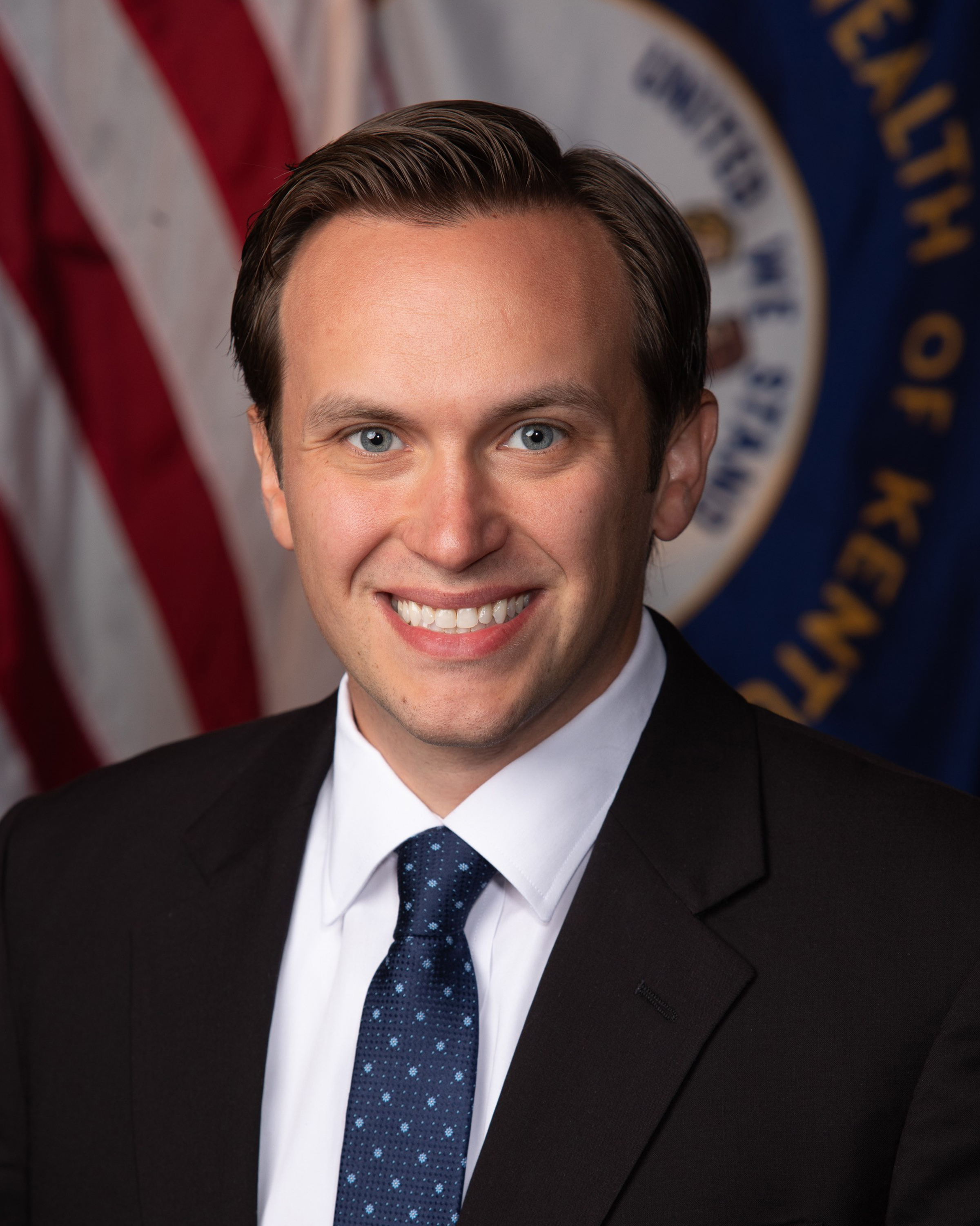
- Official portrait, 2023

Member of the Kentucky House of Representatives from the 82nd district
- Incumbent
- Assumed office January 1, 2023
- Preceded by: Regina Bunch

Personal details
- Born: Nicolas Joseph Caleb Wilson; June 11, 1990 (age 36)
- Party: Republican
- Education: University of Kentucky (BS); University of Alabama School of Law (JD)
- Occupation: Attorney
- Committees: Families & Children; Judiciary; Tourism & Outdoor Recreation

Nicolas Joseph Caleb Wilson (born June 11, 1990) is an American politician currently serving as a Republican member of the Kentucky House of Representatives from Kentucky's 82nd House district. His district includes Whitley County and part of Laurel County. He also won the reality competition show Survivor.

Wilson was voted the winner of Survivor's thirty-seventh season, Survivor: David vs. Goliath, in 2018, and returned in 2020 for the fortieth season, Survivor: Winners at War, to compete against former winners in the Survivor franchise, where he finished in seventh place.

He is a candidate for Kentucky secretary of state in 2027.

== Early life and education ==
Wilson grew up in Williamsburg, Kentucky. Wilson's parents divorced while he was growing up. His grandmother helped raise him and his four siblings while they stayed with their father. He became the first person in his family to graduate from college when he completed a Bachelor's degree in political science from the University of Kentucky in 2013. While at UK, he became a member of Kappa Sigma (Beta-Nu) fraternity, and interned for Congressman Hal Rogers. After graduation, he went on to the University of Alabama School of Law. However, while in law school, his mother died due to a drug overdose.

== Career ==
Following his mother's death, Wilson felt a responsibility to return to his hometown and help his community. After graduating with a Juris Doctor degree in 2016, Wilson became a public defender, and focused on helping fight the opioid epidemic. In January 2019, he began working as an assistant commonwealth's attorney for Kentucky's 34th judicial circuit.

As of 2026, he has his own private law practice in Williamsburg.

== Survivor ==
=== David vs. Goliath ===
In 2018, Wilson was selected to appear on the thirty-seventh season of the reality television show Survivor, Survivor: David vs. Goliath. He described himself as a "super fan" of the show, who had a lifelong dream to be a competitor.

As part of the original David tribe, Wilson was initially seen as lazy but he soon became an aggressive alliance-builder, crafting one-on-one allegiances with several players in the game. A tribe swap occurred on Day Ten, putting Wilson on the Jabeni tribe with Torres and three former Goliaths: Natalie Cole, Mike White and Angelina Keeley. During his time on Jabeni, Wilson aligned with White and Keeley, which would become a crucial fulcrum in the rest of the season.

At the Final Six, Wilson won his first immunity challenge of the season. During this time, he strengthened his bonds with Keeley and White, agreeing to a Final Three deal. He went on to win the final immunity challenge of the season, becoming the only player from the season to win multiple immunities as well as guaranteeing his spot in the Final Tribal Council.

Since the introduction of the final four forced fire-making challenge, Wilson is the first castaway to win the Final Immunity Challenge, not compete in the fire-making tiebreaker, and go on to win the season. During the Final Tribal Council, Wilson's impassioned speech swayed seven of the ten jurors to vote for him, giving him the title of Sole Survivor. With his victory, Wilson became the ninth winner in Survivor history to win the game while receiving zero votes cast against them the entire game.

=== Winners at War ===
He returned to compete on the show's first all-winners season, Survivor: Winners at War. Wilson was initially a part of the Dakal tribe. While he would receive one vote in both the first two Tribal Councils he attended, he was not voted out. At the merge, Wilson found himself on the bottom for the first couple of votes, before finding himself in a good spot. He won a crucial immunity challenge at the Final Seven, which was needed as he was the target. At the Final Six (before the last Edge of Extinction re-entry challenge), Wilson received an advantage from Natalie Anderson (who was on Edge of Extinction), which allowed him to give another player a disadvantage in the immunity challenge, and he would need to pay eight Fire Tokens to purchase this. Wilson, who had six tokens, got two tokens from Michele Fitzgerald and purchased the advantage. He used the advantage against Ben Driebergen at the immunity challenge. However, Wilson was voted out that night, as Sarah Lacina felt that his underdog story made him a threat. Wilson was eliminated from the game after failing to win the final re-entry Edge of Extinction challenge.

At the Final Tribal Council, Wilson voted for Tony Vlachos to win. Vlachos ended up winning in a 12–4–0 vote, making him the series' second two-time winner.

== Political career ==
=== Kentucky House of Representatives ===
In November 2021, Wilson announced that he was running for a seat in the Kentucky House of Representatives, for the 82nd District, which includes his hometown of Williamsburg. Wilson, who is a Republican, was endorsed by retiring incumbent Regina Huff, and was unopposed in both the primary and general election. He was unopposed for reelection in 2024 and 2026.

During his tenure, Wilson has served as vice chair of the House Committee on Families and Children.

=== 2027 Kentucky secretary of state election ===
In August 2026, Wilson publicly expressed interest in running for secretary of state of Kentucky in 2027. He launched his campaign in November.

== Personal life ==
On January 14, 2019, Wilson received the key to the city of Williamsburg and was given his own day, "Nick Wilson Day," on January 16.

Wilson is married to Grisel Vilchez, who is also an attorney.

Preceded by Wendell Holland	Winner of Survivor; Survivor: David vs. Goliath	Succeeded by Chris Underwood
