= Survivor: Island of the Idols =

Season of television series

- Season 39
- Region 1 DVD cover
- Presented by: Jeff Probst
- No. of days: 39
- No. of castaways: 20
- Winner: Tommy Sheehan
- Runner-up: Dean Kowalski
- Location: Mamanuca Islands, Fiji
- Sia Fan Favourite Prize: Janet Carbin; Jamal Shipman; Elaine Stott
- No. of episodes: 14

Release
- Original network: CBS
- Original release: September 25 – December 18, 2019

Additional information
- Filming dates: March 21 – April 28, 2019

Season chronology
- ← Previous; Edge of Extinction Next → Winners at War

Survivor: Island of the Idols is the 39th season of the American competitive reality television series Survivor. Hosted by Jeff Probst, it featured two tribes of ten new contestants. The season was filmed in Fiji during April and May 2019, and aired on CBS in the United States from September 25, 2019, until December 18, 2019, when Tommy Sheehan was named the winner by an 8–2–0 vote over Dean Kowalski and Noura Salman.

== Format ==
Survivor is a reality television show based on the Swedish show Expedition Robinson, created by Mark Burnett and Charlie Parsons. The series follows a number of participants isolated in a remote location, where they must provide food, fire, and shelter. One by one, a participant is removed from the series by majority vote, with challenges held to give a reward (ranging from living- and food-related prizes to a car) and immunity from being voted out of the series. The last remaining player receives a prize of $1,000,000.

== Contestants ==
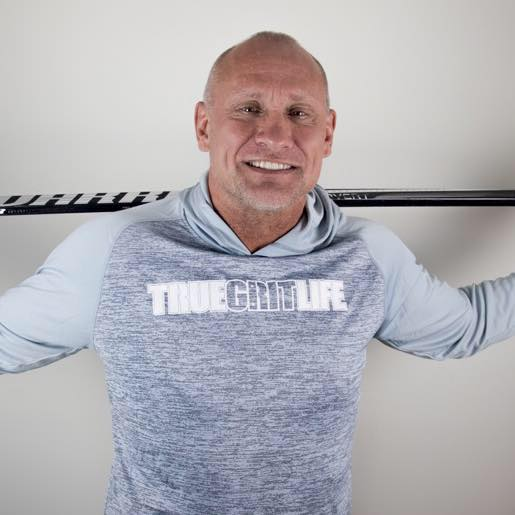
Tom Laidlaw

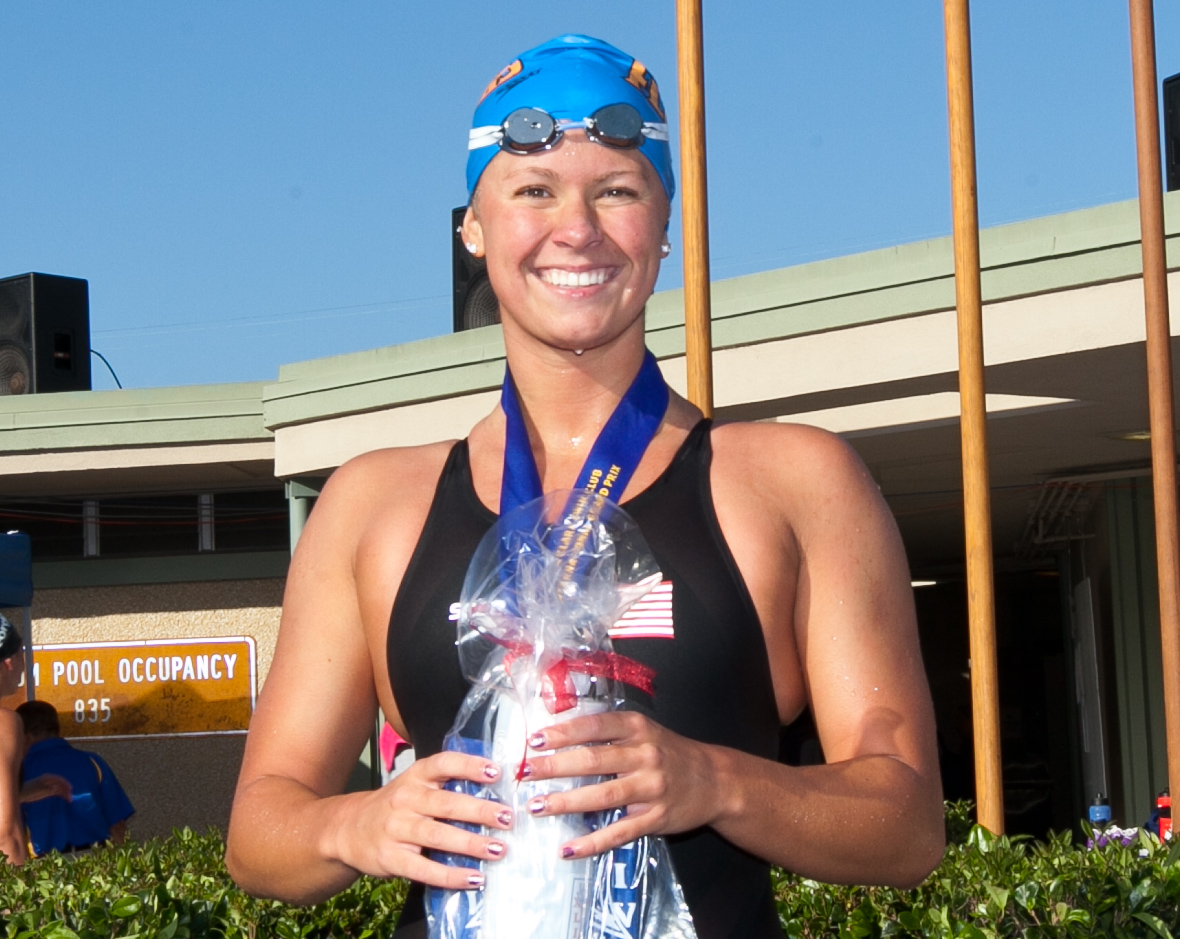
Elizabeth Beisel

Notable contestants from this season include retired National Hockey League defenseman Tom Laidlaw, Olympic swimmer Elizabeth Beisel, and professional poker player Ronnie Bardah.

List of Survivor: Island of the Idols contestants
Contestant	Age	From	Tribe			Finish	
Contestant	Age	From	Original	Switched	Merged	Placement	Day
Ronnie Bardah	36	Henderson, Nevada	Lairo			1st voted out	Day 3
Molly Byman	27	Durham, North Carolina	Vokai			2nd voted out	Day 6
Vince Moua	27	Merced, California	Lairo			3rd voted out	Day 8
Chelsea Walker	27	Los Angeles, California	Lairo			4th voted out	Day 11
Tom Laidlaw	60	Brampton, Ontario	Lairo	Lairo		5th voted out	Day 14
Jason Linden	32	New York, New York	Vokai	Vokai		6th voted out	Day 16
Jack Nichting	23	Harrisonburg, Virginia	Vokai	Lairo		7th voted out 1st jury member	Day 19
Kellee Kim	29	Philadelphia, Pennsylvania	Vokai	Lairo	Lumuwaku	8th voted out 2nd jury member	Day 22
Jamal Shipman	33	Providence, Rhode Island	Vokai	Lairo	Lumuwaku	9th voted out 3rd jury member	Day 24
Aaron Meredith	36	Warwick, Rhode Island	Lairo	Vokai	Lumuwaku	10th voted out 4th jury member	Day 27
Missy Byrd	24	Tacoma, Washington	Lairo	Vokai	Lumuwaku	11th voted out 5th jury member	Day 27
Elizabeth Beisel	26	Saunderstown, Rhode Island	Lairo	Vokai	Lumuwaku	12th voted out 6th jury member	Day 30
Karishma Patel	37	Houston, Texas	Lairo	Lairo	Lumuwaku	13th voted out 7th jury member	Day 32
Elaine Stott	41	Rockholds, Kentucky	Lairo	Vokai	Lumuwaku	14th voted out 8th jury member	Day 35
Dan Spilo	48	Los Angeles, California	Vokai	Vokai	Lumuwaku	Ejected	Day 36
Janet Carbin	59	Palm Bay, Florida	Vokai	Lairo	Lumuwaku	15th voted out 9th jury member	Day 37
Lauren Beck	28	Glendale, California	Vokai	Vokai	Lumuwaku	Eliminated; 10th jury member	Day 38
Noura Salman	36	North Potomac, Maryland	Vokai	Lairo	Lumuwaku	2nd runner-up	Day 39
Dean Kowalski	29	New York, New York	Lairo	Lairo	Lumuwaku	Runner-up	Day 39
Tommy Sheehan	26	Long Beach, New York	Vokai	Vokai	Lumuwaku	Sole Survivor	Day 39

=== Future appearances ===
Tommy Sheehan competed on the thirty-seventh season of the MTV reality competition show The Challenge. Chelsea Walker competed on the revival of Legends of the Hidden Temple. In 2023, Missy Byrd competed on The CW and Roku Channel show Fight to Survive.

== Season summary ==
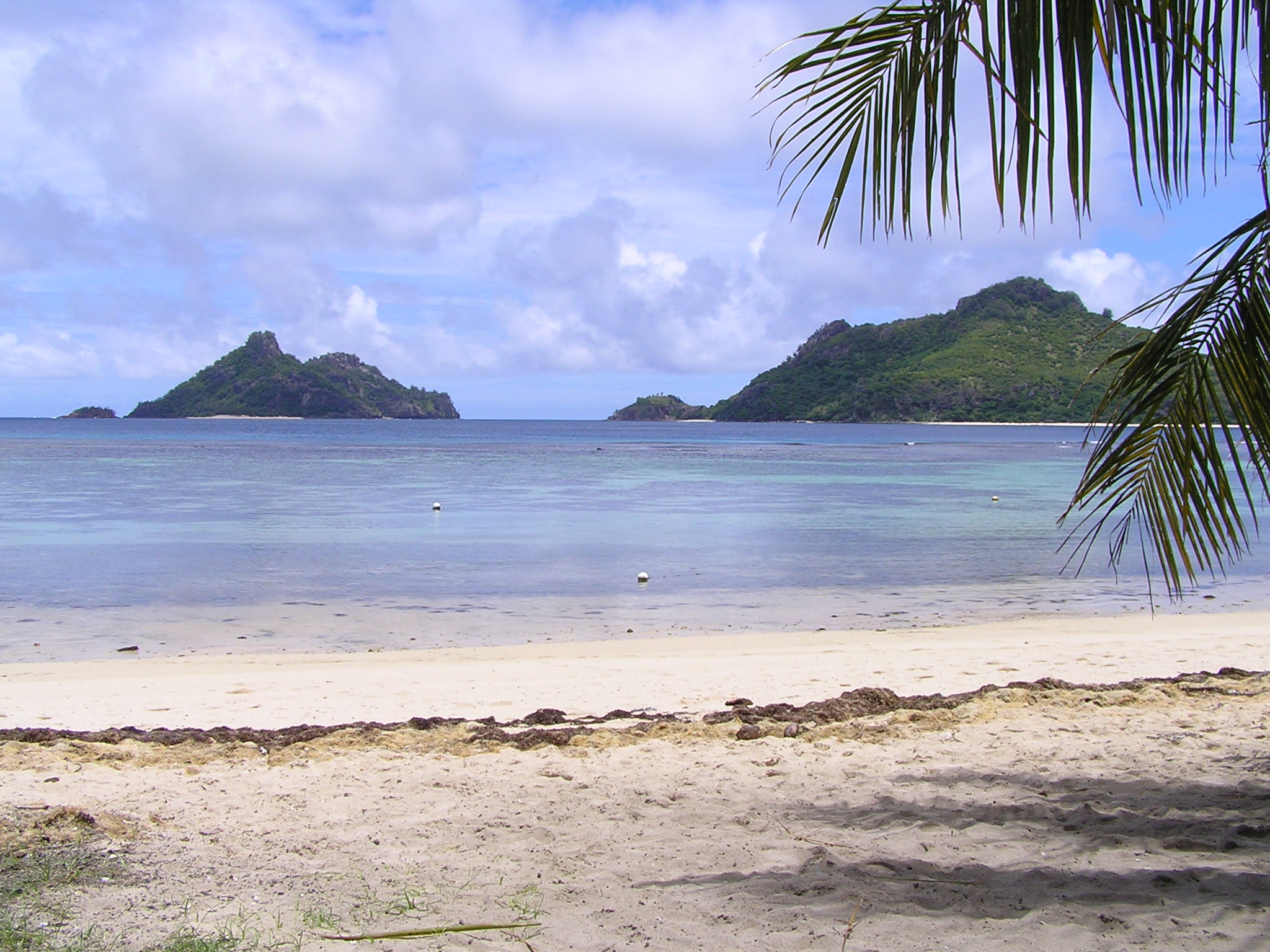
The season filmed in the Mamanuca Islands of Fiji.

The 20 new castaways were randomly divided into two tribes of ten (Lairo and Vokai). Vokai won nearly every challenge, even after a tribe swap. Missy controlled much of the strategy on Lairo, while Vokai was run by Lauren and Tommy. At the swap, Lairo outsider Karishma flipped on her old tribe, while new bonds were formed on both tribes, causing some of the players to forgo their old alliances.

At the merge, Dan had been accused of inappropriate touching by several women on the tribe. In the midst of this, Lauren and Tommy used their social bonds to ultimately dismantle the Lairo alliance until only Dean remained. After Dan's ejection for an unspecified incident with a crewmember, Dean kept himself in the game by winning immunity challenges while Elaine and Janet were eliminated as they were considered too likeable to take to the end.

The Final Four were Dean, Lauren, Noura, and Tommy; Noura won the final challenge, and Tommy convinced her to take him to the end. Dean joined them in the Final Three after defeating Lauren in the fire-making challenge. The jury ultimately rewarded Tommy's strong social game by voting him the Sole Survivor.

Challenge winners and eliminations by episode
Episode			Challenge winner(s)		Island of the Idols		Eliminated	
No.	Title	Original air date	Reward	Immunity	Player	Result	Tribe	Player
1	"I Vote You Out and That's It"	September 25, 2019	Vokai		Elizabeth (Lairo)	Lost	Lairo	Ronnie
2	"YOLO, Let's Play!"	October 2, 2019	Lairo		Kellee (Vokai)	Won	Vokai	Molly
3	"Honesty Would Be Chill"	October 9, 2019	Vokai		Vince (Lairo)	Won	Lairo	Vince
4	"Plan Z"	October 16, 2019	Vokai		Noura (Vokai)	Lost	Lairo	Chelsea
5	"Don't Bite the Hand That Feeds You"	October 23, 2019	Vokai	Vokai	None (Note: There was no Island of the Idols due to the tribe switch.)		Lairo	Tom
6	"Suck It Up Buttercup"	October 30, 2019	Vokai	Lairo	Elaine (Vokai)	Won	Vokai	Jason
7	"I Was Born at Night, But Not Last Night"	November 6, 2019	Vokai (Note: There was an unaired reward challenge in this episode.)	Vokai	Janet (Lairo)	Declined	Lairo	Jack
8	"We Made It to the Merge!"	November 13, 2019	None (Note: There was no reward challenge or Island of the Idols due to the merge.)	Aaron	None		Lumuwaku	Kellee
8	"We Made It to the Merge!"	November 13, 2019	Dan, Dean, Elaine, Elizabeth, Noura, Tommy	Aaron	Jamal	Lost (Note: There was no challenge; the note that invited Jamal to the Island of the Idols simply said that he would lose his vote at the next Tribal Council.)	Lumuwaku	Jamal
8	"We Made It to the Merge!"	November 13, 2019	Dan, Dean, Elaine, Elizabeth, Noura, Tommy	Missy	Jamal	Lost	Lumuwaku	Jamal
9	"Two for the Price of One"	November 20, 2019	Elaine [Elizabeth, Karishma, Missy, Tommy] (Note: In addition to immunity, Elaine won reward for her entire "orange" tribe for lasting the longest in the challenge.)	Noura	None (Note: No one was sent to the Island of the Idols due to the double Tribal Council.)		Lumuwaku	Aaron
9	"Two for the Price of One"	November 20, 2019	Elaine [Elizabeth, Karishma, Missy, Tommy]	Elaine	None		Lumuwaku	Missy
10	"Bring on the Bacon"	November 27, 2019	None	Noura	Lauren	Won	Lumuwaku	Elizabeth
11	"A Very Simple Plan"	December 4, 2019	Janet, Tommy [Dan, Lauren]	Lauren	None		Lumuwaku	Karishma
12	"Just Go For It"	December 11, 2019	Tommy [Dean, Noura]	Dean	Dean	Won	Lumuwaku	Elaine
12	"Just Go For It"	December 11, 2019	None				Lumuwaku	Dan
13	"Mama, Look at Me Now"	December 18, 2019	Dean [Noura]	Dean	Dean, Janet, Lauren, Noura, Tommy (Note: On Day 36, the remaining players were sent to the Island of the Idols for the remainder of the game and given a final lesson. Dean found the final advantage.)	Dean	Lumuwaku	Janet
13	"Mama, Look at Me Now"	December 18, 2019	None	Noura (Note: For winning the final Immunity Challenge, Noura had to assign additional immunity to another castaway, with the remaining two competing in a fire-making challenge to determine the third finalist; she gave additional immunity to Tommy.) [Tommy]	None		Lumuwaku	Lauren
14	"Reunion Special"	December 18, 2019						

== Episodes ==
No. overall	No. in season	Title	Rating/share (18-49)	Weekly rank	Original release date	U.S. viewers (millions)
569	1	"I Vote You Out and That's It"	1.3/6	18	September 25, 2019	6.29
The two tribes, Lairo and Vokai, were dropped off at their camps with no introduction by Jeff, and several members wondered about the "Island of the Idols" theme. At Lairo, Tom bonded with Elaine and Vince, and the other seven members agreed to align against them. Missy felt more secure in aligning with the women, so she told Elaine her name had been mentioned for elimination. Elaine's sense of humor caught the attention of her tribemates, especially Ronnie; he proceeded to propose an alliance with her (masking his true intention of voting her out first), but she distrusted him. At Vokai, Janet led the tribe in making fire without flint. Jason quickly began searching for an idol, but Molly and Dan noted his absence from camp and targeted him. Jack bonded with Tommy, who subsequently bonded with several of his other tribemates. Kellee and Molly were put off by Dan's "touchy" behavior, voicing their concerns to Janet. Dan and Kellee later smoothed things over, though Kellee was still wary of Dan.: Reward/Immunity Challenge: Tribe members climbed over a net and slid down a slide. One tribe member then used a grappling hook to lower a bridge. On the other side, the tribemates formed a human ladder for one person to drop two ropes, so that the rest of the tribe could meet them on top of the tower. There, three tribe members had to solve a village puzzle. The first tribe to assemble their puzzle correctly won immunity and flint.; Vokai ran away with the victory during the puzzle portion of the challenge. Jeff had a Lairo member randomly draw the name of a tribemate to be sent to the Island of the Idols; Elaine drew Elizabeth's name. Jeff also said Elizabeth would return in time for Tribal Council that night. At the Island of the Idols, an excited Elizabeth was greeted by Boston Rob and Sandra, who taught her how to make fire. Elizabeth made fire after struggling, then accepted an offer to take on Rob in a fire-making challenge for an idol good at the next two Tribal Councils. Elizabeth lost the duel and therefore, her vote as well. Before she left, Rob and Sandra told her to randomly draw a Vokai member's name (which remained unrevealed) to be the next visitor to the Island of the Idols. Back at camp, Chelsea conferred with Elaine, Tom, and Vince, who targeted Ronnie. Elaine was targeted by some of the other tribe members, but after pledging her loyalty to them, Aaron targeted Vince instead. Elizabeth returned to camp and withheld the information about Rob and Sandra, as well as the fact that she lost her vote. At Tribal Council, Rob and Sandra watched the proceedings from a concealed alcove; Elaine continued to plead her case, while Ronnie made a case for tribe strength. Ultimately, Ronnie was blindsided by the rest of his tribe, sans Aaron and Elizabeth (the latter of whom cast no vote), becoming the first person eliminated from the game.
570	2	"YOLO, Let's Play!"	1.2/6	22	October 2, 2019	6.57
The aftermath of Lairo's first Tribal Council was tense, with Vince questioning why he received votes and Aaron expressing frustration about being left out of the loop. Missy reassured him that he would be safe, but Aaron was skeptical. The following day, Chelsea stumbled upon an idol while gathering firewood. At Vokai, Noura's quirky behavior was a concern to her tribemates, while Jack, Jamal, and Molly were tightly aligned. A boat came in to pick up Kellee for Island of the Idols, as her name had been drawn by Elizabeth previously. Upon arriving, Kellee was greeted by Rob and Sandra, who told her more about themselves and said that her test would determine how well she paid attention socially. Rob offered Kellee an idol good for two Tribal Councils if she could correctly answer 4 of 5 questions; her hesitance made Rob offer the idol for 3 councils if she could get 3 of 5 right. Kellee ultimately won the challenge, but at camp, she also kept Rob and Sandra a secret in favor of a lie about a choice between urns.: Reward/Immunity Challenge: The teams swam to the ocean floor to release a ladder. They had to use it for a respective teammate to climb up and unhook a bag containing three balls. Once ashore, the tribe used the ladder as a bridge to a table, where one member had to land all 3 balls into targets. The first tribe to do so won immunity and spices.; Lairo won the challenge. The vote initially was a toss-up between Jason and Noura; Molly wanted Noura gone first, but Jamal saw Jason as a more dangerous player. Lauren saw an opportunity to target Molly for her perceived social prowess, roping in several tribe members, though Tommy was reluctant to make waves at the tribe's first vote. At Tribal Council, Jason and Noura both pled for their tribemates to spare them. Ultimately, Lauren’s plan came to fruition and Molly was voted out, leaving Jamal and Jack shocked.
571	3	"Honesty Would Be Chill"	1.2/6	23	October 9, 2019	6.51
Now in the minority of Vokai, Jack tried to reintegrate with his tribemates, while Jamal attempted to shift the target off himself by targeting Dan, though Janet grew wary of Jamal's scrambling. At Lairo, the men were wary of a women's alliance and attempted to align with Vince, who secretly wasn't on board. Karishma, who wasn't as keen on the women's alliance, accidentally cut her hand with the machete and felt alienated from the tribe afterwards. A boat came to pick up Vince for Island of the Idols, and after Vince left, Dean openly suggested splitting the vote in case Vince were to find an idol, which made Karishma paranoid. At the Island of the Idols, Rob and Sandra tested Vince's ability to remain calm under pressure by challenging him to sneak into Vokai's camp after dark to light a torch from their fire without being caught. Vince accepted the challenge, but due to rain which had put out Vokai's fire, resorted to taking ash from the fire pit instead, which satisfied Rob and Sandra. Vince was given an immunity idol good for his next two Tribal Councils.: Reward/Immunity Challenge: One member from each tribe swam to a net to retrieve a key. This allowed their tribemates to meet them at a teeter-totter. Once up there, the tribes maintained their balance on the teeter while two members grabbed a bag of puzzle pieces on each side. They then used the key to unlock the remaining puzzle pieces inside a crate. The first tribe to solve the resulting fish puzzle won immunity plus comfort items and a tarp.; Vokai overtook Lairo in the puzzle to win the challenge. The women debated voting out Vince or Tom (due to wanting to keep Aaron and Dean around for challenges), while Vince told a paranoid Karishma to vote against Tom. At Tribal Council, Karishma whispered to some of her tribemates but was called out by Tom. Vince brought his idol but didn't play it, and the women stuck together to send him out of the game.
572	4	"Plan Z"	1.4/7	17	October 16, 2019	6.91
After narrowly surviving the vote, Karishma was still uneasy about her position in the tribe, while Aaron and Missy were concerned about a potential power couple in Dean and Chelsea. At Vokai, Jamal searched for an idol while his tribemates were occupied, which he eventually found. Unlike the previous visits to Island of the Idols, Vokai had to come to a unanimous agreement on whom to send, or else the tribe would randomly draw a name. Noura eventually volunteered; upon arriving, Rob and Sandra gave her a chance to prove her powers of persuasion by explaining the next immunity challenge would have one tribe member call out directions to others who would all be blindfolded; their challenge to Noura was to persuade her tribe to make her the caller. If successful, she would gain an advantage to block a tribemate from voting, or otherwise would lose her vote. She agreed instantly, but upon returning to camp, her disjointed explanations of why she should be the caller created distrust among the tribe.: Reward/Immunity Challenge: One castaway from each tribe was their caller, directing their blindfolded tribemates to collect keys by pulling down a bucket of water. Once all three keys have been collected, the caller brought their tribe to a puzzle; they directed one blindfolded tribemate to solve the puzzle. The first to do so for their tribe won immunity plus an assortment of baked goods and caffeinated accessories (the reward component was not shown in the episode).; Vokai had Noura sit out. Lairo nearly came from way behind, but a mistake in the puzzle proved costly, and Vokai won the challenge. Aaron tried to convince his tribemates to vote out Dean to break up the "power couple", but several others wanted to vote out Karishma. Missy sensed that some of them were scared to turn on Dean so quickly, so she proposed voting out Chelsea instead. At Tribal Council, Missy's plan worked; Chelsea didn't play her idol and was blindsided with it in her pocket.
573	5	"Don't Bite the Hand That Feeds You"	1.3/6	21	October 23, 2019	6.82
Dean questioned his tribemates over Chelsea's blindside, eventually deducing it was Missy who orchestrated the vote. Upon arriving at a challenge site, the tribes were randomly reshuffled; the new Lairo tribe consisted of Dean, Jack, Jamal, Janet, Karishma, Kellee, Noura, and Tom, while the new Vokai tribe consisted of Aaron, Dan, Elaine, Elizabeth, Jason, Lauren, Missy, and Tommy.: Reward Challenge: Tribemates' arms and legs were bound together as they made their way over a sand hump. Over the hump were two more tribemates to repeat the process on two occasions. Once all three pairs finished the course, the last two tribemates completed a vertical fire puzzle. The first tribe to finish their puzzle won an Applebee's feast.; Vokai continued their challenge dominance even with new members. At Lairo, Dean and Tom respectively bonded with Kellee and Janet, while Karishma eagerly pled her loyalty to the five Vokai members. At Vokai, Elaine and Missy fake-fought to entertain their new tribemates, while Aaron bonded with Tommy in hopes that it would break the 4-4 stalemate in the tribe.: Immunity Challenge: Castaways swam out to a giant ladder jutting out over the water, climbed it, leapt into the water, and dove down to retrieve buoys. They used the buoys to score three baskets. The first team to score three baskets won immunity.; Vokai won immunity again. Dean and Tom were willing to cut Karishma due to her weakness in challenges, while Vokai debated voting out a threat in Dean or Tom, or preserving tribe strength with them. Noura had lost her vote from her unsuccessful test at Island of the Idols, but Vokai still had a 4-3 majority in the tribe. At Tribal Council, Dean was left out of another vote as Tom was sent out of the game.
574	6	"Suck It Up Buttercup"	1.2/6	21	October 30, 2019	6.37
Despite being in a 5-2 majority, Noura approached Dean about turning against Jack and Jamal, but Dean was wary of her eagerness to flip. At Vokai, Aaron told Jason he was ready to jump ship to avoid going to rocks.: Reward Challenge: Six members of each tribe pulled a sled with sandbags and one person on top. Once they are through the course, have collected a key, and unlocked a slingshot, the rider used it to knock down three targets. The first tribe to knock down all three targets won chickens.; Elaine was picked to sit out for Vokai, meaning she would also be sent to the Island of the Idols. Vokai won the challenge. At the Island, Elaine accepted Rob and Sandra's challenge before even hearing what it was. The two instructed her that she had to retrieve a vote-blocking advantage that was hidden at one of the stations at the upcoming immunity challenge without being caught; being caught or not retrieving the advantage would cause her to forfeit her vote at the next Tribal Council. At Lairo, Jack offhandedly mentioned the word "du-rag" in Jamal's presence, but immediately realized the ramifications of what he said. Jack offered an apology, which Jamal accepted.: Immunity Challenge: Tribes dug under a cage, then transported it while attempting to gather five balls. Upon finishing the course, they threw the balls into five targets. The first tribe to score all five won immunity.; Elaine was able to snatch the advantage, and Lairo came from behind to win immunity. Elaine told Elizabeth, Aaron, and Missy about her advantage, but Aaron internally debated whether to flip. At Tribal Council, Elaine revealed her advantage, leading to whispering amongst the Lairo and Vokai alliances. Ultimately, Elaine blocked Jason's vote, and Aaron stayed loyal to his original tribe, sending Jason home.
575	7	"I Was Born at Night, But Not Last Night"	1.3/6	TBA	November 6, 2019	6.82
Lauren felt betrayed by Missy, to whom she felt close, after her alliance's successful blindside of Jason. At Lairo, Noura tried to organize a girls' alliance against Jamal. Janet was selected for Island of the Idols; Rob and Sandra's challenge to her was to play a game to test her ability of calculated risk. If she won, she would receive an advantage where she could forgo any single Tribal Council up until the final seven (in which case she would be immune); if she lost the game, she would lose her vote. Janet decided not to play due to concern over being a future target because of the advantage. Back at Vokai, Tommy and Lauren tried to turn the Lairo members against Dan, but Missy saw through their scheme.: Immunity Challenge: Tribe members tossed coconuts into a basket to ultimately make a tower of puzzle pieces to collapse. They used those heavy pieces to solve a puzzle that reveals the season's logo. The first tribe to correctly assemble the puzzle won immunity.; Vokai edged out Lairo as both tribes were placing the final piece of the puzzle. The Vokai majority plus Karishma agreed to vote out Dean, but Kellee got an idea to turn against Jamal or Jack using her idol. As that night was the last opportunity to play it, she discreetly gave the idol to Dean. At Tribal Council, Jamal voiced concerns of a potential girls' alliance, but Kellee took the comment as being sexist, leading to a healthy discussion about respect for women. When the time came to vote, Kellee voted against Dean to cover herself; Dean played the idol to negate 5 votes, but this prompted Jamal to play his idol on Noura. Jamal's idol went to waste, while Noura joined Dean in voting out Jack, who became the first member of the jury. The episode concluded with a tribute to two-time contestant Rudy Boesch, who died the weekend prior to the episode's release.
576	8	"We Made It to the Merge!"	1.1/6	TBA	November 13, 2019	6.07
Kellee located a hidden immunity idol on the Lairo beach, prior to both tribes receiving notice about the merge into Lumuwaku. At the celebratory merge banquet, Kellee met with Missy for the first time, discovering both had issues with how Dan behaved around them. This led to a long discourse between the merged tribe over Kellee's accusations against Dan, requiring production to speak with the contestants as a whole and individually, warning Dan about his behavior. In the meantime, Tommy talked to Janet and Kellee about aligning with Aaron, Missy, Elizabeth, and Elaine, but Kellee was skeptical because she felt those were the four most dangerous players in the game. Despite this, Kellee had bonded with Missy on the beach, to Tommy and Lauren's concern. Kellee decided not to vote out Dan for his behavior and put her feelings aside to target Missy. However, Lauren told Missy about the plan, causing Missy to believe Kellee was lying about Dan. Missy instructed Elizabeth to lie to Janet about Dan.: Immunity Challenge: Each contestant had to hold up a board with three balls placed in holes along it. The board was held over spokes that would poke the balls out of the holes if lowered too far, and also had a latching mechanism to prevent the board from being raised. The last player with any balls remaining on their board won.; Aaron won the challenge, with Kellee targeting Missy as the biggest remaining threat, but decided to target Dan instead after Jamal and Janet agreed to. Kellee felt uneasy about Dan's calm demeanor before Tribal and searched for a merged tribe idol, which she found. At Tribal, the situation around Dan was discussed. Kellee opted not to play either idol, and while Dan received five votes, Missy's turn led to Kellee's elimination. After Kellee's blindside, Dan quickly tried to learn why he was targeted by Missy, Elizabeth and Janet. Both Missy and Elizabeth admitted that they did not actually have any issues with him. Janet also apologized to her ally Dan, explaining that he had been targeted based on his reputation. Missy and Elizabeth gaslit Janet after everyone assumed the incident was made up by Kellee and Janet. The following morning, Janet found a new immunity idol. Near camp, Jamal saw a note and took it, finding that it would send him to the Island of the Idols. There, Rob and Sandra explained that by grabbing the note, he already lost his vote for the next Tribal Council, but gave him the opportunity to sabotage another player, giving him blank paper and pencil to write anything he wanted. He used the blank paper to create a fake Legacy Advantage, claiming that it could be played when there are 9 or 6 castaways remaining. Back at camp, Jamal claimed that he had found a special advantage that he had to write down and give another player, giving this to Dean. However, this painted more of a target on Jamal, as Dean and the rest of the tribe weren't convinced of Jamal's story.: Immunity Challenge: Each contestant held a rope tether behind their backs while hanging over water, and had to stay in that position as long as possible. Periodically, the amount of rope was lengthened, making it more difficult to hold their position. Immunity was given to the last man and woman standing.; Aaron and Missy won immunity. Jamal, at the bottom of his alliance and without a vote, scrambled for some support before Tribal, while Janet became concerned she would be targeted. At Tribal, the situation from Dan and Kellee came up again, leading to a long discussion on appropriate behaviors. Janet even considered quitting due to Elizabeth and Missy's playing on Kellee's accusations against Dan, but was talked out of it. After the vote, Janet played the idol, but it was unnecessary as the tribe had sent Jamal to the jury with six votes to Janet's two and Karishma's three.
577	9	"Two for the Price of One"	1.2/6	TBA	November 20, 2019	6.63
Karishma continued to struggle with the elements and at camp, but she discovered an idol. She lied about feeling ill to her tribemates, since they had her gather coconuts and she only had collected two in an hour.: Reward/Immunity Challenge: The tribe was randomly divided into two groups: Aaron, Dan, Dean, Janet, Lauren, and Noura made up the purple group, while Elaine, Elizabeth, Karishma, Missy, and Tommy made up the orange group. Each castaway balanced on a beam while spinning a ball around a frame using centrifugal force. The last castaway left standing from each group won immunity, but the last one left standing overall won peanut butter & jelly sandwiches for their group, as well as the right for their group to visit Tribal Council last to view the results from the first one.; Noura won immunity on purple but immediately dropped out afterward in her elation, leading to orange winning reward; Elaine also won immunity. Several of the purple team members agreed to vote out Janet, but Aaron's name was also brought up due to his status as a physical threat. Dean was reluctant to expose himself as a physical threat by voting out Aaron, but at Tribal Council, he joined the rest of the group in sending Aaron to the jury. Meanwhile on orange, Karishma and Missy clashed when the former felt bullied as they tried to talk strategy. Missy targeted Tommy due to his strategic and personal bond with Lauren, but Elaine came up with a plan to target Missy. At orange's Tribal Council, Karishma and Missy's conflict was brought up. Ultimately, Karishma joined Elaine and Tommy in blindsiding Missy from the game.
578	10	"Bring on the Bacon"	1.1/6	TBA	November 27, 2019	6.48
Dean grew concerned of a "goat" alliance banding together to take out threats, and he attempted to align with Tommy and Elizabeth. He also wrote his own fake legacy advantage to give his tribemates the perception that he'd get rid of the potentially real one Jamal gave him earlier. The tribe had to unanimously select a person for Island of the Idols or go to random draw; Lauren immediately volunteered, which upset Karishma, as she wanted to go. On the Island, Lauren's test was to predict the winner of the upcoming immunity challenge; Rob and Sandra told her about the challenge, which gave castaways the option to sit out and eat. Rob eventually offered to have Lauren pick two potential winners, and she chose Noura and Elizabeth. Lauren then told her tribemates about the challenge, attempting to get only Noura and Elizabeth to compete.: Immunity Challenge: Castaways held a metal bar to keep an overhead ball in place. If the ball dropped, that castaway was eliminated. The last one standing won immunity, but castaways could give up their shot at immunity for a breakfast feast.; Elizabeth, Karishma, and Noura competed, with Noura outlasting Elizabeth for her second consecutive immunity win. Lauren received an idol good for the next two Tribal Councils for her correct prediction. The tribe considered voting out a threat in Elizabeth or an easy target in Karishma. Karishma attempted to rally Elizabeth to take out Dan, but Lauren overheard their conversation and foiled Karishma’s plan. This made Dan want to switch the target from Elizabeth to Karishma, which he expressed to his alliance. At Tribal Council, Dean played the fake legacy advantage he wrote, and Karishma played her idol. This prompted Lauren to play her idol, but no votes were cast against her. Seven votes against Karishma were negated, and a 1-1 tie between Elizabeth and Janet led to Elizabeth being unanimously sent to the jury on the revote.
579	11	"A Very Simple Plan"	1.2/6	TBA	December 4, 2019	6.86
On day 31, the castaways were met by their loved ones: Lauren's husband Matt, Tommy's girlfriend Nicole, Karishma's husband Drew, Noura's sister Lana, Janet's husband John, Dean's mother Lori, Dan's 13-year old son Ryan, and Elaine's girlfriend Tonya.: Reward Challenge: Randomly divided into pairs, castaways completed an obstacle course from the water to the sand to ultimately toss a bag onto a small stand. The first pair to do this won time with their loved ones.; Janet and Tommy won reward; they selected Dan and Lauren, as well as their loved ones, to join them on reward. Those four players aligned and agreed to target Elaine first, while the four left at camp (Dean, Elaine, Karishma, and Noura) aligned as well, with Noura going on a tirade about not being chosen for the reward. The latter group targeted Lauren as the biggest social threat and searched for a new idol, which Elaine found in front of them.: Immunity Challenge: Castaways stood on a small block while stabilizing a ball against an overhanging piece of wood. If at any point they lost their concentration or balance, their ball dropped, eliminating them. The last person left standing won immunity.; Lauren outlasted Elaine for immunity. Though Karishma was again targeted as an easy vote, a split-vote proposal opened the door for the four left out of the reward to orchestrate a blindside against Tommy, upon Elaine's suggestion. Noura's paranoia that Tommy may also have an idol made Dean uneasy about working with her, and at Tribal Council, he ultimately whispered to Tommy that Elaine, Noura, and Karishma had targeted him. This led to open whispering that culminated in Noura loudly revealing the alliance's plans, not to trust Dean, and that Elaine found an idol. Lauren grew frustrated that Noura had not told her alliance of this information before tribal, which prompted her, Dan, Janet, and Tommy to consider voting Noura out. With her idol exposed, Elaine was forced to play it, but the tribe had agreed to their initial plan of sending Karishma to the jury, with Noura receiving three votes after her outburst.
580	12	"Just Go For It"	1.2/7	TBA	December 11, 2019	6.82
As retaliation against Dean for leaking the previous tribal's plan to Tommy, Noura hid Dean's shoes. The next morning, Janet, Tommy, Dean, and Elaine searched for a new idol, which Janet found and showed to Tommy. Dean saw them looking down at something and correctly surmised they had it. Elaine told Lauren that Tommy, Dan, and Dean could potentially be plotting a guys' alliance, and Tommy was indeed wary of Lauren's status as a social threat and sought to align with Dan and Dean. The next person for Island of the Idols was to be selected by random draw; Janet drew Dean's name. When he arrived, he was offered a coin flip for one of three advantages of his choice: an idol nullifier, an extra vote, or an idol good for the next Tribal Council that couldn't be played for himself. Dean won and chose the idol nullifier. At camp, Dean told everyone he lost his vote, but privately told Tommy the truth, which concerned Tommy about Dean's surging gameplay.: Immunity Challenge: Castaways spun themselves to unspool rope from around their waist, then had to cross a balance beam while dizzy. On the beam is a puzzle piece; once through the course, castaways had to solve a word puzzle. The first to do so won immunity.; Dean barely beat out Elaine for immunity. Elaine was nervous about being voted out and pitched her case to Lauren, while the majority targeted Elaine with Dan voting Noura as a backup in case any idols or advantages were played. At Tribal Council, an emotional Elaine opened up about her experience and was consoled by her tribemates. Though she again pled her case to stay, saying she would be a bigger target than other threats like Lauren and Janet, Elaine was sent to the jury. The following morning, Jeff arrived at camp and informed the remaining castaways that Dan had been removed from the game after an undisclosed incident and would not serve on the jury.
581	13	"Mama, Look at Me Now"	1.2/6	TBA	December 18, 2019	6.52
The final five were instructed to pack their belongings and get on a boat for Island of the Idols. Rob and Sandra told them that would be their home for the rest of the game, but they had one last test for the players not disclosed to them. Tommy caught on and asked Dean for assistance due to being color-blind, but Dean followed the clues for himself and located an idol. During this, Dean and Tommy made a Final Two deal.: Reward/Immunity Challenge: Castaways used a long stick to dislodge ropes that would be used as steps on a ladder. Once up the ladder, castaways had to navigate two balls through a table maze. The first to land both balls won immunity and a feast of steak, baked potatoes, and vegetables.; Dean won immunity and chose to share his reward with Noura, as a gesture of putting their differences aside. They made a final 2 deal, but unbeknownst to Noura, Dean had one with Tommy as well. Janet was targeted, but she tried to convince Tommy to turn on Lauren due to her strong social gameplay. Dean contemplated whether to play his idol nullifier, debating whether Lauren or Janet was a bigger threat for his game. At Tribal Council, Janet played her idol and Dean played his nullifier, and Janet was unanimously sent to the jury. Tommy took Noura aside and tried to convince her that his firemaking skills were limited, in case Noura were to win final immunity; in reality, Tommy felt confident in his firemaking ability.: Immunity Challenge: Castaways had to balance a stand while placing letters to spell out “Island of the Idols” without any typos or backwards letters. The first castaway to lock their stand in place with all letters correctly placed won immunity and the right to take one other castaway to the end with them.; Dean maintained a slight lead over Noura throughout the challenge, but dropped nearly every block late in the challenge. Noura held on to win her third immunity necklace. She began a long explanation of who she would take to the end with her, ultimately choosing Tommy; Lauren was offended that Noura said she was her “number 1” but was forcing her to make fire, leading to an argument during which Noura threatened to hide the machete. At Tribal Council, Noura indeed took Tommy to the end, citing that she needed someone to beat Lauren at fire.: Fire Making Challenge: Dean was the first to get a flame and slowly nurtured it as he built his fire with kindling. Lauren soon followed suit but Dean did a better job of building a base. Dean won the fire making challenge making Lauren the final jury member.; At the Final Tribal Council, Tommy’s social game was praised, but he was questioned over the big moves he had made as opposed to Dean, who was praised for his immunity wins and finding advantages late in the game. However, Dean was called out by Tommy and Noura for riding coattails for much of the game and questioned over saying the line he wouldn’t cross was making final 2 deals (though he had done so numerous times). Noura wasn’t taken as seriously by the jury due to her perceived erratic and emotion-based gameplay.
582	14	"Reunion Special"	0.9/5	TBA	December 18, 2019	4.61
Several months later, Tommy was named the Sole Survivor in an 8–2–0 vote over Dean and Noura, respectively, and won the US$1 million prize. Probst later announced that Sia, a singer and fan of Survivor, had given Jamal Shipman $15,000 and Elaine Stott and Janet Carbin $100,000 each.

== Voting history ==
	Original tribes				Switched tribes			Merged tribe										
Episode	1	2	3	4	5	6	7	8		9		10		11	12		13	
Day	3	6	8	11	14	16	19	22	24	27 (Note: On Day 27, a split Tribal Council was held. The castaways were divided into two groups; each group went to Tribal Council separately to eliminate one castaway from each.)		30		32	35	36	37	38
Tribe	Lairo	Vokai	Lairo	Lairo	Lairo	Vokai	Lairo	Lumuwaku	Lumuwaku	Lumuwaku	Lumuwaku	Lumuwaku		Lumuwaku	Lumuwaku	Lumuwaku	Lumuwaku	Lumuwaku
Eliminated	Ronnie	Molly	Vince	Chelsea	Tom	Jason	Jack	Kellee	Jamal	Aaron	Missy	Tie (Note: The vote resulted in a tie. Per the rules, a second vote was held where the castaways involved in the tie would not vote and the remaining castaways could only vote for those who tied.)	Elizabeth	Karishma	Elaine	Dan	Janet	Lauren
Votes	7–2	7–2–1	5–3–1	6–2	5–2	4–3	2–0 (Note: Dean played a hidden immunity idol on himself, therefore five votes against him were not counted.)	8–5	6–3–0 (Note: Janet played a hidden immunity idol on herself, therefore two votes against her were not counted.)	5–1	3–2	1–1–0 (Note: Karishma played a hidden immunity idol on herself, therefore seven votes against her were not counted.)	7–0	5–3	5–2	Ejected (Note: No vote; Dan was ejected from the game and did not join the jury.)	4–1 (Note: Janet played a hidden immunity idol on herself, but Dean played an idol nullifier on her, therefore the effects of her idol were negated and the 4 votes against her were still counted.)	None (Note: For winning the final Immunity Challenge, Noura had to assign additional immunity to another castaway, with the remaining two competing in a fire-making challenge to determine the third finalist; she gave additional immunity to Tommy, and Dean defeated Lauren in the fire-making challenge)
Voter	Vote																	Challenge
Tommy		Molly				Elaine		Kellee	Jamal		Missy	~~Karishma~~	Elizabeth	Karishma	Elaine		Janet	Saved
Dean	Ronnie		Karishma	Karishma	Karishma		Jack	Kellee	Jamal	Aaron		~~Karishma~~	Elizabeth	Karishma	Elaine		Janet	Won
Noura		Molly			None (Note: This player lost a vote attempting to gain an advantage.)		Jack	Dan	Jamal	Aaron		~~Karishma~~	Elizabeth	Karishma	Elaine		Janet	Immune
Lauren		Molly				Elaine		Kellee	Karishma	Aaron		~~Karishma~~	Elizabeth	Karishma	Elaine		Janet	Lost
Janet		Molly			Tom		~~Dean~~	Dan	Jamal	Aaron		~~Karishma~~	None (Note: This player was not eligible to vote in the second round of voting.)	Noura	Elaine		Lauren	
Dan		Molly				Elaine		Kellee	Jamal	Aaron		Elizabeth	Elizabeth	Noura	Noura	Ejected		
Elaine	Ronnie		Vince	Chelsea		Jason		Kellee	Karishma		Missy	~~Karishma~~	Elizabeth	Karishma	Noura			
Karishma	Ronnie		Vince	Chelsea	Tom		~~Dean~~	Dan	~~Janet~~		Missy	Janet	Elizabeth	Noura				
Elizabeth	None		Vince	Chelsea		Jason		Kellee	Karishma		Tommy	~~Karishma~~	None					
Missy	Ronnie		Vince	Chelsea		Jason		Kellee	~~Janet~~		Tommy							
Aaron	Vince		Karishma	Chelsea		Jason		Kellee	Jamal	Janet								
Jamal		Jason			Tom		~~Dean~~	Dan	None									
Kellee		Molly			Tom		~~Dean~~	Dan										
Jack		Jason			Tom		~~Dean~~											
Jason		Molly				None (Note: This player lost their vote as another player used a block a vote advantage.)												
Tom	Ronnie		Karishma	Chelsea	Karishma													
Chelsea	Ronnie		Vince	Karishma														
Vince	Ronnie		Tom															
Molly		Noura																
Ronnie	Vince																	

Jury vote
Episode	14		
Day	39		
Finalist	Tommy	Dean	Noura
Votes	8–2–0		
Juror	Vote		
Lauren	Yes		
Janet	Yes		
Elaine	Yes		
Karishma	Yes		
Elizabeth		Yes	
Missy	Yes		
Aaron		Yes	
Jamal	Yes		
Kellee	Yes		
Jack	Yes		

== Production ==
=== Filming ===
This season introduced the eponymous Island of the Idols, as Survivor alumni Sandra Diaz-Twine, winner of Survivor: Pearl Islands and Survivor: Heroes vs. Villains, and Rob Mariano, winner of Survivor: Redemption Island, returned to the game as mentors living on the Island of the Idols, though they did not compete for the million-dollar prize themselves. Instead, Diaz-Twine and Mariano periodically hosted a contestant each episode and gave them a lesson to assist them in the game. They also gave the contestant a chance to win an advantage, but if they failed, they lost their vote at their next Tribal Council.

The season received widespread media attention after contestant Dan Spilo was accused of inappropriately touching female contestants. While there was no in-game recourse provided from the production crew, Spilo was later ejected from the game following an off-camera incident involving a crew member. CBS and Survivor producers issued an apology for how they handled the situation and announced they would make significant changes to their safety protocols, to be fully in place by the 41st season, filming of which took place two years later following Island of the Idols' airing.

This season featured the Island of the Idols, a secluded location inhabited by Survivor winners Sandra Diaz-Twine and Rob Mariano, acting as non-competing advisers. Castaways were periodically exiled to the island throughout the season, where Diaz-Twine and Mariano taught them a lesson about a specific skill designed to help them in the game, such as fire-making or active listening, and then offered them an optional challenge to test that skill. Winning the challenge would yield a reward such as a hidden immunity idol or vote blocker, while losing the challenge meant losing the right to vote at the next Tribal Council attended by the losing castaway (though this was not revealed to the other players; a castaway without a vote would still go to the voting area during Tribal Council, but would write "no vote" on the parchment). Diaz-Twine and Mariano were not eligible to compete or win the grand prize, nor could they vote at Tribal Council. Unbeknownst to the castaways, the mentors secretly attended each Tribal Council in a hideaway, allowing them to eavesdrop on the proceedings.

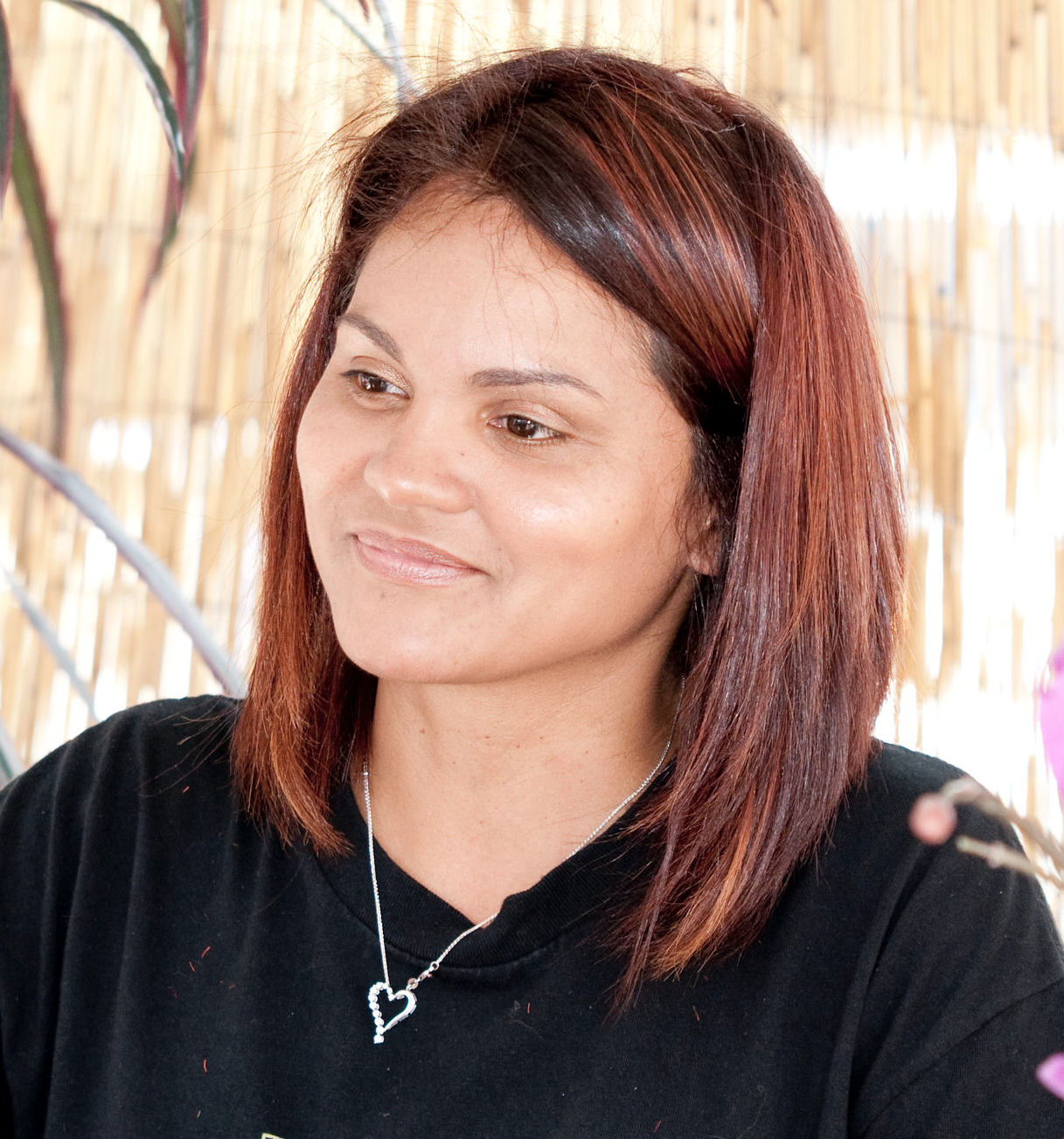
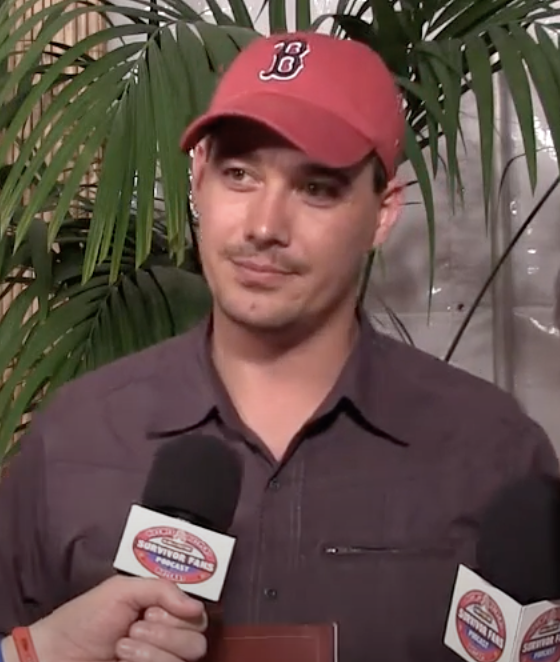
Mentors Sandra Diaz-Twine and Rob Mariano

According to host and executive producer Jeff Probst, the idea to bring back past champions as mentors came from "wondering how to get a player like Boston Rob, who has said he'd never compete again because he doesn't feel he'd ever really have a shot to win, to return to the show." Probst considered the mentors to be equivalent of on-camera producers for this season. Mariano and Diaz-Twine were even involved with the pre-production phase, posing for 3D modeling of their heads for the statues, and providing input on the type of lessons they would be able to teach, as well as how they would present these lessons. The two also had flexibility as to how significant each advantage would be, such as making an advantage be valid for a time ranging from one to three Tribal Councils. According to Diaz-Twine, Probst compared their mentor roles similarly to the single-episode cameo by Survivor: Caramoan winner John Cochran during Survivor: Game Changers, where he had provided strategic advice to a player as part of a reward. Diaz-Twine and Mariano later returned to compete on the subsequent season, Survivor: Winners at War, which began filming in Fiji weeks after Island of the Idols production concluded, though this had not yet been confirmed when they were cast for this season.

Probst said that production wanted players to try to figure out with as little information that they were told: that the title of the season was "Island of the Idols" and had hoped players would question if the separate island would be filled with immunity idols. They were not sure how players who were taken to the Island would behave on their return whether they would tell the truth or lie about what happened on the island, and were surprised that all players fibbed and did not discuss Rob or Sandra's presence there.

Island of the Idols became the first season to feature a Canadian-born castaway (Tom Laidlaw), as the casting process opened for Canadian residents in mid-2018. Previously, Canadian citizens had been ineligible to compete on the show as, according to Probst, the limitation was due to the rights that Mark Burnett and CBS had on the Survivor format, limiting it to contestants with American citizenship. While Survivor has had contestants with dual citizenship in the past, such as Survivor: China winner Todd Herzog, they were required to give up their non-American citizenship as a prerequisite for claiming their prize money.

== Contestant misconduct controversy ==
From the first episode up until the merge in the eighth episode, Kellee Kim and several other members of the Vokai tribe had expressed concerns to Dan Spilo about him repeatedly touching them without asking. At the merge, Kim had her first opportunity to speak to Missy Byrd, who also stated her concerns on Spilo's behavior. Kim spoke of her concerns to the merged tribe, at which point production became much more involved. One Survivor producer explained to Kim that she should let them know if Spilo continued to cross the line, and if she did, then production would immediately take action. Production contacted CBS about the situation, who instructed them to have group and individual meetings with the remaining castaways and formally warned Spilo about his behavior. Title cards were used in-episode to explain the situation to viewers.

Contestants may be disqualified and ejected from the Series Location in the sole discretion of Producer, including, without limitation, for any of the following reasons (as determined by Producer in its sole discretion): ... In the case of misconduct or unlawful conduct (as determined by Producer in its sole discretion), including but not limited to stealing, or misappropriating food, harming, or threatening harm to, other Contestants or crew members, acts of violence, or criminal damage.

— CBS's rules of Survivor

Though not in her best game interests at the time, Kim and her ally Janet Carbin ultimately agreed to vote out Spilo at the first merge Tribal Council, believing to have support from the other women on the tribe, including Byrd and Elizabeth Beisel, who had both expressed discomfort towards his actions. However, Kim saw herself being voted out of the game after a majority of the tribe believed her to be a bigger in-game threat than Spilo was. Issues on Spilo's behavior persisted in the tribe through the next few days, as both Beisel and Byrd admitted that they did not have any issues with him, and had simply decided to play on Kim's concerns in an attempt to gain her trust. At the next Tribal Council, the impact of Spilo's behavior had come up, and Spilo took time to apologize to Kim and the other female tribe members for any wrongdoing, even bringing up the impact of the Me Too movement during his speech. The day after the episode aired, several contestants posted public apologies to Kim and Carbin for their behavior—seeing the problems with it after watching the episode—and for not seeing how much the situation affected the two women.

Probst claimed that he and production talked to Kim about letting her have a chance to respond to Spilo, but she agreed with production that as a jury member she would remain quiet as per the game's rules. Kim would later contradict this statement, claiming that she did not speak with Probst at all until after that particular Tribal Council. For the remainder of the season, production continued to monitor the situation, with the staff performing individual interviews with players keeping abreast of any concerns or issues related to the situation and reminding contestants to report anything they feel uncomfortable about to production immediately. At the end of Episode 12, on the morning of Day 36, Probst came to camp and announced to the remaining castaways that Spilo had been removed from the game, and would not be allowed to serve on the jury. A title card revealed that Spilo was ejected because of an off-camera incident that "did not involve a player". In an interview, Probst declined to elaborate on what happened, citing "privacy and confidentiality" concerns. This is the first time a contestant had to be ejected from the show by production.

Many fans argued that Spilo should have been ejected from the game when Kim's concerns were first raised instead of creating a storyline out of it for the show. CBS and MGM issued a joint statement reiterating that production had been monitoring the situation around the clock, as part of the standard practice for the show, and would have taken action if they felt Kim or any other player was at risk. "On Survivor, producers provide the castaways a wide berth to play the game. At the same time, all castaways are monitored and supervised at all times. They have full access to producers and doctors, and the production will intervene in situations where warranted." Other fans were upset at Beisel and Byrd for invalidating Spilo's misconduct and using the situation to leverage their games.

For the first time in the show's history, the finale and reunion shows were pre-taped, rather than aired live. The show went "live-to-tape" four hours earlier than usual to screen for potentially sensitive material relating to the allegations against Spilo and his subsequent ejection. Spilo was uninvited from the reunion following his ejection, while Biesel and Jack Nichting also did not show up to the finale. The reunion included a one-on-one interview between Probst and Kim to address the allegations and the way they were handled, and resulted in Probst apologizing to Kim on behalf of the production team.

CBS and Survivor issued a second statement on December 18, 2019, prior to the finale to readdress the protocol for future seasons. Due to these events, castaways in Season 40 (which was filmed immediately after this season was) were given additional pre-production guidelines on "personal space, inappropriate behavior, and how to report these issues". Future seasons will see this orientation expanded to include the means to which castaways can report their concerns of other players in a confidential manner to production, and production will improve their staff's training to watch for these issues ahead of time, and to add a support system for affected castaways as part of their available on-island and post-elimination mental health support. Further, new rules will disallow "unwelcome physical contact, sexual harassment and impermissible biases" to be brought into the game, or they may lead to a castaway's dismissal from the game. Additionally, during the reunion, Probst apologized directly to Kim on behalf of the show and CBS for mistakes that were made, and then gave Kim several minutes to express her concerns and additional thoughts from the incident. Kim stated that the hardest part of the situation was not what Spilo did, but that she felt that she was "not supported or believed" by production, which Probst said was a misstep on their part. In response to these announced changes, Kim said "This has been a hard season, but I’m proud that the change I fought for is happening. I’ve been inspired & overwhelmed by the people who have reached out to support me & share their stories."

Spilo spoke to People after the conclusion of the season, saying "I am deeply sorry for how my actions affected Kellee during the taping of this season of Survivor ... After apologizing at the Tribal Council when I first learned that Kellee still felt uncomfortable, I want to make sure I do so again, clearly and unambiguously."

== Reception ==
Survivor: Island of the Idols was initially praised for the diverse cast and its gameplay prior to the merge episode. However, the controversy regarding Dan Spilo was met with universal disdain and intense scrutiny, resulting in the season being heavily panned by critics. Additional criticism was pointed at the following post-merge episodes, the edit portraying a very predictable winner, as well as the idol nullifier twist (obtained via a random coin flip) controversially ousting crowd-favorite Janet Carbin at the final five.

Andy Dehnart of Reality Blurred labeled the season as the worst ever while pointing out several systemic problems with the show as a whole. He noted that the past five seasons were all won by men, while the past four seasons had featured only one female finalist who did not receive a single vote at the Final Tribal Council. He stated, "in the last five seasons, there have been fifty-two jury votes cast, and fifty of those have gone to men." He also lambasted the show for not having a proper protocol in dealing with sexual harassment until the "inappropriate touching" controversy essentially forced CBS to develop a formal one.

Daniel Fienberg of The Hollywood Reporter wrote that the inaction from producers had not only ruined the season but tainted the legacy and future of Survivor. He stated, "Somewhere, somebody needs to feel shame — not embarrassment, but shame — at what happened this season and owing to potential legal ramifications, I doubt we'll see any regret or remorse at all. I'm not accusing anybody of a crime. All I'm saying is: Kellee deserved better. The women of Survivor deserved better. The fans of Survivor deserved better. I don't know how anybody is supposed to trust the show to do right by its contestants again. You broke it, Survivor gang. I don't know how you're going to fix it."

Caroline Framke of Variety stated that the way that CBS handled the controversy was "irresponsible and infuriating." Specifically, she talked about the merge episode, which highlighted the Dan Spilo controversy, and the ninth episode, which aired one week after the merge episode and did not discuss the controversy at all. She stated, "It's downright insulting, and a baffling display of the show's inability to grasp the gravity of what happened on its watch."

James Poniewozik of The New York Times talked about the ending to the twelfth episode when Dan was ejected from the game. He stated, "Wednesday's episode abruptly ended with the cryptic announcement that a contestant, Dan Spilo, had been ejected from the show after an 'incident.' But regular viewers knew that this was just another twist in a story that had tarnished the season." He goes on to explain how CBS "failed its #MeToo test," accusing the network of not listening to Kellee Kim's complaints and concerns the first time she spoke about them.

Dalton Ross of Entertainment Weekly, ranking the Survivor seasons through the 40th installment, placed Island of the Idols at the bottom of the list. He called the season "impossible to enjoy" due to Spilo's actions, and stated that "even though there were several things and people worth celebrating at various points in the show's 39th installment, the end result is that this felt like the least entertaining outing in the franchise’s history."

Survivor fan site "The Purple Rock Podcast" ranked Island of the Idols 39th out of 40 seasons in 2020, stating that the "pre-merge portion of the game is enjoyable" but the season's "potential is completely squandered by the actions (and inaction) of the show's production team."

Inside Survivor ranked this season 38th out of 40 saying that the bright spots are few and far between after the events of the merge and that the rewatch value is extremely low.

Rob Has a Podcast ranked Island of the Idols 40th during their Survivor All-Time Top 40 Rankings podcast.

In 2024, Nick Caruso of TVLine ranked this season 46th out of 47.

== Viewing figures ==
=== United States ===
Viewership and ratings per episode of Survivor: Island of the Idols
No.	Title	Air date	Rating/share (18–49)	Viewers (millions)	DVR (18–49)	DVR viewers (millions)	Total (18–49)	Total viewers (millions)	Ref.
1	"I Vote You Out and That's It"	September 25, 2019	1.3/6	6.29	0.70	2.53	1.97	8.83	
2	"YOLO, Let's Play!"	October 2, 2019	1.2/6	6.57	0.58	2.11	1.76	8.69	
3	"Honesty Would Be Chill"	October 9, 2019	1.2/6	6.51	0.62	2.20	1.78	8.72	
4	"Plan Z"	October 16, 2019	1.4/7	6.91	0.63	2.13	2.02	9.06	
5	"Don't Bite the Hand That Feeds You"	October 23, 2019	1.3/6	6.82	0.62	2.17	1.90	9.00	
6	"Suck It Up Buttercup"	October 30, 2019	1.2/6	6.37	0.62	2.31	1.80	8.69	
7	"I Was Born at Night, But Not Last Night"	November 6, 2019	1.3/6	6.82	0.64	2.32	1.92	9.16	
8	"We Made It to the Merge!"	November 13, 2019	1.1/6	6.07	0.60	2.36	1.75	8.45	
9	"Two for the Price of One"	November 20, 2019	1.2/6	6.63	0.59	2.08	1.81	8.73	
10	"Bring on the Bacon"	November 27, 2019	1.1/6	6.48	0.66	2.35	1.77	8.84	
11	"A Very Simple Plan"	December 4, 2019	1.2/6	6.86	0.52	1.92	1.74	8.79	
12	"Just Go For It"	December 11, 2019	1.2/7	6.82	0.51	1.98	1.75	8.82	
13	"Mama, Look at Me Now"	December 18, 2019	1.2/6	6.52	0.54	1.99	1.77	8.53	
14	"Reunion Special"	December 18, 2019	0.9/5	4.61	0.55	2.08	1.41	6.70	

=== Canada ===
No.	Air date	Total viewers (millions)	Rank (week)	Refs
1	September 25, 2019	2.18	3	
2	October 2, 2019	1.80	7	
3	October 9, 2019	1.78	4	
4	October 16, 2019	1.89	4	
5	October 23, 2019	1.81	4	
6	October 30, 2019	2.13	1	
7	November 6, 2019	1.92	4	
8	November 13, 2019	1.99	3	
9	November 20, 2019	1.92	4	
10	November 27, 2019	2.02	2	
11	December 4, 2019	1.86	4	
12	December 11, 2019	1.98	1	
13	December 18, 2019	1.82	3	
14	December 18, 2019	1.82	3	
