= Tom Laidlaw =

Canadian ice hockey player

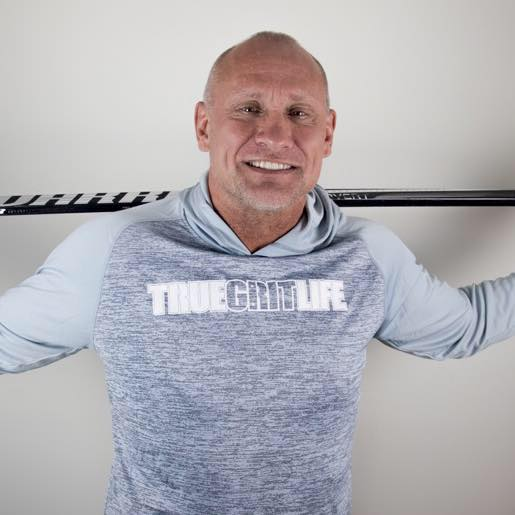
- Laidlaw in 2019
- Born: April 15, 1958 (age 68) Brampton, Ontario, Canada
- Height: 6 ft 2 in (188 cm)
- Weight: 215 lb (98 kg; 15 st 5 lb)
- Position: Defence
- Shot: Left
- Played for: New York Rangers; Los Angeles Kings
- NHL draft: 93rd overall, 1978; New York Rangers
- Playing career: 1979–1991

Thomas John Laidlaw (born April 15, 1958) is a Canadian retired ice hockey defenceman.

Laidlaw started his National Hockey League (NHL) career with the New York Rangers in 1980, arriving from Northern Michigan University. He also played for the Los Angeles Kings. He left the NHL after the 1990 season. He played one season for the Phoenix Roadrunners of the IHL before retiring from hockey. Afterward, he became the colour commentator on Kings' radio broadcasts. He currently runs a sports management company in Rye Brook, New York. Laidlaw is also a motivational speaker and frequently uses his mantra of living a "True Grit Life". Laidlaw promotes the "True Grit Life" through public speaking engagements and weekly podcast episodes.

In 2019, Laidlaw competed on Survivor: Island of the Idols, the 39th season of the American reality TV franchise Survivor. He was the first Canadian-born person to be a contestant on the show. He was voted out on Day 14, finishing in 16th place.

In the 2009 book 100 Ranger Greats, the authors ranked Laidlaw at No. 87 all-time of the 901 New York Rangers who had played during the team's first 82 seasons.

== Career statistics ==
=== Regular season and playoffs ===
			Regular season					Playoffs
Season	Team	League	GP	G	A	Pts	PIM	GP	G	A	Pts	PIM
1973–74	Bramalea Blues	MetJHL	—	—	—	—	—	—	—	—	—	—
1974–75	Bramalea Blues	MetJHL	—	—	—	—	—	—	—	—	—	—
1975–76	Bramalea Blues	MetJHL	—	—	—	—	—	—	—	—	—	—
1976–77	Northern Michigan University	CCHA	32	1	13	14	95	—	—	—	—	—
1977–78	Northern Michigan University	CCHA	24	1	7	8	95	—	—	—	—	—
1978–79	Northern Michigan University	CCHA	29	10	20	30	137	—	—	—	—	—
1979–80	Northern Michigan University	CCHA	39	8	30	38	83	—	—	—	—	—
1979–80	New Haven Nighthawks	AHL	1	0	0	0	0	10	1	6	7	27
1980–81	New York Rangers	NHL	80	6	23	29	100	14	1	4	5	18
1981–82	New York Rangers	NHL	79	3	18	21	104	10	0	3	3	14
1982–83	New York Rangers	NHL	80	0	10	10	75	9	1	1	2	10
1983–84	New York Rangers	NHL	79	3	15	18	62	5	0	0	0	8
1984–85	New York Rangers	NHL	61	1	11	12	52	3	0	2	2	4
1985–86	New York Rangers	NHL	68	6	12	18	103	7	0	2	2	12
1986–87	New York Rangers	NHL	63	1	10	11	65	—	—	—	—	—
1986–87	Los Angeles Kings	NHL	11	0	3	3	4	5	0	0	0	2
1987–88	Los Angeles Kings	NHL	57	1	12	13	47	5	0	2	2	4
1988–89	Los Angeles Kings	NHL	70	3	17	20	63	11	2	3	5	6
1989–90	Los Angeles Kings	NHL	57	1	8	9	42	—	—	—	—	—
1990–91	Phoenix Roadrunners	IHL	4	0	1	1	2	—	—	—	—	—
NHL totals			705	25	139	164	717	69	4	17	21	78

== Awards and honours ==
Chinguacousy Township Section 'A' Novice Champions [Bramalea Merchants]	1967–68
All-CCHA First Team	1978–79; 1979–80
All-NCAA All-Tournament Team	1980

== Survivor ==
Laidlaw was one of 20 castaways to compete on Survivor: Island of the Idols, the 39th season of the American reality competition show. At the start of the game, he was placed on the Lairo tribe, where he formed a bond with fellow tribemates Elaine Stott and Vince Moua. On Day Eight, Moua was voted out by the majority, despite Laidlaw's attempts to get tribemate Karishma Patel out of the game. On Day 12, Laidlaw and Stott were split up by the tribal swap; she was sent to Vokai while he remained on Lairo, where he was joined by five original Vokai members. On Day 14, Laidlaw again tried to get his tribe to vote out Patel, but the new members of the tribe, wary of Laidlaw's connections to his old tribemates, decided to vote him out instead.
