= Fight to Survive (TV series) =

American reality competition show

- Genre: Reality competition
- Presented by: Akbar Gbaja-Biamila
- Country of origin: United States
- Original language: English
- No. of seasons: 1
- No. of episodes: 8

Production
- Executive producer: Kevin Lee
- Production company: Tollbooth Television

Original release
- Network: The CW; The Roku Channel
- Release: August 10 – September 28, 2023

Fight to Survive is an American reality competition television series that premiered on the American television network: The CW on August 10, 2023. The series is hosted by Akbar Gbaja-Biamila. The series received negative reviews from critics.

== Format ==
The competition introduces 17 contestants competing for 25 days on Taveuni Island in Fiji. Many of these participants appeared on other survival competitions.

At the start, four key resource zones are established which are water, food, shelter, and firewood. In the beginning, each contestant is given a specific tool, such as a fire starter or a fishing spear.

=== Arena battles ===
The owner of the resource or tool, however can be challenged by someone, through banging a drum at a specified location. The challenger will then compete against the holder of the resource or tool in an arena at night. If the challenger wins, the owner will give up the tool or resource. Otherwise, the challenger will be banished from the game.

=== Rules in elimination ===
There are no vote-offs. The only way to be eliminated from the contest is by being banished (through losing an Arena battle), to voluntary tap out, or to be medically evacuated.

=== Prize structure ===
At the end of the 25 days, if multiple contestants remain, they will split the $100,000. However, if only one contestants remain, that person wins the $250,000 on its entirety.

== Production ==
On December 8, 2021, it was announced that The Roku Channel had ordered the series. On July 13, 2023, it was announced that the series would move to The CW and premiere on August 10, 2023. All eight episodes have been made available to stream on The Roku Channel as of September 29, 2023. The contestants were also announced.

== Contestants ==
Competitor	Age	Hometown	Notability (known for)	Day exited	Status	Ref.
J Ruiz	37	Tampa, Florida	American Ninja Warrior Seasons 6, 7 and 8 Steve Austin's Broken Skull Challenge	25	Won (8)	
Missy Byrd	27	Denver, Colorado	Survivor: Island of the Idols	24	Eliminated (8)	
Amal Alyassiri	38	Cedar Rapids, Iowa	Naked and Afraid Season 9	22	Eliminated (8)	
Sarah Danser	31	Honolulu, Hawaii	Naked and Afraid Season 8 Naked and Afraid: Lost at Sea; Naked and Afraid XL Season 4 Naked and Ghosted Season 11	20	Eliminated (8)	
Makani Nalu	27	Venice, California	Stranded with a Million Dollars; Naked and Afraid Season 10; Naked and Afraid XL Season 6	19	Eliminated (7)	
Stephanie Gonzalez	31	Ocala, Florida	Survivor: Ghost Island	19	Voluntarily Withdrawn (7)	
Keali'i "K" Ka'apana	41	Orange County, California	Called to the Wild	19	Voluntarily Withdrawn (7)	
Nathaniel Allenby	38	San Diego, California	Survival Enthusiast	18	Voluntarily Withdrawn (7)	
Libby Vincek	29	Orange Beach, Alabama	Survivor: Ghost Island	17	Voluntarily Withdrawn (7)	
Christina McQueen	45	Borden, Indiana	Naked and Afraid Season 4 Naked and Afraid XL Season 5	16	Medically Withdrawn (6)	
Jonathan Monroe	31	Panama City, Florida	Naked and Afraid Season 7 Are You the One? Season 8	14	Voluntarily Withdrawn (5)	
Robby Canton	25	Colorado Springs, Colorado	Survivalist	10	Voluntarily Withdrawn (4)	
Zane Kraetsch	33	Pagosa Springs, Colorado	Alone: The Beast	10	Eliminated (4)	
Yuda Abitbol	30	Oahu, Hawaii	YouTube/TikTok/Survivalist Chef Influencer	6	Eliminated (3)	
Afften DeShazer	35	Chicago, Illinois	Naked and Afraid Season 4	6	Voluntarily Withdrawn (2)	
Dani Beau	33	Mercer, Maine	Naked and Afraid Season 4 & 14; Naked and Afraid XL Season 1	2	Medically Withdrawn (1)	
Matthew Clarke	31	Yukon, Canada	YouTube Survivalist Influencer	2	Medically Withdrawn (1)	

== Elimination table ==
Results
Contestant	Episodes							
Contestant	1	2	3	4	5	6	7	8
J Ruiz	WIN	WIN	WIN	WIN	SAFE	WIN	SAFE	WINNER
Missy Byrd	WIN	WIN	SAFE	WIN	SAFE	WIN	SAFE	OUT
Amal Alyassiri	SAFE	WIN	SAFE	SAFE	SAFE	SAFE	SAFE	OUT
Sarah Danser	SAFE	SAFE	SAFE	SAFE	SAFE	SAFE	WIN	OUT
Makani Nalu	SAFE	SAFE	SAFE	SAFE	SAFE	SAFE	OUT	
Stephanie Gonzalez	SAFE	SAFE	SAFE	SAFE	LOSS	SAFE	VOL	
Keali'i "K" Ka'apana	LOSS	SAFE	SAFE	SAFE	SAFE	LOSS	VOL	
Nathaniel Allenby	SAFE	SAFE	SAFE	SAFE	SAFE	LOSS	VOL	
Libby Vincek	SAFE	SAFE	SAFE	SAFE	WIN	SAFE	VOL	
Christina McQueen	LOSS	LOSS	SAFE	LOSS	SAFE	MED		
Jonathan Monroe	SAFE	SAFE	SAFE	LOSS	VOL			
Robby Canton	SAFE	SAFE	SAFE	VOL				
Zane Kraetsch	SAFE	LOSS	SAFE	OUT				
Yuda Abitbol	SAFE	SAFE	OUT					
Afften DeShazer	SAFE	VOL						
Dani Beau	MED							
Matthew Clarke	MED							

- The contestant voluntarily withdrew from the competition
- The contestant medically withdrew from the competition
- The contestant won the challenge
- The contestant lost the challenge
- The contestant lost the challenge and was eliminated from the competition
- The contestant won Fight to Survive

== Episodes ==
No.	Title	Day(s)	Original release date	Prod. code	U.S. viewers (millions)	Rating (18-49)
1	"Survival of the Fittest"	Days 1–3	August 10, 2023	101	0.353	0.06
Challengers: Missy & J vs. Keali'i & Christina
2	"The Storm"	Days 3–6	August 17, 2023	102	0.262	0.04
Challengers: Amal & J vs. Zane & Christina, Missy vs. Afften
3	"This is War"	Days 6–8	August 24, 2023	103	0.307	0.05
Challengers: Yuda vs. J
4	"Dog Fight"	Days 8–10	August 31, 2023	104	0.217	0.01
Challengers: Missy & J vs. Jonathan & Sarah, Zane vs J
5	"The Hunt"	Days 11–14	September 7, 2023	105	0.242	0.04
Challengers: Libby vs. Stephanie
6	"The Breaking Point"	Days 14–16	September 14, 2023	106	0.274	0.04
Challengers: J vs. Nathaniel, Missy vs. Christina (Draw), Missy vs. Keali'i (Keali'i forfeited)
7	"The Final Countdown"	Days 17–19	September 21, 2023	107	0.223	0.02
Challengers: J vs. Nathaniel (Nathaniel forfeited), Sarah vs. Makani
8	"Battleground"	Days 20–25	September 28, 2023	108	0.213	0.05
Challengers: Amal vs. Sarah, J & Missy vs. Amal & Zane, Missy & Zane vs. J & Amal

== Reception ==
Critics panned the show, criticizing the show's antisocial tone and lack of originality. Writing for Common Sense Media, Melissa Camacho said that the show's violence is "shrouded in clichéd rituals to exoticize the experience, but it's not enough to hide the fact that it's showcasing a mild version of the worst of humanity for the purpose of entertainment". Writing for Reality Blurred, Andy Denhart criticized the show for being unengaging due to a lack of character development, and that its repeated recourse to violence was "a little one-note". Joel Keller, a writer for Decider.com, said that "despite not being all that different than most survival reality series, there's a nastiness to Fight To Survive that's off-putting. It's not like other series of this type don't have contestants forming alliances and being cutthroat, but for some reason or another, this show wants to show everyone's cutthroat tendencies off the bat rather than show actual survival skills."
