= Yul Kwon =

American television personality (born 1975)

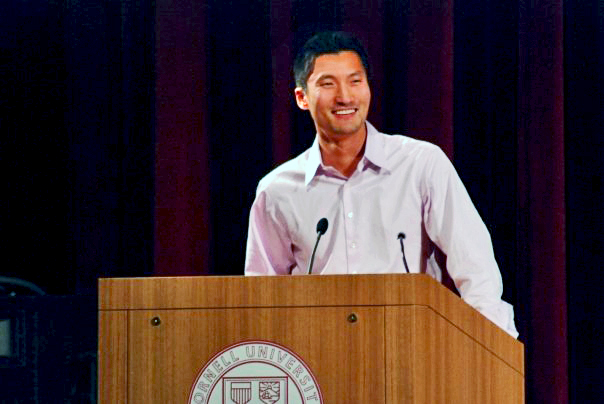
- Yul Kwon, delivering a speech at Cornell University, December 20, 2009
- Born: Yul Julius Kwon; February 14, 1975 (age 51); Flushing, Queens, New York, U.S.
- Education: Stanford University (B.S., 1997); Yale Law School (J.D., 2000)
- Occupations: Television host, law, and management consultant
- Television: Survivor: Cook Islands (winner); Survivor: Winners at War
- Spouse: Sophie Tan (2009-)
- Children: 2

Yul Julius Kwon (born February 14, 1975) is an American television host and former government official, lawyer, and management consultant based in California. He first gained national recognition and popularity as the winner of the reality TV show Survivor: Cook Islands in 2006. He appeared again in Survivor: Winners at War, where he placed 14th. Kwon hosted the 2012 four-part TV series America Revealed on PBS as well as LinkAsia on Link TV.

== Early life and education ==
Kwon was born in Flushing in the Queens borough of New York City, to South Korean immigrants. He moved to Concord, California and attended Northgate High School, in Walnut Creek, where he graduated valedictorian and played varsity water polo and track and field.

Kwon attended college at Stanford University, graduating in 1997 with a B.S. degree in Symbolic Systems and is a brother of Lambda Phi Epsilon fraternity. As a student, he earned recognition for both academic achievement (Phi Beta Kappa) and community service (James Lyons Award).

In his sophomore year, Kwon's childhood friend and roommate, Evan Chen, was diagnosed with a terminal case of leukemia. Kwon organized an intense nationwide bone marrow campaign in an effort to find a bone marrow donor for his friend. Although the search was successful and Chen underwent a marrow transplant, the procedure ultimately failed and Chen died two years later. He continues to organize bone marrow drives and serves as a national spokesperson for the Asian American Donor Program.

After graduation from Stanford, Kwon attended Yale Law School, where he earned a J.D. in 2000 and was an editor on The Yale Law Journal.

== Career ==
Kwon's professional career spanned a variety of roles across technology, law, business, and government. He worked at two law firms - Venture Law Group and Harris, Wiltshire & Grannis. He served a judicial clerkship with Judge Barrington D. Parker, Jr. on the Second Circuit Court of Appeals. He also worked as a legislative aide to U.S. Senator Joseph Lieberman in Washington, D.C.

In 2009, Kwon was appointed Deputy Chief of the Consumer and Governmental Affairs Bureau for the Federal Communications Commission (FCC). In 2011, Kwon left the FCC and became the host of a new television series on PBS, America Revealed. He became the host of a weekly news show, LinkAsia, which airs on LinkTV.

Kwon's private sector business experience includes working in Google's business strategy group and as a management consultant with McKinsey & Company and The Trium Group. In February 2013, Kwon joined Facebook's Privacy product team, and in 2015, he moved into the position of Product Management Director. In June 2018, he left Facebook and is currently working at Google as a Vice President of Product Management.

Kwon became a lecturer for the Federal Bureau of Investigation.

== Survivor ==
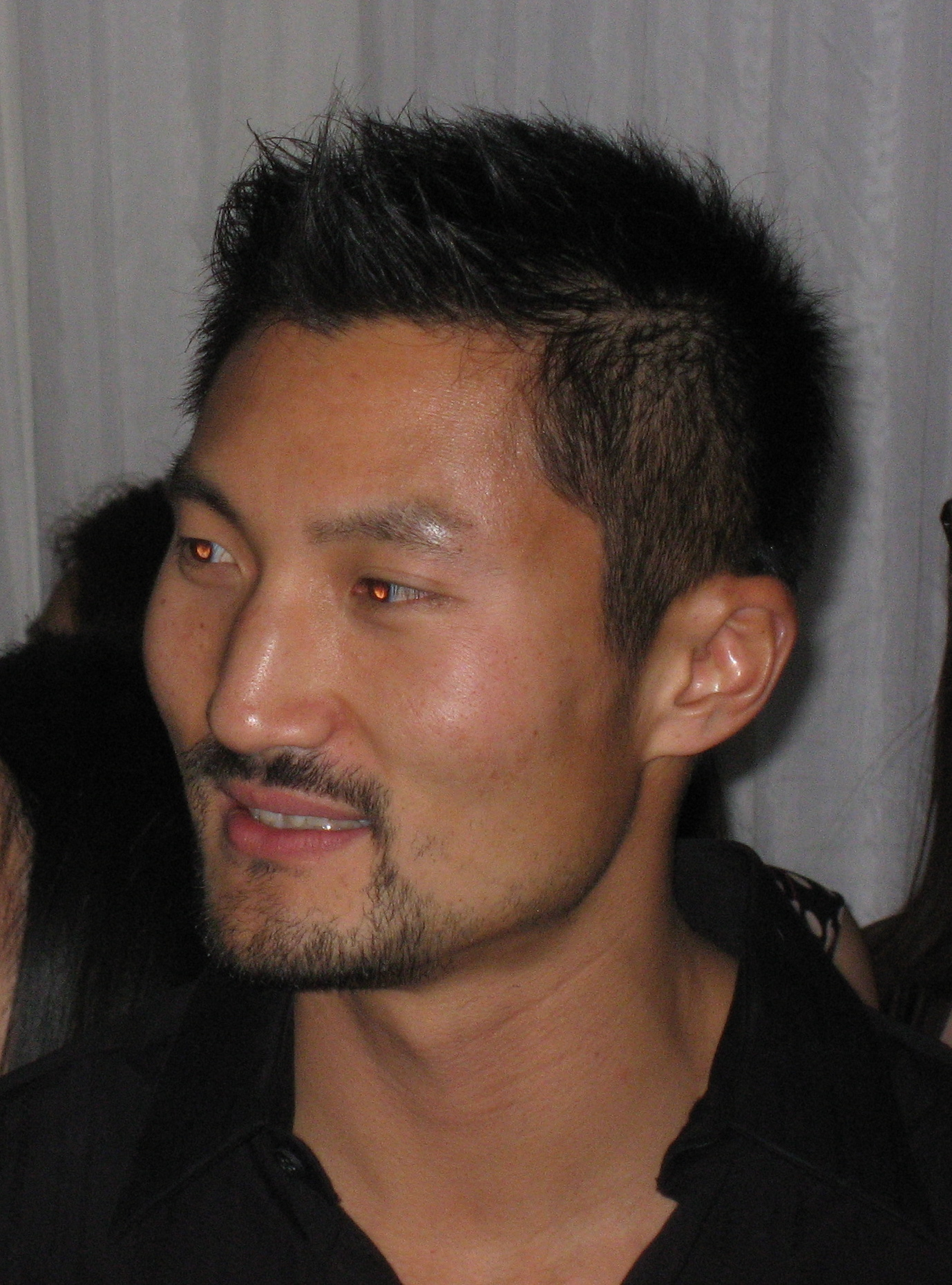
Kwon at the Survivor: Cook Islands finale

=== Cook Islands ===
In 2006, Kwon was recruited to participate in the thirteenth season of Survivor, which took place in the Cook Islands. This season was notable for the producers' decision to divide the contestants into tribes by their ethnicity, a decision that generated substantial controversy. When asked why he agreed to go on the show, he cited his desire to provide a positive role model for his community, and the lack of representation by Asian Americans on television.

Originally on the Asian American Puka Puka tribe, Kwon led his tribe to dominate in the first two tribal immunity challenges, while winning rewards on both occasions. On Puka Puka, Kwon developed a long-lasting alliance and friendship with fellow Korean-American attorney Rebekah "Becky" Lee. In Episode 2, Kwon was banished to Exile Island by the Hispanic Aitutaki tribe, after Aitutaki intentionally lost the second immunity challenge. On Exile Island, Kwon was able to decipher the clues and find the hidden immunity idol, which would be very instrumental to his survival later in the game.

In Episode Three, the four ethnically divided tribes integrated into two tribes, and both Kwon and Lee became members of the new Aitutaki tribe. Kwon and Lee immediately developed a four-person alliance with Jonathan Penner and Candice Woodcock of the old white Rarotonga tribe. When Aitutaki lost the next immunity challenge and the opposing new Rarotonga tribe sent Candice to Exile Island, Yul's alliance became outnumbered and Lee became a target. However, Kwon and Penner were able to convince Anh-Tuan "Cao Boi" Bui and Jessica "Flicka" Smith from their old respective tribes to side with them and voted out Cecilia Mansilla. After that, the new Aitutaki tribe enjoyed back-to-back immunity challenge wins in episodes 4 and 5.

In Episode Six, both tribes were informed they would have to vote someone out of their tribe, regardless of the challenge results. Despite being from the same original tribe, Kwon and his alliance voted out Cao Boi, seeing him as a loose cannon that was not to be trusted. It was around this point that Kwon, Lee, Penner and Woodcock recruited Sundra Oakley to their now 5-person alliance. In Episode 7, this new alliance targeted Oscar "Ozzy" Lusth due to his strength in challenges. But when the Aitutaki tribe lost immunity, they voted out Flicka, admitting they needed Ozzy for future challenges. Both tribes were now tied at 6 members each.

In Episode Eight, all remaining survivors were given the chance to "mutiny" and defect to the opposite tribe. Woodcock, who saw this as an opportunity to get back to her old Rarotonga tribemates and friends, Adam Gentry and Parvati Shallow, mutinied to the Rarotonga tribe, and Penner would subsequently follow Woodcock. The mutiny left Kwon, Lee, Oakley and Lusth as a tribe of four against a tribe of eight, and were dubbed as the "Aitu 4" as such. Despite these odds, the new Aitu 4 were able to dominate in the challenges and win four challenges in a row, sending Rarotonga to tribal council where they voted out Brad Virata, Rebecca Borman and (in a twist where they had to vote out two members in one tribal council) Jenny Guzon-Bae. These three survivors became members of the jury.

At the Final Nine, the two tribes (Aitutaki and Rarotonga) merged into Aitutonga. The Aitu 4 were still outnumbered by the five Rarotonga members. However, Kwon devised a plan to use the Hidden Immunity Idol to blackmail former ally and mutineer Penner. By using his Hidden Immunity Idol to threaten to eliminate Penner at Tribal Council, Penner decided to defect from Rarotonga and join the Aitu 4 to save himself. The Aitu 4 and Penner surprised Rarotonga at Tribal Council and voted out Nathan "Nate" Gonzalez. In the Survivor Auction at the Final 8, Kwon revealed to the remaining Rarotonga members and the host Jeff Probst that he held the Hidden Immunity Idol. The Aitu 4 and Penner continued to control the game and voted out their former ally and mutineer Woodcock.

At the Final Seven, Kwon, then dubbed the "Ringleader", "Puppet Master" and "Godfather", was constantly being pressured by the remaining Rarotonga members to vote out the traitor Penner. Knowing that their days in the game were numbered, Gentry and Shallow both threatened to vote against Kwon in the jury if Kwon refused to vote out Penner before them. Kwon made a deal with Gentry that if Penner was voted out ahead of him and Shallow, he would gain Gentry's vote in the jury, and Penner was voted out. In the next two Tribal Councils, Shallow and Gentry were voted out respectively, propelling the Aitu 4 into the final 4.

Once in the Final Four, Lee, Lusth, Oakley, and Kwon were shocked to hear that instead of a standard Final Two, the final tribal council would consist of three members. At the immunity challenge, Lusth continued to dominate, winning his spot in the Final Three. Kwon, still protected by the hidden immunity idol, was also safe. Both Lusth and Kwon agreed that the fairest decision would be a tie-breaker challenge between Lee and Oakley. Kwon offered his idol to Lee, but she declined. In the tie-breaker, neither Lee nor Oakley could start a fire with flint within a one-hour limit. Moving to matches, both still had trouble, and Oakley ran out of matches. Lee went on to win the challenge, moving her into the Final Three with Lusth and Kwon.

In the Final Tribal Council, Kwon was credited for his strategic prowess and his ability in the social aspect of the game, whereas Lusth was credited for his domination in the physical aspect of the game. In the end, Kwon beat out Ozzy Lusth and Becky Lee in a 5-4-0 vote to become the Sole Survivor, gaining the votes of Brad Virata, Candice Woodcock, Jonathan Penner, Adam Gentry, and Sundra Oakley.

=== Winners at War ===
Kwon returned to the game on Survivor: Winners at War after a 14-year and 27-season hiatus. He was originally a member of the Dakal tribe where he aligned himself with Sophie Clarke, Nick Wilson, and Wendell Holland. The four of them began targeting old-school players. Kwon then became a part of the Sele tribe following a tribal swap. He had a hand in voting off Amber Mariano, Tyson Apostol, and Parvati Shallow during the first three tribal councils he attended, but he later became the ninth person voted off and placed 14th on day 35 after not earning the right to return to the game from the Edge of Extinction. As a juror, Kwon cast his vote for eventual winner Tony Vlachos.

== Other media appearances ==
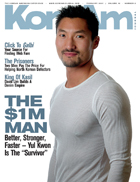
Kwon on the February 2007 cover of KoreAm

Shortly after winning Survivor, Kwon appeared on several talk shows, including Live with Regis & Kelly. He received positive media coverage for his strategic and honest gameplay, as well as for breaking stereotypes about Asian American men in the media.

In 2015, in the official issue of CBS Watch commemorating the 15th anniversary of Survivor, Kwon was voted by viewers as the 9th greatest contestant in Survivor history. At the time, he was one of only two one-time contestants to appear in the top 10, the other being Tony Vlachos of Survivor: Cagayan (who has since played again on Survivor: Game Changers and Survivor: Winners at War alongside Kwon). In a 2015 interview shortly before the premiere of the 30th season, host Jeff Probst declared Kwon to be one of his top 10 favorite Survivor winners ever, and one of his top 6 favorite male winners.

Kwon made several notable lists in 2006/2007, including People Magazine's Sexiest Men Alive, People Magazine's Hottest Bachelors, and Extra TV's Most Eligible Bachelors. He was profiled in VIBE Magazine's "Juice" issue as part of the New Power Generation, consisting of people who will shape the future. An online poll by Entertainment Weekly also found Kwon to be the favorite Survivor winner among its readers. In 2017, the magazine also had fans rank the 34 winners of Survivor and Kwon was ranked 9th.

In 2007, Kwon worked as a special correspondent for CNN on a series exploring issues affecting the Asian American community. The series, Uncovering America, aired on CNN's American Morning. The topics Kwon examined included the portrayal of Asian Americans in the media, the glass ceiling in the corporate workplace, and affirmative action. He was also interviewed regarding these issues on Anderson Cooper 360. In July 2022, Kwon competed on the USA Network's reality competition series, Snake in the Grass.

== Personal life ==
Kwon proposed to his girlfriend, Sophie Tan, in April 2008. The couple had been set up by one of Kwon's Survivor tribemates, Brad Virata. The couple was married in 2009 at Clos La Chance winery in San Martin, California. The ceremony was televised and aired on the TV Guide Channel. Kwon and his wife have two children.

Preceded by Aras Baskauskas	Winner of Survivor; Survivor: Cook Islands	Succeeded by Earl Cole
