= The Last Supper (1995 film) =

1995 film by Stacy Title

- Theatrical release poster
- Directed by: Stacy Title
- Written by: Dan Rosen
- Produced by: Matt Cooper; Larry Weinberg
- Starring: Jason Alexander; Cameron Diaz; Nora Dunn; Charles Durning; Ron Eldard; Annabeth Gish; Mark Harmon; Bill Paxton; Jonathan Penner; Ron Perlman; Courtney B. Vance
- Cinematography: Paul Cameron
- Edited by: Luis Colina
- Music by: Mark Mothersbaugh
- Production companies: The Vault, Inc.
- Distributed by: Sony Pictures Releasing
- Release dates: September 8, 1995 (TIFF); April 5, 1996 (United States)
- Running time: 92 minutes
- Country: United States
- Language: English
- Budget: $500,000
- Box office: $459,749

The Last Supper is a 1995 American satirical black comedy film directed by Stacy Title. It stars Cameron Diaz, Ron Eldard, Annabeth Gish, Jonathan Penner and Courtney B. Vance as five liberal graduate school students (all carrying disciples' names from the bible) who invite a string of extreme conservatives to dinner in order to murder them. In Canada, the film premiered at the 1995 Toronto International Film Festival. In the United States, the film premiered at the 1996 Sundance Film Festival on January 27, 1996.

== Plot ==
Jude, Pete, Paulie, Marc and Luke are graduate school students living together in a house in Iowa. Marc is an aspiring painter, Pete is a law student from a wealthy family, Paulie is studying social work, Jude is studying psychology and Luke is completing a doctorate in political science.

After Zack, a Desert Storm veteran and truck driver, helps move Pete's car, the group invites him to have dinner at their home. However, Zack turns out to be racist, xenophobic and a Holocaust denier who praises Adolf Hitler, leading to a tense political debate with the liberal students.

The evening takes a turn for the worse when the veteran snaps and holds a knife to Marc's throat, threatening to kill him and rape Paulie. Zack releases Marc, and then Pete holds a knife to his throat, but he easily incapacitates Pete and breaks his arm. After Zack releases Pete, Marc fatally stabs Zack in the back, and the group decides to cover up the murder. Paulie regrets that Zack is dead even though he threatened her and Marc.

After a long discussion, the students decide to follow up this event by inviting other conservatives for dinner to murder them, reasoning this would "make the world a better place". They lay down a procedure for each murder. The guest will be given every opportunity to change his/her mind and recant his/her beliefs. If the guest fails to change their ways by dessert, the guest is offered poisoned white wine from a blue decanter and raises a toast. The bodies are buried in the vegetable garden.

Guests, all of whom are murdered, include a homophobic protestant reverend; a misogynistic, chauvinistic rape apologist; a Neo-Nazi; an anti-environmentalist; a racist, anti-Semitic Nation of Islam fundamentalist; an anti-abortion activist; a censorship advocate; a man who beats homeless people (the only dinner guest who momentarily considers recanting his beliefs); and critics of gay rights.

After ten murders, misgivings begin to surface within the group as a few grow indecisive regarding the justification of their actions. Infighting and guilt compel them to spare a teenage opponent of mandatory sex education, despite the protests of Luke and Pete.

Sheriff Alice Stanley, investigating the whereabouts of missing girl Jenny Tyler, comes upon the group. By coincidence, the main suspect in the case is Zack, their first victim, who was also a convicted sex offender. The sheriff grows suspicious of the students’ behavior, questioning Pete, Marc, and Paulie at their home. Finding Stanley trespassing in their backyard, Luke – increasingly unhinged – kills Stanley, unbeknownst to the rest.

During a school break, Luke and Pete meet famous conservative pundit Norman Arbuthnot, a regular on TV news and talk shows, and invite him to dinner. During dinner, Norman stymies them with his moderate and persuasive arguments, all of which the usually argumentative group has difficulty debunking. He even admits that he says more radically conservative things mostly for attention.

The frustrated students all excuse themselves to the kitchen to determine Norman's fate. Before excusing himself, Jude warns Norman that the wine in the blue bottle has gone bad. In the kitchen, after a brief discussion, only Luke still wishes to kill Norman, calling him Hitler. After a tense altercation, Luke is dissuaded and breaks down into tears.

Meanwhile, Norman examines the home and pieces together their murderous activities. When they return to the table, Norman presents them with glasses of wine and offers them a toast but does not drink himself, with the excuse that he has to fly his private plane. He puffs on a huge cigar and says, "Don't worry, I didn't pour any of the bad wine."

A closing shot of a painting portrays all five students collapsed on the floor, with Norman standing next to the blue bottle and smoking his cigar. The film ends with audio of Norman speculating about his possible presidential bid to a cheering crowd, pledging to do the people's will.

== Cast ==
- Cameron Diaz as Jude
- Ron Eldard as Pete
- Annabeth Gish as Paulie
- Jonathan Penner as Marc
- Courtney B. Vance as Luke
- Jason Alexander as Anti-Environmentalist
- Nora Dunn as Sheriff Stanley
- Charles Durning as Reverend Hutchens
- Bryn Erin as Heather
- Warren Hutcherson as Nation Man
- Nicholas Sadler as Homeless Basher
- Rachel Chagall as Abortion Activist
- Mark Harmon as Dominant Male
- Bill Paxton as Zack
- Ron Perlman as Norman Arbuthnot

== Production ==
The character of Norman Arbuthnot was loosely based on a real-life pundit Rush Limbaugh. Beau Bridges was originally asked to play the role, but turned it down. Ron Perlman was so enthusiastic after reading the script that he threatened to break his friendship with director Stacy Title if he did not get the role. In the movie, one of the producers has a cameo as the man getting his book signed by Arbuthnot. The screenplay's author, Dan Rosen, also had a small role as Deputy Hartford. Elisabeth Moss stars as Jenny Tyler on the missing person's posters.

Director Stacy Title was the cousin of co-star Jason Alexander's wife, Daena Title, and was married to Jonathan Penner. the actor who played Marc. Title managed to shoot the movie in just 18 days. Bill Paxton, moreover, shot his cameo during a weekend off from filming Apollo 13. For the role of Jude, Stacy Title and her fellow filmmakers wanted Cameron Diaz to play the part of the pretty, innocent Paulie but Cameron Diaz asked for a greater challenge and to play more vocal, opinionated, ruthless Jude.

== Soundtrack ==
The Last Supper soundtrack album was released on 2 April 1996 and features artists such as KC & The Sunshine Band, Ten Years After, UB40, Sam Phillips, Los Lobos, Wild Colonials and The Toys. Shonen Knife's cover of The Carpenters' "Top of the World" plays during the closing credits.

== Reception ==
=== Critical response ===
The Last Supper has a 61% "Fresh" rating on Rotten Tomatoes, based on 38 reviews. The website's critics consensus reads, "It struggles to find a balance between its humor and its message, but The Last Supper's sharp script and well-chosen cast offer just enough nourishment for fans of black comedy." Roger Ebert of the Chicago Sun-Times gave the film three out of four stars, writing that although it is too long and repetitive, he appreciated its lack of partisanship. He described the film as "a brave effort in a timid time, a Swiftian attempt to slap us all in the face and get us to admit that our own freedoms depend precisely on those of our neighbors, our opponents and, yes, our enemies." M.V Moorhead of the Phoenix New Times opined that the film’s "level of satiric discourse" could have been more " genuinely provocative". Janet Maslin, reviewing the film in The New York Times, was far more critical of the storyline, criticising it for its "lumbering obviousness and sophomoric political debate", and "conventional and unsurprising" plot. In a review for The Washington Post, Rita Kempley described it as "sour, repetitive fare", and "glib, morally muddy, overly schematic".

=== Box office ===
The film grossed $459,749 in limited release in the domestic box office and was considered unsuccessful, even for an independent movie. However, it has gained momentum amongst Generation-X for its portrayal of the zeitgeist of the early 1990s.

== Awards and honors ==
Awards and Nominations received by The Last Supper
Award	Category	Nominee	Result
1996 Festival du Film Policier de Cognac	Grand Prix	The Last Supper	Won
