= J'Tia Hart =

Nuclear Engineer and reality television participant

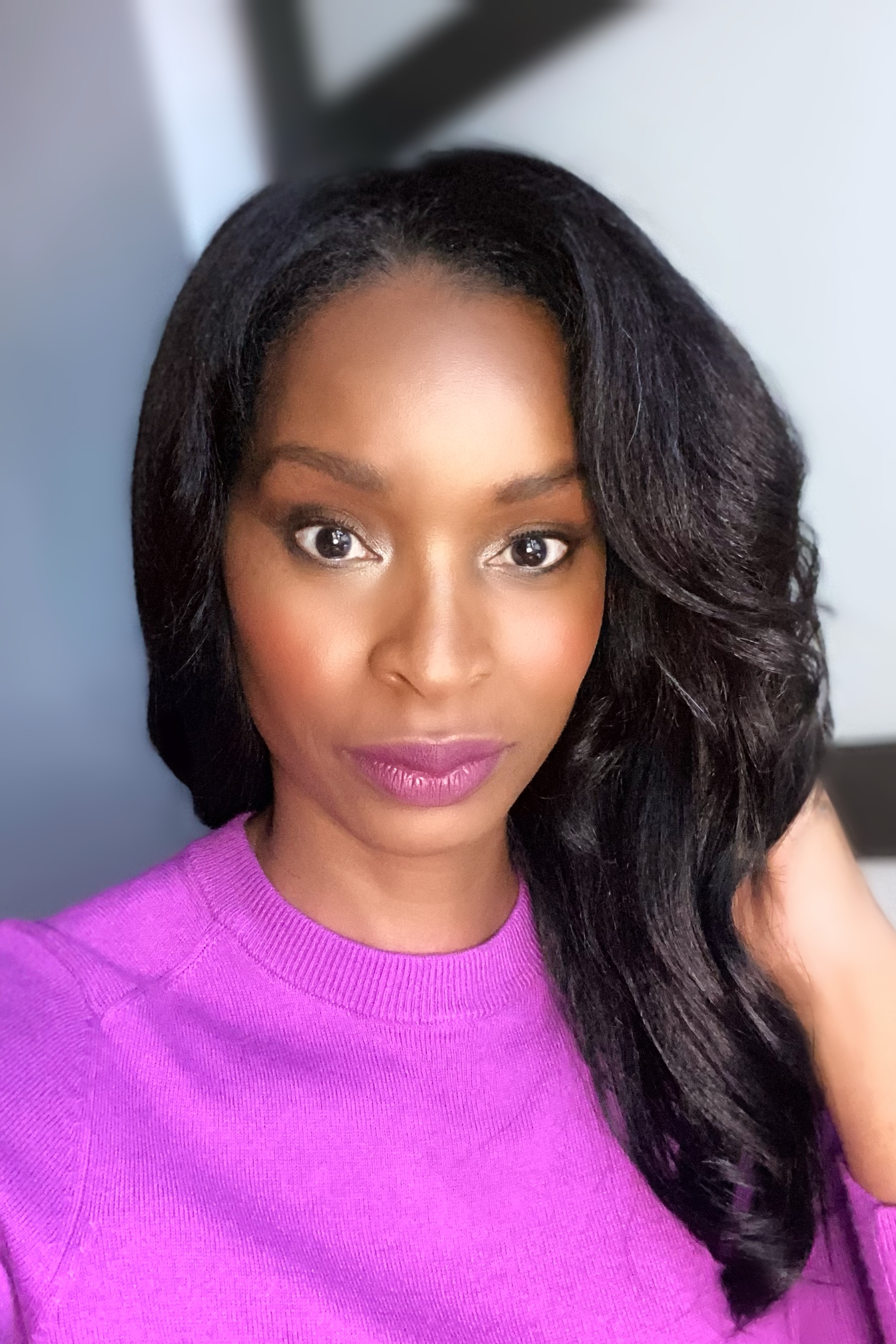
- Hart in 2020
- Born: September 1, 1981 (age 44)
- Education: Florida State University, University of Illinois at Urbana-Champaign
- Occupation: Nuclear Engineer
- Television: Survivor: Cagayan
- Spouse: Graeme Ross Hart (m. 2015)
- Children: 2

J'Tia Hart (née Taylor; born September 1, 1981) is a nuclear engineer and television personality. She is the Chief Science Officer for National and Homeland Security at the Idaho National Laboratory and competed on Survivor: Cagayan.

== Early life and education ==
Hart is a native of Miami and the youngest of 10 children. She attended Miami-Dade County Public Schools. While studying at Hialeah Miami Lakes Senior High School she pursued extra mathematics and science classes, which lead to an early graduation at the age of 15. Hart continued her studies at Florida State University. At 17 Hart took a school trip to visit a nuclear submarine, which piqued her interest. Despite her interest in math, science, and nuclear engineering Hart first pursued a career in modeling before earning her master's and doctoral degrees in nuclear engineering from the University of Illinois at Urbana-Champaign. She was the first Black woman to receive a PhD from the department.

== Nuclear engineering career ==
Hart previously worked as a program lead at Argonne National Lab before becoming the Chief Science Officer at Idaho National Laboratory.

Hart is an advocate for women and people of color in STEM. She is the founder of STEM Queens, a web series highlighting the accomplishments of Black women in STEM. Hart is also an If/Then ambassador and was featured in the Smithsonian's "#IfThenSheCan – The Exhibit", a collection of life-sized 3D-printed statues of role models in STEM.

== Survivor Cagayan (2014) ==
In 2014, Hart (then Taylor) had been cast into the twenty-eighth season of Survivor, Survivor: Cagayan - Brawn vs. Brains vs. Beauty where Hart was cast on Luzon—the brain tribe—alongside Garrett Adelstein, Spencer Bledsoe, Tasha Fox, Kass McQuillen and David Samson.

Hart became infamous for unintentionally annoying her tribe in the first episode due to her being perceived as bossy and taking control of building the shelter. After Luzon lost the first immunity challenge, Hart aligned with Adelstein, Bledsoe and Fox to vote Samson out first due to him being seen as untrustworthy. After Luzon lost the second immunity challenge, due to Hart being unable to complete the puzzle, despite being the first person to start it, Adelstein was determined to send Hart out of the game, so restricted anyone from talking to each other, which annoyed Fox and Hart. While the tribe, minus Hart, went to the water Hart dumped nearly all of the tribe's rice into the fire, admitting to it at tribal council. Despite all this, Hart was spared as Fox and McQuillen voted out Adelstein due to fear of being on the bottom of the tribe.

Luzon won the third immunity challenge, but went on to lose the fourth one, once again due to Hart's struggles with challenges, even losing to Aparri (brawn), who were trying to throw the challenge, where Fox and McQuillen voted Hart out over Bledsoe, due to fears of challenge losses.

=== Post-show ===
After competing on season 28 of Survivor, Hart created a petition for the show to become more diverse.

== Personal life ==
Hart lives in Chicago with her husband and two children.
