= Dan Rosen =

American screenwriter and director (born 1963)

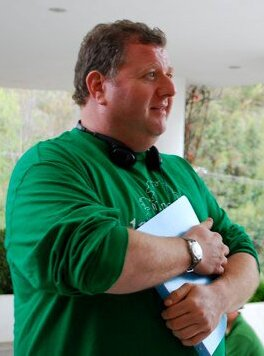
- Rosen on the set of Freeloaders
- Born: November 11, 1963 (age 63); Baltimore, Maryland, U.S.
- Occupations: Screenwriter, film director
- Website: rosenreads.com (Archived)

Dan Rosen (born November 11, 1963) is an American screenwriter and film director.

Rosen is best known for the films The Last Supper, which he wrote, as well as Freeloaders and The Curve, both of which he wrote/co-wrote and directed. The Last Supper and The Curve premiered at the Sundance Film Festival.

In 2012, Rosen joined the writing staff of sitcom The First Family, rising from staff writer to supervising producer over the course of the show's run, writing four episodes (including the first season finale).

Since 2017, Rosen assisted other screenwriters to improve their work via his website, now defunct.
