= Jonathan Penner =

American actor

- Born: March 5, 1962 (age 63); New York City, New York, U.S.
- Occupations: Screenwriter; producer; actor
- Years active: 1989–present
- Known for: The Last Supper; The Bye Bye Man; Survivor: Cook Islands; Survivor: Micronesia; Survivor: Philippines
- Spouse: Stacy Title (m. 1991; died 2021)
- Children: 2

Jonathan Lindsay Penner (born March 5, 1962) is an American actor, screenwriter, television personality, and film producer, known for producing and starring in the film The Last Supper, as well as acting in the television series Rude Awakening and The Naked Truth. He is also known for his multiple appearances on the American competitive reality series Survivor.

== Life and career ==
Penner was born in New York City. He has had roles in television series Grapevine, The Naked Truth and Rude Awakening, and guest-starred on Seinfeld, CSI, CSI: NY, The Tick, Melrose Place, LateLine, Arrested Development, and The Nanny, where he appeared in two episodes as Danny Imperiali, whose firing and dumping of fiancée Fran Fine kicked off the entire series.

Penner has appeared in many films, with featured roles in Anarchy TV, Down Periscope, and The Last Supper, the latter of which he also co-produced, and which was directed by his wife, Stacy Title.

He had a small role in Dragon: The Bruce Lee Story (1993). Penner was nominated for Best Live Action Short Film at the Academy Awards in 1994 for Down on the Waterfront, which he co-produced, co-wrote, and starred in, along with Jason Alexander and Edward Asner.

He co-wrote the script for the 2003 The WB-produced re-imagining of The Lone Ranger, and later the 2017 horror film The Bye Bye Man. He is developing a King Kong television series for MarVista Entertainment and IM Global Television.

Penner resides in Los Angeles, California, with his two children: Ellis, born in 1999, and Cooper, born in 1995. He was married to director Stacy Title from 1991 until her death in 2021; he was introduced to Stacy by his friend Jason Alexander, who is married to Stacy's cousin, Daena Title.

== Filmography ==
Acting credits
Year	Title	Role	Notes
1989	A Fool and His Money	Morris Codman	Film
1990	White Palace	Marv Miller	Film
1992	Grapevine	David Klein	TV series
1993	Dragon: The Bruce Lee Story	Studio Executive	Film
1993	Melrose Place	Joel Walker	Episode titled 'Married to It'
1993	The Nanny	Danny	TV series
1993	Coneheads	Captain, Air Traffic	Film
1993	Jason Goes To Hell: The Final Friday	David (Scenes Deleted)	Film
1995	The Last Supper	Marc	Film; also served as co-executive producer
1995-1997	The Naked Truth	Nick Columbus	TV series
1996	Down Periscope	Stanley 'Spots' Sylvesterson	Film
1998	Anarchy TV	Jerry	Film
1998	Seinfeld	Zach	Episode titled 'The Bookstore'
1998	LateLine	Paul	Episode titled 'Gale Gets a Life'
1998-2000	Rude Awakening	Dave Parelli	TV series
2001	The Tick	Steve Filbert	Episode titled 'The Big Leagues'
2004	Arrested Development	Detective Fellows	Episode titled 'Not Without my Daughter'
2004	CSI	Detective Travis	Episode titled 'Viva Las Vegas'
2006	E-Ring	FBI Agent Jaffe	Episode titled 'Five Pillars'
2006	CSI: New York	Newt Glick	Episode titled 'Run Silent, Run Deep'
2006	Hood of Horror	Fowler	Film
2006	Survivor: Cook Islands	Contestant	Eliminated; 7th Place
2008	Survivor: Micronesia	Contestant	Medically Evacuated; 15th Place
2012	Survivor: Philippines	Contestant	Eliminated; 7th Place
2017	The Bye Bye Man	Mr. Daizy	Film

Writing credits
Year	Title	Notes
1999	Let the Devil Wear Black	
2003	The Lone Ranger	Television film
2017	The Bye Bye Man	

== Survivor ==
In addition to his acting and writing credits, Penner is perhaps best known as a three-time contestant on Survivor.

=== Cook Islands ===
Penner was a contestant on Survivor: Cook Islands in 2006. He was one of the original five members of the Rarotonga tribe (Raro). He quickly became notorious among the cast for stealing another tribe's chicken on the first day. In episode three, the four tribes evenly divided into two new mixed tribes, Aitutaki and Rarotonga. Penner found himself on Aitutaki (Aitu). While a member of Aitu, he became part of an alliance that consisted of Yul Kwon, Candice Woodcock, Becky Lee and Sundra Oakley. This alliance lasted until episode eight when the members of Aitu and Raro were offered a chance to mutiny by joining the opposing tribe. Penner, along with Woodcock, chose to leave Aitu for Raro, the only two castaways to accept the offer. After the merge, he flipped again and voted with the former Aitus. Ultimately, Kwon voted him out to appease the former Raro members, who viewed Penner as duplicitous for having betrayed them. He was the fourteenth person voted out, finishing in seventh place. As his torch was snuffed, he turned to the Final Six and said, "And I'd like my hat back at some point", then left (Kwon actually did bring his hat back to him at the next Tribal Council). Penner humbly voted for Kwon to win in the Final Tribal Council.

=== Micronesia ===
Penner was also a contestant on Survivor: Micronesia — Fans vs. Favorites, the 16th season of Survivor which aired in 2008. He was one of ten returning favorites on the Malakal tribe and later switched to Airai. He was removed from the game during the sixth episode, due to a life-threatening infection in his injured knee. The Survivor medics stated that he had no choice but to be evacuated from the game as the sixth person to leave the competition.

=== Philippines ===
Penner returned to play the game for a third time on Survivor: Philippines, the 25th season of Survivor. He was one of the three returning players who had been medically evacuated during their previous season, the others being Michael Skupin (Survivor: The Australian Outback) and Russell Swan (Survivor: Samoa). During the season, Penner worked quite closely with castaway and fellow actress Lisa Whelchel. He ended up being the 11th person voted out, placing seventh overall, which is where he had also finished the first time he participated on Survivor. At the Final Tribal Council, he voted for Denise Stapley to win after claiming that Skupin and Whelchel were "ridden in like oxen" by Stapley, who indeed proved to be the eventual winner.

In total, Penner has spent 78 days playing the Survivor game. In an interview following his departure from Survivor: Philippines, he said he would be open to returning for another season.
