= Freeloaders (film) =

- Movie poster
- Directed by: Dan Rosen
- Written by: Dan Rosen; Dave Gibbs
- Produced by: Adam Duritz; Richard Perello; Tom Gardner; Julia Dray; Gregory P. Cimino III; Tim Naughton
- Starring: Josh Lawson; Kevin Sussman; Zoe Boyle; Nat Faxon; Warren Hutcherson; Brit Morgan; Clifton Collins, Jr. Jane Seymour; Olivia Munn; Dave Foley
- Cinematography: Joey Forsyte
- Edited by: Brad E. Wilhite; George Folsey, Jr.
- Music by: Dave Gibbs; John Dragonetti; Zach Selwyn
- Production companies: ATG Productions; Broken Lizard Industries; Matthew Pritzker Films
- Distributed by: Myriad Pictures
- Release date: December 18, 2012 (VOD)
- Running time: 77 minutes
- Country: United States
- Language: English

Freeloaders is a 2012 American ensemble comedy film directed by Dan Rosen, and written by Rosen and singer Dave Gibbs. The film is produced by the Broken Lizard comedy troupe and is independently financed. Freeloaders stars Clifton Collins Jr., Josh Lawson, Kevin Sussman, Zoe Boyle, Nat Faxon, Warren Hutcherson, Jane Seymour, Olivia Munn, Dave Foley, and Counting Crows lead singer Adam Duritz. It follows a group of friends who find their luxurious lifestyle threatened when the rock star they freeload off decides to sell his home.

== Premise ==
Six slackers who mooch off Counting Crows frontman Adam Duritz and have been crashing at his California mansion for years struggle to maintain their lifestyle when he informs them that he is selling his home. Individually, the friends seek new living arrangements to no avail, so they attempt to prevent the sale of the home altogether, as well as raise money to purchase it.

== Cast ==
- Josh Lawson as Dave
- Kevin Sussman as Benedict "Benny" Visvikis
- Zoe Boyle as Emma Greenwood
- Nat Faxon as Fritz
- Warren Hutcherson as Trane
- Brit Morgan as Samantha
- Clifton Collins, Jr. as Vic
- Jane Seymour as Carolyn
- Olivia Munn as Madeline
- Dave Foley as himself
- Adam Duritz as himself
- Denise Richards as herself
- Richard Branson as himself
- Jay Chandrasekhar and Paul Soter as Porn Producers
- Kevin Heffernan as Scotty the Boom Guy
- Steve Lemme as Captain Clam Beard
- Erik Stolhanske as Jolly Roger

== Development ==
Freeloaders was brought to Broken Lizard early into its development, to help gain funding to produce the project. Principal photography was scheduled to begin in January 2009. As of October 2010, Freeloaders had entered into post-production and was awaiting distribution. On October 1, 2010, the film was privately screened by Broken Lizard and Duritz at the John Anson Ford Amphitheatre in Los Angeles. On November 3, 2011, Myriad Pictures acquired all distribution rights to the film outside of North America.
