= The Lone Ranger (2003 film) =

2003 American western action television film by Jack Bender

- Title card
- Genre: Western; Action
- Based on: Lone Ranger by: Fran Striker Jr.; George W. Trendle
- Written by: Stacy Title and Jonathan Penner
- Directed by: Jack Bender
- Starring: Chad Michael Murray; Nathaniel Arcand
- Theme music composer: Roger Neill
- Country of origin: United States
- Original language: English
- No. of episodes: 1

Production
- Producers: Susanne Daniels; Mel Efros; Eric Ellenbogen
- Cinematography: Steven Fierberg
- Editors: Luis Colina; Mark Melnick
- Running time: 120 minutes
- Production companies: TNT Productions; Turner Television; Warner Bros. Television

Original release
- Network: The WB
- Release: February 26, 2003

The Lone Ranger is a 2003 American western action television film. It was an attempt by The WB to revive the Lone Ranger franchise for a new generation. The character first appeared in 1933 in a radio show conceived either by WXYZ (Detroit) radio station owner George W. Trendle, or by Fran Striker, the show's writer. The radio series proved to be a hit and spawned a series of books (largely written by Striker), an equally popular television show that ran from 1949 to 1957, comic books, and several movies.

The film, intended as a pilot for a new television series, stars Chad Michael Murray as the Lone Ranger (the name of the Ranger's secret identity was changed from "John Reid" to "Luke Hartman") and Nathaniel Arcand as his Native American companion Tonto.

== Plot ==
This version takes a look at the character in the years before he became a legend. It all begins with the introduction of Luke Hartman, a 20-year-old Boston law student who witnesses the murder of his brother, a Texas Ranger. He himself is wounded in the midst of the chaos, but is rescued by the Apache Tonto, and subsequently becomes smitten with Tonto's sister Alope. He then devotes his life to avenging the death of his brother and fighting injustice, and in the process becoming a worldwide legend.

== Cast ==
- Chad Michael Murray as The Lone Ranger / Luke Hartman
- Nathaniel Arcand as Tonto
- Anita Brown as Alope
- Fay Masterson as Grace Hartman
- Sebastian Spence as Harmon Hartman
- Dylan Walsh as Kansas City Haas
- Wes Studi as Kulakinah
- Bradford Tatum as Tryon
- Jeffrey Nordling as James Landry
- Lauren German as Emily Landry
- Tod Thawley as Tera
- Gil Birmingham as One Horn
- Paul Schulze as Sheriff Landry
- Mike Weinberg as Harmon Jr.

== Critical reception ==
The show was met with mixed reviews, criticizing the changes to the characters, comedy and soundtrack, and the pilot didn't get picked up for a full series.
