= Robert Damon Schneck =

Robert Damon Schneck is an American writer specializing in anomalous phenomena and historical oddities.

A resident of New Jersey, Schneck is the author of The President's Vampire and regular contributor to Fortean Times and Fate. He is director of the White Crow Society, a group that aims to educate and help those who have witnessed or experienced paranormal or other strange phenomena.

A chapter from The President's Vampire was adapted into the screenplay for the horror film The Bye Bye Man, released in January 2017 by Dimension Films/STX.

He is also the author of Mrs. Wakeman vs. The Antichrist, a collection of unusual tales from American history.

== Bibliography ==
=== Books ===
- The President's Vampire: Strange-but-True Tales of the United States of America, Anomalist Books, paperback, 2005. ISBN 1-933665-00-9
- Mrs. Wakeman vs. the Antichrist: And Other Strange-but-True Tales from American History, Tarcher Penguin, paperback, 2014. ISBN 9781585429448

=== Articles ===
- "Death Had a Sagittal Crest", Fate 52 (2) #587, 1999.
- "You Don't Know Squatch", Fate 52 (4) #589, 1999.
- "The God Machine", Fortean Times #158, 2002, about John Murray Spear
- "The President's Vampire", Fortean Times #189, 2004.
- "Holy Geist!," Fortean Times #228, 2007.
- "America's Psychic: Jeane Dixon," Fortean Times #243, 2008.
- "The Headless Evangelist," Fortean Times #334, 2015.
