= Let the Devil Wear Black =

- DVD Cover
- Directed by: Stacy Title
- Screenplay by: Stacy Title; Jonathan Penner
- Based on: Hamlet by William Shakespeare
- Produced by: Matt Salinger
- Starring: Randall Batinkoff; Jacqueline Bisset; Maury Chaykin; Philip Baker Hall; Mary-Louise Parker; Jonathan Penner; Norman Reedus; Jamey Sheridan
- Cinematography: Jim Whitaker
- Music by: Christophe Beck
- Production company: New Moon Productions
- Distributed by: A-Pix Entertainment
- Release date: 1999
- Running time: 89 minutes
- Country: United States
- Language: English

Let the Devil Wear Black is a 1999 crime thriller film directed by Stacy Title and co-written by Title and her husband, actor Jonathan Penner. It is a modern retelling of the classic play Hamlet.

== Background ==
The film is a modern-day version of William Shakespeare's Hamlet set in Los Angeles. Its promotional tagline is "Something is Rotten in the City of Angels."

The film reworks various Shakespearean plot devices. All of the language is modern. Comparisons are easy to spot between the play and the film if the person is familiar with the play. Even though it is based on Hamlet, Christopher Null of Film Critic said it still has enough originality. Before the film was rated, Joe Leydon of Variety said that a couple of relatively explicit sex scenes would have to be cut if the producers wanted an R rating.

== Plot ==
Jack, a grad student who has a history of mental illness, can not get over the death of his father. Jack decides to take over his father's business. After receiving an anonymous tip that his father was murdered, he tries to put together the murder scheme. Soon after, he settles on his uncle Carl as the prime suspect. At the same time, he realizes that his life is in danger.

== Cast ==
- Jonathan Penner as Jack Lyne
- Randall Batinkoff as Bradbury
- Norman Reedus as Brautigan
- Jacqueline Bisset as Helen Lyne
- Mary-Louise Parker as Julia Hirsch
- Jamey Sheridan as Carl Lyne
- Chris Sarandon as Mr. Lyne
- Andrea Martin as April
- Philip Baker Hall as Sol Hirsch
- Joanna Gleason as Dr. Rona Harvey
- Jonathan Banks as Satch
- Maury Chaykin as Bruce

== Home media ==
The DVD was released in 2000 in English and German. It has 15 chapters, Dolby Digital 5.1 sound, pan and scan transfer, Spanish subtitles, and a moving video scene index menu. The special features are behind-the-scenes footage and two versions of the film's trailer.

== Reception ==
A Reel Film review said the actors are good, and the somber tone makes the film watchable. Christopher Null, of Film Critic, said that the film's most priceless moment is when the character Ophelia samples dog food.
