= The Bye Bye Man =

2017 horror film directed by Stacy Title

- Theatrical release poster
- Directed by: Stacy Title
- Written by: Jonathan Penner
- Based on: The Bridge to Body Island by Robert Damon Schneck
- Produced by: Trevor Macy; Jeffrey Soros; Simon Horsman
- Starring: Douglas Smith; Michael Trucco; Lucien Laviscount; Cressida Bonas; Doug Jones; Carrie-Anne Moss; Faye Dunaway; Jenna Kanell
- Cinematography: James Kniest
- Edited by: Ken Blackwell
- Music by: The Newton Brothers
- Production companies: STXfilms; H. Brothers; Los Angeles Media Fund; Tang Media Productions; Intrepid Pictures
- Distributed by: STX Entertainment
- Release date: January 13, 2017
- Running time: 96 minutes
- Country: United States
- Language: English
- Budget: $6.2–7.4 million
- Box office: $31.2 million

The Bye Bye Man is a 2017 American supernatural horror film directed by Stacy Title (in her final directed film before her death) and written by Jonathan Penner, based on the chapter "The Bridge to Body Island" in Robert Damon Schneck's book The President's Vampire. The film stars Douglas Smith, Lucien Laviscount, Cressida Bonas, Doug Jones, Carrie-Anne Moss, Faye Dunaway, and Jenna Kanell.

Principal photography began on November 2, 2015, in Cleveland, Ohio. STXfilms released the film on January 13, 2017. The film received negative reviews from critics but grossed $31.2 million worldwide on a budget of $6.2‒7.4 million, and was the last film directed by Stacy Title, who died in January 2021 from ALS.

== Plot ==
In 1969, a mass shooting occurs in Madison, Wisconsin, during which a man kills people on his block. As he shoots the neighbors, he continuously asks if anyone said "the name" that cannot be said. He repeats over and over: "Don't say it, don't think it; don't think it, don't say it".

In the present day, Elliot, his girlfriend, Sasha, and his friend, John, move into a house near their college. Strange things begin to happen, such as Elliot finding coins in his nightstand, coins that keep reappearing, and writing that says, "don't think it, don't say it" with a name – the Bye Bye Man. During a séance involving their friend Kim, the name is mentioned.

Sasha gets sick, as Elliot and John start experiencing hallucinations. A librarian shows Elliot a dossier about the Bye Bye Man. A teenager killed his family and told a reporter that the Bye Bye Man made him do it. The same reporter later became a mass shooter in 1969. Kim is struck by a train and killed. Her suicide note reveals that she killed her roommate and was planning on killing Elliot, Sasha, and John.

Elliot visits the reporter's widow, who reveals that the curse causes insanity, hallucinations, and then death. The only way to prevent it is not to think of his name or speak of him. If someone already knows, they must be killed. The librarian is accidentally hit by Elliot's car after she kills everyone in her home, having been targeting him next.

Elliot finds John stabbing Sasha and shoots him, only to realize that Sasha was stabbing John. The Bye Bye Man appears, and Elliot hallucinates. He keeps his brother Virgil and Virgil's daughter Alice away long enough for him to kill himself.

While riding home, Alice reveals she found the coins from the nightstand, along with the writing, but she could not read it in the dark. Detective Shaw arrives at the scene, where John is found alive. John then whispers the name to Shaw, allowing the Bye Bye Man's curse to spread again.

== Cast ==
- Douglas Smith as Elliot
- Cressida Bonas as Sasha
- Lucien Laviscount as John
- Carrie-Anne Moss as Detective Shaw
- Doug Jones as the Bye Bye Man
- Faye Dunaway as Widow Redmon
  - Keelin Woodell as Young Widow Redmon
- Michael Trucco as Virgil
- Jenna Kanell as Kim Hines
- Cleo King as Mrs. Watkins
- Erica Tremblay as Alice
- Leigh Whannell as Larry
- Jonathan Penner as Mr. Daizy

== Production ==
On September 11, 2014, TWC-Dimension acquired the worldwide distribution rights to the then-forthcoming supernatural thriller film The Bye Bye Man. Jonathan Penner adapted the script from "The Bridge to Body Island", a chapter in Robert Damon Schneck's non-fiction book The President's Vampire (Anomalist Books 2005; later retitled The Bye-Bye Man and Other Strange-But-True Tales when reprinted by Penguin-Random House in 2016.) "The Bridge to Body Island" tells an allegedly true story that was related to Schneck. The story concerns a group of friends who used a Ouija board to obtain the story of a mysterious supernatural killer from Louisiana known as the "Bye-Bye Man". The killer can supposedly be unwittingly summoned by saying or even thinking his name. The group of friends claimed they began experiencing strange events after they received this story from the Ouija board.

Stacy Title directed the film, which Intrepid Pictures produced, with its founder Trevor Macy. On June 23, 2015, Los Angeles Media Fund came on board to finance and co-produce the film. Jeffrey Soros and Simon Horsman also produced the film through LAMF. On November 4, 2015, STX Entertainment acquired the worldwide distribution rights to the film, and also co-financed the film. David Prior also adapted the book, along with Penner. Melinda Nishioka was a co-producer.

Principal photography on the film began on November 2, 2015, in Cleveland, Ohio, and wrapped on December 11, 2015.

The Newton Brothers composed the music for the film. Sony Classical Records has released the soundtrack featuring a song performance by the composers and Richard Patrick.

== Release ==
The Bye Bye Man was released on January 13, 2017. It had originally been scheduled for October 14, 2016, before being moved up to June 3, 2016, and later pushed back to December 9, 2016.

== Reception ==
=== Box office ===
The Bye Bye Man grossed $22.4 million in the United States and Canada and $8.8 million in other territories, for a worldwide total of $31.2 million, against a production budget of $7.4 million.

In North America, the film was released alongside the openings of Monster Trucks and Sleepless, as well as the wide releases of Silence, Patriots Day, and Live by Night, and was expected to gross around $10 million from 2,220 theaters in its opening weekend. It ended up opening to $13.2 million, finishing above expectations and 4th at the box office.

=== Critical response ===
On review aggregator website Rotten Tomatoes, the film has an approval rating of 18% based on 92 reviews and an average rating of 3.70/10. The site's critical consensus reads, "The Bye Bye Man clumsily mashes together elements from better horror films, adding up to a derivative effort as short on originality as it is on narrative coherency or satisfying scares." On Metacritic, the film has a score of 37 out of 100 based on 22 critics, indicating "generally unfavorable reviews". Audiences polled by CinemaScore gave the film an average grade of "C" on an A+ to F scale.

A. A. Dowd of The A.V. Club said, "on top of the general hoariness, this is also an uncommonly, at times unbelievably inept movie; from its acting to its script to most of its technical aspects, it feels barely fit for the big screen. The Bye Bye Man is so bad, in fact, that it retroactively improves the half-assed Hollywood horror that it’d be lucky to better resemble." Kalyn Corrigan, writing for Bloody Disgusting, said the film had "poorly developed characters", a "muddled mythology", and "horribly shoddy editing", ultimately giving the film a 2/5 rating. Jake Dee for JoBlo.com said "in a room full of 200 or so public patrons, the film drew far more auditory laughs than terrified gasps," and awarded it a 3/10 rating.
