= Stacy Title =

American film director (1964–2021)

- Born: February 21, 1964; New York, U.S.
- Died: January 11, 2021 (aged 56); Los Angeles, California, U.S.
- Occupation(s): Film director, screenwriter, producer
- Known for: Down on the Waterfront; The Last Supper; Let the Devil Wear Black; The Bye Bye Man
- Spouse: Jonathan Penner (m. 1991)
- Children: 2
- Relatives: Jason Alexander (cousin-in-law)

Stacy Title (February 21, 1964 – January 11, 2021) was an American film director, screenwriter and producer. Her films include Let the Devil Wear Black (1999), The Last Supper (1995), and Down on the Waterfront (1993), for which she was nominated for an Academy Award.

== Career ==
Title's first project was Down on the Waterfront (1993), a short film nominated for the Academy Award for Best Live Action Short Film at the 66th Academy Awards. Her first feature film, The Last Supper (1995), is a comedy about graduate students who plan to murder right-wing militants.

Title was married to writer-actor and Survivor contestant Jonathan Penner, with whom she collaborated on several movies. She first directed Penner in The Last Supper. Together, they wrote the script for Let the Devil Wear Black, in which Penner starred. They also collaborated on the 2003 The WB-produced re-imagining of The Lone Ranger, starring Chad Michael Murray and Nathaniel Arcand. She later directed the 2017 horror film The Bye Bye Man, from a script by Penner. She and Penner were previously developing a King Kong television series for MarVista Entertainment and IM Global Television. She was also developing a dark comedy film called Walking Time Bomb following the release of The Bye Bye Man.

== Personal life ==
Title grew up in New York, and her father was a commercial producer. She married Jonathan Penner on September 14, 1991; the couple had two children together. Title was a first cousin of Daena Title, who is married to Seinfeld actor Jason Alexander. Alexander introduced Title and Penner when he was acting with Penner in the film White Palace. Alexander was slated to star in Walking Time Bomb before Title's death.

== Illness and death ==
In December 2017, Title was diagnosed with ALS, though she continued to work on Walking Time Bomb despite her illness and though as her illness progressed she was unable to walk, talk or swallow. The film was never completed.

Title died on January 11, 2021, at the age of 56. Her husband Jonathan Penner announced her death via Twitter.

== Filmography ==
Short film

Year	Title	Director	Producer	Writer
1993	Down on the Waterfront	Yes	Yes	Yes

Feature film

Year	Title	Director	Co-executive producer	Writer
1995	The Last Supper	Yes	Yes	No
1999	Let the Devil Wear Black	Yes	Yes	Yes
2006	Hood of Horror	Yes	No	No
2017	The Bye Bye Man	Yes	No	No

Television

Year	Title	Director	Writer	Executive producer	Notes
2003	The Lone Ranger	No	Yes	Yes	Television film
2007	The Greatest Show Ever	Yes	No	No	Television film
2017	Freakish	Yes	No	No	Episode "Trust Issues"

Documentary appearances

Year	Title	Notes
2006	Survivor: Cook Islands	Episode "Arranging a Hit" (as Jonathan's wife)
2017	Made in Hollywood	Episode "Live by Night/Sleepless/The Bye Bye Man"
2018	This Changes Everything	

Ref.:
