= Survivor: Cagayan =

28th season of the reality television series

- Season 28
- Region 1 DVD cover
- Presented by: Jeff Probst
- No. of days: 39
- No. of castaways: 18
- Winner: Tony Vlachos
- Runner-up: Yung "Woo" Hwang
- Location: Palaui Island, Philippines
- No. of episodes: 14

Release
- Original network: CBS
- Original release: February 26 – May 21, 2014

Additional information
- Filming dates: July 11 – August 18, 2013

Season chronology
- ← Previous; Blood vs. Water Next → San Juan del Sur — Blood vs. Water

Survivor: Cagayan — Brains vs. Brawn vs. Beauty (commonly referred to as Survivor: Cagayan) is the 28th season of the American CBS competitive reality television series Survivor. The season was filmed in Cagayan from July 11 to August 18, 2013, and premiered on February 26, 2014, with a two-hour episode, featuring 18 new players (nine men and nine women), divided into three tribes of six based on their dominant attribute: "Brawn", "Brains" and "Beauty". In the finale, Tony Vlachos was named the Sole Survivor by a vote of 8–1 over Yung "Woo" Hwang.

== Format ==
Survivor is a reality television show based on the Swedish show Expedition Robinson, created by Mark Burnett and Charlie Parsons. The series follows a number of participants isolated in a remote location, where they must provide food, fire, and shelter. One participant is removed from the series by majority vote every three days, with challenges held to give a reward (ranging from living- and food-related prizes to a car) and immunity from being voted out of the series. The last remaining player receives a prize of $1,000,000.

== Contestants ==
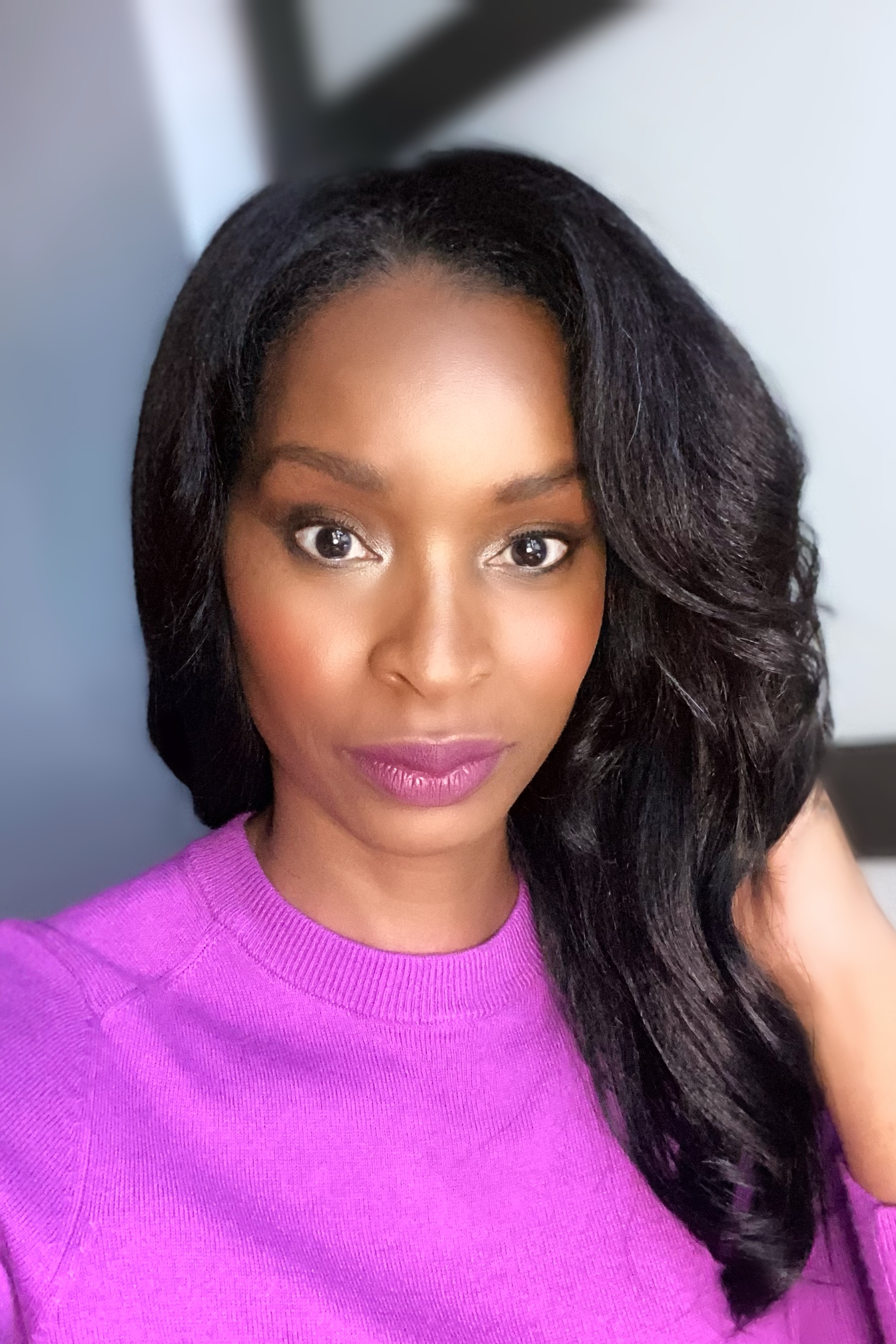
J'Tia Taylor

The cast was composed of 18 new players, initially split into three tribes containing six members each: Aparri ("Brawn"), Luzon ("Brains"), and Solana ("Beauty"). The tribe of Luzon is named after the island in the Philippines, while Aparri and Solana are named after towns in Cagayan. Notable cast included former professional basketball player Cliff Robinson; professional poker player Garrett Adelstein; David Samson, president of Major League Baseball's Miami Marlins; and former Miss Kentucky Teen USA Jefra Bland, who placed in the top 15 at Miss Teen USA 2009.

List of Survivor: Cagayan contestants
Contestant	Age	From	Tribe			Finish	
Contestant	Age	From	Original	Switched	Merged	Placement	Day
David Samson	45	Plantation, Florida	Luzon			1st voted out	Day 3
Garrett Adelstein	27	Santa Monica, California	Luzon			2nd voted out	Day 6
Brice Johnston	27	Philadelphia, Pennsylvania	Solana			3rd voted out	Day 8
J'Tia Taylor	31	Chicago, Illinois	Luzon			4th voted out	Day 11
Cliff Robinson	46	Buffalo, New York	Aparri	Solana		5th voted out	Day 14
Lindsey Ogle	29	Kokomo, Indiana	Aparri	Solana		Quit	Day 14
Alexis Maxwell	21	Addison, Illinois	Solana	Aparri		6th voted out	Day 16
Sarah Lacina	29	Cedar Rapids, Iowa	Aparri	Aparri	Solarrion	7th voted out 1st jury member	Day 19
Morgan McLeod	21	San Jose, California	Solana	Aparri	Solarrion	8th voted out 2nd jury member	Day 22
Leon Joseph "L.J." McKanas	34	Boston, Massachusetts	Solana	Solana	Solarrion	9th voted out 3rd jury member	Day 25
Jeremiah Wood	34	Dobson, North Carolina	Solana	Aparri	Solarrion	10th voted out 4th jury member	Day 28
Jefra Bland	22	Campbellsville, Kentucky	Solana	Solana	Solarrion	11th voted out 5th jury member	Day 30
Latasha "Tasha" Fox	37	St. Louis, Missouri	Luzon	Aparri	Solarrion	12th voted out 6th jury member	Day 33
Trish Hegarty	48	Needham, Massachusetts	Aparri	Solana	Solarrion	13th voted out 7th jury member	Day 36
Spencer Bledsoe	21	Chicago, Illinois	Luzon	Aparri	Solarrion	14th voted out 8th jury member	Day 37
Kassandra "Kass" McQuillen	41	Tehachapi, California	Luzon	Aparri	Solarrion	15th voted out 9th jury member	Day 38
Yung "Woo" Hwang	29	Newport Beach, California	Aparri	Solana	Solarrion	Runner-up	Day 39
Tony Vlachos	39	Jersey City, New Jersey	Aparri	Solana	Solarrion	Sole Survivor	Day 39

=== Future appearances ===
Yung "Woo" Hwang, Kassandra "Kass" McQuillen, Spencer Bledsoe, and Latasha "Tasha" Fox returned for Survivor: Cambodia. Sarah Lacina and Tony Vlachos returned for Survivor: Game Changers and again for Survivor: Winners at War. Vlachos represented USA on Australian Survivor: Australia V The World in 2025.

Outside of Survivor, Hwang competed on the premiere of Candy Crush. In 2022, Lacina and Fox competed on the first season of The Challenge: USA. Trish Hegarty competed on the USA Network reality competition series, Snake in the Grass. In 2023, Lacina competed on The Challenge: World Championship. In 2025, Vlachos competed on the third season of The Traitors.

== Season summary ==
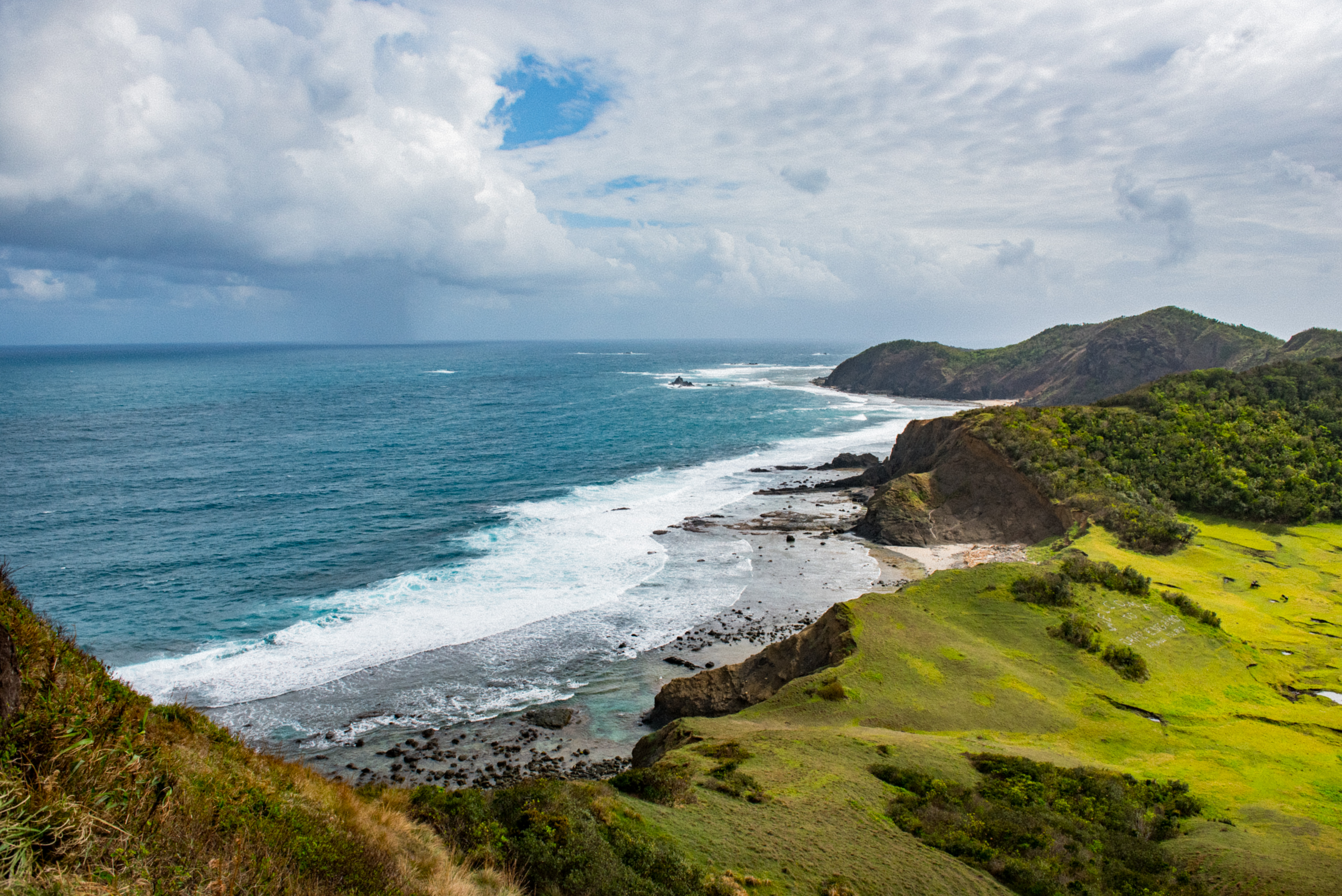
The season filmed in Palaui Island in Cagayan.

The 18 new castaways were divided into three tribes based on primary attribute: Aparri (Brawn), Luzon (Brains), and Solana (Beauty). The Luzon tribe stumbled out of the gate, losing three of the first four immunity challenges and being reduced to only Tasha, Kass, and Spencer. The Solana tribe, led by LJ, only lost one member, Brice, while the Aparri tribe went undefeated in challenges. With 14 players remaining, the castaways were shuffled into two tribes of seven: Aparri, featuring the three Brains, three of the Beauties, and Sarah from the Brawn tribe; and Solana, consisting of Beauties LJ and Jefra, and the other five Brawns. On Solana, the Brawns initially planned to hold strong and get rid of LJ, but he and Jefra convinced Tony and Trish to turn on the Brawn alliance to vote out physical threat Cliff instead. After he was voted out, his ally Lindsey had a fight with Trish, causing her to quit the game.

The tribes merged with 11 players remaining: five from Solana and six from Aparri, becoming Solarrion. While the swapped tribes looked like they were going to stick together, Tony attempted to sway his old ally Sarah back to the Brawn-heavy Solana alliance, but Sarah was indecisive. Instead, Trish persuaded Kass to swap alliances, which she did, eliminating Sarah and putting Solana in power. Despite being in the majority, Tony's paranoia continually got the better of him as he and Woo navigated between alliances to blindside potential threats. Tony also found multiple hidden immunity idols, including a special one that could be used after the votes were read; he also lied about the special idol's "different powers"—falsely insinuating it could be used at the Final Four.

Kass, Tony, and Woo ended up in the Final Three, at which point they learned that one more person would be eliminated before the Final Tribal Council. Woo won the final immunity challenge; but while Kass seemed like an easy choice to take to the end after betraying her initial alliance, Tony convinced Woo to uphold his virtues and honor their bond as tribe-mates throughout the entire game, and Woo took Tony to the Final Two.

At the Final Tribal Council, Woo was lambasted by the jurors for making a poor decision in bringing Tony to the end, with many of the jurors speculating he rode Tony's coattails. Though Tony was praised for his strategic game and his bluff about the super idol's power, he was also criticized for his multiple betrayals, poor social game outside of his alliance, and playing too aggressively. The last speech, from Spencer, compared Woo to Tony's "dog", saying he always followed his master and that Tony deserved to win because of his strategy. Spencer also criticized Woo's final decision. In the end, a majority of the jury decided to award Tony the title of Sole Survivor over Woo.

Challenge winners and eliminations by episode
Episode			Challenge winner(s)		Eliminated	
No.	Title	Original air date	Reward	Immunity	Tribe	Player
1	"Hot Girl With a Grudge"	February 26, 2014	Solana		Luzon	David
1	"Hot Girl With a Grudge"	February 26, 2014	Aparri		Luzon	David
1	"Hot Girl With a Grudge"	February 26, 2014	Aparri		Luzon	Garrett
1	"Hot Girl With a Grudge"	February 26, 2014	Solana		Luzon	Garrett
2	"Cops-R-Us"	March 5, 2014	Aparri		Solana	Brice
2	"Cops-R-Us"	March 5, 2014	Luzon		Solana	Brice
3	"Our Time to Shine"	March 12, 2014	Solana	Solana	Luzon	J'Tia
3	"Our Time to Shine"	March 12, 2014	Aparri	Aparri	Luzon	J'Tia
4	"Odd One Out"	March 19, 2014	Solana	Aparri	Solana	Cliff
5	"We Found Our Zombies"	March 26, 2014	Solana	Solana	Solana	Lindsey
5	"We Found Our Zombies"	March 26, 2014	Solana	Solana	Aparri	Alexis
6	"Head of the Snake"	April 2, 2014	None (Note: There was no reward challenge due to the merge.)	Woo	Solarrion	Sarah
7	"Mad Treasure Hunt"	April 9, 2014	Jefra, Jeremiah, LJ, Morgan, Spencer	Spencer	Solarrion	Morgan
8	"Bag of Tricks"	April 16, 2014	Jeremiah, Spencer, Tony	Tasha	Solarrion	LJ
9	"Sitting In My Spy Shack"	April 23, 2014	Jefra, Jeremiah, Spencer, Tasha	Tasha	Solarrion	Jeremiah
10	"Chaos Is My Friend"	April 30, 2014	Survivor Auction	Tasha	Solarrion	Jefra
11	"Havoc to Wreak"	May 7, 2014	Kass, Spencer, Woo	Spencer	Solarrion	Tasha
12	"Straw That Broke The Camel's Back"	May 14, 2014	Tony [Trish]	Spencer	Solarrion	Trish
13	"It's Do or Die"	May 21, 2014	None	Kass	Solarrion	Spencer
13	"It's Do or Die"	May 21, 2014	None	Woo	Solarrion	Kass
14	"Reunion"	May 21, 2014				

== Episodes ==
No. overall	No. in season	Title	CBS recap	Rating/share (18-49)	Original release date	U.S. viewers (millions)	Weekly rank
412	1	"Hot Girl With a Grudge"	Recap	2.4/7	February 26, 2014	9.40	20
All three tribes were asked to designate a leader. David, Sarah, and LJ were chosen for the Brains, Brawn, and Beauty tribes respectively; they then had to pick their tribe's weakest player as David, Sarah, and LJ respectively chose Garrett, Trish, and Morgan. All three were flown by helicopter to their camps, while the remaining tribe members had to walk there. Upon arriving at camp, the weakest players had to choose between an extra bag of rice for the tribe or a clue to a hidden immunity idol. Garrett and Morgan chose to look for the Idol, but only Garrett found one, while Trish chose the extra bag of rice. Brice began to bond with Morgan after noticing bonds were forming between LJ and Jeremiah, and Alexis and Jefra. At the Brawn camp, Woo recognized Cliff as a basketball star, but the tribe didn't care about Cliff's past. Sarah confronted Tony, as she pegged him as being a cop, but he denied it and claimed to be a construction worker. At the Brains camp, J'Tia was leading the tribe in building their shelter despite coming across as bossy.: Reward/Immunity challenge: The tribes would start at one end of a course with a wagon. Along the way, they would retrieve keys from a tall post with a long pole to unlock three trunks with puzzle pieces inside, and put the trunks on the wagon. After getting all three trunks, the tribes would have to disassemble the wagon and push the pieces of the wagon and the trunks either through or over a fence, then climb over the fence themselves. They then would re-assemble the wagon, put the trunks on board, and drag the wagon through more obstacles. Once at the finish, two tribe members would take the pieces out of the trunks and assemble the vertical puzzle. The first two tribes to finish would get immunity; the first-place tribe would also get a fire-making kit, while second place would get flint to make fire.; At the challenge, the Brawns and the Beauty tribe took a big lead; by the time the Brains tribe began the puzzle, the other tribes were almost finished. The Beauty tribe finished first with the Brawn tribe coming in second. At the Brains camp, Kass and David debated over whom to vote out: Kass wanted J'Tia out for her poor attitude and work ethic, while David wanted to target Garrett, who he saw as a threat later in the game. Garrett was conflicted between voting for J'Tia and David after being selected by David as the weakest tribe member. J'Tia and Tasha agreed to Garrett's plan, but Spencer was paranoid about David potentially having an idol and believed J'Tia was the easier vote. In the end, Spencer sided with Garrett and David was voted out. After the vote, Kass found herself in a swing vote position, sitting between Spencer and Garrett, and J'Tia and Tasha, eventually allying with the former. At the Brawn camp, Cliff and Woo bonded, while Tony wasn't fond of Cliff's popularity within the tribe. Trish and Lindsey argued over workload. Tony built a hiding spot in the shelter, named the "Spy Shack," to eavesdrop on his tribe's conversations. At the Beauty camp, Jeremiah and Morgan bonded, while Brice attempted to solidify an alliance with them.: Reward/Immunity challenge: The tribes would race out into the ocean and climb over and into a bamboo cage. The tribe would then have to untie an underwater door on the cage bottom and drag heavy fish traps through the door and back to the beach. Once on the beach, they must retrieve puzzle pieces inside the fish traps. After that, one member from each tribe must assemble a rotating fish themed gear puzzle. The first two tribes to finish would get immunity; the first-place tribe would receive a deluxe fishing kit, including nets, lures, worms, along with a pan and spices, while second place would receive fish lures, weights, and line.; At the challenge, the Brawn and Brains tribes took an early lead over the Beauty tribe. The Brawn tribe placed first while J'Tia of the Brains tribe struggled with the puzzle. The Beauty tribe managed to come from behind and place second, thanks to LJ's work on the puzzle, sending the Brains to their second consecutive Tribal Council. After the challenge, Tony found a clue to the hidden immunity idol in the reward and ended up finding the idol. At the Brains camp, Garrett, not wanting anyone to have private talks with each other, began an open discussion with the tribe on whom to send home as he, Kass, and Spencer had agreed on voting out J'Tia. Tasha argued with Garrett, as she wanted to strategize and believed Garrett was not playing the game correctly. When Tasha attempted to privately talk with Kass about voting out Garrett, Garrett and Spencer followed them. With her tribe distracted, J'Tia dumped most of their rice into the fire due to being angry about her tribe wanting to vote her out. At Tribal Council, Garrett got into an argument with J'Tia and Tasha, and outed his alliance with Spencer and Kass. In the end, Kass flipped, siding with the other women to vote out Garrett, who had left his hidden idol back at camp.
413	2	"Cops-R-Us"	Recap	2.4/8	March 5, 2014	9.58	18
Spencer questioned the rest of his tribe if J'Tia would have been voted out if Garrett had not had an open discussion about the vote. Tasha said she planned to vote for J'Tia until Garrett revealed his alliance that didn't involve her. At the Brawn camp, Tony admitted to Sarah that he's a police officer, which she earlier suspected and he denied. The two formed an alliance, naming it "Cops-R-Us." Tony lied to Sarah, claiming that Cliff and Lindsey suggested an interest in getting Sarah out of the game. A rain storm came down on the castaways throughout the night and following day. At the Beauty camp, LJ ventured off during the storm in search of the hidden immunity idol and eventually found it. At the Brains camp, they all practiced throwing water to each other from coconut-to-coconut based on their challenge clue.: Reward/Immunity challenge: One tribe member closest to the ocean would collect a bucket of water. They then had to work with their tribe to pass the water to each other by throwing it in the air and catching it in their buckets, with the final member eventually dumping the remaining water into a container which, when filled, would drop and release a ball. Two tribe members would then use the ball to complete a circular maze with the winning tribe receiving a tarp and other comfort items along with immunity while the second place tribe would receive immunity and a tarp.; The Brawn tribe finished first with the Brains tribe coming in second. At the Brawn tribe, Tony found a clue in their reward to the hidden immunity idol and hid it, as he already had found the idol. The Beauty tribe began looking to Tribal Council as LJ asked the tribe if anybody wanted to go home, but received no responses. The alliance of LJ, Jeremiah, Jefra, and Alexis decided to split the vote between Brice and Morgan in case of a hidden immunity idol, while the two outsiders attempted to sway Jeremiah into voting with them for Alexis. At Tribal Council, Jeremiah stayed loyal to LJ, forcing a three-way tie between Morgan, Brice, and Alexis. On the revote, Brice was unanimously eliminated.
414	3	"Our Time to Shine"	Recap	2.5/8	March 12, 2014	9.66	16
After returning from Tribal Council, Morgan approached Jeremiah in front of the entire tribe to question his reason for voting with LJ, Alexis, and Jefra rather than siding with herself and Brice. Jeremiah defended himself saying that his first alliance was with LJ, Alexis, and Jefra, and he felt Brice was too much of a social threat. Morgan worked on convincing Jefra and Alexis that Jeremiah had actually been the one organizing the vote for Alexis. Back at the Brains' camp, they again practiced for a challenge based on the clue they received in tree-mail.: Reward challenge: One member of each tribe would act as a caller while two other blindfolded tribe members would navigate the course to retrieve five items and a flag, eventually working with a third blindfolded tribemate to hoist the items up to the caller's platform. The winning tribe would receive three egg-laying hens and a rooster, while the second-place tribe would receive a dozen eggs.; Throughout the challenge, the Beauty and Brains tribes were neck-and-neck while Brawn constantly trailed. However, after the Beauty tribe won the challenge, J'Tia of the Brains struggled with hoisting the last item, a flag, resulting in the Brawn tribe catching up and eventually placing second. At the Beauty camp, Jeremiah pulled out a note from their reward in front of the tribe, a hidden immunity idol clue which he read out loud. He proceeded to kill the rooster for the tribe to eat by ripping its head off. At the Brawn's camp, Sarah conspired to get Cliff out of the game due to Tony's lie to Sarah about Cliff targeting her, convincing Woo and Trish to throw the upcoming immunity challenge to do so.: Immunity challenge: All tribe members would take turns diving into the water to retrieve buoys. Once all five are collected, tribe members must throw them into a basket floating in the water. Two tribe members would stay in the water to retrieve any buoys that miss the basket; the person throwing could not throw until they had all un-scored buoys on their platform.; The Beauty tribe came in first place. Despite the attempts of several Brawn tribemates to throw the challenge, they finished again in second place, sending the Brains tribe back to Tribal Council. Kass and Tasha weighed their options and considered whether they would vote for Spencer, who was outside their women's alliance but their best challenge competitor, or J'Tia, who was in their alliance but also a challenge liability who had dumped their rice in a prior fit of rage. In the end, Kass and Tasha sided with Spencer, voting J'Tia out.
415	4	"Odd One Out"	Recap	2.5/8	March 19, 2014	9.46	14
The Brains tribe comes back to camp pleased with their decision to vote out J'Tia at Tribal Council. The next day, the tree mail suggested a reward challenge for food. When the tribes arrived to the challenge, host Jeff Probst told the castaways to drop their buffs, as the three tribes were being redistributed into two tribes. The entire "Brawn" tribe, with the exception of Sarah, joined two "Beauty" members, LJ and Jefra, to make up the new Solana tribe. Sarah would be joined by the three remaining "Brains" (Kass, Spencer, Tasha) and the remaining "Beauty" members (Jeremiah, Alexis, Morgan) to make up the new Aparri tribe.: Reward challenge: One member of each tribe would hang on to a post. Two members of the opposing tribe would attempt to remove them from the post and drag them across the sand to the finish line. The first tribe to get the member of the other tribe across the finish line would receive one point. The first tribe to score two points wins coffee and pastries.; The new Solana tribe won the challenge 2–1 after Cliff proved too heavy for Spencer and Jeremiah to shift. Back at the Solana camp, LJ and Trish formed a bond after both found out they were from Massachusetts. This led to the chagrin of her fellow "Brawn" allies, who were concerned that Trish would abandon their alliance. Meanwhile, at Aparri, the former Brains tribe found themselves in a power position after Alexis, Morgan, and Jeremiah each sought out their own new alliance of four with them.: Immunity challenge: Each tribe uses a puzzle log to break through two wooden walls; then, they must turn, pull and push the puzzle log to navigate a maze that is worked into the surface of the log. Once the log is cleared from the maze station, the first tribe to hit a gong at the end of the course wins immunity.; At the immunity challenge, the Aparri members overcame Solana's early lead to win immunity. While most of the original Brawn tribe wanted to vote out LJ, Trish decided to join LJ and Jefra in voting out Cliff. She encouraged Tony to join her newly formed alliance and eliminate former NBA player and potential post-merge challenge threat Cliff, though Tony appeared hesitant. LJ was prepared to play his hidden immunity idol, but chose not to do so. In the end, his idol wasn't needed after Tony and Trish joined him and Jefra, forming a majority and eliminating Cliff, much to Lindsey and Woo's surprise.
416	5	"We Found Our Zombies"	Recap	2.3/7	March 26, 2014	9.85	12
After Tribal Council, Trish approached Lindsey to explain why she flipped from their alliance. The two instead engaged in a heated argument, resulting in Lindsey walking away from camp. Jeff met up with Lindsey and she informed him that she was pulling herself from the game fearing that, if she stayed any longer, she might do something that she wouldn't want her child to see. Soon after, Jeff stopped by Solana's camp to inform the tribe of Lindsey's decision to leave.: Reward challenge: Facing off one against one in a fenced off circle, a castaway from each tribe would hold a wooden idol on top of a platform that they would hold in one hand. They would use the other free hand to attempt to knock their opponent's idol off the platform. The castaway whose idol hit the ground last would score one point for their tribe. First tribe to four points would get to raid the other tribe's camp.; The Solana tribe won the reward challenge and selected Tony and Woo to go to the Aparri camp and pick two items they'd like to take. Tony and Woo opened two notes given to them at the challenge: one informing them of the items they could choose from and the second being a clue to the hidden immunity idol at their own camp. Instead, Tony pretended they were given a clue to assign to a member of the Aparri tribe, giving it to Jeremiah in an attempt to make him a target. Jeremiah later realized that the clue was the same one he had received while on the original Solana tribe and therefore useless to him at Aparri, though Spencer and Alexis appeared skeptical about that claim.: Immunity challenge: Each tribe would build a staircase out of wooden poles, then climb it to reach a bamboo maze. Upon exiting the maze and sliding down a bamboo slide, one tribe member would maneuver a key through a rope obstacle, using the key to unlock a machete to release puzzle pieces. Two more tribe members would then solve a puzzle to reveal the solution to a combination lock. The first tribe to unlock their flag would win immunity.; Despite quickly falling behind on the staircase portion, the Solana tribe came out victorious due to LJ's and Woo's puzzle-solving skills, and won immunity. At the Aparri camp, Alexis attempted to convince the rest of the tribe to vote out Jeremiah, believing him to be the most likely person to turn against them after the merge. Spencer saw through Alexis's scheming and felt she came across as fake, along with the worry that Alexis would rejoin former Beauty allies LJ and Jefra at the merge. At Tribal Council, it was discussed that tribal cohesion was necessary in order to win challenges, which brought up past conflict between Jeremiah and Morgan. Ultimately, Jeremiah was spared over Alexis, who was voted out unanimously.
417	6	"Head of the Snake"	Recap	2.3/7	April 2, 2014	9.48	17
On Day 17, both tribes were anticipating a merge. Their assumptions proved correct after tree mail instructed the former Solana tribe to move to the Aparri beach. Upon arrival, the merge was confirmed and they were informed of a new hidden immunity idol with unspecified "different powers." With the new tribe totaling 11 members, each former tribe attempted to solidify their numbers ahead of the first individual immunity challenge. Despite some tension between Kass and Sarah, the former Aparri tribe had a one-member numerical advantage, so Tony attempted to get his former Brawn ally Sarah to flip to the Solana alliance.: Immunity challenge: The castaways would stand barefoot on wooden slats on an a-frame that was floating in the water and try to remain balanced. After 15 minutes, the castaways would move up to a second set of slats, closer together. After another 15 minutes, the castaways would move to the top of the a-frame where they would have to balance until one person remained, who would then win immunity.; Woo held out against Tony to win immunity. Sarah decided to remain loyal to the former Aparri tribe, but encouraged her allies to vote for Tony. When questioned by Tony about her allegiances, Sarah remained non-committal and he realized she would not turn to their side. Instead, Trish—who had overheard an argument between Sarah and Kass—questioned Kass about her role in the alliance and asked who from the former Aparri she would most likely vote for. When she answered with Sarah, Trish told her that the former Solana tribe would vote for Sarah per Kass' request, leaving the option for Kass to vote with them on the table. At Tribal Council, Tony revealed his hidden immunity idol and announced that it was a "community idol" to help any member of his alliance. Spencer then publicly announced for the Aparri alliance to switch their votes to "the other one." Thinking that "the other one" was LJ, Tony played his idol on him. LJ repaid the favor by playing his own idol on Tony, ensuring that both men were safe from the vote. "The other one" turned out to be Jefra, wasting both idols. However, Kass ended up turning on the Aparri alliance to send Sarah to the jury. In the resulting fallout, Spencer openly stated that Kass had "zero chance of winning the game."
418	7	"Mad Treasure Hunt"	Recap	2.4/7	April 9, 2014	9.62	14
After Tribal Council, Spencer expressed his resentment towards Kass for voting against their alliance, though Kass remained pleased with her decision. The next day, tension grew after Kass called Morgan out for being lazy and spending all day laying in the shelter instead of contributing around camp.: Reward challenge: Divided into two teams of five, the castaways would jump off a platform into the water and navigate a teeter-totter and balance beam. Once on land, the teams would untie knots on a treasure chest and then carry it to a tower, climb up the tower individually and pull the chest up. Two members from each team would then solve a puzzle. The first team to solve the puzzle would be taken to an Outback Steakhouse and enjoy a feast including steak, baked potatoes, and s'mores.; The team of Jefra, Jeremiah, LJ, Morgan, and Spencer won the reward challenge. During their reward, Spencer found a clue to a hidden immunity idol in his napkin and slipped it into his pocket without anyone noticing. Back at camp, Spencer went off in the rain to read his clue and look for the idol, only to be followed by Woo. After the two met up and Spencer began walking away, Woo picked up the pants Spencer had left behind and discovered his idol clue when it fell out of the pants. Woo ran back to camp with the clue and informed everyone about Spencer's discovery, prompting everyone to begin searching for the idol. Eventually, Spencer found the idol when Kass—who was supposed to be watching him—briefly turned her back. Upon reading the sheet of parchment that came with the idol, Spencer learned that it was not the idol with "different powers" mentioned in the merge feast announcement.: Immunity challenge: Castaways would stand on a wooden frame, balancing a block between their head and the top of the frame without the assistance of their hands. The last contestant with their block remaining would win immunity.; After approximately an hour and a half, Spencer outlasted Tasha to win immunity. Back at camp, Spencer attempted to convince Kass to flip back over to their alliance and vote out Tony. The new Solana alliance planned to target Morgan, feeling that she was too lazy around camp and if anyone had found an idol, they would not give it to her. At Tribal Council, Jeff made note of Kass' unpredictability, leading to both alliances feeling uneasy. In the end, Kass stuck with her new alliance and Morgan was voted out.
419	8	"Bag of Tricks"	Recap	2.3/8	April 16, 2014	9.35	10
After receiving four votes at the previous Tribal Council, Tony went into a tirade upon returning to camp. Even though he was in the majority alliance, he was concerned that he might be the next to go for being perceived as a threat. Tony decided to shift the target onto his ally LJ by trying to get LJ to break the alliance's final six deal, telling LJ that he was concerned about the possibility of Woo having a hidden immunity idol. Once LJ proposed blindsiding Woo to mitigate Tony's paranoia, Tony had the leverage he needed to try to send LJ out of the game.: Reward challenge: Divided into three teams of three, the castaways would release twenty sandbags and toss them through a net tube. Once the sandbags have been manipulated through the tube, one castaway would toss them onto a trampoline toward five targets. The first team to land a sandbag in every target wins a trip to a spa with massages, showers, and food.; Tony, Spencer, and Jeremiah won the reward challenge. At the spa, Tony told Spencer and Jeremiah that things in his alliance were not as tight as they seemed, and offered them both the opportunity for them to all work together in the future. Tony then promised Spencer and Jeremiah protection at the next Tribal Council. Back at camp, LJ, Trish, and Jefra discussed Tony's increasing paranoia. Tasha tried to talk strategy with LJ, but LJ didn't feel he could benefit from Tasha's help and ignored her request to go for a walk.: Immunity challenge: The castaways would test their memory by having to memorize a series of colored tiles shown by Jeff. The castaways would have to show back the tiles in order. If they showed the wrong color, they would be out of the challenge. The last castaway to show all of the correct tiles would win immunity.; Tasha's memory proved strongest, winning the immunity challenge. LJ proposed splitting the vote between Spencer and Jeremiah to his alliance in case of a hidden idol. Tony, however, decided to make his move against LJ by telling people about LJ's plot to vote Woo out, although Trish was conflicted after LJ told her a similar story about Tony earlier on, and tried to convince Tony to hold off on his plans. At Tribal Council, there was talk of the need to play an individual game. In the end, Tony and Woo betrayed their old alliance, voting with Spencer, Jeremiah, and Tasha to send LJ to the jury.
420	9	"Sitting In My Spy Shack"	Recap	2.3/7	April 23, 2014	9.43	13
After Tribal Council, a blindsided Jefra confronted Tony and Woo about their betrayal of LJ, and questioned her standing within their alliance. Jefra voiced her concern to Trish about her distrust of Tony but, unbeknownst to them, Tony was hiding in nearby bushes listening in.: Reward challenge: Divided into two teams of four, the castaways would race out in a boat to collect paddles, tied to crates in the water. After returning the boat to shore, two members per team would solve a word puzzle using letters written on the oars of the paddles. The first team to assemble the paddles to reveal the correct phrase would win a trip to Callao Cave, where they would have a barbecue lunch.; Although they were slightly behind after the paddling portion, the team of Jefra, Jeremiah, Spencer, and Tasha won reward after the latter two solved the puzzle. Back at camp, the losing team noted that Jefra was the only one of their alliance on the reward, and worried that she would flip on them after her reaction to LJ's elimination. Despite Tony's attempts to strategize, Trish and Woo went to gather food. After climbing up a large papaya tree, Woo fell out of the tree but was mostly unharmed, save for a bruised tailbone. At Callao Cave, Jeremiah, Spencer, and Tasha tried to convince Jefra to align with them. The four were given a surprise reward of letters from home; Jefra's letter from her mom reminded her to not let her emotions and kindness rule her, and she agreed to align with the minority alliance.: Immunity challenge: The contestants would stand on a beam while balancing a ball on a pole. After 10 minutes, the remaining contestants would move their feet to a narrower section and hands lower down the pole. After another 10 minutes, those still in the challenge would move to the narrowest section with their hands at the bottom section of the pole. The last castaway with their ball still balanced on the pole would win immunity.; In the third stage of the challenge, Tasha outlasted Spencer and Woo to win her second consecutive individual immunity. After the immunity challenge, a paranoid Tony ransacked the forest to find another hidden immunity idol, which he eventually found under a large tree. Upon uncovering it, he discovered that it was the idol with "different powers," with the ability to be played after the votes are read. Trish and her alliance attempted to console Jefra and stop her from flipping. Their attempt was successful, and Jefra confessed to Jeremiah that she was not going to be voting with them. Spencer told Tasha and Jeremiah that he had a hidden idol, and they decided to vote against Woo. At Tribal Council, Spencer played his idol on himself, but it was all for naught as the majority alliance targeted Jeremiah, sending him to the jury.
421	10	"Chaos Is My Friend"	Recap	2.3/7	April 30, 2014	9.70	14
Upon returning to camp, Kass told Spencer that she knew he had a hidden immunity idol because of how he had acted towards her. The next day, the tribe received their money for a Survivor Auction.: Survivor Auction: Trish first bought a movie-style meal of popcorn, candy, and a soft drink, and then later bought a covered item that turned out to be a simple bowl of rice and glass of water. Kass, for the minimum price of $20, bought a steak sandwich. Woo, for $40, bought a plate of ribs in barbecue sauce. Jefra bought a Quesadilla with guacamole and a margarita. Spencer and Tony both spent $500 on a potential advantage in the game, and drew between a white rock and a black rock, with the black rock determining who would get the advantage. Tony drew the black rock. Tasha ultimately spent no money.; Tony's advantage, rather than an advantage in the immunity challenge as expected, instead turned out to be a clue for another regular hidden immunity idol, which he later found and showed to his alliance. Meanwhile, Tasha spent time with the three other remaining women on the tribe, as Spencer put into Tony's head the idea that the women may form an all-woman alliance and pick the guys off, also mentioning that Jefra tried to blindside Tony in the last vote.: Immunity challenge: The castaways had to dig in a circle of sand until they found a rope, which ran underground and was tied to five bags. Once the castaways pulled all five bags up and out of the ground, they had to untie the bags, each releasing one ball. They would then have to maneuver the balls, one at a time, down a small maze and navigate them into five holes. The first castaway to land all five balls won immunity.; Tasha narrowly defeated Woo to win her third consecutive immunity challenge. Afterwards, the majority alliance solidified a plan to vote Spencer out. However, Tony explored a different option and discussed voting Jefra out with Woo and then Spencer, feeling it would be the better option as to avoid an all-woman alliance. Spencer explained the plan to Tasha, who agreed to vote with them. Tony became nervous when Spencer continued looking for a hidden immunity idol. Spencer outed Jefra at Tribal Council for her wanting to flip on Tony before the previous vote, which she admitted to. In the end, Tony and Woo sided with Spencer and Tasha to send Jefra, the last Beauty remaining, to the jury.
422	11	"Havoc to Wreak"	Recap	2.4/8	May 7, 2014	9.91	12
The morning after Tribal Council while the men were talking about Tony's career as a police officer, Tony commented about how Kass may not be feeling well since she was sleeping in. Kass—who was actually awake—misheard him and believed that he was saying bad things about her, leading to a confrontation between the two. In the heat of their argument, Tony dared Kass to vote for him at the next Tribal Council, admitting that he had a special hidden immunity idol, and threatened that Kass would go home if she wrote his name down.: Reward challenge: The castaways were split into two teams of three, and would take turns throwing sandbags at a wall of wooden blocks that formed a puzzle, and when one puzzle was completely knocked down, the two teams would switch and begin rebuilding their respective puzzles. The first team to finish their puzzle would serve as Survivor ambassadors and deliver school supplies to a local school, followed by a meal of burgers and hot dogs.; The team of Spencer, Kass, and Woo initially fell behind, but Spencer managed to pull ahead with Kass's help and win the reward. During the lunch, Spencer brought up the possibility of voting for Tony. Kass agreed with the idea, but Woo appeared reluctant. After returning to camp, Spencer relayed the plan to Tasha of Spencer, Tasha, Woo, and Kass splitting their four votes between Tony and Trish, voting out Trish if Tony played his idol. Meanwhile, Woo lied to Tony that Spencer and Kass, while on reward, agreed on voting out Tasha. Tony seemed skeptical due to Spencer and Tasha's alliance and subsequently believed that Woo was lying to him in preparation for a blindside.: Immunity challenge: The castaways would have to count various items at each of six different tables, and then input those numbers into a combination lock to unlock a metal rod, which they would use to smash a tile. The first castaway to unlock their rod and smash their tile would win immunity.; Spencer won immunity, ending Tasha's winning streak. Back at camp, the four dissenters further elaborated their split-vote plan, with Spencer and Woo planning to vote for Tony, while Tasha and Kass would vote for Trish. Spencer, doubting Tony's claim that he had a special idol, said that if Tony didn't play his idol, they would vote for Tony on the revote. Kass began considering whether or not Tony's erratic behavior could make him a good person to bring to the finals, believing he may receive no votes because of his bad reputation. At Tribal Council, despite taunting from Kass and Spencer, Tony ultimately did not play either of his idols while Kass and Woo stayed with Tony and Trish, voting out Tasha and sending her to the jury.
423	12	"Straw That Broke The Camel's Back"	Recap	2.6/9	May 14, 2014	9.93	12
The morning after Tribal Council, with Spencer now the sole member of his alliance remaining, Tony informed Woo that he planned on taking Woo and Kass to the final three, believing that Kass would get no votes from the jury. Later, Tony went on a walk with Kass, telling her that Woo told him about Kass's plan to blindside Tony, but forgave her and promised her that he would take her and Trish to the final three. Kass returned to camp to tell Woo, angering Tony and causing Woo to doubt where he stands with Tony.: Reward challenge: The five castaways would have to repeatedly roll around in a mud pit, then scrape all of the mud off of their bodies and into a bucket, though they were not allowed to carry it. The castaway with the heaviest bucket would win pizza and soft drinks delivered to them at camp.; Tony won the challenge, with his bucket fully overflowing with mud and chose Trish to share the reward with him. While the two of them ate, Spencer, Kass, and Woo once again began planning to vote out either Tony and Trish, saying that the pair was inseparable. Woo seemed more willing to go along with this plan due to his new distrust of Tony. Kass stated that she would prefer to vote out Trish due to her loyalty to Tony, calling Trish a "goat," a comment Trish heard from the other side of camp.: Immunity challenge: The castaways would have to unbraid three ropes to release a key, which they would then use to unlock a chest full of ladder rungs. They would then build a ladder up to the second level, where they had to fit a series of boards onto the correct pegs in order to build a staircase to the third and final level. There, the castaways had to solve a slide puzzle depicting the season's logo. The first castaway to solve the puzzle would win immunity.; Although Tony had a large lead in the building portion of the challenge, Spencer caught up and passed Tony on the puzzle, winning immunity and foiling the alliance's plan to take him out. Back at camp, with tensions already high, Trish yelled at Kass for calling her a goat, and also for her tendency to get into fights with everyone, only to play the victim afterwards. The argument continued at Tribal Council. Tony revealed both idols, wearing the "special idol"—falsely insinuating it can still be played at the next Tribal Council—and using the regular idol on himself before the votes were read. Ultimately, Trish was unanimously sent to the jury.
424	13	"It's Do or Die"	Recap	2.6/8	May 21, 2014	9.58	8
The final four returned to camp after voting Trish out, with Tony explaining that his vote for Trish was purely strategic, but admitted he was sad to get rid of his closest ally. Tony continued his bluff that his special idol guaranteed him a spot in the final three, but Kass was doubtful about its purported rules. The next morning, the final four castaways were given a feast and visited by their loved ones: Kass' husband, Woo's cousin Mikey, Spencer's sister Taryn, and Tony's best friend Arnold. Arnold explained that Tony's wife, his original loved one choice, decided to stay home with their four-month-old daughter, which led to Tony crying over missing his family.: Immunity challenge: The castaways would stand on a pole in the water, lowering a bucket to get water to fill a bamboo chute, which would raise a key. Upon retrieving the key, the castaway would swim back to shore and unlock puzzle pieces. The first castaway to solve the puzzle would win immunity.; Despite being the last person to release their key, Kass made a huge comeback on the puzzle portion to win immunity. Knowing he was likely the target, Spencer told Tony that he believed that there would be two finalists instead of three, and that Tony would likely be voted out by Kass or Woo if either won the final challenge. At Tribal Council, Spencer pled his case but it fell on deaf ears as he was voted out, with Tony revealing that his special idol had already expired. Host Jeff Probst revealed that Spencer was correct in assuming that there would be a final two before sending the final three back to camp. Upon returning to camp, Kass and Woo agreed that Tony could beat either of them at the Final Tribal Council, and vowed to take each other to the end if Tony lost the final challenge.: Immunity challenge: The castaways would navigate a massive maze filled with turnstiles—some working, some not—to retrieve four medallions. The four medallions would open a chest filled with cogs. The first castaway to correctly arrange the cogs and raise a flag would win immunity and a guaranteed spot at the final Tribal Council.; Kass and Woo were neck-and-neck in assembling their cogs, but Woo barely edged Kass out to win, earning the sole vote at that night's Tribal Council. Tony attempted to appeal to Woo's values of honor, loyalty, and integrity, telling Woo that eliminating him—an ally of his since the start of the game—would invalidate those values. Kass stressed her unlikeliness to win in urging Woo to honor their pact made the previous night. She claimed that Tony would just put a spin on things, by telling the jury that he did all the work while Woo was just his sidekick. At Tribal Council, Woo decided to uphold his values and made Kass the final member of the jury. At the Final Tribal Council, Woo's decision to take Tony to the end was constantly questioned by some of the jurors, while Tony was repeatedly berated for his multiple betrayals throughout the game. To conclude the night, Spencer spoke to the jury in defense of Tony's ferocity, incessant idol-hunting, and voting decisions, and pleaded to his fellow jurors to vote for Tony over Woo.
425	14	"Reunion"	N/A	1.9/6	May 21, 2014	7.14	14
Months later, when the votes were read, it was revealed that the jury awarded Tony the victory with eight of the nine votes, with only Tasha voting for Woo to win. Probst also confirmed Woo's million dollar mistake when he asked the jury members (including Tony) who they would have voted for between Kass and Woo, with 8 of 9 raising their hand for Woo. Another controversy came from Tyler Perry who wanted either Spencer or Tasha to find his idol before Tony found it.

== Voting history ==
	Original tribes					Switched tribes			Merged tribe								
Episode	1		2		3	4	5		6	7	8	9	10	11	12	13	
Day	3	6	8		11	14		16	19	22	25	28	30	33	36	37	38
Tribe	Luzon	Luzon	Solana		Luzon	Solana	Solana	Aparri	Solarrion	Solarrion	Solarrion	Solarrion	Solarrion	Solarrion	Solarrion	Solarrion	Solarrion
Eliminated	David	Garrett	Tie (Note: The first Tribal Council vote resulted in a tie. Per the rules, a second vote was held where the castaways involved in the tie would not vote and the remaining castaways could only vote for those who tied.)	Brice	J'Tia	Cliff	Lindsey	Alexis	Sarah	Morgan	LJ	Jeremiah	Jefra	Tasha	Trish	Spencer	Kass
Votes	4–2	3–2	2–2–2	3–0–0	3–1	4–3	Quit (Note: No vote: Lindsey chose to quit the game.)	6–1	6–5	6–4	5–3–1	5–3	4–3	4–1–1	4–1	3–1	1–0
Voter	Vote																
Tony						Cliff			Sarah	Morgan	LJ	Jeremiah	Jefra	Tasha	Trish	Spencer	None (Note: Kass and Tony were not eligible to vote as the only eligible players they could vote for were each other.)
Woo						LJ			Sarah	Morgan	LJ	Jeremiah	Jefra	Tasha	Trish	Spencer	Kass
Kass	J'Tia	Garrett			J'Tia			Alexis	Sarah	Morgan	Jeremiah	Jeremiah	Spencer	Tasha	Trish	Spencer	None
Spencer	David	J'Tia			J'Tia			Alexis	Jefra	Tony	LJ	Woo	Jefra	Tony	Trish	Woo	
Trish						Cliff			Sarah	Morgan	Jeremiah	Jeremiah	Spencer	Tasha	Kass		
Tasha	David	Garrett			J'Tia			Alexis	Jefra	Tony	LJ	Woo	Jefra	Trish			
Jefra			Brice	Brice		Cliff			Sarah	Morgan	Jeremiah	Jeremiah	Spencer				
Jeremiah			Morgan	Brice				Alexis	Jefra	Tony	LJ	Woo					
LJ			Morgan	Brice		Cliff			Sarah	Morgan	Spencer						
Morgan			Alexis	None (Note: This player was not eligible to vote in the second round of voting.)				Alexis	Jefra	Tony							
Sarah								Alexis	Jefra								
Alexis			Brice	None				Jeremiah									
Lindsey						LJ	Quit										
Cliff						LJ											
J'Tia	David	Garrett			Spencer												
Brice			Alexis	None													
Garrett	David	J'Tia															
David	J'Tia																

Jury vote
Episode	14	
Day	39	
Finalist	Tony	Woo
Votes	8–1	
Juror	Vote	
Kass	Yes	
Spencer	Yes	
Trish	Yes	
Tasha		Yes
Jefra	Yes	
Jeremiah	Yes	
LJ	Yes	
Morgan	Yes	
Sarah	Yes	

== Production ==
Cagayan was the fourth consecutive season to be filmed in the Philippines, making it the second most-used country for filming as of 2014, tied with Samoa. This season features the return of a special hidden immunity idol that can be used at Tribal Council after the votes have been read (similar to Survivor: Panama and Survivor: Cook Islands), which was hidden once the tribes merged, except this idol came without a clue. This is in addition to hidden immunity idols that must be played after the votes are cast but before they are read, as seen in Survivor: Fiji onward. This is also the first time in ten seasons, since Survivor: Tocantins, to feature two finalists, instead of three, facing the jury vote for the winner.

== Reception ==
=== Ratings ===
Survivor: Cagayan's premiere episode on February 26, 2014, drew in 9.4 million viewers and a 2.4 rating. Viewership was up substantially from the 8.9 million viewers of the premiere for Survivor: Caramoan, the previous winter premiere, which was the series' weakest. However, the 18-49 rating was on par with Caramoan's 2.4 rating.

In its third episode, Survivor: Cagayan gained higher ratings and brought in more viewers in the 18–49 adult demographic than time-slot rival American Idol for the first time in the series' history; the episode put up 2.5/8 ratings share with 9.86 million viewers, while Idol received a ratings share of 2.4/8 and had 9.57 million viewers. This trend continued the following episode as well, this time with a rating three-tenths of a point higher than Idol.

=== Critical reception ===
The season received universal acclaim from both critics and fans, some calling it the best season since the show's early days. Consistent praise has gone to the theme of Brawn vs. Brains vs. Beauty, the exciting challenges, and the strong cast overall. Survivor: Caramoan winner John Cochran called it one of the show's best seasons, and had particular praise for the season's final six contestants, calling it the best final six in the show's history. Even host Jeff Probst, during the live reunion show, called it not only one of the best seasons, but also one of the best casts in the show's history.

Entertainment Weekly ranked it as the fourth best season of all time, behind Borneo and Micronesia (tied for first) and Heroes vs. Villains, calling it the best season with entirely new players since the very first one, and even then admitting that Borneo was only better simply by being the first. Cagayan was similarly ranked third, behind Heroes vs. Villains and Borneo, by Examiner.com, which similarly called it the best season with an entirely new cast since the original. Cagayan was ranked #1 by Survivor fan site "Survivor Oz" in its 2014 rankings of all seasons of the series, and was ranked #2 by the same list a year later. It was also ranked as the fourth-best season by "The Purple Rock Podcast." In 2020, Inside Survivor ranked this season as the show's third-best out of the first 40 saying that "Cagayan never takes its foot off the gas and is chock full of memorable characters, exciting gameplay, and iconic moments. It's a season that shows that all-new casts can still deliver and that the show doesn't have to constantly rely on returning players."

However, one criticism against the season was the inclusion of the Super Immunity Idol at the request of Hollywood notable Tyler Perry, which was panned by many fans, including former castaway Rob Cesternino from Survivor: The Amazon and Survivor: All-Stars. Nevertheless, a poll on Cesternino's podcast Rob Has a Podcast a year later saw Cagayan ranked as the third-greatest season of the series, only behind Heroes vs. Villains and Survivor: Pearl Islands, while Cesternino himself personally ranked it as the fourth-greatest. This was updated in 2021 during Cesternino's podcast, Survivor All-Time Top 40 Rankings, ranking 2nd out of 40th. In 2024, Nick Caruso of TVLine ranked this season 4th out of 47.

In the official CBS Watch issue commemorating the 15th anniversary of Survivor, Cagayan was voted by viewers as the fifth greatest season of the series, and was the only post-Heroes vs. Villains season to appear in the top ten. In a different poll for the same magazine, Tony was voted as the eighth greatest player in Survivor history for his performance in Cagayan. Lastly, LJ and Woo were respectively ranked fourth and fifth in the same magazine's poll for the "Hottest Male Castaway," while Morgan ranked third in the corresponding poll for "Hottest Female Castaway". In all three cases, they were the highest-ranking contestants in both polls to have competed in only one season each. In a 2015 interview, Jeff Probst admitted that, if Borneo is not taken into consideration, then Cagayan ties with Heroes vs. Villains as his personal favorite season of Survivor ever, and that Spencer ties with Rob Cesternino for his favorite non-winning contestant ever.
