= Warren Hutcherson =

American screenwriter

Warren A. Hutcherson
- Born: Baltimore, Maryland, U.S.
- Occupations: Actor, comedian, producer, writer, director
- Years active: 1985–present

Warren Hutcherson is an American comedian, writer, producer, and director. He has served as a producer on several television sitcoms.

Hutcherson wrote for Saturday Night Live for two years (1991–93) and Living Single for four years (1993–97) before he created his own sitcom for NBC, Built to Last, in the 1997 television season. After the show was canceled, Hutcherson became executive producer of The Parent Hood for its final season (1998), Moesha for two seasons (1998–2000), The Bernie Mac Show (2002–05) and Just Jordan (2006). He was also a writer and consulting producer on Everybody Hates Chris and played a supporting role in Freeloaders (2012). In 2019 he became executive producer of Raven's Home, succeeding Eunetta T. Boone as showrunner after her death for the rest of season 3 until the end of season 4.
