= Tony Vlachos =

American television personality (born 1973)

- Born: Anthony Vlachos; September 10, 1973 (age 53); Jersey City, New Jersey, U.S.
- Occupations: Police officer, reality television personality
- Television: Survivor: Cagayan (winner); Survivor: Game Changers; Survivor: Winners at War (winner); The Traitors 3 Australian Survivor: Australia V The World
- Spouse: Marissa Vlachos (2012 – present)
- Children: 2

Anthony Vlachos (Greek: Αντώνης Βλάχος, romanized: Antónis Vláchos; born September 10, 1973) is an American police officer and reality television personality, best known for competing on the reality television competition series Survivor, of which he is the second person to win two seasons. He won the show's 28th season, Survivor: Cagayan, as well as the 40th season, Survivor: Winners at War. He also competed in the 34th season, Survivor: Game Changers, where he was the second person voted out. He competed for a fourth time on Survivor, where he represented the USA on the Australia V The World season of Australian Survivor.

As a Survivor player, he was noted for his strategic, dominant gameplay, with which he was able to manipulate other contestants while avoiding being voted against at Tribal Council, as well as his humor. Vlachos is also known for his long-lasting "Cops R' Us" partnership with fellow contestant and police officer Sarah Lacina, who won Game Changers, the two participating in the same three seasons they appeared on.

In February 2015, following Vlachos' first season on the show, Survivor host Jeff Probst published a list of his "Top 10 Survivor Winners of All Time," ranking Vlachos fourth, stating that he had "never seen anyone play with that much energy and juggle that many balls at once, and pull it all off." Upon winning the 40th season and its accompanying $2 million prize, Vlachos became the first man to win Survivor twice (and second person altogether after Sandra Diaz-Twine). He has won the most money from Survivor among all contestants, totaling just over $3 million across his three seasons. Martin Holmes of Vulture called Vlachos the "King of Survivor", and he is widely considered one of the greatest Survivor contestants of all time.

== Personal life ==
Vlachos was born on September 10, 1973, the son of Greek immigrants. He grew up in Jersey City, New Jersey, idolizing law enforcement officers and dreamed of one day becoming one. He graduated high school in 1992, and spent several years working in various different jobs while "partying" with his friends and working on his automobiles. He states that despite this recreational period in his life, he did not smoke, drink alcohol, or do drugs.

He began bodybuilding when he was 20, an activity with which he says he was "obsessed". He began working out in his basement with plastic weights filled with sand, and graduated to iron weights in about a year. In 2000, Vlachos became a Jersey City police officer. On February 5, 2014, he saved a 69-year-old man who had a heart attack on his lawn in nine inches of snow.

In 2007, Vlachos began dating a fellow police officer named Marissa Ann. They dated for approximately three years before he proposed to her on July 24, 2010. They married on June 2, 2012, and their daughter, Anastasia Marie, was born on February 16, 2013, five months before Vlachos left to film Survivor: Cagayan. Two months after arriving home, Vlachos and Marissa discovered she was two months pregnant with their second child, a son they named Constantine Anthony, who was born on June 9, 2014.

As of 2019, Vlachos is a resident of Allendale, New Jersey.

== Survivor ==
=== Cagayan ===
Vlachos was cast on the 28th season of the reality television show Survivor, Survivor: Cagayan. The theme of the season was "Brawn vs. Brains vs. Beauty", with participants split into three tribes based on these features. Vlachos was cast on the Aparri "brawn" tribe. Before the first tribal swap, Aparri dominated the immunity challenges and did not go to tribal council. During this time, Vlachos formed an alliance, dubbed "Cops-R-Us", with fellow police officer Sarah Lacina. Despite this alliance, Vlachos lied to Lacina about his profession, claiming he was a construction worker. Vlachos also became close with Trish Hegarty and was wary of the popularity of former NBA All-Star Clifford Robinson. Vlachos was able to find the Aparri tribe's hidden immunity idol with help of the clue he found in the reward they received after winning a challenge. At the final tribal council, the jury ultimately chose him as the winner with a vote of 8–1, beating martial arts instructor Woo Hwang.

==== Aftermath ====
In a 2015 interview, host Jeff Probst listed Vlachos as one of his top 10 favorite Survivor winners ever, and one of his top 6 favorite male winners, commenting, "I like Tony because he's unlike any winner we've ever had. He's the Tasmanian Devil. He played an incredibly reckless game, but he was so gifted that he could make a mistake and recover because he was lapping you so that he was able to actually catch back up and fix his mistake. It's almost like he had his own time machine. I've never seen anyone play with that much energy and juggle that many balls at once, and pull it all off." In 2016, Vlachos became a part of the Survivor Hall of Fame, along with Tina Wesson and Rupert Boneham. In March 2020, Briana Kranich, writing for Screen Rant, ranked Survivor: Cagayan the best season of Survivor.

=== Game Changers ===
At the end of the reunion show for the 33rd season, Survivor: Millennials vs. Gen X, Vlachos was confirmed to be a participant in the 34th season: Survivor: Game Changers. Vlachos' strategy for this series was wildly unpredictable, beginning his search for idols immediately after arriving at the beach in full view of his tribemates, framing others by planting an idol in someone else's belongings, and feigning an intimate personal bond with multiple tribe members. Dalton Ross, writing for Entertainment Weekly, called this strategy "one of the most aggressive games ever." However, when he informed Diaz-Twine about his spy bunker, she informed other tribe members, and ultimately campaigned to have him voted out. Despite this, Vlachos later stated in an interview with CBS that because she was voted out after him, the two of them became friends during the considerable time they spent on the pre-jury trip to Vietnam. In a January 2020 interview, he stated that losing Game Changers helped prepare him for Winners at War.

=== Winners at War ===
During the promotional trailer for the season during the reunion show for the 39th season, Survivor: Island of the Idols, Vlachos was confirmed to be a participant in the 40th season: Survivor: Winners at War. Vlachos started on the Dakal tribe. Vlachos adapted his style to approach the season with a gameplay distinct from his Cagayan strategy, which involved an alliance with fellow police officer Sarah Lacina, surveillance from a spy nest, and maintaining his threat level by staying calm for a good portion of the game and orchestrating attacks upon lower-threat targets.Later in the game, he became a power player, taking control and eliminating anyone who got in his way or plotted against him, but he managed to stay in the game and not receive any votes against him due to his strong allegiances with Lacina and Ben Driebergen, and winning four individual immunity challenges. On night 38, he beat Lacina in the Fire-making a tiebreaker to make it back to the Final Tribal Council. He was praised for his control of the game and likability at the Final Tribal Council. He ultimately became the second two-time winner (after Sandra) after receiving 12 of the 16 jury votes.

=== Australia V The World ===
In 2025, Vlachos appeared on Survivor: Australia v The World, joining representatives from other versions of Survivor in competing against a tribe of former Australian Survivor contestants. On the World tribe, he was joined by fellow Americans including four-time player and Survivor: Micronesia winner Parvati Shallow and four-time player, Cirie Fields.

After Survivor South Africa: Island of Secrets winner, Rob Bentele, was voted out, Vlachos found himself socially on the outs of the tribe, while the remaining internationals (Kass Bastarache, runner up of Survivor Québec 2024, Lisa Holmes winner of Survivor NZ: Thailand, Survivor Finland 2022 runner-up, Tommi Manninen) grew closer as an alliance and Shallow and Fields reunited their "Black Widow" alliance from Micronesia with a focus on recruiting Bastarache and Holmes. With Vlachos as the odd man out, he found himself an easy target and became increasingly paranoid, particularly from correctly believing that the women of the tribe had found a key to a mystery box in camp. He was later voted off on day 7, one day before the merge.

== Traitors ==
Vlachos was on the season 3 of The Traitors. The series premiered on February 7, 2024. He was cast as a faithful and ultimately banished on episode 3 of the season. After the episode aired, Vlachos lashed out at his fellow Traitors contestant and former Survivor castmate, Boston Rob Mariano, calling him a "sell out" as Rob was one of the traitors who helped eliminate him.

== Filmography ==
=== Television ===
| Year | Title | Role | Notes |
|---|---|---|---|
| 2014 | Survivor: Cagayan — Brains vs. Brawn vs. Beauty | Contestant | Winner |
| 2017 | Survivor: Game Changers — Mamanuca Islands | Contestant | Eliminated; 19th place |
| 2020 | Survivor: Winners at War | Contestant | Winner |
| 2025 | The Traitors 3 | Contestant - Faithful | Banished; 20th place |
| 2025 | Australian Survivor: Australia V The World | Contestant | Eliminated - 11th place |

| Preceded by Tyson Apostol | Winner of Survivor; Survivor: Cagayan | Succeeded by Natalie Anderson |
| Preceded by Tommy Sheehan | Winner of Survivor; Survivor: Winners at War | Succeeded by Erika Casupanan |
