= Survivor: Heroes vs. Villains =

20th season of the reality television series

- Season 20
- Region 1 DVD cover
- Presented by: Jeff Probst
- No. of days: 39
- No. of castaways: 20
- Winner: Sandra Diaz-Twine
- Runner-up: Parvati Shallow
- Location: Upolu, Samoa
- Sprint Player of the Season: Russell Hantz
- No. of episodes: 15

Release
- Original network: CBS
- Original release: February 11 – May 16, 2010

Additional information
- Filming dates: August 9 – September 16, 2009

Season chronology
- ← Previous; Samoa Next → Nicaragua

Survivor: Heroes vs. Villains is the twentieth season of the American CBS competitive reality television series Survivor. Premiering on February 11, 2010, it was the show's fourth season to feature contestants from past seasons, after Survivor: All-Stars, Survivor: Guatemala, and Survivor: Micronesia and was only the second season to feature a cast consisting entirely of returning players, after All-Stars. The season was filmed in Upolu, Samoa. Unlike previous seasons, the preceding season and this season were filmed back-to-back due to budget constraints stemming from the worldwide Great Recession.

After 39 days, Sandra Diaz-Twine became the first two-time Survivor winner, defeating Parvati Shallow and Russell Hantz with a vote of 6–3–0. Despite receiving zero jury votes, Hantz was voted by fans to win "Sprint Player of the Season" award for the second consecutive season and the $100,000 prize that went with it, earning the fans' vote over runner-up Rupert Boneham.

== Format ==
Survivor is a reality television show based on the Swedish show Expedition Robinson, created by Mark Burnett and Charlie Parsons. The series follows a number of participants isolated in a remote location, where they must provide food, fire, and shelter. One participant is removed from the series by majority vote every three days, with challenges held to give a reward (ranging from living- and food-related prizes to a car) and immunity from being voted out of the series. The last remaining player receives a prize of $1,000,000.

== Contestants ==
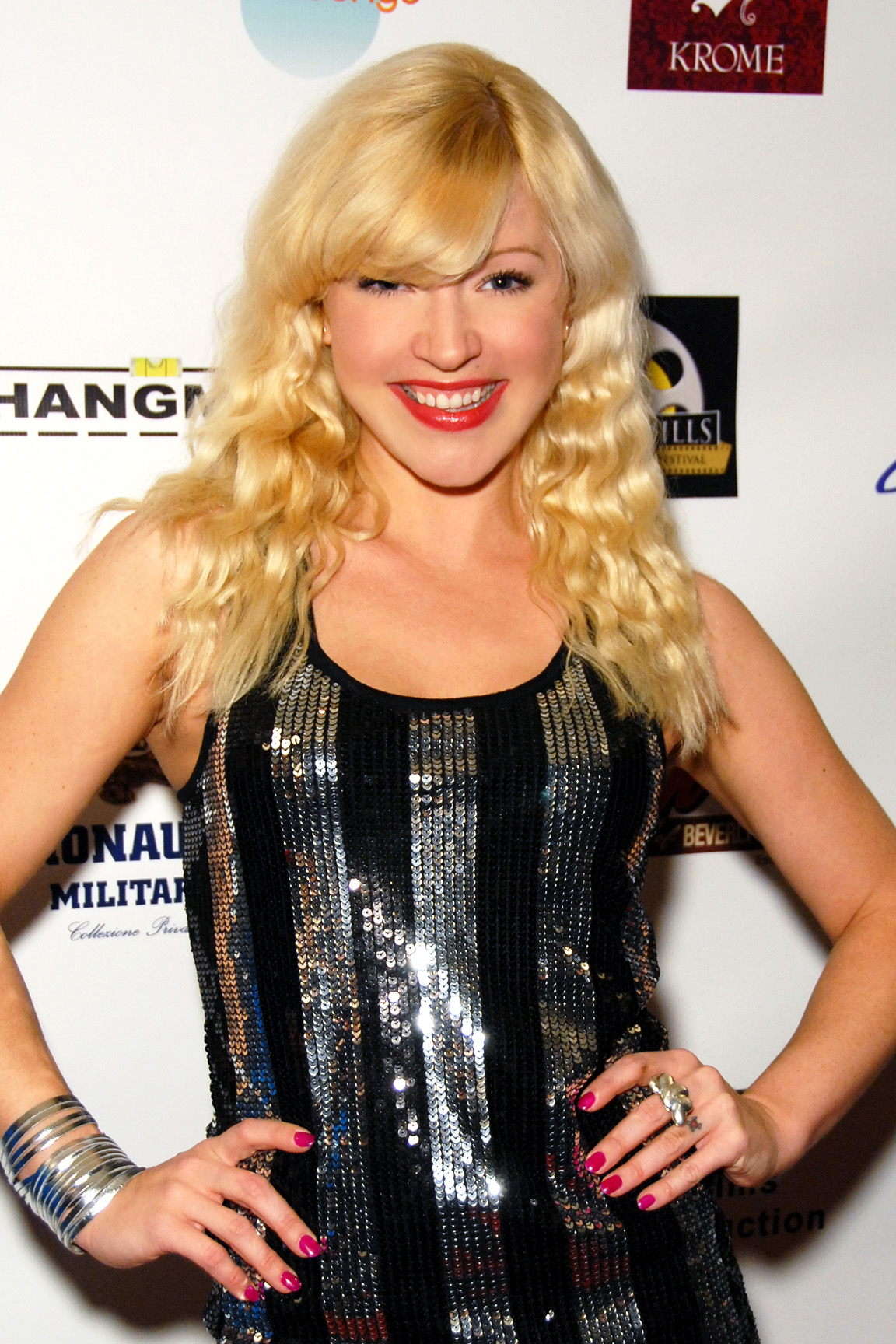
Jessica "Sugar" Kiper

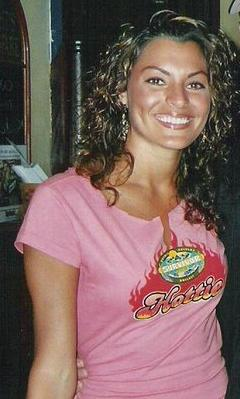
Stephenie LaGrossa

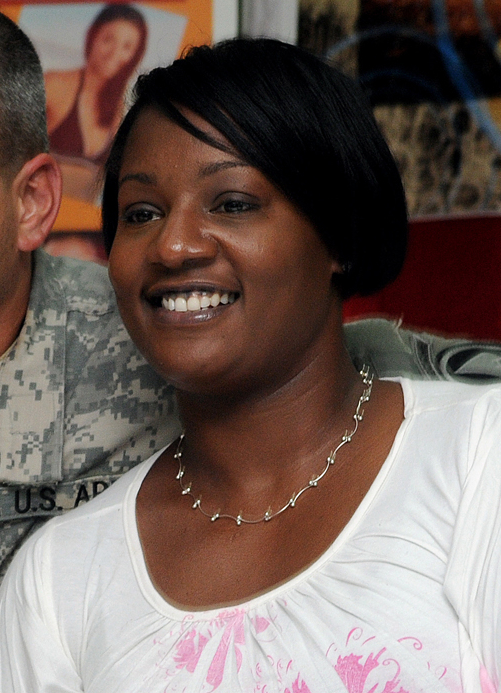
Cirie Fields

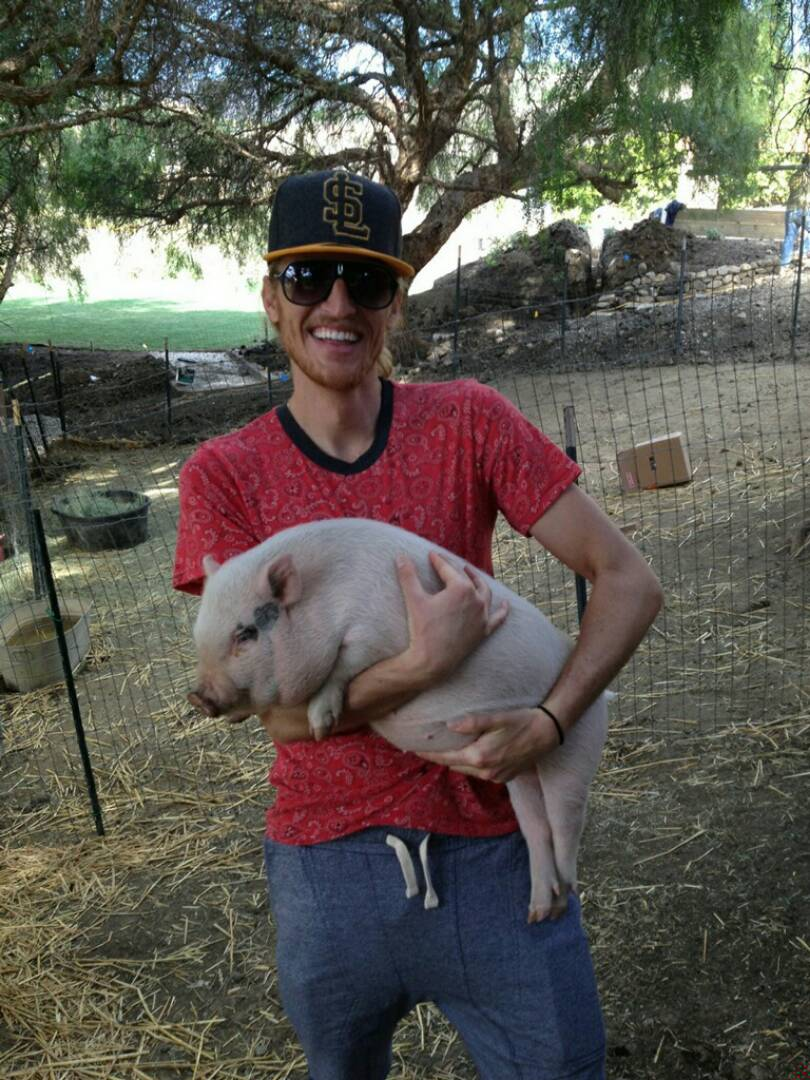
Tyson Apostol

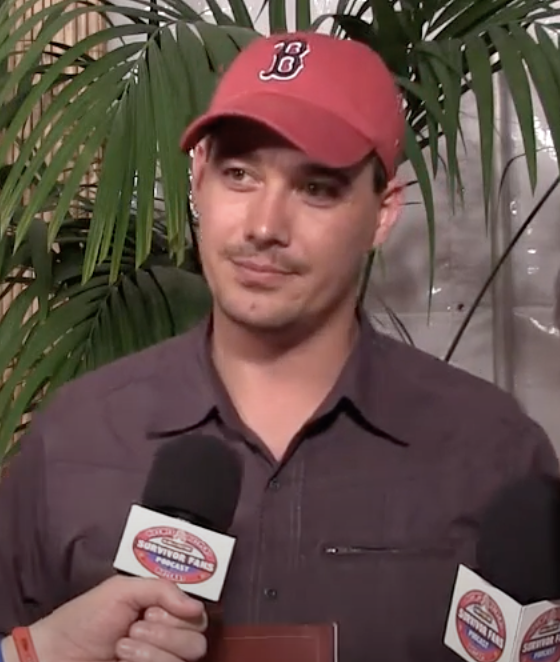
Rob Mariano

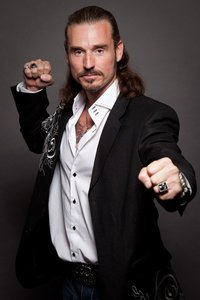
Benjamin "Coach" Wade

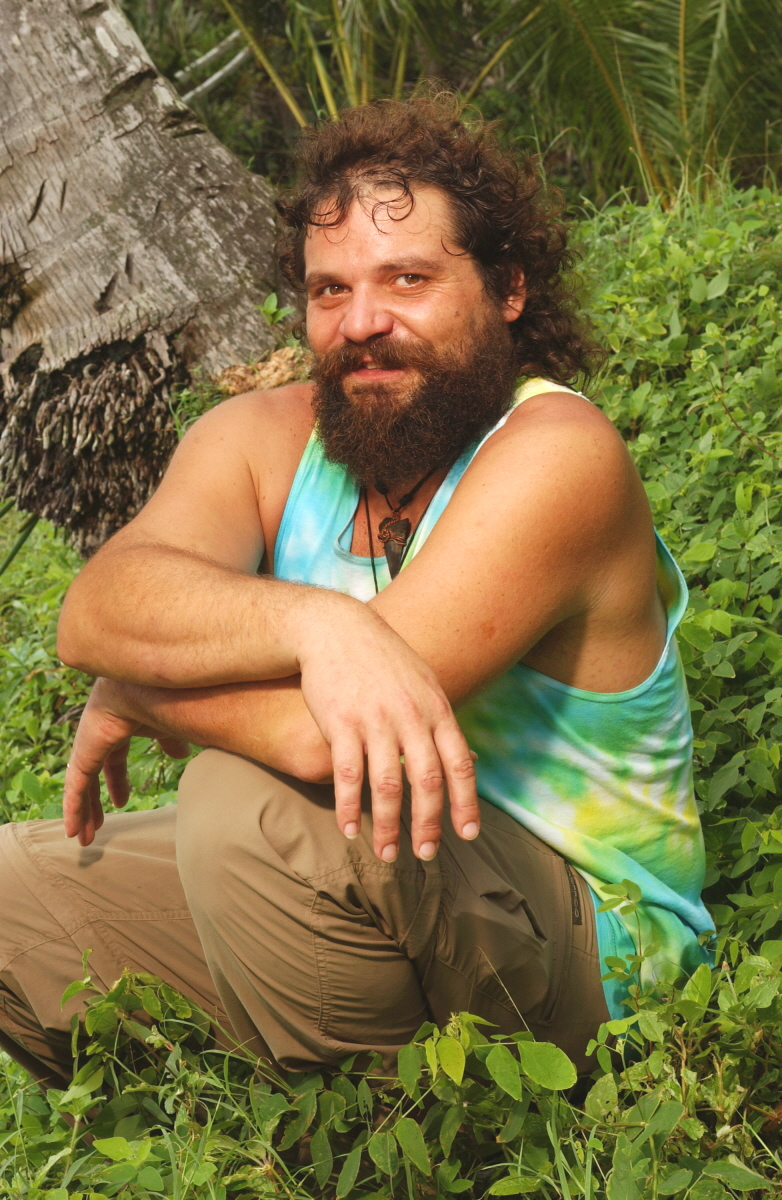
Rupert Boneham

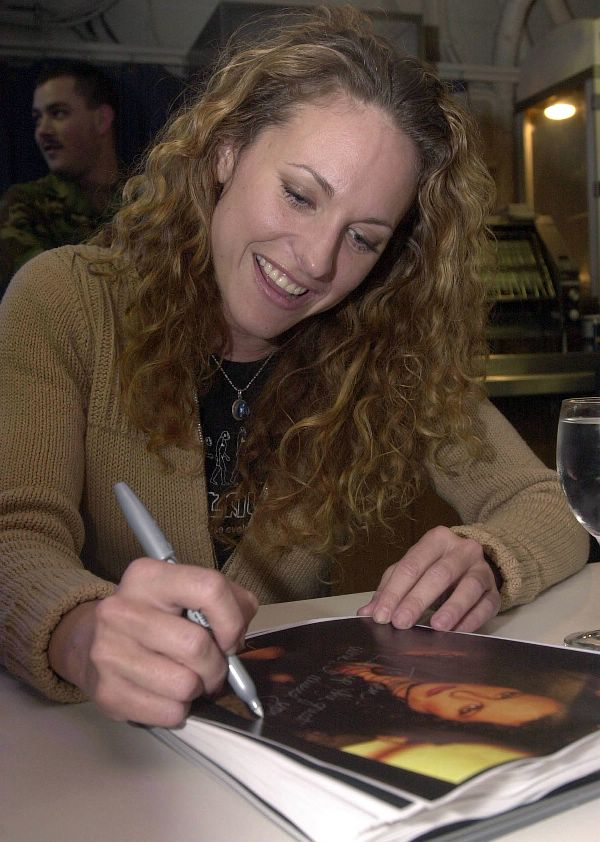
Jerri Manthey

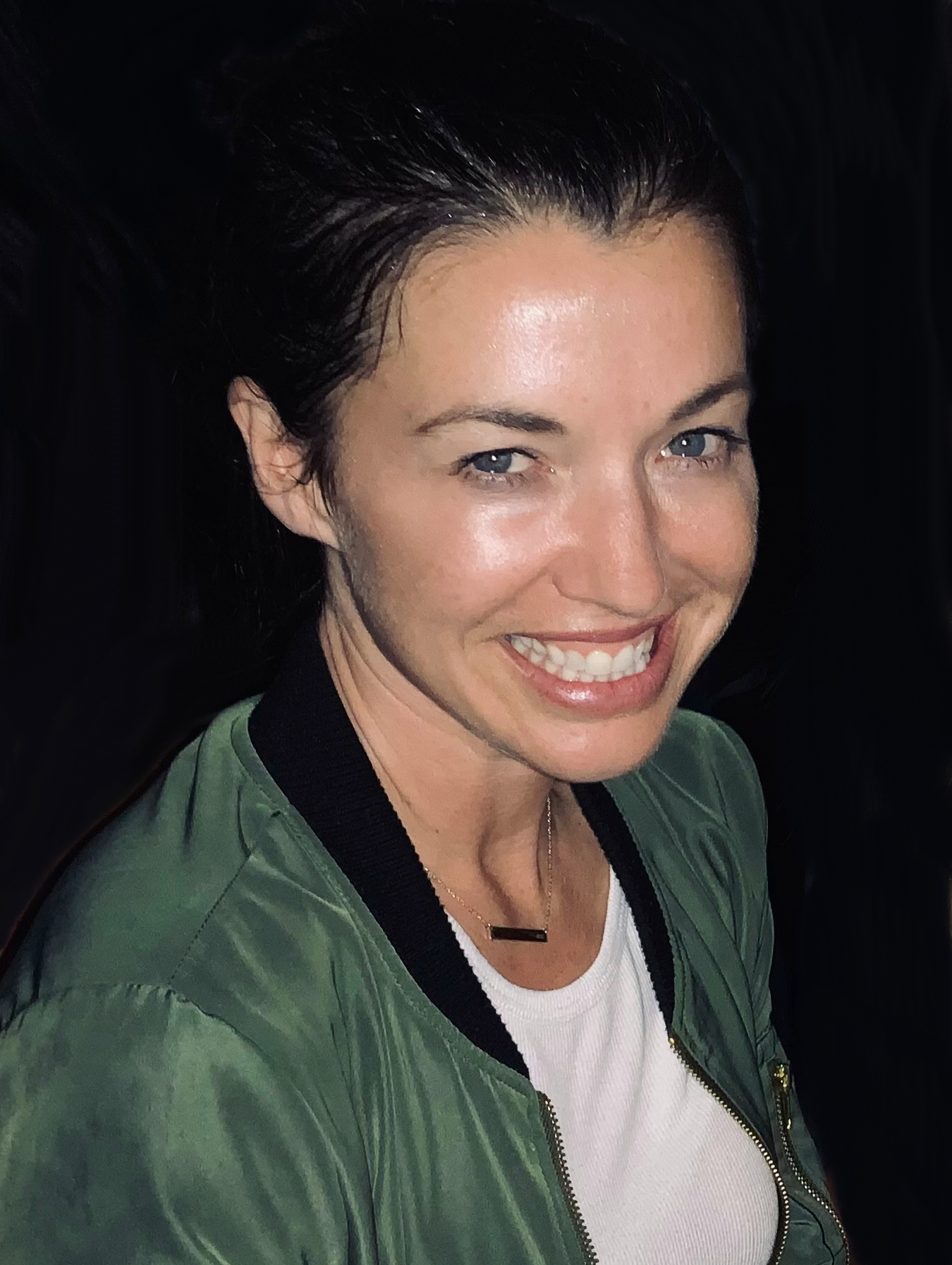
Parvati Shallow

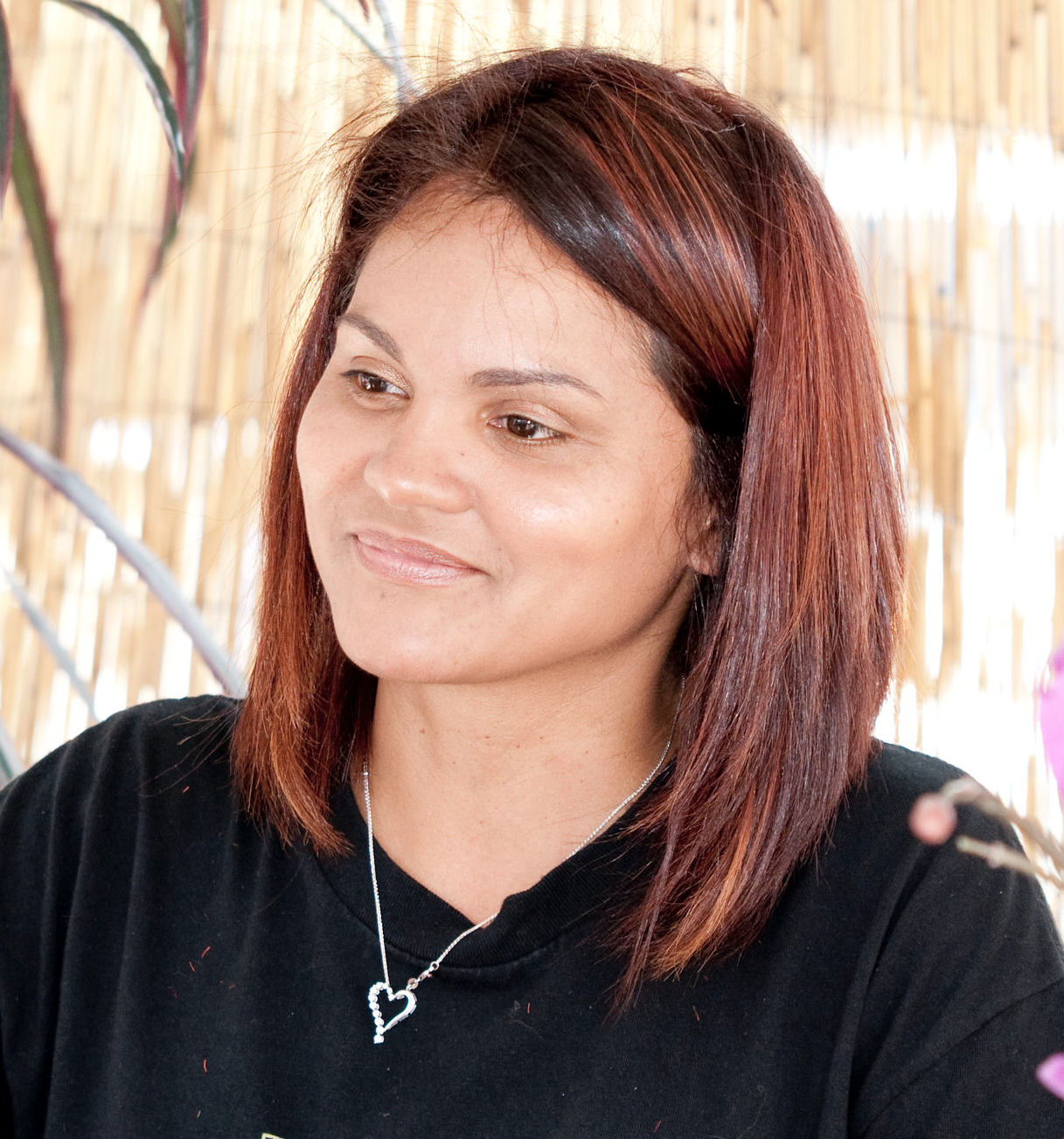
Sandra Diaz-Twine

There were twenty contestants overall, divided into two tribes, Heroes and Villains. After ten contestants were eliminated, the tribes were combined, or merged, to form one tribe, Yin Yang. Nine contestants made up the jury, who ultimately decided who would win the game and the $1 million grand prize.

Due to the back-to-back filming of Survivor: Samoa and this season, the other players did not have an opportunity to see Russell Hantz's gameplay in Samoa nor reveal more information about him; however, prior to the start of the game the production crew did tell the players that Hantz was considered "one of the five most notorious male villains of all time".

List of Survivor: Heroes vs. Villains contestants
Contestant	Age	From	Tribe		Finish	
Contestant	Age	From	Original	Merged	Placement	Day
Jessica "Sugar" Kiper Gabon	30	Los Angeles, California	Heroes		1st voted out	Day 3
Stephenie LaGrossa Palau & Guatemala	29	Philadelphia, Pennsylvania	Heroes		2nd voted out	Day 6
Randy Bailey Gabon	50	Austin, Texas	Villains		3rd voted out	Day 8
Cirie Fields Panama & Micronesia	39	Norwalk, Connecticut	Heroes		4th voted out	Day 11
Tom Westman Palau	45	New York City, New York	Heroes		5th voted out	Day 14
Tyson Apostol Tocantins	30	Heber City, Utah	Villains		6th voted out	Day 15
James Clement China & Micronesia	32	Lafayette, Louisiana	Heroes		7th voted out	Day 15
Rob Mariano Marquesas & All-Stars	33	Pensacola, Florida	Villains		8th voted out	Day 18
Benjamin "Coach" Wade Tocantins	37	Susanville, California	Villains		9th voted out 1st jury member	Day 21
Courtney Yates China	28	New York City, New York	Villains		10th voted out 2nd jury member	Day 24
James "J.T." Thomas Jr. Tocantins	25	Mobile, Alabama	Heroes	Yin Yang	11th voted out 3rd jury member	Day 27
Amanda Kimmel China & Micronesia	25	Los Angeles, California	Heroes	Yin Yang	12th voted out 4th jury member	Day 30
Candice Woodcock Cook Islands	26	Washington, D.C.	Heroes	Yin Yang	13th voted out 5th jury member	Day 31
Danielle DiLorenzo Panama	28	Los Angeles, California	Villains	Yin Yang	14th voted out 6th jury member	Day 33
Rupert Boneham Pearl Islands & All-Stars	45	Indianapolis, Indiana	Heroes	Yin Yang	15th voted out 7th jury member	Day 36
Colby Donaldson The Australian Outback & All-Stars	35	Los Angeles, California	Heroes	Yin Yang	16th voted out 8th jury member	Day 37
Jerri Manthey The Australian Outback & All-Stars	38	Los Angeles, California	Villains	Yin Yang	17th voted out 9th jury member	Day 38
Russell Hantz Samoa	36	Dayton, Texas	Villains	Yin Yang	2nd Runner-up	Day 39
Parvati Shallow Cook Islands & Micronesia	26	Los Angeles, California	Villains	Yin Yang	Runner-up	Day 39
Sandra Diaz-Twine Pearl Islands	35	Fayetteville, North Carolina	Villains	Yin Yang	Sole Survivor	Day 39

=== Future appearances ===
Russell Hantz and Rob Mariano returned to compete once again in Survivor: Redemption Island. Hantz later competed in Australian Survivor: Champions vs. Contenders at an international level. Benjamin "Coach" Wade returned to compete in Survivor: South Pacific. Rupert Boneham, Candice Woodcock, and Tyson Apostol returned for Survivor: Blood vs. Water. Boneham returned with his wife, Laura, who appeared in Heroes vs. Villains as a loved one; Woodcock, now using her husband's surname Cody, returned with her husband John; and Apostol returned with his girlfriend (now wife), Rachel Foulger. Cirie Fields, James "J.T." Thomas Jr., and Sandra Diaz-Twine returned to compete in the 34th season of the show, Survivor: Game Changers. Diaz-Twine and Mariano returned in Survivor: Island of the Idols to serve as mentors, and they both returned the very next season, along with Shallow and Apostol, to compete on Survivor: Winners at War. In 2026, LaGrossa (now Lagrossa-Kendrick), Fields, Wade, and Donaldson once again competed on Survivor 50: In the Hands of the Fans. Diaz-Twine also competed on Australian Survivor: Blood V Water with her daughter Nina. Fields and Shallow represented the USA on Australian Survivor: Australia V The World in 2025, where Shallow won.

Outside of Survivor, Boneham competed on The Amazing Race 31 with his wife Laura. Apostol competed on the first season of The Challenge: USA. Stephenie LaGrossa and Cirie Fields competed on the USA Network competition series Snake in the Grass. In 2023, LaGrossa and Fields also competed on the first season of Peacock reality TV series The Traitors. Later in 2023, Fields competed on Big Brother 25. In 2024, Shallow and Diaz-Twine competed on the second season of The Traitors. Mariano competed on Deal or No Deal Island. In 2025, Shallow competed on the second season of Deal or No Deal Island. In 2025, Mariano competed on the third season of the Peacock reality TV series The Traitors. Diaz-Twine also competed on 99 to Beat and the second season of Extracted. In 2026, Apostol competed on the third season of House of Villains.

== Season summary ==
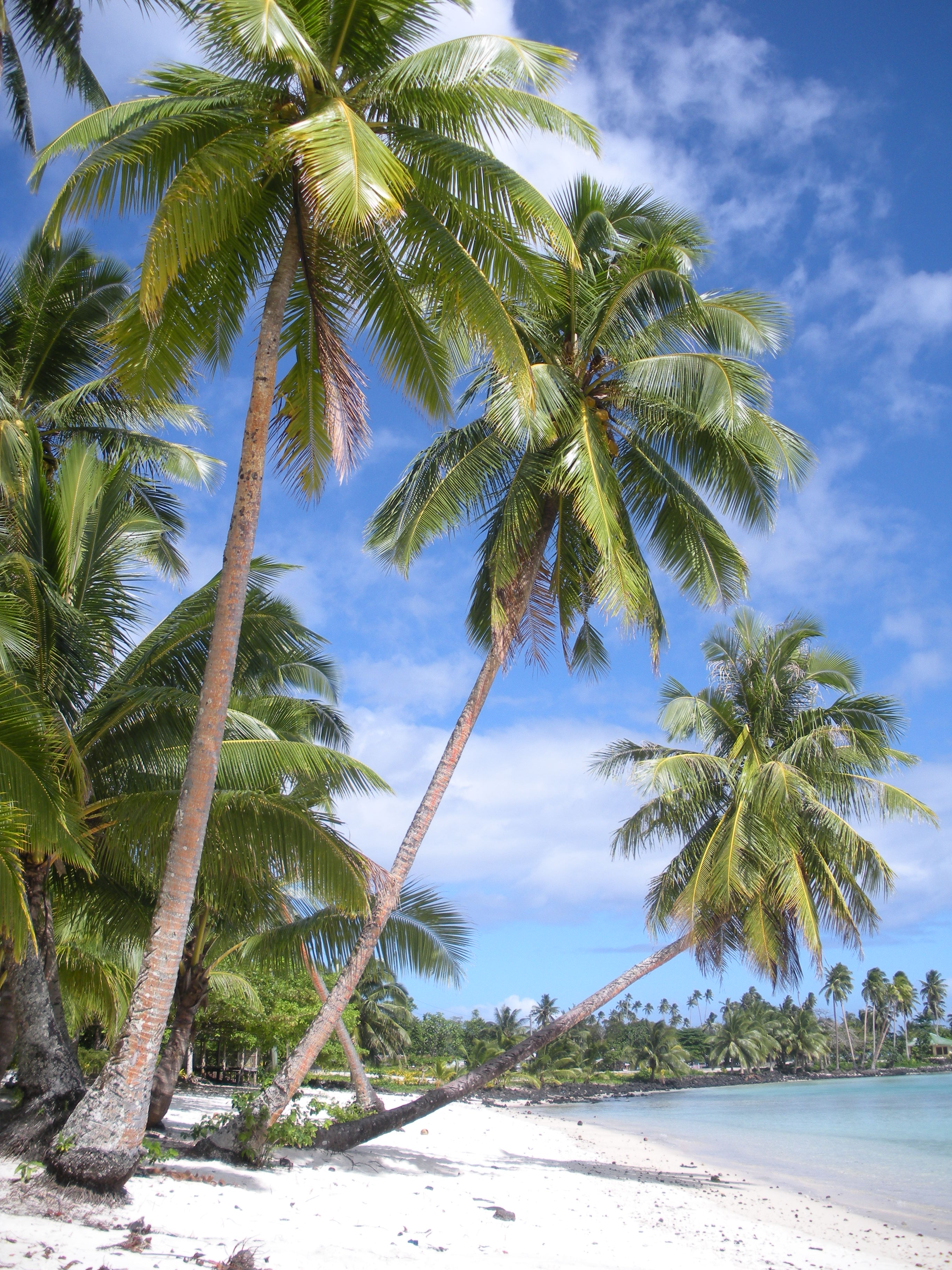
The season filmed in Upolu in Samoa.

The twenty returning castaways were divided into two tribes of ten based on their previous style of gameplay. The Villains dominated the earlier challenges due to Rob's leadership, only going to Tribal Council once in the first 14 days, and the Heroes were quickly whittled down to six members. The Villains tribe was divided into two factions: Rob's alliance of six, and the minority alliance of Russell, Parvati, and Danielle. At their second Tribal Council, Rob's alliance decided to split the vote between Russell and Parvati out of fear of Russell's hidden immunity idol. Rob's right-hand man Tyson, knowing that the minority alliance was voting for him, became uneasy and, following a confrontation with Russell, deviated from the plan, voting for Parvati instead of Russell. This error proved fatal, as Russell played his idol on Parvati, negating the four votes against her, and Tyson was voted out. The Villains lost the next Immunity Challenge and, due to Jerri aligning with Russell and Coach's inability to pick a side, Rob was voted out.

During the challenges after Rob's elimination, the Heroes were led to believe that the women of the tribe were methodically eliminating the men. J.T. found the Heroes' hidden idol, and the Heroes collectively agreed to sneak it to Russell, the last male Villain remaining, during a challenge in hopes that Russell would use it to eliminate Parvati and align with the Heroes at the merge. Instead, Russell shared the idol with Danielle, Jerri, and Parvati, unaware that Parvati and Danielle had also found the Villains' idol. Without Rob, the Villains lost the next two Immunity Challenges, leaving Sandra as the last remaining Villain outside of Russell's alliance of four.

With five Heroes and five Villains remaining, the tribes merged into Yin Yang. Russell crafted a story to explain the fate of the immunity idols, suggesting Parvati had played one against his. The Heroes took Russell's word, though Sandra, through Rupert, tried to warn them of Russell's duplicity. With Danielle winning the first individual immunity, Russell gave Parvati his idol prior to Tribal Council, believing the Heroes would target her. The Heroes became concerned about Russell's story, however, and changed their vote to target Jerri, believing her unlikely to possess an idol. At the vote, Parvati played her two idols for Jerri and Sandra, negating the Heroes' votes and eliminating J.T. Despite attempts to align with the Villains' majority, Heroes were consistently eliminated. However, after Russell realized that Parvati and Danielle's true loyalty was to each other, he betrayed Danielle and worked with remaining Heroes Colby and Rupert to vote her out. After that the final Heroes were eliminated, leaving Sandra, Russell, Parvati, and Jerri as the final four.

Russell, having won final immunity, felt he would have a better chance in the final tribal council against Sandra, who he believed did little in the game, than Jerri, who was the final player voted out. At the Final Tribal Council, Russell was lambasted for his poor social game, jury management, and open backstabbing. Parvati and Sandra both tried to sway the jury in their favor, with Parvati highlighting her social and physical game as well as her idol play that changed the course of the season. However, Parvati was also lambasted for being extremely close with Russell throughout the entire game. Sandra argued the opposite, saying even though she was weak in challenges, she always interacted with both sides and still was involved in strategy. She also highlighted her loyalty to allies Courtney, Tyson, and Rob, and had campaigned for Russell's removal since day one. Parvati received jury votes from all the villains except Courtney, but Sandra received all the Heroes' votes plus Courtney's, making Sandra the first two-time winner in Survivor history.

Challenge winners and eliminations by episode
Episode			Challenge winner(s)		Eliminated	
No.	Title	Original air date	Reward	Immunity	Tribe	Player
1	"Slay Everyone, Trust No One"	February 11, 2010	Heroes	Villains	Heroes	Sugar
2	"It's Getting the Best of Me"	February 18, 2010	Villains		Heroes	Stephenie
3	"That Girl is Like a Virus"	February 25, 2010	Heroes		Villains	Randy
4	"Tonight, We Make Our Move"	March 4, 2010	Villains	Villains	Heroes	Cirie
5	"Knights of the Round Table"	March 11, 2010	Villains	Villains	Heroes	Tom
6	"Banana Etiquette"	March 24, 2010	Rob (Note: Each tribe competed separately for individual immunity. The two winners, Rob and Candice, moved on to the final round. Rob won the final round, winning reward for the Villains.)	Rob (Villains)	Villains	Tyson
6	"Banana Etiquette"	March 24, 2010	Rob	Candice (Heroes)	Heroes	James
7	"I'm Not a Good Villain"	April 1, 2010	Heroes	Heroes	Villains	Rob
8	"Expectations"	April 8, 2010	Heroes	Heroes	Villains	Coach
9	"Survivor History"	April 15, 2010	Villains	Heroes	Villains	Courtney
10	"Going Down in Flames"	April 22, 2010	None (Note: There was no reward challenge due to the merge.)	Danielle	Yin Yang	J.T.
11	"Jumping Ship"	April 29, 2010	Amanda, Colby, Danielle	Jerri	Yin Yang	Amanda
12	"A Sinking Ship"	May 6, 2010	None	Parvati	Yin Yang	Candice
12	"A Sinking Ship"	May 6, 2010	None	Russell	Yin Yang	Danielle
13	"Loose Lips Sink Ships"	May 13, 2010	Jerri [Parvati, Sandra]	Parvati	Yin Yang	Rupert
14	"Anything Could Happen"	May 16, 2010	None	Parvati	Yin Yang	Colby
14	"Anything Could Happen"	May 16, 2010	None	Russell	Yin Yang	Jerri
15	"Reunion"	May 16, 2010				

In the case of multiple tribes or castaways who win reward or immunity, they are listed in order of finish, or alphabetically where it was a team effort; where one castaway won and invited others, the invitees are in brackets.

== Episodes ==
No. overall	No. in season	Title	Rating/share (household)	Rating/share (18-49)	Original release date	U.S. viewers (millions)	Weekly rank
290	1	"Slay Everyone, Trust No One"	8.1/13	4.5/12	February 11, 2010	14.15	#14
The returning castaways arrived on board four Royal New Zealand Air Force UH-1 Iroquois helicopters. After initial assessments about the tribe division, the contestants launched into a Reward challenge.: Reward challenge: The tribes would face off in pairs. The four castaways would race along the beach to dig up a single bag in a designated lane. The castaways would then have to race back to their respective finish mat. The first person to be touching the bag and their finish mat would score a point for their tribe. The first tribe to score three points would win flint. Battle Dig challenge from Panama.; During the aggressive challenge, two Heroes were injured. Stephenie dislocated a shoulder, which was immediately fixed, and Rupert broke a toe on his left foot. Neither injury resulted in evacuation. The Heroes won the challenge, obtaining flint. At both camps, the castaways found fishing gear. Russell made "top two" alliances with both Danielle and Parvati, although they both questioned his loyalty. Rob was quick to organize the Villains camp and helped them to create fire using a fire saw. At the Heroes camp, Rupert failed to start a fire while wasting much of the flint's magnesium, but Colby, J.T., and Stephenie were successful. Tom also found four wild chickens that he and his tribemates captured to use as food. Loose alliances between castaways that were previously on the same season were made, while Coach and Jerri formed a separate alliance and J.T. formed pacts with James and Tom. During the night, Sugar disrupted her tribemates' sleep with her excessive talkativeness.: Immunity challenge: Six members from each tribe would race to assemble a boat from seven pieces and seven planks and then paddle the boat out into the ocean to light their torch from the raft. Once the six members return with the fire and the seven planks, the remaining four tribe members would assemble a puzzle. The seven planks from the boat would then be used to assemble a ladder to the top of a platform and place the completed puzzle in a slot halfway up. The first tribe to have their whole tribe at the top of the platform and light their fire barrel would win. Should the Villains tribe win the challenge, they would receive flint. Lock, Load and Light challenge from Cook Islands.; At the Immunity challenge, the Heroes lost a significant lead due to their problems assembling the puzzle, and the Villains won, earning their flint. Back at the Heroes camp, Sugar targeted Amanda, but the rest of the tribe wanted to eliminate Sugar. Tom brought up voting for Cirie for strategic reasons. Amanda, Candice, and Cirie talked about voting for Stephenie or Tom to break up their potential alliance based on their season in Palau. At Tribal Council, the vote went against Sugar, and she was unanimously voted out.
291	2	"It's Getting the Best of Me"	6.9/11	3.9/11	February 18, 2010	11.94	#11
Frustrated by his tribe's lack of work ethic and cooperation in building a shelter, Rob wandered off into the jungle. Jerri found him collapsed on the jungle floor and called in the Survivor Medical Team, who found nothing to concern them and cleared Rob to continue.: Reward/Immunity challenge: In pairs, the castaways would race across a field to retrieve six large crates painted in their tribe's colors. Once all six crates were retrieved, the tribes would have to stack the crates into a staircase with the name of their tribe properly aligned along the sides. The first tribe to complete the staircase and get all of their members up the staircase to the top of a platform would win immunity and a tarp. A Crate Idea challenge from Tocantins.; During the combined Reward and Immunity Challenge, the Heroes initially gained a healthy lead but again ended up stumbling as they solved the puzzle staircase. Russell felt threatened by Rob's rising power in the Villains tribe and tried to demonstrate his own power by catching a chicken with a spear. James vented to his tribe about their lack of cooperation during the challenge and not following directions from J.T., who had performed the challenge in Tocantins. Mostly storming at Stephenie for their loss, he opined that her doings might have contributed to her original tribe's losing streak in Palau. Meanwhile, the trio of Colby, Stephenie, and Tom tried to convince Candice and Cirie to join them in voting out Amanda, who had previously played with Cirie, James, and two of the Villains. After a heated Tribal Council, Candice and Cirie decided to join Amanda, James, J.T., and Rupert in voting out Stephenie.
292	3	"That Girl is Like a Virus"	6.7/10	3.7/10	February 25, 2010	11.60	#14
James apologized to his tribe mates for his behavior at the previous Tribal Council. The next day, the men of the Heroes tribe "bonded" over recapturing two chickens that had escaped. Meanwhile, at the Villains camp, Coach and Rob warned Russell about the danger of his alliance with Parvati. In retaliation, Russell decided to show the two who was in control by hiding the tribe's machete during the night. Randy became frustrated when he seemed to be the only one providing food for his tribe, thrusting the role of the tribe's main provider on him and Rob. On the Heroes tribe, J.T. sowed distrust in Candice and Cirie's alliance by fabricating a story to Cirie that Candice didn't trust her. When Cirie confronted Candice, the latter scrambled to figure out who had made up the lie, which aggravated James.: Reward/Immunity challenge: The tribes would face off in a series of one-on-one sumo-style battles. The castaways would use padded duffel bags to knock their adversaries out of a ring and into the mud. The first tribe to win eight bouts would win immunity and a reward of coffee, sugar, rice for one week, and a luxury item for each castaway. Sumo at Sea challenge originally from Palau, version used was the adaptation from Fiji.; At the combined Reward and Immunity Challenge, the Heroes destroyed the Villains in an 8–0 blowout win. Discussions over whom to vote out focused on Parvati and Randy: Parvati for being a social threat and having four potential allies on the Heroes tribe, and Randy because he was one of the weaker competitors due to his age. At Tribal Council, the vote went against Randy, and he was unanimously sent home.
293	4	"Tonight, We Make Our Move"	7.2/12	3.8/11	March 4, 2010	12.72	#17
Coach vented his disappointment to Tyson about being singled out by Sandra at the previous Tribal Council. He considered quitting the game, but Rob assured Coach that his position in the tribe was secure.: Reward challenge: A member from each tribe would slide across a slippery surface and grab a ball with a certain color and number suspended above them. They would have to toss it into a basket to score a point. First tribe to score four points would win two selected items from a Sears catalog. The Heroes tribe chose cooking equipment and additional fishing gear. The Villains tribe chose additional materials to set up camp and a tool kit. Slip, Slide & Score challenge from Fiji.; The Villains won the challenge and selected tools, twine, and a tarp from the catalog. While unpacking their reward, Russell accidentally discovered a clue to a Hidden Immunity Idol in front of the tribe. After Rob read the clue out loud, Sandra made the point that whoever found it would be voted out next in order to flush out the idol. The rest of the tribe agreed and decided not to go look for the idol. Despite this warning, Russell went out to search, much to the anger of his tribe. At the Heroes camp, Tom discovered their clue in the jar of coffee beans. J.T. read the clue out loud, and several members of the Heroes tribe went looking for the idol. Tom succeeded in finding it and slipped it into his shoe, but Amanda saw this and informed the others.: Immunity challenge: One castaway would be strapped into a wooden spherical cage and would have to guide two blindfolded castaways in rolling the cage through a maze through the forest. At the end of the maze would be a labyrinth-like table maze. The castaway inside the cage would then have to guide four blindfolded castaways in solving the table maze. The first tribe to finish the table maze would win. Roll With It challenge from Samoa.; When the Heroes lost the Immunity Challenge, the majority alliance decided to split their votes between Colby and Tom, thus flushing the idol and sending Colby home. Tom reached an agreement with Amanda, James, and J.T. to vote out Candice after offering to give up the idol, but Cirie disagreed and convinced the majority to follow through with the plan to split the vote and flush the idol. J.T. was torn between going with the majority alliance and joining Colby and Tom in voting out Cirie. At Tribal Council, Tom played the Hidden Immunity Idol; therefore, the three votes against him were negated. In the end, J.T. turned on the majority alliance, and Cirie was voted out.
294	5	"Knights of the Round Table"	7.0/11	3.6/11	March 11, 2010	12.17	#14
When the Heroes returned to camp after Tribal Council, J.T. explained that his vote against Cirie was for the tribe and not for "personal reasons". However, Amanda and Rupert still questioned J.T.'s loyalties. At the Villains campsite, Russell continued his lone search for the Hidden Immunity Idol and soon found what he was looking for.: Reward challenge: In a walled off arena, three members of each tribe would battle for control of three balls. Once a castaway got control of a ball, they would pass the ball to three other tribe members standing on a platform who would attempt to throw the ball through the opposing tribe's basket at the other end of the arena. One point would be scored when a ball was made in the basket. After every point, the tribes would change who was in the arena and on the platform. The first tribe to score two points would win a trip to a swimming hole and a feast of chocolate bars, chocolate cake, chocolate chip cookies, and chocolate milk. Schmergen Brawl challenge from Samoa.; Shortly into the Reward Challenge, James suffered an injury to his left knee when he unsuccessfully attempted to catch a ball. After the Villains won the challenge by a score of 2–1, James's knee was braced by the Survivor Medical Team and he was cleared to continue in the game. While on their reward trip, Russell told Coach and Parvati that he now had the Hidden Immunity Idol, and a potential alliance brewed.: Immunity challenge: One castaway from each tribe would work as a caller to direct their tribemates, who would be blindfolded and teamed up in pairs, in collecting ten large puzzle pieces from a field. Once all of the puzzle pieces were collected, the entire tribe would work together to assemble the puzzle. The first tribe to complete their puzzle would win. Tiki Towers challenge from All-Stars.; James led the Heroes to an early lead but they all struggled at the puzzle. Rob then led the Villains to another immunity win. Before Tribal Council, Rupert gunned for Candice for being the weakest, while Candice wanted to vote out James due to his injury. Meanwhile, J.T. vacillated between voting for James or Tom. At Tribal Council, Candice and J.T. voted against Tom, and he was sent home.
295	6	"Banana Etiquette"	6.6/11	3.4/11	March 24, 2010	11.15	#15
The tribes were surprised when Jeff announced that both would be going to Tribal Council but that the challenge was individual.: Reward/Immunity challenge: The tribes would compete separately for individual immunity. The castaways would be attached to a rope threaded through obstacles which they would have to climb under, over, or around. The first Hero and the first Villain to win would be immune from the vote. They would then move on to the final round, which was the same challenge but with a single obstacle three levels high. The first castaway to complete the obstacle would win reward for their tribe consisting of hot dogs and soft drinks to be enjoyed at the opposing tribe's Tribal Council. Around the Bend challenge originally from Guatemala, version used was the adaptation from Tocantins.; Candice defeated JT to win for the Heroes, and Rob defeated Tyson to win for the Villains; Rob then defeated Candice to win the reward for his tribe. Upon arriving at the Heroes' camp, Colby believed it was his time to go; however, the rest of the tribe members talked about voting out James instead of Colby to keep the tribe stronger. James tried to prove he was still strong by challenging JT to a race, but JT defeated him easily, even running backwards halfway through the race. Another consideration for voting out James was Amanda's criticism that he hogged all the bananas he could find; she explained that "banana etiquette" required him to bring back enough for everyone. At the Villains' camp, Rob, assuming that Russell possessed the Hidden Immunity Idol, organized his alliance members to split their votes between Russell and Parvati, so that they would hopefully flush out the idol and remove one of the two. As a strategy to put the numbers against Tyson and not himself, Russell approached Tyson and convinced him to vote for Parvati. Tyson, believing Russell would also vote Parvati, opted to switch his vote to her as well, although Russell actually planned to vote for Tyson. At their Tribal Council, Russell presented the Hidden Immunity Idol to Parvati. When she played the idol, the four votes cast against her were negated, thus blindsiding Tyson with a vote of 3–2–0. Afterwards, the Villains enjoyed their reward at the Heroes' Tribal Council, where James castigated Colby for not performing as well in challenges as he had in Australia. The tribe ultimately agreed that James' knee injury and brutish demeanor were too serious to ignore, and, in a unanimous vote, he was next to go.
296	7	"I'm Not a Good Villain"	6.7/12	3.5/13	April 1, 2010	11.26	#11
Rob was stunned by the results of previous Tribal Council and was suspicious of his alliance's loyalties. Jerri was wavering about her alliance with Rob, and Parvati promised her a spot in the final four with herself, Danielle, and Russell.: Reward challenge: Competing in rounds, the tribes would face off three to a side in the ocean to get control of a ball and shoot it into their basket to score a point. The first tribe to score three points would win a trip to a waterfall with a feast. Basket Brawl challenge from Tocantins.; Sensing that he needed to step up at the challenges to prove to his tribe that voting James off was not a mistake, Colby led the Heroes to a 3–0 win. When the Heroes arrived at the waterfall for their reward, they received a note that there was another Hidden Immunity Idol at their beach. They agreed that they would find the idol together and use it against the Villains instead of against each other. At the Villains' camp, Russell told Coach and Jerri that he wanted to take them to the final three. Jerri accepted the offer and aligned herself with Russell, while Coach was skeptical of Russell's promises. Coach was hurt by Jerri's alignment with Russell, as he thought he deserved a greater level of trust and loyalty from her.: Immunity challenge: One at a time, three castaways from each tribe would race across a platform and a rope net and then climb up a rope web to retrieve six bags of puzzle pieces. Once all six bags were retrieved, two other castaways from each tribe would assemble the puzzle. The first tribe to assemble their puzzle would win. Caught in the Web challenge based upon one used in Africa, and in Guatemala, with the puzzle part inspired from a challenge from Cook Islands.; At the Immunity Challenge, the Heroes finally won a challenge with a puzzle component. Back at camp, Russell told Rob that either Courtney or Sandra, both of whom were sitting right beside him, had to go home next. Rob tried to convince Coach to vote for Russell by appealing to his respect for loyalty, and Coach gave him his word. Russell devised a plan to blindside Rob while talking with Coach, Danielle, and Jerri, and although Coach disagreed, he eventually stated that he was with them 100%. Coach was torn because he didn't want to betray his promise to either Rob or Russell. At the Villains' Tribal Council, the votes were cast; while Coach tried to sit in the middle by voting for Courtney, Jerri joined Russell's alliance thus eliminating Rob.
297	8	"Expectations"	7.3/12	3.8/12	April 8, 2010	12.38	#13
At the Heroes campsite, J.T. went off looking for the Hidden Immunity Idol for himself, even though the tribe had promised earlier to look for it together. He found the idol, but Amanda came across him before he could hide it, forcing him to tell the whole tribe about it in order to maintain trust. Before the Reward Challenge, the Villains misinterpreted the day's tree mail as a hint to an impending merge. In response, they brought all of their camp equipment to the challenge, only to have Jeff announce that the tribes were not merging. After seeing Rob voted out, the Heroes assumed an all-girl alliance was in control of the Villains, although the power truly lay with Danielle, Parvati, and Russell.: Reward challenge: The castaways would compete in a bowling tournament. Each castaway would be matched against another castaway and given two rolls. The castaway who knocked down the most pins won the round for their tribe and scored one point. The first tribe to score three points won a feast of pizza, garlic bread, brownies, and drinks. Fauxconut Bowling challenge from Samoa.; The Heroes continued their winning streak by defeating the Villains at the Reward Challenge. Feeling that she and Courtney were on the outs with their tribe, Sandra plotted to trick Russell into believing that Coach was gunning for him, in order to save Courtney. Russell, who seemed immediately convinced, conspired with Parvati to vote out Coach, a move they hoped would further strengthen the misconception of an all-girl alliance.: Immunity challenge: Competing in rounds, two castaways from each tribe would be belted together and would have to race across a mud pit and over obstacles to retrieve a flag to score a point for their tribe. The second round would be a one-on-one competition, while the third round would be back to two-on-two. The first tribe to score two points would win. Mud Slide challenge from Survivor: Guatemala.; The Heroes extended their winning streak to four at the Immunity Challenge. Russell and Danielle had a heated discussion over whether they should vote out Coach or Courtney, with Russell ultimately voting for Courtney. At Tribal Council, Sandra and Courtney's plan came to fruition, and Coach became the first member of the jury.
298	9	"Survivor History"	7.1/13	3.8/12	April 15, 2010	12.31	#12
At the reward challenge, the Heroes continued to believe there was a women's alliance on the Villains tribe due to the departure of Coach and silent signals that Russell made to J.T.: Reward challenge: The castaways would compete in an endurance contest in which castaways were ranked strongest to weakest in their tribes. These rankings would be used to determine the matchups between each tribe. Each castaway would stand on footholds. After ten minutes, the castaways would move to smaller footholds. After another ten minutes, they would move to the smallest footholds and stay there until the challenge was over. A castaway would score a point for their tribe by outlasting their opponent. The first tribe to score three points would win an all-you-can-eat feast courtesy of Outback Steakhouse. Chimney Sweep challenge from Fiji and Tocantins.; The Villains would go on to win the Reward Challenge. During the feast, Parvati discovered a clue to another Hidden Immunity Idol tucked into her napkin at the dining table. Parvati secretly showed the clue to Danielle in order to strengthen her loyalty to Parvati versus Russell; they successfully found the idol the next morning and kept it secret from the rest of the tribe. Over at the Heroes camp, J.T. shared his plan to give Russell their tribe's Hidden Immunity Idol at the next Immunity Challenge in order to protect him from the next vote and gain his loyalty post-merger, hoping he would use it to eliminate Parvati; Amanda and Candice thought this would be a bad idea but would also keep the idol out of J.T.'s hands and agreed to it.: Immunity challenge: One at a time, five castaways from each tribe would maneuver a bag of puzzle pieces attached to a rope through an obstacle course in the ocean. The first tribe to retrieve all five bags and assemble the puzzle (a totem pole) would win. Strung Out challenge from Vanuatu.; At the Immunity Challenge, the Heroes dominated throughout and won the challenge. J.T., with Colby's help, successfully gave the idol, wrapped in a letter to explain his reasoning, to Russell during the post-challenge congratulations. Back at the Villains camp, Russell shared the letter and his possession of the idol with Parvati, Danielle, and Jerri, acknowledging the Heroes fell for the woman's alliance plan. Courtney, knowing she was likely to be voted out, attempted to pledge her loyalty to Parvati in an effort to stay in the game; Parvati lobbied her alliance to keep Courtney in the game, but they opted to eliminate her anyway, and Courtney was unanimously sent to the jury.
299	10	"Going Down in Flames"	7.0/12	3.6/11	April 22, 2010	11.89	#8
The tree mail on day 25 announced the merge of the tribes, with the Villains moving to the Heroes campsite and enjoying the traditional feast, eventually naming themselves "Yin Yang" in keeping with the theme of "good vs evil". Russell, Parvati, and Danielle conspired to share the same false story to explain Parvati's survival of the previous Tribal Council; that both Russell and Parvati played opposing hidden immunity idols and voting out Courtney in the revote. Russell maintained the trust the Heroes had with him to eliminate the supposed Villains' "woman's alliance" through its leader, Parvati. However, Sandra was able to pull aside Rupert and explain the truth of the former Tribal Council; Rupert reported this to the other Heroes, and together they decided to test Russell's loyalty by informing him they were voting for Parvati while they would vote off someone else. Parvati secretly told Amanda about her Hidden Immunity Idol in order to get information on who the Heroes were going to vote out.: Immunity challenge: The castaways would hang onto a pole as long as they can. The last person left hanging without touching the ground would win. Get a Grip challenge from Vanuatu, Cook Islands, and Tocantins.; The challenge came down to Danielle and Parvati but the latter agreed to step down, knowing she still had her Hidden Immunity Idol, giving Danielle the win. Following the challenge, Russell gave Parvati his Hidden Immunity Idol, believing her to be in trouble at the vote. The Heroes decided to make Jerri their target, believing the possibility of Parvati having an idol and would use it if she felt vulnerable. Amanda, following up on her previous conversation with Parvati, told Parvati she would be the target, but Parvati distrusted her statement. At Tribal Council, the Heroes voted for Jerri and the Villains voted for J.T as planned. Before the votes were read, Parvati surprised the whole tribe by giving a Hidden Immunity Idol to both Jerri and Sandra. They both played the idols, negating the five votes cast against Jerri. J.T. was sent to the jury.
300	11	"Jumping Ship"	7.6/13	4.1/13	April 29, 2010	12.74	#9
Russell worked on getting Candice to join his alliance as he correctly thought Sandra would flip to the Heroes alliance.: Reward challenge: The castaways would be split into teams of three and would play a version of shuffleboard. Each castaway would be given two pucks which they would try to slide closest to the target. The team whose puck ends up closest to the target would win an overnight trip to the former home of Robert Louis Stevenson and a screening of the 1934 version of Treasure Island. Shoot 'n' Shuffle challenge originally from The Amazon also used in Vanuatu and Tocantins.; The Reward Challenge was won by the team of Amanda, Colby, and Danielle. While on the reward, Danielle found a clue to a Hidden Immunity Idol in a bowl of popcorn. Amanda grabbed the clue after Danielle tried to hide it. The two women fought over who should have the clue until Colby intervened and said that Danielle should have it since she found it. When the trio returned to camp the next day, Danielle related the story of the fight for the idol clue to her alliance and they set off to find it. Russell found the Hidden Immunity Idol without the girls noticing and hid his discovery from them. In order to secure her loyalty, Russell showed the idol to Candice and told her that they would go to the final three together. Sandra discussed flipping to the Heroes alliance with Colby and Rupert in order to get rid of Russell. Russell told Sandra that one of the Heroes had already flipped to the Villains alliance and warned her about flipping to Heroes alliance, foiling Sandra's plan of flipping to the Heroes.: Immunity challenge: The castaways would attempt to build a tower out of 150 wooden tiles to a height of 10 feet (3.0 m). The first castaway to finish building the tower to the required height wins immunity. House of Cards challenge from Gabon.; The Immunity Challenge was won by Jerri. Russell wanted to vote out Amanda and he told Candice to vote for Amanda, which she agreed to. She then told Russell that the Heroes along with Sandra were planning to vote him out. Russell confronted Sandra about what Candice told him, but Sandra denied any switch in alliances. Sandra then confronted Candice about her telling Russell about the Heroes plan and that they had to stick to the plan in order to vote out Russell. The Heroes agreed to vote for Parvati in case Danielle or Russell played a Hidden Immunity Idol. At Tribal Council, Russell played his Hidden Immunity Idol, but no votes against him were cast. Candice flipped to the Villains alliance and Sandra stuck with the Villains, resulting in Amanda being sent to the jury.
301	12	"A Sinking Ship"	7.7/14	4.1/14	May 6, 2010	13.06	#8
Back at camp after Tribal Council, Colby and Rupert were upset about Candice's flip to the Villains side, while Jerri was ready to vote her out now that her vote was no longer needed and was worried she would flip back to the Heroes side. Rupert and Russell confronted each other in front of the entire tribe, which made Russell target Rupert for the next Tribal Council. When the castaways arrived for the challenge, Jeff announced that they would be playing for immunity instead of reward. After explaining the challenge, Jeff stated that there would be a twist at the end.: Immunity challenge: The castaways would stand on a perch, one arm above their head with their wrist tethered to a bucket of water on top of a platform. The castaway who could stand there the longest without tipping the bucket would win. During the challenge, Jeff would tempt the castaways to quit with offerings of cookies and milk; donuts and iced coffee; peanut butter and jelly sandwiches, chips, candy, and milk. When It Rains, It Pours challenge from Africa, All-Stars and Micronesia.; Just as she had done when she last played this challenge during Survivor: Micronesia, Parvati outlasted everybody to win Individual Immunity. The twist was that Jeff read a clue to a Hidden Immunity Idol to the entire tribe. When the castaways returned to camp, everybody went looking for the Hidden Immunity Idol. Sandra found it and hid it from the others. Rupert stuck a rock in his pocket to feign finding the idol. Russell fell for the deception and his alliance plotted a way to get Rupert to play the idol by splitting the vote at the next Tribal Council. Colby and Rupert knew that the Villains alliance would split their vote between Rupert, Colby or Candice, so they agreed to vote for Candice, hoping the Villains would pick her for the split. At Tribal Council, the Villains ultimately chose Candice and split their votes between her and Rupert. According to plan, Rupert and Colby voted for Candice, sending her to the jury. When the tribe returned to camp, Russell criticized the girls in his alliance that they should have split their votes between Colby and Rupert instead of focusing on Candice.: Immunity challenge: In the first round, the castaways would dig up a wooden peg and then guide the peg through a table maze. The first five to finish would move on to the next round. In the second round, the castaways would use four pegs to climb a wall. The first three to reach the top of the wall would move to the final round. The final round would be a sliding puzzle. The first castaway to finish their puzzle would win. Wall to Wall challenge from Panama.; At the Immunity Challenge, Rupert, Sandra, Russell, Parvati, and Danielle moved on from the first round. Russell, Parvati, and Rupert moved on to the final round. Russell finished his puzzle first to win Individual Immunity. Parvati wanted to vote out Rupert. Russell was concerned that Parvati was more loyal to Danielle than Parvati was to Russell, so he decided to break them up by discussing voting out Parvati with Danielle and telling Parvati that Danielle wanted to vote her out when it came down to five or six remaining. Danielle and Parvati discussed Russell's stories to them and they figured out that Russell was trying to break them up. The two begged Jerri to vote for Rupert to foil Russell's plan. Meanwhile, Russell decided to get Danielle out of the game so that Parvati would stay loyal to him by telling Colby and Rupert that Danielle needed to go out next. Russell threatened Jerri to vote out Danielle by telling Jerri she would be voted out next if Danielle didn't go. At Tribal Council, Danielle and Russell argued over what the other had said to each other. Danielle broke into tears and unintentionally revealed that Jerri was not included in the Final 3 alliance of herself, Parvati and Russell. Russell's plan came to fruition when Jerri switched her vote and Danielle was eliminated as the next juror, becoming the first villain voted out since the merge.
302	13	"Loose Lips Sink Ships"	7.7/13	4.1/13	May 13, 2010	13.28	#11
The tree mail on day 34 was a Sprint Palm Pre loaded with videos from family members (Parvati's dad, Mike; Jerri's sister, Jennifer; Russell's wife, Melanie; Colby's brother, Reed; Rupert's wife, Laura; and Sandra's uncle, Fernando) announcing that they had arrived on the island and were looking forward to reuniting with the castaways at the next challenge.: Reward challenge: The castaways would use a bucket to scoop water from the ocean and then toss the water to their loved one who would use another bucket to catch the water. The loved one would then pour the water into a bucket hanging from a see saw. The first pair to fill their bucket with enough water to tip their see saw would win a plane trip with their loved one to see the Alofaaga Blowholes along with a meal of hamburgers, soft drinks, cookies, and donuts. Pass the Bucket challenge from Cook Islands.; After emotional introductions to the castaway's loved ones, the challenge was won by the team of Jerri and her sister Jennifer. After winning the challenge, Jeff told Jerri that she could pick another castaway and their loved one to go along with them. Jerri chose Parvati and her father Mike. Jerri then asked Jeff if she could take one more pair. Jeff agreed and Jerri picked Sandra and her uncle. Russell was angry that Jerri did not pick him and his wife to join them on the trip. During the trip, Jerri voiced concern that Russell would seek revenge on her for not selecting him for the trip. Parvati and Sandra said they would protect her from any retaliation and that Russell had to vote out either Colby or Rupert in order to stay in the game. Back at camp, Russell was indeed plotting to seek revenge by making an agreement with Colby and Rupert to go to the final three with them. Russell thought he could swing Jerri over to this new alliance and vote out Parvati if she did not win the next Immunity Challenge. During the night of day 35 after the three women returned from their reward, Rupert angered Jerri by making a racket while the rest of the tribe was trying to sleep and she wanted to vote him out next.: Immunity challenge: The castaways would hold two poles on the tops of their hands up against a board over their heads. Any movement in their hands would cause the poles to drop to the ground. If the castaway drops their poles, they would be eliminated from the challenge. The last person who does not drop their poles would win immunity. Keep It Up challenge from Gabon.; Russell's new alliance's plan was spoiled when Parvati won the Immunity Challenge. With his plan spoiled, Russell decided he had to flip back to his original girls alliance and vote out Rupert. Sandra told Rupert that she wanted to vote out Russell. Rupert told this to Russell, and Russell then confronted Sandra in front of Parvati asking if she was with him or against him. Sandra replied that she was against him and then yelled out to Rupert about revealing her plan to Russell. Russell scolded Parvati and Sandra about being dumb when they made fun of him and changed his mind yet again to vote out Sandra. At Tribal Council, the argument between Russell and Sandra was discussed. Before reading the votes, Jeff stated that this is the last time the Hidden Immunity Idol could be played. Though Sandra thought she was safe going in and wouldn't need to play her Hidden Immunity Idol, she decided to play it since she had mixed feelings after the discussion. The Heroes’ votes against Sandra were not counted. The rest were all cast against Rupert and he was sent to the jury.
303	14	"Anything Could Happen"	7.2/12	Unknown	May 16, 2010	13.46	#9
Back at camp after Tribal Council, Russell was upset at Sandra's use of the Hidden Immunity Idol and accused Parvati and Sandra of lying to him about Sandra having a Hidden Immunity Idol.: Immunity challenge: The castaways would balance ceramic dishes on the end of a balancing arm. As the challenge progresses, Jeff calls out different dishwares that the castaways would stack on the far end of the balance. Should any part of a castaway's stack fall, that castaway would be out of the challenge. The last castaway in the challenge would win. Offer It Up challenge from China.; Parvati won the Immunity Challenge by outlasting Colby. After returning from the challenge, Colby gave his "surrender speech" to the Villains and told them they should just enjoy the day and he would not scramble to stay in the game. However, Colby made one final attempt to stay in the game by approaching Russell about voting out Sandra in an effort to defeat Parvati at the next Immunity Challenge. At Tribal Council, the Villains voted out the last of the Heroes, unanimously sending Colby to the jury. The final four received treemail announcing that they would take the traditional journey honoring the castaways voted out before heading to their final Immunity Challenge.: Immunity challenge: The castaways would have to navigate through a maze blindfolded. The first castaway to retrieve four necklaces at stations within the maze and then find the immunity necklace at the end of the maze would win. Blind Maze challenge from The Amazon.; Russell won the final Immunity Challenge by edging out Parvati and Jerri by mere inches. After the challenge, Russell told Sandra that he was going to take her to the final three as he thought he could beat her at the final vote as she would get maybe only one vote. Parvati disagreed and told Russell that getting rid of Sandra would be best as she would get votes from the jury. At Tribal Council, Jerri was voted out and became the final member of the jury. Parvati, Russell, and Sandra celebrated with the traditional Day 39 breakfast. Unknowingly paying homage to Russell's arrogance, atrocious gameplay, and refusal to bathe, Sandra tossed Russell's hat into the camp fire in retaliation. The three burned down the camp and set off for the final Tribal Council. At the final Tribal Council, the jury questioned and lectured the final three on their strategic plays, their perceptions among the jury, what they would have done differently during the game, their loyalties, and how they played the game. The members of the jury made their dislike of Russell and his unlikelihood of receiving votes very clear; the other two finalists used this in their attempts to sway the jury. Parvati told the jury that she used Russell and "kept him as her pet" while Sandra said that she lobbied for Russell's removal since day one.
304	15	"The Reunion"	5.9/10	Unknown	May 16, 2010	10.65	#22
Months later, Sandra was revealed as the season's winner after receiving votes from the five Heroes and Courtney, while Parvati placed second with Coach, Danielle, and Jerri's votes, and Russell placed third after not receiving any votes. The castaways discuss the season with host, Jeff Probst.

== Voting history ==
Survivor: Heroes vs. Villains voting history
	Original Tribes										Merged Tribe						
Episode	1	2	3	4	5	6		7	8	9	10	11	12		13	14	
Day	3	6	8	11	14	15		18	21	24	27	30	31	33	36	37	38
Tribe	Heroes	Heroes	Villains	Heroes	Heroes	Villains	Heroes	Villains	Villains	Villains	Yin Yang	Yin Yang	Yin Yang	Yin Yang	Yin Yang	Yin Yang	Yin Yang
Eliminated	Sugar	Stephenie	Randy	Cirie	Tom	Tyson	James	Rob	Coach	Courtney	J.T.	Amanda	Candice	Danielle	Rupert	Colby	Jerri
Votes	9–1	6–3	9–1	3–2–0 (Note: Tom played a hidden immunity idol on himself, therefore three votes against him were not counted.)	5–2	3–2–0 (Note: Russell played a hidden immunity idol on Parvati, therefore four votes against her were not counted.)	5–1	4–3–1	4–3	5–1	5–0 (Note: Parvati played a hidden immunity idol on Jerri, therefore five votes against her were not counted.)	6–3	5–3	4–3	4–0 (Note: Sandra played a hidden immunity idol on herself, therefore two votes against her were not counted.)	4–1	3–1
Voter	Vote																
Sandra			Randy			Russell		Russell	Coach	Courtney	J.T.	Amanda	Candice	Rupert	Rupert	Colby	Jerri
Parvati			Randy			Tyson		Rob	Coach	Courtney	J.T.	Amanda	Rupert	Rupert	Rupert	Colby	Jerri
Russell			Randy			Tyson		Rob	Courtney	Courtney	J.T.	Amanda	Candice	Danielle	Rupert	Colby	Jerri
Jerri			Randy			~~Parvati~~		Rob	Courtney	Courtney	J.T.	Amanda	Candice	Danielle	Rupert	Colby	Parvati
Colby	Sugar	Amanda		Cirie	James		James				~~Jerri~~	Parvati	Candice	Danielle	~~Sandra~~	Sandra	
Rupert	Sugar	Stephenie		Colby	Tom		James				~~Jerri~~	Parvati	Candice	Danielle	~~Sandra~~		
Danielle			Randy			Tyson		Rob	Coach	Courtney	J.T.	Amanda	Rupert	Rupert			
Candice	Sugar	Stephenie		~~Tom~~	Tom		James				~~Jerri~~	Amanda	Rupert				
Amanda	Sugar	Stephenie		~~Tom~~	Tom		James				~~Jerri~~	Parvati					
J.T.	Sugar	Stephenie		Cirie	Tom		James				~~Jerri~~						
Courtney			Randy			~~Parvati~~		Russell	Coach	Jerri							
Coach			Randy			~~Parvati~~		Courtney	Courtney								
Rob			Randy			Russell		Russell									
James	Sugar	Stephenie		Colby	Tom		Colby										
Tyson			Randy			~~Parvati~~											
Tom	Sugar	Amanda		Cirie	James												
Cirie	Sugar	Stephenie		~~Tom~~													
Randy			Rob														
Stephenie	Sugar	Amanda															
Sugar	Amanda																

Jury vote
Episode	15		
Day	39		
Finalist	Sandra	Parvati	Russell
Votes	6–3–0		
Jerri		Yes	
Colby	Yes		
Rupert	Yes		
Danielle		Yes	
Candice	Yes		
Amanda	Yes		
J.T.	Yes		
Courtney	Yes		
Coach		Yes	

== Production ==
=== Filming ===
Unlike previous seasons where a break in production occurred between seasons, the twentieth season was shot twenty days after Survivor: Samoa was completed, taking advantage of the existing infrastructure from that season. Casting for Heroes vs. Villains was done simultaneously with casting for Survivor: Samoa. Heroes vs. Villains features ten former Survivors known for their acts of integrity and honor, the Heroes, and ten former Survivors known for their deeds of deception and duplicity, the Villains. The cast was officially announced during the 36th People's Choice Awards on January 6, 2010. Jeff Probst, the show's host, stated that while they wanted to do another season where they brought back former players for the show's ten-year anniversary and 20th cycle, they did not want to simply do another All-Stars season. On reflecting on the most popular players, they realized that these players were either seen as liked or despised for those respective seasons, and opted to use that as the theme for this season. While the players were classified as Heroes or Villains, Survivor's creator Mark Burnett did not expect these players to maintain these roles in the game, but rather to do what they need to survive to the end. Rather than the usual slogan "Outwit, Outplay, Outlast", the slogan for this season is "Return, Revenge, Redemption" as in case with Survivor: China. All challenges in this season were based on challenges used in previous seasons.

The 2009 Samoa earthquake and tsunami occurred shortly after the completion of filming for this season; a CBS spokesperson stated that no crew members were harmed from it.

=== Casting ===
According to host and producer Jeff Probst, the production initially selected 50 players from past seasons, narrowing down the list to twenty and keeping one spot open for a possible player from Survivor: Samoa. Some selections were made to match players that production thought would be exciting to see together, according to casting director Lynne Spillman.

Over the years, several notable omissions have been directly addressed by Probst, the production team, and former contestants. While Richard Hatch, winner of the original Survivor, was asked to return for this season, he had to apply to leave the country since he was under house arrest at the time, and his request was denied by a federal judge in Rhode Island. In an interview with Entertainment Weekly days before filming began, Probst revealed that Cook Islands winner Yul Kwon, Michael Skupin of The Australian Outback, and Terry Deitz of Panama had been considered for the "Heroes" tribe but were ultimately not chosen; Kwon, Skupin, and Deitz returned for Survivor: Winners at War, Survivor: Philippines, and Survivor: Cambodia, respectively.

He also said that they had considered having Ozzy Lusth of Cook Islands and Micronesia compete for a third time, but had ultimately decided against it; Lusth returned for Survivor: South Pacific three seasons later, and again for Survivor: Game Changers in 2017 and Survivor 50: In the Hands of the Fans in 2026. Thailand winner Brian Heidik was in talks to participate in this season, but Probst and other producers felt "too repulsed" to include him. Probst also revealed that the producers would have liked Elisabeth Hasselbeck from The Australian Outback and Colleen Haskell from Borneo to participate on this season, but knew neither of them would have accepted the offer.

Another notable omission was that of Jonny Fairplay of Pearl Islands and Micronesia, which led Probst to say that Fairplay was a "Survivor quitter" after asking to be voted off first in Micronesia, and quitters are not asked back. Shane Powers of Panama was cut and replaced by Russell Hantz of Survivor: Samoa. However, Jonathan Penner, of Cook Islands and Micronesia, claimed that his spot was revoked in favor of Hantz, but he did later return for Survivor: Philippines. Yau-Man Chan of Fiji and Micronesia and Corinne Kaplan of Gabon were asked to return, but both declined due to work commitments. Kaplan was replaced by Danielle DiLorenzo, and eventually returned for Survivor: Caramoan. Natalie Bolton and Erik Reichenbach, both of Micronesia, were alternates, with Bolton being on location. Reichenbach later returned for Survivor: Caramoan.

According to episodes of the podcast Talking with T-Bird, Judd Sergeant of Survivor: Guatemala and Shii-Ann Huang of Thailand and All-Stars were both in the casting process for this season as well. Randy Bailey said that Ace Gordon of Gabon was close to coming back for this season as a member of the Villains tribe, but he was ultimately not chosen. Coby Archa of Palau said that his castmate from that season, Ian Rosenberger, attended casting finals. Fiji winner Earl Cole was also considered for this season. Jenna Lewis of Borneo and All-Stars was considered for the Villains tribe. Lewis (now Lewis-Dougherty) did eventually return for Survivor 50: In the Hands of the Fans. It was also revealed by both Candice Cody and Parvati Shallow that Cody was originally supposed to be on the Villains tribe, and Shallow on the Heroes tribe. Sierra Reed of Tocantins was originally going to be a member of the Heroes tribe, but had to step down because she got engaged to a producer from her season.

== Reception ==
Survivor: Heroes vs. Villains was met with universal acclaim, and is generally considered to be one of the show's best seasons. Entertainment Weekly's Survivor columnist Dalton Ross ranked Heroes vs. Villains as the third-best season of the series, only behind Survivor: Borneo and Survivor: Micronesia (both tied for first); he cited such memorable aspects as "the Russell vs. Boston Rob feud...Tyson voting himself off, J.T. giving Russell his immunity idol, and Parvati handing out two immunity idols at one Tribal Council." Ever since 2012, Survivor fan site "Survivor Oz" has consistently ranked Heroes vs. Villains at or near the #1 spot of its annual poll ranking all seasons of the series – it was #1 in 2012, 2013, and 2015, while it was #2 in 2014 (behind Survivor: Cagayan). The Wire and "The Purple Rock Podcast" both also rank Heroes vs. Villains as the greatest season of the series, while Examiner.com ranks it as the second best season behind Survivor: Borneo, and Zap2it ranks it as the 7th-best season. In 2015, former Survivor contestant and podcast host Rob Cesternino's website saw Heroes vs. Villains ranked as the #1 greatest season of the series, both by Cesternino himself and by the website's fan poll. The season was still ranked #1 in 2021 during Cesternino's podcast, Survivor All-Time Top 40 Rankings. In 2020, Inside Survivor ranked this season as the show's second-best out of the first 40, saying,"Heroes vs. Villains works so well despite the theme's silliness because of how so many cast members fully lean into their designated roles, regardless of how accurate they are. It is Survivor at its most theatrical, and everyone comes to Samoa ready to play their parts." In 2021, Kristen Kranz of Collider also ranked Heroes vs. Villains as the second-best season of the series, writing, "Labeling one group heroes and the other villains was a brilliant strategy for this season of all-star returning players. Not only did we get to watch the villains try to out-villain each other, but we also watched as the heroes considered their methods and play around with the villain role a bit this time around," adding that the season's players "were the cream of the crop," and that, "Usually, contestants get to decide for themselves which side they belong on, but this season was a chance to prove whether these players were worth the title of hero or villain and if they would change sides if the opportunity presented itself." In 2024, Nick Caruso of TVLine ranked this season 2nd out of 47.

Critics considered the season to be a strong contender for the Primetime Emmy Award for Outstanding Reality-Competition Program at the 62nd Primetime Emmy Awards, but it was not nominated. Newsweek, IGN, The Hollywood Reporter, and Entertainment Weekly all listed this omission as one of the biggest Emmy snubs for the year.

In the official CBS Watch issue commemorating the 15th anniversary of Survivor, Heroes vs. Villains performed extremely well across all six major polls that were held. It was voted by viewers the #1 greatest season of the series; Sandra's burning of Russell's hat in the final episode was voted the #1 most memorable moment, and Parvati's handing out two immunity idols in the 10th episode was #8 on the same list (thus making this the only season to have more than one entry in that particular list); five of the top ten contestants voted by viewers as the greatest were in this season (Mariano, Hantz, Shallow, Diaz-Twine, and Fields); the final immunity challenge of the season was voted the #5 most unforgettable challenge; and in the "most attractive" polls for both males and females, Donaldson ranked second in the male category, while in the female category, Shallow ranked second, Kimmel ranked fourth, and Woodcock ranked sixth (thus tying with Micronesia for the highest amount of entries in the female category).

In a 2015 interview, Jeff Probst admitted that, if Borneo is not taken into consideration, Heroes vs. Villains would tie with Cagayan as his personal favorite Survivor season.

Additionally, Hantz received a nomination in the 2010 Teen Choice Awards for his performance on this season.
