= Survivor: Tocantins =

- Season 18
- Region 1 DVD cover
- Presented by: Jeff Probst
- No. of days: 39
- No. of castaways: 16
- Winner: James "J.T." Thomas Jr.
- Runner-up: Stephen Fishbach
- Location: Jalapão, Tocantins, Brazil
- Sprint Player of the Season: James "J.T." Thomas Jr.
- No. of episodes: 15

Release
- Original network: CBS
- Original release: February 12 – May 17, 2009

Additional information
- Filming dates: November 2 – December 10, 2008

Season chronology
- ← Previous; Gabon — Earth's Last Eden Next → Samoa

Survivor: Tocantins – The Brazilian Highlands (commonly referred to as Survivor: Tocantins) is the eighteenth season of the American CBS competitive reality television series Survivor. The season was filmed in the microregion of Jalapão in Tocantins, Brazil, and first aired Thursday, February 12, 2009.

James "J.T." Thomas Jr. was named the winner in the final episode on May 17, 2009, defeating Stephen Fishbach in a unanimous vote. In addition, J.T. was named "Sprint Player of the Season", earning the fans' vote over Tamara "Taj" Johnson-George and Sierra Reed. Thomas was the second player to win the game by a unanimous vote, following Earl Cole of Survivor: Fiji, but the first to receive no votes throughout the season in addition to a unanimous jury vote. This would be the last season to feature a final two until the twenty-eighth season, Survivor: Cagayan.

== Format ==
Survivor is a reality television show based on the Swedish show Expedition Robinson, created by Mark Burnett and Charlie Parsons. The series follows a number of participants isolated in a remote location, where they must provide food, fire, and shelter. One participant is removed from the series by majority vote every three days, with challenges held to give a reward (ranging from living- and food-related prizes to a car) and immunity from being voted out of the series. The last remaining player receives a prize of $1,000,000.

== Contestants ==
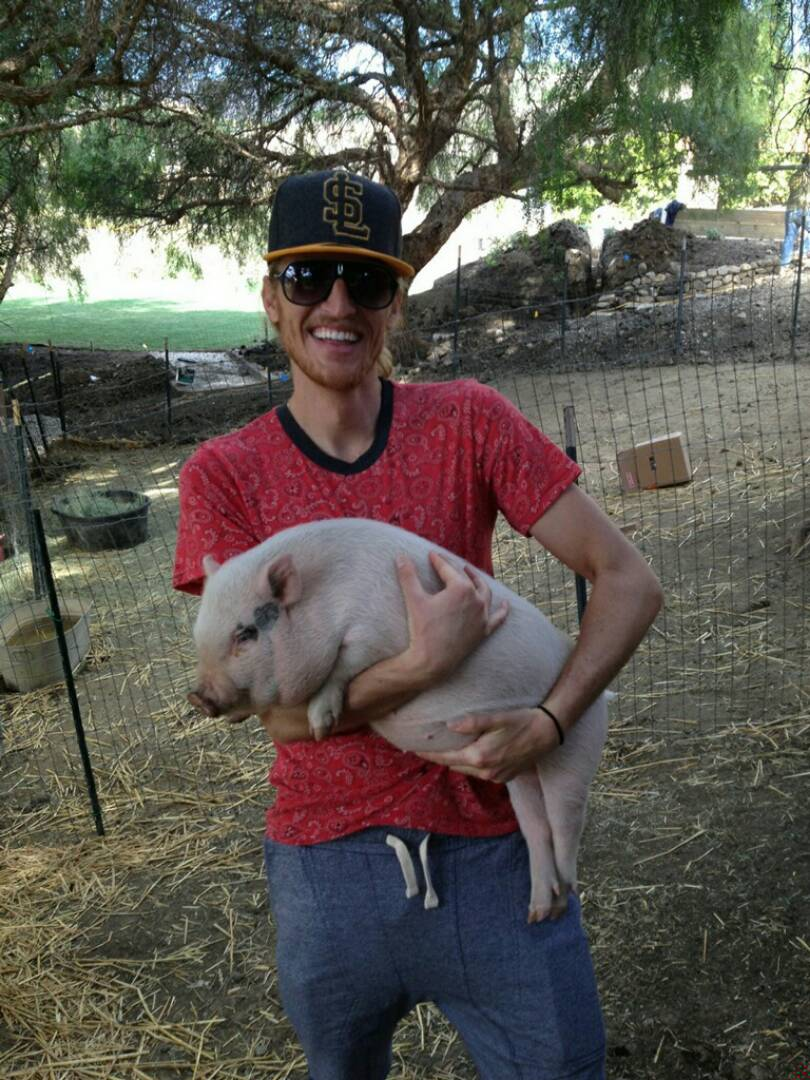
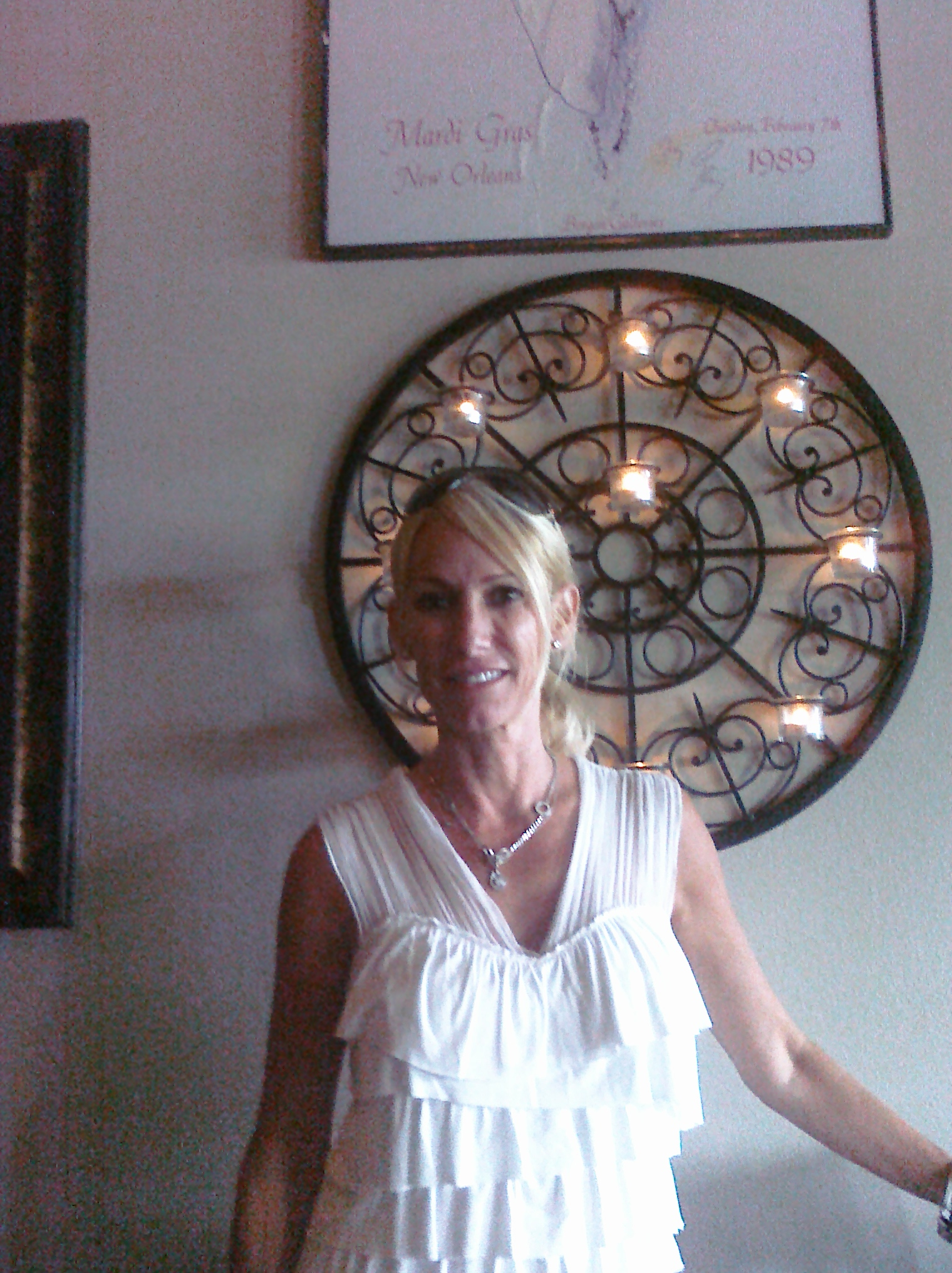
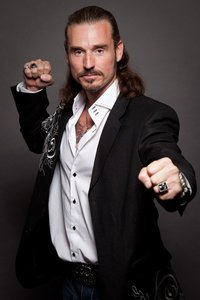
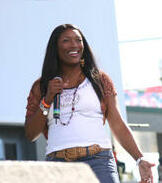
From left to right: Tyson Apostol, Debbie Beebe, Benjamin "Coach" Wade, and Tamara "Taj" Johnson-George

The cast is composed of 16 new players, initially splitting into two tribes. The tribes are Jalapao and Timbira. The merged tribe Forza means "Force" in Italian. Notable cast includes SWV band member Tamara Johnson-George, and Miss USA 2003 contestant and Miss Ohio USA 2003 Candace Smith.

List of Survivor: Tocantins - The Brazilian Highlands contestants
Contestant	Age	From	Tribe		Finish	
Contestant	Age	From	Original	Merged	Placement	Day
Carolina Eastwood	26	West Hollywood, California	Jalapao		1st voted out	Day 3
Candace Smith	31	Los Angeles, California	Timbira		2nd voted out	Day 6
Jerry Sims	49	Rock Hill, South Carolina	Timbira		3rd voted out	Day 9
Sandy Burgin	53	Louisville, Kentucky	Jalapao		4th voted out	Day 12
Spencer Duhm	19	Gainesville, Florida	Jalapao		5th voted out	Day 15
Sydney Wheeler	24	San Diego, California	Jalapao		6th voted out	Day 18
Joe Dowdle	26	Austin, Texas	Jalapao	Forza	Medically evacuated	Day 20
Brendan Synnott	30	Vail, Colorado	Timbira	Forza	7th voted out 1st jury member	Day 24
Tyson Apostol	29	Heber City, Utah	Timbira	Forza	8th voted out 2nd jury member	Day 27
Sierra Reed	23	Los Angeles, California	Timbira	Forza	9th voted out 3rd jury member	Day 30
Debra "Debbie" Beebe	46	Auburn, Alabama	Timbira	Forza	10th voted out 4th jury member	Day 33
Benjamin "Coach" Wade	37	Bolivar, Missouri	Timbira	Forza	11th voted out 5th jury member	Day 36
Tamara "Taj" Johnson-George	37	Nashville, Tennessee	Jalapao	Forza	12th voted out 6th jury member	Day 37
Erinn Lobdell	26	Milwaukee, Wisconsin	Timbira	Forza	13th voted out 7th jury member	Day 38
Stephen Fishbach	29	New York City, New York	Jalapao	Forza	Runner-up	Day 39
James "J.T." Thomas Jr.	24	Mobile, Alabama	Jalapao	Forza	Sole Survivor	Day 39

=== Future appearances ===
James "J.T." Thomas Jr., Benjamin "Coach" Wade, and Tyson Apostol later returned for Survivor: Heroes vs. Villains. Wade returned for his third time on Survivor: South Pacific. Apostol returned for his third time on Survivor: Blood vs. Water with his girlfriend Rachel Foulger. Stephen Fishbach returned for Survivor: Cambodia. Thomas returned for his third time on Survivor: Game Changers. Apostol returned to compete on Survivor: Winners at War. Wade competed for a fourth time on Survivor 50: In the Hands of the Fans.

Outside of Survivor, Apostol competed on the first season of The Challenge: USA and on the third season of House of Villains.

== Season summary ==
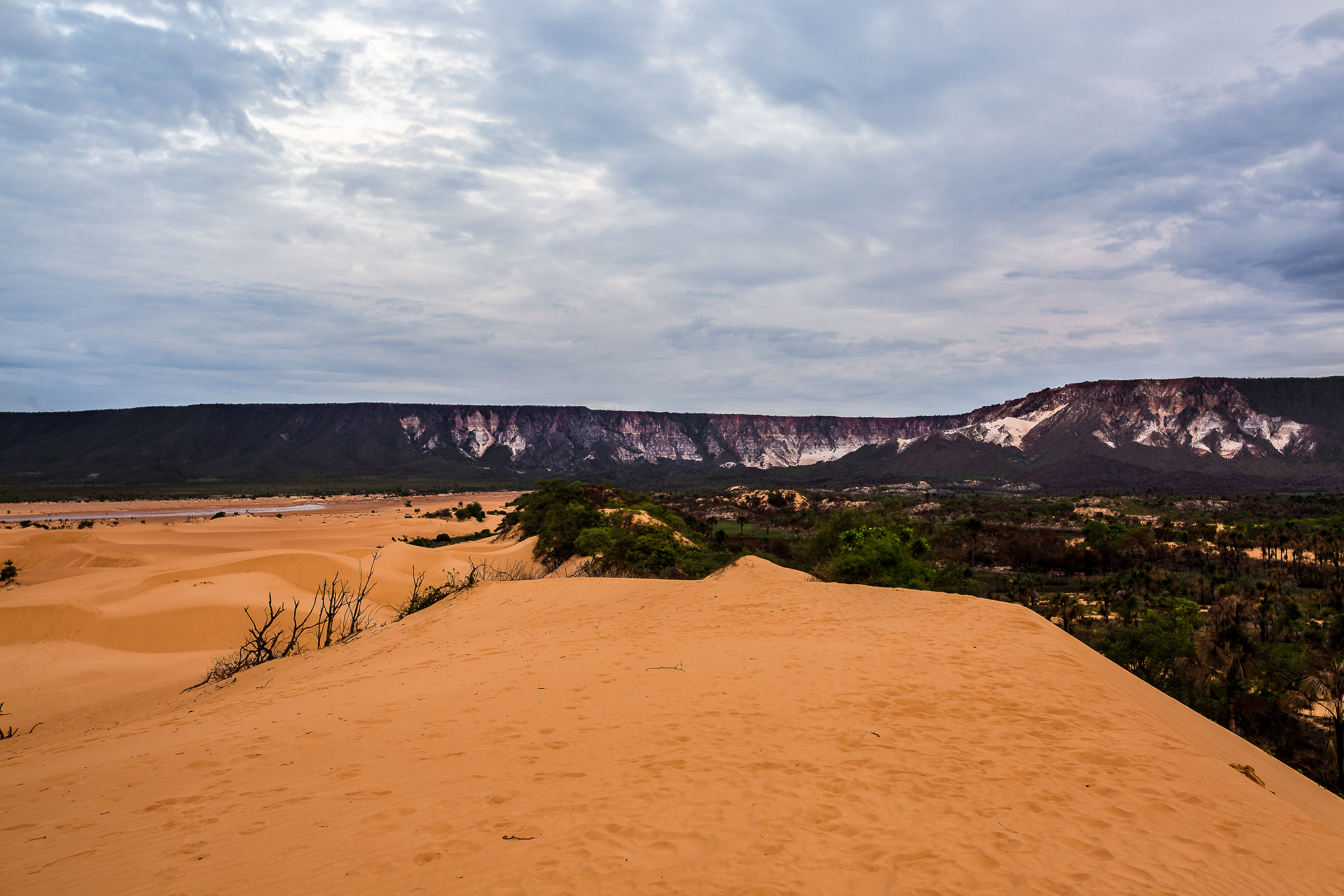
The season filmed in Jalapão in the Tocantins.

The players were split into two tribes, Timbira and Jalapao, prior to the game. However, before the game started, Jeff stated that each tribe was to vote for one of their own to not make the trek to camp. The selected members, Sierra from Timbira and Sandy from Jalapao, assumed they had been eliminated, but it was then revealed that these two would be flown to their respective campsites while the rest had to trek for four hours while carrying supplies. Ultimately, Sandy was eliminated pre-merge, but not before her tribemate Carolina was ousted first. Sierra made the jury.

Both the hidden immunity idol and Exile were in play, with the clues to the hidden idols available at Exile. The winning tribe of each reward challenge would be able to select one member of the losing tribe to be exiled, while the exiled player would be able to choose a member of the winning tribe to join them. Brendan from Timbira and Taj from Jalapao formed a secret cross-tribe alliance for the merge, bringing in Sierra and Stephen, respectively. The alliance members saw several repeat visits to Exile, securing both immunity idols by sharing the clues. After J.T. accidentally stumbled upon the hidden immunity idol in Stephen's pocket, Taj and Stephen agreed to bring J.T. into their own alliance, and the three decided to share the use of the hidden immunity idol. Timbira was able to win the last three tribal Immunity Challenges, leaving Taj, J.T., Stephen, and Joe as the only Jalapao members remaining. Shortly after the merge, Joe was evacuated from the game due to an infection in his knee.

After Joe's evacuation, Timbira had a major numerical advantage on Jalapao, up six players to three. However, Timbira had divided into several factions: Coach, Tyson, and Debbie, Brendan and Sierra, and Erinn on the outside. Coach's faction decided to align with J.T. and Stephen in an attempt to overthrow Brendan and Sierra. With Brendan and Sierra acting distant, Taj and Stephen decided to betray their Exile alliance; Brendan did not play his idol and was voted out. With the dissent among Timbira exposed, J.T., Stephen, and Taj aligned with Erinn, navigating between the two Timbira factions to eliminate them all, becoming the Final Four.

After knocking Taj out of the game due to her likelihood of winning the jury's vote, J.T. eliminated Erinn after he won his third consecutive immunity challenge, bringing Stephen to the Final Tribal Council. Stephen's poor Final Tribal Council performance combined with J.T.'s likability led the jury unanimously to vote for J.T. to be named Sole Survivor, believing J.T. played a stronger game compared to Stephen.

Challenge winners and eliminations by episode
Episode			Challenge winner(s)		Exile Island	Eliminated	
No.	Title	Original air date	Reward	Immunity	Exile Island	Tribe	Player
1	"Let's Get Rid of the Weak Players Before We Even Start"	February 12, 2009	Timbira		None	Jalapao	Carolina
2	"The Poison Apple Needs to Go"	February 19, 2009	Jalapao		Brendan (Timbira)	Timbira	Candace
2	"The Poison Apple Needs to Go"	February 19, 2009	Jalapao		Taj (Jalapao)	Timbira	Candace
3	"Mama Said There'd Be Days Like This"	February 26, 2009	Jalapao	Jalapao	Brendan (Timbira)	Timbira	Jerry
3	"Mama Said There'd Be Days Like This"	February 26, 2009	Jalapao	Jalapao	Taj (Jalapao)	Timbira	Jerry
4	"The Strongest Man Alive"	March 5, 2009	Jalapao	Timbira	Sierra (Timbira)	Jalapao	Sandy
4	"The Strongest Man Alive"	March 5, 2009	Jalapao	Timbira	Taj (Jalapao)	Jalapao	Sandy
5	"You're Going to Want that Tooth"	March 12, 2009	Jalapao	Timbira	Brendan (Timbira)	Jalapao	Spencer
5	"You're Going to Want that Tooth"	March 12, 2009	Jalapao	Timbira	Stephen (Jalapao)	Jalapao	Spencer
6	"The First Fifteen Days"	March 25, 2009	Recap Episode				
7	"One of Those 'Coach Moments'"	April 2, 2009	Timbira	Timbira	Joe (Jalapao)	Jalapao	Sydney
7	"One of Those 'Coach Moments'"	April 2, 2009	Timbira	Timbira	Erinn (Timbira)	Jalapao	Sydney
8	"The Dragon Slayer"	April 9, 2009	None (Note: There was no reward challenge or exiling due to the merge.)	Tyson	None	Forza	Joe
9	"The Biggest Fraud in the Game"	April 16, 2009	Brendan, Debbie, J.T.	Tyson	Stephen	Forza	Brendan
10	"It's Funny When People Cry"	April 23, 2009	Debbie, Erinn, J.T., Tyson	Debbie	Stephen	Forza	Tyson
11	"They Both Went Bananas"	April 30, 2009	Stephen [J.T., Taj]	Coach	Erinn	Forza	Sierra
12	"The Ultimate Sacrifice"	May 7, 2009	Survivor Auction	Stephen	Taj	Forza	Debbie
13	"The Martyr Approach"	May 14, 2009	J.T. [Stephen]	J.T.	Coach	Forza	Coach
14	"I Trust You But I Trust Me More"	May 17, 2009	None	J.T.	None	Forza	Taj
14	"I Trust You But I Trust Me More"	May 17, 2009	None	J.T.	None	Forza	Erinn
15	"Reunion"	May 17, 2009					

In the case of multiple tribes or castaways who win reward or immunity, they are listed in order of finish, or alphabetically where it was a team effort; where one castaway won and invited others, the invitees are in brackets.

== Episodes ==
No. overall	No. in season	Title	Rating/share (household)	Rating/share (18-49)	Original release date	U.S. viewers (millions)	Weekly rank
259	1	"Let's Get Rid of the Weak Players Before We Even Start"	8.0/13	4.5/13	February 12, 2009	13.63	#12
With the castaways already split into tribes, they were dropped off by a truck in a clearing. The game started immediately with Jeff announcing that the tribes would have 60 seconds to gather as many supplies from the back of the truck as they could. Timbira took all of the water and bags of beans, leaving Jalapao with only some melons and a few other supplies. Jeff then announced that the tribe's campsites were about a 4-hour trek by foot away, that one person from each tribe "would not be making the journey" and a vote would take place immediately. Jalapao voted for Sandy and Timbira voted for Sierra. Sandy and Sierra thought they were being voted out the game, but Jeff announced that they would only not be making the trek to camp and instead would be flown to their campsites by helicopter. When Sandy and Sierra arrived at their respective campsites, they were given the option to start setting up camp or follow clues to a disposable Hidden Immunity Idol that can only be used during their tribe's first Tribal Council. Sandy opted to follow the clues but did not find the idol before her tribe arrived. Sierra opted to start setting up the camp in order to improve her impression with her tribe. Carolina was annoyed that Sandy didn't work on the campsite. Timbira's trek did not end until dark, by which time Sierra had built a shelter big enough to house the entire tribe. Despite her hard work, Coach’s view on Sierra did not change and he still wanted to vote her out first. On day 2, Sandy resumed her search for the Hidden Immunity Idol but was stumped by the second clue.: Reward/Immunity Challenge: Six members of each tribe would race across a series of sand hills and into a river to retrieve a raft with puzzle planks tied to it. When all six members of the tribe returned to shore with the raft, the puzzle planks could be untied and taken back to the start line. The two remaining tribe members would assemble the planks into a staircase. Once all of the tribe was at the top of the staircase, any two tribe members would work together to navigate a peg through a table maze, which would release the tribe's flag to win flint and immunity.; At the Reward/Immunity Challenge, Sandy gave Jalapao a huge lead by building the staircase quickly. However, Brendan and Erinn quickly caught up and solved the table maze for a comeback victory for Timbira. Back at Jalapao's camp, Carolina's bossy personality rubbed some people the wrong way, while Sandy's effort at the challenge earned high praise from her tribemates. Still worried about being voted out, Sandy went searching for the Hidden Immunity Idol before Tribal Council but was again unsuccessful. At Tribal Council, Jalapao decided that Carolina should leave due to her bossy personality and she was unanimously voted out. Before sending the tribe back to camp, Jeff gave them flint.
260	2	"The Poison Apple Needs to Go"	7.8/12	4.5/12	February 19, 2009	13.59	#11
In a quest for protein, the Jalapao tribe broke open a termite mound to eat the termites. At Timbira, Sierra decided that she needed help following the clues to the special first-Tribal-Council-only Hidden Immunity Idol and she recruited Brendan in the search. Together they went to the beach to follow the clues but were caught digging a large hole on the beach by Debbie and had to stop their search. Sierra came up with the cover story that she and Brendan were building a fire pit for the tribe that night, which Debbie believed and relayed to the rest of the tribe. Candace and Coach argued over how to cook the afternoon meal on day 5. Back at Jalapao, Taj told her tribe that she was married to famed football player Eddie George. At the start of the rain-soaked Reward/Immunity Challenge, Jeff announced that someone from the losing tribe would go to Exile Island. He added that there was a clue to the Hidden Immunity Idol at Exile Island, and a twist would be revealed after the challenge.: Reward/Immunity Challenge: Three castaways from each tribe would face off against each other in a river to retrieve a ball and throw it into their tribe's net to score a point. The first tribe to score three points would win tribal Immunity and fishing gear consisting of a spear, two poles, fishing line, fishing hooks, a cast net, tackle box, a diving mask, and a knife.; Jalapao overcame a 2–0 deficit to win the challenge and chose to send Brendan to Exile Island. Jeff announced the twist was that Brendan could choose one person from the winning tribe to join him on Exile Island; he chose Taj. J.T. and Stephen put their newly acquired fishing gear to use but did not catch anything. On Exile Island, Brendan and Taj found two urns and each had to choose one. Brendan's urn contained two notes: the first note was a clue to the Hidden Immunity Idol which he could optionally share with Taj and the second note telling him that he could switch tribes if he wanted to. After some pestering by Taj, Brendan shared the clue with her and they realized that the clue hinted that there was a Hidden Immunity Idol back at each tribe's campsite. They agreed to work to get sent back to Exile Island together to collect more clues. At Timbira, Candace lobbied her tribemates to vote for Coach, but her negativity backfired on her and she became the target to vote out. When Brendan returned to Timbira's campsite, he lied to his tribemates telling them that Taj had the urn with the clue and that she went to look for the Hidden Immunity Idol on her own, but did not appear to have found it. At Tribal Council, Candace's lobbying to vote out Coach could not overcome her negativity and she was voted out.
261	3	"Mama Said There'd Be Days Like This"	6.9/11	4.0/11	February 26, 2009	12.05	#11
Back at camp after Tribal Council, Erinn scrambled to realign herself with the rest of her tribe after Candace, with whom the tribe thought she was aligned, was voted out. Jerry started to develop stomach pains which he blamed on Timbira's diet of beans. At Jalapao, the tribe struggled with their casting net, only catching a few minnows, but had better luck with the fishing line and hooks.: Reward Challenge: Six castaways from each tribe would be blindfolded and tethered together in pairs. The remaining castaway would work as a caller to direct the paired tribemates through a maze. Each set of tribemates would have to locate a bucket in the maze, navigate the rest of the maze to a tower, fill the bucket with water from the tower, return to the beginning of the maze, and empty the bucket into a container which would raise a flag. Once the water container was filled enough to raise a flag, the process would have to be repeated again, this time filling the buckets with corn from a different tower. The first tribe to raise both flags would win a tarp, an umbrella, folding chairs, pillows, blankets, and a hammock.; At the Reward Challenge, Jalapao easily won and selected Brendan to return to Exile Island. As per their agreement the first time they went to Exile Island, Brendan selected Taj to return with him to Exile Island for the second time. On Exile Island, Brendan and Taj shared the next clue to the Hidden Immunity Idol, further cemented their secret alliance, and discussed bringing Sierra and Stephen into their cross-tribe alliance.: Immunity Challenge: In pairs, the castaways would race across a field to retrieve six large crates painted in their tribe's colors. Once all six crates were retrieved, the tribes would have to stack the crates into a staircase with the name of their tribe properly aligned along the sides. The first tribe to complete the staircase and get all of their members to the top of a platform climbing the staircase would win immunity. This challenge would later appear in Survivor: Heroes vs. Villains.; Jalapao secured their third challenge win in a row at the Immunity Challenge by coming from behind during the staircase assembly task. After returning to camp, Jerry's weakening condition made him a target for elimination. Coach was upset about Erinn's reaction after she realized Jerry was sick and he was likely to be voted off next. Coach tried to persuade Tyson, Sierra, and Debbie to keep Jerry and vote out Erinn, but Sierra did not want to "sever off another limb so we can get our vendetta's against Erinn" and cast her vote for Jerry. Tyson tried to get Jerry to stick it out and vote against Erinn. A few hours before Tribal Council and using the second clue to the Hidden Immunity Idol, Brendan found the Idol hidden within the statue next to the tree mail. At Tribal Council, Tyson looked for a blindside against Erinn, but the tribe could not ignore Jerry's illness and voted him out.
262	4	"The Strongest Man Alive"	7.0/11	3.9/10	March 5, 2009	11.85	#15
Back at camp after Tribal Council, Coach was angry at Erinn for saying that Brendan was a better leader than himself, but he eventually accepted it and anointed Brendan as tribe leader. At Jalapao, Taj told Stephen about her secret alliance with Brendan and told him that if Jalapao were to win the next Reward Challenge, they would need to choose Sierra to go to Exile Island, who would pick Stephen to go along. However, Brendan could not find the time and privacy to tell Sierra about the alliance.: Reward Challenge: Two men and one woman from each tribe would stand on perches holding a wooden pole on their shoulders to which weighted bags would be added. Every few minutes, two members of the opposing tribe would select someone to carry an additional 20 pounds (9.1 kg) of weight. If the weight becomes too much for a castaway, they would drop the pole and be out of the challenge. The last castaway standing would win for their tribe. The winning tribe would send two castaways to the losing tribe's camp where they would be allowed to steal two items.; At the Reward Challenge, Brendan, Tyson, and Debbie shouldered the weight for Timbira, and J.T., Joe, and Taj for Jalapao. Brendan dropped out first when he was about to carry 220 pounds (100 kg). Tyson dropped out next at 140 pounds (64 kg), leaving just Debbie for Timbira. J.T. carried 220 pounds (100 kg) before dropping out next, tying the weight carried by Rupert Boneham in Survivor: Pearl Islands. Moments later, Joe dropped out at 140 pounds (64 kg), leaving the two women to continue the challenge. Just as both women were to move to carrying 120 pounds (54 kg), Debbie dropped her pole, giving Jalapao their fourth straight challenge victory. In a rare show of sportsmanship for Survivor, Taj congratulated Debbie for a "hell of a job". Jalapao selected Sierra to go to Exile Island, but since Brendan did not tell Sierra of his alliance's plan, she immediately picked Taj to join her. Joe and J.T. arrived to raid the Timbira camp and they chose to take Timbira's larger sack of beans and a canister for water. Sandy derided the decision, stating that they should have taken both sacks of Timbira's beans. On Exile Island, Taj got the clue to the Hidden Immunity Idol, which told her it was hidden around the tree mail area. Taj told Sierra about her secret four-way alliance and Sierra readily agreed to join the alliance.: Immunity Challenge: One tribe member at a time would race along a winding path to retrieve a puzzle piece. Each puzzle piece is a large wooden triangular prism with letters written on each of the three faces. Once all eight puzzle pieces are retrieved, they would need to be placed in their correct spot in a frame. The pieces would then need to be rotated to display a scrambled phrase. The first tribe to solve their puzzle would win.; At the Immunity Challenge, Timbira broke Jalapao's winning streak. Before Tribal Council, Jalapao was undecided whether to vote out Sandy or Sydney. Ultimately, Taj, J.T., and Stephen did not want to risk Joe and Spencer feeling betrayed by voting Sydney off, so the vote went against Sandy and she was voted out.
263	5	"You're Going to Want that Tooth"	7.3/12	4.1/12	March 12, 2009	12.82	#15
The day after Tribal Council at Jalapao, Taj and Stephen found the Hidden Immunity Idol in the statue next to tree mail. Taj gave the idol to Stephen as he had shorts with pockets and was able to conceal the idol. While the rest of Timbira was off fetching water from the river, Sierra told Brendan that she decided to join the Exile Island alliance.: Reward Challenge: A tribe member would sit on a spinning platform at one end of the playing field. Another tribe member would start at the other end and race across to the platform, grab a rope and pull it back to the starting line. The rope would be wound around the base of the platform, causing the platform to spin as the rope is unwound. When the "puller" returned to the finish line, the sitting tribe member, now dizzy, would have to race across a balance beam to the finish line. The tribes would race against each other in rounds with the first dizzy tribe member across the finish line scoring one point for their tribe. The first tribe to score three points would win a trip to a cafe with coffee, fresh water, pastries, cookies, muffins, and a toilet with toilet paper.; Jalapao won the Reward Challenge by a score of 3–1 and chose Brendan to go to Exile Island; Brendan chose Stephen to join him. Midway through enjoying their reward, J.T. found envelopes with letters from home. Back at Timbira, Tyson told Coach and Debbie that he was suspicious that Brendan was building relationships with members of Jalapao and that they should vote out Brendan at the next Tribal Council. On Exile Island, Brendan talked to Stephen about cementing the secret four-way Exile Island alliance, but Stephen was privately unsure about tying his fate in the game to the alliance. Spencer decided to keep his homosexuality a secret from his tribe, thinking that there was nothing to gain by coming out and also that it might conflict with J.T.'s Southern values.: Immunity Challenge: Two tribemates from each tribe would alternate launching balls from a slingshot while the remaining four tribemates have to catch the balls with handheld nets. Catching a ball would score one point for their tribe. The first tribe to reach five points would win.; Despite J.T. losing half of a tooth and almost single-handedly winning the Immunity Challenge for his tribe by catching four balls, Tyson and Brendan helped score a victory for Timbira. Tempers flared at Jalapao over their performance at the Immunity Challenge, with J.T. upset at Spencer's poor defense and Taj venting at Joe. Joe wanted to vote off Taj for this reason but Jalapao eliminated Spencer instead, voting him out.
264	6	"The First Fifteen Days"	5.0/8	2.3/6	March 25, 2009	8.15	TBA
A recap of the first fifteen days including previously un-aired bonus footage.
265	7	"One of Those 'Coach Moments'"	6.5/11	3.6/11	April 2, 2009	11.27	#17
The day after Tribal Council, Sydney was worried that if Jalapao were to lose the next Immunity Challenge that either she or Taj would be voted off as the men would stick together. Joe tried to assure her that she would make it to the merge as she was trustworthy and the men would vote off Taj first. Taj and Stephen discussed telling J.T. about the Hidden Immunity Idol, but not the secret four-way Exile Island alliance in order to secure his vote at the next Tribal Council. Over at Timbira, Coach clashed with his tribe over him burning a pot of beans.: Reward Challenge: The tribes would have five minutes to build a barricade of poles tied together with ropes inside two frames of the opposing tribe. The tribes would then have to toss small ceramic pigs from tribemate to tribemate through the two frames, avoiding breaking them against the barricade or dropping them. The tribe which tosses the most intact pigs through the frames after ten minutes would win a trip to a waterfall and a barbecue with hamburgers.; The Reward Challenge was closely fought with Timbira winning with a score of 14–13. Timbira decided to send Joe to Exile Island and he chose Erinn to join him, thinking that she would be a good candidate to flip her tribal loyalties once the merge occurred. On Exile Island, Erinn selected the urn with the clue to the Hidden Immunity Idol and shared the clue with Joe. Joe and Erinn thought that if they could find the two Hidden Immunity Idols, they could have a strong alliance together. To counter Joe figuring out Jalapao's Hidden Immunity Idol had already been found, Taj and Stephen crafted a fake idol and placed it in the statue at tree mail. After using the real idol as a model for the fake one she made, Taj tried to hide it her bag, but J.T. stumbled upon the idol after she walked off. Stephen tried to cover for Taj by telling J.T. that Taj had just discovered the idol moments earlier and had shown it to him. A bit later, Taj showed the idol to J.T. and told him that he could have it anytime he needed it. J.T. believed Taj and Stephen to be honest in their story and that he now had a strong alliance with them.: Immunity Challenge: Each tribe would use a slingshot to shoot a tile out in three towers full of sand. After a tile is broken, the sand would be released from the tower which would cause a bag of puzzle pieces to be released and a tile at the next tower would be uncovered. The same tribe member could do all of the shooting with the slingshot or different shooters may be substituted. Once all three bags of puzzle pieces were collected, two tribe members would have to assemble the puzzle. The first tribe to assemble the puzzle correctly wins immunity.; At the Immunity Challenge, Tyson gave his tribe a large lead by winning the slingshot shoot out over J.T. Brendan and Erinn finished off the puzzle to give Timbira their third Immunity Challenge win in a row. After the challenge, Joe told his tribemates that Erinn kept the clue to the Hidden Immunity Idol to herself. Using an excuse that he wanted some water, he went to find the idol, not knowing that what he found was a fake. Joe told the tribe to vote out Taj. Stephen and J.T. tried to convince Joe to vote out Sydney but were unable to convince him to change his vote. Stephen and J.T. thought about the possibility of blindsiding Taj at Tribal Council since Stephen had the Hidden Immunity Idol. However, the two kept to their alliance with Taj and Sydney was voted out.
266	8	"The Dragon Slayer"	6.6/12	3.5/11	April 9, 2009	11.24	#16
Anticipating a merge, Coach refocused his game and tried to get along with his tribe. Over at Jalapao, an infection on Joe's left leg appeared to have gotten worse. The tree mail on day 19 hinted at a Reward Challenge with a feast for the winner, but the tribes instead arrived at the challenge site to see a hut with a feast and note saying that they had merged. The castaways named their new tribe Forza, a transliteration of força (Portuguese: "strength"), and moved to the old Timbira campsite. Coach approached J.T. about forming an alliance, which suited J.T. as he was concerned about Jalapao going into the merge down 4 to 6. After cementing the alliance with J.T., Coach approached Tyson about forming a four-way alliance with J.T. and Stephen, targeting Brendan as the next to be voted out because Coach and Tyson did not trust him. Tyson talked to Stephen and Debbie about the potential alliance. Taj was concerned that Brendan wasn't holding up to his end of the secret Exile Island alliance, but Brendan wanted to keep it a secret and lie low until there were only seven or eight castaways left. Joe and Erinn went to get the Timbira Hidden Immunity Idol, but found nothing and figured out that either Brendan or Sierra had it.: Immunity Challenge: The castaways would hang onto the top of a pole as long as they can. The last person left hanging without touching the ground would win. This was a rendition of a challenge used in Survivor: Vanuatu and Survivor: Cook Islands and was later used in Survivor: Heroes vs. Villains.; At the Immunity Challenge, Tyson outlasted Debbie to win the first Individual Immunity. After the challenge, Jeff told Joe to stay around so that the Survivor Medical Team could look at his infected leg. The doctor diagnosed that infection was serious and could spread to Joe's bones or blood, which could lead to amputation of his leg or loss of his life. Stephen, Tyson, and Coach decided to blindside Brendan and negate him potentially playing his Hidden Immunity Idol by splitting the Tribal Council vote with four votes against Brendan and three votes against Sierra. However, all of the plotting would have to wait potentially three more days when Jeff arrived at camp to announce that Joe had been medically evacuated from the game by the decision of the Survivor Medical Team and there would be no Tribal Council.
267	9	"The Biggest Fraud in the Game"	6.8/12	3.5/11	April 16, 2009	11.64	#15
Coach continued to feel that he was in control of the game and he targeted Brendan for elimination next, followed by Sierra. With Joe's departure, Erinn lost her only alliance member and thought about aligning herself with the former Jalapao members.: Reward Challenge: The castaways would be divided into teams of three: black, red, and white. The teams would have a row of eight team-colored ceramic tiles on frames belonging to them. Playing in rounds, one member from each team would throw a metal ball at the other two team's tiles to try to break them. When all eight tiles of a team were broken, the team would be out of the challenge. The last team with an intact tile would win a whitewater rafting trip down the Rio Novo and a picnic of sandwiches, chicken wings, brownies, watermelon, and potato chips.; The Reward Challenge was a nail-biter when the challenge came down to two partially broken tiles for the black team of Brendan, Debbie, and J.T versus the white team of Erinn, Sierra, and Stephen. A final toss by Brendan knocked out the final white tile and his team won the challenge. They selected Stephen to go alone to Exile Island, per the rules post tribal merger. Unlike most rewards in past seasons, the winning team went on their trip the next day instead of immediately after the completion of the challenge. On their picnic, Brendan talked to J.T. about going all the way to the finals together. The next day, Brendan talked to Sierra and Taj about a plan to keep J.T. in the game and to vote out Coach, Erinn, and Tyson.: Immunity Challenge: The castaways would be attached to a rope which is thread through three of obstacles, for which the castaways would have to climb under, over, or around. The first three castaways to finish would move on to the next round. The next round's challenge would be the same, but with a single obstacle three levels high. The first castaway to complete the obstacle would win. A rendition of this challenge would later appear in Survivor: Heroes vs. Villains.; The Immunity Challenge was won by Tyson for the second time in a row. Coach and Tyson conspired to split the Tribal Council vote four votes for Brendan and three votes for Sierra to protect against Brendan using his Hidden Immunity Idol. Brendan wanted to finally reveal the secret Exile Island alliance to blindside Coach. Stephen and J.T. thought about following the Exile Island alliance. At Tribal Council, Brendan revealed that he has a Hidden Immunity Idol, but opted not to play it, thinking he was safe. However, Stephen, J.T., and Taj aligned themselves with Coach and Tyson to blindside Brendan.
268	10	"It's Funny When People Cry"	6.8/12	3.2/11	April 23, 2009	11.30	#12
After returning to camp from Tribal Council, Sierra thought she was the next one to be voted out and she tried to smooth things over with Coach. The next morning, Sierra continued to plead for her life in the game, but Tyson ridiculed her and said that she would not be able to change the vote and she would be voted out next.: Reward Challenge: The castaways would be divided into two teams of four. Two members at a time from each team would race across a field to retrieve a large puzzle board. Once the pair returns, the other two teammates would retrieve another board. Four boards would need to be retrieved. Once retrieved, the boards would have to be arranged in a line so that the large holes were aligned like a grille to reveal seven vowels. The revealed vowels and seven consonants that would be given to the team would need to be arranged to solve a four-word phrase. The first team to solve the phrase (YOU'VE WON A FEAST) would win a trip to a local village for a feast of local food and a demonstration of Capoeira.; At the Reward Challenge, the red team of Debbie, Erinn, J.T., and Tyson prevailed over the black team of Coach, Sierra, Stephen, and Taj. Stephen was chosen to go to Exile Island for the second time in a row because the red team did not want to give Sierra the opportunity to find a supposed new Hidden Immunity Idol since Brendan took his with him when he was voted out. At Exile Island, Stephen found the seventh clue to the original Hidden Immunity Idol, meaning no replacement Idol was put into play. Sierra continued lobbying Coach to give her a second chance to remain in the game, but Coach refused her pleas. After describing the Immunity Challenge, Jeff offered anyone who felt comfortable enough in the game to sit out and eat pizza for the duration of the challenge; Coach, J.T., and Stephen chose to eat.: Immunity Challenge: The castaways would play a version of shuffleboard. Each castaway would be given three pucks which they would try to slide closest to the target marked with an X. The castaway whose puck ends up closest to the target would win. This challenge was originally from Survivor: The Amazon and Survivor: Vanuatu, and a rendition of this challenge would later appear in Survivor: Heroes vs. Villains.; Debbie won the challenge with the last slide of the game by knocking away Sierra's puck. Back at camp, Erinn pointed out to Stephen and Taj that there was an opportunity to vote out Tyson, the biggest perceived threat at the Immunity Challenges. Stephen agreed that this might be their only chance to take him out, so he convinced J.T. to blindside Tyson. J.T. was concerned about breaking up the "warrior" alliance he had with Coach and Tyson. At Tribal Council, Tyson and Sierra insulted one another, but it was Tyson who was voted out.
269	11	"They Both Went Bananas"	7.0/12	3.6/11	April 30, 2009	11.73	#17
Upon their return to camp after Tribal Council, Coach and Debbie were upset with J.T. and Stephen for not telling them about the blindside of Tyson. Debbie talked to Coach about reforming the Timbira alliance to regain control of the game.: Reward Challenge: Each of the castaways would fill out a questionnaire about the tribe in private, then the results would be tallied and the Challenge would begin. The questions would be posed to the group and the castaways would guess whose name was written most often. Each time a castaway guesses the correct answer, they would get one chop at a rope assigned to another castaway. After three chops, the rope would be released, which would smash an idol, removing that castaway from the challenge. The last castaway whose idol is not smashed would win a trip to a natural spring and a home cooked, traditional Brazilian feast made by a local family.; The Reward Challenge was won by Stephen, who selected fellow ex-Jalapaos Taj and J.T. to join him. Stephen selected Erinn to go to Exile Island because he felt that he had a strong alliance with J.T, Taj, and Erinn and that they needed one of their alliance members at Exile Island to find any Hidden Immunity Idol, but there was no new clue to a new Hidden Immunity Idol. While on their reward, J.T., Stephen, and Taj discussed strategy for the next Tribal Council, either voting out Debbie or Sierra. Coach and Debbie tried to strongarm Sierra into rejoining the former Timbira alliance, but when she hesitated, they angrily turned on her. Coach felt a line had been drawn in the sand and approached J.T. about what his plans were for the final four. Coach lied to J.T. that it was Sierra who brought up bringing back the old Timbira alliance. Meanwhile, Sierra told Stephen that it was Coach and Debbie who brought up the Timbira alliance. The differing stories made J.T. and Stephen suspicious of all three of them.: Immunity Challenge: The castaways would toss a grappling hook to retrieve three bags. The first three castaways to retrieve all of their bags would move on to the final round. In the final round, the three would compete in a labyrinth game. The first to finish would win.; At the Immunity Challenge, Coach, J.T., and Debbie moved on to the final round, which was won by Coach. In an effort to show that she was not lying about her version of the potential reforming of the former Timbira alliance, Sierra confronted Coach and Debbie about what exactly happened between the three of them in front of the whole tribe. Coach said that Debbie wanted to talk about a former Timbira alliance, Sierra got into Debbie's face, Debbie started to cry, and then he said that he did not want a Timbira alliance. Stephen and J.T. believed that Sierra's confrontation brought into the open Coach’s half-truths and Debbie's scheming and they considered voting Debbie out, but also thought that voting Sierra out would cause less drama in the future for the tribe. At Tribal Council, Coach and Sierra continued their confrontation about who said what regarding a Timbira alliance. Unable to sway her tribemates, Sierra was voted out.
270	12	"The Ultimate Sacrifice"	7.0/12	3.8/12	May 7, 2009	11.99	#15
Upon returning to camp after Tribal Council, Coach was livid about Erinn and Taj voting for Stephen and Debbie, respectively, at the last Tribal Council. He talked to Debbie about targeting Erinn and Taj next, with Taj to go first. On the morning of day 31, Debbie woke up feeling that she needed to move away from her alliance with Coach and told J.T. and Stephen that she wanted an alliance with them. However, Stephen was worried that she was just playing the game instead of wanting a real alliance.: Survivor Auction: Instead of a Reward Challenge, a Survivor Auction was held. Each castaway is given US$500. Castaways may not share any money or the item(s). The castaways must bid for the items in $20 increments. The auction will end without notice. Items bought include food and drinks and a video from home.; On the last item up for bid, Jeff presented a Samsung Instinct loaded with a video message from loved ones at home and announced that the usual Survivor Auction rules would be suspended and that the castaways could pool their money in order to get one of the castaways to win the item. Everybody gave their remaining money to Taj so that she could win the item uncontested. At the very end of the video message, Taj's husband, Eddie George, said that he would see them back at camp. After pointing out the last line in the video, Jeff told Taj that only Eddie would be back at camp, but if Taj offered to go to Exile Island where Eddie would join her, the other castaways' loved ones would be at the campsite. She immediately accepted the offer. Back at camp, the castaways were joined by Coach’s assistant, Debbie's husband, Erinn's father, J.T.'s younger sister, and Stephen's brother. After the loved ones had left, the game resumed on the morning of day 32 with Debbie continuing to push her allegiance to J.T. and Stephen, even so far as promising to give the final Individual Immunity to one of them should she win it and they make it to the final three. The three continued to be suspicious of her promises, and after J.T. and Stephen told Erinn of this offer, Erinn said that Debbie had to go next. Coach, still uninformed of the voting out of Debbie, pushed the idea of voting out Taj to prevent the Hidden Immunity Idol from being played.: Immunity Challenge: The castaways would have to go through an obstacle course of digging underneath a log, crossing a balance beam, and under a rope crawl. The castaways would then run across a field to where a spinning series of ten mathematical symbols would be displayed. The castaways would have to memorize the sequence of symbols, run back to starting line through the obstacles, and use the symbols in the correct order to solve a math equation. The first castaway to solve the math problem correctly would win immunity.; At the Immunity Challenge, Stephen was way behind the others as he stumbled off the balance beam several times, so he tried to remember all ten symbols in one pass, while the others needed multiple trips to try to remember the symbols. Stephen's memory technique did not fail him and he was able to come from behind to win Individual Immunity for the first time. Before Tribal Council, the game controlling alliance of J.T. and Stephen were torn between using the opportunity to vote out Coach or Debbie. They decided to move against Debbie, and she was voted out.
271	13	"The Martyr Approach"	7.0/12	3.8/11	May 14, 2009	12.18	#18
Coach was shocked by the turn of events at the last Tribal Council, especially after he was told that Debbie voted for him. Coach told J.T. and Stephen that he did not want to go to Exile Island because of his asthma, but J.T. and Stephen believed that Coach was scared to go to Exile Island and looked forward to sending him there.: Reward Challenge: With their feet shackled together, the castaways would have to race through a maze in the shape of the letters of the word 'Survivor' and then build a long wooden pole by tying together short wooden sticks. The pole would be used to hook a sandbag which they castaways would swing to knock over three targets. When all three targets are knocked over, a flag would be raised. The first castaway to raise their flag would win an overnight trip to the Governor's Retreat where the castaway would have a bed to sleep in, take a shower, and eat at a traditional Brazilian churrasco.; The Reward Challenge was won by J.T. by a wide margin. He selected Stephen to go with him on the trip, and Coach to go to Exile Island. After he was selected to go to Exile Island, Coach said that he welcomed the opportunity to test himself and would take the "monastic approach" on Exile by spending the time meditating without food or water. This did not sit well with Erinn, who suspected that Coach was seeking an excuse for his inability to light a fire and prepare his meals. She called him out for trying to take the "martyr approach" and use his time at Exile Island as an excuse for not winning the next Immunity Challenge. While Stephen and J.T. enjoyed their reward, Erinn admitted to Taj that she felt a little guilty about what she said to Coach after the Reward Challenge, and was worried that what she said could cause J.T. and Stephen to vote her out before Coach. Taj reassured her that this was not the case, that their alliance was still strong. Coach did exactly what he said he would do on Exile Island, except for drinking some water, and was mentally refocused on the game. While on their reward, J.T. and Stephen talked about voting Erinn out before Coach because of what she said to Coach.: Immunity Challenge: The castaways would brace themselves with their arms between two walls while standing barefoot on two-foot pegs. Every 15 minutes, the castaways would move down to smaller foot pegs. When the castaways reached the third set of foot pegs, they would try to remain on them as long as they could. The last castaway to remain on their pegs would win. A rendition of this challenge later appeared in Survivor: Heroes vs. Villains.; The Immunity Challenge was won by J.T. when he outlasted Coach, who collapsed from the challenge due to back spasms. Coach declined to have the Survivor Medical Team look at him as he said he feared that he would be pulled from the game for medical reasons. Erinn and Taj were suspicious that Coach was playing up the sympathy card and that he did not want a medical exam because he knew that it would reveal that he was not hurt. J.T. and Stephen told Coach that their alliance was good and that Erinn was going to be voted out, but Stephen was not sure who he would vote for. At Tribal Council, the confrontation between Coach and Erinn at the Reward Challenge was again discussed. Just before the vote, Coach recited a poem, which visibly annoyed the jury members. Before reading the votes, Jeff stated that this is the last time the Hidden Immunity Idol could be played. Stephen cast the deciding vote against Coach and he was voted out.
272	14	"I Trust You But I Trust Me More"	7.0/11	4.2/	May 17, 2009	12.94	#14
Back at camp after Tribal Council, Stephen was concerned that he would be perceived as the one who betrayed Coach and that he lost jury votes.: Immunity Challenge: The castaways would have to race through a series of rope tunnels in the shape of a tarantula to three different stations to retrieve three bags of puzzle pieces, one at a time. The puzzle pieces would then be assembled into a web-shaped puzzle. The first castaway to finish their puzzle would win.; At the Immunity Challenge, J.T. got a large lead during the puzzle piece bag retrieval stage, Erinn made a huge comeback from behind during the puzzle assembly stage, but J.T. managed to finish his puzzle just in front of Erinn to win immunity. Erinn pleaded her case to J.T. and Stephen that Taj was a threat for winning jury votes. The men agreed that they would take each other to the Final Two no matter what but were undecided on if Erinn or Taj would be a greater threat at the next Immunity Challenge and with the jury. At Tribal Council, the men decided to break up the Jalapao alliance that existed since very early in the game with a vote against Taj and she was blindsided by a vote of 3–1. On day 38, Erinn and Stephen told each other that they had to win the Immunity Challenge as neither stood a very good chance against J.T. with the jury. J.T. gave his word to Stephen that he would take him to the Final Two and Stephen likewise gave his word. The day's tree mail told the Final Three to take the traditional journey honoring the castaways voted out before heading to their final Immunity Challenge.: Immunity Challenge: The castaways would drop a ball into a metal chute. The ball would travel down a spiraling metal track and exit out of one of two points. The castaway would have to catch the ball and drop the ball back into the chute at the top. Every few minutes, an additional ball would be added to the track until eight balls were simultaneously going around the track. A turnstile gate in the middle of the track would rotate, causing the balls to alternate exiting out of the two exits. If a ball exits the track and is not caught, the castaway would be eliminated from the challenge. The last castaway remaining would win. To make the challenge more difficult, each castaway would have one hand tied behind their backs.; At the Immunity Challenge, Erinn was out first with three balls simultaneously going. With four balls circling the track, Stephen bobbled and dropped a ball, giving J.T. his third Immunity Challenge win in a row. Back at camp, even though Stephen lost the challenge, he felt a great relief that he would not have to decide who he had to take to the Final Two. Erinn told J.T. that Stephen told her that he would take her to the Final Two over J.T. to ensure himself a victory with the jury. When J.T. asked him, Stephen denied that he would have taken Erinn to the Final Two. At the final Tribal Council, J.T. decided to stick with his alliance and promise to Stephen, voted against Erinn, and she became the final member of the jury. J.T. and Stephen enjoyed the traditional Final Two breakfast that they had planned to attend since the very beginning of the game. At the final Tribal Council, Brendan focused on Stephen's opening statement that he had grown personally in the game, asking Stephen and J.T. if personal growth was relevant and important to winning the game. Erinn asked Stephen about his changing alliances between the Jalapao Three, the Exile Island alliance, and the Warrior alliance. She asked J.T. why Stephen was the best player in the game. Debbie questioned J.T. about if her first impression of him of being an honest person was correct or if lying and deception was his M.O. She asked Stephen that if he had been the one wearing the Individual Immunity necklace at the last Tribal Council, would he have taken Erinn or J.T. to the Final Two. Coach asked J.T. and Stephen for examples of honesty and integrity during later stages of the game and being the noble warrior. Sierra had no question to ask of Stephen. She asked J.T. what he meant by taking the strongest players to the end as she called Stephen one of the weakest players in the game. Tyson asked J.T. if and why Stephen was an asset to him in getting to the Final Two. Tyson asked for a response from Stephen about J.T.'s answer to Tyson's question. Taj asked J.T. why, if it was so hard for him to write down Coach’s name at Tribal Council, it seemed so effortless for him to write down her name and why he thought it would be easy to lie to her. She asked Stephen why he felt it was so important to blindside her and if he felt that she was that big of a threat in the game.
273	15	"Reunion"	6.4/11	4.1/	May 17, 2009	11.59	#20
Months later, the castaways return to discuss the season with host Jeff Probst. The votes were read, and J.T. earned all seven jury votes, winning the title of Sole Survivor.

== Voting history ==
	Original tribes						Merged tribe							
Episode	1	2	3	4	5	7	8	9	10	11	12	13	14	
Day	3	6	9	12	15	18	20	24	27	30	33	36	37	38
Tribe	Jalapao	Timbira	Timbira	Jalapao	Jalapao	Jalapao	Forza	Forza	Forza	Forza	Forza	Forza	Forza	Forza
Eliminated	Carolina	Candace	Jerry	Sandy	Spencer	Sydney	Joe	Brendan	Tyson	Sierra	Debbie	Coach	Taj	Erinn
Votes	7–1	7–1	6–1	5–1–1	5–1	3–2	Evacuated (Note: No vote; Joe was medically evacuated from the game.)	4–3–2	5–3	4–2–1	4–1–1	3–2	3–1	1–0
Voter	Vote													
J.T.	Carolina			Sandy	Spencer	Sydney		Sierra	Tyson	Sierra	Debbie	Erinn	Taj	Erinn
Stephen	Carolina			Sandy	Spencer	Sydney		Brendan	Tyson	Sierra	Debbie	Coach	Taj	None (Note: Erinn and Stephen were not eligible to vote as the only eligible players they could vote for were each other.)
Erinn		Candace	Jerry					Sierra	Tyson	Stephen	Debbie	Coach	Taj	None
Taj	Carolina			Joe	Spencer	Sydney		Brendan	Tyson	Debbie	Debbie	Coach	Erinn	
Coach		Candace	Jerry					Brendan	Sierra	Sierra	Taj	Erinn		
Debbie		Candace	Jerry					Brendan	Sierra	Sierra	Coach			
Sierra		Candace	Jerry					Coach	Tyson	Debbie				
Tyson		Candace	Jerry					Sierra	Sierra					
Brendan		Candace	Jerry					Coach						
Joe	Carolina			Sandy	Spencer	Taj	Evacuated							
Sydney	Carolina			Sandy	Spencer	Taj								
Spencer	Carolina			Sandy	Taj									
Sandy	Carolina			Sydney										
Jerry		Candace	Erinn											
Candace		Sierra												
Carolina	Sandy													

Jury vote
Episode	15	
Day	39	
Finalist	J.T.	Stephen
Votes	7–0	
Juror	Vote	
Erinn	Yes	
Taj	Yes	
Coach	Yes	
Debbie	Yes	
Sierra	Yes	
Tyson	Yes	
Brendan	Yes	

== Reception ==
Survivor: Tocantins – The Brazilian Highlands received very positive reviews from critics and fans alike. Fans and critics praised the "back-to-basics" structure of the season as well as the highly entertaining cast. Particular praise was handed to the personalities of finalists James "J.T." Thomas and Stephen Fishbach, who formed a tight alliance early in the game and managed to make it to the end while remaining on great terms with the rest of the contestants. Contestants Benjamin "Coach" Wade and Tyson Apostol were met with polarized receptions due to their villainous behavior. Thomas, Fishbach, Wade, and Apostol would go on to compete in future seasons of the show and are seen as some of the most popular and influential players in Survivor history. In 2015, a poll by Rob Has a Podcast ranked this season 11th out of 30 with Rob Cesternino ranking this season 12th. This was updated in 2021 during Cesternino's podcast, Survivor All-Time Top 40 Rankings, ranking 10th out of 40. Dalton Ross of Entertainment Weekly ranked this season 22nd out of 40 saying the season was bolstered by "Coach" and that "other than Tyson getting blindsided, were there any memorable moments that didn't involve the Dragonslayer?" The "Purple Rock Podcast" named the season the eleventh greatest in Survivor history, claiming, "The strategy is slightly lacking and there aren’t many gimmicks or twists, but the season makes up for it with comedy and a group of players so likable you probably won’t care much who wins the season." Similarly, Inside Survivor also ranked the season as the eleventh best. In their review, they highlighted that, "It has some modern-day twists (with idols and Exile), a couple of epic blindsides, and a shift into 'big-character' edits." In 2024, Nick Caruso of TVLine ranked this season 29th out of 47.
