= Tyson Apostol =

American reality television personality (born 1979)

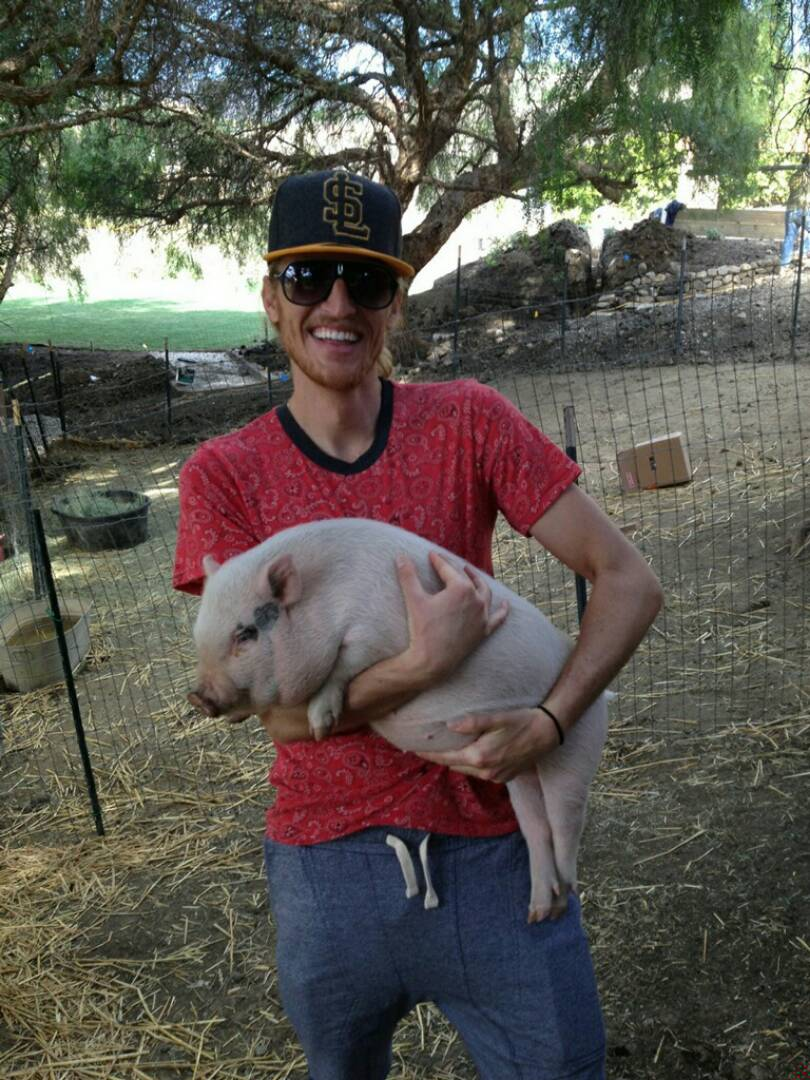
- Apostol in 2014
- Born: June 17, 1979 (age 47); Provo, Utah, U.S.
- Occupations: Reality show contestant, professional cyclist, podcaster
- Television: Survivor: Tocantins; Survivor: Heroes vs. Villains; Survivor: Blood vs. Water (winner); Survivor: Winners at War
- Spouse: Rachel Foulger (m. 2015)
- Children: 2
- Website: tysonapostol.com

Tyson Apostol (born June 17, 1979) is an American reality television personality, best known for his appearances on four seasons of the CBS reality television show Survivor.

Apostol originally competed on Survivor: Tocantins in 2009, finishing in 8th place. He returned as a villain on Survivor: Heroes vs. Villains in 2010 and came in 15th place. In 2013, he returned to compete and was crowned the winner of Survivor: Blood vs. Water. Apostol competed for a fourth time on the show's 40th season Survivor: Winners at War, finishing in 11th place.

Apostol is a former professional cyclist. In addition to Survivor, he has also appeared on Marriage Boot Camp, The Challenge: USA, and House of Villains. He co-hosts several podcasts, including News AF on Rob Has a Podcast, The Pod Has Spoken on The Ringer and the official House of Villains podcast.

== Personal life ==
Apostol was born in Provo, Utah, on June 17, 1979, and raised in Lindon, Utah. He graduated from Orem High School. He spent two years in the Philippines as a missionary for the Church of Jesus Christ of Latter-day Saints. He attended Brigham Young University on a swimming scholarship, but did not graduate. Apostol cycled professionally in Europe, including for Team Volksbank between 2005 and 2007. Once back in the United States, he managed a Utah bicycle shop.

Apostol proposed to his girlfriend of six years, Rachel Foulger, during the finale of Marriage Boot Camp: Reality Stars 2. The episode aired on March 13, 2015. Apostol and Foulger confirmed several days later that they had gotten married in the time since filming the show. Apostol's Survivor: Tocantins co-star, Stephen Fishbach, officiated the private ceremony on February 8, 2015, in Utah.

Foulger and Apostol have two daughters. They currently live in the Phoenix, Arizona area.

Apostol is an avid pickleball player and social media influencer for pickleball brands. He was featured in Vanity Fair for his influence in the sport.

== Professional cycling ==
From 2005 to 2007, Apostol competed as a professional cyclist for Team Volksbank Leingruber Ideal and Team Vorarlberg, both based in Austria.

== Survivor ==
=== Tocantins ===
On the 18th season of Survivor, Apostol was placed in the Timbira tribe, initially sticking with the majority alliance and forming a particularly close bond with Benjamin "Coach" Wade, who dubbed Apostol his "assistant coach." Early on, Apostol wanted to blindside fellow contestant Erinn Lobdell; however, he eventually sided with the majority and voted out the ill Jerry Sims. At the merge, Apostol won the first individual immunity by outlasting former tribemate Debbie Beebe. He went on to win immunity again with nine contestants left as well. Wade and Apostol aligned with Stephen Fishbach, James "J.T." Thomas, Jr., and Beebe, blindsiding Brendan Synnott with the cooperation of Lobdell and Tamara "Taj" Johnson-George. Sierra Reed became the target, but Thomas, Lobdell, and Fishbach joined the other group, deciding that Apostol was a bigger threat than Reed; Apostol was voted out and became the second juror. He eventually voted for Thomas to win the game.

Jeff Probst stated that Apostol was one of his favorites of the season because he was maniacal and unpredictable.

=== Heroes vs. Villains ===
Apostol accepted an offer to participate again, in the show's 20th season, where he was assigned to the Villains tribe. His tribe dominated the initial immunity challenges. He formed an alliance with Jerri Manthey and fellow Tocantins participant Benjamin "Coach" Wade. Apostol appeared to be safe after joining the alliance of "Boston Rob" Mariano, Sandra Diaz-Twine, and Courtney Yates, along with Wade and Manthey. This group held a majority over the bloc of Russell Hantz, Parvati Shallow, and Danielle DiLorenzo. When both the Heroes and Villains tribes had to vote someone out consecutively, Mariano directed his alliance to split their votes due to Hantz's possession of a hidden immunity idol. The plan was to have him, Mariano and Diaz-Twine vote to eliminate Hantz and Yates, Manthey and Wade vote to eliminate Shallow. If Hantz gave Shallow the idol or if Hantz did not play the idol at all, on the revote, Hantz would be eliminated. If Hantz played the idol for himself, on the revote, Shallow would be eliminated 4-3-0. Hantz manipulated Apostol into disobeying Mariano's plan, and instead of forcing a tie, Apostol switched his vote to Shallow. After Hantz gave Shallow the hidden immunity idol and she played it, Apostol was the sixth contestant eliminated by a vote of 3–2, with Hantz's idol negating four votes against Shallow.

If Apostol voted along Mariano's plan, he and Hantz would have tied 3–3, and Hantz would have been eliminated on the revote. Thus, Apostol was the sixth survivor and the second Villain to be voted out of the season. His switching votes has been called "one of the dumbest moves in Survivor history." His vote switch caused huge ramifications on the game as Hantz and Shallow both would make it to the Final Tribal Council despite both losing to the more heroic, Diaz-Twine.

=== Blood vs. Water ===
Apostol returned for Survivor's 27th season, Blood vs. Water. This time, he and his longtime girlfriend, Rachel Foulger, were both cast as contestants. He was assigned to the Galang tribe, while she went to Tadhana. Foulger was the third person eliminated from the game after being the second contestant to be voted out in a Tribal Council.

Later on, a tribe switch put Apostol on a tribe with fellow former Galang members Gervase Peterson and Aras Baskauskas, as well as former Tadhana members Hayden Moss, Ciera Eastin, and Caleb Bankston. Using the clues to the hidden immunity idol's location, given to him verbally by Moss and Bankston, Apostol found the first idol by himself and kept it a secret. He also formed an alliance with Peterson, Moss, Eastin, and Bankston. At the merge, this alliance joined with Monica Culpepper and Eastin's mother, Laura Morett, to take out Baskauskas and his brother, Vytas, as well as Tina Wesson. From here, Apostol began looking further past this alliance of seven, orchestrating Morett's return to Redemption Island and voting out Bankston, who was conspiring to blindside him. In this Tribal Council, Apostol used his idol, even though no votes were cast against him and Bankston still received the majority of votes.

With the sudden revelation that he had had the idol all along, Apostol began facing rebellion within his alliance from Moss and Eastin, who continuously appealed to Culpepper to switch her vote and go with them to vote against Apostol and Peterson. However, Apostol maintained control of Peterson and Culpepper, and even found the idol a second time, utilizing the clue that Eastin was given. Apostol later won the final two immunity challenges, thus guaranteeing himself a spot in the final three.

He then decided to vote out former Survivor winner Wesson, who had just returned from Redemption Island, recognizing she was his only remaining threat for jury votes. Thus he went to the finals alongside the less-liked Peterson and Culpepper, who were both widely viewed by the jury as riding Apostol's coattails, letting him make all the decisions, and doing little to play their own games, with Culpepper especially being criticized for failing to make a big blindside move against Apostol and Peterson despite numerous opportunities to do so. Culpepper was also razzed for her lack of social bonds with any of the other players outside of her alliance, and she broke down crying during Final Tribal Council. Though Apostol was responsible for most of the jury members' eliminations, his method of playing the game was praised, and he was voted the $1 million winner, receiving seven of the eight jury votes (with Culpepper receiving the dissenting vote, from Vytas Baskauskas).

=== Winners at War ===
Apostol once again came back for the show's 40th season, Winners at War. He was a member of the Dakal tribe. He was targeted by Yul Kwon early in the game for having close ties with other players outside the game, such as Rob Mariano and Kim Spradlin-Wolfe. After Dakal lost the fifth immunity challenge, Apostol became the fifth person voted off and went to the Edge of Extinction. He rejoined the game at the merge after winning the return challenge against the other Edge of Extinction contestants. However, Apostol was voted off again on day 25 and returned to the Edge of Extinction. He was defeated in the second return challenge by Natalie Anderson, for whom he later voted to win the season, though she would lose to Tyson's former Dakal tribemate Tony Vlachos, who won the season and became the second-ever two-time winner in Survivor history.

== Other screen appearances ==
External videos
- "The Star Wars That I Used to Know" by teddiefilms on YouTube

Apostol starred in the viral video, "The Star Wars That I Used to Know" (a parody Gotye's "Somebody That I Used to Know"), as 'Darth Gotye.'

Apostol appeared on the fourth season of Marriage Boot Camp in 2014. He appeared on the show with his then-fiancée, Rachel Foulger, who also appeared with him on Survivor: Blood vs. Water. He proposed to Foulger during the finale of the show.

Apostol appeared in the first season of The Challenge: USA in 2022. Despite a strong performance throughout the season, he lost in the Final after struggling with a Sudoku puzzle with no instructions.

Apostol competed in the third season of Peacock's reality television series House of Villains. He was eliminated by the jury in its ninth episode.

== Podcasting ==
In 2015, Apostol started hosting the Spyson Hour on Rob Has a Podcast along with Rob Cesternino and his Marriage Boot Camp co-star, Spencer Pratt. The podcast initially discussed each week's episode of Marriage Boot Camp, later evolving into a podcast that discussed strange current events and stories from the internet. After Pratt abruptly departed in 2015, Danny Bryson joined the podcast, with the podcast name changed to News AF. Bryson is a longtime personal friend of Apostol who had previously been featured on the Animal Planet show, 100 Miles from Nowhere. As of March 2026, News AF has published more than 700 episodes.

Apostol has worked for The Ringer since 2021, hosting The Pod Has Spoken podcast, where he breaks down Survivor episodes with Riley McAtee.

From 2021 to 2022, Apostol co-hosted a pickleball podcast, PicklePod, with Thomas Shields. From 2022 to 2023, Apostol co-hosted the official podcast of Major League Pickleball, Inside MLP Podcast, with Casey Patterson and Michelle McMahon. In 2023, Apostol co-hosted a short-form pickleball podcast, Pickleball Minutes with Tyson and Patrick.

From 2022 to 2023, Apostol co-hosted a podcast with Rob Mariano, Life with Boston Rob and Tyson Apostol. The podcast discussed the lives of the two friends and former Survivor winners. From 2024 to 2025, he co-hosted Midlife Crisisses, a self-improvement podcast, with Bradley Hasemeyer and William Drumm.

In 2026, Apostol began hosting the official House of Villains companion podcast to discuss and analyze each episode of the season he appeared on.

== Poker ==
In 2018, Apostol appeared on the first season of the CBS Sports Network show Poker Night Live (Survivor Champion Night) where he played a no-limit hold'em cash game with fellow Survivor cast members Rob Mariano, Kim Spradlin, and Jeremy Collins. Apostol had previously appeared on another episode of Poker Night Live (Reality Stars Night) along with Joe Stapleton, Tiffany Michelle, and Jesse Abramowitz.

As of 2026, he has $44,562 in live poker tournament winnings across ten lifetime events.

== Filmography ==
=== Television ===
Year	Title	Role	Notes
2009	Survivor: Tocantins — The Brazilian Highlands	Contestant	Eliminated; 8th place
2010	Survivor: Heroes vs. Villains	Contestant	Eliminated; 15th place
2013	Survivor: Blood vs. Water	Contestant	Winner
2015	Marriage Boot Camp: Reality Stars 2	Himself	
2018	Poker Night Live	Himself	2 episodes
2020	Survivor: Winners at War	Contestant	Eliminated; 11th place
2022	The Challenge: USA	Contestant	Runner-up
2026	House of Villains	Contestant	Eliminated; 6th place

=== Music video ===
Year	Title	Role
2012	"The Star Wars That I Used to Know"	Darth Gotye

Preceded by John Cochran	Winner of Survivor; Survivor: Blood vs. Water	Succeeded by Tony Vlachos
