= Rob and Amber =

Rob and Amber, also Romber, refers to:

- Amber Mariano (née Brkich, born 1978), American reality show contestant
- Rob Mariano, (born 1975), American reality show contestant
