= Rudy Boesch =

United States Navy SEAL and reality television competitor (1928–2019)

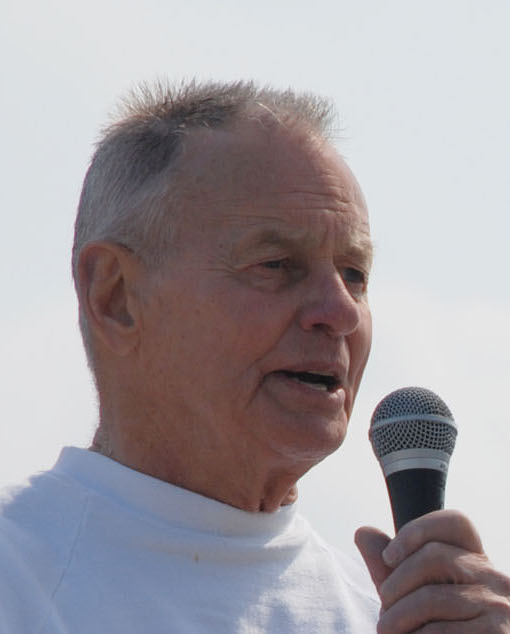
- Boesch delivers opening remarks for the third annual Rudy Run SEAL Challenge at Naval Amphibious Base Little Creek in 2007
- Born: Rudolph Ernst Boesch; January 20, 1928; Rochester, New York, U.S.
- Died: November 1, 2019 (aged 91); Virginia Beach, Virginia, U.S.
- Military career
- Allegiance: United States
- Branch: United States Navy
- Service years: 1945–1990
- Rank: Master chief petty officer
- Unit: U.S. Navy SEALs
- Conflicts: Vietnam War
- Awards: Bronze Star; Defense Superior Service Medal
- Other work: Survivor: Borneo; Survivor: All-Stars

Rudolph Ernst Boesch (/bɒʃ/ BOSH; January 20, 1928 – November 1, 2019) was a United States Navy SEAL, and two-time competitor on the reality competition show Survivor.

Born and raised in Rochester, New York, Boesch enlisted in the United States Navy at age 17. He became an Underwater Demolition Team (UDT) Frogman in 1951, serving on two UDT Teams. He was chosen as one of the first SEALs, becoming chief of the boat of newly created SEAL Team TWO in 1962. Starting in 1968 and 1970, Boesch completed two combat deployments during the Vietnam War, where he earned the Bronze Star for heroic action. During that time and later, Boesch set physical and operational standards at SEAL Team TWO. In 1987, he became Senior Enlisted Advisor for United States Special Operations Command. Designated the "Bullfrog", the longest-serving SEAL still on active duty, Boesch achieved considerable renown within the force for his physical fitness training regimens and his military appearance. After 45 years of continuous service, he retired from the Navy in 1990 as a master chief petty officer.

The oldest competitor on the inaugural Survivor: Borneo at 72 years of age, Boesch finished in third place. The program was the top-rated show on American television during summer 2000, and with his gruff, cantankerous manner, and his politically incorrect "Rudyisms", he became one of the show's most popular contestants. Boesch set the age record again when he competed on Survivor: All-Stars at 75. He parlayed his fame into several other television appearances, including hosting the show Combat Missions in 2002. He died from Alzheimer's disease in 2019.

== Early life ==
Boesch was born in Rochester, New York on January 20, 1928, the son of Austrian immigrants Clara (a housewife) and August (a butcher). Boesch credited his parents' Central European upbringing for instilling him with discipline and work ethic. He attended a Catholic primary school in Rochester; he later recalled that the nuns teaching there "beat intelligence into you. We did a little bit of everything – arithmetic, geography, honesty. Those were the things we learned." Boesch's father fought for the German Army during World War I, inspiring him to seek military service as well.

== Military career ==
Too young to join the Marines, Boesch dropped out of high school and enlisted in the United States Navy in April 1945 at age 17. Following boot camp at Naval Training Station Sampson in New York, he volunteered for the Amphibious Scouts and Raiders at Fort Pierce, Florida, where he was tentatively assigned to conduct covert reconnaissance of China's coastline.

The Second World War ended before the training completed, but he was still sent to China. For a while he and a few others guarded a decommissioned ship in Victoria Harbour, Hong Kong. He then had a tour as a boatswain's mate (BM) on board USS Massey, a destroyer ported on the Chinese coast. That was followed by a period of shore duty in London. He volunteered for UDT Frogman training in late 1950, graduating in Underwater Demolition Team Replacement Class #6 in 1951.

Boesch met his future wife, Marge, at a wedding circa 1950–1951. They married in 1955 and had three daughters in the following years. Meanwhile, he served in UDT Team 2 and later UDT Team 21 alongside Richard Marcinko.

In 1962, Roy Boehm selected Boesch, a Chief Boatswain's Mate (BMC), to be chief of the boat of newly created SEAL Team Two. One of the first opportunities for the team came later that year during the Cuban Missile Crisis, when they were put on alert for possible action. Orr Kelly's 1995 Never Fight Fair: Navy SEALs' Stories of Combat and Adventure contains a description by Marcinko, also a member of the team, of a near-suicidal mission that never took place – to parachute into Havana Harbor and attack strategic targets – and of Boesch fielding direct calls from President John F. Kennedy inquiring as to their readiness. In 1967, Boesch was promoted to the rank of master chief petty officer.

In 1968, Boesch was sent on a combat deployment to the Vietnam War, as a platoon chief based in Mỹ Tho in the Mekong Delta. The general combat mission of SEALs in Vietnam was to do intelligence gathering and to conduct raids and ambushes and make prisoner grabs. In Boesch's own 1995 retelling, he did all those things on that tour. In the 2010 Vietnam-era memoir SEAL Warrior: The Only Easy Day Was Yesterday, Thomas Keith describes Boesch leading a platoon in nighttime ambush raids against the Viet Cong during the war, operating in the delta and using LCM-8 "Mike boats" for access. Boesch earned the Bronze Star for heroic action during more than 45 combat operations. Another primary mission for SEALs during the conflict was to train South Vietnamese special forces. When Boesch deployed to Vietnam again, in 1970, as he later related, he was sent to Cam Ranh Bay, where he conducted training for the Liên Đoàn Người Nhái, the South Vietnamese equivalent of the UDT, as part of the so-called "Vietnamization" strategy. Boesch later concluded that these allied forces were capable, but overly dependent upon the U.S., and that "Vietnamization was an idea that came too late to do enough good."

Between the Vietnam deployments, Boesch trained and competed for the U.S. Navy's bobsled team. One was the Kennedy Memorial Winter Games in Lake Placid, New York, in early 1970. Boesch also competed with the Hurricane Bobsled Club of the Adirondacks in competitions at Lake Placid.

During and after his stint in Vietnam, Boesch set physical and operational standards at SEAL Team Two. With the creation of Special Operations Command (SOCOM) in 1987, its first Commander-in-chief General James J. Lindsay selected BMCM Boesch to serve as SOCOM's first Senior Enlisted Advisor. Before his retirement, Boesch was designated the "Chief SEAL" (a.k.a. "Bull Frog"), a title identifying the longest-serving SEAL still on active duty. (Note: Of the Navy SEALs (known as Frogmen) on active duty, the Bull Frog is the one with the greatest amount of service since completing BUD/S training.) Upon his retirement from the Navy on August 1, 1990, as a command master chief petty officer, he was awarded the Defense Superior Service Medal.

Boesch's time and character as a SEAL has been described in a number of books and other publications. Editor Bill Fawcett included his story as the opening, 30-page recollection in his 1995 Hunters & Shooters: An Oral History of the U.S. Navy SEALs in Vietnam. Orr Kelly's aforementioned 1995 volume included descriptions by Rudy (and Marge as well) of their parachuting experiences, along with a few of Rudy's recollections of Vietnam. In his 1998 memoir, Good to Go: The Life and Times of a Decorated Member of the U.S. Navy's Elite SEAL Team Two, former SEAL Harry Constance describes Boesch as giving a no-nonsense introduction to SEALs in training and then later giving him informal advice not to take a posting that would involve troublesome superiors. A 1999 documentary on the SEALs on the History channel featured Boesch (it was released later that year as the DVD The Complete History of the U.S. Navy SEALs). In an early 2000s interview, a SEAL said that Boesch was "a walking Bible on Special Operations." In his aforementioned 2010 memoir, Thomas Keith portrayed Boesch as a master of the military art of gathering resources: "From weapons to the men who would use them, Rudy could scrounge like nobody else in the SEAL Teams. He wasn't going to let anything or anybody get in the way of putting together the best platoon he could build, beg, borrow, coerce, or dig out of the Operations Department."

Boesch was a physical training fanatic whose dog tag listed "PT" as his religion and who through the decades gained a reputation for leading grueling runs that men would look for ways to avoid by faking injuries or hiding in bushes. In former SEAL James Watson's 1995 memoir Point Man, he states of 1964 training that, "We had to be physically fit to perform what was expected of us. And for all our trying [to get out of the runs], Rudy Boesch made sure that we stayed in condition." Kevin Dockery's 2003 work Navy Seals: A History Part III – Post-Vietnam to the Present includes three different SEALs relating how, when Boesch was 50 to 57 years old, he could keep up with or surpass trainees less than half his age in five-mile runs, obstacle courses, and open sea swimming. In his 2011 memoir, SEAL Team Six: Memoirs of an Elite Navy SEAL Sniper, former SEAL Howard E. Wasdin tells of being assigned to SEAL Team TWO in the late 1980s, where Boesch, though nearly 60 years old, nevertheless ran with the trainees over an obstacle course; he then made every person who finished behind him run it again. Even Boesch's physical appearance made a mark: Wasdin refers to him as an exemplar of military form; another account talks of his haircut and uniform being perfect at 5 or 6 o'clock in the morning; and, in 2002's One Perfect Op, former SEAL Dennis Chalker said that, among SEALs based on the U.S. East Coast in the late 1970s, the style was known as a "Rudy Boesch haircut", an even more severe version of the normal military crew cut.

Overall, in his history of SEAL operations in Vietnam, former SEAL T.L. Bosiljevac writes that Boesch symbolizes much of what the SEAL teams represent and that, "There are a lot of colorful personalities among the teams, but even considering the best of those, Rudy Boesch is a legend. Everybody knows Rudy, and you can bet that Rudy knows everyone in return ... [including] some of the Navy's top brass." Several of these other accounts have also referred to Boesch as a legend within the SEALs.

== Survivor ==
=== Borneo ===
In 2000, Boesch appeared in Survivor: Borneo, the name later assigned to the inaugural season of the U.S. version of Survivor, filmed on the remote Malaysian island of Pulau Tiga. Initially placed with Tagi tribe, he befriended the former West Point student Richard Hatch. Despite his discomfort with Hatch's homosexuality and penchant for nudity, Boesch aligned with Hatch and admonished his tribemates to "shut up and let [Hatch] lead." Despite his earlier life of athleticism, Boesch struggled against the ageism of the younger castaways and needed Richard's alliance for his own safety.

Boesch found his niche in camp life cooking for his tribe, using the resourcefulness learned from his tours in Vietnam. His preparation area was dubbed "Rowdy Rudy's Diner". While his tribemates relied on boiling water to avoid pathogens, he drank unpurified water, advising, "If I'm not still standing at noon, don't drink it", and explaining that his lack of fear was based on his having drunk much fouler water in Vietnam. At the final challenge for tribal immunity, he single-handedly sprinted with a heavy wooden chest across the beach to seal his tribe's victory. He also won an individual immunity challenge by defeating the other competitors on a human-sized checkerboard.

Going into the final immunity challenge, Rudy was the most popular player remaining in the game. Thus, he was the favorite to win the million-dollar prize provided he made it to the final Tribal Council. Host Jeff Probst and the show's production staff thought Rudy was likely to win the final challenge and the game. In the final challenge, competitors had to stand in the hot sun for hours while touching an idol. Richard made a strategic move to drop out of the challenge early, while Rudy fatigued himself by competing for four hours, before inadvertently dropping his hand from the idol, which led to his elimination. This left 23-year-old Kelly Wiglesworth the challenge victor, and she voted Boesch out of the game as she believed she had a better chance of defeating Hatch than Boesch at the Final Tribal Council. Despite his resentment about Hatch's move, Boesch still voted for Hatch at the final tribal council, so Hatch became the first Survivor winner.

The 5-foot-10-inch (1.78 m) Boesch weakened physically during the castaway experience, losing 22 pounds (10.0 kg) off his SEALs-era weight of 185 pounds (84 kg) that he started the show with, but unlike some of the other contestants, he did not get sick. He later said, "the real survival part [for me] was putting up with the young kids who were there. I don't speak their language."

The summer series had become the top-rated show on American television and the finale was watched by over 50 million people. As the show's episodes aired, Boesch became one of the cast's most popular contestants, and his appeal extended across all demographic groups. The "Rudy" persona was based around his gruff, cantankerous manner, his flattop haircut and stoic approach to life on the island, and to his being a man of his word. (Note: Like almost all contestants on Survivor, Boesch was usually known to viewers by just his first name.) Blunt about survival needs, the Catholic, but non-church-attending Boesch memorably said that the only use for the Bible on the island was as toilet paper. His politically incorrect statements became known as "Rudyisms" and made him even more popular. By the time the final episode arrived and four contestants were left, 69 percent of the viewing public wanted Rudy to win.

After the airing of the show, while praising Hatch as "forthright, trustworthy" and "humorous and kind-hearted," Boesch became publicly known for how he would always qualify his respect for Hatch with comments such as "we've become real good friends, but not in a homosexual way." Boesch would proclaim in front of the cameras, "I wouldn't allow Hatch in my home; wouldn't allow him to meet my family" and, referring to when some Green Berets came to build an obstacle course, "When them Green Berets were here, I made sure they knew Hatch was queer."

Following the initial season of Survivor, there were two elements of controversy raised that involved Boesch. One was a claim from a voted-out contestant that show producer Mark Burnett had at one point influenced tribal council members to vote her out and not Rudy, because he had more appeal to viewers. This was adamantly denied by Burnett and CBS. Another was a claim from a different cast member that Boesch had told them that he had known Burnett before the show. By some accounts, Boesch had been cast by responding to a newspaper advertisement. However, he had also previously worked in 1996 as part of the logistics team for Burnett's earlier adventure race show Eco-Challenge. Boesch said several hundred others had also worked on the show in that capacity and that he had not known Burnett personally, and Burnett said he had not realized Boesch's earlier involvement until after Survivor had begun.

=== All-Stars ===
In 2004, Boesch appeared in Survivor: All-Stars, set on the Pearl Islands of Panama. At age 75, Boesch was the oldest contestant ever, topping the record he set four years prior. Initially placed in the Saboga tribe, he formed an early alliance with Rupert Boneham and again drank potentially tainted water. After he complained of pain from an injured ankle and the tribe lost its second straight immunity challenge, other members became concerned about his age and ability to compete. In a 3–to–2 decision, he became the second person voted off the show placing 17th.

=== Post-Survivor fame ===
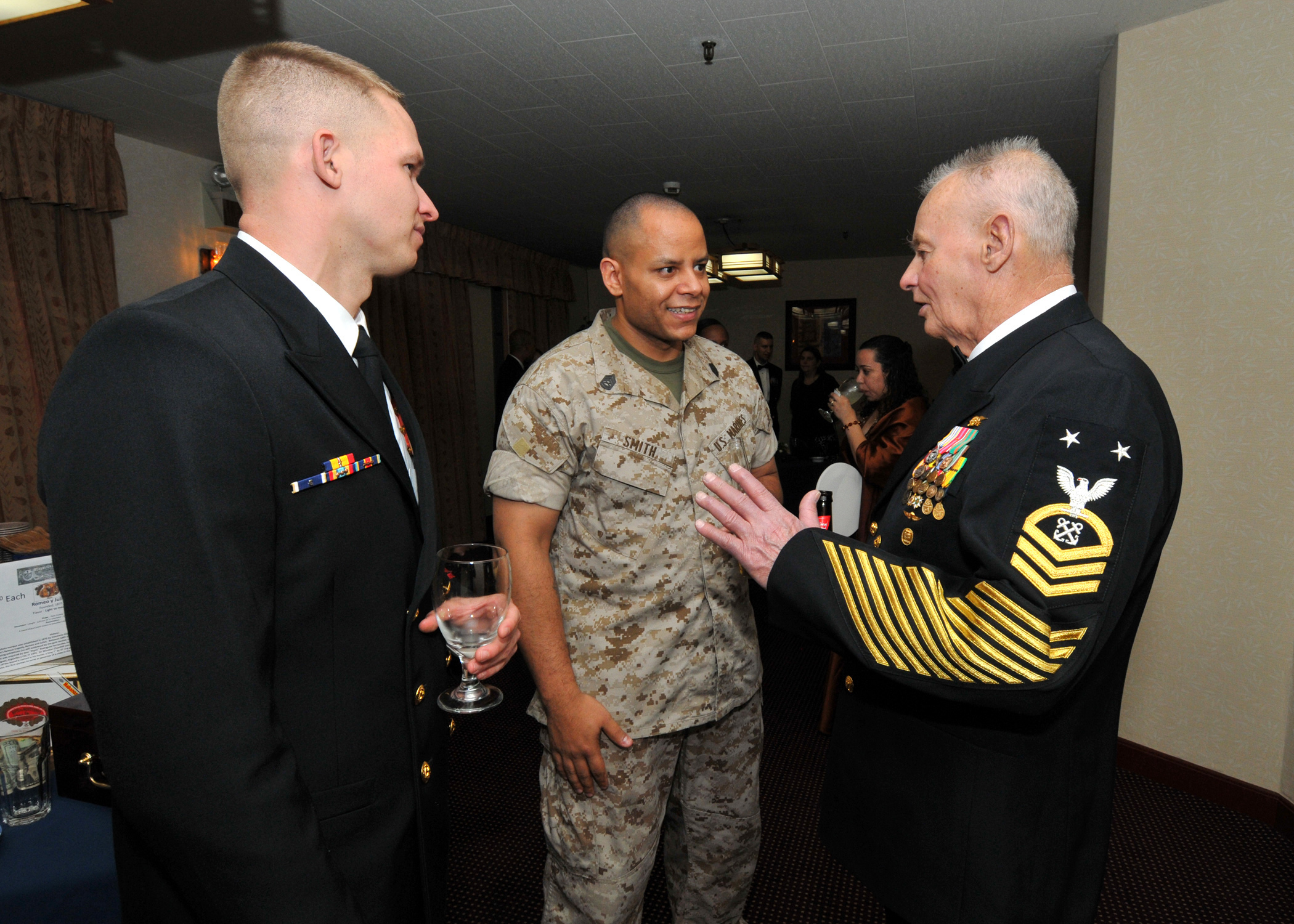
Two senior enlisted servicemembers chat with BMCM (SEAL) (Ret.) Rudy Boesch during a 2010 "Dining Out" event commemorating the 117th birthday of the chief petty officer corps. His dress blue uniform has gained note for how many ribbons, medals, and stripes it bears.

Boesch earned $85,000 for his third-place finish on Survivor and shared the money with his three daughters. But such was the immediate impact of the show that Boesch hired two agents to manage his personal appearances, which included magazine covers, talk shows, television commercials, and Survivor discussion panels. Boesch was honored by both his hometown of Virginia Beach as well as by the Commonwealth of Virginia, where he received a standing ovation in the Virginia House of Delegates after they passed a resolution commending his service. In November 2000, Boesch was included in People magazine's annual "Sexiest Man Alive" issue as the "Sexiest Survivor", reflecting the number of female fans he had garnered.

In February 2001, Blue Box Toys put out a 12-inch (30 cm) action figure of Boesch for its Elite Force Military History collection. He was also licensed to appear in a Survivor slot machine from WMS Gaming, wherein (when it came out several years later) if you hit his bonus, it shows a clip of him from the show. His book The Book of Rudy: The Wit and Wisdom of Rudy Boesch, written with the assistance of Jeff Herman, was published later in 2001 and he went on a twelve-city book tour to promote it. Neither an account of his time on Survivor nor a full biography, it was instead a collection of thoughts on various subjects.

In 2000, he appeared in the JAG television series episode "The Princess and the Petty Officer" as Rear Admiral A.J. Chegwidden's former Navy SEAL instructor. In 2001 he hosted the History channel's Modern Marvels installment Survivor Guide Week. His role consisted of standing in a desert and introducing experts who explained how to cope in a variety of survival scenarios. Boesch later hosted Combat Missions, a Mark Burnett-produced reality series that aired on the USA Network in 2002. He served as the titular commandant of "Camp Windstorm", the garrison location in the Mojave Desert where the show took place. Variety wrote that his hosting duties were "one-dimensional" and that, "Looking menacing and acting rigorous, his only job is to explain rules and oversee discharges."

As someone who would never consider an acting career, Boesch felt challenged with the scripted lines given to him both on JAG and Combat Missions. Citing his inability to memorize dialogue, he explained "anything over five words, I'm mumbling." He expressed that people recognized him wherever he goes, and that he was surprised his 15 minutes of fame had lasted this long.

== Later activities ==
Boesch's career had become known enough that mentions of him were included in novels about SEALs, including S. M. Gunn's 2004 SEALs Sub Strike: Operation Black Snow and Charles Ingram's 2007 Deep Siege. His uniform is on display at the National Navy UDT-SEAL Museum in Florida, a reflection both of his record-setting service with the SEALs and his fame from Survivor.

Boesch's wife of 53 years, Marge, died on November 1, 2008, following a long illness. Survivor: Gabon showed an "In Memory" dedication to Marge during its 8th episode.

Boesch remained one of the most popular contestants among Survivor viewers, with a survey of them after the show's first ten seasons placing him among the top ten contestants. In 2013, Survivor fan site "Survivor Oz" ranked Boesch as among the top 25 greatest players of all time, at #23. In 2015, Boesch was one of three inductees into Xfinity's "Survivor Hall of Fame," alongside Jerri Manthey and Benjamin "Coach" Wade. In a 2015 retrospective interview, Probst said that the first season's outcome, when the "most likable and root-worthy guy" Boesch failed to win and the villainous Hatch did, established that the game's appeal to viewers did not depend upon the personal qualities of the victor and helped explain the show's long-lasting appeal.

On October 27, 2010, Boesch was one of 14 initial inductees to the Commando Hall of Honor at Macdill Air Force Base. Boesch hosted the annual Rudy Run SEAL Challenge on Naval Amphibious Base Little Creek to raise funds for the charity Naval Special Warfare Foundation. He was represented by the Premier Speakers Bureau. Boesch's perceived slurs towards homosexuals irked some, going back to the initial Survivor season. He was criticized for ostensibly homophobic comments he made both in 2012 at the 50th Anniversary of the SEALs and in 2013 at the season finale of Survivor: Caramoan.

By 2015, Boesch was living in a retirement community in Virginia Beach and leading his fellow residents in exercise-based activities.

== Filmography ==
=== Television ===
Year	Title	Role	Notes
2000	Survivor: Borneo	Contestant	Eliminated; 3rd place
2004	Survivor: All-Stars	Contestant	Eliminated; 17th place

== Death ==
By August 2019, Boesch suffered from Alzheimer's disease and required around-the-clock care. False reports of his demise surfaced on August 1, 2019, which were debunked by his family. Boesch died on November 1, 2019, at age 91.

The New York Times summarized his fame as "An ex-Navy man, he was the oldest, and probably bluntest, castaway ever to appear on CBS’s popular reality show, becoming a Season 1 fan favorite."

Host Jeff Probst posted on Twitter,

"The Survivor family has lost a legend. ... He is one [of] the most iconic and adored players of all time. And he served our country as a 45-year Navy SEAL. Rudy is a true American hero."

The November 6, 2019 episode of Survivor: Island of the Idols included a brief, silent screen in tribute to him at the end of the episode.
