= Jerri Manthey =

American actress and reality TV contestant (born 1970)

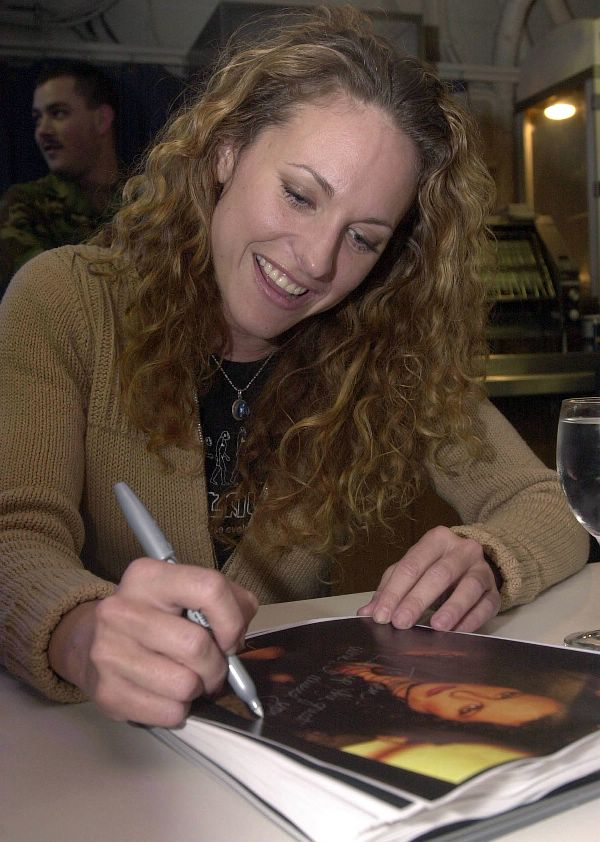
- Manthey in 2005
- Born: September 5, 1970 (age 55); Stuttgart, West Germany
- Occupations: Actress and television personality
- Years active: 1996–present
- Television: Survivor: The Australian Outback; Survivor: All-Stars; Survivor: Heroes vs. Villains

Jerri Manthey (born September 5, 1970) is an American actress and television personality. She was a three-time contestant on Survivor, placing 8th on Survivor: The Australian Outback, 10th on Survivor: All-Stars, and was eliminated at the final four on Survivor: Heroes vs. Villains.

== Early life ==
Jerri Manthey was born in Stuttgart, West Germany to American parents and attended both high school and college in Germany. Manthey's father, Cyril, was a career member of the United States Army and served several years in Germany. In 1991, Manthey worked for Hooters at their Huntsville, Alabama restaurant before moving to their restaurant in Oklahoma City. She later appeared in the Summer 1992 edition of Hooters magazine with country singer Vince Gill. Manthey worked as a bartender in Los Angeles while attempting to build an acting career. In 1995, Manthey appeared in the music video for Def Leppard's single "When Love & Hate Collide".

== Survivor ==
=== The Australian Outback ===
In 2001, Manthey appeared on the television reality show Survivor: The Australian Outback. At the beginning of the game, Manthey was initially sorted into the Ogakor tribe, where she formed multiple conflicts with her fellow tribemates, notably Keith Famie over his cooking skills, which put her on the initial chopping block; she was spared from an early elimination due to her tribe winning the first immunity challenge.

After Ogakor lost the second immunity challenge, Manthey was targeted as her personality rubbed people the wrong way, yet she was spared after she accused Kel Gleason of having snuck beef jerky into the game and having the majority believing her and voting Gleason out. Manthey later confessed that she was attracted to tribemate Colby Donaldson, which she used to help her survive the next two tribal councils Ogakor attended.

On Day 19, the tribes merged into Barramundi after Michael Skupin's evacuation left ten players in the game, five from each tribe. Anticipating a tied vote, Ogakor took advantage of Jeff Varner's previous votes and targeted him, allowing Ogakor to vote him out and secure the majority over Kucha; the majority of five – Famie, Donaldson, Manthey, Tina Wesson and Amber Brkich – successfully eliminated Alicia Calaway from Kucha at the following tribal council.

With eight players remaining, Manthey and Brkich were told to target Elisabeth Filarski, but Donaldson, Famie and Wesson decided to turn on Manthey as she annoyed them and Ogakor would still have the majority, sending Manthey home on Day 27 as the second member of the jury in a 6–2 vote.

At the season's final tribal council, Manthey voted for Wesson to win over Donaldson as she felt betrayed by the latter. Wesson would go on to win the season in a 4–3 vote.

=== All-Stars ===
In 2004, Manthey was cast in the show's eighth season (the first to feature returning players), Survivor: All-Stars, where she started out on the Saboga tribe. Jenna Lewis, Tina Wesson, and Ethan Zohn. Manthey initially attempted to improve her game by not being overly opinionated; she nevertheless got into multiple arguments at the Saboga tribe camp, particularly with Rupert Boneham during a shelter-building challenge. Despite losing the first two immunity challenges, Manthey was spared from elimination as Tina Wesson, a past winner, and Rudy Boesch, who proved weak in challenges, were considered greater targets by the majority.

On Day 13, the tribes participated in a reward challenge where the tribe that finished last would be absorbed into the other two. Saboga lost, and Manthey and Ethan Zohn were drafted into the Mogo Mogo tribe. The new tribe lost the three following immunity challenges; Manthey surviving every tribal council thanks to aligning with van den Berghe and Vavrick-O'Brien to vote out larger threats in Richard Hatch, Colby Donaldson and Zohn.

On Day 22, at the final ten, an unexpected second switch left Manthey on the Chapera tribe, containing all her fellow former Mogo Mogo members in Vavrick-O'Brien, van den Berghe and Shii Ann Huang, and joined by former Chapera member, Amber Brkich. After Chapera lost the next immunity challenge, Manthey was initially confident she would be safe as Brkich was a strategic outsider on the tribe; however, a deal struck by van den Berghe and Mogo Mogo member Rob Mariano saved Brkich, eliminating Manthey in tenth place on Day 24 by a unanimous 4–1 blindside.

=== Heroes vs. Villains ===
Manthey competed for her third and final time on the show's tenth anniversary and twentieth season, Survivor: Heroes vs. Villains, as a member of the Villains tribe. Manthey initially formed a bond with Coach Wade, which fellow tribemates teased the two about being in love. The two found themselves in an early alliance with Tyson Apostol, Sandra Diaz-Twine, Courtney Yates and Rob Mariano, which was opposed by an alliance of Parvati Shallow, Danielle DiLorenzo and Russell Hantz. The Villains experienced an early winning streak in challenges.

When a hidden immunity idol sent Apostol home at a double tribal council, Manthey joined Shallow, DiLorenzo and Hantz's alliance in voting out Mariano, Coach and Yates before the two tribes would merge.

The Heroes and Villains tribes, each consisting of five members, merged into the Yin Yang tribe on Day 25. Initially deadlocked in a 5–5 tied vote between respective targets Manthey and perceived Heroes tribe leader J.T. Thomas, to everyone's surprise Shallow played two hidden immunity idols and saved Manthey. This allowed the Villains to eliminate Thomas and secure a majority, through which the Heroes' Amanda Kimmel and Candice Woodcock - the latter an accomplice in eliminating the former - were voted out consecutively.

With seven players remaining, Hantz targeted DiLorenzo as he felt she and Shallow were too close, with Manthey as the swing vote in the plan; Manthey joined in after DiLorenzo accidentally revealed that the former was at the bottom of the alliance. Rupert Boneham and Colby Donaldson, the last two Heroes remaining, were the next two players voted out. Hantz, winning the Day 38 final immunity challenge, successfully encouraged Diaz-Twine and Shallow to vote Manthey out due to the latter's strong social game. In 4th place, Manthey was unanimously voted out 3–1, becoming the final member of the jury.

At the final tribal council, Manthey initially planned on voting for Hantz, but switched her vote to Shallow after her answer to Manthey's jury question. Shallow would go on to lose in second place to Diaz-Twine in a 6–3–0 vote, making Diaz-Twine the show's first two-time winner.

=== Post-Survivor fame ===
Following her appearance on Survivor, Manthey appeared on the reality shows Blind Date, The Surreal Life and The Joe Schmo Show. Manthey was considered to return as a contestant for Survivor 50: In the Hands of the Fans, but she was not included in the final group of contestants.

== Modeling ==
Manthey posed nude in the September 2001 issue of Playboy.

== 2010 removal from air flight ==
On March 3, 2010, while Survivor: Heroes vs. Villains was still being aired, Manthey was removed from a US Airways flight in Charlotte, North Carolina, after a disagreement with the flight crew. She posted an open letter to US Airways management on her Facebook page sharing the details of her experience.

== Filmography ==
=== Television ===
Year	Title	Role	Notes
1999	That Championship Season	Claire	Television film
2000	Survivor: The Australian Outback	Contestant	8th place
2003	The Surreal Life	Herself	8 episodes
2004	Survivor: All-Stars	Contestant	10th place
2005	Komodo vs. Cobra	Sandra	Television film
2009	Star-ving	Dave's Lawyer	Episode: "Begging Ed"
2010	Survivor: Heroes vs. Villains	Contestant	4th place
2013–14	TMI Hollywood	Various	6 episodes
