= Gary Wood (filmmaker) =

American filmmaker and screenwriter

Gary Wood is an American screenwriter and independent filmmaker from Indianapolis, Indiana. He started screenwriting during his six-year service in the U.S. Navy. Long days aboard the U.S.S. Nassau gave him time to hone his writing. Once out of the Navy, he kept on writing, whenever possible, while working in a variety of businesses. In 2001, he wrote a script for Saving Star Wars, "which became a cult movie hit about two Star Wars fans who accidentally kidnap George Lucas." He penned and produced Open Mic'rs in 2005.

Wood first dabbled in screenwriting during a six-year stint in the Navy. Long days aboard the U.S.S. Nassau gave him time to hone his writing. Once out of the Navy, he kept on writing, whenever possible, while working in a variety of businesses. In 2001, he wrote a script for Saving Star Wars, which became a cult movie hit about two Star Wars fans who accidentally kidnap George Lucas. Later, Wood penned and produced Open Mic'rs, a mockumentary that includes improvisations by comedians. It was filmed in Indianapolis in 2005. Actors in the movie include Rupert Boneham, Cindy Morgan, David Prowse and Landon Lueck. The film premiered at the IMAX Theater in Indianapolis in 2006.

== Works ==
- My Kid Brother's Band, about a visit by guitarist George Harrison to his sister's home in Benton, Illinois in 1963, a year before he and The Beatles "invaded" the United States. ("A tiny Benton radio station was actually the first to play a Beatles record in '63, after considerable begging by George and his sis, Louise.")
- Sissies, about two sisters "living totally different lifestyles"
- One Wild and Crazy City, a documentary about the "long-lost connection between comedian Steve Martin and Terre Haute".
- Open Mic'rs, a mockumentary made in Indianapolis that includes improvisations from comedians.
- Saving Star Wars (writer and producer), an independent comedy film about two men's quest to find filmmaker George Lucas and convince him to continue making Star Wars movies
