= Saving Star Wars =

- Directed by: Gary Wood
- Written by: Gary Wood
- Produced by: Gary Wood; Justin Escue
- Starring: Joe Urban; Jim Peterson; David Prowse; Lee Ann Millen; George Starkey
- Distributed by: Woodworks Films
- Release date: June 9, 2004
- Running time: 117 minutes
- Language: English

Saving Star Wars is a 2004 independent film by Woodworks Films that was written and produced by Gary Wood. The title is a play on the titles of the World War II movie Saving Private Ryan and Star Wars. The first preview of the film was at a film festival called Reel Competition, where it was rated highly by the film-goers. It features David Prowse, the actor who played Darth Vader in the Star Wars trilogy.

The film was shot in central Indiana, and shown at the Star Wars Celebration III convention in 2005 in a nearby IMAX theater. The original concept poster was designed by Associate Producer Josh Shanks and Travis Bow.

== Plot ==
Though a Star Wars fan as a child, life holds no magic or adventure for Woody Garrison (Joe Urban). Divorced and working two jobs to pay medical bills for his terminally ill son, he now sees Star Wars as just a movie. Only at the request of his son (Scott Heffern II) does he set off with his childhood buddy, Hank (Jim Peterson), on a quest to find filmmaker George Lucas (George Starkey) and convince him to continue making Star Wars movies. Through a series of mishaps, Woody and Hank accidentally kidnap Lucas and allow the script for Episode III to fall into the hands of an unbalanced fan (Scott C. Sendelweck), a murderous producer, and a certain Dark Lord-portraying actor (David Prowse). To his surprise, Woody finds himself in the middle of an adventure with the fate of the Star Wars movie-making empire hanging in the balance.

== Awards and accolades ==
- 2005 Winner, Best Supporting Actor, Jim Peterson at the London Science Fiction Film Festival
- 2005 Winner, Best Comedy, Melbourne Independent Film Festival, Melbourne, Florida
- 2005 nominee: Best Screenplay, London Science Fiction Film Festival
- 2005 Closing Night Selection, London Science Fiction Film Festival
