= Amber Mariano =

American television personality (born 1978)

- Born: Amber Brkich; August 11, 1978 (age 48)
- Education: Westminster College (BA)
- Occupation: Television personality
- Television: Survivor: The Australian Outback; Survivor: All-Stars (winner); The Amazing Race 7 (runner-up); The Amazing Race 11; Survivor: Winners at War
- Spouse: Rob Mariano (m. 2005)
- Children: 4

Amber Mariano (née Brkich; born August 11, 1978) is an American television personality and winner of Survivor: All-Stars with its $1,000,000 prize, after appearing as a contestant on one of its predecessors, Survivor: The Australian Outback, where she placed 6th. Later, she was a participant in the 40th season, Survivor: Winners at War, where she placed 20th, being the second voted out and the first member of the jury. She is married to fellow Survivor contestant of Survivor: Marquesas, Survivor: All-Stars, Survivor: Heroes vs. Villains, Survivor: Winners at War and winner of Survivor: Redemption Island, Rob Mariano, with whom she appeared on The Amazing Race twice, where they placed 2nd and 8th. The two have four daughters together.

== Personal life ==
Amber Brkich went to Beaver Area High School. She is a graduate of Westminster College in New Wilmington, Pennsylvania, north of Pittsburgh, where she earned a Bachelor of Arts degree in public relations, with a minor in speech communications, in 2000. She is an alumna of Alpha Gamma Delta, having served as vice president and new member coordinator while still in school. She is of Croatian and Albanian descent on her paternal side.

She began a relationship with fellow reality star Rob Mariano in 2003, when they formed an alliance as castmates on Survivor: All-Stars. They became engaged on May 9, 2004, during the show's live finale at Madison Square Garden in New York City, and married on April 16, 2005, at Atlantis Paradise Island in The Bahamas. CBS aired a two-hour special about the wedding, entitled Rob and Amber Get Married, on May 24, 2005. After their marriage, the couple moved to Pensacola, Florida. They have four daughters: Lucia Rose (born July 4, 2009), Carina Rose (born December 10, 2010), Isabetta Rose (born May 5, 2012), and Adelina Rose (born June 20, 2014). Their family are members of the Catholic Church.

== Survivor ==
=== The Australian Outback ===
Brkich was a participant in the second season of Survivor, having auditioned for the season on a whim. She was a member of the green Ogakor tribe, and she was quick to fortify a strong friendship with fellow contestant Jerri Manthey, who helped construct an alliance with Colby Donaldson and Mitchell Olson. Upon the merge, Ogakor managed to use the knowledge that one of Kucha's members, Jeff Varner, had received votes beforehand, and eliminated him, thus gaining a numeric advantage over the other group. Later in the game however, it was decided by a majority of the remaining players that Brkich had played "under-the-radar", and she was sent home, ultimately landing in sixth place. As a member of the jury, she cast her vote for Donaldson, who lost to Tina Wesson in a 4–3 vote.

Immediately following her appearance on Survivor: The Australian Outback, Brkich appeared on the cover of Stuff magazine. Maxim ranked her as the 50th most beautiful woman in the world in 2004 and 73rd in 2005. She also appeared in various commercials for Adelphia Cable, Rite Aid drugstores, and Mountaineer Racetrack in West Virginia.

=== All-Stars ===
Brkich was a member of the Chapera tribe, a group including Rob Mariano, Sue Hawk, and fellow The Australian Outback player Alicia Calaway. In the season's premiere episode, Mariano and Brkich agreed to form an alliance. They faced their first Tribal Council in the fourth episode, and their relationship was a matter of discussion; but ultimately, it was Rob Cesternino who was sent home. Due to a twist that dissolved one of the three tribes, Jenna Lewis and Rupert Boneham joined the Chapera tribe leading to Mariano and Brkich quickly fortifying a long-term alliance with the duo.

Mid-game, a tribal shuffle managed to swap every contestant to the opposite tribe with the exception of Brkich, who remained on the Chapera tribe with Lex van den Berghe, Shii Ann Huang, Jerri Manthey, and Kathy Vavrick-O'Brien. The tribe went on to lose the next challenge and upon leaving, Mariano informed van den Berghe that he would take care of him if he took care of Brkich. Van den Berghe, Huang, and Vavrick-O'Brien voted out Manthey in hopes that Mariano would keep his word.

After the merge, Mariano double-crossed van den Berghe despite having promised to take care of him in return for van den Berghe protecting Brkich; van den Berghe kept his part of the bargain, but Mariano coldly stabbed him in the back upon returning and led the successful push to have him voted out. Mariano and Brkich also managed to maintain several "alliances," including their agreement with Boneham and Lewis, one with "Big Tom" Buchanan, and one with Calaway. Eventually, the pair ended up in the Final Four with Lewis and Boneham. Once there, Brkich won her first individual Immunity challenge, and she and Mariano convinced Lewis to vote out Boneham instead of forcing a tie. In the final three, Mariano won immunity and chose Brkich to continue with him to the Final Two. Facing the jury, they both met criticism for their gameplay. Ultimately, Brkich was victorious by becoming the Sole Survivor in a 4–3 vote, securing her the win by receiving votes from van den Berghe, Calaway, Huang, and Buchanan while Mariano received votes from Vavrick-O'Brien, Boneham and Lewis. Before the vote was read, Mariano proposed to Brkich, which she accepted without hesitation.

=== Winners at War ===
After a 16-year and 32-season hiatus, Brkich, now using her married name of Mariano, returned to compete on the show's first all-winners season alongside her husband, Rob. She was a member of the Dakal tribe. After they lost the second immunity challenge, Mariano became the second contestant voted off as well as the second person sent to the Edge of Extinction. She lost the two Edge return challenges to Tyson Apostol and Natalie Anderson respectively and then became a permanent member of the jury on day 35. Her placement dropped down to 20th after the first boot Anderson won the second re-entry duel. Mariano voted for Tony Vlachos to win the season, which he did in a 12-4-0 vote to become the second two-time winner in Survivor history.

== The Amazing Race ==
=== Season 7 ===
As an engaged couple, Mariano and Brkich participated in the seventh season of The Amazing Race and came in second place.

During a Roadblock challenge in Mendoza, Argentina, in the third leg of the race, contestants had to eat four pounds of meat. Mariano began the roadblock but very quickly determined he would not or could not eat that quantity. The penalty for not finishing the Roadblock was a 4-hour delay. By convincing several other contestants to refuse to participate, he ensured that several contestants were on the same timetable as he and Brkich. Also in South America, Mariano pooled his money with some other racers to bribe the bus driver to let the teams that contributed off earlier. When he did bribe the driver, Mariano used none of his own money.

In Botswana, during the sixth leg of the race, the couple was criticized by fellow racers, as well as host Phil Keoghan, when they drove by the car accident of another team, brothers Brian and Greg, without stopping. Their fellow competitors all checked in with the brothers prior to continuing on to the next stage of the race.

Mariano and Brkich ultimately finished in second place behind married couple Uchenna and Joyce. Amongst fans, there has been much speculation surrounding the final leg of the race. It has been argued that the production crew had intervened with the airport authorities and aided Uchenna and Joyce onto the same earlier plane as Mariano and Brkich. In the "Revisiting the Race" special feature on the Season 7 DVD, Mariano, along with Uchenna and Keoghan denied these accusations. Mariano describes Uchenna running around frantically trying to get onto the flight, which the final edited version of the show does not portray. Keoghan cites the fact that the decision to re-open the door rested solely with the pilot, and that intervention by the production crew would have resulted in someone leaking such information out. Although Mariano and Brkich lost the one million dollar grand prize and "The Amazing Race 7" winners' title at the final leg of the race, they managed to place 1st in the 2nd, 4th, 7th and 10th legs. They were the only team to not come in last place on any legs of the race.

=== All-Stars ===
In 2007, the Marianos competed on the All-Stars season of The Amazing Race as newlyweds. After achieving first place for the first three legs, they came in last and were eliminated in the season's fourth episode which aired on March 11, 2007.

== Rob and Amber: Against the Odds ==
In 2006, the Marianos filmed a ten-episode show for the Fox Reality Channel, Rob and Amber: Against the Odds, which aired in 2007. Set in Las Vegas, the show follows Rob's attempt to become a professional poker player and features professional player Daniel Negreanu tutoring him.

== Filmography ==
=== Television ===
Year	Title	Role	Notes
2001	Survivor: The Australian Outback	Contestant	Eliminated; 6th place
2004	Survivor: All-Stars	Contestant	Winner
2005	The Amazing Race 7	Contestant	Runner-up (with Rob Mariano)
2007	The Amazing Race: All-Stars	Contestant	Eliminated; 8th place (with Rob Mariano)
2020	Survivor: Winners at War	Contestant	Eliminated; 20th place

Preceded by Sandra Diaz-Twine	Winner of Survivor; Survivor: All-Stars	Succeeded by Chris Daugherty
