= Survivor: All-Stars =

- Season 8
- Region 1 DVD slipcase cover
- Presented by: Jeff Probst
- No. of days: 39
- No. of castaways: 18
- Winner: Amber Brkich
- Runner-up: Robert "Boston Rob" Mariano
- Location: Pearl Islands, Panama
- No. of episodes: 17

Release
- Original network: CBS
- Original release: February 1 – May 9, 2004

Additional information
- Filming dates: November 3 – December 11, 2003

Season chronology
- ← Previous; Pearl Islands Next → Vanuatu — Islands of Fire

Survivor: All-Stars is the eighth season of the American CBS competitive reality television series Survivor. It was filmed from November 3, 2003, through December 11, 2003, and premiered on February 1, 2004, after Super Bowl XXXVIII. It was filmed on the Pearl Islands of Panama, also the location of the previous season. Hosted by Jeff Probst, it consisted of the usual 39 days of gameplay with, for the first time, 18 returning competitors from the seven previous seasons instead of the usual 16 new contestants, and three tribes instead of the usual two. The winner was Survivor: The Australian Outback castaway Amber Brkich, who was declared the Sole Survivor after a victory over Survivor: Marquesas castaway Rob Mariano with a 4–3 jury vote.

== Format ==
Survivor is a reality television show created by Mark Burnett and Charlie Parsons and based on the Swedish show Expedition Robinson. The series follows a number of participants who are isolated in a remote location, where they must provide food, fire, and shelter for themselves. Every three days, one participant is removed from the series by majority vote, with challenges being held to give a reward (ranging from living and food-related prizes to a car) and immunity from being voted off the show. The last remaining player is awarded a prize of $1,000,000.

== Contestants ==
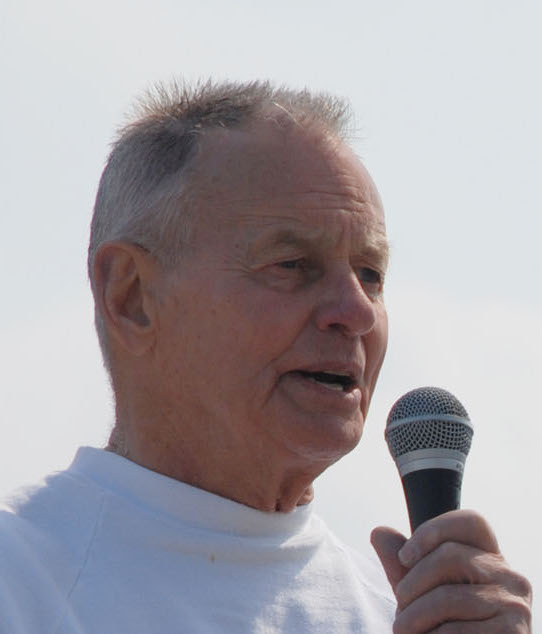
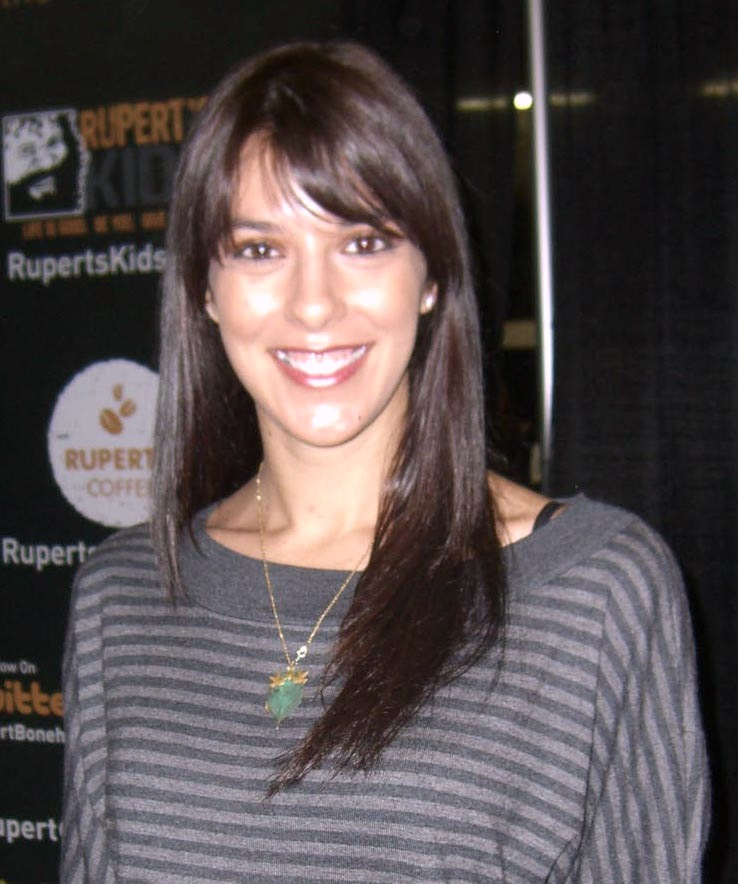
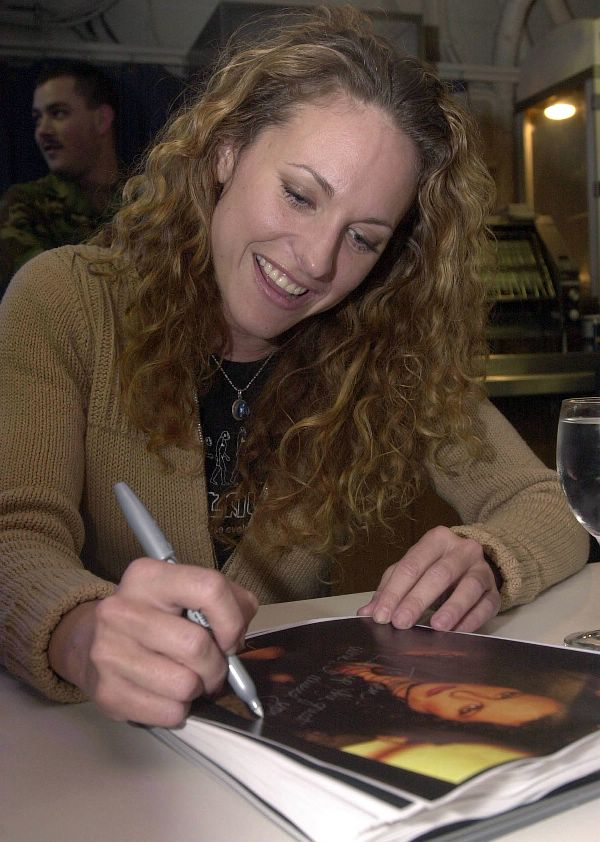
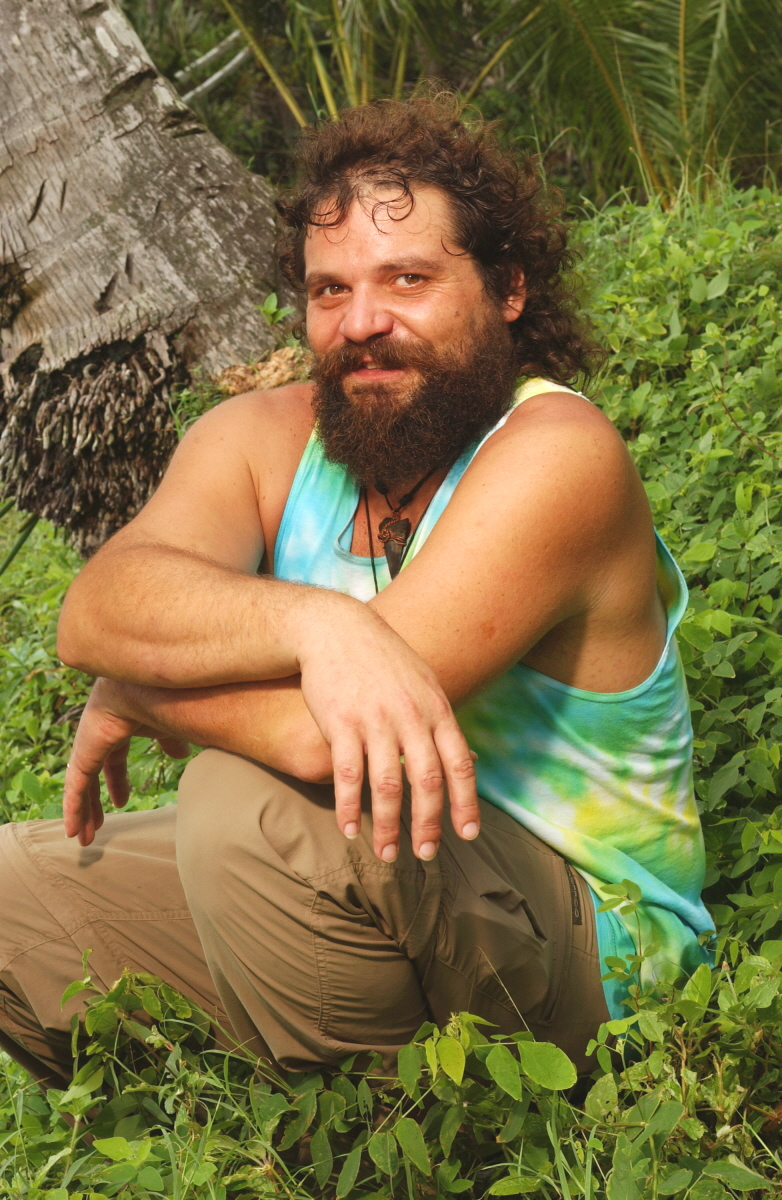
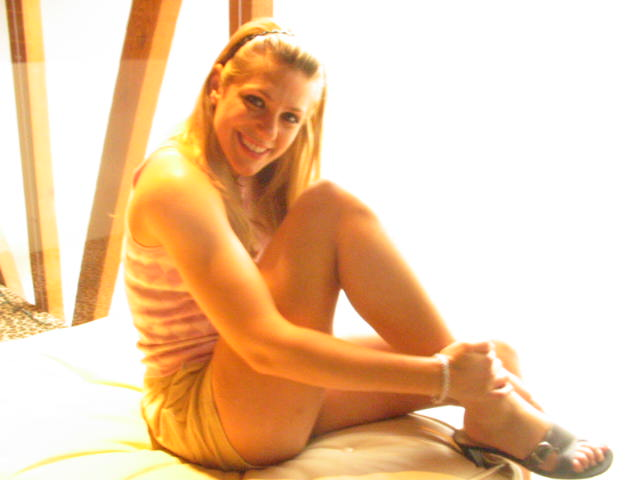
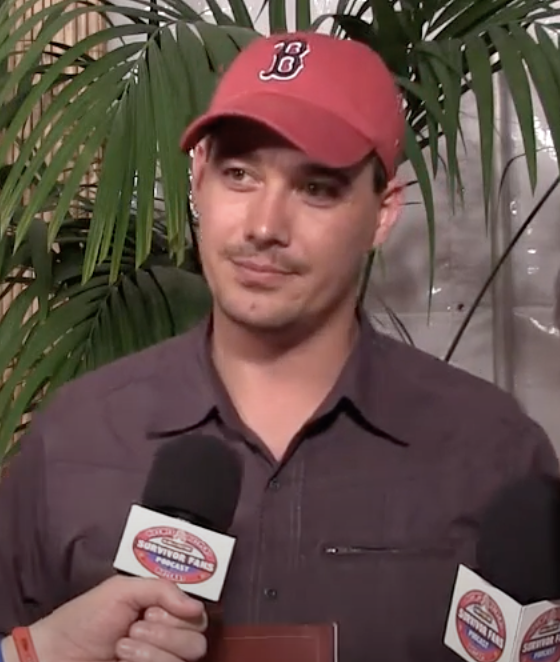
From left to right: Rudy Boesch, Jenna Morasca, Jerri Manthey, Rupert Boneham, Jenna Lewis, and Rob Mariano

The eighteen returning contestants were divided into three tribes of six: Chapera, Mogo Mogo, and Saboga.

List of Survivor: All-Stars contestants
Contestant	Age	From	Tribe				Finish	
Contestant	Age	From	Original	Absorbed	Switched	Merged	Placement	Day
Tina Wesson The Australian Outback	42	Knoxville, Tennessee	Saboga				1st voted out	Day 3
Rudy Boesch Borneo	75	Virginia Beach, Virginia	Saboga				2nd voted out	Day 6
Jenna Morasca The Amazon	22	Bridgeville, Pennsylvania	Mogo Mogo				Quit	Day 9
Rob Cesternino The Amazon	25	Plainview, New York	Chapera				4th voted out	Day 12
Richard Hatch Borneo	42	Middletown, Rhode Island	Mogo Mogo	Mogo Mogo			5th voted out	Day 15
Sue Hawk Borneo	42	Las Vegas, Nevada	Chapera	Chapera			Quit	Day 17
Colby Donaldson The Australian Outback	29	Los Angeles, California	Mogo Mogo	Mogo Mogo			7th voted out	Day 19
Ethan Zohn Africa	30	New York City, New York	Saboga	Mogo Mogo			8th voted out	Day 21
Jerri Manthey The Australian Outback	33	Los Angeles, California	Saboga	Mogo Mogo	Chapera		9th voted out	Day 24
Lex van den Berghe Africa	40	Santa Cruz, California	Mogo Mogo	Mogo Mogo	Chapera	Chaboga Mogo	10th voted out 1st jury member	Day 27
Kathy Vavrick-O'Brien Marquesas	49	Burlington, Vermont	Mogo Mogo	Mogo Mogo	Chapera	Chaboga Mogo	11th voted out 2nd jury member	Day 28
Alicia Calaway The Australian Outback	35	New York City, New York	Chapera	Chapera	Mogo Mogo	Chaboga Mogo	12th voted out 3rd jury member	Day 30
Shii Ann Huang Thailand	29	New York City, New York	Mogo Mogo	Mogo Mogo	Chapera	Chaboga Mogo	13th voted out 4th jury member	Day 33
Tom Buchanan Africa	48	Rich Valley, Virginia	Chapera	Chapera	Mogo Mogo	Chaboga Mogo	14th voted out 5th jury member	Day 36
Rupert Boneham Pearl Islands	39	Indianapolis, Indiana	Saboga	Chapera	Mogo Mogo	Chaboga Mogo	15th voted out 6th jury member	Day 37
Jenna Lewis Borneo	26	Burbank, California	Saboga	Chapera	Mogo Mogo	Chaboga Mogo	16th voted out 7th jury member	Day 38
Rob Mariano Marquesas	27	Canton, Massachusetts	Chapera	Chapera	Mogo Mogo	Chaboga Mogo	Runner-up	Day 39
Amber Brkich The Australian Outback	25	Beaver, Pennsylvania	Chapera	Chapera	Chapera	Chaboga Mogo	Sole Survivor	Day 39

=== Future appearances ===
Rob Mariano, Rupert Boneham, Colby Donaldson, and Jerri Manthey returned to Survivor again in the show's twentieth season, Survivor: Heroes vs. Villains. Mariano played again in Survivor: Redemption Island (and won) and returned in the thirty-ninth season as a mentor in Survivor: Island of the Idols. Boneham and Tina Wesson returned for Survivor: Blood vs. Water. Boneham returned with his wife, Laura, who appeared on this season as loved one; whereas Wesson returned with her daughter, Katie Collins. Ethan Zohn, Amber Brkich (now Mariano), and Rob Mariano returned again for Survivor: Winners at War. Donaldson and Lewis (now Lewis-Dougherty) also competed on Survivor 50: In the Hands of the Fans.

Outside of Survivor, Mariano and Brkich competed together on The Amazing Race 7 and The Amazing Race 11. Richard Hatch competed in the eleventh season of The Apprentice and the seventeenth season of The Biggest Loser. Zohn and Jenna Morasca competed against each other on a "Reality All-Stars" episode of Fear Factor and competed together on The Amazing Race 19. Boneham competed on The Amazing Race 31 with his wife Laura. In 2024, Mariano competed on Deal or No Deal Island. In 2024, Hatch competed on the second season of House of Villains. In 2025, Mariano competed on the third season of the Peacock reality TV series The Traitors. In 2026, Cesternino competed on the fourth season of The Traitors.

== Season summary ==
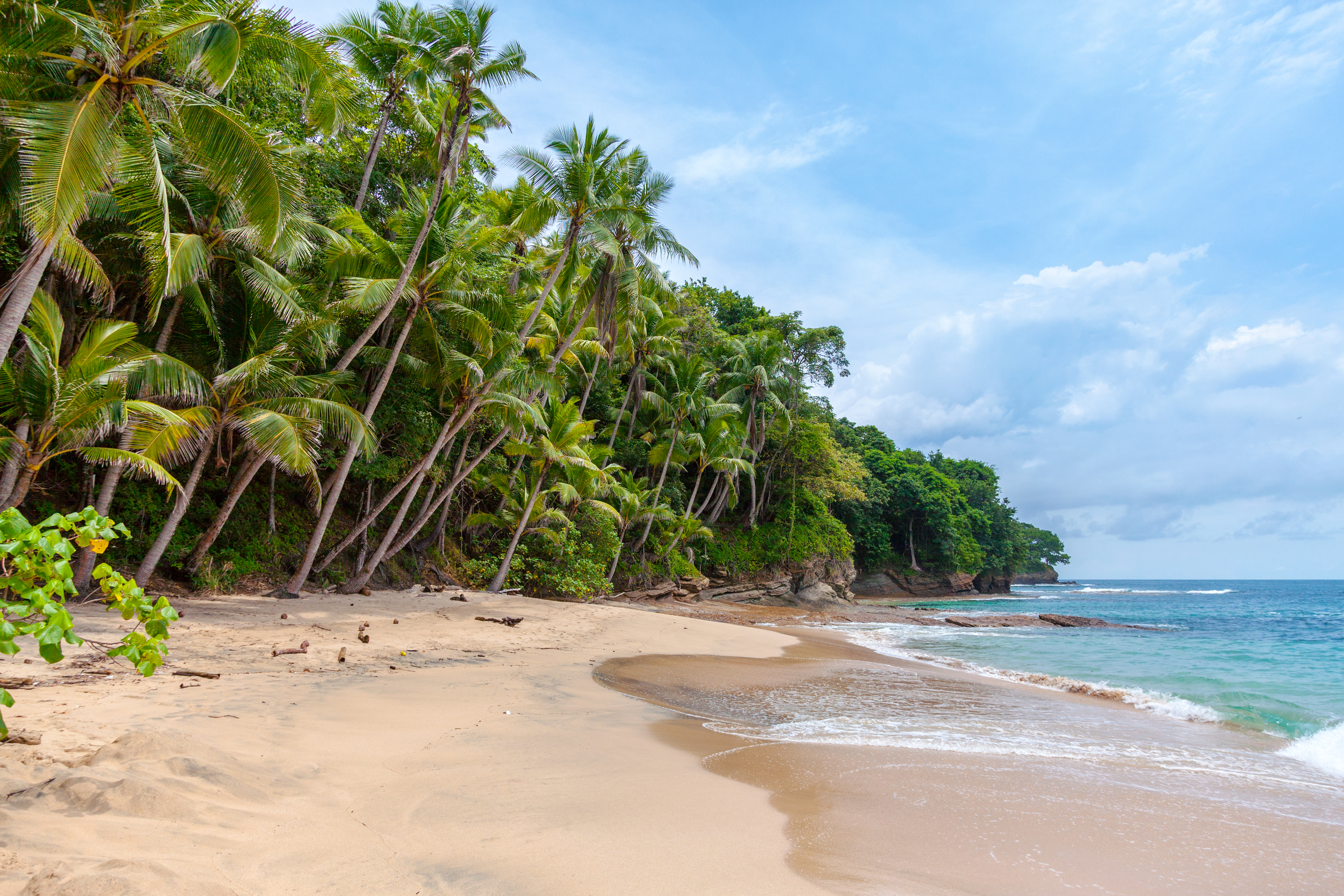
The season was filmed in the Pearl Islands in Panama.

Eighteen players from previous seasons were divided into three tribes of six: Chapera, Mogo Mogo, and Saboga. Saboga lost the first two immunity challenges and, during a shelter-building challenge, built a shelter that quickly flooded. Saboga's poor conditions caught up to them and, after losing a crucial reward challenge, the four remaining members were divided between the other two tribes. Chapera accepted the newcomers, Rupert and Jenna L., and the two entered a solid majority alliance with de facto leader Rob M. and his closest ally and romantic interest Amber. Rob M. and Amber also had alliances with the other members of the tribe, however a winning streak ensured that they never had to break any of them. Mogo Mogo struggled after Lex decided to vote out the stronger members of the tribe in order to cement his control, causing Mogo Mogo to continually lose challenges and approach the merge in the minority.

Two players voluntarily left the game. Jenna M., fearing for her mother's health, decided to drop out on day 9 and return to her mother's side; her mother would die eight days later from cancer. Sue also left, distraught after an incident during an immunity challenge in which a naked Richard had brief but inappropriate bodily contact with her after she forced herself in Hatch's way in the challenge.

With ten players remaining, a tribal switch was held where players took new headbands out of Jeff's bag. In an odd and crazy twist of fate, each player simply drew a buff of the opposite tribe color except Amber, with the net effect of having Amber forced into the old Mogo Mogo tribe under the Chapera name. After Chapera lost the next immunity challenge, Rob M. whispered a deal to Lex to save Amber, promising that he would make it up to him later in the game.

Rob M. and his former tribe mates continued to dominate the rest of the game, systematically eliminating the rest of Lex's alliance. Rob M. and Amber then honored their deal with Rupert and Jenna L., eliminating the rest of the original Chapera tribe. After convincing Jenna L. to vote Rupert out in order to avoid a tie, Rob M. won the final immunity challenge and took Amber into the final two. It was recognized by the jury that the finalists played as a pair, however Rob M.'s strategic gameplay was deemed more outwardly vicious than Amber's quieter and more social game. The jury decided that Rob M. had been too aggressive in his handling of the jury, choosing Amber as the winner in a vote of 4–3.

Challenge winners and eliminations by episode
Episode			Challenge winner(s)		Eliminated	
No.	Title	Original air date	Reward	Immunity	Tribe	Player
1	"They're Back!"	February 1, 2004	None	Chapera	Saboga	Tina
1	"They're Back!"	February 1, 2004	None	Mogo Mogo	Saboga	Tina
2	"Panicked, Desperate, Thirsty as Hell"	February 5, 2004	Saboga (Note: Saboga chose to exchange the blankets for flint, a pot, and a clue to find a hidden key. As a result, both Mogo Mogo and Chapera received the same reward.)	Chapera	Saboga	Rudy
2	"Panicked, Desperate, Thirsty as Hell"	February 5, 2004	Saboga	Mogo Mogo	Saboga	Rudy
3	"Shark Attack"	February 12, 2004	Chapera	None (Note: Due to Jenna M. quitting the game, there was no immunity challenge or Tribal Council.)	Mogo Mogo	Jenna M.
3	"Shark Attack"	February 12, 2004	Mogo Mogo	None	Mogo Mogo	Jenna M.
4	"Wipe Out!"	February 19, 2004	Chapera	Saboga	Chapera	Rob C.
4	"Wipe Out!"	February 19, 2004	Saboga	Mogo Mogo	Chapera	Rob C.
5	"I've Been Bamboozled!"	February 26, 2004	Mogo Mogo (Note: Saboga, having placed last in the reward challenge, was dissolved and the members were redistributed to the two remaining tribes.)	Chapera	Mogo Mogo	Richard
5	"I've Been Bamboozled!"	February 26, 2004	Chapera	Chapera	Mogo Mogo	Richard
6	"Outraged"	March 4, 2004	Mogo Mogo	None (Note: Due to Sue quitting the game, there was no immunity challenge or Tribal Council.)	Chapera	Sue
7	"Sorry...I Blew It"	March 11, 2004	Chapera (Note: Combined reward and immunity challenge.)		Mogo Mogo	Colby
7	"Sorry...I Blew It"	March 11, 2004	Kathy (Note: Chapera earned to right to "kidnap" a member of Mogo Mogo, who would join them on the reward and not attend Tribal Council. They selected Kathy.)		Mogo Mogo	Colby
8	"Pick A Tribemate"	March 17, 2004	Chapera	Chapera	Mogo Mogo	Ethan
9	"A Closer Look (All Star Redux)"	March 24, 2004	Recap Episode			
10	"Mad Scramble and Broken Hearts"	April 1, 2004	None (Note: There was no reward challenge due to the tribe switch.)	Mogo Mogo	Chapera	Jerri
11	"Anger, Tears and Chaos"	April 8, 2004	Rupert (Note: The challenge was individual, and the winner could choose to share their reward with players from either tribe.) [Amber, Jenna L.]	Kathy (Note: The men and women competed separately for immunity.)	Chaboga Mogo	Lex
11	"Anger, Tears and Chaos"	April 8, 2004	Rupert [Amber, Jenna L.]	Rob M.	Chaboga Mogo	Lex
12	"A Thoughtful Gesture or a Deceptive Plan"	April 15, 2004	Alicia, Amber, Rob M., Shii Ann	Rob M. (Note: For winning immunity, Rob M. received an additional reward of a video from home, which he gave up to allow those on the losing team to get letters from home. Rob M. kept immunity.)	Chaboga Mogo	Kathy
12	"A Thoughtful Gesture or a Deceptive Plan"	April 15, 2004	~~Rob M.~~ (Jenna L., Kathy, Rupert, Tom)	Rob M.	Chaboga Mogo	Kathy
13	"Stupid People, Stupid, Stupid People"	April 22, 2004	Rupert	Shii Ann	Chaboga Mogo	Alicia
14	"A Chapera Surprise"	April 29, 2004	Tom (Note: In a twist, the Survivors' family members competed in a food-eating challenge on behalf of their loved ones. Tom's son, Bo, won the challenge and the right to spend a night at the old Chapera camp. Tom chose Rob M. and his brother, Mike, to join them.) [Rob M.]	Tom	Chaboga Mogo	Shii Ann
15	"The Instigator"	May 6, 2004	Rob M. [Amber]	Rob M.	Chaboga Mogo	Tom
16	"The Sole Surviving All-Star"	May 9, 2004	None	Amber	Chaboga Mogo	Rupert
16	"The Sole Surviving All-Star"	May 9, 2004	None	Rob M.	Chaboga Mogo	Jenna L.
17	"The Reunion"	May 9, 2004				

In the case of multiple tribes or castaways who win reward or immunity, they are listed in order of finish, or alphabetically where it was a team effort; where one castaway won and invited others, the invitees are in brackets.

== Episodes ==
No. overall	No. in season	Title	CBS recap	Rating/share (18–49)	Original release date	U.S. viewers (millions)
106	1	"They're Back!"	Recap	14.9/37	January 29, 2004	33.27
Escorted by a local military unit from Panama, the eighteen All-Stars arrived at Panama already divided into three tribes, Chapera, Mogo Mogo, and Saboga. They were only given water canteens to start, and received no information and no fire. The three tribes received maps to their respective camps. When Chapera made it to their camp, they found a well with contaminated water. The tribe decided to focus on building their shelter. Over at Mogo Mogo, the tribe members were scrambling to create alliances. Eventually, they agreed that no one trusted each other, and that they would focus on their camp before alliances. Chapera and Saboga desperately needed fire. At Chapera, Alicia and Rob M. were fighting over whether to focus on fire or shelter. After the fight, Rob M. formed an alliance with Amber, while Rudy and Rupert formed an alliance at Saboga.: Immunity Challenge: The contestants would start on floating platforms, and they must dive down to retrieve a raft on the ocean floor. Then they must transport the raft to the beach, and pass and light torches along the way. The first two tribes to light their torches and bring the raft to the beach win immunity. This challenge was based on the very first challenge of the first season.; At the immunity challenge, Richard decided to be completely naked. Chapera took an early lead. Saboga fell behind when Rupert dove to release a raft that was already free. Although Saboga managed to catch up, Chapera and Mogo Mogo won immunity. When Saboga returned to camp, Jenna L. tried to convince Rudy and Rupert to vote out either Ethan or Tina because they have already won in the past. Ethan tried to convince them that it would be a good strategic move to keep a winner around to guarantee a final two victory. With Ethan and Tina voting for Jenna L., and Jenna L. and Jerri voting for Tina, Rudy and Rupert would be the swing votes. In the end, Rudy and Rupert voted for Tina, sending her home. In addition, since Saboga was unable to start a fire at camp, their torches remained at the Tribal Council until they were able to do so.
107	2	"Panicked, Desperate, Thirsty as Hell"	Recap	8.9/22	February 5, 2004	23.07
As it rained heavily over Saboga, the tribe began losing morale. Rudy took the tribes mind off of hunger and thirst by telling them stories from his time in Vietnam. At Mogo Mogo, the tribe had varying reactions as Richard decided to walk around camp naked. The three tribes were shocked to find a box secured with three locks at each of their camps.: Reward Challenge: The tribes must swim out to retrieve five logs from the ocean. After one log is retrieved, the tribes would lose one member so the final log is carried by only one tribemate. The tribes must then use the logs to build a staircase. The first tribe to build their staircase and use it to reach a platform wins either blankets or flint, a pot, and a clue to the first key of their box. Should the winning tribe choose the second option, all three tribes would receive flint and a pot. Based on a challenge from Africa.; At the reward challenge, Chapera took an early lead while Saboga fell behind as Rudy struggled with the swimming. However, Saboga pulled ahead as they assembled their staircase and won reward. After the challenge, Jeff explained that the boxes at their camps contained rice. After giving Saboga the choice between the two rewards, they chose to take the clue, giving all three tribes flint and a pot.: Immunity Challenge: There are three boats at the ocean floor. Each tribe must swim down to retrieve their boat, and then clear the heavy cargo and water out of it. The first two tribes to row to the shore and carry their boat over the finish line win immunity. Based on a challenge from Marquesas.; At the immunity challenge, Saboga took an early lead, however Chapera and Mogo Mogo pulled ahead by flipping their boat to empty the water, and Chapera and Mogo Mogo ended up winning immunity, sending Saboga to Tribal Council for a second time in a row. After they lost the challenge, the Saboga tribe considered voting out Ethan for being a past winner and Rudy for being the weakest link and for his injured ankle. In the end, Saboga chose to keep their tribe strong, and Rudy was voted out.
108	3	"Shark Attack"	Recap	8.0/20	February 12, 2004	22.35
At Mogo Mogo, Jenna M. was suffering from depression due to leaving behind her mother, who was fighting cancer. Meanwhile. Saboga, having lost two immunity challenges, knew they needed to be productive. Rupert caught a fish for his tribe's lunch.: Reward Challenge: Prior the challenge, each tribe received a box containing supplies from Home Depot. Using the tools provided, each tribe had 24 hours to build a home at their camp. Once the 24 hours is up, Jeff will send a judge to rate the homes on size, strength, and creativity. The top two tribes receive a clue to a key for their box of rice, with the winning tribe winning an additional reward of blankets, mats and wine.; At the reward challenge, Chapera elected Rob M. as their leader as he had experience with construction. Meanwhile, at Saboga, Rupert took the leadership role and came up with the idea of a log cabin. However, things got tense as Jerri disagreed with his design. Mogo Mogo decided to build a treehouse. Colby and Lex worked on Mogo Mogo's home, while Jenna M. and Shii Ann suggested creative touches. However, Colby and Lex weren't interested in the women's ideas, causing a rift between the men and women of Mogo Mogo. The next day, Jeff showed up at each camp with a licensed contractor to judge the homes. The judge inspected all three homes, and decided that Chapera's home was the winner. Chapera received their reward airdropped. After a rainstorm, Jenna M. announced that she had to go home to say goodbye to her mother, who was dying of cancer. When the tribes arrived at what was supposed to be the immunity challenge, Jenna M. announced that she made a bad judgment to join the season due to her mother's terminal illness, and that she was needed at home. Jeff announced that both the immunity challenge and Tribal Council would be canceled due to Jenna M.'s voluntary leave. Jenna M. then boarded the boat to return home. Eight days after Jenna M. returned home, her mother passed away, losing her long cancer battle.
109	4	"Wipe Out!"	Recap	8.7/22	February 19, 2004	22.80
At Chapera, a romantic relationship was developing between Amber and Rob M. At Saboga, heavy rainfalls caused flooding in their home, so they had no protection from the storm. After the storm, Mogo Mogo remade their fire and Richard caught three eels for his tribe.: Reward Challenge: Each castaway will receive a box containing four items. The goal was to match an item to another castaway's item. The tribe scoring the most matches wins a reward of a shower, toilet, mouthwash, shampoo, soap, toilet paper, toothbrushes, and toothpaste. Additionally, the first and second place tribes would receive a clue to one of the keys to open the box of rice. Challenge from The Amazon.; At the reward challenge, it came down to Chapera's Alicia who guessed the final item of Jerri's box correctly, giving Chapera another victory. After enjoying their reward, Chapera went out to find their final key. To show his tribe that he could contribute, Rob C. went to dig for the key, however Rob M. found the key first. Chapera then enjoyed a meal of rice.: Immunity Challenge: One castaway from each tribe would work as a caller to direct their tribemates, who would be blindfolded and teamed up in pairs, in collecting fifteen large puzzle pieces from a field. Once all of the puzzle pieces were collected, the entire tribe would work together to assemble the puzzle. The first two tribes to complete their puzzle win immunity. Based on The Amazon.; At the immunity challenge, the blindfolded castaways were constantly bumping into each other. Saboga finished their puzzle first, and Mogo Mogo placed their last puzzle piece just in time, sending Chapera to their first Tribal Council. After they lost immunity, Alicia, Rob C., and Sue were on the chopping block. The alliance of Amber and Rob M. seemed to be in control. Rob M. attempted to reduce Rob C.'s fear of going home by offering an alliance with him, however Rob C. was skeptical. In the end, Rob C.'s savvy gameplay from his original season caused his tribe to view him as a threat, and he was voted out unanimously.
110	5	"I've Been Bamboozled!"	Recap	8.6/23	February 26, 2004	22.19
The three tribes were surprised to find a bundle of bamboo poles at their camp. They were instructed to construct a raft for the reward challenge out of the bamboo poles. At Saboga, Rupert led his tribe in building a raft that resembled a catamaran. At Mogo Mogo, after attempts to design a raft that would hold everyone's weight failed, the tribe chose to not construct a raft at all and just bundled the poles together. At Chapera, Sue chose to urinate on their raft.: Reward Challenge: Prior to the reward challenge, each tribe had to construct a raft out of bamboo poles. The tribes must use their rafts to rescue two tribemates, and then they must paddle out to a buoy to grab a flag. Then they must race their flag to the shore and cross the finish line. Based on a challenge from Marquesas. The first tribe to cross the finish line wins fishing hooks and a fishing spear, plus a clue to one of the keys to their box of rice. The losing tribe would be dissolved into the first and second place tribes.; Mogo Mogo had a slight lead early on, with Chapera in second place. In the end, Mogo Mogo won, with Chapera in second place. In last place, the Saboga members would be dissolved between Chapera and Mogo Mogo. Ethan and Jerri joined Mogo Mogo, while Jenna and Rupert joined Chapera. When the two tribes returned to camp, the former Saboga members were impressed with their new homes. At Mogo Mogo, Ethan caught fish for his new tribe, causing some rivalry between him and Richard.: Immunity Challenge: The castaways must race across balance beams to retrieve tribe-colored flags. When two castaways of opposing tribes met in the middle, they must battle until one falls into the water. The first tribe to collect twenty flags wins immunity. Based on a challenge from Thailand.; At the immunity challenge, Rob led Chapera to another victory, sending Mogo Mogo to Tribal Council. After they lost immunity, Mogo Mogo planned to vote out Ethan as a past winner. However, Colby changed his mind and felt Ethan would a better asset for the tribe and that Richard was untrustworthy and would tear the tribe apart. Colby and Ethan approached Lex about this plan, and Lex agreed, wanting to take out Richard before a merge. The men then approached Jerri about the plan to eliminate Richard. Colby tried to make sure Richard had no idea that he was in trouble by assuring him that Ethan would be voted out and that the original Mogo Mogos would stick together. Lex then approached Kathy and Shii Ann about taking Richard out and although they agreed, they felt it was a mistake and that Colby was becoming too powerful. Jerri tried to target Colby in order to get revenge on him. She told Richard about the plan to eliminate him and proposed that he and the women team up to take out Colby. Richard agreed and felt confident that the plan to get him out would fail. Kathy soon found herself as a swing vote for she could either side with the men and eliminate Richard and not ruffle any feathers, or go with the women and try to make a bold game move by sending Colby home. At Tribal Council, Colby said that some people were flying under the radar and not really trying to make any bold moves. In the end, Colby's plan came to fruition as the women abandoned the plan and Richard was sent home unanimously.
111	6	"Outraged"	Recap	8.7/23	March 4, 2004	23.22
At Chapera, Rupert became the tribe's provider by catching fish. At Mogo Mogo, there was tension between Colby and Shii Ann due to comments at the previous Tribal Council. Colby was annoyed by Shii Ann's method of flying under the radar. Meanwhile, Sue's tribemates got concerned when she became increasingly upset regarding Richard's brief, but inappropriate bodily contact with her after she forced herself in Hatch's way during the previous challenge. Feeling vulnerable, Amber and Rob formed an alliance with former Saboga members Jenna and Rupert. Prior to the reward challenge, Jeff asked Sue about the incident at the previous challenge, causing her to become enraged. Sue said that she couldn't take it anymore and quit the game. After Sue's departure, the tribes chose to go on with the reward challenge.: Reward Challenge: The tribes must use a balance beam to stomp food items into the air. The goal was for the castaways to all of their tribe's food items into their tribe's basket. The first tribe to have all their food items in the basket wins the basket as reward, plus shish kabobs. This challenge was based on Africa.; Chapera took an early lead as Tom landed a bag into a basket on his first try. However Jenna struggled, causing Mogo Mogo to pull ahead and win the challenge. Sue's departure lead to some discussion on both tribes. Chapera agreed to stick together to the end, and shared a moment for Sue. Due to Sue's departure, there was no immunity challenge nor Tribal Council.
112	7	"Sorry...I Blew It"	Recap	8.7/23	March 11, 2004	22.63
At Mogo Mogo, Jerri awoke with complaints, annoying her tribemates. After receiving tree mail, Chapera discussed their chances of winning the challenge. Rupert motivated his tribe by giving them an inspirational speech.: Reward/Immunity Challenge: The castaways would start on floating platforms. One at a time, the castaways must swim to retrieve designated floating puzzle pieces. Once all puzzle pieces are gathered, they must assemble them to form a boat, which they must paddle to shore. One tribe member must then run through the jungle to raise a flag and retrieve additional paddles. The tribes must then race back to their floating platform. The first tribe to arrive at their platform wins immunity, plus a barbecue feast, beer and dessert. In a twist, the winning tribe must kidnap a member of the losing tribe to join them on the reward. The kidnapped castaway would also be immune from the vote.; At the reward/immunity challenge, Jerri caused Mogo Mogo to fall behind by struggling to unclip a puzzle piece. However, Mogo Mogo pulled ahead when they assembled their puzzle more quickly. However, in the jungle, Rob was able to untie the paddles faster than Ethan, leading Chapera to a victory. Chapera chose to kidnap Kathy, sparing her from Tribal Council. At the reward, the Chaperas attempted to convince Kathy that in the event of a merge, it would be in her best interest to flip on Mogo Mogo. When Mogo Mogo returned to camp, Ethan blamed himself for the loss and felt concerned that due to his performance that the tribe would see no reason to keep him around. Ethan felt his best chance was to target Jerri. Colby and Ethan conspired to vote out Jerri, with the approval of Lex. However, Lex felt that this was the perfect opportunity to make a bold move by taking out Colby as he felt his mistake in Africa was not making a big move. Lex then approached Jerri, mentioning that Colby was the biggest threat. Jerri was more than happy to send him home, as she still felt ill feelings towards Colby for his betrayal on her back in Australia. Lex then approached Shii Ann about the plan as well. Shii Ann agreed but had second thoughts as she was getting tired of Jerri's constant complaining and her laziness. In the end, Shii Ann sided with Lex and Jerri, and therefore Colby was voted out.
113	8	"Pick A Tribemate"	Recap	8.5/22	March 18, 2004	21.89
During a rainstorm, Kathy returned to Mogo Mogo from her reward with the Chapera tribe while her tribe was at Tribal Council. Kathy attempted to build a fire. As morning came, the tribes received tree mail instructing them to choose one ambassador to go to the other tribe's camp. Mogo Mogo chose Kathy, who had already built a relationship with Chapera. A draw determined that Jenna from Chapera would be sent to Mogo Mogo. When Jenna and Kathy arrived at the opposing camps, they learned that they would choose three items that their tribe would receive should they win reward.: Reward Challenge: Each castaway would face off with a castaway of the same gender on the opposing tribe on a free-spinning log. First person to hit the water would be out of the challenge, and the winner would score a point for their tribe. The first tribe to score five points wins reward. Based on a challenge from The Amazon. Should Chapera win, they would be given Mogo Mogo's grill, a bag of their rice, and their Hawaiian sling. Should Mogo Mogo win, they would be given Chapera's blanket, parachute, and tarp.; At the reward challenge, Mogo Mogo took an early lead as Shii Ann outlasted Alicia. However, Chapera tied when Rob outlasted Ethan. In the end, Amber outlasted Kathy and scored the fifth and final point for Chapera. When Chapera, returned to camp, they celebrated their new tools, and Amber and Rob shared their first kiss.: Immunity Challenge: The castaways must face off with members of the other tribe using weapons, blowguns, and spears to hit targets. The final round would be between one member from each tribe. Each finalist receives a bow and arrow, with the number of arrows determined by how many hits their tribe got in the first round. Once all the arrows are used, the person with their arrow closest to the target's center wins immunity for their tribe. Based on a challenge from The Amazon.; At the immunity challenge, Jerri was the only castaway to hit the target with a blowgun. The final round consisted of Mogo Mogo's Jerri and Chapera's Rob. Rob led Chapera to another victory. After Mogo Mogo lost immunity, Lex formed an alliance to outlast Ethan. Lex decided to tell Ethan that he was going home next, which angered Ethan, who attempted to form an alliance to outlast Jerri. In the end, Ethan's attempt to target Jerri was unsuccessful, and he was voted out unanimously.
114	9	"A Closer Look (All Star Redux)"	N/A	TBA	March 25, 2004	16.70
Recap of the events in the All-Stars season with some additional never seen footage thrown in.
115	10	"Mad Scramble and Broken Hearts"	Recap	8.3/23	April 1, 2004	21.69
At Chapera, Rupert and Tom woke up early to work. Tom decided to go fishing for the first time and caught a fish. After losing three immunity challenges in a row, the morale at Mogo Mogo was low. The tribes received tree mail with paint in the color of their tribe. Mogo Mogo decided to save the paint, while the Chapera tribe used it to paint each other's bodies. As the tribes assembled for a reward challenge, they were told that there was no challenge. Instead, members of Chapera and Mogo Mogo were instructed to pair off and enjoy a picnic. After the castaways completed their picnic, they thought that they were going to merge, but instead discovered they were actually switching tribes. The castaways were instructed to draw a random buff from a vase. By chance, each castaway was switched to the opposite tribe, with the exception of Amber, who remained on the Chapera tribe with the four former Mogo Mogo tribe members. With Amber now on the opposing tribe, Rob was upset to be separated from her. The new Chapera tribe, consisting of the entire former Mogo Mogo tribe and Amber, was impressed by their new camp. The new Mogo Mogo tribe, consisting entirely of former Chapera tribe members, was disappointed with their new home. Prior to the immunity challenge, Rob expressed his desire to go the final two with Amber and would do whatever it would take to get her there. Rob decided that he needed to make a big move that would affect everybody.: Immunity Challenge: The tribes must answer questions about Survivor from season one to season seven. The first tribe to answer ten questions correctly wins immunity.; At the immunity challenge, the score was even until Mogo Mogo answered a question incorrectly. However, Mogo Mogo pulled ahead and evened the score. With the scores tied at 10–10, the castaways were asked a tiebreaker question. The castaways were asked to list the first castaways voted out in the first seven seasons. Chapera answered six out of seven correctly, however Mogo Mogo got all seven correct, winning immunity. As the tribes gathered to return to their camps, Rob approached Lex and offered him a deal, "You take care of her, I'll take care of you." Lex promised that he would do his best. When Chapera returned to camp, it came down to Amber, as the only former Chapera member on the tribe, and Jerri, who was on the chopping block previously due to her perceived lack of work ethic. Amber lobbied Kathy to save her, while Jerri lobbied Lex. In the end, Lex stayed true to his deal with Rob, and Jerri was voted out.
116	11	"Anger, Tears and Chaos"	Recap	7.9/24	April 8, 2004	20.76
After Amber was switched to the opposing tribe, Rob was worried that she may have been voted out. Knowing that his closest ally could be out of the game, he formed an alliance with Alicia. When the tribes gathered for the reward challenge, Rob was relieved to see that Amber was spared.: Reward Challenge: This challenge was a Survivor version of musical chairs. The castaways must dive underwater to retrieve a colored pot. Castaways without a pot would be eliminated from the challenge until there are only three left. The last three would then race to the shore carrying a heavy crate. The first castaway to carry their crate across the finish line wins the reward of a night at a spa along with a feast and a massage. Based on a challenge from Marquesas.; During the reward challenge, Lex, Rob, and Rupert moved on to the final round, and Rupert was the first to cross the finish line, winning reward. Rupert chose Amber and Jenna to join him on the reward. As the tribes gathered for the immunity challenge, Amber, Jenna, and Rupert were dropped off by helicopter. Jeff then announced that the tribes were merging, and that they would live at the old Saboga camp. They were given new blue buffs, as well as two Hawaiian slings and a tarp. The castaways chose the name "Chaboga Mogo" for the merged tribe by combining the names of the three original tribes. Lex approached Rob about his deal. Rob promised to keep him safe, however later revealed that he never had any intention of keeping his deal with Lex and that it was all a game so that Amber could stay. Rob then approached Amber to tell her that Lex was going next. Amber was hesitant, as she had promised Lex and Kathy that Rob and her would be the final four. Amber didn't want to break her word just yet and tried to convince Rob that they should play it safe by voting out Jenna or Rupert, but Rob felt that Lex was too big a threat to keep around.: Immunity Challenge: The men and the women competed separately for immunity. The first round is a competition to determine who can hold their breath underwater the longest. Two men and two women would move on the final round, where they must swim underwater to release ten buoys. The first man and the first woman to release ten buoys win immunity. This challenge was based on the first individual immunity challenge of Borneo.; At the immunity challenge, Amber and Kathy moved on to the final round, along with Lex and Rob. Amber struggled to unhook the seventh buoy, allowing Kathy to pull ahead and win immunity. Lex had a lead, however he struggled to unhook the final buoy, allowing Rob make a comeback and win immunity. When Chaboga Mogo returned to camp, Kathy and Lex were skeptical about Rob's deal. Lex felt that he had a made a potential game-ending blunder by sending Jerri home instead of Amber. Lex's worst fears were realized as Rob bluntly told Lex that the original Chaperas would be sticking together and that he was their target at Tribal Council. Kathy was also upset at Rob for going back on his word. Extremely angry, Lex yelled at Rob that he had compromised his numbers at the merge by honoring his word with Rob. Rob realized that had Jerri stayed and Amber gone, Tom may have possibly switched sides. Kathy felt that Lex didn't deserve to go and considered giving her immunity to Lex and sacrificing herself so that Lex would have another chance to take Rob out. In the end, Kathy kept her immunity necklace and Lex was voted out.
117	12	"A Thoughtful Gesture or a Deceptive Plan"	Recap	7.5/21	April 15, 2004	20.78
As Chaboga Mogo returned from Tribal Council, heavy rainfall had reduced their fire significantly. When the castaways gathered for a challenge, they were informed that it would be for reward and immunity. The castaways were given a taste of the videos from home.: Reward/Immunity Challenge: The castaways would compete in two teams of four to navigate through an obstacle course. The must fight through twigs, navigate a series of balance beams, and participate in a belly crawl. Then they must climb a 10-foot wall, build a bridge and cross it, use a rope ladder to climb to a tower and cross a rope bridge. One team member must wait while the rest descend a ladder and dig out a buried flag. Once the flag is dug up, the one left waiting must zip down a line to grab a key. They must use the key to unlock a gate, allowing the team members to pass through and cross the finish line. The first team to cross the finish line wins a reward of letters from home as well as rain parkas. Then the winning four must compete against each other for immunity. Each team member must complete a slide puzzle. The first castaway to slide out their knife and cut a rope to raise a flag wins immunity, plus a chance to watch a video from home while enjoying hot chocolate.; The teams for the challenge were Alicia, Amber, Rob, and Shii Ann versus Jenna, Kathy, Rupert, and Tom. Alicia's team took an early lead and won the reward. Rob quickly solved the puzzle to slide his knife out, and chopped the rope to raise his flag, winning immunity. Rob chose to forgo seeing his video so everybody could receive letters from home. After everyone finished reading their letters from home, Kathy attempted to break the Chapera alliance by telling Rupert and Tom that Amber, Jenna, and Rob wouldn't allow anyone else to reach the final three. In the end, Kathy's efforts to break the Chapera alliance were to no avail, and she was voted out, becoming the second member of the jury.
118	13	"Stupid People, Stupid, Stupid People"	Recap	7.6/22	April 22, 2004	20.99
As the castaways returned from Tribal Council, Shii Ann, the last ex-Mogo Mogo left in the game knew she was on the chopping block. She lobbied Rob to keep her in the game and failed.: Reward Challenge: At the challenge site, there were a set of masks for each castaway. Each castaway must fill out a questionnaire that asks personal information and private opinions on others. Then they must vote on what they think the most common answer would be. Each castaway who answers a question correctly would be allowed to cut a section of rope connected to the swinging log of the castaway they wanted eliminated. Three cuts of the rope would send the logs smashing into the mask. The last person left with their mask intact wins reward. All the castaways would go to a restaurant, with the winner choosing what each castaway would eat at the restaurant.; At the reward challenge, Rob was found to be the most trustworthy, and Shii Ann and Tom each took a hit. The castaways thought that Alicia and Shii Ann were the least deserving of being an All-Star, and Tom was out of the challenge. After Alicia, Jenna, and Shii Ann were eliminated, the castaways found out that Alicia was voted "most likely to be under the false assumption that she was smart", upsetting Alicia. When Rob was eliminated, it came down to Amber and Rupert. Both answered a question correctly, however Rupert was already ahead and won reward. After returning to camp, Alicia was upset at what she found out at the challenge. As the castaways arrived at the restaurant, Rupert chose a steak for himself (which came with an all you can drink bar), a cheeseburger for Rob, a hot dog for Jenna, a sandwich for Amber, a salad for Alicia, and potatoes for Tom, leaving Shii Ann with cold rice. During the dinner, Rupert got drunk and the other castaways were annoyed by Shii Ann's craving of Rupert's steak. After returning from the restaurant, Shii Ann attempted to form an alliance with Alicia and failed.: Immunity Challenge: Each castaway would stand on a post directly under a bucket of water connected to their wrists. When a castaway drops their hand, they get poured on and are eliminated from the challenge. The last dry castaway wins immunity. This challenge was based on one from Africa.; At the immunity challenge, Amber and Jenna fell out early, with Alicia and Tom following. Rob moved his arm to swat at an insect, and only Rupert and Shii Ann remained. After Rupert was eliminated, Shii Ann won immunity, forcing the ex-Chapera alliance to vote out one of their own. After the castaways returned to camp, the Chapera alliance knew they had to turn on one of their own. Rob began to worry that Amber may be playing him. However, Rob's fears proved untrue, as Alicia was voted out and became the third member of the jury.
119	14	"A Chapera Surprise"	Recap	7.5/21	April 29, 2004	20.78
As the castaways gathered for the reward challenge, they were excited to see their loved ones. Jeff surprised the castaways when he announced that the loved ones would participate in the challenge instead of the All-Stars.: Reward Challenge: The loved ones must eat types of indigenous foods from past seasons. Each round will feature a different food item, with the loved one that finishes last being eliminated from the challenge. The last loved one left wins a night with their loved one at the old Chapera camp. Challenge was based on one from Thailand.; Amber's mother was eliminated first, followed by Shii Ann's mother and Rupert's wife. Jenna's brother broke the rules by drinking water during a tarantula dish. It was down to Rob's brother and Tom's son. Tom's son quickly ate the final item, winning reward. Tom was offered the chance to invite one other castaway and their loved one to join them. He chose Rob and his brother to join him. When Rob and Tom arrived at the old Chapera camp with their loved ones, there were beer and pizza waiting for them. Rob and Tom both discussed their strategies privately to their loved one. When the four men returned to the Chaboga Mogo camp, the loved ones were put to work. Tom's son helped out, however he broke the tribe's fishing spear, which upset Rupert. Rob's brother wanted to relax.: Immunity Challenge: The goal of this challenge is to ignite the top of a "teeter-totter tower". East castaway must gather firewood and use matches to start a fire in one bucket. Then they must fill a bucket on the opposite side of the teeter-totter with water. To make things more difficult, the water bucket will have a hole in it. The first castaway to ignite their tower wins immunity. The challenge was based on one from The Australian Outback.; At the immunity challenge, it came down to Shii Ann and Tom. Tom's fire ignited the fuse first, securing him immunity. After returning the camp, Shii Ann attempted to break the Chapera alliance. She lobbied Amber, Rupert, and Tom to vote out Jenna, giving her some comfort. In the end, Shii Ann's lobbying proved ineffective, as she was voted out.
120	15	"The Instigator"	Recap	7.2/20	May 6, 2004	19.21
Jenna and Rupert discussed their alliance, and talked about voting out Rob. As they were strategizing, Rob appeared and got paranoid.: Reward Challenge: The castaways must cross a long balance beam, with the last to cross being eliminated from the challenge. The last four must then do a military crawl to a slide puzzle, with the last to finish the puzzle being eliminated from the challenge. The last three must then stomp an item from a balance beam into a raised bucket three times, with the last one to complete the round being eliminated. The last two must then climb a rope ladder to catch a flying fox. The first castaway to jump off the flying fox and grab a set of keys wins a brand new Chevrolet Colorado, as well as a trip to a drive-in to watch a screening of Lord of the Flies in their new truck.; The reward challenge came down to Amber and Rob, however Rob was faster in climbing the rope ladder to win the challenge. Rob had a chance to bring one other castaway with him on the reward. He chose Amber. As Amber and Rob arrived at the drive-in, Amber was excited to receive a reward of her own, a brand new Chevrolet Malibu. When Amber and Rob returned to camp, Rob's paranoia increased when he saw Rupert and Tom going to talk privately. Feeling vulnerable, Rob managed to turn Rupert and Tom against each other.: Immunity Challenge: The castaways must search through a bundle of letters for a list of all the past Survivor tribes. The seventeen tribe names will intersect and share letters. Once all the tribe names are found, the castaways must unscramble the intersecting letters to form a winning word. The first castaway to unscramble the winning word wins immunity.; At the immunity challenge, Rob figured out the final word, "Chaboga Mogo," before Amber, winning immunity. After the immunity challenge, the final five made sure their alliances were still intact. Amber got worried that Tom would join Jenna and Rupert to vote her off. Amber and Rob formed an alliance with Tom to vote out Jenna. In the end, Tom stayed true to his word and voted for Jenna, however Amber and Rob opted to take Jenna and Rupert to the final four, and Tom was voted out, becoming the fifth member of the jury.
121	16	"The Sole Surviving All-Star"	Recap	10.0/25	May 9, 2004	24.76
The final four were awakened by Jeff, who landed on their beach with a breakfast of eggs, bacon, mimosas, and pancakes. He also gave them a camera and a scrapbook. Amber and Jenna discussed Jenna's position in the game. She could vote for Amber or Rob – whichever one doesn't win immunity, causing a tie between one of them and Rupert, or she could vote with Amber and Rob to eliminate Rupert.: Immunity Challenge: The final four castaways must navigate through a maze and avoid several obstacles. At the end of each corridor would be a rung for a ladder. The castaways must collect eight rungs in order to climb up to a tower. The first castaway to assemble their ladder and climb to the top of their tower wins immunity. This challenge was based on one from The Amazon.; At the immunity challenge, Jenna fell behind early, while Rob got confused and fell behind later on. It was between Amber and Rupert. Amber climbed to the tower first, winning immunity. After the immunity challenge, Amber and Rob reminded Jenna none of the three would ever beat Rupert in a jury vote and that if she were to cut Rupert at the final three as opposed to now, she would also lose his vote, and that she was good in challenges and could get to the finals still by winning the final immunity challenge. Due to her fears of a potential rock draw tiebreaker, Jenna voted for Rupert, who became the sixth member of the jury. Jeff woke up the final three and gave them a map to follow. They first went to a decoration stand filled with jewelry and paint and decorated themselves to resemble Pearl Islands tribesmen. Their trek then continued with the traditional path of the fallen castaways' torches and led them to the final immunity challenge.: Immunity Challenge: The final three castaways must balance themselves barefoot on a post while holding onto an idol with one hand. Any castaway who moves either foot off the post or touched the idol with their free hand will be eliminated from the challenge. The last castaway left standing wins immunity. This challenge was based on the final immunity challenge of Borneo.; At the immunity challenge, Jenna was eliminated after two hours. After Jenna was eliminated, Amber tried to convince Rob to let her win immunity, however Rob wanted to finish the challenge fair and square. Amber accidentally touched the idol with her free hand, giving Rob immunity. Rob made it clear that he was voting out Jenna, however Amber was still slightly nervous despite feeling primarily confident. In the end, Rob kept his word and voted out Jenna, propelling him and Amber to the final two. On their final night, Amber and Rob prepared to meet the jury the next day. With the camp to themselves for the first time, Amber and Rob enjoyed romantic moments. At the final Tribal Council, Rob defended his actions as part of the game. Amber admitted that her position in the final two was partly due to luck and riding of Rob's coattails. The jurors made emotional statements, with many jurors angry at Rob for his deception.
122	17	"Reunion"	N/A	12.8/29	May 9, 2004	28.36
Months later, the votes were read to reveal the winner. But before the votes were read, Rob proposed marriage to Amber, and she accepted. Ultimately, the jury had voted Amber the Sole Survivor in a 4–3 vote; Amber received the votes of Lex, Alicia, Shii Ann, and Tom, while Rob got Kathy, Rupert, and Jenna's votes. The castaways then discussed the season with host Jeff Probst. Additionally, Amber—as the season's winner—was given the right to award a new car to one of the jurors; she chose Shii Ann. Jeff also revealed another $1 million prize, to be awarded to one of the 18 castaways by public vote, with the results to be announced four days later on Survivor: America's Tribal Council.

== Voting history ==
	Original tribes				Absorbed tribes				Switched tribes	Merged tribe						
Episode	1	2	3	4	5	6	7	8	10	11	12	13	14	15	16	
Day	3	6	9	12	15	17	19	21	24	27	28	30	33	36	37	38
Tribe	Saboga	Saboga	Mogo; Mogo	Chapera	Mogo; Mogo	Chapera	Mogo; Mogo	Mogo; Mogo	Chapera	Chaboga; Mogo	Chaboga; Mogo	Chaboga; Mogo	Chaboga; Mogo	Chaboga; Mogo	Chaboga; Mogo	Chaboga; Mogo
Eliminated	Tina	Rudy	Jenna M.	Rob C.	Richard	Sue	Colby	Ethan	Jerri	Lex	Kathy	Alicia	Shii Ann	Tom	Rupert	Jenna L.
Votes	4–2	3–2	Quit (Note: No vote; Jenna M. chose to quit the game.)	5–1	6–1	Quit (Note: No vote; Sue chose to quit the game.)	3–2	4–1	4–1	7–2	6–2	6–1	5–1	4–1	3–1	1–0
Voter	Votes															
Amber				Rob C.					Jerri	Lex	Kathy	Alicia	Shii Ann	Tom	Rupert	None (Note: Amber and Jenna L. were not eligible to vote as the only eligible players they could vote for were each other.)
Rob M.				Rob C.						Lex	Kathy	Alicia	Shii Ann	Tom	Rupert	Jenna L.
Jenna L.	Tina	Rudy								Lex	Kathy	Alicia	Shii Ann	Tom	Rupert	None
Rupert	Tina	Ethan								Lex	Kathy	Alicia	Shii Ann	Tom	Rob M.	
Tom				Rob C.						Lex	Kathy	Alicia	Shii Ann	Jenna L.		
Shii Ann					Richard		Colby	Ethan	Jerri	Lex	Amber	Alicia	Amber			
Alicia				Rob C.						Lex	Kathy	Rupert				
Kathy					Richard		Kidnapped (Note: Kathy was "kidnapped" by the opposing tribe, granting her exemption from her tribe's Tribal Council.)	Ethan	Jerri	Amber	Amber					
Lex					Richard		Colby	Ethan	Jerri	Amber						
Jerri	Tina	Rudy			Richard		Colby	Ethan	Amber							
Ethan	Jenna L.	Rudy			Richard		Jerri	Jerri								
Colby					Richard		Jerri									
Sue				Rob C.		Quit										
Richard					Colby											
Rob C.				Alicia												
Jenna M.			Quit													
Rudy	Tina	Ethan														
Tina	Jenna L.															

Jury vote
Episode	17	
Day	39	
Finalist	Amber	Rob M.
Vote	4–3	
Juror	Votes	
Jenna L.		Yes
Rupert		Yes
Tom	Yes	
Shii Ann	Yes	
Alicia	Yes	
Kathy		Yes
Lex	Yes	

== America's Tribal Council ==
Survivor: America's Tribal Council is a special episode that was broadcast live on CBS on May 13, 2004, four days after the All-Stars finale. The special was announced at the All-Stars finale in lieu of the typical announcement of the upcoming Survivor season, and revealed in tandem with an additional million-dollar prize awarded to the All-Stars contestant who received the most votes from the public, which was awarded at the end of the special. Throughout the special, Rupert Boneham, Tom Buchanan, Colby Donaldson, and Rob Mariano were revealed to be the top four vote-getters, with Boneham ultimately being revealed as the winner with roughly 85% of the approximately 38 million votes cast. In addition to the million dollar prize, viewers voted on several other awards, the results of which were also revealed throughout the special.

- Sexiest Male

- Greg Buis (Borneo)
- Gervase Peterson (Borneo)
- Colby Donaldson (Australian Outback)
- Ethan Zohn (Africa)
- Hunter Ellis (Marquesas)
- Rob Mariano (Marquesas)
- Robb Zbacnik (Thailand)
- Alex Bell (Amazon)
- Burton Roberts (Pearl Islands)
- Andrew Savage (Pearl Islands)

- Sexiest Female

- Colleen Haskell (Borneo)
- Amber Brkich (Australian Outback)
- Alicia Calaway (Australian Outback)
- Elisabeth Filarski (Australian Outback)
- Jerri Manthey (Australian Outback)
- Sarah Jones (Marquesas)
- Erin Collins (Thailand)
- Jenna Morasca (Amazon)
- Heidi Strobel (Amazon)
- Darrah Johnson (Pearl Islands)

- Best Villain

- Richard Hatch (Borneo)
- Jerri Manthey (Australian Outback)
- Brian Heidik (Thailand)
- Rob Cesternino (Amazon)
- Jonny Fairplay (Pearl Islands)

- Best Fight

- Alicia Calaway vs. Kimmi Kappenberg (Australian Outback)
- Ghandia Johnson vs. Ted Rogers, Jr. (Thailand)
- Clay Jordan vs. Robb Zbacnik (Thailand)
- Rupert Boneham vs. Jonny Fairplay (Pearl Islands)
- Rob Mariano vs. Lex van den Berghe (All-Stars)

- Most Memorable Moment

- Sue Hawk (Borneo) – Compared finalists Richard Hatch and Kelly Wiglesworth to a snake and a rat, respectively, during her jury speech
- Michael Skupin (Australian Outback) – Was removed from the game after passing out and falling into a fire
- Jenna Morasca and Heidi Strobel (Amazon) – Took off their clothes for chocolate and peanut butter during an immunity challenge
- Rupert Boneham (Pearl Islands) – Stole then sold shoes belonging to the opposing tribe
- Jonny Fairplay (Pearl Islands) – Plotted with his loved one to claim that his grandmother died to gain fellow castaways' sympathy

== Production ==
=== Casting ===
Producer Mark Burnett stated that, "the casting was really, really scientific. I got a yellow legal pad and wrote down 24 names, and [then] cut down to 18. It was that quick." He confirmed that two former contestants turned down formal offers: Elisabeth Filarski Hasselbeck from The Australian Outback, who had recently taken a job as a co-host of The View, and Colleen Haskell of the show's premiere season, who "had moved on with her life" and "just genuinely didn't want to go through that again." Jenna Lewis and Amber Brkich were chosen to replace the two.

Other contestants who were considered, but ultimately cut included Kelly Goldsmith and Teresa Cooper from Africa, Neleh Dennis and Sean Rector from Marquesas, and Clay Jordan and Helen Glover from Thailand. Sandra Diaz-Twine, winner of Pearl Islands was asked to participate in the season, but declined due to parasites she had contracted in the Pearl Islands. She would eventually return to Survivor for Heroes vs. Villains (for which she also won), Game Changers, Winners at War and the Australian Survivor: Blood V Water. Heidi Strobel from The Amazon was also offered a spot on All-Stars, but she turned down the offer.

== Reception ==
The season has received mixed reviews from fans and critics with many criticizing the boot order of the cast as many of the memorable players were voted out before the jury phase of the game. The Sue Hawk and Richard Hatch incident also soured fans of the show with many calling it "uncomfortable." Michael Favaro of Surviving Tribal called this season underwhelming and the "most painful to watch out of the (then) four all returnee seasons." Dalton Ross of Entertainment Weekly ranked this season 26th out of 40 calling it "a bit of a letdown." In 2015, a poll by Rob Has a Podcast ranked this season 16th out of 30 with Rob Cesternino ranking this season 17th. This was updated in 2021 during Cesternino's podcast, Survivor All-Time Top 40 Rankings, ranking 24th out of 40. In 2020, Survivor fan site "Purple Rock Podcast" ranked this season 25th out of 40 saying that the season "features one of the most uncomfortable incidents in the show’s history, and it is not handled well. But despite that, there is some decent gameplay here- just be prepared for a very angry final tribal council." Later that same year, Inside Survivor ranked this season 29th out of 40 calling it "an uncomfortable season to sit through, but it does have an epic feel, especially across the first three or four episodes." In 2021, Kristen Kranz of Collider ranked All-Stars as the 9th best season of the series and praised the unexpected romance between Brkich and Mariano which, "sort of set the stage for cementing flirting as a game strategy, one that countless other players will utilize in all seasons to come." In 2022, Entertainment Weekly ranked Brkich and Mariano's romance 49th in its list of The 100 Best TV Romances of All Time. In 2024, Nick Caruso of TVLine ranked this season 35th out of 47.
