= Sandra Diaz-Twine =

American TV personality (born 1974)

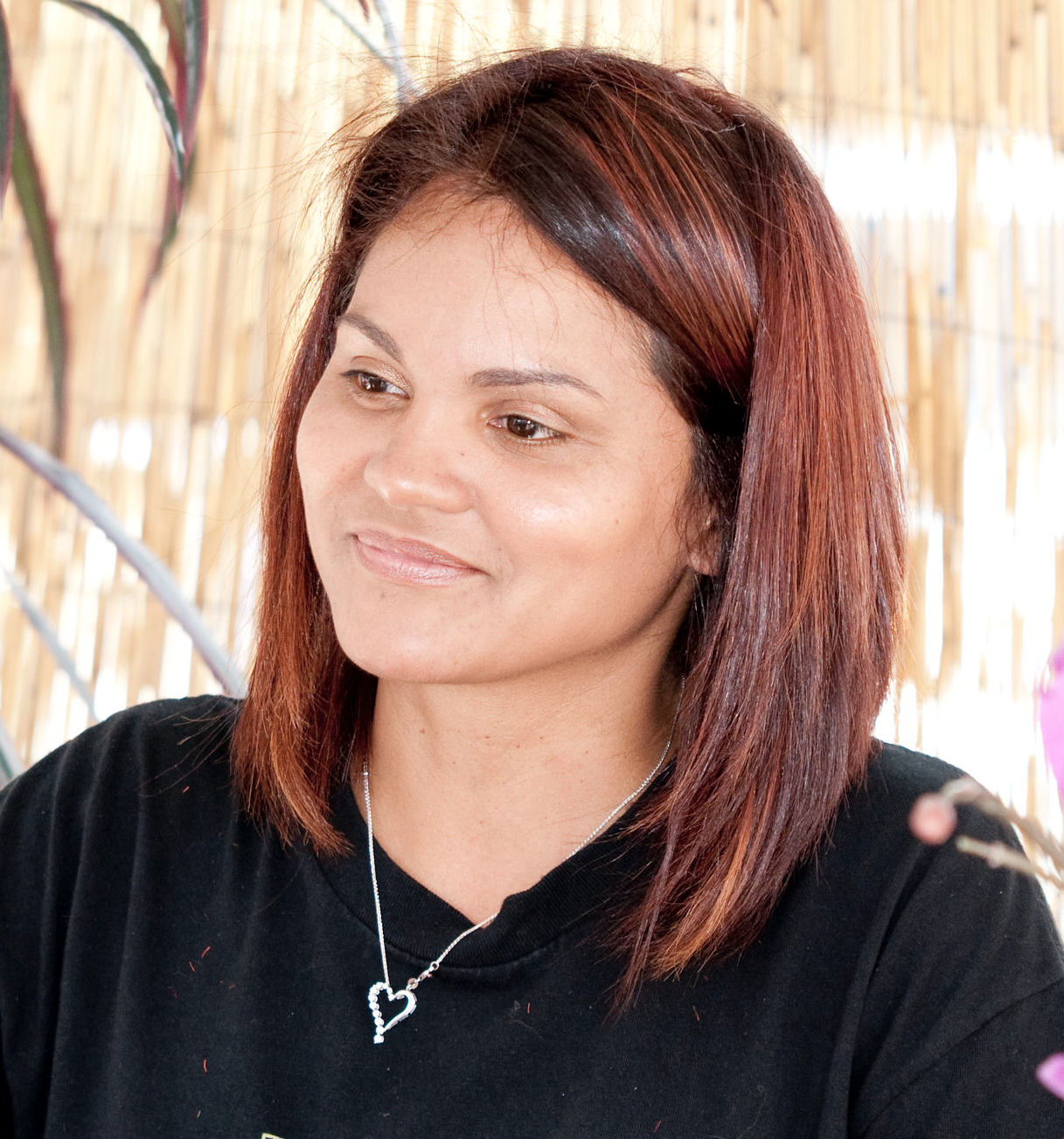
- Diaz-Twine in 2010
- Born: Sandra Diaz; July 30, 1974 (age 52); Stamford, Connecticut, U.S.
- Television: Survivor: Pearl Islands (Winner); Survivor: Heroes vs. Villains (Winner); Survivor: Game Changers (15th); Survivor: Island of the Idols (Mentor); Survivor: Winners at War (16th); Australian Survivor: Blood V Water (19th); The Traitors season 2; 99 to Beat; Extracted season 2
- Spouse: Marcus Twine (m. 1994)
- Children: 2

Sandra Diaz-Twine (born July 30, 1974) is an American television personality who became known for her appearances on the reality game show Survivor. She won the first two seasons she appeared on, Survivor: Pearl Islands and Survivor: Heroes vs. Villains, making her the show's first two-time winner. She returned for Survivor's 34th season, Survivor: Game Changers, where she was the 6th person voted out. Along with fellow Survivor contestant Rob Mariano, she was a non-competing mentor on the show's 39th season Survivor: Island of the Idols, and subsequently competed on the show's 40th season, Survivor: Winners at War, where she was the 7th person voted out and only player to leave the game at the Edge of Extinction. She also competed for a fifth time on Survivor on the Blood V Water edition of the Australian Survivor with her daughter Nina, which aired in 2022.

Diaz-Twine is regarded among fans as one of the greatest players on the show.

== Personal life ==
Diaz-Twine was born in Stamford, Connecticut and for a time served in the United States Army as a chemical repair specialist and later an office administrator. She lives in Fayetteville, North Carolina with her husband Marcus, a career soldier, and her two children, while working as a secretary for a law firm. On the February 12, 2026, episode of the Rob Has a Podcast podcast hosted by fellow Survivor player Rob Cesternino, she mentioned that she and her husband are retired.

== Survivor ==
=== Pearl Islands ===
Diaz-Twine seemed like an early target for her lack of physical strength and inability to swim, but her knowledge of the Spanish language and her resourcefulness, which helped their tribe Drake gather much needed resources from local traders at the start of the game, put her in good standing with the majority of her tribe. She eventually formed an alliance with Rupert Boneham, Christa Hastie, Trish Dunn, and Jonny Fairplay. Diaz-Twine was the first person to sit out of a challenge and the first to raid on Morgan's camp as part of the reward, where she not only took their tarp, but sabotaged their shelter. When Drake lost the fourth and fifth immunity challenges, the alliance voted out the minority alliance's Burton Roberts and Michelle Tesauro. When Drake lost the sixth immunity challenge, the originally-targeted Shawn Cohen was saved when Diaz-Twine turned the alliance against Dunn for instigating an attempted blindside of Boneham.

With the Drake and Morgan tribes even at five members each, they were shocked when the six contestants who had been previously voted out came back into the game as a third tribe, in a turn of events called the "Outcast Twist." When the tribe of Outcasts competed against the Drake and Morgan tribes and subsequently won the immunity challenge, two of the Outcasts were allowed to return to the game. At the same time, both Drake and Morgan were forced to vote out a tribe member. In a game-changing move, Diaz-Twine, Boneham, and Hastie, unsure about whether to send home Cohen, the last minority alliance member left, or Fairplay, who betrayed them previously together with Dunn, asked them to publicly campaign for their spot. The alliance eventually eliminated Cohen, and received Roberts as a replacement from The Outcasts.

As the tribes merged into Balboa at 5–5, the Drake tribe, with the help of outcast Roberts, was able to sway Morgan outcast Lillian "Lil" Morris to vote with them, controlling the game and subsequently voting out Morgan leaders Andrew Savage and Ryan Opray. However, the game took a major shift when old Drake members Fairplay and Roberts aligned themselves with Morris, and recruited the remaining Morgan members Tijuana "Ti" Bradley and Darrah Johnson. This new alliance successfully targeted Boneham and he was blindsided.

At the Final Seven, it seemed that Diaz-Twine and Hastie were doomed by this newly created alliance, but Diaz-Twine swayed Bradley and Johnson by spying on Roberts and Fairplay to expose their intentions to eliminate the Morgan girls after getting rid of Diaz-Twine and Hastie. However, when Roberts and Fairplay learned of this impending mutiny, they regained the trust of Diaz-Twine and Hastie (with the help of Fairplay’s infamous "dead grandmother" lie) to successfully blindside Bradley. Soon after that, they were betrayed once again when Roberts and Dalton switched sides and Hastie was voted out next.

At the Final Five, Johnson was the next target of Roberts and Fairplay, but Morris started to have suspicions about her alliance (which would prove true eventually). Roberts made a potentially fatal error by inviting Dalton on his reward trip, leaving the three women, including an angered Morris, together back at camp, sparking a last minute scramble to break the bond between the two guys, eventually voting out Roberts for the second time in the game.

After Diaz-Twine made it to the Final Four, she was no longer a target, with Morris and Johnson targeting each other, each believing that no one could win against her in the Final Two. Diaz-Twine and Fairplay decided to side with Morris and vote out Johnson, propelling them into the Final Three. In the Final Three endurance immunity challenge, Morris won and chose to eliminate Fairplay, an error that led to Diaz-Twine's ultimate win.

In the end, after having previously stated that no one could ever win against Morris because she was too nice, Diaz-Twine defeated Morris, winning by a vote of 6–1 to become the Sole Survivor. During her final statements at Tribal Council, Diaz-Twine described her strategy as being the one people would come to if they needed one more vote to oust someone ("anyone, as long as it ain't me"). She gained the votes of Opray, Boneham, Hastie, Roberts, Johnson, and Fairplay. Only Bradley voted for Morris.

=== Heroes vs. Villains ===
After declining a spot on Survivor: All-Stars due to recovering from parasites that she got while being filmed for Pearl Islands, and then being cut at the last minute from Survivor: Micronesia, Diaz-Twine accepted a spot on Survivor: Heroes vs. Villains. She was one of four previous winners chosen; the other three were Tom Westman of Survivor: Palau, Parvati Shallow of Survivor: Micronesia, and James "J.T." Thomas, Jr. of Survivor: Tocantins. At the start, Diaz-Twine was placed on the Villains tribe, and in the first episode, when host Jeff Probst asked who believed they were on the wrong tribe, she was quick to raise her hand. During the first reward challenge, she deliberately tore Hero Jessica "Sugar" Kiper's top off, which, according to Heroes member Cirie Fields, solidified why Diaz-Twine was chosen as a Villain.

In Episode Three, when the Villains faced their first Tribal Council, Diaz-Twine stuck with her strategy from Pearl Islands of "anyone, as long as it ain't me." She, along with the rest of the Villains tribe, unanimously voted out Randy Bailey from Survivor: Gabon. Despite previously appearing to be in a comfortable six-person alliance, by Episode Eight, she found herself on the outs of her tribe alongside Courtney Yates of Survivor: China. Despite the pair being considered the weakest on the tribe, Diaz-Twine convinced Russell Hantz that Benjamin "Coach" Wade was against him, and she and Yates survived elimination at Tribal Council. Yates, however, would be voted off in the subsequent Tribal Council.

After the merge, Diaz-Twine pleaded with the Heroes not to trust Hantz. However, they did not listen, and despite several attempts to oust him, she remained with the Villains after her plans to help the Heroes failed to materialize. She made it to the Final Three, along with Shallow and Hantz. On May 16, 2010, Diaz-Twine received six jury votes from Yates, Heroes tribe members Thomas, Amanda Kimmel, Candice Woodcock, Boneham and Colby Donaldson to Shallow's three and Hantz's zero to win the game. She became the first contestant to win Survivor twice and proclaimed herself the "Queen of Survivor."

=== Game Changers ===
Diaz-Twine entered Survivor: Game Changers as one of three former winners. She had an especially big target on her back since she had won twice before. She was initially assigned to the Mana tribe. After losing the first Immunity Challenge, Mana made an easy vote and decided to unanimously vote off Ciera Eastin for playing too hard too early.

The day after Eastin's elimination, Diaz-Twine made an alliance with Survivor: Cagayan winner Tony Vlachos on the basis that they were both major threats. The duo planned to link up with J.T. Thomas, the other past winner in the game, should they ever meet on the same tribe. She and Vlachos pulled in Aubry Bracco, Caleb Reynolds, and Malcolm Freberg, and thus the alliance of five seemed to control the nine-person Mana tribe. However, on night five, Vlachos caught Diaz-Twine talking with "Troyzan" Robertson in the middle of the night. Even though she had not reneged on the alliance, Vlachos misinterpreted the conversation and confronted her. As a result, Diaz-Twine and Vlachos turned against each other—he for seeing her as too much of a threat; she because Vlachos was too controlling. Mana narrowly lost the second challenge and went back to Tribal Council. Diaz-Twine gathered her troops; she spoke to those who were on the outs of the alliance of big threats, namely Hali Ford, Jeff Varner, Michaela Bradshaw, and Robertson. She wanted them to vote with her to take out Vlachos. At Tribal Council, Diaz-Twine voted against Bracco in the event that Vlachos played an idol. The rest of the tribe voted with her and sent Vlachos packing. As Vlachos left, Diaz-Twine coined the catch phrase she uttered at all subsequent councils until she was voted out: “And the Queen stays Queen”.

Day Seven brought a tribe swap, and Diaz-Twine was sent to the Nuku tribe. The former Manas had a 5–1 majority on the new Nuku, with Thomas being the odd man out. Nuku won the third Immunity Challenge, and later the first Reward Challenge, winning coffee, cookies, and pastries. During this time, Thomas was plotting behind Diaz-Twine's back to take her out of the competition.

At the Day 11 Immunity Challenge, Jeff Probst revealed that the two tribes who lost the Immunity Challenge would be sent to one Tribal Council, where they would collectively vote out one person. Nuku had an early lead due to Varner's proficient communication skills, but he ultimately lost the challenge at the table maze stage. Nuku was set to head to Tribal Council with Mana. During the afternoon, Thomas continued plotting against Diaz-Twine, mainly with his new ally Freberg. However, the rest of the tribe planned to vote together. They planned to vote against Sierra Dawn Thomas (no relation to J.T.). At a chaotic Tribal Council, J.T. had told Mana that Sierra was Nuku's target, and hoped to get the Mana tribe to blindside Diaz-Twine. In the end, Nuku continued with their original plan, piling their votes onto Sierra. Tai Trang played his hidden immunity idol on Sierra, negating the six votes cast against her. Freberg was taken out, much to the chagrin of the Nuku tribe.

Freberg's untimely blindside infuriated Diaz-Twine, who, after Tribal Council, confronted J.T. She planned to get him out for his "dirty deed" should Nuku lose the next Immunity Challenge. At the second Reward Challenge, she helped Nuku win peanut butter and jelly sandwiches by completing the puzzle. After the challenge, she played on the brewing feud between J.T. and Bradshaw. She escalated the tension by consuming the tribe's sugar and putting the blame on Bradshaw. Nuku went on to lose the Immunity Challenge, sending Diaz-Twine to Tribal Council for the fourth time. She seized the opportunity to exact revenge on J.T. At Tribal Council, J.T. and Bradshaw's fight reached a fever pitch. Diaz-Twine took advantage of this to secure Bradshaw's vote. She pulled the wool over Bracco's and J.T.’s eyes, and with Varner's vote, J.T. was sent home with an idol in his pocket. After Tribal Council, Diaz-Twine made clear that Bracco was next on her list, since she had failed to get with the rest of the Manas during her time in the game.

A second tribe swap occurred on Day 14, but although Diaz-Twine remained on Nuku, she was relegated to the bottom with Varner, as the original Nukus who returned to the tribe held a five-to-two numbers advantage. The Nukus planned to get her out for being a two-time winner. Her fate was sealed when Nuku lost the Immunity Challenge. However, she saw through the Nukus' lie that she was safe over Trang, and she tried to gather votes by telling Ozzy Lusth, Sarah Lacina, and Andrea Boehlke that she would vote with them when the merge hit. Diaz-Twine planned to throw Trang under the bus at Tribal Council. But during Tribal Council, Trang whispered to her, telling her to vote against Lusth. She made a last-ditch attempt to gather votes against either Lusth or Trang (for his perceived duplicity), but it was all for naught. Diaz-Twine left the game in 15th place to an ovation, in a 5–2 vote. However, she emerged as the highest-placing former winner in the season.

=== Island of the Idols ===
Diaz-Twine, along with Rob Mariano, participated in the show's 39th season which aired in late 2019. Neither participated in any direct aspect of the game, but instead, they served as mentors to any player sent to the island, offering advice on various topics deemed valuable attributes of a Survivor player. Both players stayed on the island until the Final 5, after which the players were left to play the game by themselves.

=== Winners at War ===
Diaz-Twine played the game for a fourth time on the show's 40th season, Survivor: Winners at War. She was a member of the Dakal tribe. After sixteen days of riding a comfortable majority, she became the seventh person voted out of the game (again on Day 16) after Denise Stapley played two idols, blocking votes for herself and Jeremy Collins, thereby casting the sole vote that sent Diaz-Twine to the Edge of Extinction. After she was voted off, Sandra joined the previously eliminated players on the Edge of Extinction. As she explained to the other players and in confessions to the camera, she knew she had little chance to win any physical challenge and did not want to face the misery and harsh conditions on the Edge of Extinction. As a result, she decided to raise the flag and permanently leave the game shortly after her arrival, the only player in the season to do so, and forfeiting her opportunity to be on the jury.

=== Australian Survivor: Blood V Water ===
Diaz-Twine played for a fifth time on the ninth season of Australian Survivor, titled Australian Survivor: Blood V Water, alongside her daughter Nina. Diaz-Twine became the second former American Survivor contestant to compete on Australian Survivor after Russell Hantz, as well as being the second contestant after Rob Mariano to play the game for a fifth time. She was eliminated after a tribe swap, and yet again on the 16th day of the competition.

== Other media appearances ==
In 2013, Diaz-Twine was in the audience of an episode of Dr. Phil to support her friend and fellow Survivor winner, Todd Herzog, who was struggling with alcoholism.

In May 2022, Diaz-Twine competed as a celebrity tribe captain in the first season of the NMB Celebrity Survivor Challenge. She was the 9th person voted out and became the fifth member of the jury.

Diaz-Twine competed in the second season (2024) of The Traitors alongside fellow Survivor alumna Parvati Shallow. She was given the role of a faithful and placed fifth, being the last player banished before the endgame.

In September 2025, Diaz-Twine competed on the first season of the Fox game show 99 to Beat. She was eliminated in the first episode after her team finished last in the "Bucket Head Relay" game.

In January 2026, Diaz-Twine competed alongside her daughter Nina Twine in the second season of Extracted.

== Filmography ==
=== Television ===
Year	Title	Role	Notes
2003	Survivor: Pearl Islands	Contestant	Winner, Day 39
2010	Survivor: Heroes vs. Villains	Contestant	Winner, Day 39
2013	Dr. Phil	Guest	1 episode
2017	Survivor: Game Changers	Contestant	Eliminated; 15th place, Day 16
2019	Survivor: Island of the Idols	Mentor	13 episodes
2020	Survivor: Winners at War	Contestant	Eliminated; 16th place, Day 16
2022	Australian Survivor: Blood V Water	Contestant	Eliminated; 19th place, Day 16
2022	NMB Celebrity Survivor Challenge	Celebrity Tribe Captain/Contestant	Eliminated; 6th place - Season 1
2023	NMB Celebrity Survivor Challenge	Guest Co-Host	Season 2
2024	The Traitors	Contestant - Faithful	Banished; 5th place
2025	99 to Beat	Contestant	Eliminated; 87th place
2026	Extracted	Competitor	4 episodes

Preceded by Jenna Morasca	Winner of Survivor; Survivor: Pearl Islands	Succeeded by Amber Brkich
Preceded by Natalie White	Winner of Survivor; Survivor: Heroes vs. Villains	Succeeded by Jud "Fabio" Birza
