= Rupert Boneham =

American mentor, television personality, and politician

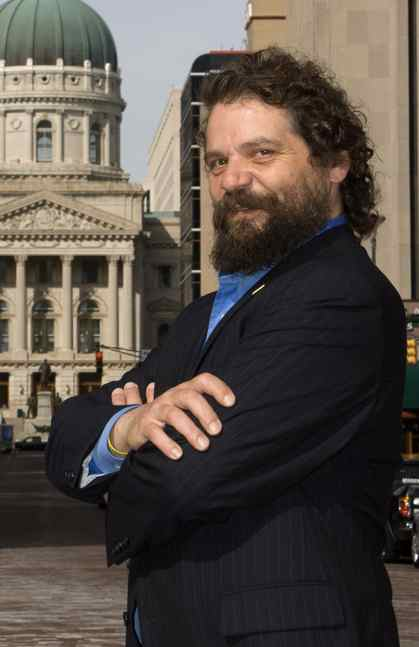
- Boneham during his 2012 campaign
- Born: Rupert Frederick Boneham; January 27, 1964 (age 62); Detroit, Michigan, U.S.
- Education: Cisco Junior College, Angelo State University
- Occupations: Reality television personality; Troubled-youth mentor
- Television: Survivor: Pearl Islands; Survivor: All-Stars; Survivor: Heroes vs. Villains; Survivor: Blood vs. Water; The Amazing Race 31
- Height: 5 ft 11 in (1.80 m)
- Political party: Libertarian
- Spouse: Laura Boneham
- Children: 1

Rupert Frederick Boneham (/ˈboʊnəm/ BOH-nəm; born January 27, 1964) is an American mentor for troubled teens who became known to reality television audiences in 2003 as a contestant on Survivor: Pearl Islands, where he placed eighth. He later appeared on the All-Stars, Heroes vs. Villains, and Blood vs. Water seasons of Survivor, placing fourth, sixth, and 20th, respectively. He was ultimately a fan favorite among Survivor viewers, who voted him a million-dollar winner on Survivor: America's Tribal Council, a special episode of Survivor: All-Stars. The prize was awarded after a nationwide popular vote in which Boneham received 85% of the votes cast. Boneham and his wife Laura later competed on the 31st season of The Amazing Race and were the second team eliminated.

Boneham was the Libertarian nominee for the 2012 Indiana gubernatorial election, losing to Republican nominee, and future Vice President of the United States, Mike Pence.

== Survivor ==
=== Pearl Islands ===
During Survivor: Pearl Islands, Boneham quickly became one of the most popular Survivor contestants, and was well known as a "gentle giant" for his distinctive appearance, which included a huge beard, tie-dye shirt and large size, as well as a boisterous, friendly-but-focused personality.

Boneham was a preselected member of the Drake tribe, before his arrival on the island for Survivor: Pearl Islands. For the first three episodes he was part of an alliance with Sandra Diaz-Twine, Christa Hastie, and Trish Dunn. In episode four, Boneham's tribe lost immunity, but he was kidnapped by the Morgan tribe and did not attend Tribal Council. He temporarily looked after a wounded python he found named Balboa, who became the namesake of the merged tribe. In Episode Six, Drake lost their third immunity challenge, and Dunn conspired with Diaz-Twine, "Jonny Fairplay" Dalton, and Shawn Cohen to vote out Boneham, but he was saved by Diaz-Twine and Cohen, sending Dunn home instead. After the next Tribal Council when Cohen was voted out, Burton Roberts from Drake and Lillian "Lil" Morris from Morgan returned to the game, as part of the Outcast twist, and both joined the Drake alliance at the merge. After two Morgan members had been eliminated, Dalton, Roberts and Morris sided with Darrah Johnson and Tijuana "Ti" Bradley from the Morgan tribe and successfully voted Boneham out on Day 27, in a vote of 5–2–1. That night he became the tenth contestant voted out of the competition (eleventh overall) and the second member of the jury. On Day 39, Boneham cast his jury vote for Diaz-Twine, who would be named the winner of the season.

=== All-Stars ===
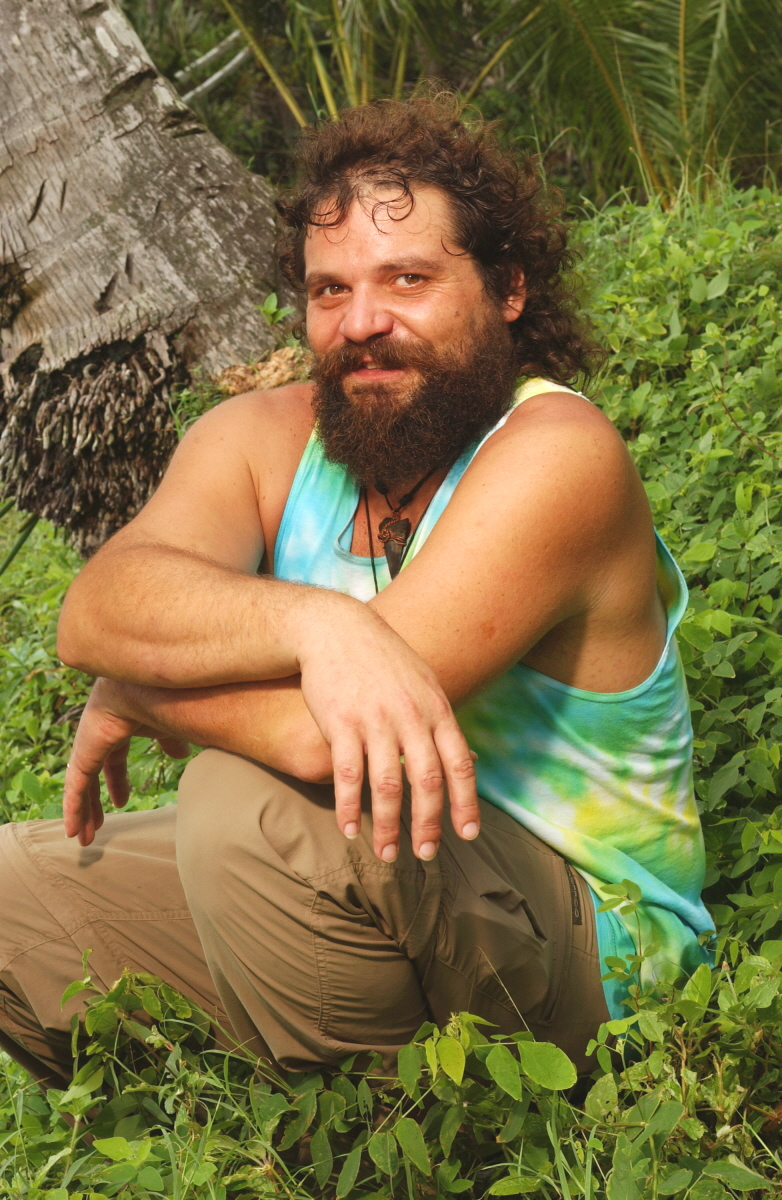
Boneham in 2004 Survivor: All-Stars

Less than a month after Boneham returned home from the competition, he returned to compete in the All-Stars season, the only player from Pearl Islands to do so, and thus the first contestant in Survivor history to compete in two consecutive seasons. Boneham went on to finish fourth, being voted out in Episode 15 and being the fifteenth person eliminated. After All-Stars ended a special aired called Survivor: America's Tribal Council, in which viewers were given the opportunity in a contest called "America Votes" to select one of the 18 contestants to win one million dollars. The finalists were Boneham, Colby Donaldson, "Big Tom" Buchanan, and "Boston Rob" Mariano. Boneham won the million dollars, receiving 85% of the 38 million votes cast. He spent his prize money on his family's debts, a college fund for his daughter, a new house for his family, and the creation of his charity, Rupert's Kids, which mentors troubled children.

After All-Stars ended, he appeared in national promos for Survivor: Vanuatu. Boneham also made an appearance in the third season of the Israeli version of Survivor in September 2009 as a part of a reward in a reward challenge.

=== Heroes vs. Villains ===
Boneham returned to participate in the Survivor: Heroes vs. Villains as part of the Heroes tribe. He was a part of the Heroes alliance which consisted of himself, J. T. Thomas, Amanda Kimmel, Cirie Fields, James Clement and Candice Woodcock. The alliance successfully eliminated Stephenie LaGrossa and Tom Westman, however, Fields was blindsided on Day 11, and they voted Clement out on Day 15 because his knee was injured. After Clement's elimination, the Heroes were down to five members, however, they won the last three immunity challenges.

The tribes merged with ten players remaining: five Heroes and five Villains. The Heroes thought that Villain member Russell Hantz was on their side. However, Sandra Diaz-Twine warned Boneham that Hantz was not with them, which concerned Boneham. At Tribal Council, the Heroes voted against Villains member Jerri Manthey while the Villains voted against Thomas, However, Parvati Shallow used one of her hidden immunity idols on Diaz-Twine, and used another idol (originally Thomas's immunity idol, which he gave to Hantz right before the merge, and which Hantz eventually gave to Shallow) on Manthey, whose votes were negated by the idol, therefore blindsiding Thomas and putting the Heroes in the minority. Woodcock flipped to the Villains alliance at the next Tribal Council so Kimmel was voted out. After Shallow won the next immunity challenge, Boneham put a rock in his pocket which made Hantz believe it was a hidden immunity idol. So the Villains decided to split their votes between Boneham and Woodcock. Due to Boneham and Colby Donaldson voting against Woodcock, she was blindsided thus sparing Boneham. He was spared again at the Final Seven Tribal Council, due to Hantz and Manthey siding with him to get rid of Danielle DiLorenzo.

After the loved ones challenge, Hantz plotted with Boneham and Donaldson to get rid of Shallow and they agreed. This plan was foiled when Shallow won immunity which surprised all three. At Tribal Council, Boneham and Donaldson voted for Diaz-Twine, but she used her hidden immunity idol, however, it only negated Boneham and Donaldson's votes as they were the only one's who voted against her. The four villains voted for Boneham thus eliminating him from the game. He was once again the fifteenth person eliminated, came in sixth place and was the seventh member of the jury. At the Final Tribal Council, Boneham, along with Courtney Yates and fellow Heroes tribemates Thomas, Kimmel, Woodcock, and Donaldson, voted for Diaz-Twine to win again, which she did by a 6–3–0 vote over Shallow and Hantz. At the reunion show, Boneham narrowly lost the fan favorite award to Hantz.

=== Blood vs. Water ===
Boneham and his wife Laura competed in the show's 27th season, Blood vs. Water. This made him the second contestant in the history of the program to play the game four times, following Rob Mariano. On Day One, Laura was the first member of the Tadhana tribe to be voted out. However, Rupert traded places with her and sent himself to Redemption Island in her place in order to give Laura a chance at playing the game. This sacrifice allowed Laura to play the game on the Galang tribe. Rupert ultimately lost the first duel at Redemption on day four, and became the first person eliminated from Survivor: Blood vs. Water, finishing in 20th place.

== Other appearances ==
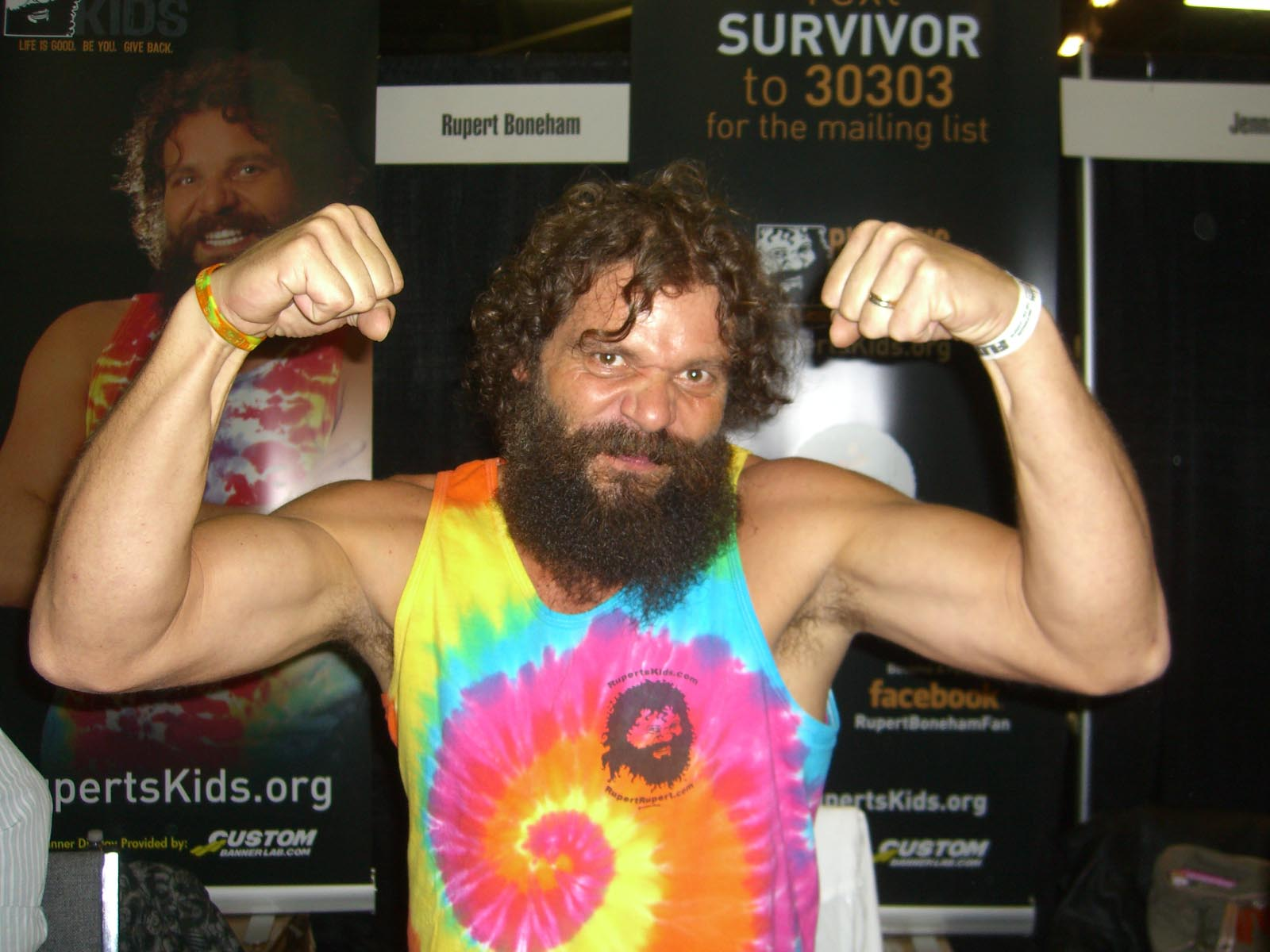
Boneham at the Big Apple Convention in Manhattan on October 17, 2009

Shortly after his Survivor appearances, Boneham briefly appeared at charity events sponsored by the Indiana Ice and Hardee's. In 2004, he appeared as a stable hand named Paul in "The Big My Little Pony Episode", the third-season premiere of the TV series Half & Half. In 2006, he appeared in the independent movie Open Mic'rs. He also made a cameo appearance as a homeless man in "The Radford Reshuffle", the sixth-season premiere of the show Yes, Dear. Boneham also makes an appearance as an extra in the bar fight scene in A Million Ways to Die in the West.

In 2016, Boneham appeared in a special episode of The Price Is Right which featured multiple former Survivor contestants competing on the show. The episode aired on May 23, 2016.

Boneham and his wife Laura competed on the 31st season of The Amazing Race. They were the second team eliminated.

== Rupert's Kids ==
In 1983, before appearing on Survivor, Boneham worked with mentally handicapped children in Abilene, Texas. He then moved to Indiana to work with troubled young adults. In 1991, he purchased an abandoned house and converted it into a vocational training center for young adults who had been expelled from school.

After being awarded one million dollars on Survivor: America's Tribal Council, Boneham used a large percentage of his winnings to establish Rupert's Kids, to help "at-risk teens". The organization joined with the City of Indianapolis to create the Park Adoption Program.

== 2012 gubernatorial campaign ==
On August 30, 2011, Boneham announced that he would consider running for governor of Indiana. He launched his campaign on October 22, declaring that he would seek the nomination of the Libertarian Party. He won their nomination and ran against Republican nominee Mike Pence and Democratic nominee John R. Gregg. Incumbent Republican governor Mitch Daniels was term-limited.

Boneham wrote on his official website, "I have spent my entire adult life serving my community and I see an opportunity to make a difference for Indiana", referencing his troubled-youth charity, Rupert's Kids.

While surveying the current choices for our next Governor, I do not see anyone that has an understanding of what daily life is like for many Hoosiers nor anyone who appears to understand the harm that misguided government policies are doing to our communities. It is obvious that career politicians are not the answer because they are often the problem. I will be evaluating whether or not hardworking Hoosiers are ready for a new voice with new ideas.

He states that he has been a Libertarian for more than 20 years, but did not become active in the party until 2012.

Boneham and running mate Brad Klopfenstein received 101,868 votes, 3.95 percent of the total.

== Personal life ==
As of The Amazing Race 31 in 2019, Rupert and Laura have been married for about 21 years, and have a daughter, Raya.

In 2021, Rupert revealed that he had undergone two surgeries for throat cancer.

== Filmography ==
=== Television ===
Year	Title	Role	Notes
2003	Survivor: Pearl Islands	Contestant	Eliminated; 8th place
2004	Survivor: All-Stars	Contestant	Eliminated; 4th place
2004	Half & Half	Paul	Episode: "The Big My Little Pony Episode"
2005	Yes, Dear	Homeless Man	Episode: "The Radford Reshuffle"
2009	Survivor Israel: The Philippines	Guest	Survival Expert Reward
2010	Survivor: Heroes vs. Villains	Contestant	Eliminated; 6th place
2013	Survivor: Blood vs. Water	Contestant	Eliminated; 20th place
2016	The Price Is Right	Contestant	1 episode
2019	The Amazing Race 31	Contestant	Eliminated; 10th place (with Laura Boneham)

== See also ==
- List of libertarians in the United States
