= List of Survivor (American TV series) contestants (seasons 1–20) =

Airings of the CBS reality series from 2000 to 2010

Survivor is an American reality television show, based on the Swedish program Expedition Robinson. Contestants are referred to as "castaways", and they compete against one another to become the "Sole Survivor" and win one million U.S. dollars. First airing in 2000, there currently have been a total of 50 seasons aired and a 51st upcoming. The program itself has been filmed on five continents.

Contestants usually apply to be on the show, but the series has been known to recruit contestants for various seasons. For Survivor: Fiji, the producers had hoped to have a more racially diverse cast, and hoped that a more diverse group would apply after the success of the racially segregated Survivor: Cook Islands. When this did not happen, the producers turned to recruiting and in the end, only one contestant had actually submitted an application to be on the show. For the most part, contestants are virtually unknown prior to their Survivor appearance, but occasionally some well-known people are cast.

A total of 772 participants (castaways) have competed so far (as of Survivor 51). 120 of those participants have competed in multiple seasons: 89 of them have competed in two seasons, 20 have competed in three seasons, eight have competed in four seasons, and three have competed in five seasons of the show. Fifteen seasons have featured or will feature returning players: six with all-returnees (Survivor: All-Stars in 2004, Survivor: Heroes vs. Villains in 2010, Survivor: Cambodia in 2015, Survivor: Game Changers in 2017, Survivor: Winners at War in 2020 and Survivor 50: In the Hands of the Fans in 2026), six with one to four returning players on tribes with new players (Survivor: Guatemala in 2005, Survivor: Redemption Island and Survivor: South Pacific in 2011, Survivor: Philippines in 2012, Survivor: Edge of Extinction in 2019 and Survivor 45 in 2023), two with a tribe of ten returning "Favorites" facing off against a tribe of ten "Fans" (Survivor: Micronesia in 2008 and Survivor: Caramoan in 2013), and one featuring a tribe of ten returning players playing against a tribe of their family members (Survivor: Blood vs. Water in 2013). Additionally, five contestants (Russell Hantz, Sandra Diaz-Twine, Cirie Fields, Parvati Shallow, Tony Vlachos) have competed on international editions of the series (namely, Australian Survivor, with Fields, Shallow and Vlachos competing on the international cross-over season, Australian Survivor: Australia V The World).

On two occasions, contestants have been cast but ultimately withdrew before the game began without being replaced: a 20th contestant, model agency owner Mellisa McNulty from West Hollywood, California, was originally cast in Survivor: Fiji, but dropped out and returned home the night before the show began because of panic attacks, while in Survivor: San Juan del Sur, the 19th and 20th contestants, sisters So and Doo Kim, were removed just before filming due to a medical emergency. So would later appear on the following season Survivor: Worlds Apart. Fiji, San Juan del Sur and Survivor 51 proceeded with an uneven gender balance.

== Key legend ==
Table key

^ Contestant played the game for a second time
◊ Contestant played the game for a third time

== Seasons 1–10 (2000–2005) ==
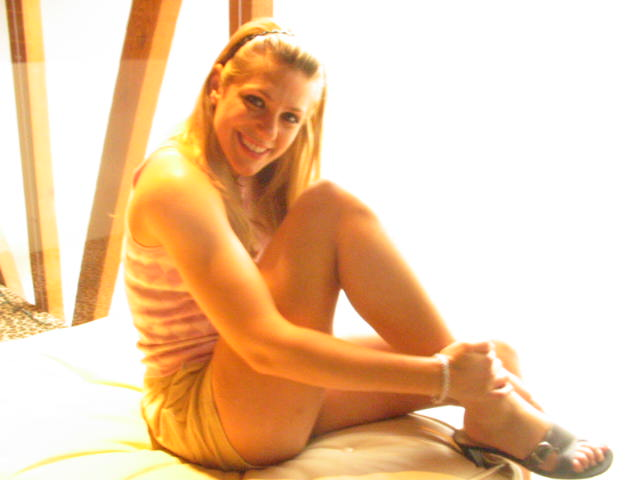
Jenna Lewis-Dougherty, Survivor: Borneo, Survivor: All-Stars and Survivor 50: In the Hands of the Fans

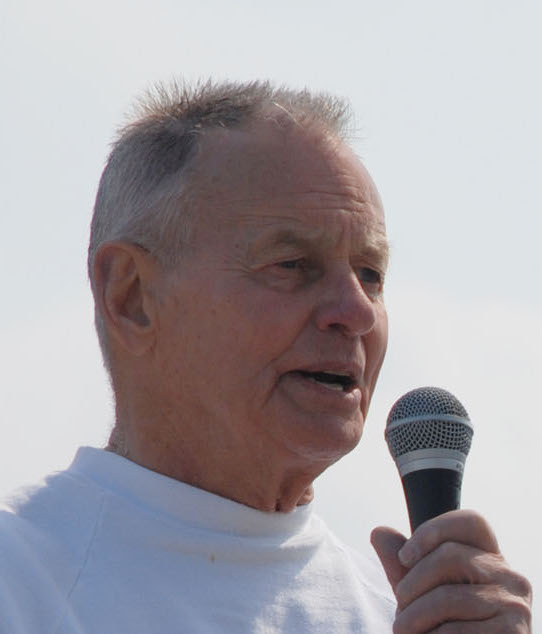
Rudy Boesch, Survivor: Borneo and Survivor: All-Stars

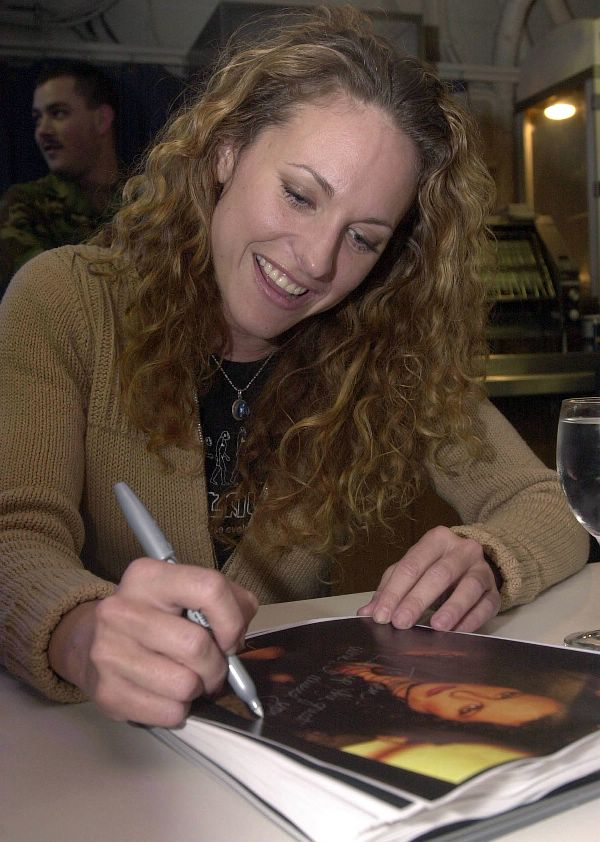
Jerri Manthey, Survivor: The Australian Outback, Survivor: All-Stars and Survivor: Heroes vs. Villains

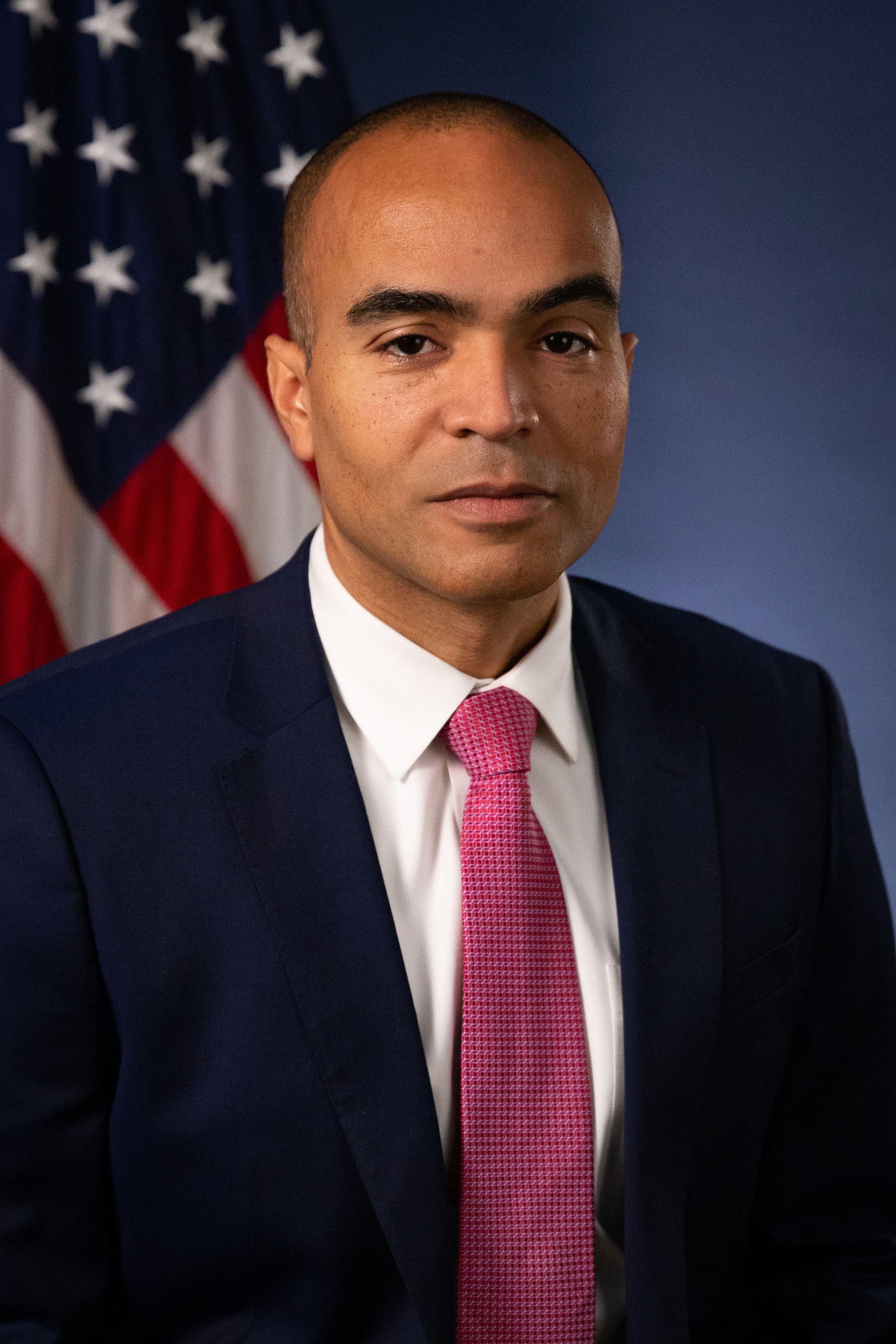
Nick Brown, Survivor: The Australian Outback

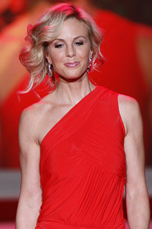
Elisabeth Filarski Hasselbeck, Survivor: The Australian Outback

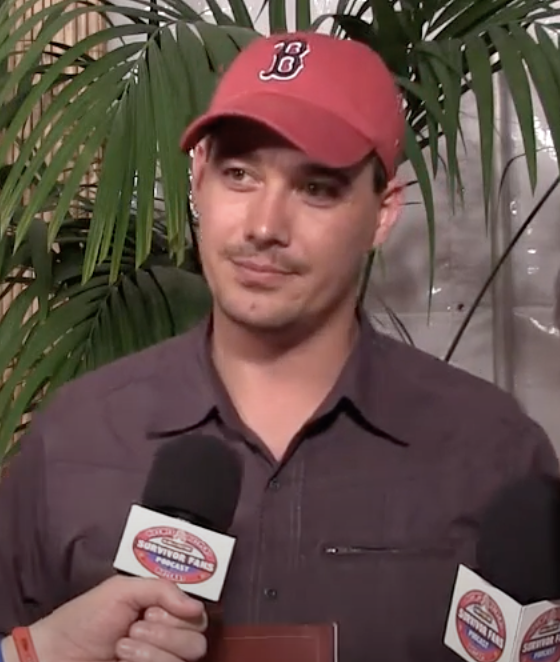
Rob Mariano, Survivor: Marquesas, Survivor: All-Stars, Survivor: Heroes vs. Villains, Survivor: Redemption Island and Survivor: Winners at War

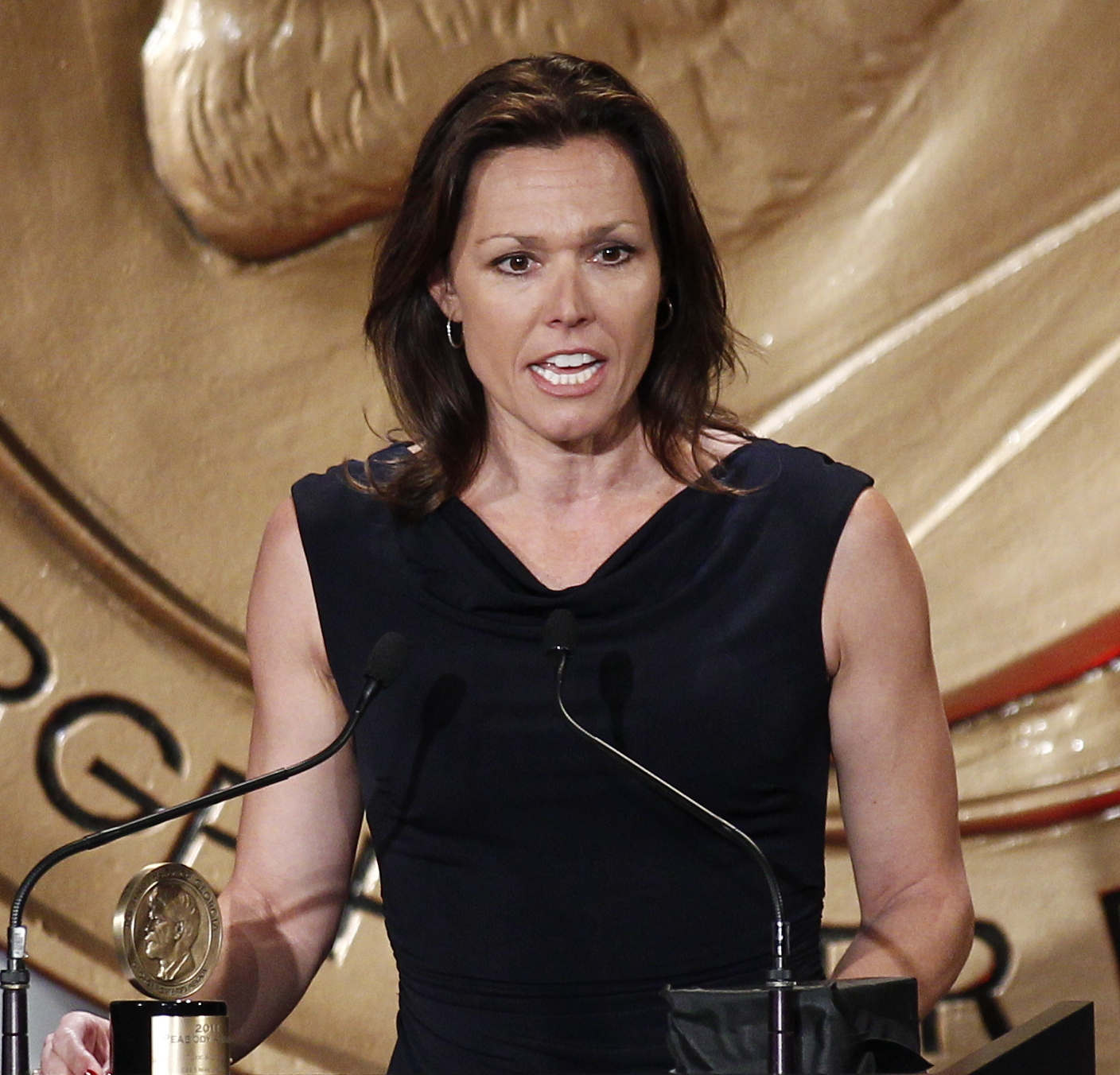
Tammy Leitner, Survivor: Marquesas

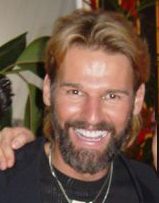
Brian Heidik, Survivor: Thailand

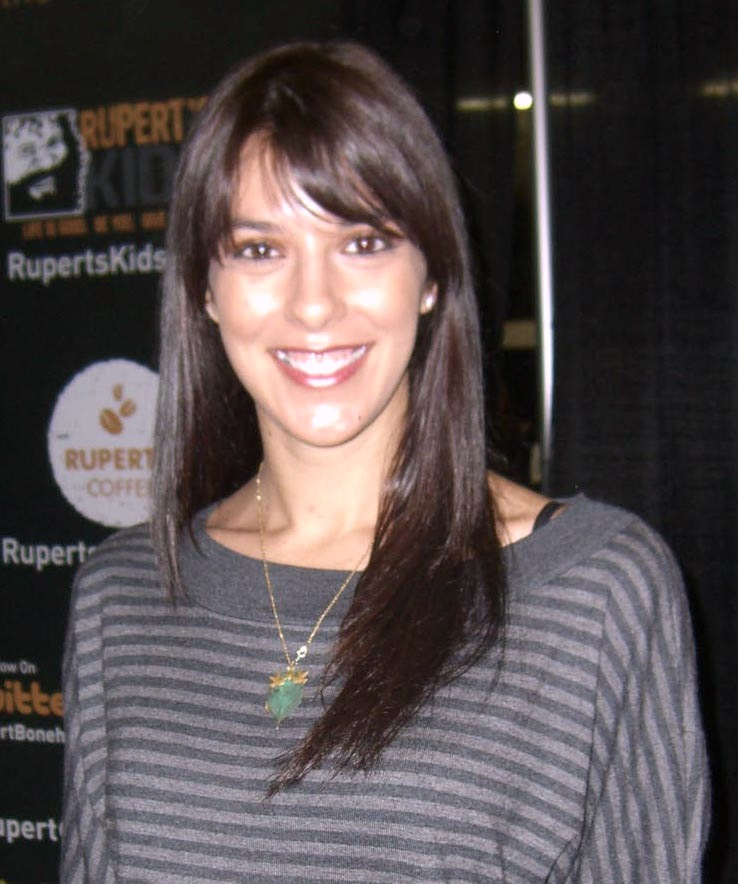
Jenna Morasca, Survivor: The Amazon and Survivor: All-Stars

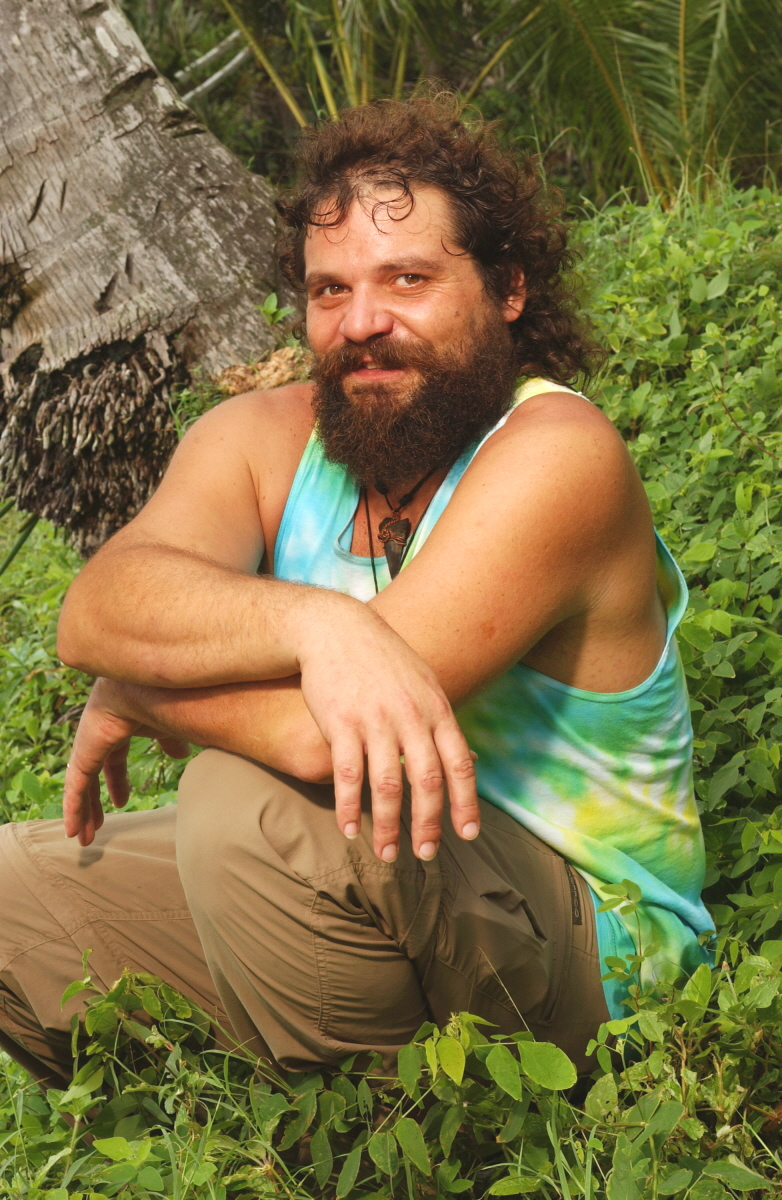
Rupert Boneham, Survivor: Pearl Islands, Survivor: All-Stars, Survivor: Heroes vs. Villains and Survivor: Blood vs. Water

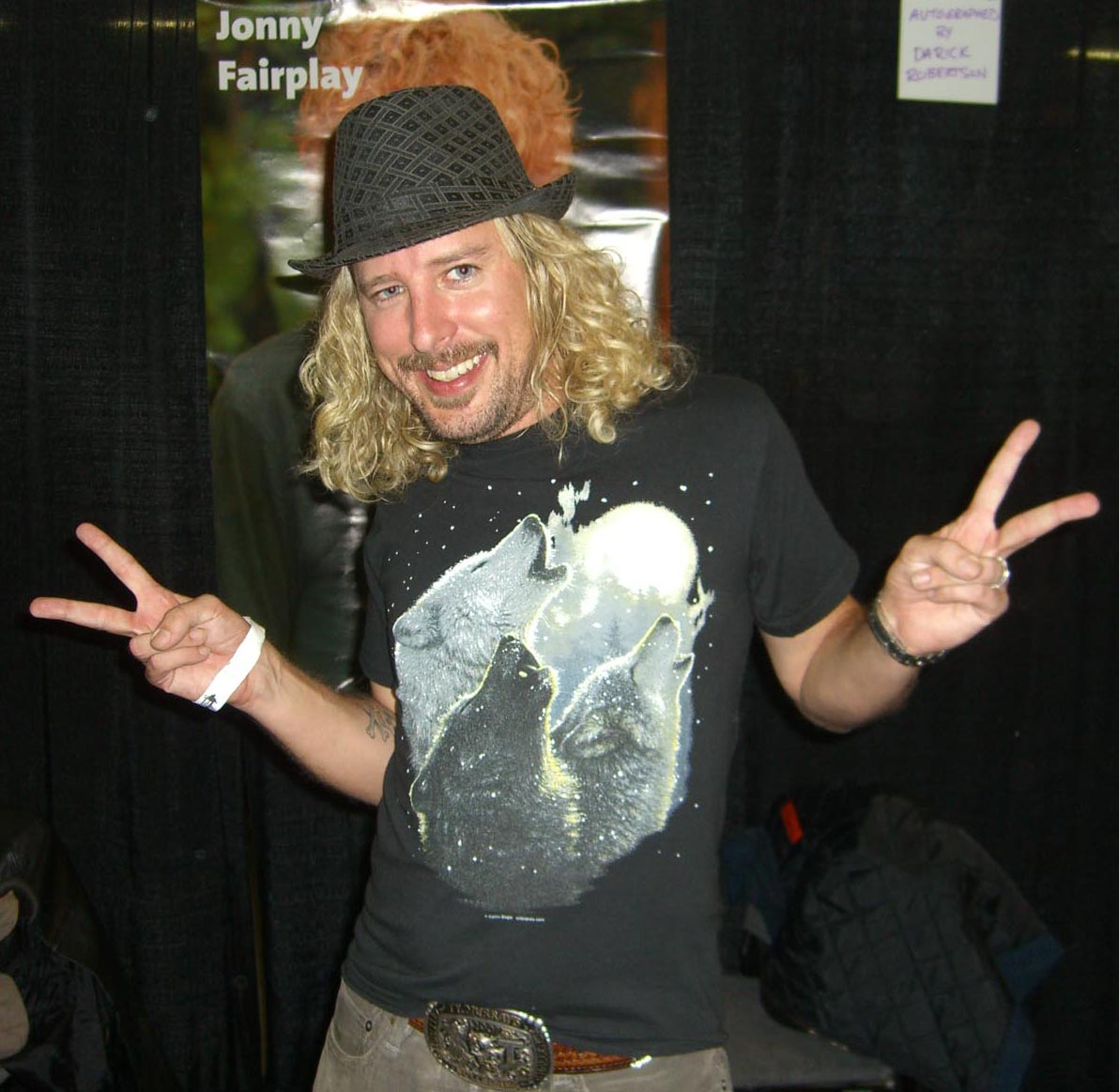
Jonny Fairplay, Survivor: Pearl Islands and Survivor: Micronesia

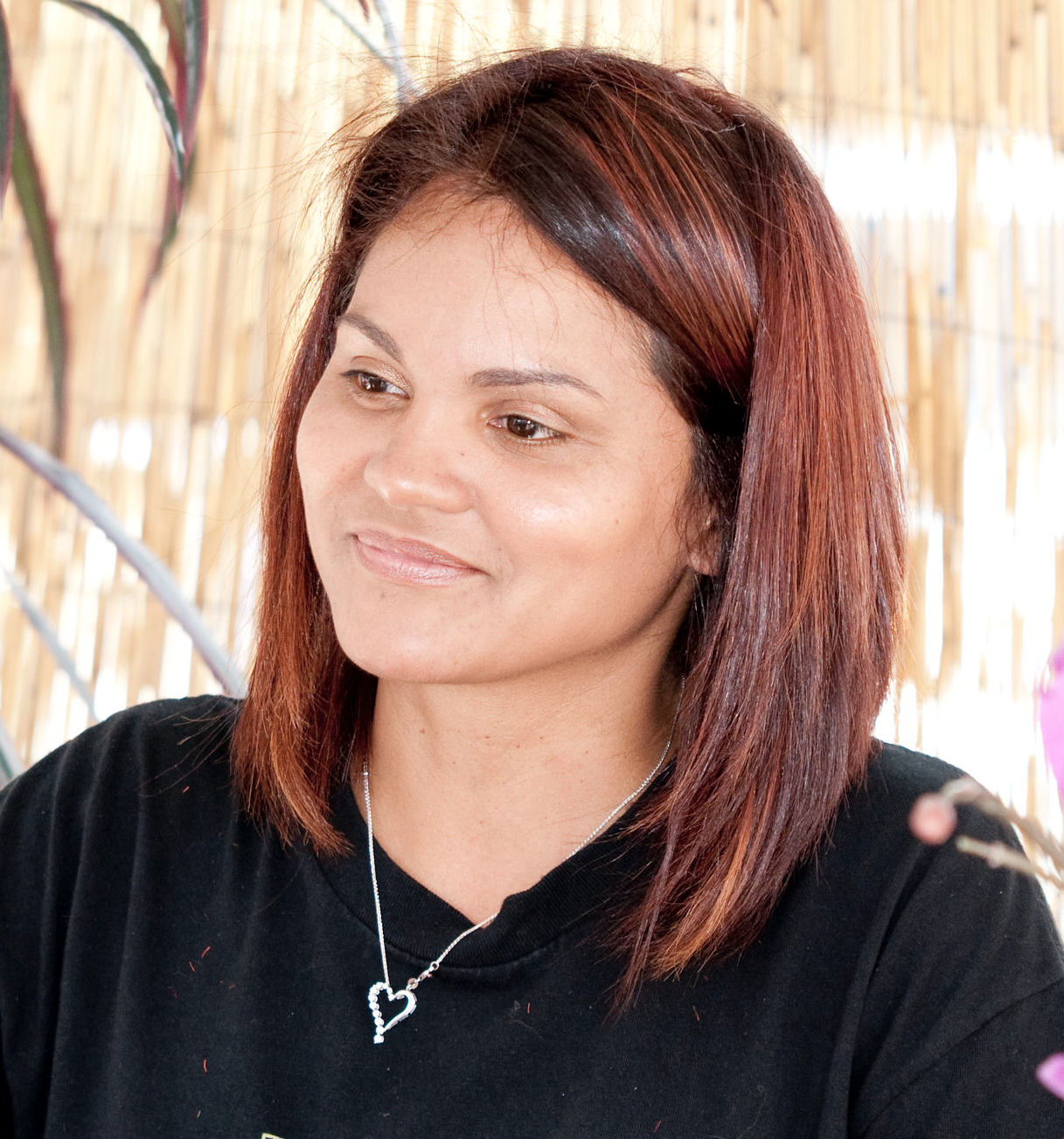
Sandra Diaz-Twine, Survivor: Pearl Islands, Survivor: Heroes vs. Villains, Survivor: Game Changers and Survivor: Winners at War

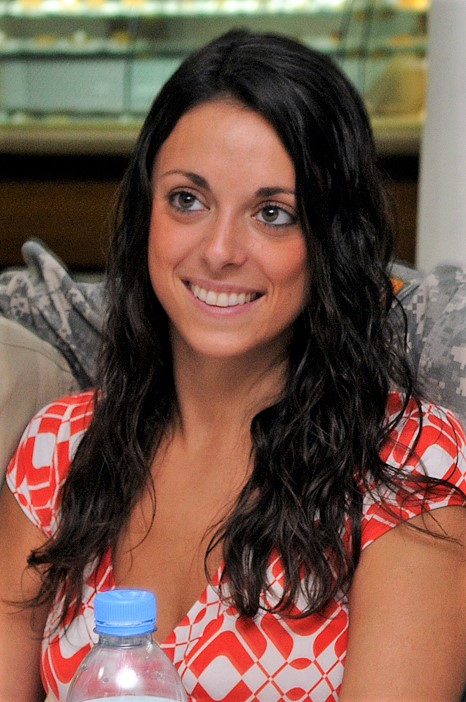
Eliza Orlins, Survivor: Vanuatu and Survivor: Micronesia

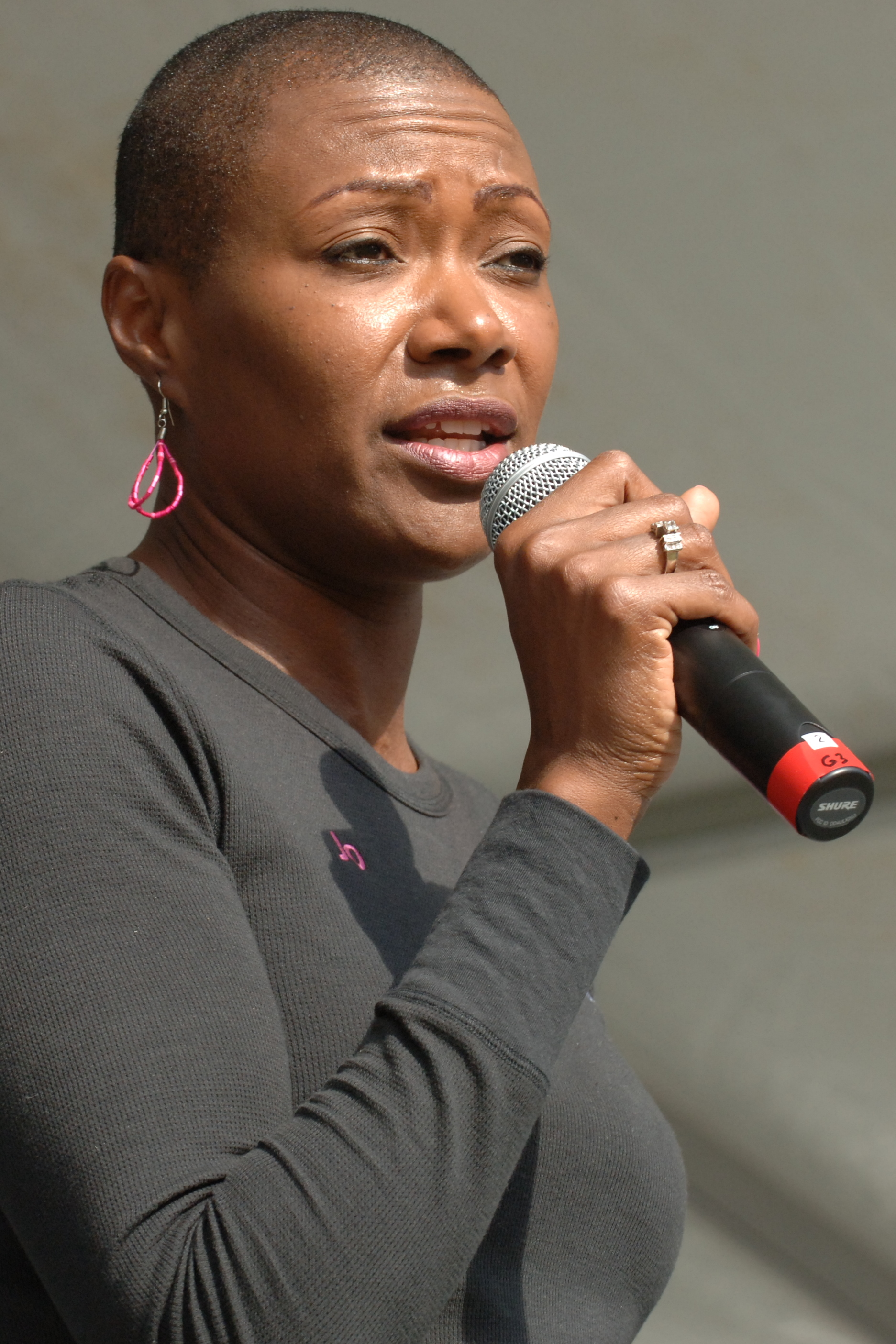
Jolanda Jones, Survivor: Palau

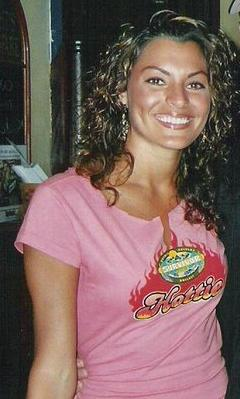
Stephenie LaGrossa, Survivor: Palau, Survivor: Guatemala, Survivor: Heroes vs. Villains and Survivor 50: In the Hands of the Fans

All information is accurate as of the time the season was filmed, and thus may vary from season to season for returning players.

Name	Age	Hometown	Profession	Season	Finish
Sonja Christopher	63	Walnut Creek, CA	Musician	Survivor: Borneo	16th
Bill "B.B." Andersen	64	Mission Hills, KS	Real Estate Developer	Survivor: Borneo	15th
Stacey Stillman	27	San Francisco, CA	Attorney	Survivor: Borneo	14th
Ramona Gray	29	Edison, NJ	Biochemist	Survivor: Borneo	13th
Dirk Been	23	Spring Green, WI	Dairy Farmer	Survivor: Borneo	12th
Joel Klug	27	Sherwood, AR	Health Club Consultant	Survivor: Borneo	11th
Gretchen Cordy	38	Clarksville, TN	Teacher	Survivor: Borneo	10th
Greg Buis	24	Gold Hill, CO	Ivy League Graduate	Survivor: Borneo	9th
Jenna Lewis	22	Franklin, NH	Student	Survivor: Borneo	8th
Gervase Peterson	30	Willingboro, NJ	YMCA Basketball Coach	Survivor: Borneo	7th
Colleen Haskell	23	Miami Beach, FL	Student	Survivor: Borneo	6th
Sean Kenniff	30	Carle Place, NY	Neurologist	Survivor: Borneo	5th
Sue Hawk	38	Palmyra, WI	Truck Driver	Survivor: Borneo	4th
Rudy Boesch	72	Virginia Beach, VA	Retired NAVY Seal	Survivor: Borneo	3rd
Kelly Wiglesworth	22	Kernville, CA	River Rafting Guide	Survivor: Borneo	Runner-up
Richard Hatch	39	Newport, RI	Corporate Trainer	Survivor: Borneo	Winner
Debb Eaton	45	Milan, NH	Corrections Officer	Survivor: The Australian Outback	16th
Kel Gleason	32	Fort Hood, TX	Army Intelligence Officer	Survivor: The Australian Outback	15th
Maralyn "Mad Dog" Hershey	51	Wakefield, VA	Retired Police Officer	Survivor: The Australian Outback	14th
Mitchell Olson	23	Union City, NJ	Singer/Songwriter	Survivor: The Australian Outback	13th
Kimmi Kappenberg	28	Ronkonkoma, NY	Bartender	Survivor: The Australian Outback	12th
Michael Skupin	38	White Lake, MI	Software Publisher	Survivor: The Australian Outback	11th
Jeff Varner	34	New York, NY	Internet Projects Manager	Survivor: The Australian Outback	10th
Alicia Calaway	32	New York, NY	Personal Trainer	Survivor: The Australian Outback	9th
Jerri Manthey	30	Los Angeles, CA	Aspiring Actress	Survivor: The Australian Outback	8th
Nick Brown	23	Steilacoom, WA	Law Student	Survivor: The Australian Outback	7th
Amber Brkich	22	Beaver, PA	Administrative Assistant	Survivor: The Australian Outback	6th
Rodger Bingham	53	Crittenden, KY	Teacher/Farmer	Survivor: The Australian Outback	5th
Elisabeth Filarski	23	Newton, MA	Footwear Designer	Survivor: The Australian Outback	4th
Keith Famie	40	West Bloomfield, MI	Chef	Survivor: The Australian Outback	3rd
Colby Donaldson	26	Dallas, TX	Auto Customizer	Survivor: The Australian Outback	Runner-up
Tina Wesson	39	Knoxville, TN	Personal Nurse	Survivor: The Australian Outback	Winner
Diane Ogden	42	Lincoln, NE	Mail Carrier	Survivor: Africa	16th
Yesenia "Jessie" Camacho	27	Orlando, FL	Sheriff	Survivor: Africa	15th
Carl Bilancione	46	Winter Springs, FL	Dentist	Survivor: Africa	14th
Linda Spencer	44	Boston, MA	Career Counselor	Survivor: Africa	13th
Silas Gaither	23	Los Angeles, CA	Bartender	Survivor: Africa	12th
Lindsey Richter	27	Portland, OR	Advertising Executive	Survivor: Africa	11th
Clarence Black	24	Detroit, MI	Basketball Coach	Survivor: Africa	10th
Kelly Goldsmith	22	San Diego, CA	Behavior Analyst	Survivor: Africa	9th
Brandon Quinton	25	Dallas, TX	Bartender	Survivor: Africa	8th
Frank Garrison	43	Odessa, NY	Telephone Technician	Survivor: Africa	7th
Kimberly "Kim" Powers	29	Conshohocken, PA	Freelance Marketer	Survivor: Africa	6th
Teresa Cooper	42	Jackson, GA	Flight Attendant	Survivor: Africa	5th
Tom "Big Tom" Buchanan	46	Rich Valley, VA	Goat Farmer	Survivor: Africa	4th
Alexis "Lex" van den Berghe	38	Santa Cruz, CA	Marketing Manager	Survivor: Africa	3rd
Kim Johnson	57	Oyster Bay, NY	Retired Teacher	Survivor: Africa	Runner-up
Ethan Zohn	27	New York, NY	Professional Soccer Player	Survivor: Africa	Winner
Peter Harkey	45	Millis, MA	Bowling Alley Owner	Survivor: Marquesas	16th
Patricia Jackson	49	Lugoff, SC	Truck Assembler	Survivor: Marquesas	15th
Hunter Ellis	33	La Jolla, CA	Ex-Navy Fighter Pilot	Survivor: Marquesas	14th
Sarah Jones	24	Newport Beach, CA	Account Manager	Survivor: Marquesas	13th
Gabriel "Gabe" Cade	23	Hollywood, CA	Bartender	Survivor: Marquesas	12th
Gina Crews	28	Gainesville, FL	Nature Guide	Survivor: Marquesas	11th
Robert "Rob" Mariano	26	Canton, MA	Construction Worker	Survivor: Marquesas	10th
John Carroll	36	Omaha, NE	Nurse	Survivor: Marquesas	9th
Zoe Zanidakis	35	Monhegan Island, ME	Fishing Boat Captain	Survivor: Marquesas	8th
Tammy Leitner	29	Mesa, AZ	Crime Reporter	Survivor: Marquesas	7th
Robert "The General" DeCanio	38	College Point, NY	Limousine Driver	Survivor: Marquesas	6th
Sean Rector	30	Los Angeles, CA	Teacher	Survivor: Marquesas	5th
Paschal "Pappy" English	57	Thomaston, GA	Judge	Survivor: Marquesas	4th
Kathleen "Kathy" Vavrick-O'Brien	47	Burlington, VT	Real Estate Agent	Survivor: Marquesas	3rd
Neleh Dennis	21	Layton, UT	Student	Survivor: Marquesas	Runner-up
Vecepia Towery	36	Hayward, CA	Office Manager	Survivor: Marquesas	Winner
John Raymond	40	Slidell, LA	Pastor	Survivor: Thailand	16th
Tanya Vance	27	Kingsport, TN	Social Worker	Survivor: Thailand	15th
Jed Hildebrand	25	Dallas, TX	Dental Student	Survivor: Thailand	14th
Ghandia Johnson	33	Denver, CO	Legal Secretary	Survivor: Thailand	13th
Stephanie Dill	29	Fayetteville, AR	Firefighter	Survivor: Thailand	12th
Robert "Robb" Zbacnik	23	Scottsdale, AZ	Bartender	Survivor: Thailand	11th
Shii Ann Huang	28	New York, NY	Executive Recruiter	Survivor: Thailand	10th
Erin Collins	26	Austin, TX	Real Estate Agent	Survivor: Thailand	9th
Kenneth "Ken" Stafford	30	Brooklyn, NY	Police Officer	Survivor: Thailand	8th
Penny Ramsey	27	Plano, TX	Pharmaceutical Saleswoman	Survivor: Thailand	7th
Jake Billingsley	61	McKinney, TX	Land Broker	Survivor: Thailand	6th
Ted Rogers, Jr.	37	Durham, NC	Software Developer	Survivor: Thailand	5th
Helen Glover	47	Middletown, RI	Navy Swim Instructor	Survivor: Thailand	4th
Jan Gentry	53	Tampa, FL	Teacher	Survivor: Thailand	3rd
Clay Jordan	46	Monroe, LA	Restaurant Owner	Survivor: Thailand	Runner-up
Brian Heidik	34	Quartz Hill, CA	Used Car Salesman	Survivor: Thailand	Winner
Ryan Aiken	23	Ellicott City, MD	Model	Survivor: The Amazon	16th
Janet Koth	47	Manchester, MO	Homemaker	Survivor: The Amazon	15th
Daniel Lue	27	Houston, TX	Tax Accountant	Survivor: The Amazon	14th
JoAnna Ward	31	Orangeburg, SC	Guidance Counselor	Survivor: The Amazon	13th
Jeanne Hebert	41	North Attleborough, MA	Marketing Director	Survivor: The Amazon	12th
Shawna Mitchell	23	Redwood City, CA	Retail Saleswoman	Survivor: The Amazon	11th
Roger Sexton	56	Valencia, CA	Construction Company Vice President	Survivor: The Amazon	10th
Dave Johnson	24	Pasadena, CA	Rocket Scientist	Survivor: The Amazon	9th
Deena Bennett	35	Riverside, CA	Deputy District Attorney	Survivor: The Amazon	8th
Alex Bell	32	Los Angeles, CA	Triathlon Coach	Survivor: The Amazon	7th
Christy Smith	24	Basalt, CO	Children's Adventure Guide	Survivor: The Amazon	6th
Heidi Strobel	24	Jefferson City, MO	Gym Teacher	Survivor: The Amazon	5th
Butch Lockley	50	Olney, IL	School Principal	Survivor: The Amazon	4th
Rob Cesternino	24	Wantagh, NY	Computer Projects Coordinator	Survivor: The Amazon	3rd
Matthew von Ertfelda	33	Washington, D.C.	Restaurant Designer	Survivor: The Amazon	Runner-up
Jenna Morasca	21	Pittsburgh, PA	Swimsuit Model	Survivor: The Amazon	Winner
Nicole Delma	24	Hermosa Beach, CA	Massage Therapist	Survivor: Pearl Islands	16th
Ryan Shoulders	23	Clarksville, TN	Produce Clerk	Survivor: Pearl Islands	15th
Michelle Tesauro	22	Pittstown, NJ	Student	Survivor: Pearl Islands	14th
Trish Dunn	42	Annapolis, MD	Sales Executive	Survivor: Pearl Islands	13th
Shawn Cohen	28	New York, NY	Advertising Salesman	Survivor: Pearl Islands	12th
Osten Taylor	27	Boston, MA	Equity Trade Manager	Survivor: Pearl Islands	11th
Andrew Savage	40	Chicago, IL	Attorney	Survivor: Pearl Islands	10th
Ryan Opray	31	Los Gatos, CA	Electrician	Survivor: Pearl Islands	9th
Rupert Boneham	39	Indianapolis, IN	Troubled Teens Mentor	Survivor: Pearl Islands	8th
Tijuana Bradley	27	St. Louis, MO	Pharmaceutical Saleswoman	Survivor: Pearl Islands	7th
Christa Hastie	24	Los Angeles, CA	Computer Programmer	Survivor: Pearl Islands	6th
Burton Roberts	31	San Francisco, CA	Marketing Executive	Survivor: Pearl Islands	5th
Darrah Johnson	22	Liberty, MS	Mortician	Survivor: Pearl Islands	4th
Jon "Jonny Fairplay" Dalton	29	Danville, VA	Art Consultant	Survivor: Pearl Islands	3rd
Lillian Morris	51	Cincinnati, OH	Scoutmaster	Survivor: Pearl Islands	Runner-up
Sandra Diaz-Twine	29	Fort Lewis, WA	Office Assistant	Survivor: Pearl Islands	Winner
Tina Wesson^{^}	42	Knoxville, TN	Motivational Speaker	Survivor: All-Stars	18th
Rudy Boesch^{^}	75	Virginia Beach, VA	Retired Navy Seal	Survivor: All-Stars	17th
Jenna Morasca^{^}	22	Pittsburgh, PA	Swimsuit Model	Survivor: All-Stars	16th
Rob Cesternino^{^}	25	Wantagh, NY	Computer Projects Coordinator	Survivor: All-Stars	15th
Richard Hatch^{^}	42	Newport, RI	Corporate Trainer	Survivor: All-Stars	14th
Sue Hawk^{^}	42	Palmyra, WI	Waitress/Bartender	Survivor: All-Stars	13th
Colby Donaldson^{^}	29	Dallas, TX	Actor	Survivor: All-Stars	12th
Ethan Zohn^{^}	30	Lexington, MA	Motivational Speaker	Survivor: All-Stars	11th
Jerri Manthey^{^}	33	Los Angeles, CA	Actress	Survivor: All-Stars	10th
Alexis "Lex" van den Berghe^{^}	40	Santa Cruz, CA	Freelance Writer	Survivor: All-Stars	9th
Kathy Vavrick-O'Brien^{^}	49	Burlington, VT	Real Estate Agent	Survivor: All-Stars	8th
Alicia Calaway^{^}	35	New York, NY	Health and Fitness Reporter	Survivor: All-Stars	7th
Shii Ann Huang^{^}	30	New York, NY	Executive Recruiter	Survivor: All-Stars	6th
Tom Buchanan^{^}	48	Rich Valley, VA	Goat Farmer	Survivor: All-Stars	5th
Rupert Boneham^{^}	40	Indianapolis, IN	Troubled Teens Mentor	Survivor: All-Stars	4th
Jenna Lewis^{^}	26	Franklin, NH	Actress	Survivor: All-Stars	3rd
Rob Mariano^{^}	28	Canton, MA	Construction Worker	Survivor: All-Stars	Runner-up
Amber Brkich^{^}	25	Beaver, PA	Administrative Assistant	Survivor: All-Stars	Winner
Brook Geraghty	27	Winthrop, MA	Document Manager	Survivor: Vanuatu	18th
Janean "Dolly" Neely	25	Mercer, PA	Sheep Farmer	Survivor: Vanuatu	17th
John "J.P." Palyok	31	Los Angeles, CA	Sales Manager	Survivor: Vanuatu	16th
Mia Galeotalanza	30	Toms River, NJ	Bookkeeper	Survivor: Vanuatu	15th
Brady Finta	33	Huntington Beach, CA	FBI Agent	Survivor: Vanuatu	14th
Travis "Bubba" Sampson	33	Blountville, TN	Security Officer	Survivor: Vanuatu	13th
Lisa Keiffer	44	New Orleans, LA	Real State Agent	Survivor: Vanuatu	12th
John Kenney	22	Los Angeles, CA	Mechanical Bull Operator/Model	Survivor: Vanuatu	11th
Rory Freeman	35	Des Moines, IA	Housing Case Manager	Survivor: Vanuatu	10th
Lea "Sarge" Masters	40	Columbia, SC	Drill Sergeant	Survivor: Vanuatu	9th
James "Chad" Crittenden	35	Oakland, CA	Teacher	Survivor: Vanuatu	8th
Leann Slaby	35	Kansasville, WI	Equity Research Assistant	Survivor: Vanuatu	7th
Ami Cusack	31	Lakewood, CO	Coffee Barista	Survivor: Vanuatu	6th
Julie Berry	23	Gorham, ME	Youth Mentor	Survivor: Vanuatu	5th
Eliza Orlins	21	Syracuse, NY	Pre-Law Student	Survivor: Vanuatu	4th
Scout Cloud Lee	59	Stillwater, OK	Rancher	Survivor: Vanuatu	3rd
Twila Tanner	41	Marshall, MO	Highway Repair Worker	Survivor: Vanuatu	Runner-up
Chris Daugherty	33	South Vienna, OH	Highway Construction Worker	Survivor: Vanuatu	Winner
Jonathan Libby	23	Dallas, TX	Sales & Marketing Associate	Survivor: Palau	20th
Wanda Shirk	55	Ulysses, PA	English Teacher	Survivor: Palau	19th
Jolanda Jones	39	Houston, TX	Attorney	Survivor: Palau	18th
Ashlee Ashby	22	Easley, SC	Student	Survivor: Palau	17th
Jeff Wilson	21	Ventura, CA	Personal Trainer	Survivor: Palau	16th
Kim Mullen	25	Huber Heights, OH	Graduate Student	Survivor: Palau	15th
Willard Smith	57	Bellevue, WA	Attorney	Survivor: Palau	14th
Cassandra "Angie" Jakusz	24	New Orleans, LA	Bartender	Survivor: Palau	13th
James Miller	33	Mobile, AL	Steelworker	Survivor: Palau	12th
Ibrehem Rahman	27	Birmingham, AL	Model	Survivor: Palau	11th
Bobby Jon Drinkard	27	Troy, AL	Waiter	Survivor: Palau	10th
Coby Archa	32	Dallas, TX	Hairdresser	Survivor: Palau	9th
Janu Tornell	39	Las Vegas, NV	Vegas Showgirl	Survivor: Palau	8th
Stephenie LaGrossa	25	Glenolden, PA	Pharmaceutical Sales Representative	Survivor: Palau	7th
Gregg Carey	27	Chicago, IL	Business Consultant	Survivor: Palau	6th
Caryn Groedel	46	Solon, OH	Civil Rights Attorney	Survivor: Palau	5th
Jennifer Lyon	32	Encino, CA	Nanny	Survivor: Palau	4th
Ian Rosenberger	23	Key Largo, FL	Dolphin Trainer	Survivor: Palau	3rd
Katie Gallagher	29	Merced, CA	Advertising Executive	Survivor: Palau	Runner-up
Tom Westman	41	Sayville, NY	Firefighter	Survivor: Palau	Winner

== Seasons 11–20 (2005–2010) ==
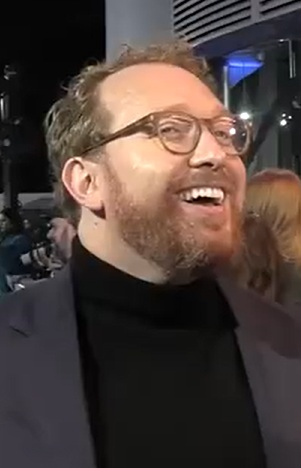
Rafe Judkins, Survivor: Guatemala

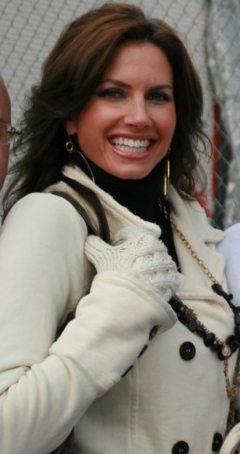
Danni Boatwright, Survivor: Guatemala and Survivor: Winners at War

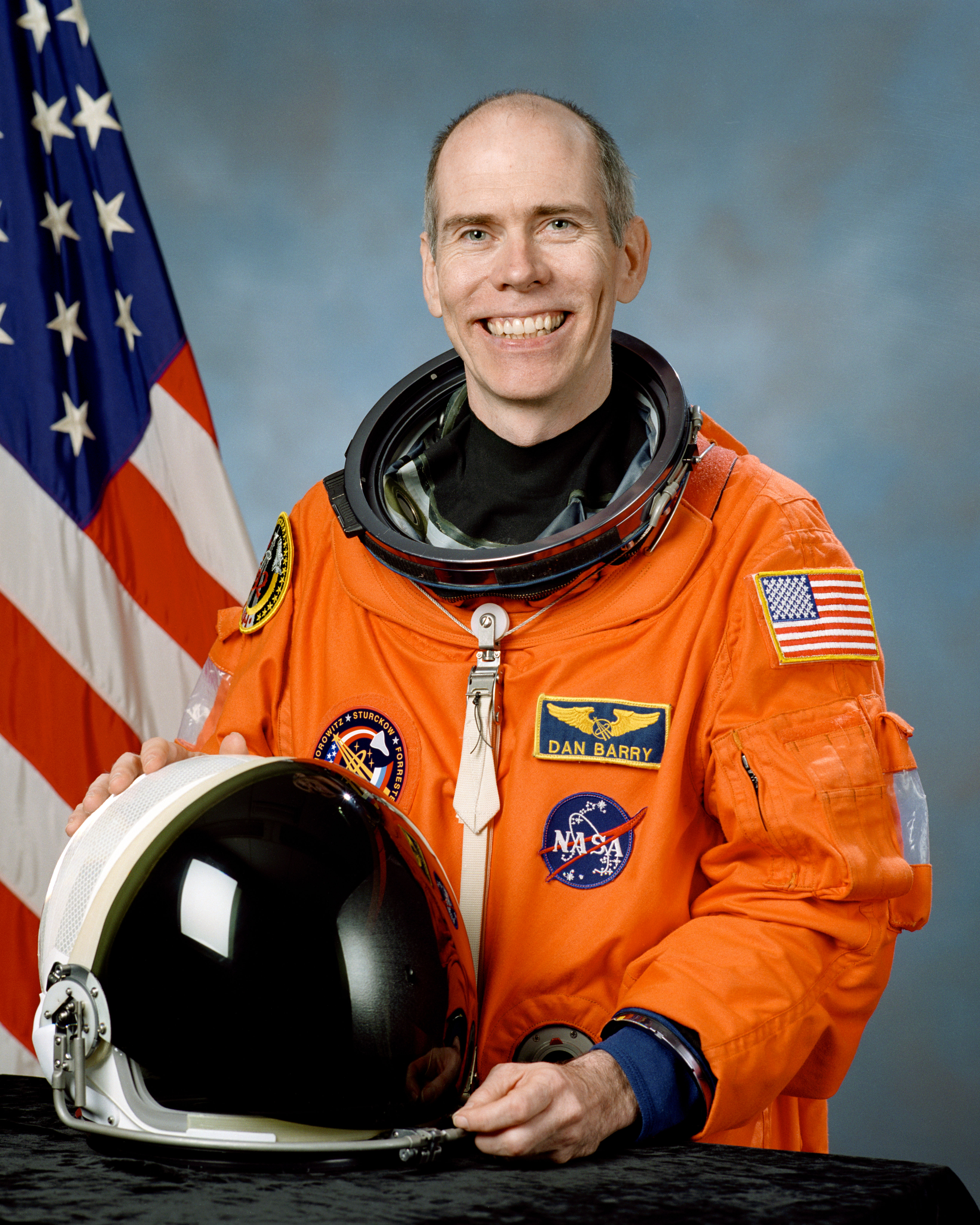
Dan Barry, Survivor: Panama

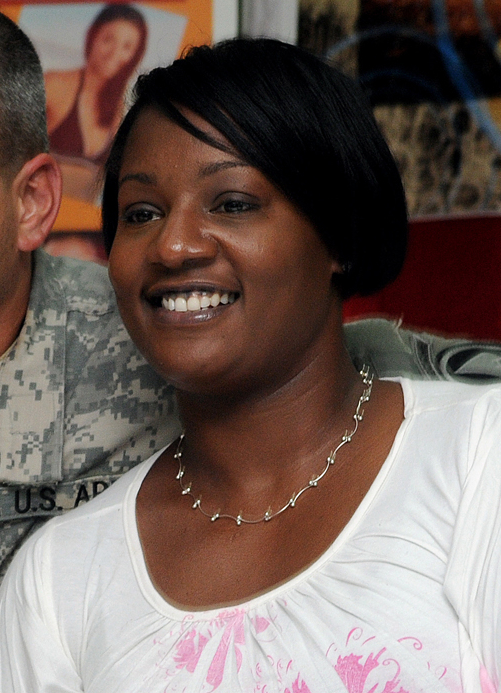
Cirie Fields, Survivor: Panama, Survivor: Micronesia, Survivor: Heroes vs. Villains, Survivor: Game Changers and Survivor 50: In the Hands of the Fans

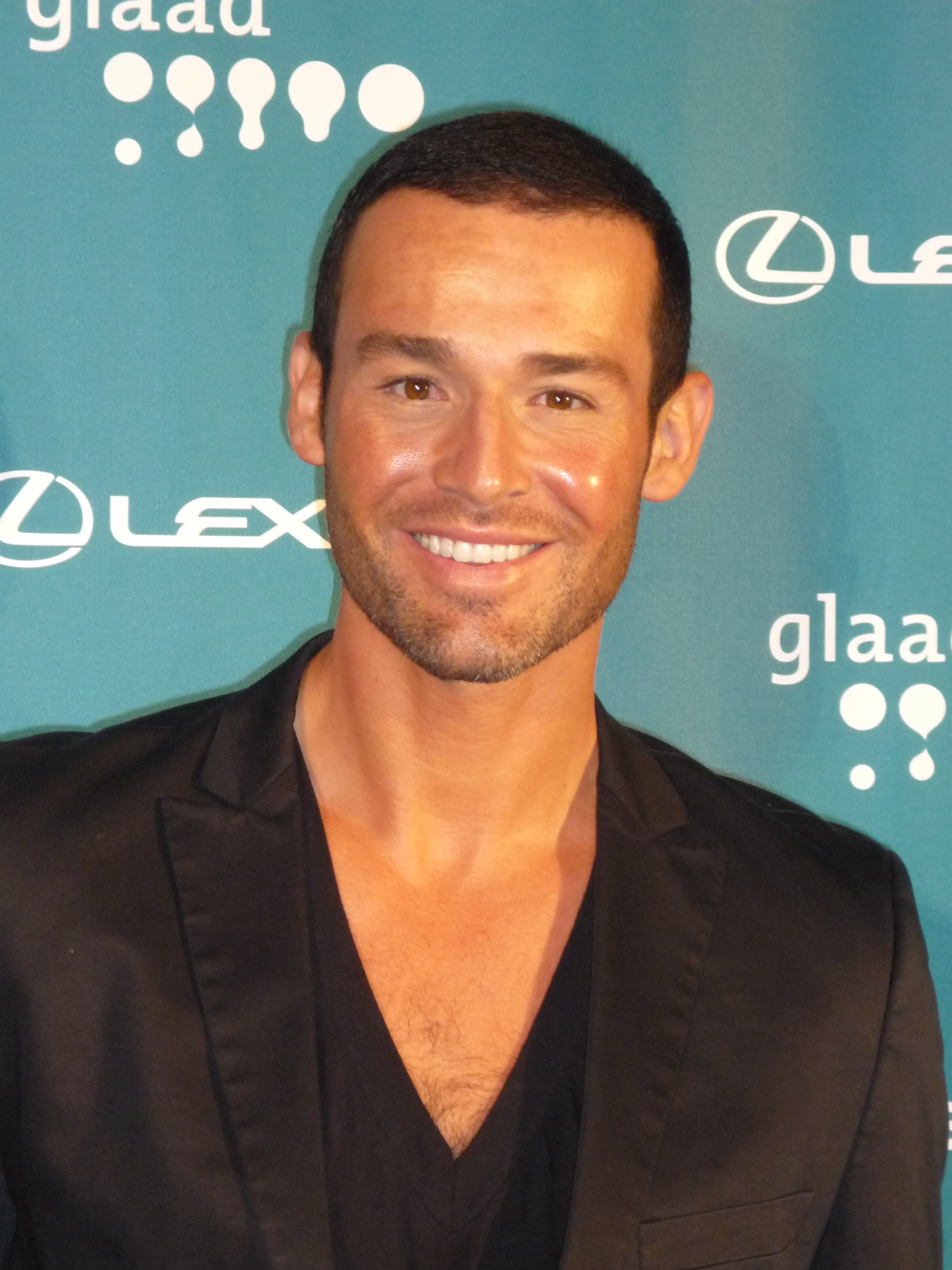
J. P. Calderon, Survivor: Cook Islands

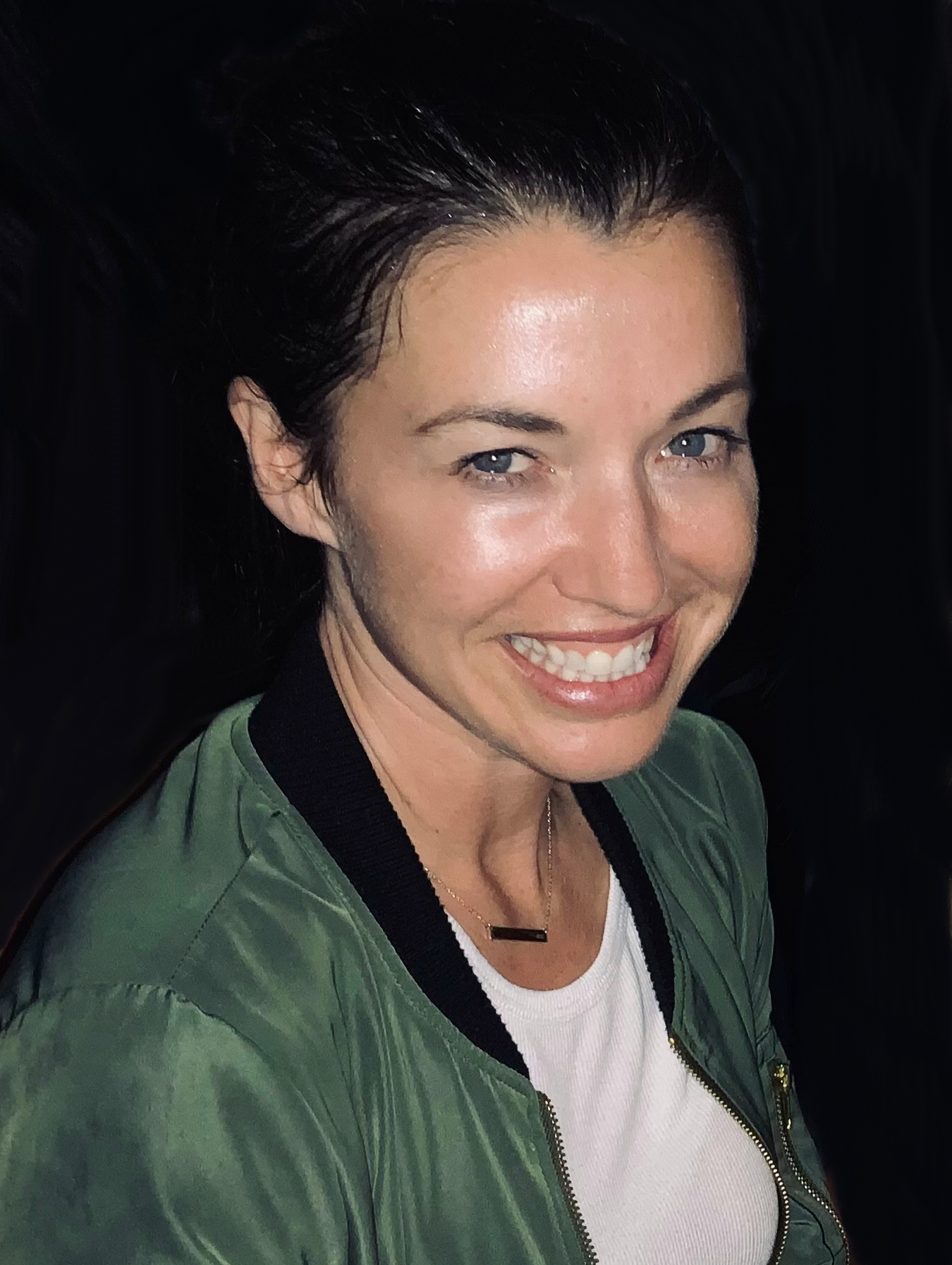
Parvati Shallow, Survivor: Cook Islands, Survivor: Micronesia, Survivor: Heroes vs. Villains and Survivor: Winners at War

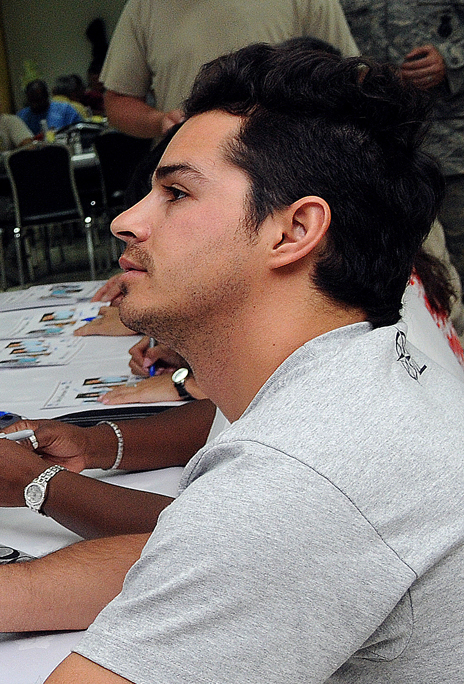
Ozzy Lusth, Survivor: Cook Islands, Survivor: Micronesia, Survivor: South Pacific, Survivor: Game Changers and Survivor 50: In the Hands of the Fans

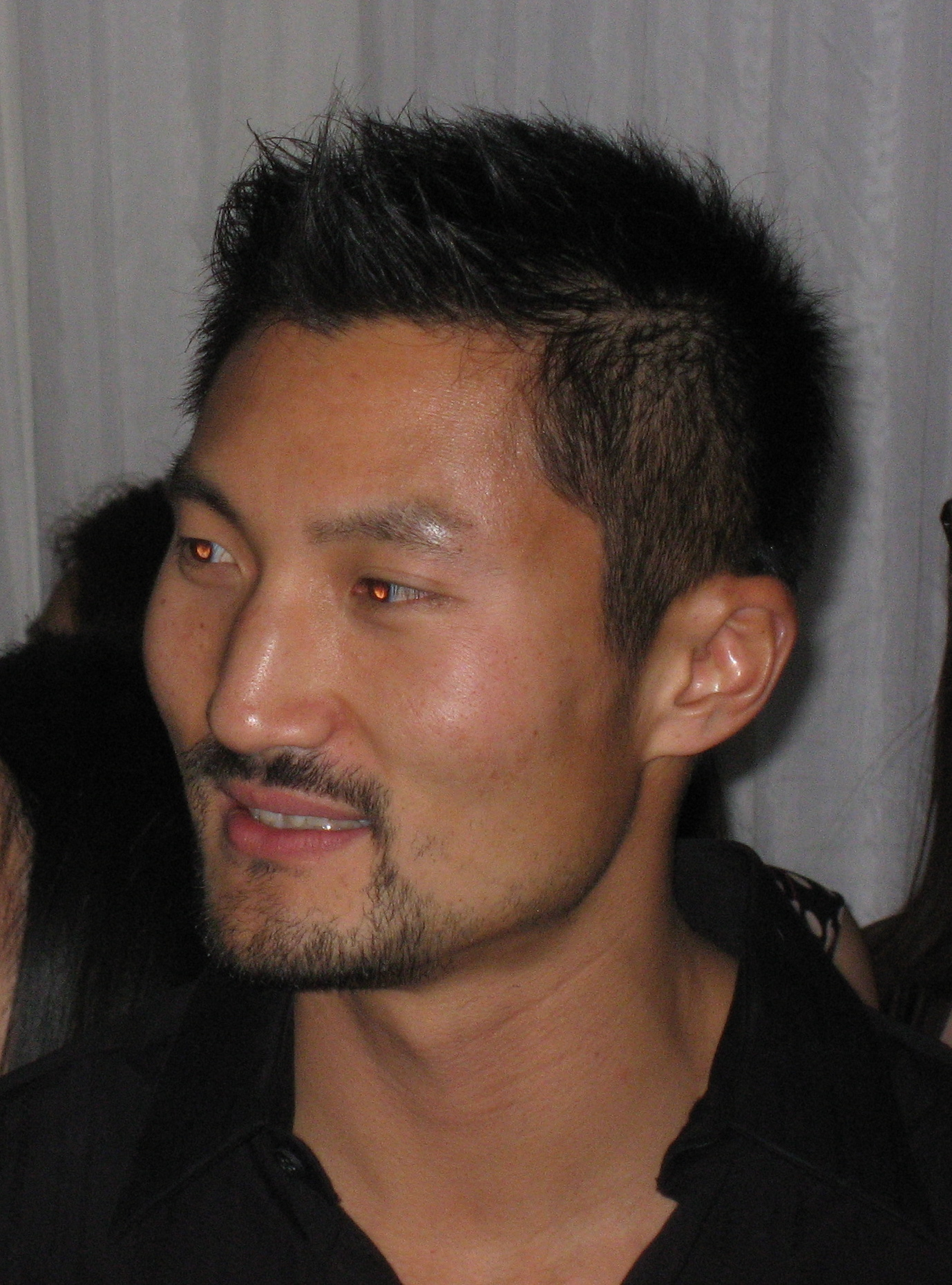
Yul Kwon, Survivor: Cook Islands and Survivor: Winners at War

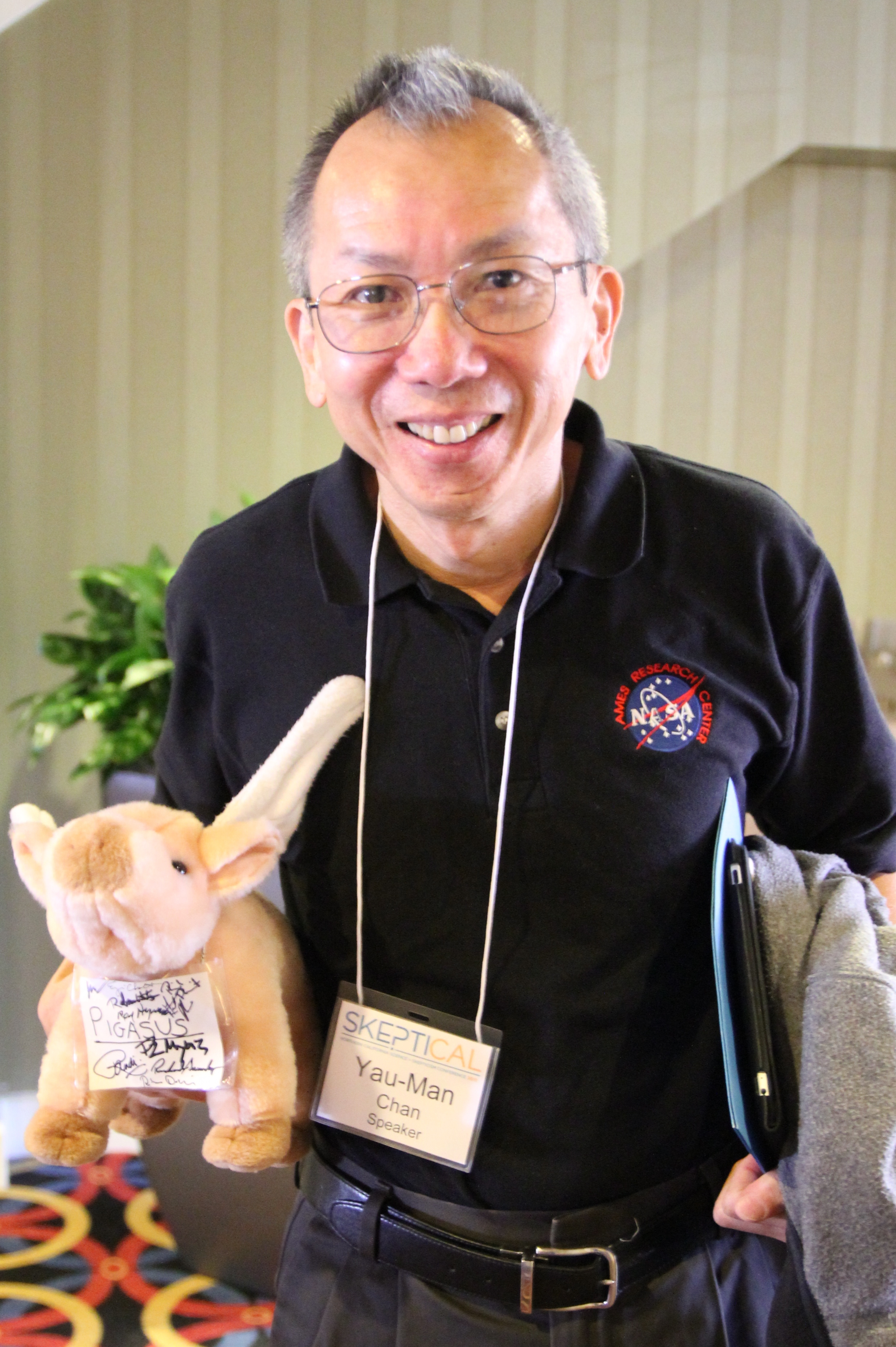
Yau-Man Chan, Survivor: Fiji and Survivor: Micronesia

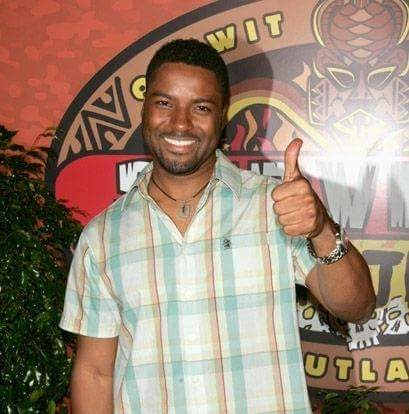
Earl Cole, Survivor: Fiji

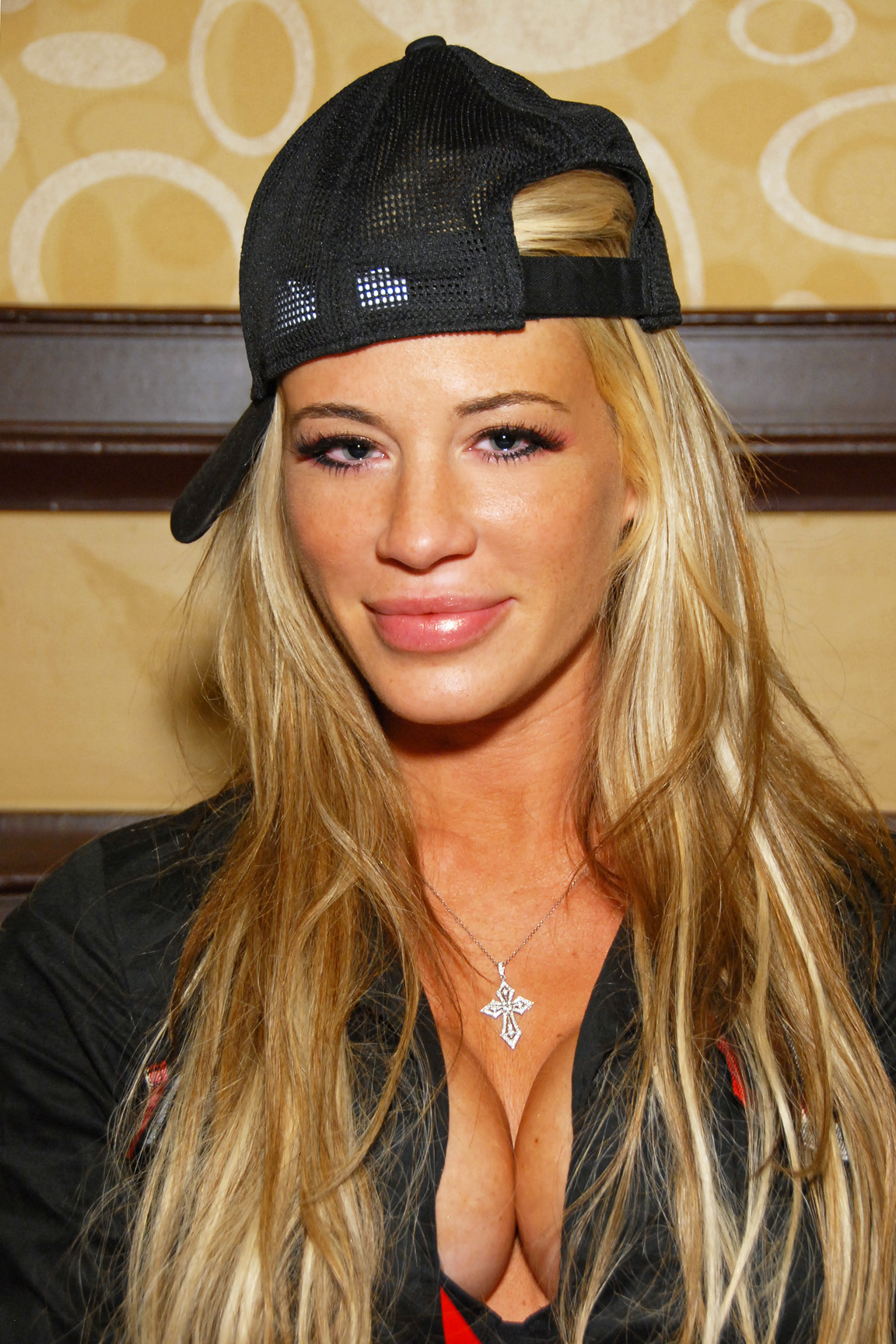
Ashley Massaro, Survivor: China

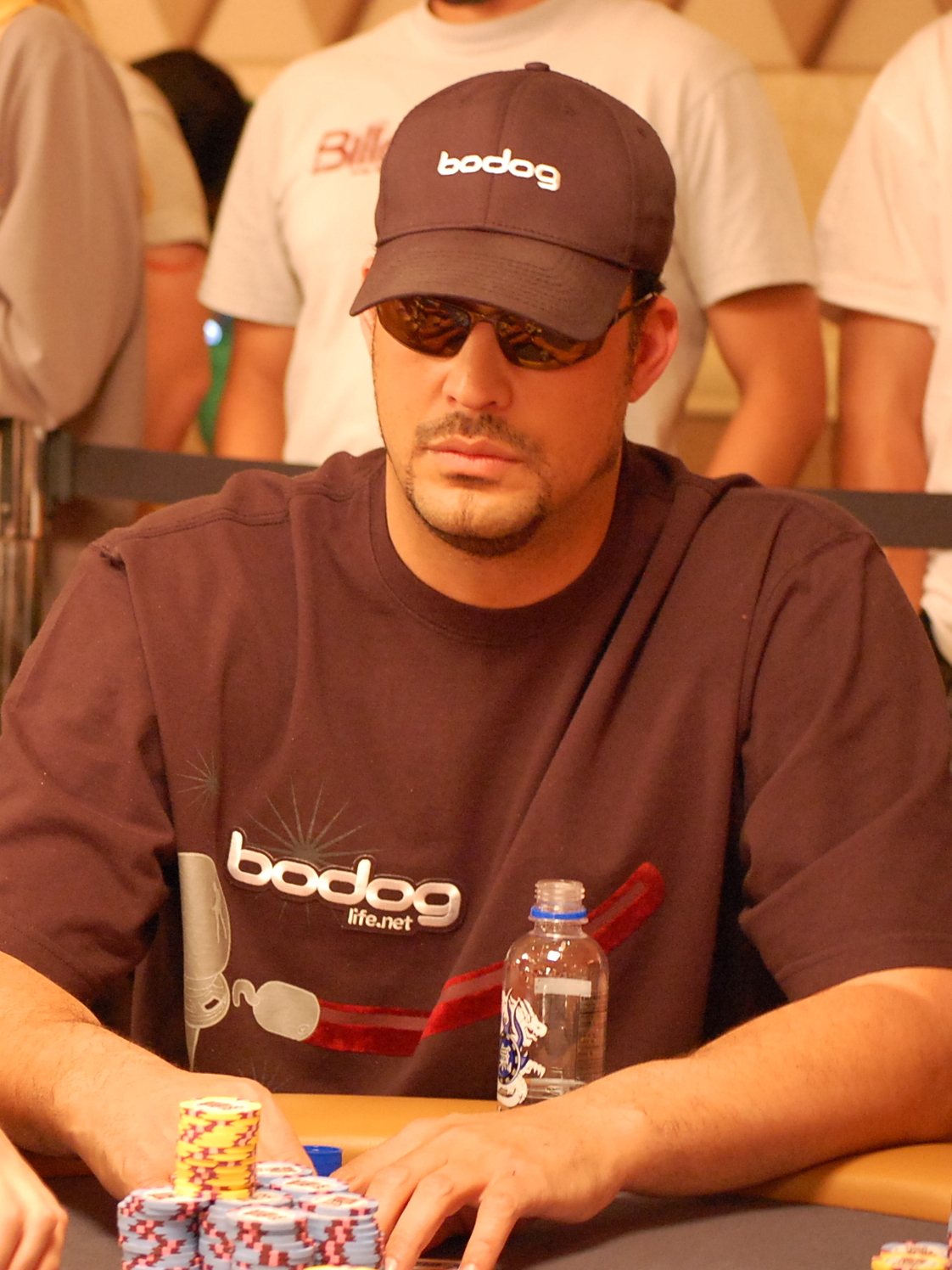
Jean-Robert Bellande, Survivor: China

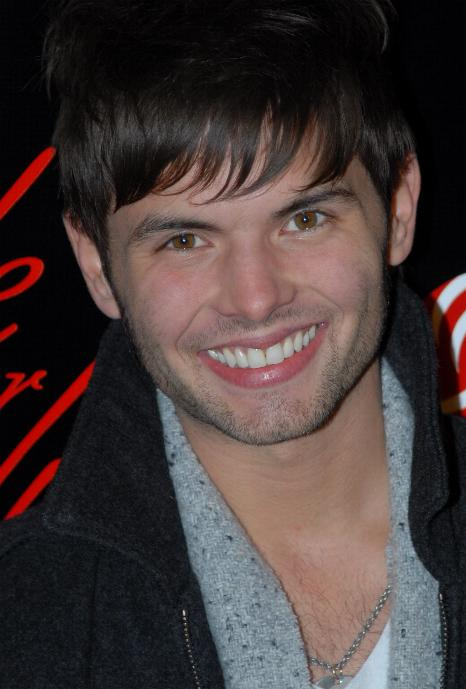
Todd Herzog, Survivor: China

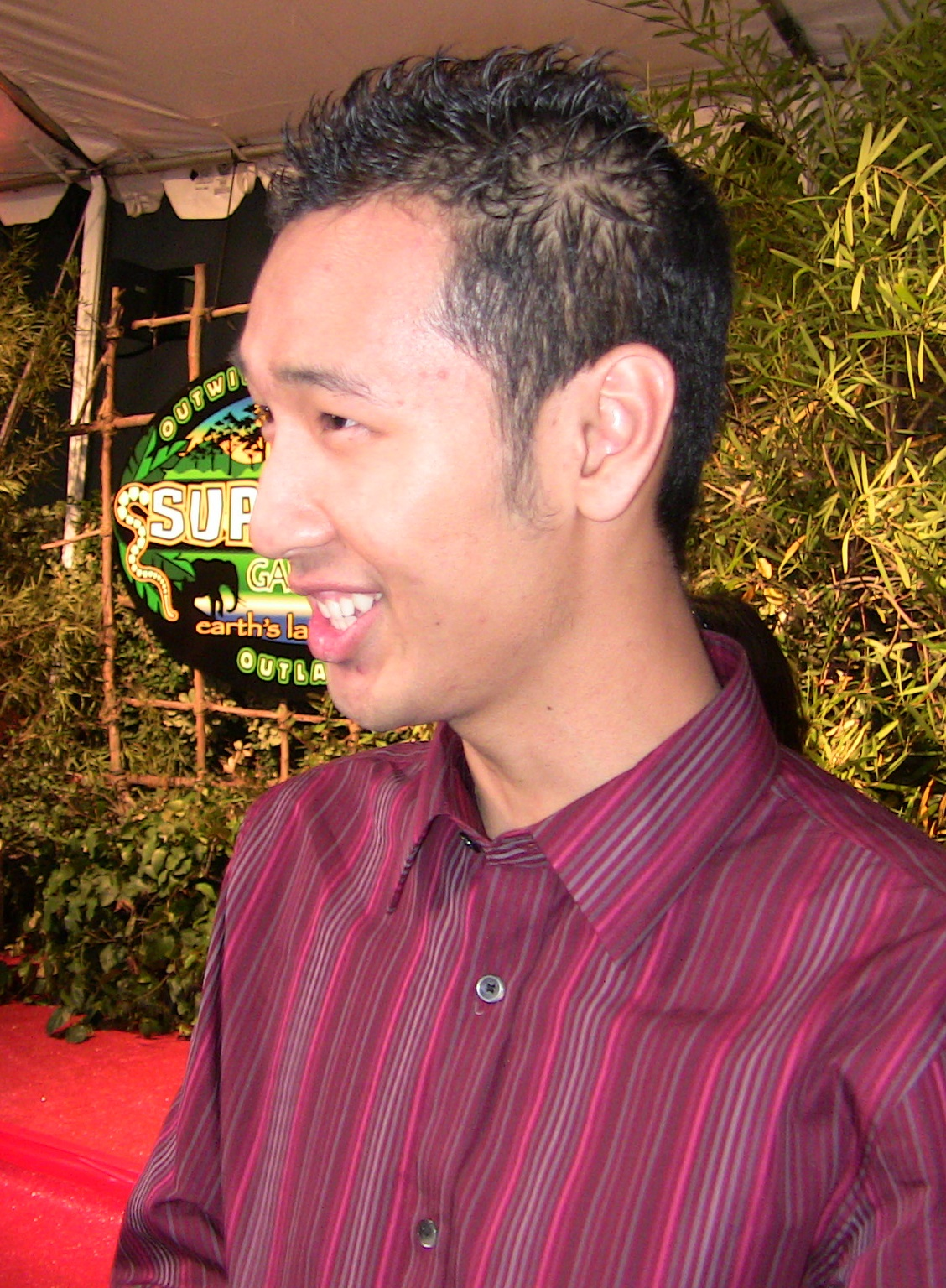
Ken Hoang, Survivor: Gabon

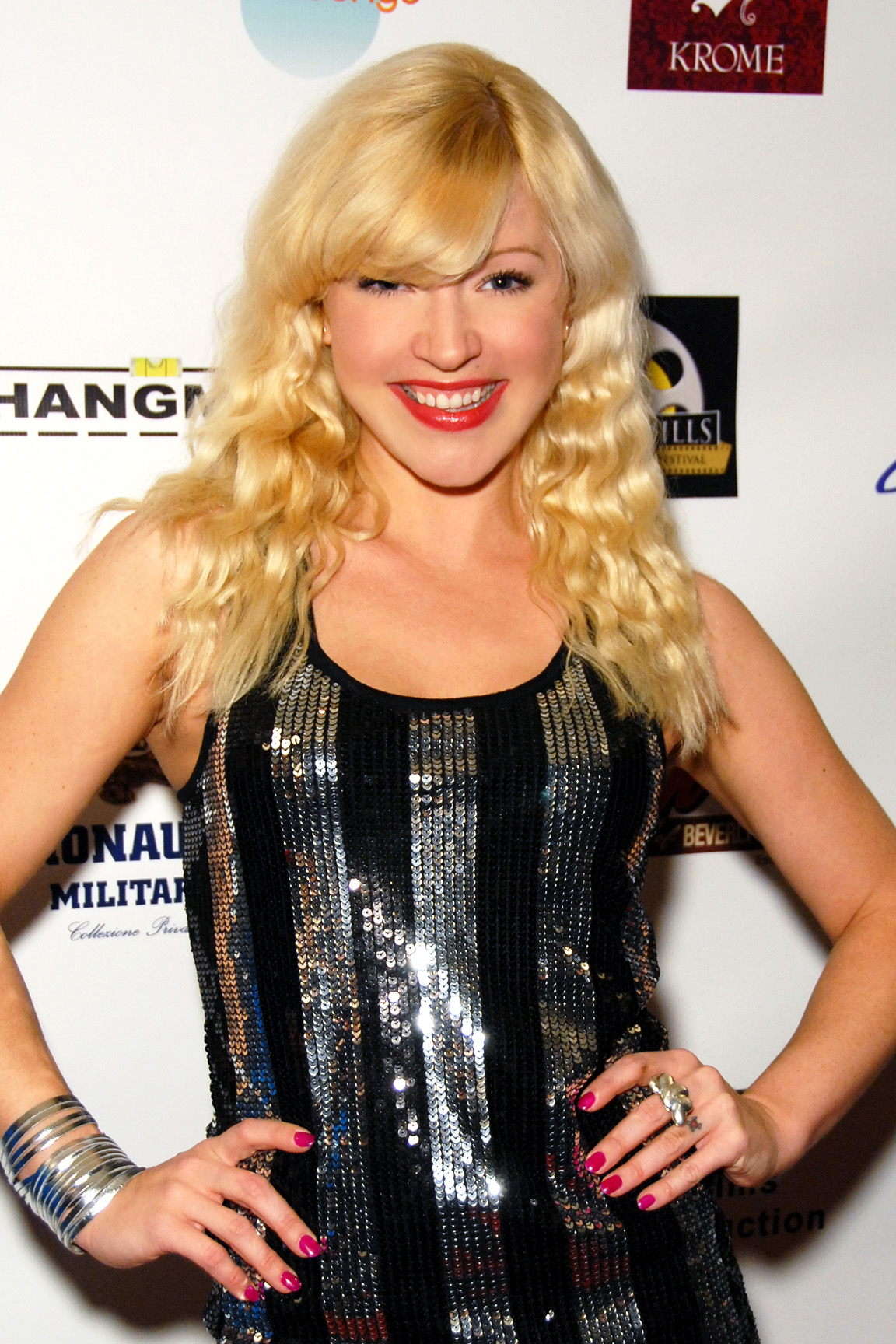
Jessica "Sugar" Kiper, Survivor: Gabon and Survivor: Heroes vs. Villains

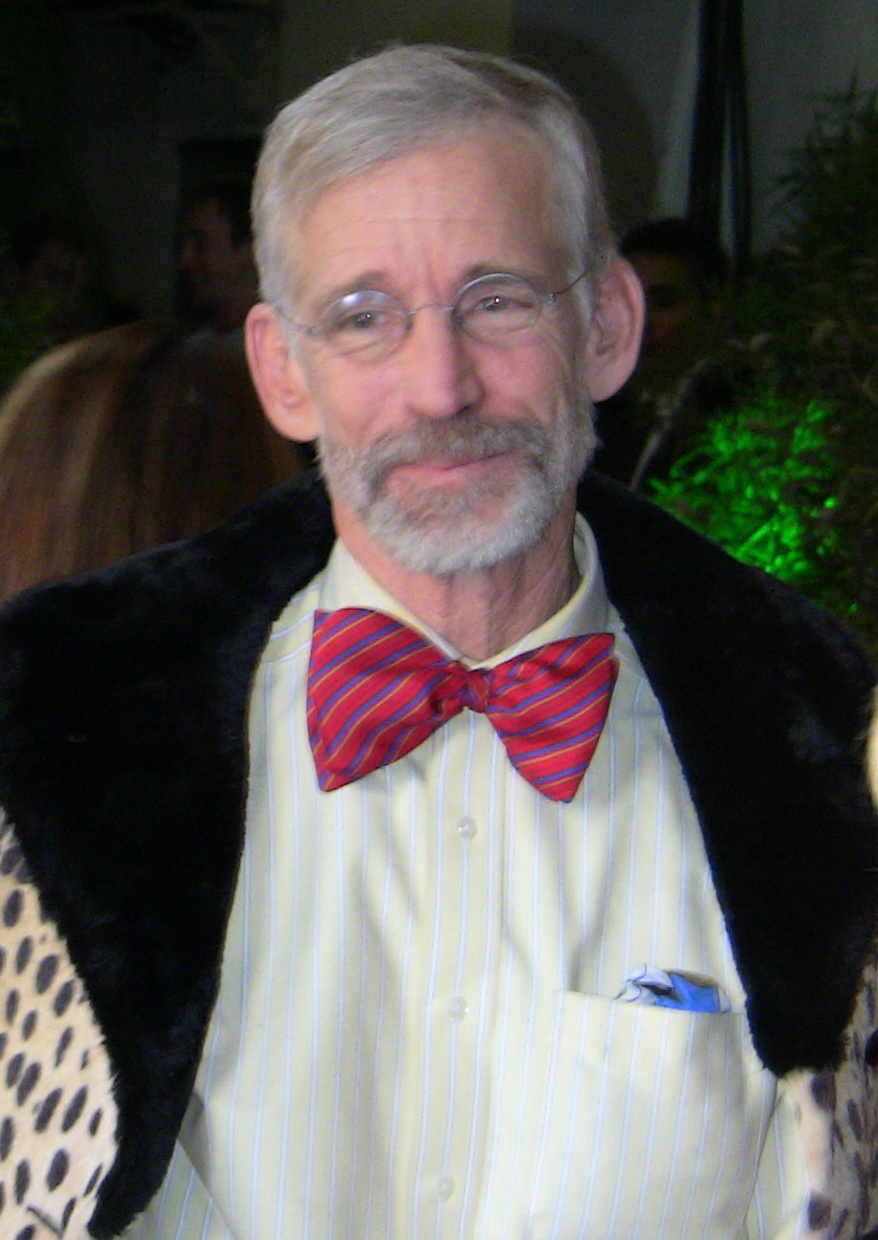
Robert "Bob" Crowley, Survivor: Gabon

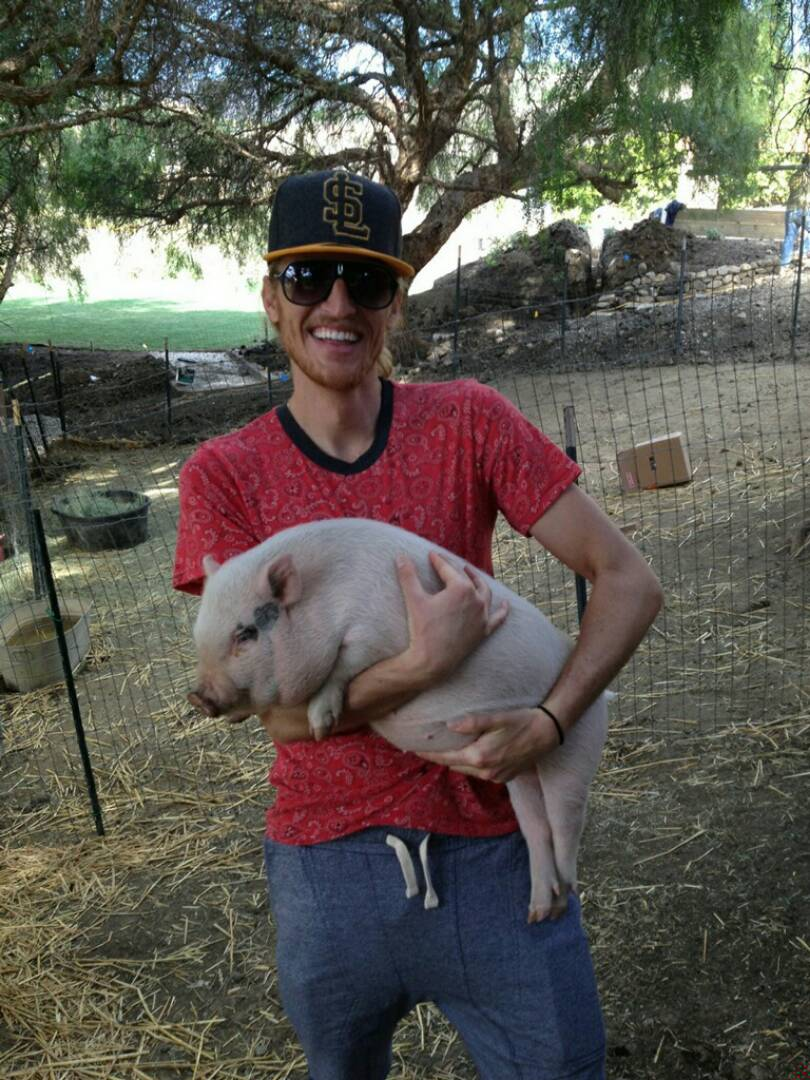
Tyson Apostol, Survivor: Tocantins, Survivor: Heroes vs. Villains, Survivor: Blood vs. Water and Survivor: Winners at War

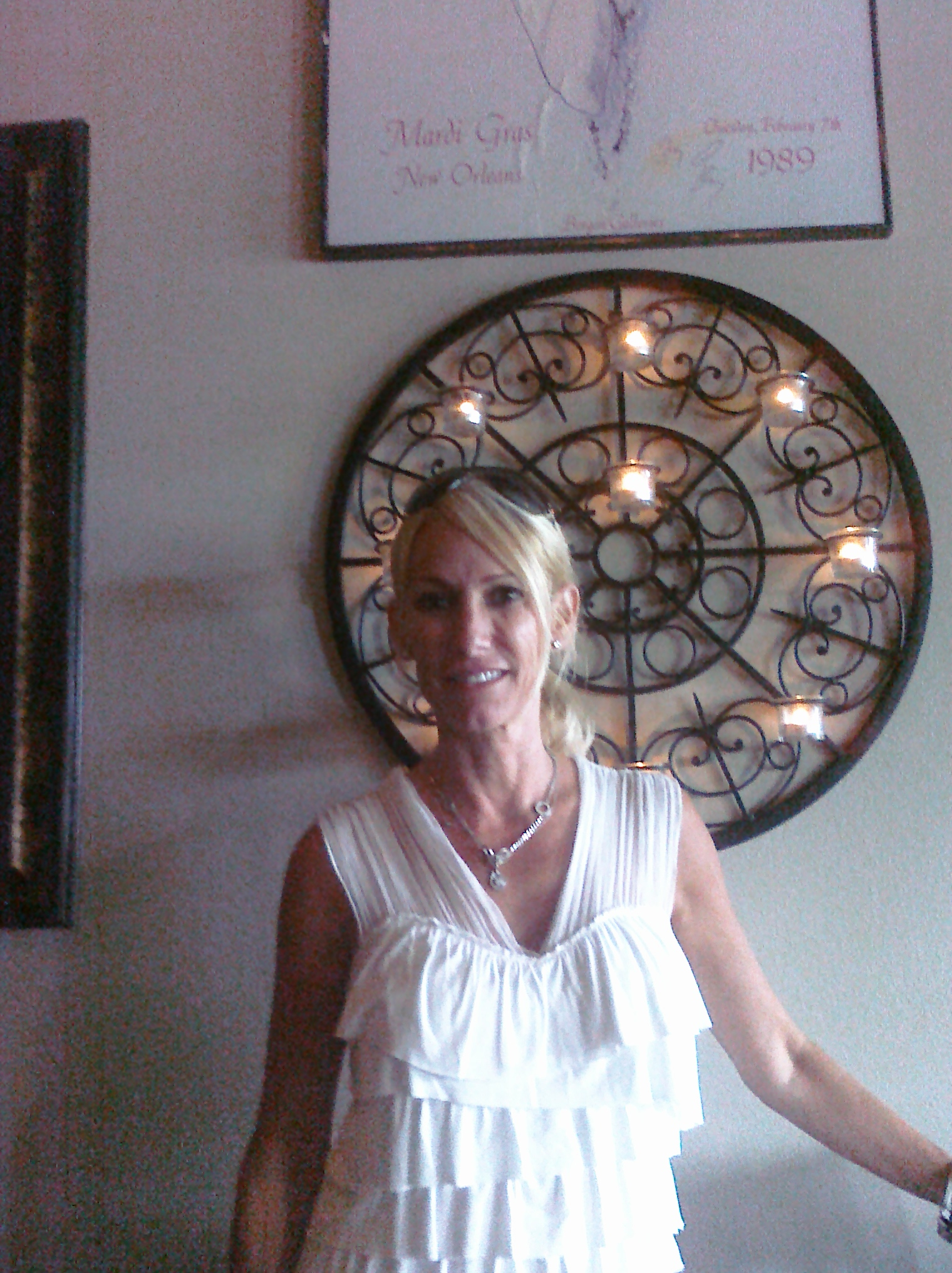
Debra "Debbie" Beebe, Survivor: Tocantins

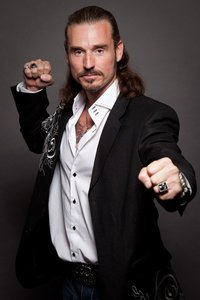
Benjamin "Coach" Wade, Survivor: Tocantins, Survivor: Heroes vs. Villains, Survivor: South Pacific and Survivor 50: In the Hands of the Fans

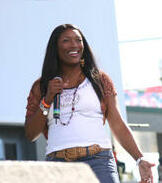
Tamara "Taj" Johnson-George, Survivor: Tocantins

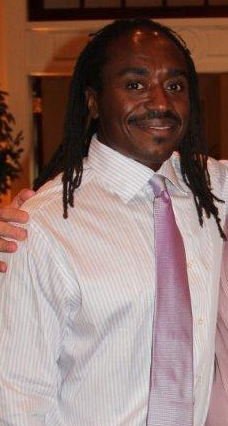
Russell Swan, Survivor: Samoa and Survivor: Philippines

All information is accurate as of the time the season was filmed, and thus may vary from season to season for returning players.

Name	Age	Hometown	Profession	Season	Finish
James "Jim" Lynch	63	Northglenn, CO	Retired Fire Captain	Survivor: Guatemala	18th
Morgan McDevitt	21	Decatur, IL	Magician's Assistant	Survivor: Guatemala	17th
Brianna Varela	21	Edmonds, WA	Retail Salesperson	Survivor: Guatemala	16th
Brooke Struck	26	Hood River, OR	Law Student	Survivor: Guatemala	15th
Blake Towsley	24	Dallas, TX	Real Estate Broker	Survivor: Guatemala	14th
Margaret Bobonich	43	Chardon, OH	Nursing Practitioner	Survivor: Guatemala	13th
Brian Corridan	22	New York, NY	Ivy League Student	Survivor: Guatemala	12th
Amy O'Hara	39	Revere, MA	Police Sergeant	Survivor: Guatemala	11th
Brandon Bellinger	22	Manhattan, KS	Farmer	Survivor: Guatemala	10th
Bobby Jon Drinkard^{^}	27	Troy, AL	Waiter	Survivor: Guatemala	9th
Jamie Newton	24	North Hollywood, CA	Water Skiing Instructor	Survivor: Guatemala	8th
Gary Hogeboom	46	Grand Haven, MI	Former NFL Quarterback	Survivor: Guatemala	7th
Judd Sergeant	34	Ridgefield, NJ	Hotel Doorman	Survivor: Guatemala	6th
Cindy Hall	31	Naples, FL	Zookeeper	Survivor: Guatemala	5th
Lydia Morales	42	Lakewood, WA	Fishmonnger	Survivor: Guatemala	4th
Rafe Judkins	22	Providence, RI	Wilderness Guide	Survivor: Guatemala	3rd
Stephenie LaGrossa^{^}	25	Philadelphia, PA	Pharmaceutical Sales Representative	Survivor: Guatemala	Runner-up
Danielle "Danni" Boatwright	30	Tonganoxie, KS	Sports Radio Host	Survivor: Guatemala	Winner
Tina Scheer	45	Hayward, WI	Lumberjill	Survivor: Panama	16th
Melinda Hyder	32	Sevierville, TN	Singer/Entertainer	Survivor: Panama	15th
Misty Giles	24	Dallas, TX	Missile Engineer	Survivor: Panama	14th
Ruth Marie Milliman	48	Greenville, SC	Property Developer	Survivor: Panama	13th
Bobby Mason	32	Los Angeles, CA	Attorney	Survivor: Panama	12th
Dan Barry	52	South Hadley, MA	Astronaut	Survivor: Panama	11th
Nicholas "Nick" Stanbury	25	Tempe, AZ	Financial Salesman	Survivor: Panama	10th
Austin Carty	24	High Point, NC	Writer	Survivor: Panama	9th
Sally Schumann	27	Chicago, IL	Social Worker	Survivor: Panama	8th
Bruce Kanegai	58	Simi Valley, CA	Art Teacher	Survivor: Panama	7th
Courtney Marit	31	Los Angeles, CA	Fire Dancer	Survivor: Panama	6th
Shane Powers	35	Los Angeles, CA	Marketing Executive	Survivor: Panama	5th
Cirie Fields	34	Walterboro, SC	Nurse	Survivor: Panama	4th
Terry Deitz	46	Simsbury, CT	Pilot	Survivor: Panama	3rd
Danielle DiLorenzo	24	Pompano Beach, FL	Medical Sales Representative	Survivor: Panama	Runner-up
Aras Baskauskas	24	Santa Monica, CA	Yoga Instructor	Survivor: Panama	Winner
Sekou Bunch	46	Los Angeles, CA	Jazz Musician	Survivor: Cook Islands	20th
Virgilio "Billy" Garcia	36	New York, NY	Heavy Metal Musician	Survivor: Cook Islands	19th
Cecilia Mansilla	29	Oakland, CA	Risk Consultant	Survivor: Cook Islands	18th
John Paul "J.P." Calderon	30	Marina Del Rey, CA	Profession Volleyball Player	Survivor: Cook Islands	17th
Stephannie Favor	35	Columbia, SC	Nursing Student	Survivor: Cook Islands	16th
Anh-Tuan "Cao Boi" Bui	42	Christiansburg, VA	Nail Salon Manager	Survivor: Cook Islands	15th
Cristina Coria	35	Los Angeles, CA	Police Officer	Survivor: Cook Islands	14th
Jessica "Flicka" Smith	27	Chico, CA	Roller Girl	Survivor: Cook Islands	13th
Bradley "Brad" Virata	27	Los Angeles, CA	Fashion Director	Survivor: Cook Islands	12th
Rebecca Borman	34	Laurelton, NY	Makeup Artist	Survivor: Cook Islands	11th
Jenny Guzon-Bae	36	Lake Forest, IL	Real Estate Agent	Survivor: Cook Islands	10th
Nathan "Nate" Gonzalez	26	Los Angeles, CA	Shoe Salesman	Survivor: Cook Islands	9th
Candice Woodcock	23	Fayetteville, NC	Pre-Med Student	Survivor: Cook Islands	8th
Jonathan Penner	44	Los Angeles, CA	Writer	Survivor: Cook Islands	7th
Parvati Shallow	24	Los Angeles, CA	Boxer	Survivor: Cook Islands	6th
Adam Gentry	28	San Diego, CA	Copier Sales Executive	Survivor: Cook Islands	5th
Sundra Oakley	31	Los Angeles, CA	Actress	Survivor: Cook Islands	4th
Rebekah "Becky" Lee	28	Washington, D.C.	Attorney	Survivor: Cook Islands	2nd Runner-up
Ozzy Lusth	25	Venice, CA	Waiter	Survivor: Cook Islands	Runner-up
Yul Kwon	31	San Mateo, CA	Management Consultant	Survivor: Cook Islands	Winner
Jessica deBen	27	Los Angeles, CA	Fashion Stylist	Survivor: Fiji	19th
Erica Durousseau	27	Lake Charles, LA	Non-Profit Fundraiser	Survivor: Fiji	18th
Sylvia Kwan	52	Ross, CA	Architect	Survivor: Fiji	17th
Gary Stritesky	55	Ramsey, MN	School Bus Driver	Survivor: Fiji	16th
Liliana Gomez	25	Oxnard, CA	Loan Officer	Survivor: Fiji	15th
Rita Verreos	38	San Antonio, TX	Single Mother	Survivor: Fiji	14th
Anthony Robinson	32	Compton, CA	Expert Witness Locator	Survivor: Fiji	13th
James "Rocky" Reid	28	Los Angeles, CA	Bartender	Survivor: Fiji	12th
Lisette "Lisi" Linares	36	Los Angeles, CA	Customer Service Representative	Survivor: Fiji	11th
Michelle Yi	23	Cincinnati, OH	Student	Survivor: Fiji	10th
Edgardo Rivera	28	Miami Beach, FL	Advertising Executive	Survivor: Fiji	9th
Mookie Lee	25	Chicago, IL	Business Consultant	Survivor: Fiji	8th
Alejandro "Alex" Angarita	28	Los Angeles, CA	Attorney	Survivor: Fiji	7th
Stacy Kimball	27	Boulder, CO	Web Producer	Survivor: Fiji	6th
Kenward "Boo" Bernis	34	Lafayette, LA	Construction Worker	Survivor: Fiji	5th
Yau-Man Chan	54	Martinez, CA	Internet Technology Director	Survivor: Fiji	4th
Cassandra Franklin	42	Los Angeles, CA	College Administrator	Survivor: Fiji	Co-runner up
Andria "Dreamz" Herd	25	Wilmington, NC	Cheerleading Coach	Survivor: Fiji	Co-runner up
Earl Cole	35	Santa Monica, CA	Advertising Executive	Survivor: Fiji	Winner
Steve "Chicken" Morris	47	Marion, VA	Chicken Farmer	Survivor: China	16th
Ashley Massaro	28	East Northport, NY	Professional Wrestler	Survivor: China	15th
Leslie Nease	38	Tega Cay, SC	Christian Radio Host	Survivor: China	14th
Dave Cruser	37	Simi Valley, CA	Former Model	Survivor: China	13th
Aaron Reisberger	32	Venice, CA	Surfing Instructor	Survivor: China	12th
Sherea Lloyd	26	Atlanta, GA	Elementary Teacher	Survivor: China	11th
Jaime Dugan	22	Columbia, SC	Student	Survivor: China	10th
Jean-Robert Bellande	36	Las Vegas, NV	Profession Poker Player	Survivor: China	9th
Michael "Frosti" Zernow	20	Chicago, IL	Student/Athlete	Survivor: China	8th
James Clement	30	Lafayette, LA	Gravedigger	Survivor: China	7th
Erik Huffman	26	Nashville, TN	Musician	Survivor: China	6th
Peih-Gee Law	29	Marina Del Rey, CA	Jeweler	Survivor: China	5th
Denise Martin	40	Douglas, MA	School Lunch Lady	Survivor: China	4th
Amanda Kimmel	23	Kalispell, MT	Hiking Guide	Survivor: China	2nd Runner-up
Courtney Yates	26	New York, NY	Waitress	Survivor: China	Runner-up
Todd Herzog	22	Pleasant Grove, UT	Flight Attendant	Survivor: China	Winner
Jon "Jonny Fairplay" Dalton^{^}	33	Danville, VA	Art Consultant	Survivor: Micronesia	20th
Mary Sartain	29	Emeryville, CA	Real Estate Manager	Survivor: Micronesia	19th
Yau-Man Chan^{^}	55	Martinez, CA	Internet Technology Director	Survivor: Micronesia	18th
Michael "Mikey B" Bortone	34	Los Angeles, CA	Aspiring Writer	Survivor: Micronesia	17th
Joel Anderson	32	Avondale, AZ	Firefighter	Survivor: Micronesia	16th
Jonathan Penner^{^}	45	Los Angeles, CA	Writer	Survivor: Micronesia	15th
Chet Welch	48	Ford City, PA	Pageant Coach	Survivor: Micronesia	14th
Kathleen "Kathy" Sleckman	45	Glen Ellyn, IL	Golf Course Vendor	Survivor: Micronesia	13th
Tracy Hughes-Wolf	43	Fredericksburg, VA	Residential Builder	Survivor: Micronesia	12th
Ami Cusack^{^}	34	Golden, CO	Nanny	Survivor: Micronesia	11th
Eliza Orlins^{^}	25	New York, NY	Law School Student	Survivor: Micronesia	10th
Ozzy Lusth^{^}	26	Venice, CA	Photographer	Survivor: Micronesia	9th
Jason Siska	22	Fox River Grove, IL	Gymnastics Coach	Survivor: Micronesia	8th
James Clement^{^}	30	Lafayette, LA	Gravedigger	Survivor: Micronesia	7th
Alexis Jones	24	Beverly Hills, CA	Motivational Speaker	Survivor: Micronesia	6th
Erik Reichenbach	22	Pinckney, MI	Ice Cream Scooper	Survivor: Micronesia	5th
Natalie Bolton	32	Los Angeles, CA	Personal Trainer	Survivor: Micronesia	4th
Cirie Fields^{^}	37	Norwalk, CT	Nurse	Survivor: Micronesia	3rd
Amanda Kimmel^{^}	23	Los Angeles, CA	Aspiring Designer	Survivor: Micronesia	Runner-up
Parvati Shallow^{^}	25	Los Angeles, CA	Charity Organizer	Survivor: Micronesia	Winner
Michelle Chase	24	Los Angeles, CA	Music Producer	Survivor: Gabon	18th
Gillian Larson	61	Temecula, CA	Retired Nurse	Survivor: Gabon	17th
Paloma Soto-Castillo	24	Downey, CA	Student	Survivor: Gabon	16th
Jacquie Berg	25	Santa Barbara, CA	Medical Saleswoman	Survivor: Gabon	15th
Danny "GC" Brown	26	Portland, OR	Maintenance Man	Survivor: Gabon	14th
Kelly Czarnecki	22	Buffalo Grove, IL	Retail Saleswoman	Survivor: Gabon	13th
Ace Gordon	27	Naples, FL	Jewelry Salesman/Photographer	Survivor: Gabon	12th
Dan Kay	32	Boston, MA	Attorney	Survivor: Gabon	11th
Marcus Lehman	28	Atlanta, GA	Doctor	Survivor: Gabon	10th
Charlie Herschel	29	New York, NY	Attorney	Survivor: Gabon	9th
Randy Bailey	49	Eagle Rock, MO	Wedding Videographer	Survivor: Gabon	8th
Corinne Kaplan	29	Los Angeles, CA	Pharmaceutical Saleswoman	Survivor: Gabon	7th
Crystal Cox	29	Durham, NC	Olympic Gold Medalist	Survivor: Gabon	6th
Ken Hoang	22	Westminster, CA	Professional Gamer	Survivor: Gabon	5th
Matty Whitmore	29	Pacific Palisades, CA	Personal Trainer	Survivor: Gabon	4th
Jessica "Sugar" Kiper	29	Brooklyn, NY	Pin-Up Model	Survivor: Gabon	2nd Runner-up
Jesusita "Susie" Smith	47	Charles City, IA	Hairdresser	Survivor: Gabon	Runner-up
Robert "Bob" Crowley	57	Portland, ME	Physics Teacher	Survivor: Gabon	Winner
Carolina Eastwood	26	West Hollywood, CA	Bartender	Survivor: Tocantins	16th
Candace Smith	31	Dayton, OH	Attorney	Survivor: Tocantins	15th
Jerry Sims	49	Rock Hill, SC	U.S. Army Sergeant	Survivor: Tocantins	14th
Sandy Burgin	53	Louisville, KY	Bus Driver	Survivor: Tocantins	13th
Spencer Duhm	19	Lakeland, FL	Student	Survivor: Tocantins	12th
Sydney Wheeler	24	Raleigh, NC	Model	Survivor: Tocantins	11th
Joe Dowdle	26	Austin, TX	Real Estate Salesman	Survivor: Tocantins	10th
Brendan Synnott	30	New York, NY	Entrepreneur	Survivor: Tocantins	9th
Tyson Apostol	29	Lindon, UT	Professional Cyclist	Survivor: Tocantins	8th
Sierra Reed	23	Los Angeles, CA	Model	Survivor: Tocantins	7th
Debra "Debbie" Beebe	46	Auburn, AL	School Principal	Survivor: Tocantins	6th
Benjamin "Coach" Wade	37	Bolivar, MO	Soccer Coach/Musician	Survivor: Tocantins	5th
Tamara "Taj" Johnson-George	37	Nashville, TN	Former Pop Star	Survivor: Tocantins	4th
Erinn Lobdell	26	Waukesha, WI	Hairdresser	Survivor: Tocantins	3rd
Stephen Fishbach	29	New York, NY	Corporate Consultant	Survivor: Tocantins	Runner-up
James "J.T." Thomas, Jr.	24	Samson, AL	Cattle Rancher	Survivor: Tocantins	Winner
Marisa Calihan	26	Cincinnati, OH	Student	Survivor: Samoa	20th
Mike Borassi	62	Marina del Rey, CA	Personal Chef	Survivor: Samoa	19th
Betsy Bolan	48	Campton, NH	Police Officer	Survivor: Samoa	18th
Ben Browning	28	Los Angeles, CA	Bar Manager	Survivor: Samoa	17th
Yasmin Giles	33	Los Angeles, CA	Hairstylist	Survivor: Samoa	16th
Ashley Trainer	22	Maple Grove, MN	Spa Saleswoman	Survivor: Samoa	15th
Russell Swan	42	Glenside, PA	Attorney	Survivor: Samoa	14th
Elizabeth "Liz" Kim	33	New York, NY	Urban Planner	Survivor: Samoa	13th
Erik Cardona	28	Ontario, CA	Bartender	Survivor: Samoa	12th
Kelly Sharbaugh	25	Los Angeles, CA	Hairstylist	Survivor: Samoa	11th
Laura Morett	39	Salem, OR	Office Manager	Survivor: Samoa	10th
John Fincher	25	Los Angeles, CA	Rocket Scientist	Survivor: Samoa	9th
Dave Ball	38	Los Angeles, CA	Fitness Instructor	Survivor: Samoa	8th
Monica Padilla	25	San Diego, CA	Law Student	Survivor: Samoa	7th
Shannon "Shambo" Waters	45	Renton, WA	Saleswoman	Survivor: Samoa	6th
Jaison Robinson	28	Chicago, IL	Law Student	Survivor: Samoa	5th
Brett Clouser	23	Los Angeles, CA	T-shirt Designer	Survivor: Samoa	4th
Mick Trimming	33	Los Angeles, CA	Doctor	Survivor: Samoa	2nd Runner-up
Russell Hantz	36	Dayton, TX	Oil Company Owner	Survivor: Samoa	Runner-up
Natalie White	26	Van Buren, AR	Pharmaceutical Saleswoman	Survivor: Samoa	Winner
Jessica "Sugar" Kiper^{^}	30	Los Angeles, CA	Pin-Up Model	Survivor: Heroes vs. Villains	20th
Stephenie LaGrossa^{◊}	29	Philadelphia, PA	Pharmaceutical Sales Representative	Survivor: Heroes vs. Villains	19th
Randy Bailey^{^}	50	Eagle Rock, MO	Wedding Videographer	Survivor: Heroes vs. Villains	18th
Cirie Fields^{◊}	39	Norwalk, CT	Nurse	Survivor: Heroes vs. Villains	17th
Tom Westman^{^}	45	Sayville, NY	Motivational Speaker	Survivor: Heroes vs. Villains	16th
Tyson Apostol^{^}	29	Lindon, UT	Former Professional Cyclist	Survivor: Heroes vs. Villains	15th
James Clement^{◊}	32	Lafayette, LA	Gravedigger	Survivor: Heroes vs. Villains	14th
Rob Mariano^{◊}	33	Pensacola, FL	Construction Worker	Survivor: Heroes vs. Villains	13th
Benjamin "Coach" Wade^{^}	38	Los Angeles, CA	Soccer Coach/Musician	Survivor: Heroes vs. Villains	12th
Courtney Yates^{^}	29	New York, NY	Waitress	Survivor: Heroes vs. Villains	11th
James "J.T." Thomas, Jr.^{^}	25	Samson, AL	Cattle Rancher	Survivor: Heroes vs. Villains	10th
Amanda Kimmel^{◊}	25	Los Angeles, CA	Aspiring Designer	Survivor: Heroes vs. Villains	9th
Candice Woodcock^{^}	27	Washington, DC	Physician	Survivor: Heroes vs. Villains	8th
Danielle DiLorenzo^{^}	28	Pompano Beach, FL	Medical Sales Representative	Survivor: Heroes vs. Villains	7th
Rupert Boneham^{◊}	45	Indianapolis, IN	Troubled Teens Mentor	Survivor: Heroes vs. Villains	6th
Colby Donaldson^{◊}	35	Dallas, TX	Actor	Survivor: Heroes vs. Villains	5th
Jerri Manthey^{◊}	38	Los Angeles, CA	Actress	Survivor: Heroes vs. Villains	4th
Russell Hantz^{^}	36	Dayton, TX	Oil Company Owner	Survivor: Heroes vs. Villains	2nd Runner-up
Parvati Shallow^{◊}	27	Los Angeles, CA	Charity Organizer	Survivor: Heroes vs. Villains	Runner-up
Sandra Diaz-Twine^{^}	35	Fayetteville, NC	Office Assistant	Survivor: Heroes vs. Villains	Winner
