= Rich Valley, Virginia =

Coordinates: 36°34′08″N 81°37′34″W

Rich Valley is a rural area in Smyth County, Virginia, United States, located near the incorporated town of Saltville.

== Rich Valley Presbyterian Church ==
Rich Valley Presbyterian Church is a very small church that dots the countryside. History 175 Years of Worship

Rich Valley Presbyterian Church was organized as Mount Pleasant Presbyterian Church in 1836. The organizing pastor was Rev. Alexander McCluer. The first two elders were Matthew Buchanan and John Buchanan.

The first building was made of hewed logs and was located on the approximate site of today's Mount Pleasant United Methodist Church. In 1848 Franklin Grayson drafted a deed to the land on which the church stands today. The present building was constructed in 1858, along with the manse. The brick used in the building was made from local clay and local craftsmen fired the bricks in a kiln near the site. The current manse resides in the same location of the past home. The above photograph¹ was taken around 1880.

The new church was named Pleasant Grove, perhaps for all the beautiful oak trees that are still with us today. In 1871, by order of the Presbytery, the name was changed to Rich Valley Presbyterian Church. From this church, both the Locust Cove and Chatham Hill Churches were organized.

The building was remodeled around the turn of the century. The present pews were purchased in 1905. The present manse was built around 1924. The Sunday School rooms, the kitchen, and fellowship hall were built in the early 60's and dedicated on September 2, 1962.

Front view of Rich Valley Presbyterian Church

Rich Valley Presbyterian Church - Date Posted to Right of Door

View of Valley with Church in distance

Rich Valley Cemetery Plot
