= Sarah Jones =

Sarah or Sara Jones may refer to:

- Sarah Jones (academic), British journalist and academic also known as Sarah Moore
- Sarah Jones (American journalist) (born 1985)
- Sarah Jones (artist) (born 1959), London-based artist
- Sarah Jones (multi-instrumentalist) (born 1960)
- Sarah Jones (Australian journalist) (born 1982), Australian television presenter and sportscaster
- Sarah Jones (author), British author and speaker
- Sarah Jones (drummer) (born 1985), drummer for Harry Styles, NYPC and Hot Chip
- Sarah Jones (field hockey) (born 1990), Welsh hockey player
- Sarah Jones (freestyle wrestler) (born 1983), Scottish athlete
- Sarah Jones (politician) (born 1972), British member of parliament
- Sarah Jones (minister) (fl. 21st century), British minister in the Church in Wales
- Sarah Jones (screen actress) (born 1983), American screen actress from Ugly Betty, Big Love and Alcatraz
- Sarah Jones (stage actress), American stage actress, activist and poet
- Sarah Jones (rower) (born 1973), American rower
- Sarah Garland Boyd Jones (1866–1905), African-American physician
- Sarah Rees Jones (born 1957), British historian
- Sarah Rowland Jones (born 1959), Welsh Anglican priest
- Sarah Gibson Jones (1843–1938), African American educator, journalist, poet, and clubwoman
- Sarah Van Hoosen Jones (1892–1972), the first woman in the United States to earn a doctorate in animal genetics
- Sarah Wales Jones Burton (1791–1872), née Jones, American society hostess, served as First Lady of North Carolina
- Saran Kaba Jones (born 1982), Liberian government official and social entrepreneur
- Sara Roddis Jones (1909–1975), American clubwoman, president general of the Daughters of the American Revolution
- Sarah Patricia Jones (born 1934), full name of British salsa dancer Paddy Jones
- Sarah Jones (1986–2014), camera assistant killed on the set of the unfinished film Midnight Rider inspiring the Safety for Sarah movement
- Sarah L. Jones, pseudonym of the English author Catherine Cooper Hopley (1817–1911)
- Sarah Jones, professional cheerleader, most notable for bringing a defamation suit; Jones v. Dirty World Entertainment Recordings LLC
- Sarah Jones, reality contestant from Survivor: Marquesas
- Sarah Jones, character in Fireman Sam
