= Tankie =

Pejorative term for authoritarian communists

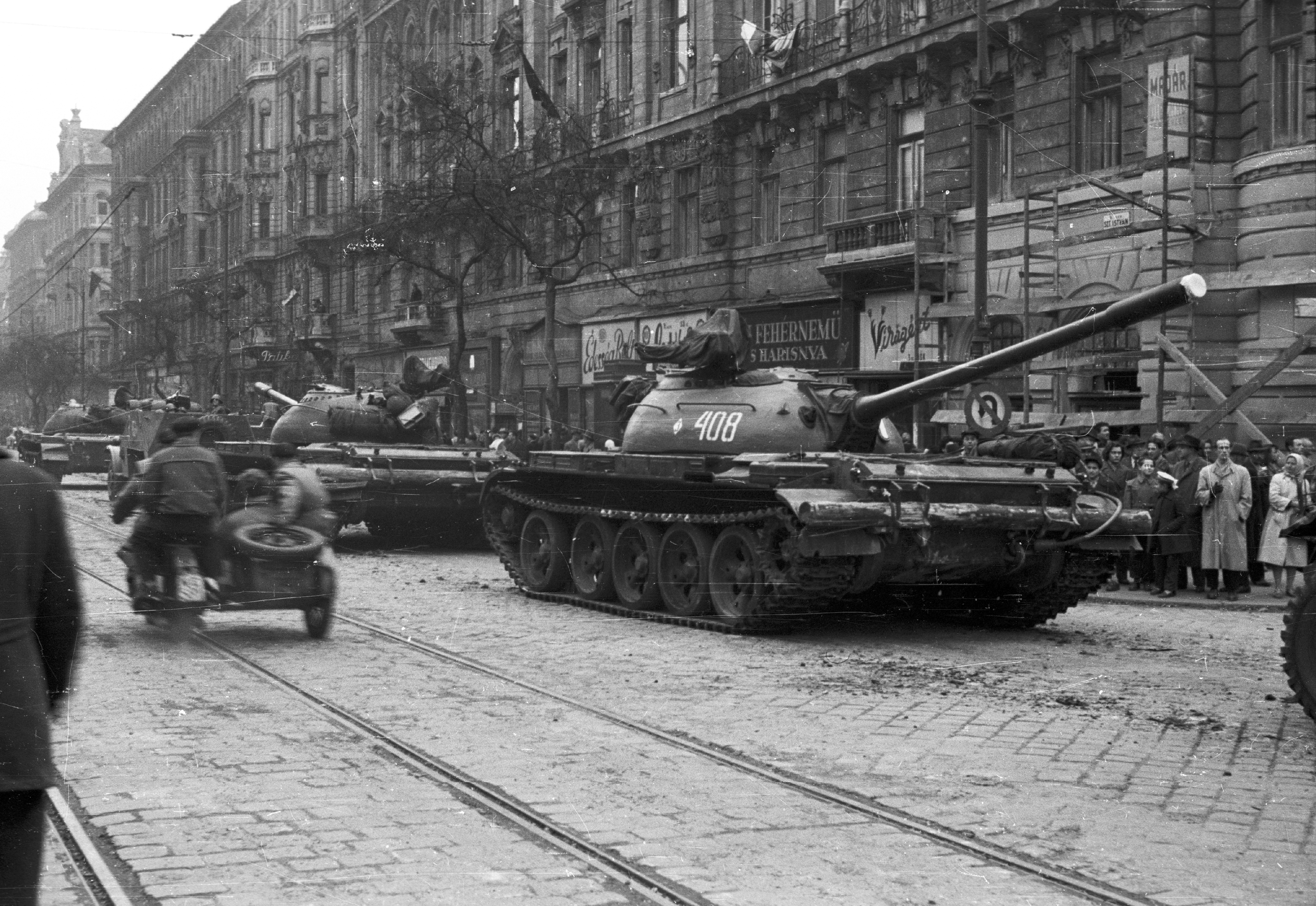
T-54 tanks of the Soviet Army were deployed in response to the Hungarian Revolution of 1956, from which the term tankie originated.

Tankie is a pejorative label generally applied to authoritarian communists, especially those who support or defend acts of repression by such regimes, their allies, or deny the occurrence of the events thereof. More specifically, the term has been applied to those who express support for Communist states, whether contemporary or historical. It has a history of being used by some anti-authoritarian leftists, anarchists, democratic socialists, and reformists to denounce Stalinism, although the term has seen increasing use by liberal and right‐wing factions as well.

The term tankie was originally used by dissident Marxist–Leninists to describe members of the Communist Party of Great Britain (CPGB) who followed the party line of the Communist Party of the Soviet Union (CPSU). Specifically, it was used to distinguish party members who spoke out in defence of the Soviet use of tanks to suppress the Hungarian Revolution of 1956 and the 1968 Prague Spring, or who more broadly adhered to pro-Soviet positions. The term has been extended to describe people who endorse, defend, or deny the actions of communist leaders such as Joseph Stalin and Mao Zedong. In recent times, the term has been used across the political spectrum and in a geopolitical context to accuse individuals of having a bias in favour of current anti-Western authoritarian states; Belarus, Cuba, China, Iran, Nicaragua, North Korea, Russia, the Alliance of Sahel States, and Houthi-controlled Yemen serve as prevalent examples.

== History and usage ==
=== In the United Kingdom ===
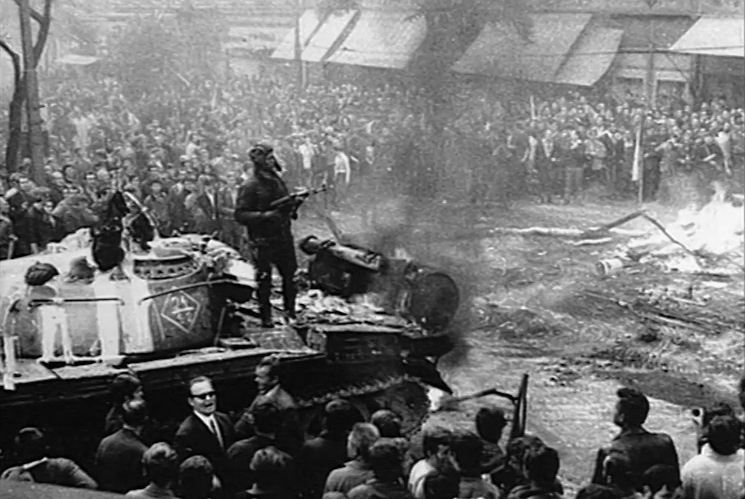
In 1968, Soviet tanks invaded Czechoslovakia to suppress liberalisation efforts by the government.

Tankie originated in the UK as a term for hardline members of the Communist Party of Great Britain (CPGB) who continued to pledge support for the Soviet Union even when doubts had begun to emerge elsewhere in the party. According to historian Christina Petterson, "Politically speaking, tankies regard past and current socialist systems as legitimate attempts at creating communism, and thus have not distanced themselves from Stalin, China, etc." This Stalinist or "tankie" wing of the CPGB was associated with the views of the strong CPGB presence in British trade unions. Journalist Peter Paterson asked the Amalgamated Engineering Union official Reg Birch about his election to the CPGB Executive after the Soviet invasion of Hungary in 1956. Paterson recalled:

When I asked him how he could possibly have sided with the tankies, so called because of the use of Russian tanks to quell the revolt, he said "They wanted a trade unionist who could stomach Hungary, and I fitted the bill." (Note: Reg Birch's hardline attitudes later led him to split away from the CPGB to form a pro-Albanian Maoist party.)

The support for the invasion of Hungary was disastrous for the party's reputation in Britain. The CPGB made mild criticisms of the Soviet invasion of Czechoslovakia in 1968, which they still justified as a necessary intervention, although a hardline faction actively supported it, including the Appeal Group who left the party in response.

After the Prague Spring, the term was used to describe Communist party members of Western countries who had supported the invasion of Czechoslovakia by Warsaw Pact states, of which Czechoslovakia was a member. It was also used in the 1980s to describe the uncritical support the Morning Star gave to the Soviet intervention in Afghanistan. By that time, the party was split between the reform-minded eurocommunist wing of the CPGB and the traditionalist, pro-Soviet group; the latter continued to be labelled tankies, which led to much of the internal politics of the CPGB being viewed along the lines of "tankies versus 'Euros'".

The term is sometimes used within the Labour Party as slang for a politically old-fashioned leftist. Alastair Campbell reported a conversation about modernising education, in which Tony Blair said: "I'm with George Walden on selection." Campbell recalled: "DM [David Miliband] looked aghast ... [Blair] said when it came to education, DM and I were just a couple of old tankies." In 2015, Boris Johnson referred to Jeremy Corbyn and the left wing of the Labour Party as "tankies and trots", the latter referring to Trotskyism.

In the 2006 play Rock 'n' Roll by the Anglo-Czech author Tom Stoppard, the character Max, based on Eric Hobsbawm, discusses with Stephen what to read to hear what is happening in the communist party, after the fall of the Berlin Wall and collapse of communist regimes in Eastern Europe. Their options are Marxism Today and the daily newspaper, the Morning Star:

MAX: Marxism Today? It's not so much the Eurocommunism. In the end it was the mail order gifts thing. I couldn't take the socks with little hammers and sickles on them.

STEPHEN: Well, Read the Morning Star and keep up with the Tankies.

MAX: The Tankies ... How the years roll by. Dubcek is back. Russia agrees to withdraw its garrisons. Czechoslovakia takes her knickers off for capitalism. And all that remains of August '68 is a derisive nickname for the only real communists left in the Communist Party.

=== Modern internet uses ===
By 2017, tankie had re-emerged as pejorative internet slang for supporters of authoritarian socialism, and it became particularly popular among young democratic socialists. Left-wing writer Carl Beijer argued that there were two distinct uses of the term tankie. The original one described someone who supports Stalinist foreign policy or more generally, "who tends to support militant opposition to capitalism". The more modern online use of it often means "something like 'a self-proclaimed communist who indulges in conspiracy theories and whose rhetoric is largely performative.'" He was critical of both uses. The Intercept journalist Roane Carey identified the "key element in the tankie mindset [as] the simple-minded assumption that only the United States can be imperialist, and thus any country that opposes the U.S. must be supported."

While generally used pejoratively, some Marxist–Leninists have re-appropriated it and used the term as a badge of honour. According to Brian Hioe of the left-wing New Bloom Magazine, some Anglophone members of the Chinese diaspora who seek radical responses to social ills such as xenophobia against Asians are drawn to tankie discourse. This form of tankie ideology has also been described by Hioe as "diasporic Chinese nationalism". An instance of the modern usage is the description of those "who instinctively defend China based on the idea that it is an example of actually existing socialism resisting Western imperialism", in discussions around the persecution of Uyghurs in China and who justify the "anti-terrorism" operations of the Chinese government.

In 2022, Sarah Jones of New York magazine reported that in the U.S. "So-called tankies don't make up the majority of Democratic Socialists of America (DSA) membership or wield much power within the broader left, but they do exist", and that "leftists from other countries have been contending with the American tankie for years", quoting activists from Hong Kong and Poland. The term tankie has also been used in contemporary times to describe the defenders of anti-American leaders like former Syrian President Bashar al-Assad or those who propagate pro-Russian narratives in the context of the Russo-Ukrainian War. It has been applied to "elements within the self-identified [American] left that have soft-pedalled Russia's aggressive foreign policy and history of human rights abuses", according to Jones.

== See also ==
- Anti-Americanism
- Brezhnev Doctrine
- Campism
- GenZedong
- Islamo-leftism
- Little Pink
- Moskal
- Pinko
- Putinversteher
- Red fascism
- Regressive left
- Soviet imperialism
- Taistoism
- Tank Man
- Ulusalism
- Useful idiot
- Vatnik (slang)
- Whataboutism
- Shahbagi
