= Tammy Leitner =

American journalist and reality TV show contestant (born 1972)

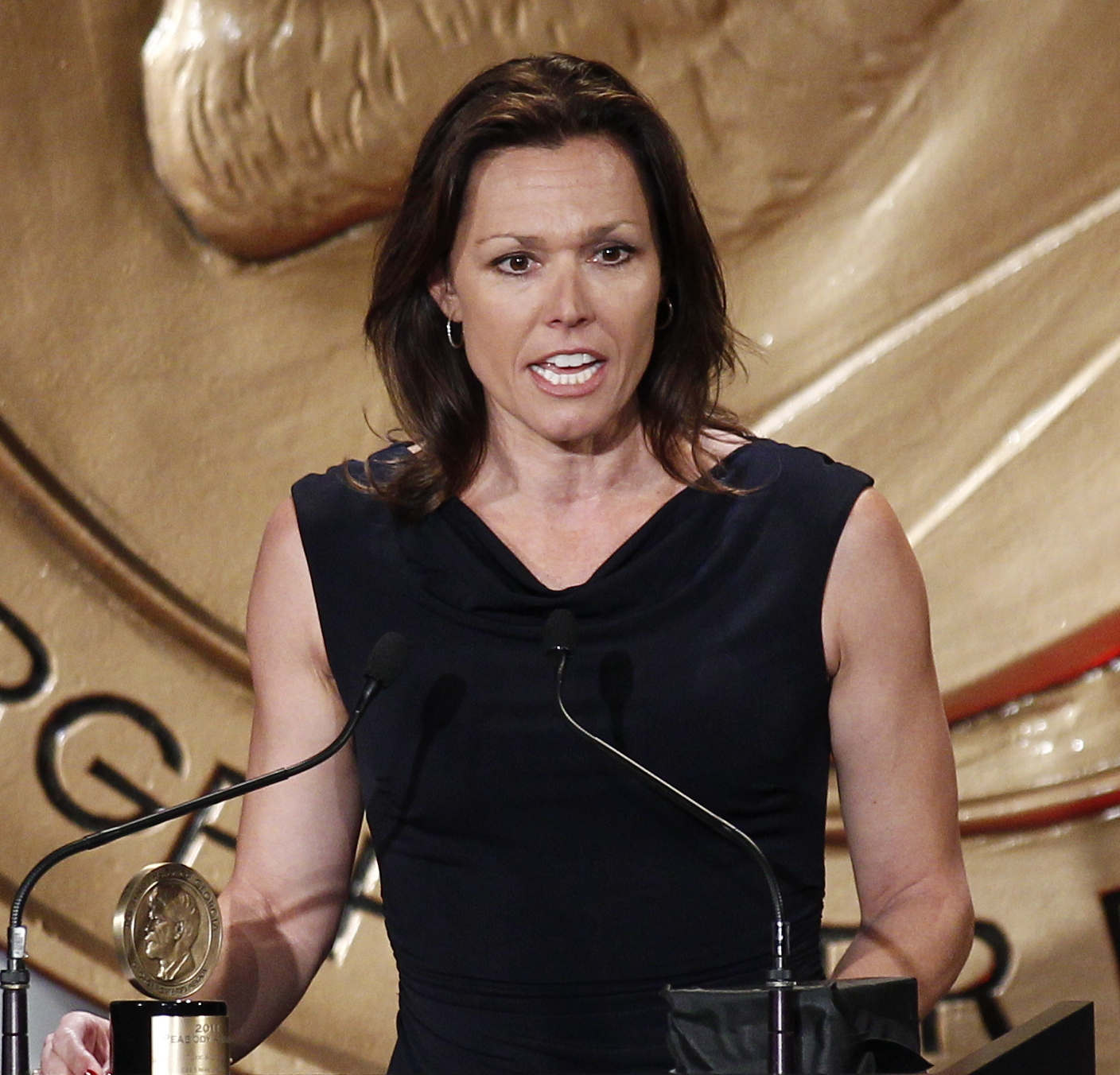
- Leitner accepting the Peabody Award in 2012
- Born: July 3, 1972 (age 54); San Diego, California, U.S.
- Occupations: Network Correspondent, Investigative Journalist, Documentarian
- Notable credit(s): NBC Nightly News, The Today Show, MSNBC

Tamara Leitner (born July 3, 1972) is an American network correspondent and investigative TV reporter. She won a George Foster Peabody and Edward R. Murrow for the documentary Toxic Secrets. Leitner also won 12 Emmys for investigative news stories and co-founded Volition Films with Dr. Jordan Schaul.

== Education ==
Leitner graduated from the University of California, Los Angeles with a bachelor's degree in English, before eventually completing her master's degree in journalism from Boston University in Massachusetts.

== Career ==
She established her reputation as a hard-nosed journalist, writing for newspapers in New York and Arizona, including the New York Post. Leitner was honored by the Associated Press Managing Editors for stories she did when she was a police reporter for the East Valley Tribune in Mesa, Arizona.

Leitner joined the news staff of KPHO, the CBS affiliate in Phoenix, Arizona, as a crime reporter on September 3, 2002. She has won twelve Rocky Mountain Emmy Awards - the first in 2004 for a piece she did on Maricopa County Sheriff Joe Arpaio's notorious tent city, the second in 2006 for a breaking news story, her third in 2007 for continuing coverage of an investigative story, and her fourth and fifth for a weeklong series called "Assault on Arizona", which focused on crime and illegal immigration issues at the Arizona-Mexico border. Leitner has 19 Rocky Mountain Emmy nominations to her credit.

Leitner joined WCBS-TV in New York City as an investigative reporter in June 2013. Leitner joined WMAQ-TV in Chicago in March 2014 as an investigative reporter. Leitner joined NBC Nightly News in early June, 2016. As of 2018 Leitner was a contributor with MSNBC's The Rachel Maddow Show.

== Survivor ==
=== Marquesas ===
Leitner was a participant on the 4th season of Survivor, Survivor: Marquesas, which was filmed in late 2001 and aired in 2002.

Leitner was initially placed on the Rotu tribe, alongside Gabriel Cade, John Carroll, Robert DeCanio, Neleh Dennis, Paschal English, Kathy Vavrick-O'Brien and Zoe Zanidakis. Leitner survived the first nine days through under-the-radar gameplay and Rotu's winning streak.

Things changed on day ten when a tribe switch took place. Leitner remained on Rotu alongside Cade, Carroll, DeCanio, and Zanidakis, now joined by Rob Mariano, Sean Rector and Vecepia Towery. The new Rotu was highly dysfunctional but won two of the three following challenges. During this time, Leitner, Carroll, DeCanio, and Zanidakis formed an alliance they called the 'Rotu four'.

On day 19, the tribes merged into Soliantu and the Rotu four convinced Dennis and English to vote out Mariano as he was the alliance's biggest opposer, which did succeed but at the following immunity challenge, despite Leitner winning, the alliance accidentally revealed the pecking order, which prompted Dennis and English to flip on the alliance and vote Carroll out on day 24. With the alliance beginning to crumble, Leitner won the next immunity challenge, with Zanidakis being voted out at the following tribal council. Once Leitner lost the following immunity challenge, her fate was sealed as she was voted out on day 30 in a 5-2 vote, gaining 7th place.

At the final tribal council, Leitner scolded both of the finalists (Dennis and Towery) for different reasons. She voted for Towery to win, and she did in a 4-3 vote.

Leitner was awarded the "Sue Hawk Award" for her speech "Hypocrites" during the Reunion episode of Survivor: Marquesas.

== Books ==
- Don't Say a Thing, non-fiction, true crime (2023)

== Personal life ==
Leitner is also an accomplished athlete and a member of PowerBar Team Elite. She finished first in her division at the 2007 Subaru Women's Triathlon in San Diego, second to Survivor castmate Gina Crews in the celebrity division of the 2006 Nautica Malibu Triathlon, third in her division at the 2008 Las Palomas triathlon and fourth in her division at the 2007 Santa Barbara Triathlon.
