= Survivor: Marquesas =

- Season 4
- Region 1 DVD cover
- Presented by: Jeff Probst
- No. of days: 39
- No. of castaways: 16
- Winner: Vecepia Towery
- Runner-up: Neleh Dennis
- Location: Nuku Hiva, Marquesas Islands, French Polynesia
- No. of episodes: 15

Release
- Original network: CBS
- Original release: February 28 – May 19, 2002

Additional information
- Filming dates: November 12 – December 20, 2001

Season chronology
- ← Previous; Africa Next → Thailand

Survivor: Marquesas is the fourth season of the American CBS competitive reality television series Survivor. The season filmed from November 12, 2001, to December 20, 2001, and premiered on February 28, 2002. Hosted by Jeff Probst, it featured sixteen new contestants competing for 39 days on the island of Nuku Hiva in the Marquesas Islands of French Polynesia. Vecepia Towery, a 36-year-old office manager, was named Sole Survivor after defeating Neleh Dennis, a 21-year-old college student, by a jury vote of 4–3.

== Format ==
Survivor is a reality television show created by Mark Burnett and Charlie Parsons and based on the Swedish show Expedition Robinson. The series follows a number of participants who are isolated in a remote location, where they must provide food, fire, and shelter for themselves. Every three days, one participant is removed from the series by majority vote, with challenges being held to give a reward (ranging from living and food-related prizes to a car) and immunity from being voted off the show. The last remaining player is awarded a prize of $1,000,000.

== Contestants ==
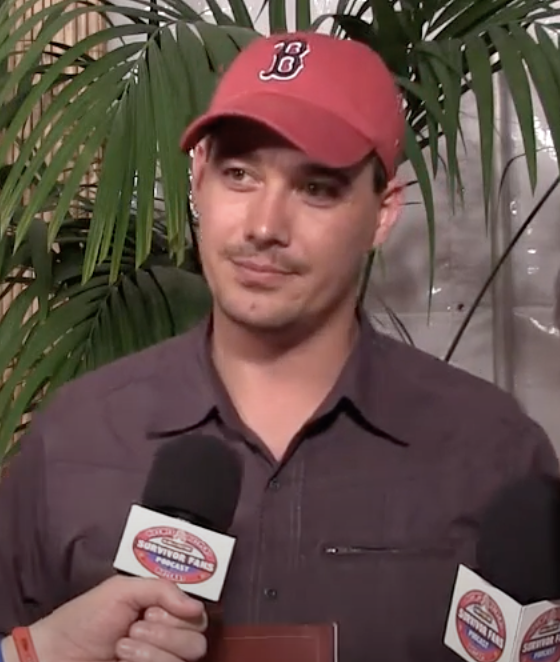
Rob Mariano

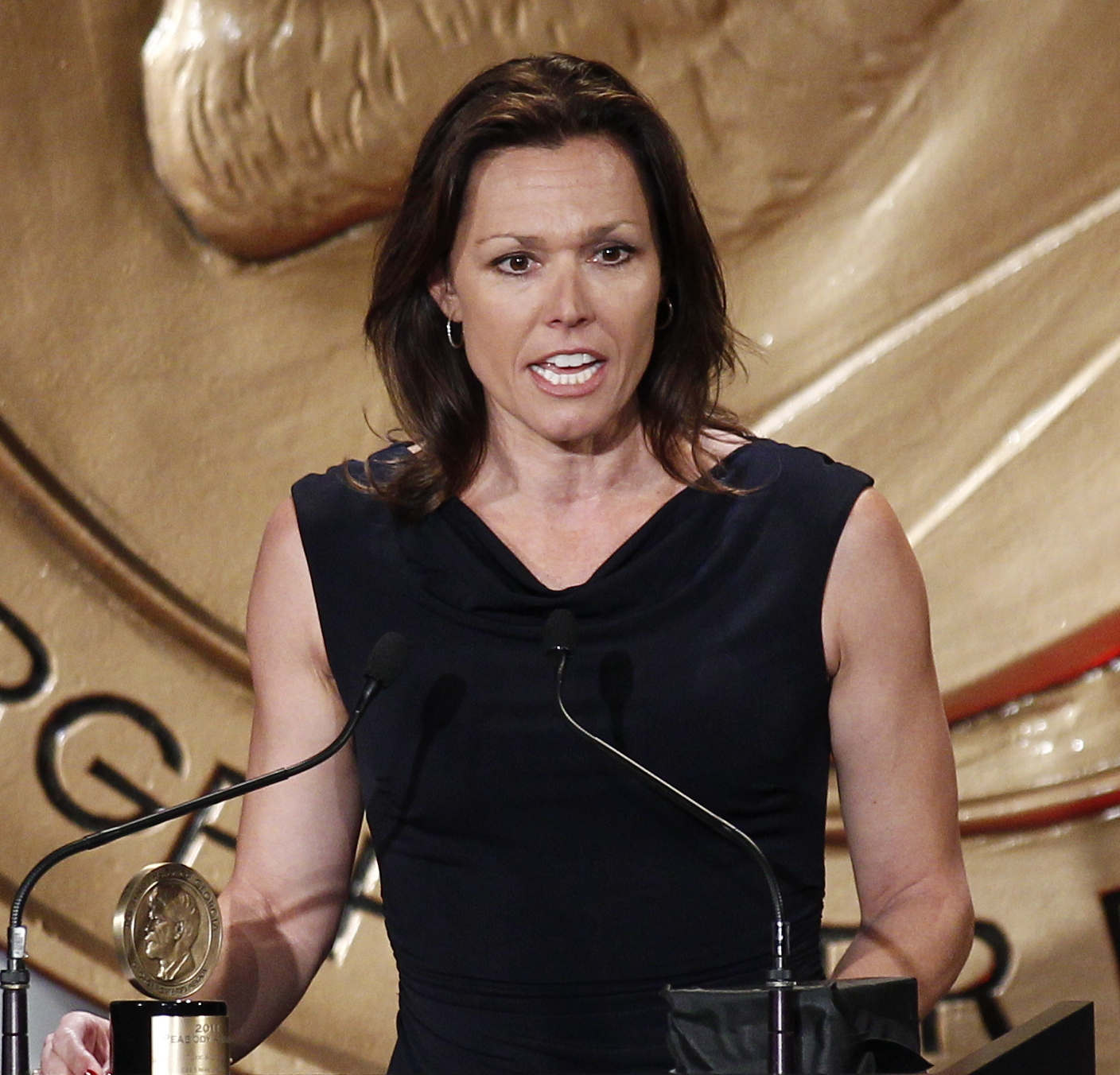
Tammy Leitner

The contestants were divided into two tribes: Maraamu and Rotu (Tahitian words for 'south wind' and 'heavy rain', respectively). They later merged into the Soliantu tribe (a word created by competitors Kathy-Vavrick O'Brien and Rob Mariano which they intended to mean "Sacred Allegiance to the Sun").

List of Survivor: Marquesas contestants
Contestant	Age	From	Tribe			Finish	
Contestant	Age	From	Original	Switched	Merged	Placement	Day
Peter Harkey	44	Millis, Massachusetts	Maraamu			1st voted out	Day 3
Patricia Jackson	49	Lugoff, South Carolina	Maraamu			2nd voted out	Day 6
Hunter Ellis	33	La Jolla, California	Maraamu			3rd voted out	Day 9
Sarah Jones	24	Newport Beach, California	Maraamu	Maraamu		4th voted out	Day 12
Gabriel Cade	23	Hollywood, California	Rotu	Rotu		5th voted out	Day 15
Gina Crews	28	Gainesville, Florida	Maraamu	Maraamu		6th voted out	Day 18
Rob Mariano	25	Canton, Massachusetts	Maraamu	Rotu	Soliantu	7th voted out	Day 21
John Carroll	36	Omaha, Nebraska	Rotu	Rotu	Soliantu	8th voted out 1st jury member	Day 24
Zoe Zanidakis	35	Monhegan, Maine	Rotu	Rotu	Soliantu	9th voted out 2nd jury member	Day 27
Tammy Leitner	29	Mesa, Arizona	Rotu	Rotu	Soliantu	10th voted out 3rd jury member	Day 30
Robert DeCanio	38	College Point, New York	Rotu	Rotu	Soliantu	11th voted out 4th jury member	Day 33
Sean Rector	30	Harlem, New York	Maraamu	Rotu	Soliantu	12th voted out 5th jury member	Day 36
Paschal English	56	Thomaston, Georgia	Rotu	Maraamu	Soliantu	Eliminated (Note: Due to a tied vote with only four players remaining and the castaways being unable to come up with a unanimous decision to vote out either Kathy or Neleh, Kathy, Neleh and Paschal drew rocks to resolve the vote. Paschal drew the purple rock and was eliminated from the game.); 6th jury member	Day 37
Kathy Vavrick-O'Brien	46	Burlington, Vermont	Rotu	Maraamu	Soliantu	13th voted out 7th jury member	Day 38
Neleh Dennis	21	Layton, Utah	Rotu	Maraamu	Soliantu	Runner-up	Day 39
Vecepia Towery	36	Hayward, California	Maraamu	Rotu	Soliantu	Sole Survivor	Day 39

=== Future appearances ===
Kathy Vavrick-O'Brien and Rob Mariano competed again in Survivor: All-Stars. Mariano later participated for three more seasons: Survivor: Heroes vs. Villains, Survivor: Redemption Island, and Survivor: Winners at War. These appearances made him the first castaway to play five seasons of Survivor. He also appeared on Survivor: Island of the Idols serving as a mentor alongside Sandra Diaz-Twine.

Outside of Survivor, Mariano competed on The Amazing Race 7 with his fiancée and fellow Survivor alumna Amber Brkich. The couple, now married, returned for The Amazing Race All-Stars. In 2024, Mariano competed on Deal or No Deal Island. In 2025, Mariano competed on the third season of the Peacock reality TV series The Traitors. In 2025, Vecepia Towery-Leonard competed on The Price Is Right.

== Season summary ==
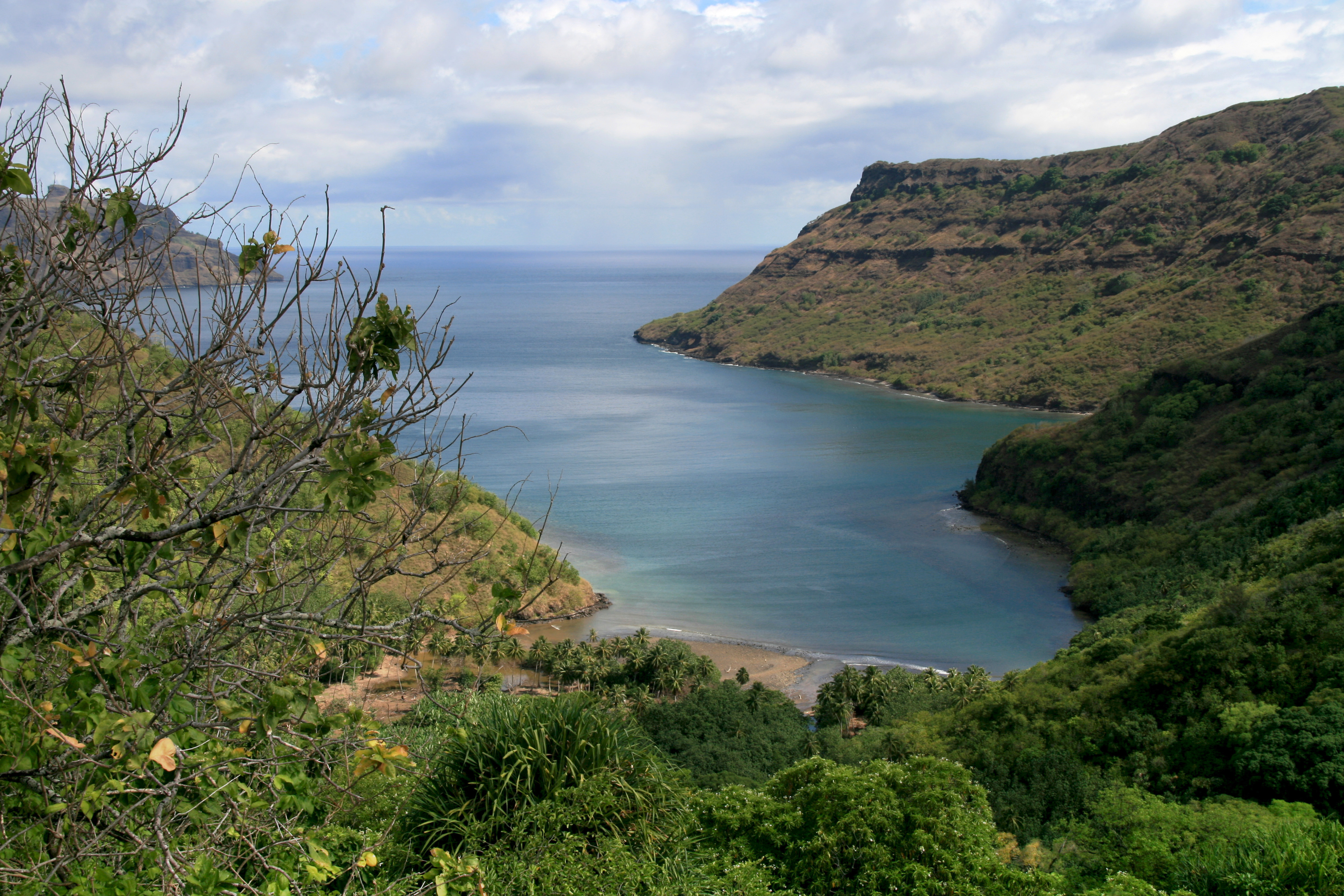
The fourth season of Survivor filmed on Nuku Hiva in the Marquesas Islands.

The sixteen contestants were divided into two preselected tribes of eight, Rotu and Maraamu. The Rotu tribe prospered as a unified, hard-working group, while the Maraamu tribe quickly became divided between those who worked, led by Hunter, and those who didn't, led by Rob. Rob's faction dominated the votes while Maraamu lost every single challenge in the first nine days. On Day 10, a random tribe shuffle sent Rob and his allies Sean and Vecepia to Rotu, while Paschal, Neleh, and Kathy joined Maraamu. While Rob seemed like an easy choice to eliminate, original Rotu member John aligned with fellow original Rotu members Tammy, Robert, and Zoe to eliminate Gabriel, the fifth remaining original Rotu member, for being strategically apathetic.

The tribes merged with ten players remaining: seven original Rotu and three original Maraamu. Rob attempted to align with Kathy, Paschal, and Neleh to overthrow John's alliance, but was unsuccessful and consequently eliminated. However, Paschal and Neleh later wisened up to their inferior positions within the Rotu alliance, aligning with Vecepia, Sean, and Kathy to take control of the game, systematically voting off John and his allies.

With only the five remaining, Kathy found herself caught between the two duos of Neleh and Paschal, and Vecepia and Sean. She aligned with the former to eliminate Sean, but Vecepia won immunity at the final four. Knowing Paschal and Neleh would not vote for each other, Kathy publicly approached Vecepia at Tribal Council about aligning and taking each other to the final Tribal Council. Vecepia agreed to the deal, and they agreed to both vote for Neleh that night. With the vote being tied and deadlocked for the first time, the new rules for breaking a tie came into effect as everyone (save for the immune Vecepia) would reach into a bag and pull out a colored rock, with the purple rock meaning elimination. Paschal drew the purple rock, resulting in his elimination despite having no votes cast against him throughout the game. At the final Immunity Challenge, Vecepia went back on her deal with Kathy, agreeing to let Neleh win immunity in exchange that Neleh would vote off Kathy. Neleh agreed and Kathy became the final member of the jury.

At the Final Tribal Council, both Vecepia and Neleh were lambasted for hiding behind religion while still backstabbing the jurors. However, Paschal praised both finalists. Neleh was praised for her honesty and close strategic and personal bond with Paschal, but also criticized for not starting to play the game until day 24. Vecepia was praised for her under-the-radar strategic and social game despite being in the minority, but criticized for using religion to betray Kathy the night before. Ultimately, Vecepia was awarded the title of Sole Survivor in a 4–3 vote due to playing from day 1–39.

Challenge winners and eliminations by episode
Episode			Challenge winner(s)		Eliminated	
No.	Title	Original air date	Reward	Immunity	Tribe	Player
1	"Back to the Beach"	February 28, 2002	None	Rotu	Maraamu	Peter
2	"Nacho Momma"	March 7, 2002	Rotu	Rotu	Maraamu	Patricia
3	"No Pain, No Gain"	March 13, 2002	Rotu	Rotu	Maraamu	Hunter
4	"The Winds Twist"	March 20, 2002	None (Note: There was no reward challenge due to the tribe switch.)	Rotu	Maraamu	Sarah
5	"The End of Innocence"	March 28, 2002	Maraamu	Maraamu	Rotu	Gabriel
6	"The Underdogs"	April 4, 2002	Maraamu	Rotu	Maraamu	Gina
7	"True Lies"	April 11, 2002	Rob, Kathy (Note: There was no reward challenge due to the merge.)	Kathy	Soliantu	Rob
8	"Jury's Out"	April 18, 2002	Kathy	Tammy	Soliantu	John
9	"Look Closer: The First 24 Days"	April 24, 2002	Recap Episode			
10	"Two Peas in a Pod"	April 25, 2002	Paschal, Sean	Tammy	Soliantu	Zoe
11	"The Princess"	May 2, 2002	Paschal [Neleh]	Robert	Soliantu	Tammy
12	"Marquesan Vacation"	May 9, 2002	Kathy (Note: In a twist, the Survivors' family members competed in a challenge on behalf of their loved ones. Kathy's son, Patrick, won the challenge and the right to spend 24 hours at the Soliantu camp.)	Vecepia	Soliantu	Robert
13	"A Tale of Two Cities"	May 16, 2002	Sean	Kathy	Soliantu	Sean
14	"The Sole Survivor"	May 19, 2002	None	Vecepia	Soliantu	Paschal
14	"The Sole Survivor"	May 19, 2002	None	Neleh	Soliantu	Kathy
15	"The Reunion"	May 19, 2002				

In the case of multiple tribes or castaways who win reward or immunity, they are listed in order of finish, or alphabetically where it was a team effort; where one castaway won and invited others, the invitees are in brackets.

== Episodes ==
No. overall	No. in season	Title	CBS recap	Original release date	U.S. viewers (millions)	Rating/share (18-49)
46	1	"Back to the Beach"	Recap	February 21, 2002	23.19	9.1/22
The sixteen competitors began the competition by jumping off the fishing boat, Amaryllis, in the middle of the ocean with the bare essentials: two machetes, two cooking pots, two empty water containers, one frying pan, one filet knife, and one magnifying glass. They were divided into two tribes of eight: Maraamu (Tahitian for wind) wearing yellow, and Rotu (Tahitian for rain) wearing blue, and had to paddle two miles to their beaches. Due to the extreme current, the Rotu tribe was making no progress, but by rowing together they started to move. Maraamu noticed that Sarah was not giving an effort into helping row to the beach. After landing on the beach, Sean and Peter had a prayer session out in the water, and Rob thought "they either started playing the game as soon as possible, or they were off their rocker." Rotu tried using their magnifying glass to start a flame, but the sky was filled with clouds so they couldn't directly start a fire. They then tried starting a fire with friction, which also didn't work out. As soon as Kathy walked away, some of the tribe voiced their annoyance with her. Hunter look the leadership role at Maraamu, and they got much smoke, and thanks to Peter's long breaths, they finally got a fire. At night, Rob and Sarah's flirtations had the rest of the tribe talking. Rotu found a waterfall near their camp, and also found much taro to eat. Maraamu found some grapefruit trees. Rob heard a rooster crowing at camp, and went on a wild chase, but it flew away into the ocean never to be seen again. Hunter thought Rob was wasting his time and needed to work on other chores. Back at Rotu, John argued with Kathy about the fire situation, but he felt bad afterward so wanted to start the fire for her, which he and Zoe did. Maraamu found their water source, and Peter thought he was working too hard, so he decided to take a break.: Immunity challenge: Each tribe has an outrigger canoe with two torches. The teams must run down the beach with it and then swim with it out to a wok where they must light both torches, then come back to the beach, lighting four torches along the way. Once they get back to shore, they must sprint along the shore, lighting three more torches, get the canoe back in its stand, and light the final torch.; The immunity challenge proved tough. Maraamu was first to the center wok, but had issues lighting their torches, and Rotu took the lead. Things got worse as they dropped one of the torches in the water. Rotu won immunity fairly handily. Peter wanted to keep the tribe as strong as possible, and Gina said she was going to vote the way she wanted to vote and that no one would talk her into voting a certain way. Some of the women thought that Peter was strange. Sean thought the more males on the tribe, the better, and he wanted to vote out Sarah. Going into the first Tribal Council, there were no clear alliances, and a lot of people had no idea who they were voting for. Surprisingly, the majority of the tribe came together and voted off Peter due to his personality quirks and excessive strategizing.
47	2	"Nacho Momma"	Recap	February 28, 2002	23.40	9.4/23
At Rotu, the tribe bonded with a massage line and commented how they were getting along really well, but Kathy continued to alienate herself by sleeping by herself. Rob was also struggling physically due to the lack of food. Some of the men made traps and fishing gear to try and catch some protein. At Maraamu, Hunter, Rob, and Sean's morning show was entertaining the tribe, and put them in high spirits. Patricia, or "Momma" as she was nicknamed by the tribe, stepped up around camp. John wanted to be as high as possible on the pecking order, and caught a shrimp with the trap that he made. Almost immediately after, Kathy called the tribe over as she found a trove of shells and crabs. Back at Maraamu, Patricia's hard work turned into bossiness, which rubbed some people the wrong way. Sean and Vecepia bonded over their culture and love for God. Although Sean looked physically strong, Gina and Hunter noted his laziness around camp. They also noticed that Rob and Sarah were spending a lot of time together, and Hunter thought that if Sarah were to go, they could get more productivity out of Rob. Again back at Rotu, Kathy wanted to have a meeting about the shelter because there wasn't enough room for everyone. Gabriel fought back a little, saying that she wasn't putting forth the effort to get to know everyone. Still, they redid their shelter to include everyone.: Reward challenge: Each tribe has a boat anchored at the bottom of the ocean floor with about 250 rocks inside. They must dive down and remove as many rocks as possible until the boat floats to the surface. Then, they must bail enough water as they determine necessary and paddle to the beach. The winning tribe receives fishing gear: mask, snorkel, and fins.; While Maraamu only sent down one or two people at a time, Rotu went down in groups. They finally sent a group down to flip the boat instead; it worked and rose to the surface. Maraamu followed suit, rising their boat to the surface. While Rotu flipped their boat on their dock, Maraamu flipped it in the water and had to bail water out. That gave Rotu the advantage, and they ran their boat to their mat, giving them their second straight win. Back at Maraamu, Sarah voiced her opinions about the shelter, but no one wanted to listen to her because she wasn't willing to put in the effort to do it herself.: Immunity challenge: One at a time, each tribe member must bob for a piece of fafaru (marinated fish bones, crab and lobster legs) and eat it without throwing up. After 8 rounds, if every person had eaten their piece, each tribe had to select a member of the other tribe to do the tiebreaker.; Rotu chose Rob and Maraamu chose Neleh to do the tiebreaker. While both had problems, Rob threw part of his up and Neleh got hers down first, giving Rotu another win. At Tribal Council, Sarah admitted she did less work in order to conserve energy at the challenges, to which Gina responded that if she has to pick up people's slack at camp, she is twice as tired at the challenges. Although Sarah received three votes, an early alliance was formed as Vecepia, Sean, Rob, and Sarah voted out Patricia due to her overall bossiness, being the weakest link in the tribe, and per their alliance.
48	3	"No Pain, No Gain"	Recap	March 7, 2002	20.46	8.9/24
After Maraamu's vote, Sarah got upset about people saying she didn't do work around camp, and an argument broke out. Rotu began to repair their shelter after they got soaked from a rainstorm. Paschal formed a tight bond with Neleh, because she reminded him of his two daughters. He became the father figure around camp. John landed on a sea urchin and needed someone to pee on his hand, which Kathy did. The Maraamu members were having big issues with the nonos, which were biting them horribly. While moving the bamboo poles for their raft up to camp, Robert stepped on a rock and sliced the bottom of his big toe open, which John took care of. Later on, John got bitten by an eel while looking for food, which gave him a deep cut on one of his fingers.: Reward challenge: Each tribe has to construct a raft from bamboo and rope that can fit 6 members and other supplies. Each tribe has to paddle in a criss-cross fashion to five boxes that are anchored to the bottom of the ocean. The winning tribe receives blankets, pillows, and three lanterns, or a week's worth of rice.; At the reward challenge, the tribes were relatively even, and collided in the middle of the course. But on the fourth box, Maraamu had issues unhooking their box and Rotu got back to the start line first, and chose to take the comfort items. Being 0 for 4 in the challenges, Maraamu needed a win badly.: Immunity challenge: Get three coconuts through a puzzle maze. Using pulleys to raise and lower their platform, one person will guide the coconut through the maze, and each time one falls through the hole, the caller must be switched.; Maraamu scored first with Vecepia guiding the coconut to the hole, with Gabriel scoring for Rotu soon after. Sarah quickly navigated Maraaamu to score #2, with Paschal scoring right after. With Rob and Zoe directing, Maraamu kept circling the final hole and Rotu easily dropped theirs in, winning immunity for the third straight time. Hunter and Gina tried to target Sean, but when Hunter told Rob, Rob said he wanted people on his tribe that he could control, and didn't care about how strong his team was physically. Even though Sarah received two more votes at Tribal Council, it was Hunter who was voted out.
49	4	"The Winds Twist"	Recap	March 14, 2002	22.81	9.5/26
Gathering at the reward challenge, Jeff told everyone to stand on a piece of log. Under each piece was a new buff. The new Rotu tribe consisted of Zoe, Gabriel, John, Vecepia, Rob, Sean, Robert, and Tammy while the new Maraamu tribe consisted of Gina, Neleh, Kathy, Sarah, and Paschal. The new Maraamu members were excited to have a change of food from the shells they were used to. The new Rotu members felt welcomed in their camp but noticed that they did a lot more work. Rob was worried that he was in the minority and ripped his new tribemates. Sean said he felt like a slave and that he was really tired towards the end of the day. The Maraamu tribe decided to go for a hike and eventually got lost; Kathy wanted to go further while some of the tribe wanted to head back. They found a pool with shrimp in it. While the rest of the tribe stayed to try and catch some shrimp, Sarah wanted to head back to avoid being bitten by the nonos. However, she got herself lost and headed back to where the rest of her tribe was. Back at Rotu, Sean grew tired of working so much around camp and complained about it to Gabriel. Rob asked Vecepia what she thought about everything, and she said she wanted to stay out of the drama as much as possible.: Immunity challenge: Each tribe has to unscramble a woven tapestry.; Rotu got off to a fast start, while Maraamu struggled. Kathy was the only one offering directions, while Gabriel and Vecepia led the way for Rotu. Rotu easily won their fourth straight immunity, but this is the first time Rob, Sean, and Vecepia won while this is the first time Kathy, Neleh, and Paschal lost. Gina told Kathy, Neleh, and Paschal she wanted Sarah out because of her weakness in challenges and her laziness around camp. Meanwhile, Sarah was oblivious to her tribemates wanting her out and believed that it was everyone for themselves. At Tribal Council, the original Rotu members sided with Gina and Sarah was unanimously voted out.
50	5	"The End of Innocence"	Recap	March 21, 2002	20.54	8.2/22
Rob was not happy at Rotu because he was in the minority and he had everything under control at Maraamu. He thought that Sean would definitely be the first to go, followed by a tossup between himself and Vecepia, so he tried to get himself in further with the original Rotu members to further himself. Gabriel said he was not there to play the game, but for the experience, which bothered John. At Maraamu, they found tons of crabs and were able to make an entire pan full of crab meat.: Reward challenge: Fourteen pieces belonging to four tikis are scattered on a course. One member will guide three blindfolded members to the fourteen pieces. Once all pieces are back, the four tikis must be reconstructed. The winning tribe gets to raid the losing tribe's camp.; At the reward challenge, Gabriel and Kathy were chosen as the eyes for their tribe. Rotu took an early lead and had 13 pieces, but could not find the last piece. Maraamu made up the difference and collected all their pieces first. Rotu eventually found their last piece, but Maraamu was too far ahead. Maraamu won by a landslide, giving the tribe, and Gina, their first win. They had two minutes to raid Rotu's camp, and nearly every reward item Rotu had won ended up with Maraamu. John noticed Gabriel bonding with the three original Maraamu members. When he approached him about his voting strategy, Gabriel said he didn't have one and that he would only tell John who he was voting for beforehand; John did not feel comfortable with that and said that Gabriel was no longer safe, and that he wanted to get rid of him. John concocted an alliance of himself, Robert, Zoe, and Tammy. In order to avoid a tie, John approached Sean about voting for Gabriel as well.: Immunity challenge: Each tribe must build a distress signal without using fire to signal a ship from a distance.; Maraamu's raid proved useful as they used a lot of the supplies taken from Rotu to help their signal. Rotu quickly realized that all three of the former Maraamu members were participating in the challenge, which worried Robert. Rotu built a signal with their raft and their life jackets, but the captain said he didn't think it was a very good signal. Maraamu used the insides and outsides of their life-jackets, Paschal's American flag, and their white blankets to create moving signals. The captain said that Maraamu's distress signal was much more obvious, and Maraamu won their second challenge and their first immunity. John continued to talk to the other members of Maraamu to get rid of Gabriel, but Rob had other plans and considered getting rid of John. After talking to Rob, Gabriel weighed his options of continuing to play his game or by joining forces. John worried that he may have hatched his plan too early and thought he may be going home. However, Gabriel's apathetic attitude toward playing the game cost him and he was unanimously voted out. Despite voting against Gabriel himself, Rob told John he was coming after him.
51	6	"The Underdogs"	Recap	March 28, 2002	22.17	9.1/24
With Gabriel gone, John took charge at Rotu, and the four original Rotu members (John, Robert, Tammy, and Zoe) agreed to stick together to the final four. Rob and Sean agreed that their only option was to hope the tribe wins immunity until the merge. Rob was suspicious of Vecepia, stating that she's been distancing herself from them since they came to Rotu. At Maraamu, they collected more crabs.: Reward challenge: A three part relay race. The first runner races through the jungle, unties a paddle, and tags the second runner. Both then race to untie a second paddle, and then race back to the beach where they break open coconuts to find a key. The two runners pass the paddles and the key to two other tribe members, who must unchain a boat, paddle the boat out to retrieve a flag, then paddle back to plant their flag in the tiki. When the paddlers return to shore, they must push their boat to their chain and both paddlers must be present at the tiki when they put their flag in. The winning tribe receives a meal of chicken, quiche, bean salad, dessert, and Sierra Mist.; At the reward challenge, the Maraamu tribe was shocked to see that Gabriel was voted out. Rob and Zoe easily beat Paschal and Neleh in the jungle portion of the race, however John and Robert had difficulty paddling together, allowing Gina and Kathy to overtake them on the water, retrieving their flag first. However, John and Robert managed to catch up as the boats were heading back. Gina and Kathy forgot to take their flag as they ran to the finish, allowing John and Robert to put their flag in the tiki first. Jeff announced that Rotu won the challenge; but Maraamu protested, claiming Robert was not at the tiki before Gina and Kathy put their flag in after John. Jeff then went to the boats to see if they were in reach of their chains. Maraamu's boat was okay, but Rotu placed their boat too far from their chain. Jeff then stated Maraamu was correct and that Robert had to be at the tiki with John. Jeff corrected his statement and declared Maraamu the winning tribe. Back at the camps, Maraamu feasted with Rob and Sean were disappointed but the four original members of Rotu declared they didn't really need food also pointing out the Maraamu members would just make themselves sick eating all that food. Paschal was disappointed that Rotu turned on Gabriel, and he and Neleh bonded with Gina which concerned Kathy. Rob confronted Zoe about being in an alliance, which she denied. He then confronted John who confirmed that the original four Rotu members were sticking together. After they reached an agreement not to work against each other, Rob asked, "Are you gay?" John answered yes. The four original Rotu members discussed getting rid of Rob but Tammy didn't want to throw a challenge.: Immunity challenge: Retrieve five ladder rungs, in order, from throughout a giant maze, while roped together. Climb the ladder they build in the center of the maze.; At the immunity challenge, Rotu was led by Rob and Maraamu was led by Kathy. Rotu won easily. Maraamu returned to camp to discover that they had no fire or banked coals. Kathy and Gina discussed if they should vote together to rid of the Neleh and Paschal pair, but ended up arguing about whether putting sand on coals banks (Kathy's method) or puts them out (Gina's view). At Tribal Council, Gina and Kathy fought for Neleh's and Paschal's votes. In the end, the Neleh and Paschal bloc decided to stay loyal to ex-Rotu member Kathy and Gina was voted out.
52	7	"True Lies"	Recap	April 4, 2002	19.34	7.7/22
After unwittingly discovering an ancient burial (or paepae) with a visible skull and ribcage along with Neleh and Paschal at Maraamu beach, Kathy thought that she would be the next to be voted out when she noticed how strong a bond Neleh and Paschal had. Meanwhile, at Rotu, unhappy with several of his tribemates and disliking the happiness that they seemed to have with one another, Rob told Sean that the others might try to vote one of them out so that a new alliance could not be formed. Each tribe later got a tree mail message telling them they had five minutes to select one member to hike to a destination unknown. Rob volunteered to go for Rotu, while Kathy was picked to go for Maraamu. Rob and Kathy eventually crossed paths with one another and met Jeff at a meeting place called a Tohua. Jeff explained to the two of them that by being sent there, they had been chosen as ambassadors who would be responsible for the upcoming tribal merge. Both would spend the night there to discuss tribal situations, decide on the new tribe's name and paint the new tribe's flag. After leading both ambassadors to a picnic table, Jeff surprised them with a feast of pizza and beer. As they ate, Rob shocked Kathy by telling her that her old tribemates from Rotu planned on aligning with him, Sean, and Vecepia to target the remaining Maraamu members upon the merge. Feeling betrayed by her old friends, particularly Zoe, Kathy made a pact with Rob promising not to vote out each other before turning in for the night. The next morning, Kathy returned to Maraamu beach with Rob by her side and told Neleh and Paschal that they had five minutes to gather everything from their camp and put it on their raft before paddling to Rotu beach. Upon arrival at Rotu, Kathy, Neleh, Paschal, and Rob received a big welcome from everyone else. Despite being glad to see everyone, Kathy was hesitant due to what Rob told her the night before. When Rob gathered everyone else around, he passed out the new purple buffs, presented the new tribe's flag revealing the new tribe's name as Soliantu (meaning "Sacred Allegiance to the Sun"). Shortly after settling down from all the excitement, things were back to business as usual. Kathy approached Paschal and explained why she felt vulnerable. Later, while eating together, she told other tribemates how she felt and that she didn't want anyone lying. The next day, Rob questioned Zoe as to whether she planned on voting for Kathy. Zoe's denial upset Kathy, who walked off uncertain as to who was being loyal. Rob made it clear that being continuously lied to aggravated him, while Kathy realized how badly she needed to win immunity.: Immunity challenge: Each player stands on a floating platform in the water. Whoever stays on their platform the longest without falling off or touching the platform with any part of their body besides their feet wins.; When it came down to two players (John and Kathy), John leaned down and touched his platform, giving Kathy a much-needed victory. As Tribal Council loomed, Rob and Sean had a heated disagreement with John over the vote. Sean lashed out about the vote being individual when four people voted alike. At Tribal Council, Jeff revealed a new facet: Whoever had individual immunity had the option to assign it to another player. Kathy decided not to give up immunity and the tribe cast their votes. Vecepia and the Rotu members (minus Kathy) stuck together to vote Rob out over John and Zoe.
53	8	"Jury's Out"	Recap	April 11, 2002	19.88	8.0/23
Upon returning from Tribal Council after voting off Rob, members of the recently merged Soliantu tribe congratulated one another on making it as far as they've gotten. Shortly afterward, Sean made it evident that he had a flatulence problem. Robert concluded that the tribe's usual Marquesan diet has affected Sean's system. The next morning, the tribe noticed how fortunate they were to have discovered that two trees had fallen near their tent as a result of a fierce storm that hit their camp. Later on, Kathy asked Zoe if she, John, Robert, and Tammy were planning on voting her out. Kathy didn't believe Zoe when she denied such plot. After cooling off in the waterfall near their camp, the tribe discovered a message attached to a kite-making kit at their tree mail. The message instructed the players to make their own kites for the next reward challenge. As the tribe worked away, Kathy believed the next thing to do was to target players who were originally on Maraamu prior to the tribal switch, but wished she could eliminate John and Tammy instead. Kathy approached Paschal hoping to convince him that targeting stronger players was the way to ensure them a longer stay in the game.: Reward challenge: Each player has a kite (which they made themselves prior to the challenge). The first player to get their kite 300 feet in the air wins a king-size Snickers candy bar and a scuba diving trip at a coral reef.; During the challenge, several players found it difficult to get their kites up, but Kathy's kite rose above all others, clinching her another victory. While Kathy was out scuba diving, voting strategies were being made as Neleh and Paschal aligned with John, Robert, Tammy, and Zoe planning to vote out Sean at the next Tribal Touncil. When Kathy returned, she shared her Snickers bar with her tribemates. Although all were appreciative of Kathy to do so, John was not impressed saying that his share of Kathy's bar was not enough to change his vote. Sensing vulnerability, Sean urged Kathy to vote with him hoping that Neleh and Paschal would follow suit. Kathy agreed with Sean theorizing that John and Tammy were playing in such a way that would make them difficult to vote out. However, Neleh disagreed with Kathy explaining that there would always be alliances and that the more they spoke out, the more vulnerable they became. Despite Kathy telling him that, she refused to be a pawn to help John and Tammy make it to the final day, Paschal chose not to align with Sean and Vecepia. John felt confident that Neleh and Paschal were supporting him.: Immunity challenge: The players are asked questions about surviving on the Marquesas Islands. Each player has a station with three ropes each tied to a bundle of coconuts hanging from trees. A correct answer gives a player the right to cut one of the other players' ropes, causing a bundle of coconuts to fall to the ground. Losing all three bundles means elimination from the game. The last player left with at least one bundle of coconuts wins.; At the immunity challenge, Sean realized his vulnerability by being the first to be eliminated followed by Vecepia and Kathy, all of whom noticed an irritating pecking order as John, Robert, Tammy, and Zoe seemed to work as a group to eliminate all others, all of whom believed that this order (of Sean, Vecepia, Kathy, Paschal, and Neleh) would be formulated at the subsequent five votes at Tribal Council. The challenge ended with Tammy cutting loose Robert's last coconut bundle, giving her individual immunity. After the challenge, Vecepia sensed arrogance among John, Robert, Tammy, and Zoe. Sean seconded Vecepia's observation and was not surprised at the Rotu alliance's arrogance at the challenge. Neleh and Paschal were also angry with what happened at the challenge, finally noticing the Rotu alliance wanting the other five to be their sitting ducks. At Tribal Council, Neleh and Paschal aligned with Kathy, Sean, and Vecepia. As a result, John was voted out over Sean and became the first member of the jury.
54	9	"Look Closer: The First 24 Days"	N/A	April 18, 2002	12.50	4.8/15
Highlights and never-before-seen footage recap castaways' first 24 days on the island of Nuku Hiva.
55	10	"Two Peas in a Pod"	Recap	April 25, 2002	19.42	7.8/20
Sean was overjoyed over John's departure as a result of the previous Tribal Council vote, realizing a new day for him, Kathy, Neleh, Paschal, and Vecepia. Neleh found it funny to have beaten John, Robert, Tammy, and Zoe at their own game. Later, Tammy realized that she and Robert were outcasts, being seen as traitors by the others, and it was their own fault for trusting John. Tammy then questioned Zoe's intentions only to have Zoe deny forming an alliance with Tammy, John, and Robert. Zoe even revealed to Tammy that she never liked her.: Reward challenge: The eight remaining players are separated into four teams of two by random drawing. Each team has a three-foot bamboo shoot and it's up to the teams to fill them with coconut juice using coconuts from the shoreline or from the parcels anchored in the water. Once retrieved, the coconuts must be cracked and drained into the shoots. the first team to fill their shoot to the top wins a helicopter ride over the Marquesas, a horseback ride and an authentic Marquesan feast.; At the reward challenge, the players were separated into four teams of two. Sean was teamed with Paschal, Tammy with Vecepia, Kathy with Robert, and Neleh with Zoe. All four teams must race to fill a bamboo shoot with coconut juice with the winners going by helicopter to a mountaintop where they would ride horses to a Marquesan feast. It was a frantic race, but due to Sean draining a huge coconut early on, he and Paschal came out on top and won the reward. The next day, Paschal and Sean were taken by helicopter to a mountaintop where they met two Marquesan tribesmen who, despite Sean's anxiety, had them mount on horses and journey to where their feast would take place. They were greeted by locals upon arrival and were served coconut drinks with which they toasted to their new friendship. The locals performed a traditional dance upon Paschal and Sean's arrival at their dining area. Once served, Sean said a prayer before he and Paschal feasted on everything including roast pig, goat and potatoes and even went as far as to sneak food in their pockets for their tribemates before dancing with the locals. When the locals departed, Paschal and Sean tearfully soaked in the experience before returning to camp. Everyone was grateful to Paschal and Sean for bringing food from their feast. The next morning, Tammy spoke with Robert and the two tried to re-align with Neleh and Paschal without success. Zoe made shell jewelry for the rest of the tribe hoping to win their confidence and friendship and have an effect on distancing her from Robert and an unconvinced Tammy. Later, the tribe found a message written on a pair of stilts at their tree mail. The message tells the tribe to practice walking on them for the next immunity challenge. Several players had trouble balancing on them, much to the delight of Tammy, who had no trouble at all when practicing on the beach.: Immunity Challenge: The players enter a ring walking on stilts, trying to knock their opponents off their stilts. The first to fall off is eliminated, leading the winner to move on to the next round. The player left on their stilts after the final round wins.; Tammy's practicing paid off and won her individual immunity for the second straight time. After a debate over who would be next to go, the eight members of Soliantu hiked to Tribal Council, where Zoe was unanimously voted out over Robert, making her the second member of the jury.
56	11	"The Princess"	Recap	May 2, 2002	19.60	7.8/21
There were complaints over the living situation due to a restless night's sleep had by the remaining members of the Soliantu tribe. Sean was uncertain as to the sincerity among tribemates after witnessing hugs as good morning gestures. Later that morning, the tribe celebrated Vecepia's 36th birthday with a special breakfast of bananas and mangoes, much to Vecepia's delight. With only coconuts, taro root and troca left to eat, the tribe's energy level was lower than ever. Armed with a machete in hand, Kathy stood by the shoreline hoping to catch one of the baby black-tipped sharks swimming in the shallow waters. But apparently the waves stopped her from even striking one blow. After checking for tree mail, Sean serenaded a teary-eyed Vecepia with a rendition of "Happy Birthday" with hugs and kisses.: Reward challenge: The tribe plays "Musical Chairs" island-style by racing to retrieve either of six shells from the ocean floor. Whoever does not retrieve a shell is eliminated from the game. Similar rounds are played until four players remain. Those four then race from a dock to the shore carrying a 40-pound rock underwater. The first to reach shore and drop their rock at Jeff's feet wins a day on a luxury cruise ship with a hot shower, change of clothes and a full-course meal.; At the reward challenge, Vecepia was first to be eliminated as she was unsuccessful in finding one of six shells on the ocean floor. Sean and Neleh had the same misfortune in the next two rounds, bringing it down to a race between Kathy, Paschal, Robert, and Tammy to bring a 40-pound rock to shore from underwater. In spite of being older than all the others and at his lowest level of energy, Paschal was first to retrieve his rock and drop it by Jeff's feet, making him the winner. Later that day, a cruise ship came toward Soliantu's beach and Jeff pulled up in a small motorboat to pick up Paschal. As the rest of the tribe enviously witnessed Paschal board his boat, Jeff surprised Paschal by asking him if there's someone he'd like to take with him. In a sudden fit of excitement, Paschal surprised Neleh by calling out to her waving his arms. Screaming, Neleh rushed to the motorboat and hugged Paschal upon boarding. Paschal's quick choice was much to the chagrin of Sean who would have chosen Vecepia as a birthday gift to her. Once checked in, Neleh and Paschal were led to their rooms where they found changes of clothes on their beds. Soon after, they had their first showers in almost a month. Later, they had a fancy dinner with fresh bread, escargot, steak and crème brûlée. As the rest of the tribe awaited Neleh and Paschal's return, Tammy wondered if they would bring back food from the ship. Neleh and Paschal returned to camp full-bellied but empty-handed. Neleh's full description of the experience rubbed Kathy the wrong way. Upset over not bringing back food to her starving tribemates, Neleh offered to share a small mint from the ship that she had previously put in her mouth. No one accepted Neleh's offer. The next morning, Sean was not convinced that Neleh was doing her share of the work at camp. Kathy seconded Sean's observation. Meanwhile, Robert tried to impress the others and securing his position by building a pig snare. As Tammy assisted him, Robert explained that if she won immunity and if he caught a wild pig that had been seen occasionally, both were safe at the next Tribal Council.: Immunity challenge: The players race to gather firewood to place under a wok filled with oil and popcorn kernels. Using flint and steel, they then must build a fire hot enough to boil the oil and pop the kernels. When at least one kernel has popped, they must transfer the fire to the bottom of a station and build it to ignite a pyre at the top. The first to ignite their pyre wins.; At the immunity challenge that night, all seven players raced to gather enough firewood to place under their woks. With other players struggling with their flint and steel and despite being second after Vecepia to start his fire, Robert was the first to get his popcorn popping. Wasting no time, Robert transferred his fire to his station where he continued to build it. Vecepia was next to pop her popcorn and quickly worked to catch up. However, Robert's fire quickly built high enough to light the pyre at the top of his station and edge out Vecepia, winning him individual immunity. Robert's celebration did not last long knowing that Tammy was the only other person remaining from John's Rotu alliance and feared she would be next to go. The next night, Robert's fears came true as at Tribal Council, Tammy was voted out over Vecepia, making her the third member of the jury.
57	12	"Marquesan Vacation"	Recap	May 9, 2002	20.83	8.1/22
The six remaining members of the Soliantu tribe continued to run low on energy after another bad night's sleep and homesickness kicks in as all discuss missing friends and family. A teary-eyed Kathy found the effect on the tribe's mental stability uncanny. Sean nearly fell from a tree trying to fix the hut with Robert catching him in the nick of time. Paschal found it weird to miss home and enjoy the tribe's companionship at the same time. Being the last of John's Rotu alliance, Robert realized he had to play harder than ever. After teasing the tribe with the chance to win the right to call home at the reward challenge, Jeff surprised everyone by bringing out their loved ones. Among the six loved ones were Neleh's mother Rebecca, Kathy's son Patrick, Robert's sister Diana, Sean's buddy Daryl, Vecepia's fiancé Leander and Paschal's wife Beverly. After explaining the object of the reward challenge, Jeff surprised all by announcing that the loved ones would compete instead of the tribe.: Reward challenge: The loved ones of the six remaining players stand around the edge of a large puzzle consisting of individual hexagonal pieces. One at a time, the loved ones move from one piece to another, flipping each piece they step off of to green (a green piece cannot be stepped on). Once trapped in with green all around, a loved one is out of the game. Six pieces of the puzzle read "Skip a turn." If a loved one steps to one of those spaces, they will not move on their next turn. One piece reads "Vote someone out" on the other side. If a loved one turns over that piece, it gives them the right to choose a loved one to eliminate from the game. Verbal contact between players and loved ones is not allowed; non-verbal contact is. The last loved one standing spends the night at Soliantu beach.; After several moves made by all, Beverly was eliminated first. She gave a goodbye hug to Paschal and headed on her way. The game continued with Daryl finding the "Vote someone out" tile. Undecided on whom to choose, Daryl tossed his cap in the air and it fell by Leander's feet, bringing Vecepia to tears. As he hugged a weepy Vecepia, Leander encouraged her to stay strong before heading out next. As the game progressed, Daryl was next to go followed by Rebecca, both of whom hugged Sean and Neleh respectively before heading out as well. Although Diana and Patrick both ran out of moves, Diana was eliminated due to being the first to run out. Therefore, Patrick won the challenge and, after a big hug from a gleeful Kathy, spent the night with her and the rest of the tribe. Jeff even gave Patrick a buff. Upon returning to camp, Kathy put Patrick to work by having him collect taro root and crush troca shells. After struggling to crack the shells, Patrick realized how hard it was for everybody and even admitted to not being the outdoor type. Having been visited by Beverly, Paschal felt he had come face-to-face with himself and planned to change his outlook on life upon returning home and not take things for granted anymore. Vecepia had similar feelings after being with Leander. Once alone with him, Kathy asked Patrick for advice on how to play the game from this point on, but Patrick had no advice at all. All in all, Patrick's stay at Soliantu turned out not to be enjoyable for him. Kathy was in tears as a motorboat arrived to pick Patrick up and take him back. Upon Patrick's departure, the game was back on. Robert felt vulnerable being the last of John's Rotu alliance. Sean and Vecepia suspected Neleh of riding Paschal's coattails. Kathy thought if she made it to the final three either with Neleh and Paschal or Sean and Vecepia, she would be last to go due to the bonds both pairs have.: Immunity challenge: Each player has an hourglass structure filled with sand. A tiki is placed at the base of each structure. Each player takes turns firing small rocks with a slingshot at another player's structure hoping to break one of nine tiles on it. Breaking a tile releases sand that falls over a player's tiki. Once a player's tiki is completely covered, they are out of the game. Players rotate one space over after each round. The last player left with their tiki uncovered wins.; At the immunity challenge, the three men were the first to have their tikis covered, much to Kathy's delight. But Kathy's celebration was short-lived after being the fourth one down. Neleh and Vecepia continued to battle it out until Vecepia's accuracy paid off for her, winning her individual immunity. Feeling even more vulnerable than before, Robert said he didn't regret anything about his time in the game. Sure enough, at Tribal Council, Robert was unanimously voted out over Sean, making him the fourth member of the jury.
58	13	"A Tale of Two Cities"	Recap	May 16, 2002	19.15	7.5/20
With just under a week left in the game, the harsh conditions continued to wear down the remaining players. Given the strong bond that Sean had with Vecepia and the similar bond between Neleh and Paschal, Kathy found herself being the swing vote at the next Tribal Council. Despite noticing Kathy's predicament and weighing racial differences, Vecepia did not believe that race was not an issue in the game. Upset over such assumption, Paschal bet that Kathy felt foolish for being asked by Vecepia to consider such concept.: Reward challenge: The players compete in an obstacle course consisting of elements from six previous challenges. Players begin by gathering eight pieces of their color tiki. Once completed correctly, they move on to a pile of coconuts and a bamboo shoot. Players must crack coconuts and fill the bamboo shoot to overflowing with coconut juice before moving on to a pair of stilts that hang in the air from a rope that is tied to a log. Players must untie the knots to release the stilts and take them to a ten-foot section where they must walk across while on the stilts. Once across, players advance to another bunch of coconuts. Inside one coconut is a key to unlocking a box containing a slingshot. Players must take their slingshot to the final station where a plate of colored rocks are found and use the slingshot and rocks to break a tile on an hourglass structure which, when broken, will release sand to cover a small tiki at the bottom. The first player to break the tile and cover their tiki with sand wins a new Saturn VUE all-wheel drive S.U.V. with all of the extra features.; Despite being third after Vecepia and Neleh to assemble his tiki at the reward challenge, Sean was first to fill his bamboo shoot and completed the rest of the course with no one else close to him. He even broke the tile on his hourglass structure with his first shot, quickly burying the small tiki at the bottom, and winning himself a new Saturn VUE all-wheel drive S.U.V. with all of the extra features. Soon after returning to camp, despite more hunger and fatigue, everyone went searching for troca shells in the shallow waters near their beach. Sean was thrilled to have found his very first troca. That night, all five sat around the fire to discuss their differences and the division among one another. Paschal revealed his allegiance to Neleh saying that neither would vote against each other and felt that Sean and Vecepia had an alliance and were not being truthful by denying it. Sean and Vecepia felt that Neleh and Paschal assumed that their allegiance was on account of Sean and Vecepia both being African-American. Although the debate continued long into the night, the issue was not resolved. The next morning, Kathy continued to feel the pressure of being the swing vote and took time out by trying to fly the kite that she flew at a previous reward challenge, but was unable to get it airborne.: Immunity challenge: Six stations are spread throughout an area. Each station has a question with two possible answers. The questions are related to a Marquesan story told to the players by Jeff. When a player reaches a station, they must insert their torch in a slot, signifying that the station is occupied and not allowing another player to enter. If a player reaches into the bag below the right answer, they will find a tiki which must be attached to their necklace. Otherwise, they will find a bone which must be taken to a fire wok and dropped in as a sacrifice before continuing on, costing valuable time. The first player to answer five questions correctly and cross the finish line with five tikis wins.; At the immunity challenge, it was a frantic race as the five players raced to answer questions about a Marquesan story which Jeff told them. Although she and Neleh each dropped one tiki on their way to the finish line, Kathy found the tiki she dropped and came out on top, winning individual immunity. The next day, Kathy continued to weigh out her voting options before she and the others hiked to Tribal Council where the debate from the previous night continued where they left off and with far more tension. Although he tried to influence Kathy's vote one last time, Sean was voted out over Neleh, making him the fifth member of the jury.
59	14	"The Sole Survivor"	Recap	May 23, 2002	25.87	10.4/23
After returning to camp from a heated Tribal Council, the final four members of the Soliantu tribe sat around the fire to discuss the outcome of the vote. Having cast the deciding vote, Kathy dwelled on her final decision to vote out Sean not knowing whether or not she did the right thing by doing so. The next day, Paschal struggled with his island routine saying that he was in good mental shape but bad physical shape. After a duet of "Show Me the Way to Go Home," Kathy and Neleh let out a scream hoping to relieve their physical and mental fatigues. Having heard their screams, Vecepia decided that in spite of loving them, she has had enough with her tribemates. That night, the final four players hiked to Tribal Council where their next immunity challenge took place.: Immunity challenge: At Tribal Council, the final four players are each given a pad of paper. Jeff asks them a series of questions relating to the twelve players who had been voted out or the events that happened throughout the course of the game. Once a question is asked, the players must write down their answers and reveal them once all four have finished writing. Each player gets one point per correct answer. Whoever scores ten points first wins.; The first of several questions that they were asked was a two-parter to which Neleh got two points on, while everyone else got one point apiece. Although the lead was tied for most of the game, Vecepia was the first to reach ten points, winning her individual immunity. Shortly before the vote, Kathy negotiated with Vecepia by asking her to keep her immunity but not vote against her in order to force a tie. Vecepia accepted Kathy's offer and cast the deciding vote against Neleh. The vote was tied as Kathy and Neleh received two votes each. Jeff then revealed that in the tie-breaker previous Tribal Council votes did not count nor did questions and answers as opposed to previous seasons. Instead, the players were given two minutes to discuss who should be next to go and come to a unanimous decision as to whether Kathy or Neleh would be voted out. Failure to finalize such decision meant all but Vecepia picking colored rocks (two yellow, one purple) out of a bag. Picking the purple rock meant being the next to go. After the discussion, no decision was made. So Jeff brought the bag around and one at a time, Neleh, Kathy and Paschal reached into the bag and pulled out a rock. When Jeff signaled the three of them to reveal their rocks, Kathy and Neleh each had a yellow rock, leaving Paschal with the purple rock. Therefore, Paschal, despite never receiving one vote at previous Tribal Councils, was the next player eliminated and became the sixth member of the jury. At 3:00AM the next morning, Jeff came to Soliantu and woke up the final three players and let them know of the day ahead of them. Upon conclusion of the description, Jeff gave the final three players a map to where they would later journey to before leaving them to assemble an outrigger canoe. With their canoe completed, Kathy, Neleh and Vecepia paddled to the other side of the island. Shortly after reaching shore, they found a mat with brushes and black body paint with which they painted symbols and personal images on their bodies similar to the tattoos worn by local Marquesan tribesmen. Once painted, they hiked along a high ridge where they encountered the torches of the first thirteen players eliminated from the game and reflected on the time they spent with them. After passing all thirteen torches, the final three players hiked to an area of purification where, after saying a prayer, they bathed to cleanse their spirits using a mixture of oils and spices. As their cleansing ritual commenced, Kathy reflected on herself and the other two remaining players and found it amazing that the three of them had made it to day 38 in spite of their different ways of life. After adorning themselves with flowers, the three remaining players hiked the rest of the way and met Jeff for the final immunity challenge.: Immunity challenge: The final three players stand on two logs and lean forward to have one hand on the immunity idol. If a player lets go of the idol, lifts up one foot or touches the idol or supporting tiki with their free hand, they are out of the game. The last player standing wins.; The challenge went long into sundown. About four and a half hours into the challenge, Neleh suggested that Kathy fixes her top. Doing so with her free hand caused Kathy to lose her balance and fall off her logs, putting her out of the game. After Kathy limped off to the side, Vecepia tried to make a deal with Neleh by asking if she would take her to the final two if she stepped off. Neleh agreed and Vecepia stepped off her logs, giving Neleh individual immunity. When the final three players arrived at Tribal Council, they noticed that Paschal was not among the members of the jury. Jeff explained that Paschal collapsed before Tribal Council was to start and had been evacuated to medical care. Having witnessed the incident and being a registered nurse, John was asked by Jeff to explain what happened. John explained that Paschal fainted on his feet and showed signs of dehydration but was within normal limits, talking, alert and knew where he was. Kathy, Neleh, and Vecepia were relieved when John assured them that Paschal would be fine. The three of them moved on to discuss what happened at the immunity challenge. Kathy admitted her mistake by trying to fix her top and falling from the logs as a result, leading Vecepia to make her deal with Neleh, much to the jury's chagrin when Jeff pointed it out. Neleh explained that she accepted Vecepia's offer because she was convinced that she would be the next to go if she didn't win. Before long, Jeff sent Neleh to cast the one vote to determine who would be the final player to be eliminated from the game. When Jeff tallied Neleh's vote, it was revealed that Kathy was the final player voted out of the game and the seventh and final member of the jury. Neleh and Vecepia thus became the first final two who originally started on two different tribes. Upon returning to camp from Tribal Council, Neleh and Vecepia tended to their fire where they later sat by and prayed for Paschal's health before turning in for the night. Shortly after waking up to their final morning and preparing breakfast, the final two players noticed a pig and two chickens near their camp. The two of them later took their last mud bath in the shallow waters near their beach. When they returned to shore, they started up a bonfire and ceremoniously burned unwanted clothes left behind by their former tribemates. All the while, the two finalists were curious as to how the jury would interpret their methods of gameplay. Vecepia hoped the jury would define her methods as strategic, decisive and partly deceiving, while Neleh hoped that the jury would know that she had been upfront and honest. Both ladies somberly took one last look at the ocean before hiking to their final Tribal Council. Each jury member had different feelings about the events leading to the final day. Paschal felt that the game was played honestly and did not know what caused Neleh and Vecepia to make it so far other than luck. Kathy could not process the game and had not focused on whom to vote for. Zoe thought it was best to have an all-woman's final and that both Neleh and Vecepia were deserving of the million dollars. Despite not feeling so good about Neleh and Vecepia being the final two and that they lasted longer than him, Robert saw his jury vote as a coup for himself. Sean said that the money would not be swayed by his preference for race and thought the best player should win regardless. Unable to feel the jury's power until joining the jury herself, Tammy did not think that Neleh nor Vecepia deserved to win the money and must decide who played best and deceived her the least. John felt that how the final two would react to his statement would determine who gets his vote. When Neleh and Vecepia arrived at their final Tribal Council, they were glad to see Paschal back on his feet and among the rest of the jury. After explaining the procedure, Jeff had both finalists make their opening statements. Neleh stated that she had an incredible time, that everything she did for the other players was out of love, that she gave everything 100% and loves them regardless of their vote. Vecepia stated that she wanted to have a strategy, develop relationships, avoid riding other players' coattails and prove herself with her work ethic, spirituality and gumption to be her best. The jury then approached Neleh and Vecepia with questions and comments. Tammy stated that she was going to lie, cheat and do what she could to win but changed her strategy because she felt bad about her gameplay because of Neleh and Vecepia's "holier-than-Thou" attitude. Tammy considered the two finalists as hypocrites and possibly the biggest liars due to condemning herself along with John, Robert, and Zoe for being manipulative only to be the same way behind their backs through Christianity. Tammy felt that Kathy deserved the million dollars more than Neleh and Vecepia but congratulated them anyway for beating her at her own game. Sean asked the final two if there was a moral message they gained gameplay. Neleh said that at times, she wanted to follow her heart but felt she couldn't due to an alliance she had made and learned to always follow her heart. Vecepia, on the other hand, said that when in a situation, she would think it through before giving her word. Paschal considered both finalists deserving of making it to the end, the epitome of what America has to offer and would have been glad to have had either of them as his daughters. Robert asked the finalists if there was any decision they made or action they took that could be their downfall. Vecepia said that she regreted what she did to Kathy, while Neleh said that she regreted Robert and Zoe leaving when they did. Zoe believed that both Neleh and Vecepia were good-hearted and congratulated them for making it to the end. Kathy asked Neleh which point in the game she did her most dramatic strategic movement, what her decision was and when and the decision she made herself. Neleh explained that she really started playing on day 24 when she along with Kathy, Paschal, Sean and Vecepia started targeting the Rotu alliance of John, Robert, Tammy, and Zoe. Kathy then asked Vecepia how she could go on playing the game by adjusting alliances and not feel part of such cunning manner to which Vecepia explained that her strategy was to wait for people to approach her. After angrily stating how he felt about integrity and stating that both of them lied, John asked why he should vote for either finalist. Neleh stated that she was going to join his alliance with Robert, Tammy, and Zoe hoping that somehow she would finish further than fifth place but chose not to due to finding out that would not happen. Vecepia stated that John knew she came in with a strategy and played the game at her best to get to the end. In conclusion, Vecepia stated that regardless of she and Neleh responded to what the jury had to say, that the jury found the answers to decide justly. Neleh asked the jury to consider how she treated them, her love and compassion and that luck got her to the end. Shortly afterwards, the jury cast their vote for who they felt deserved the million dollars. Once the votes were cast, Jeff retrieved the voting urn but did not tally the votes right away saying that they would be tallied after they returned to the United States. Jeff then left the Tribal Council area, boarded an arriving helicopter and flew away.
60	15	"The Reunion"	N/A	May 30, 2002	17.89	8.0/19
Months later, Jeff arrived in New York City in the same helicopter he left the Tribal Council area in with the voting urn in hand, Jeff hailed a taxicab which took him to Central Park where the two finalists and the seven members of the jury awaited him on a big stage before a live audience of cheering fans. Shortly after building suspense, Jeff tallied the jury's votes. Neleh received the votes of Kathy, Paschal, and Zoe, but in the end, Vecepia received the votes of Sean, Robert, Tammy, and John and was declared the winner of the million dollars and the title of Sole Survivor. The jury confirmed Kathy would have won easily over both Vecepia and Neleh, beating both 6–1, with only Paschal voting Neleh, and only Sean voting Vecepia. The castaways returned to discuss the season, hosted by Rosie O'Donnell. As of today, this is the last reunion special hosted by someone other than Jeff Probst.

== Voting history ==
	Original tribes			Switched tribes			Merged tribe								
Episode	1	2	3	4	5	6	7	8	10	11	12	13	14		
Day	3	6	9	12	15	18	21	24	27	30	33	36	37		38
Tribe	Maraamu	Maraamu	Maraamu	Maraamu	Rotu	Maraamu	Soliantu	Soliantu	Soliantu	Soliantu	Soliantu	Soliantu	Soliantu		Soliantu
Eliminated	Peter	Patricia	Hunter	Sarah	Gabriel	Gina	Rob	John	Zoe	Tammy	Robert	Sean	Tie (Note: The Tribal Council vote resulted in a tie. The castaways must come to a unanimous decision as to whom to eliminate between the tied castaways, or else one of the non-immune castaways would be eliminated by random draw.)	Paschal	Kathy
Votes	5–2–1	4–3	4–2	4–1	7–1	3–1	7–2–1	6–3	7–1	5–2	5–1	3–2	2–2	Rock Draw (Note: Due to a tie and the non-immune contestants being unable to come up with a unanimous decision to vote out either Kathy or Neleh, Kathy, Neleh, and Paschal drew rocks to resolve the vote. Paschal picked the purple rock and was eliminated from the game.)	1–0
Voter	Votes														
Vecepia	Sarah	Patricia	Hunter		Gabriel		Rob	John	Zoe	Tammy	Robert	Neleh	Neleh	Immune	None (Note: Kathy and Vecepia were not eligible to vote as the only eligible players they could vote for were each other.)
Neleh				Sarah		Gina	Rob	John	Zoe	Tammy	Robert	Sean	Kathy	Yellow rock	Kathy
Kathy				Sarah		Gina	Zoe	John	Zoe	Tammy	Robert	Sean	Neleh	Yellow rock	None
Paschal				Sarah		Gina	Rob	John	Zoe	Tammy	Robert	Sean	Kathy	Purple rock	
Sean	Sarah	Patricia	Hunter		Gabriel		John	John	Zoe	Tammy	Robert	Neleh			
Robert					Gabriel		Rob	Sean	Zoe	Vecepia	Sean				
Tammy					Gabriel		Rob	Sean	Zoe	Vecepia					
Zoe					Gabriel		Rob	John	Robert						
John					Gabriel		Rob	Sean							
Rob	Peter	Patricia	Hunter		Gabriel		John								
Gina	Peter	Sarah	Sarah	Sarah		Kathy									
Gabriel					Rob										
Sarah	Peter	Patricia	Hunter	Kathy											
Hunter	Peter	Sarah	Sarah												
Patricia	Peter	Sarah													
Peter	Patricia														

Jury vote
Episode	15	
Day	39	
Finalist	Vecepia	Neleh
Votes	4–3	
Juror	Votes	
Kathy		Yes
Paschal		Yes
Sean	Yes	
Robert	Yes	
Tammy	Yes	
Zoe		Yes
John	Yes	

== Production ==
Promoted as "Survivor's going back to the beach", this installment of the series had originally been planned to be filmed on the Arabian Peninsula in the deserts of Jordan's Wadi Rum. However, less than two months before filming was to begin, as a result of the September 11 attacks and the political situation in the Middle East, this plan was abandoned and production was moved to Nuku Hiva.

== Reception ==
The use of the purple rock tiebreaker has been one of the most polarizing moments in Survivor history, with critics divided on whether or not it was an unfair solution to a tie, or if it made for entertaining television.

Host Jeff Probst was not fond of this season, ranking it his second-to-least favorite (as of season 19). Probst stated, "Dramatically, I just felt like Marquesas never got any momentum, and by the time you got to the final two with Neleh and Vecepia — I'm sleeping." Winner Vecepia Towery was not contacted about appearing on the show's all-winner season, despite being one of only 14 female winners, as well as her status as the show's first African-American winner. He also said that the environment in Marquesas was the most brutally unpleasant in the show's history due to the biting no-no flies.

However, Survivor columnist Dalton Ross of Entertainment Weekly gave this season a positive review, ranking it 17th out of 40 and calling it, "an underrated season that saw the first totem pole shake-up: where people on the bottom got together to overthrow those on the top. Yes, it was a weak final two, but it also had a woman peeing on a guy's hand. Plus: Purple rock!!!"

The exit of John Carroll is widely considered to be the foundation of modern Survivor strategy by columnists and fans alike. Joe Reid of The Wire ranked it among the bottom 10, at #19, in 2014, saying that Rob had "a comparatively ignominious debut" despite his future reputation, called John "a preening dyngus," and said that "Vecepia backing into a victory because she didn't piss anyone off was anti-climactic." "The Purple Rock Podcast" ranked Marquesas 27th out of 40, saying that although the season "gets bonus points" for featuring the purple rock, the season "sort of limps to the finish line" in its storytelling and character narratives. In 2015, a poll by Rob Has a Podcast ranked Marquesas 18th out of 30 with Rob Cesternino ranking this season 21st. This was updated in 2021 during Cesternino's podcast, Survivor All-Time Top 40 Rankings, ranking 22nd out of 40. In 2020, Inside Survivor ranked this season 9th out of 40 saying that it "is a season that deserves more respect. Not only does it have some incredible characters and hilarious moments, but it's an important, game-changing season." In 2024, Nick Caruso of TVLine ranked this season 14th out of 47.

A small increase in the average number of viewers was observed for the season compared to the prior season, Survivor: Africa.

== Controversy ==
=== Purple rock tie-breaker ===
Paschal's elimination at the final four sparked controversy in the game of Survivor. Starting in Marquesas, if the tribe could not reach a unanimous decision as to who should be voted off within an allotted time, contestants who did not have immunity would pull different colored rocks from a sack. Whoever chose the odd-colored rock (in this case, purple) would be eliminated. The contestants receiving the most votes (in this situation, Kathy and Neleh) also become immune. However, at this Tribal Council, Neleh and Kathy were also forced to choose rocks where they should have been immune, which in theory would have eliminated Paschal by default. Though Paschal chose the purple rock and was eliminated anyway, it is speculated that the fire-making challenge (which would involve only Neleh and Kathy) should have been used in this case and that production was in error by using the rock drawing tiebreaker as there were four contestants remaining. This theory was supported by host Jeff Probst, when he later admitted that using the purple rock tiebreaker was a mistake at this point in the game, because the formula behind it was impossible to apply fairly with only four players left.

Following Marquesas, the drawing of rocks to break a tie would not occur again for more than eleven years, when in the twenty-seventh season, Survivor: Blood vs. Water, Katie Collins drew the odd-colored rock at the final six tribal council and went to Redemption Island (as the twist was in play). The odd-colored rock in this draw was white while the others were black. The rock draw also appeared in the thirty-third season, Survivor: Millennials vs. Gen X. A tied vote at the final ten resulted in Jessica Lewis being eliminated after drawing the sole black rock (with the other rocks being white). Probst stated in an interview during Blood vs. Water that the tiebreaker has been used so scarcely that they did not take the consistency of the colors into account.
