= Paschal English =

American US Air Force Colonel and judge

Paschal Anderson English, Jr. (born March 5, 1944) is a retired United States Air Force Colonel, a former judge, and a contestant on the fourth season of Survivor, Survivor: Marquesas.

English served in the Air Force during the Vietnam War and later transferred to the National Guard, where he continued to serve until 1998. While still a member of the Air Force National Guard, he obtained a judgeship in the greater Atlanta area. English served there until 2010.

English appeared on Survivor in early 2002 while still a judge, and outlasted 12 other contestants to earn his place at the penultimate Tribal Council. He was unwilling to betray his ally, forcing the first-ever elimination by random rock draw. English drew the unlucky purple rock, and therefore was eliminated without ever having a vote cast against him.

== Early life ==
Born in Birmingham, Alabama, Paschal was raised in the greater Atlanta area, where he has lived the rest of his life. He attended law school at the nearby University of Georgia. He married his wife, Beverly, and the pair had two daughters, Ashley and Rachel(Miss Georgia (U.S. state) 1995).

== Military and judicial career ==
During the Vietnam War, at the age of 24, English joined the Air Force. He was deployed to Asia, however, from 1971-72. He left the Air Force as a Captain, transferring out to the Georgia Air National Guard. In 1975, he began working as a Chief Assistant District Attorney. Twelve years later, he became a Superior Court Judge.

In May 2010, English chose to resign his position after it was revealed that he failed to take action when a fellow judge, Johnnie Caldwell, was sexually harassing an attorney in the court.

The revelation of mishandling the sexual harassment case led to the public revelation of a 2008 incident where English was caught in a sexual act in a parked car with a public defender who had appeared in over 200 cases in his court. The incident was captured on the dash camera of a police car and confirmed by District Attorney Scott Ballard.

In 2013, after English retired, the Georgia Court of Appeals ordered that several of his cases required new trials because the original trials were potentially compromised by his inappropriate relationship with the defense attorney. Cases that were retried were significant criminal cases that included charges of armed robbery, aggravated assault, and aggravated child molestation.

== Survivor ==
=== Marquesas ===
While on Survivor, English formed a tight bond with Neleh Dennis, a young woman from Utah that English considered like a daughter. The two of them were involved in the crucial turning point of the season, when the dominant alliance of four was toppled by the three outsiders and the English-Dennis pair, who would not have been otherwise expected to bond together. This moment has been considered pivotal in the development of Survivor strategy, and English and Dennis were at the heart of it. English continued on, winning multiple challenges and seeing through the systematic elimination of the four rivals of his makeshift alliance. During this time, he met his wife, Beverly, during a brief visit from loved ones. The two of them shared a highly emotional embrace that was later celebrated during the reunion show.

After dismantling the entire rival alliance, there were five contestants remaining. English and Dennis were able to sway the swing vote, Kathy Vavrick-O'Brien, and earn their way to the final four. But when the other remaining contestant, Vecepia Towery, promptly won immunity to ensure her passage to the final three, Towery and Vavrik-O'Brien made a deal. The two of them voted to eliminate Dennis, while Dennis and English voted to eliminate Vavrik-O'Brien. The contestants expressed uncertainty about how such a tie would be resolved. New rules were then revealed to settle the tie; if English and Towery were unable to decide between themselves which of the two other contestants to eliminate, then everyone (except for Towery, who was immune) would be subjected to a random rock draw, where two contestants would survive and one would be eliminated.

Towery had no reason to avoid a rock draw, as she would be immune in either case. English could have avoided it by betraying his ally, but was not willing to give her up. When he, Dennis, and Vavrick-O'Brien drew rocks, English was the one to draw the unlucky rock and be the 13th person eliminated from the game in fourth place.

He was then evacuated prior to the next Tribal Council, which he otherwise would have attended as a member of the jury. English was treated and returned in time to witness the final showdown between Dennis and Towery. He cast a vote for Dennis, but she lost, 4-3.

English went the entire season without having a single vote cast against him. He was given a new car at the conclusion of the reunion show, along with all his fellow contestants.
