= Sarah Jones (author) =

British author and speaker

Sarah Jones is a British author and speaker. She has spoken about mental health in the UK and the importance of identifying problems. She has also spoken about the body language of various people during events in the Daily Express, BBC and others. Jones' only book to date is From Vulnerable to Invincible.

== Career ==
She has highlighted a number of mental health problems that aren't always publicly discussed, such as cherophobia. Jones spoke about the condition in the Metro.

In March 2018, she released the book, From Vulnerable to Invincible.

Jones has received media coverage for analysing how celebrities and politicians have reacted in particular situations. One such example was featured in The Daily Express when Jones studied the body language of British Prime Minister, Theresa May, during an EU Summit discussing Brexit. Her speech outside Downing Street was analysed by Jones, who stated "her hands emphasise her points and make her appear very authoritative."

Jones also entered into a wider debate about the relationship between Jean Claude Juncker and the Prime Minister. In this analysis she stated that both he and May were positive when discussing issues and both had a professional manner and showed respect for each other whenever in public. She suggested the numerous signs from how they act shows they likely have constructive conversations away from the cameras.
