= Shahbagi =

Derogatory term for leftists in Bangladesh

Shahabagi (Bengali: শাহবাগী) is a derogatory or pejorative political label used in Bangladesh to describe individuals associated with left-leaning activism. The term originated during the 2013 Shahbag protests, where secular and leftist demonstrators gathered at Shahbag in Dhaka demanding capital punishment for convicted war criminal and Bangladesh Jamaat-e-Islami leader Abdul Quader Mollah.

== Origin ==
The term Shahbagi is based on 2013 protest at Shahbagh which began at the call of the Bloggers and Online Activists Network, demanding the execution of Jamaat leaders and war criminal Abdul Quader Mollah. Later it was known as the Ganajagaran Mancha led by various secularist and left wing organizations. Opponents of the Shahbagh movement, Hefazat-e-Islam, often portrayed the movement as one led by "atheists." They widely circulated selected writings of certain bloggers to support this narrative, which many believe significantly contributed to the controversy surrounding the Shahbagh movement. Former prime minister of Bangladesh Khaleda Zia also referred the protests of atheists.

== Usage ==
On December 29, 2013, Khaleda Zia, shared a photo of a victim beaten in Shahbag protest on Facebook and wrote:

The day this victim's son or brother catches and makes Shahbagi or Bakshali bleed, no one will have the power to stop them. Even those pests who, under the guise of being women leaders or human rights activists, continue to lick the boots of atheistic elements and Indian agents, will be held to account.

Following the July Revolution, an anti-Shahbagi platform staged a symbolic protest in which a cow was named "Shahbagi" and bathed under a banner reading "গোসল কর শাহবাগী" (lit. 'Take bath, Shahbagi').

In December 2024, the editor of New Age, Nurul Kabir making remarks on Salimullah Khan referred him as Shahbagi.

Mamunul Haque, secretary general of Hefazat-e-Islam Bangladesh referred to the group as atheists "created by the Awami League" to erase "Islamic values". Same year, on 16 December, Ameer of Jamaat-e-Islami Bangladesh, Shafiqur Rahman urged "Shahbagis" should also be brought under justice stating "those who were killed, murdered on the demand of the "Shahbagis"—they too will be brought back to justice." In January 2025, at an exhibition in Dhaka, Islami Chhatra Shibir used the slogan "Take bath Shahbagi". At a conference at Jahangirnagar University, Shibir Central President Jahidul Islam claimed the slogan symbolized cleansing the nation's politics from fascist elements. Later in a Facebook status he alleged Shahbagis as 'agents of fascism' and 'responsible for establishing fascism and Islamophobia in Bangladesh through ideological hegemony'. On 18 January, protest was led by Dhaka College students against leftist student organisation Bangladesh Students' Union (BSU) carrying anti-Shahbagi slogans.

In March 2025, left-wing protestors allegedly attacked police. Following the incident Shadik Kayem, coordinator of the Students Against Discrimination (SAD), and Hasnat Abdullah, the Chief Organizer of Southern region for the National Citizen Party, expressed criticism of left-wing protesters while referring to them "Shahbagi". BNP politician Ishraque Hossain criticized Gonojagoron Mancha calling it "Shahbagi". Students at Comilla University, Jahangirnagar University, Dhaka University held protests featuring anti-fascist and anti-Shahbagi slogans. Demonstrators also called for the arrest of activist Lucky Aktar, labeling her Shahbagi for her role during the 2013 protest.

In April 2025, Umama Fatema leader of leftist student organisation Bangladesh Students' Union, supported the controversial report of Women's Affairs Reform Commission, netizens opposing the commission labelled her "Shahbagi" which she later addressed in a Facebook post.

On May 2025, in an interview, Inquilab Mancha spokesperson Sharif Osman Hadi alleged that Shahbagis had played a role in disrupting law and order in Bangladesh.

On 27 May 2025, protest was carried out at Rajshahi University with various anti-Shahbagi slogans. Hefazat-e-Islam Bangladesh issued a statement demanding trials for Shapla Square Massacre alleging role of Shahbagis.

Shadik Kayem, central publication secretary of Islami Chhatra Shibir, accused the Shahbag protesters of legitimizing a fascist regime through the rise of mob culture, extra-judicial killings and enforced disappearances. S. M. Farhad, president of the Dhaka University unit of Islami Chhatra Shibir, stated that all massacres from the Liberation War to Shahbag must be properly adjudicated, and that any process marred by scandals, abductions, mob violence or undue influence would constitute a "judicial killing."

== See also ==
- 2013 Shahbag protests
- Liberalism in Bangladesh
- Woke
