= Sarah Jones (American journalist) =

American journalist (born 1985)

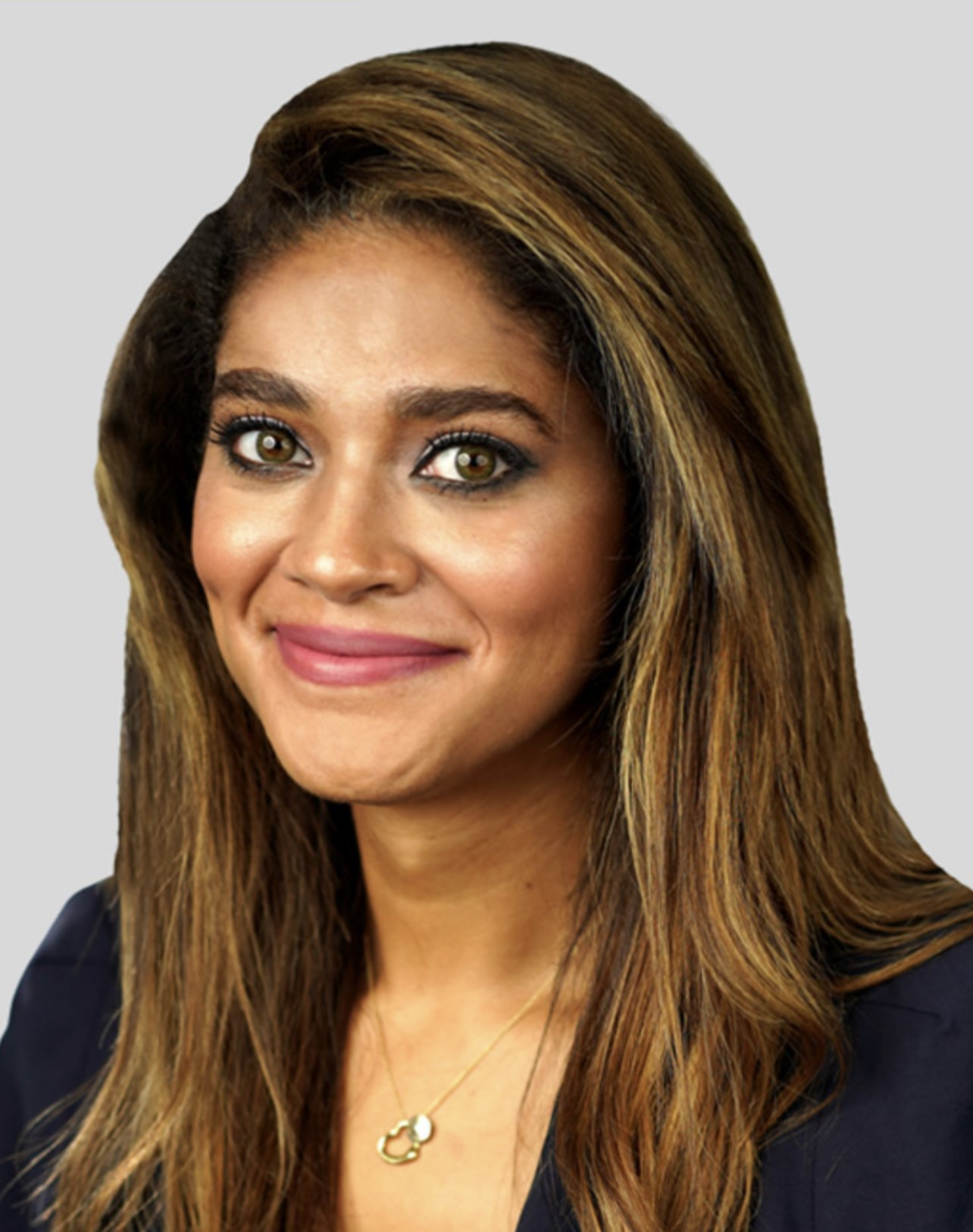
- Born: March 1985 (age 41)
- Education: City, University of London, England (MA), Lake Forest College, Illinois (BA)
- Occupations: Journalist; Author
- Website: www.sarahjonesreports.com

Sarah Jones (born March 1985) is an American Emmy Award winning journalist and founder of Sarah Jones Reports. She hosts a weekly podcast show, Sarah Jones Breaks It Down. In addition, she is the author of Cancer Awareness Magazine for Kids: Leukemia and A Kids Book About War.

== Early life ==
Jones, born in March 1985, attended Hathaway Brown School outside of Cleveland, Ohio. At the age of 13, while still in school, she wrote a publication on cancer awareness. Her work was published as a book in 1999 by the American Cancer Society and distributed by Cleveland Clinic. After completing her primary education, Jones enrolled at Laurel High School. Subsequently, she obtained a bachelor of arts degree in communications from Lake Forest College in Illinois. In 2009, Jones further pursued her education and achieved a master of arts degree in international broadcast journalism with merit from City University of London in England.

== Career ==
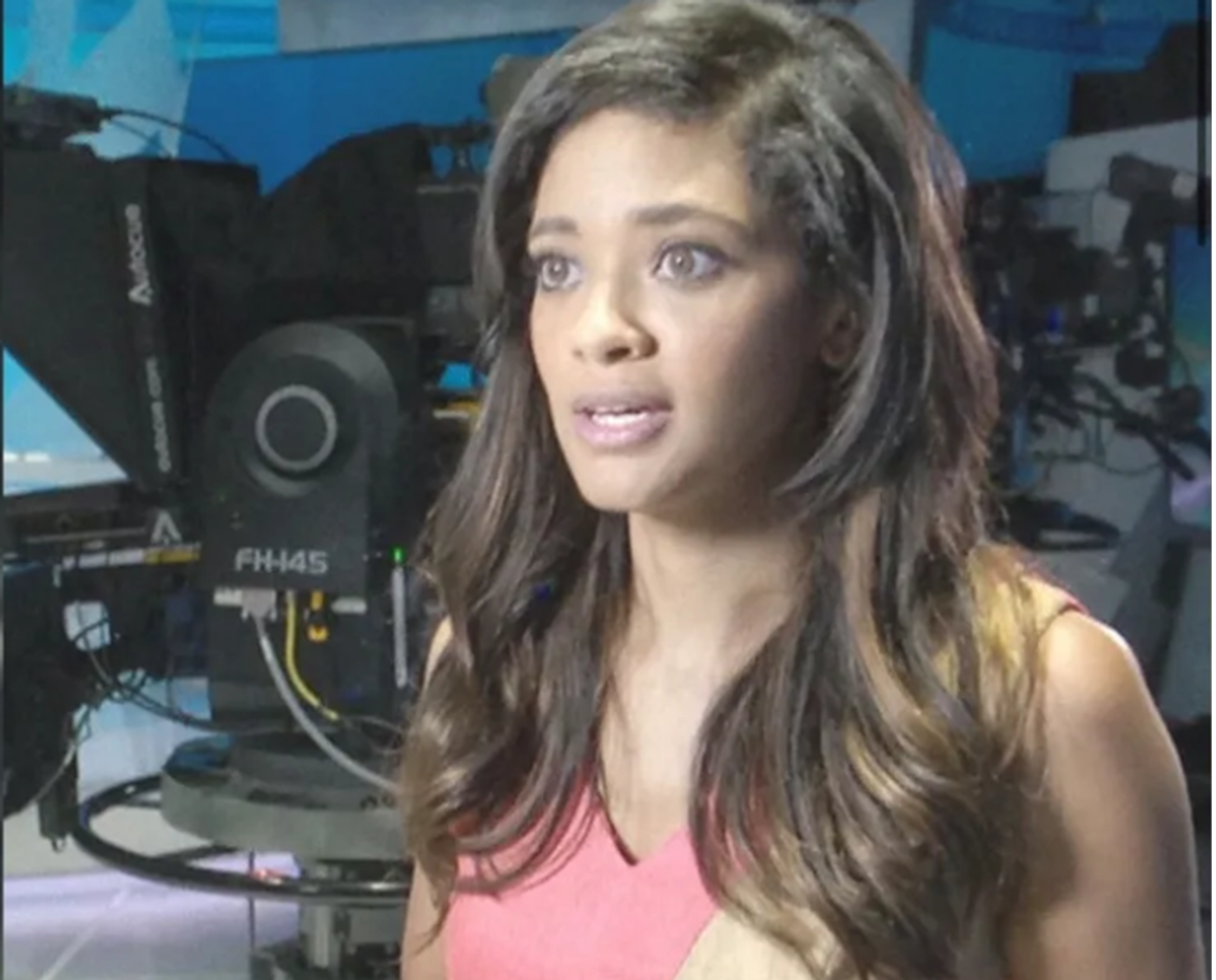
Jones reporting from New York City, 2014

Jones served as a volunteer or freelance journalist for several News companies, including TVE, Ushahidi, CNN, and ABC News. Jones introduced the international moment of silence for the Remembering Fallen Journalist initiative in 2014, in partnership with the UN Foundation's Plus Social Good, Committee to Protect Journalists, The Frontline Club, The National Press Club, Muck Rack, International Association of Press Clubs, James W. Foley Legacy Foundation, Knight Foundation, and Reddit. Jones is the founder of "Seen and Heard" program to highlight underreported news in mainstream media. Jones was associated with several freelance projects, which include the documentary "9/11: The Day that Changed the World" for Brook Lapping Productions. She also participated as a speaker at the International Women and Justice Summit and delivered a presentation on the hypersexualization of women and girls on social media in the same year to presidents and ministers and leaders from more than 30 countries.

In 2013, Jones became a deputy news editor at Al Jazeera America. She later joined TRT World as a senior reporter and associated with the company until 2017. In the following year, Jones started working as a news reporter for KWQC-TV in Davenport, Iowa, and then she joined WTHR in Indianapolis as a reporter in 2019. She was also nominated and completed FBI Citizens Academy in Indianapolis, Indiana, in the same year. In 2022, she published a children's book, A Kids Book About War.

Since 2010, Jones has been serving as an independent journalist under Sarah Jones Reports. She has been hosting a weekly children's podcast show, "Sarah Jones Breaks It Down," and serving as the director of public affairs at The Olayan Group since 2022. Jones is a member of the National Press Club, the Chartered Institute for Journalists, and Chatham House.

In 2016, Jones was invited by US Central Command (CENTCOM) to speak on the impact of social media on war among senior military leaders from the US and allied countries from across five nations participating in multinational exercise as they trained and exchanged best practices about counterterrorism, border security and peacekeeping operations. In 2021, Jones was invited by the Army War College's National Security Seminar to participate in examining current national security issues with military leaders and Army War College Students. Jones has written and contributed to over 1,000 articles covering local, national, and international news at major news outlets.
